= Excelsior (smack) =

Fishing boat built in 1921

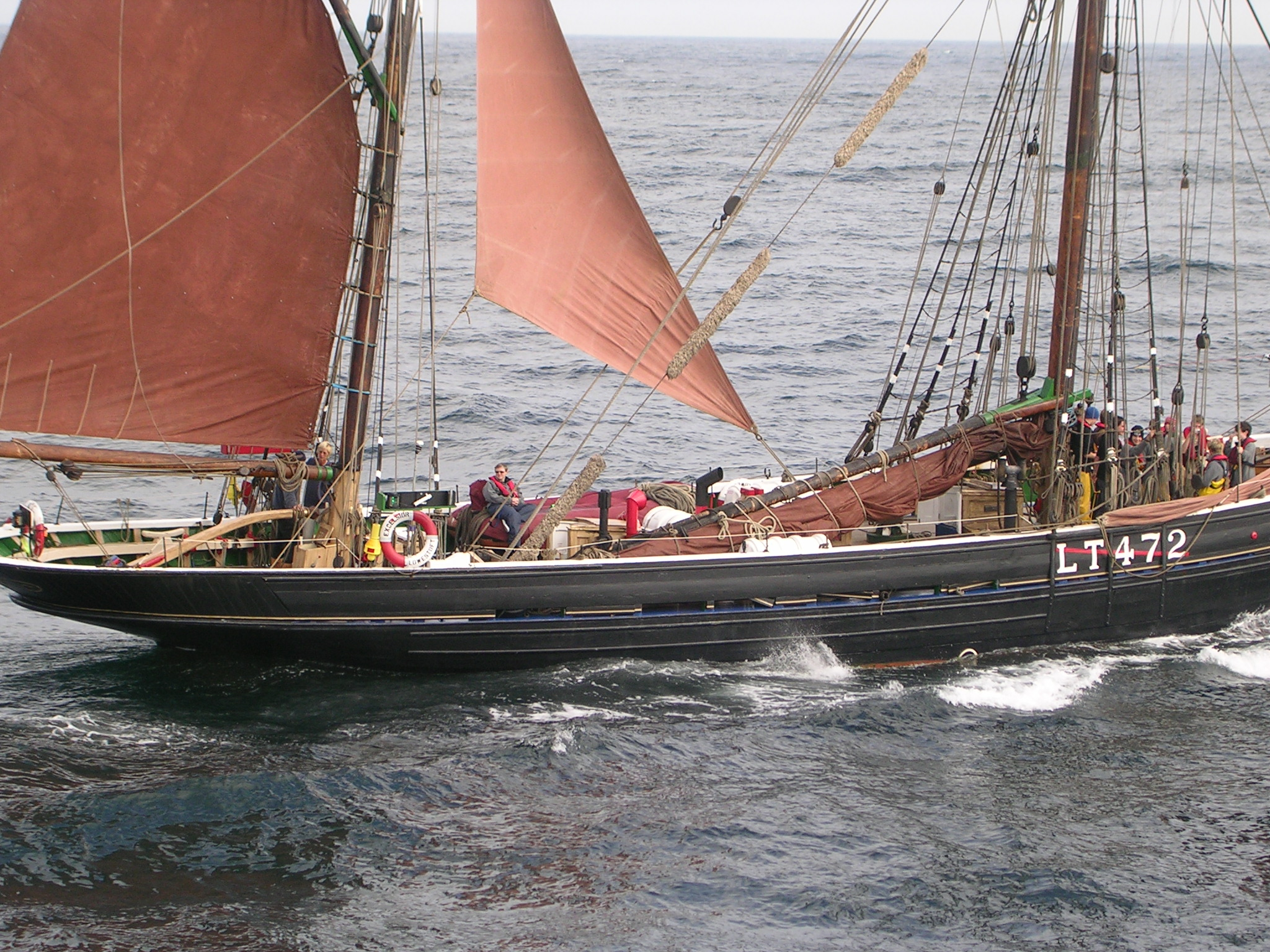
- Excelsior, Lowestoft Fishing Smack

History

United Kingdom
- Name: Excelsior
- Port of registry: Lowestoft
- Builder: John Chambers, Lowestoft
- Launched: 1921
- Completed: 1921
- In service: 1921–1936 (as fishing smack)
- Fate: sold for conversion to coaster
- Name: Svinor
- Port of registry: Lowestoft
- Acquired: 1935
- Out of service: 1971
- Name: Excelsior
- Owner: The Excelsior Trust
- Port of registry: Lowestoft
- Acquired: 1983 by Excelsior Trust)
- In service: 1989–present
- Identification: MMSI number: 232004296; Callsign: MKPJ2; LT472
- Status: In service

General characteristics
- Class & type: Fishing smack
- Tonnage: 55.36 gross register
- Length: 23.5 m (77 ft 1 in)
- Beam: 5.9 m (19 ft 4 in)
- Draught: 3 m (9 ft 10 in)
- Depth: 2.68 m (8 ft 10 in)
- Installed power: Diesel
- Propulsion: Sail
- Capacity: 17
- Crew: 5
- Notes: Currently used in sail training

Excelsior is an authentically restored fishing smack of the Lowestoft fishing fleet and a member of the National Historic Fleet. She was built by John Chambers of Lowestoft in 1921 and worked until 1936 before being converted into a motor coaster.

During her time as a motor coaster she was known as Svinør and worked mainly in Norwegian waters before returning to Lowestoft in 1972.

She measures 23 metres (75 ft) long with a beam of 5.9 metres (19 ft) and is ketch rigged and is the last traditional sailing trawler able to tow a full-sized traditional trawl net. Excelsior was restored in 1989 and operates as a sail training vessel based out of Lowestoft, able to accommodate up to 17 people, including 12 trainees or passengers.

== Background ==
In 1856 a fish market was opened in the relatively newly constructed harbour at Lowestoft. Vessels had been beach launched from Lowestoft but a dispute between merchants in Norwich and the Commissioners of the Haven and Piers at Great Yarmouth who levied duties on the transhipment of goods taken from Norwich and loaded onto sea-going vessels at Yarmouth. To bypass this a harbour at Lowestoft was funded with a route from the Yare to Lowestoft in the 1830s. A rail connection was provided into the market by Samuel Morton Peto in 1947 so that express fish trains could be run direct to inland centres of population though the main markets for herring landed at Lowestoft was Germany and Russia. Various smack owners decided to base their vessels in Lowestoft to take advantage of high prices being paid for fresh fish. Vessels came from various ports around the country, especially Brixham in the south west where conditions may not have been so favourable.

The vessels of each fishing station had characteristics to suit the local conditions. e.g. placing of fishing gear on one side rather than the other to suite the local trawling grounds and the prevailing wind, or the nature and method of stowing the ship's boat to suit the method of landing the catch.

Lowestoft's first fleet was therefore a disparate mixture of craft that were large enough to reach the plentiful trawling grounds of the southern North Sea and withstand the conditions that could be met a day's sail from any shelter.

As new vessels were ordered, a standard local design settled out remarkably quickly. Lowestoft initially had no local smack builders so owners went to established yards around the country until yards had set up in Lowestoft. The local yards could never meet the local demand and a significant part of the fleet was always made up of smacks built elsewhere.

Wherever a smack was built, the specification was always that for Lowestoft use and not the locality where it was built..

The main characteristics of a Lowestoft smack were:

- A hull size to suit single-boat fishing for as long as it took to reach the local grounds, trawl every tide, and return before the ice used to preserve the catch melted i.e. up to four or five days.
- A hull form that did not have to take the ground every tide, as the berthing in Lowestoft was alongside.
- A deep draught, straight keel, and high deadrise for good seakeeping during the winter when fishing was at its best.
- Full bows to suit the short steep seas of the North Sea, as opposed to the narrow bows of vessels fishing the long Atlantic swells of St George's Channel. Such vessels were too wet forward in North Sea conditions.
- Port-handed i.e. arranged for shooting the gear to port.
- With a 14' boat, as opposed to a 16'-18' one used by the 'fleeters' to 'trunk' or transfer the daily catch at sea to a fast cutter, to take the fleet's catch to a distant market.
- Without a gate in the rail for the boat (as at Brixham) because a boat was not needed to land the catch at Lowestoft.
- The most powerful and manageable rig for the size of the crew, and for being able to trawl against the tide whichever way the wind was blowing. This was the cutter rig.

In the 1870s a significant development occurred. This was the provision of a steam capstan to haul the trawl thus saving the need for capstan hands. However, the reduced crew of five could not handle the great mainsail of the cutter rig, so the rig was changed to ketch to break down the sails into more manageable sizes.

The characteristics of the Lowestoft smack remained until the last was built in about 1923 when the sail fleet was being displaced by steam powered vessels. As one of the last smacks built in Lowestoft, Excelsior had the benefit of their empirical development over the preceding half-century and she is absolutely representative of the local design.

Lowestoft was the largest sailing trawling fishing station in the 20th century with a maximum of 340 First Class (over 25 NRT) smacks in 1913. Ramsgate followed with around 220 smacks, and then Brixham with about 160. All large smacks were reputed to have left the Humber by 1900. (Note: By comparison in 1913 the fishing fleet that followed the herring along the east coast meant about 1,800 steam drifters working from Lowestoft and Great Yarmouth combined. While majority were Scottish about 360 were based in Lowestoft.)

The Ramsgate fleet ceased fishing in the late 1920s, the Brixham boats in the mid-1930s, but a small fleet of Lowestoft smacks were still fishing at the beginning of the Second World War when the Admiralty ordered that they be laid up as the Navy could not provide protection. Excelsior's first skipper was Jimmy Strong, who fought U-Boats during the First World War in an armed smack. Fishing boat losses to U-Boats were becoming so great at Lowestoft that smacksmen clamoured for self-defence. Some smacks were therefore fitted with a 3-pounder gun which was the largest gun that the structure of a smack could withstand. A typical action was that which took place on 15 August 1917 between HMAT Nelson (ex G.& E. LT649) and SM UC-63 (a newly commissioned UC61-class coastal minelaying U-Boat). Nelson's fisherman skipper, Tom Crisp, went down with his smack fighting till the end, for which he was posthumously awarded the Victoria Cross.

== History ==
Excelsior was built in 1921 by John Chambers & Co, who were the port's leading smack builders. She was designed by Ernest Chambers drawing upon the firm's accumulated experience, and she and her sisters represent an apogee of Lowestoft smack design. They were highly regarded, and all the sisters survived their working lives whatever the North Sea threw at them.

Construction was carried out on speculation as a 'hospital job' for apprentice boys following the First World War. Good timber was in short supply following the Admiralty's extensive programme of wooden steam drifter construction – John Chambers & Co being selected as the lead contractor. This resulted in some sapwood being used in her construction and all her knees being 'short grained'. Inferior timber was subsequently replaced in an extensive rebuild.

After fishing for fourteen years she was sold to Norway and converted to a motor coaster. The alterations undertaken were minimal as her hull was so new. The centreline deck structures were removed, a couple of cargo hatches and a cabin cut into the deck, and a housing erected over an engine with a wheelhouse on top. The hull and bulwarks were left unaltered, although below decks the hull was completely stripped and new bulkheads erected to create a crew cuddy, hold, and engine room. Loaded to her marks she could manage 100 tons deadweight.

In the Second World War Excelsior's Norwegian owner, Bjorn Stensland, did what he could for his country in the circumstances, which turned out to be a great help to the people of Bodo in North Norway. When Germany invaded in 1940 Excelsior was delivering a cargo of firewood. Having unloaded, the town was bombed and as the houses were largely built of wood, there was a conflagration so Excelsior was able to ferry the townsfolk to safety on nearby islands until she herself was dive-bombed while alongside a jetty. The bomb missed, but the jetty was destroyed. Shaken and leaking she escaped from the town and was beached for repairs.

== Restoration ==
When John Wylson was looking for a sea-going sailing hull with headroom below decks that could be restored back to sailing condition there were many such conversions of former British sailing trawlers in Norway and Sweden at that time (1971). In Britain he had failed to find any former commercial sailing vessel large enough, still afloat, and available, other than Thames barges. He was particularly attracted to the former Excelsior (LT472) which was still largely in original condition and coming up for sale. Another factor was that none of the very numerous fleet of Lowestoft Smacks existed in sailing condition in the UK at that time. The Leader (ex LT474) had been converted into a sail training vessel at Gothenburg, and Keywardin (ex LT1192) was in Greece, but Bermudan-rigged with aluminium spars. In fact, none of the large British sailing trawlers had been restored – those that were sailing having been converted into yachts with deckhouses and light-weight gear.

By that stage in her life Excelsior, then called Svinør of Mandal, had extensive rot in her topsides and bulwarks, and needed rebuilding. However, unlike other vessels, her original bulwarks had survived and were therefore a pattern for accurate replacement. Mortices for carlings in the original deck beams and other evidence revealed the location of all the original centre-line structures. A decision was therefore made to purchase and repatriate her to Lowestoft where all the facilities existed for the restoration of a local smack along with the necessary skills.

John Wylson and a new partner, Mark Trevitt of Beccles, set about the necessary reconstruction, removing virtually all trace of her life as a motor coaster in the process. The only parts remaining from her Norwegian service are the engine beds and stern tube.

Inadvertently the decision had been taken not to preserve the bastardised remains of a Lowestoft smack in order to retain the entire history of the vessel through its fabric. This was fortunate as such vessels are of limited academic, and no public interest, besides which, many more extensively converted ex-British smacks and luggers existed in Norway and Sweden, one of which, the Fremad II (the former Lowestoft lugger, or sailing drifter, Boy Jack LT199) has now become a museum ship to this numerous class of vessel.

Extensive research was undertaken into contemporary models and photographs, and by interviewing surviving shipwrights, smacksmen, and crew members, so that Excelsior could be reconstructed back to as-built condition. This was only possible because Lowestoft was the last fishing station to operate large smacks, and a significant body of knowledge still survived into the 1970s and 80s.

The area below decks, where all evidence of the original had gone, was used to facilitate a new revenue-earning future for Excelsior, by providing accommodation. Modern safety requirements, like an engine and navigational equipment was also incorporated.

The present fabric is therefore a combination of the original; exact replacement of the original; recreation of the original under the direction of the original builders and users; and new material needed to generate an income and ensure compliance with modern safety requirements. Most of the new material is below decks, and anything required above is removable, such as an extra skylight in place of the fish hatch, and a hoodway in place of the warproom hatch, but the hatch boards can be reinstated. In fact, all modern additions on deck can be removed in a couple of days, which is done from time to time and to varying degrees for film work or trawling contracts.

This approach was necessary because it was abundantly clear by the 1970s that the income generated as a museum ship would barely pay the cost of collecting the money, let alone for any maintenance. Furthermore, wooden hulls that no longer go to sea rot quickly if exposed to fresh water (i.e. rainwater). (Note: This was the reason that Nelsonian docks were roofed over and why ships 'in ordinary' are also 'roofed over' such as the preserved HMS Unicorn)

A new revenue-earning and seagoing use was therefore considered essential for the survival of the vessel's fabric, and for the perpetuation of the skills and knowledge associated with her.

== Representative of type ==
Excelsior fished out of Lowestoft for 12 years (1921–1933), she traded around Norway as a motor coaster for 34 years (1937–1971); she has been laid up or undergoing rebuilds for 19 years (1933–1936 and 1972–1988); and has been operating as an historical sail training vessel for 41 years at the time of writing (2020). So, for the greater part of her working life she has been a Lowestoft smack, and for the greatest part of that existence she has been successfully and safely operated as an authentic historical vessel demonstrating her type and being on display to the public wherever she goes. This has included taking part in great maritime events such as the Tall Ships Races, and visits to places as far apart Bergen, Porto, and Saint Petersburg. During this period, she has clocked up 130,000 miles and been seen by millions of people while taking 10,000 people to sea to experience what it is like to sail a Lowestoft Smack. In 2016, she was appointed a Regional Flagship of the year by National Historic Ships.

== In media ==
In modern times Excelsior has been used by television and film makers in productions such Channel 4's The Real History Show: Fish and Ships, and the BBC's The Last Journey of John Keats where Andrew Motion, the poet laureate and Keats biographer who re-enacted Keats' last journey to warmer climes to delay the full onset of tuberculosis.

Excelsior has been an extra in films including Disney's Alice Through the Looking Glass and Christopher Nolan's Dunkirk; and in productions specifically featuring her, such as ITV's Anglia Afloat, BBC's Coast, and Channel 4's Homes by the Sea.

== See also ==
- Mincarlo – last surviving Lowestoft Sidewinder fishing trawler
