= Leonard Andrew Boyd Donaldson =

Royal Navy Admiral (1875–1956)

Admiral Leonard Andrew Boyd Donaldson CB CMG
- Born: 1 August 1875
- Died: 28 June 1956 (aged 80)
- Occupation: British Royal Navy admiral

Admiral Leonard Andrew Boyd Donaldson, CB, CMG (1 August 1875 – 28 June 1956) was a Royal Navy officer who served as Director of Torpedoes and Mining from 1922 to 1924, and as Admiral-Superintendent of Portsmouth dockyard from 1927 to 1931.

== Biography ==
Donaldson was born in 1875, and joined the Royal Navy. He was a lieutenant when in July 1902 he was posted as junior staff to HMS Vernon, the naval torpedo school ship at Chatham dockyard.

During World War I he served in various commands in charge of submarine flotillas. Following the war, he was Director of Torpedoes and Mining at the Admiralty from 1922 to 1924.

In July 1924 he was appointed Captain-Superintendent of Pembroke Dockyard, serving until its closure in May 1926. The following year he was appointed Admiral-superintendent of Portsmouth dockyard, serving as such for four years.

He was promoted to admiral on the Retired list on 8 May 1935.

Military offices
Preceded by Captain Albert Addison	Director of Torpedoes and Mining; 1922–24	Succeeded by Captain Brien Michael Money
Preceded by Captain Arthur Brandreth Scott Dutton	Captain-Superintendent of Pembroke Royal Dockyard; 1924–26	Position abolished
Preceded by Vice-Admiral Bertram Thesiger	Admiral-Superintendent of Portsmouth Dockyard; 1927–31	Succeeded by Vice-Admiral Henry Kitson
