= Percy Addison =

Royal Navy Admiral (1875–1952)

Admiral Sir Percy Addison KBE CB CMG
- Admiral Addison in November 1927.
- Born: 8 November 1875; Southsea, Portsmouth, England
- Died: 13 November 1952 (aged 77); New Forest, Hampshire, England
- Military career
- Allegiance: United Kingdom
- Branch: Royal Navy
- Service years: 1889–1929; 1939–1946
- Rank: Admiral
- Commands: Destroyer Flotilla, Mediterranean Squadron (1924–26); HM Australian Fleet (1922–24); 9th Submarine Flotilla (1917–19); HMS Maidstone (1917–19); HMS E52 (1917); HMS Dartmouth (1915–17); HMS Bonaventure (1909–10); HMS Hazard (1906–07)
- Conflicts: First World War; Second World War
- Awards: Knight Commander of the Order of the British Empire; Companion of the Order of the Bath; Companion of the Order of St Michael and St George; Mentioned in Despatches; Chevalier of the Order of the Légion d'honneur (France); Croix de guerre (France); Military Order of Savoy (Italy); Order of the Rising Sun (Japan)

Admiral Sir Albert Percy Addison, KBE, CB, CMG (8 November 1875 – 13 November 1952) was a senior officer in the Royal Navy. He was the Rear Admiral Commanding His Majesty's Australian Fleet from 30 April 1922 to 30 April 1924. During the First World War he was recognised by the British Admiralty as an authority on submarines, and his knowledge of that class of ship was used extensively.

== Naval career ==
Joining the Royal Navy on 15 July 1889 as a naval cadet, he was promoted to sub-lieutenant on 14 March 1895, and lieutenant on 22 June 1897. He received specialised training in torpedoes, and was posted as a lieutenant (T) to the battleship HMS Victorious on 15 January 1901, as she served on the Mediterranean Station. After service on HMS Mercury, he was later promoted to commander on 31 December 1907 and later to captain on 30 June 1913.

He was appointed Companion of the Order of St Michael and St George (CMG) in 1917 while commanding HMS Dartmouth, during the pursuit of and engagement with Austrian cruisers in the Strait of Otranto which had attacked the Allied drifter line on 14 May 1917. HMS Dartmouth was torpedoed on 15 May 1917 by the German submarine UC-25 after the engagement but he successfully brought his ship safely into port.

Later while commanding submarine HMS E52, he led the action which sunk UC-63 (commanded by Oberleutenant Karsten von Heydebrec) on 1 November 1917 at Goodwin Sands, Dover Straits. For his war service during the Great War he was also appointed Chevalier of the Order of the Légion d'honneur and awarded the Croix de guerre. From April 1920 to March 1922 he was appointed Director of Torpedoes and Mining.

He became Rear Admiral Commanding His Majesty's Australian Fleet between 30 April 1922 and 30 April 1924. He was promoted to rear admiral on 2 November 1923. After his appointment with the Australian Fleet ceased, he commanded the Destroyer Flotilla of the Mediterranean Squadron. He was appointed a Companion of the Order of the Bath in the 1924 Birthday Honours, and Knight Commander of the Order of the British Empire in the 1931 Birthday Honours. He became the Director of Dockyards to the Admiralty from 1928 to 1937.

After retiring on 1 March 1929, he was recalled in September 1939 at the outbreak of the Second World War. He retired in April 1946, and died on 13 November 1952.

== Notes ==
Military offices
Preceded by Rear Admiral John Dumaresq	Rear Admiral Commanding HM Australian Fleet; 1922–1924	Succeeded by Rear Admiral Thomas Wardle
