= Lowestoft Maritime Museum =

Coordinates: 52°29′16″N 1°45′27″E

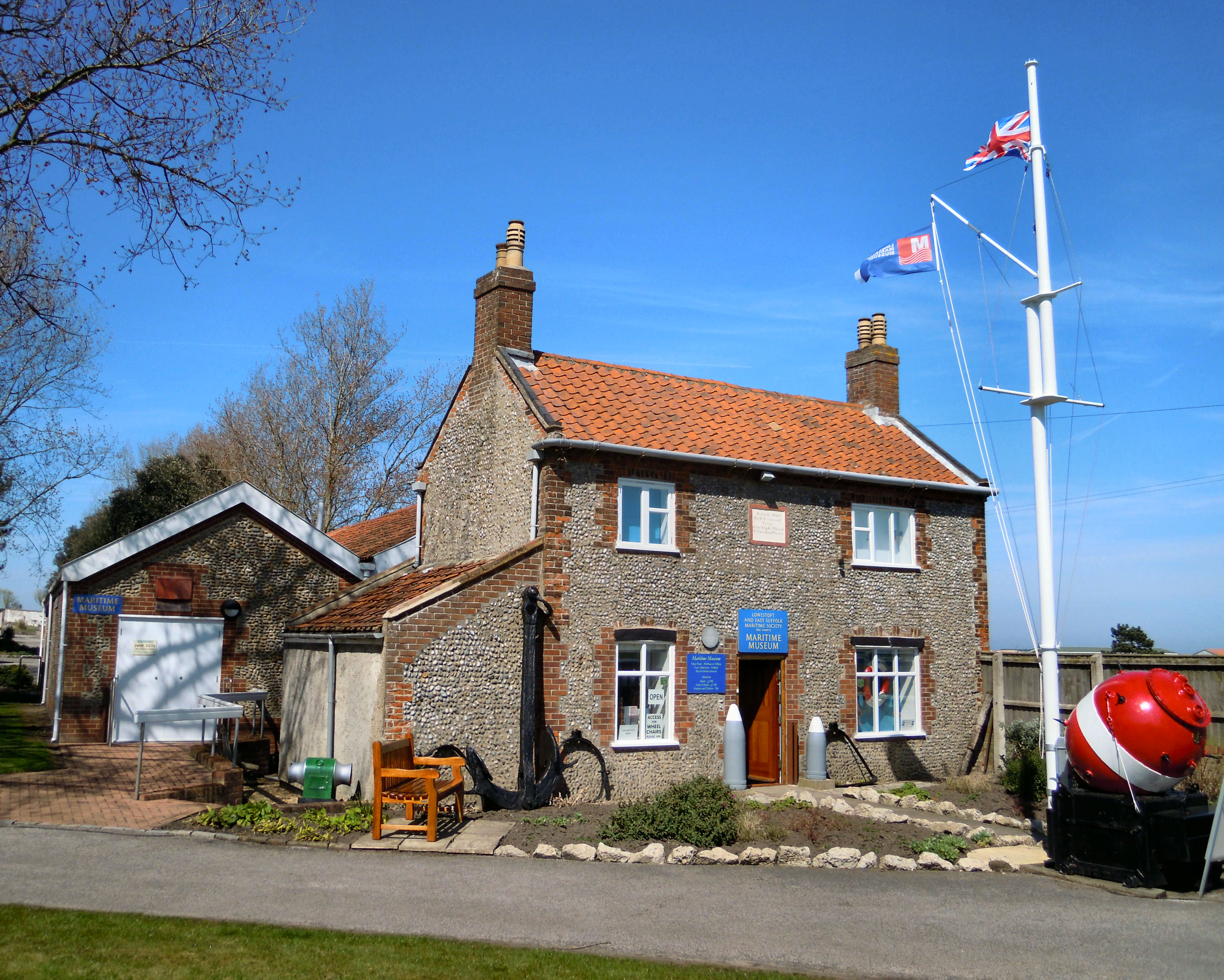
- Lowestoft Maritime Museum in 2016
- Established: 1968
- Location: Sparrows Nest Gardens, Whapload Road, Lowestoft, NR32 1XG
- Type: Maritime museum
- Website: lowestoftmaritimemuseum.co.uk

Lowestoft Maritime Museum is a private museum in the town of Lowestoft in Suffolk, England that is dedicated to local and national maritime history. Its exhibits include maritime artefacts including medals awarded to Royal Navy and RNLI personnel, marine art, the fishing industry in Lowestoft and the town's involvement with the Royal Navy in World War II, shipwrights and coopers tools, an extensive collection of ship models in various scales, the workshop of Christopher Cockerell, the inventor of the hovercraft, and a small display dedicated to Thomas Crisp, a local man who posthumously won the Victoria Cross during World War I. Britain's most easterly museum, it is run by enthusiasts and volunteers and is open to the public from late April to late October each year. The museum was the Suffolk Museum of the Year in 2012 and a finalist in 2014. There is an admission charge.

== History ==
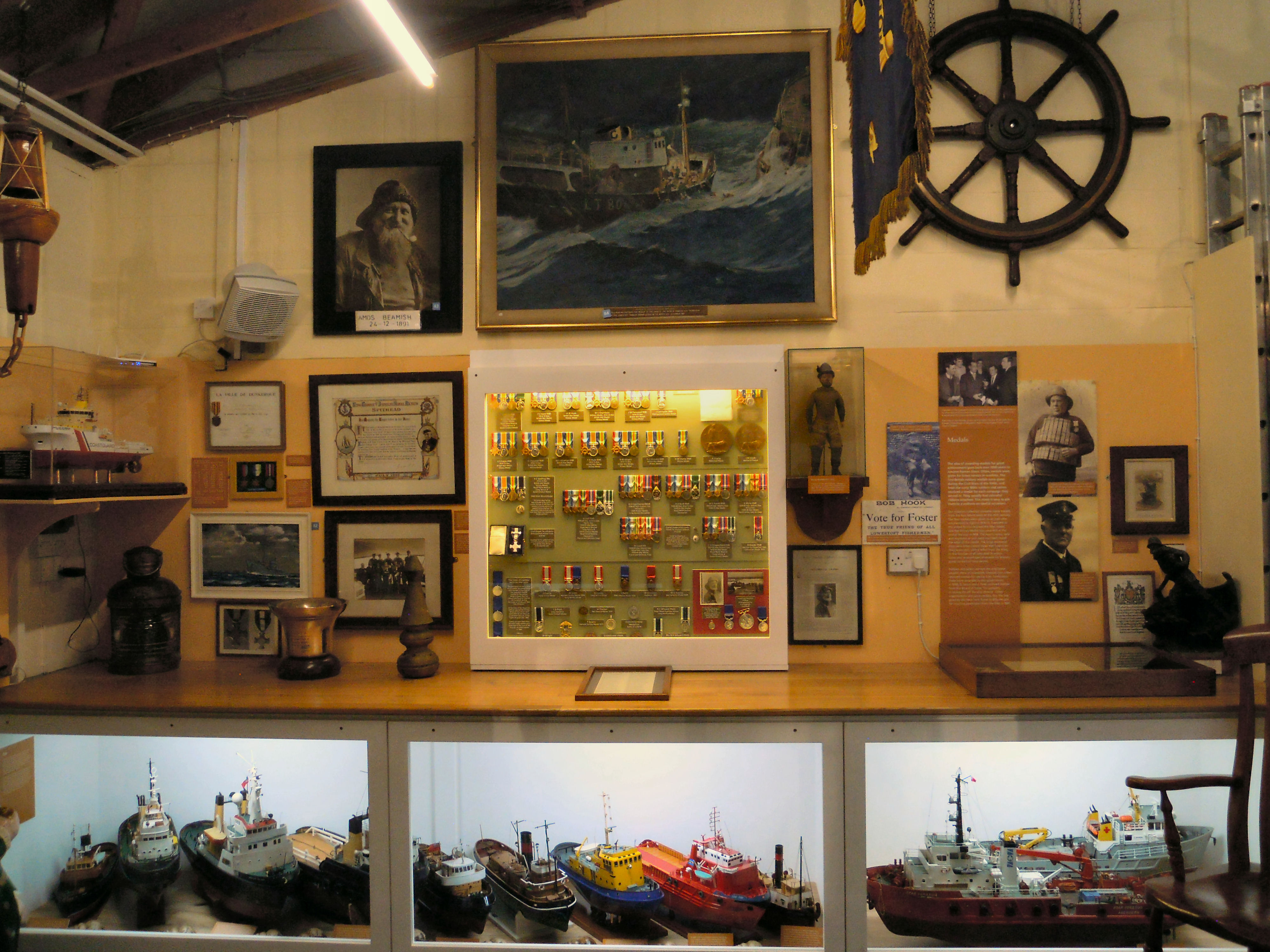
A gallery in the museum

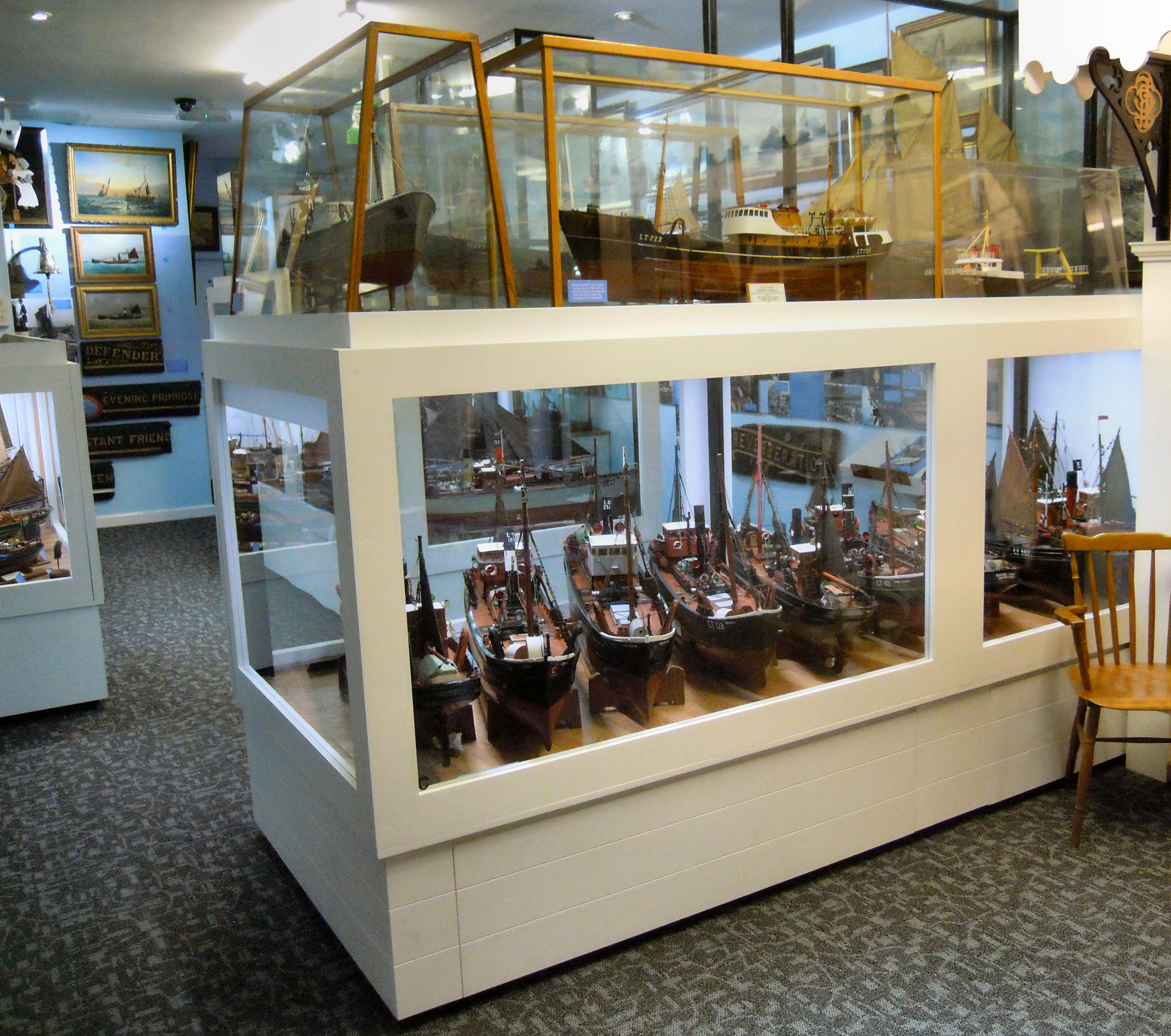
Gallery displaying ship models

The Lowestoft and East Suffolk Maritime Society was founded in 1958 by a number of local maritime enthusiasts including Engineer Captain E.G. Malet-Warden, RN (Retd.), Captain N.C. Darnell, MN (Retd.), and Skipper Lieutenant William 'Bill' Soloman RNPS (Retd.), the latter in particular being mainly responsible for acquiring a substantial part of the collection now at the Maritime Museum.

As the size of the collection increased, in 1968 the Borough Council granted the Society the lease of a period cottage in Sparrow's Nest Park in Lowestoft to house a permanent Maritime Museum. Each room in the cottage was initially dedicated to various aspects of the fishing industry in addition to a special display on the Royal Naval Patrol Service, the headquarters of which for both World wars was located in the adjacent Sparrow's Nest Park, named as HMS Europa.

As the collection continued to grow in size and scope, in 1977 the cottage was extended at the cost of £10,000, which was raised through donations and fund-raising activities. The "Bill Soloman Room" was named in honour of Skipper "Bill" Soloman who had largely been responsible for acquiring and setting up the collection and who had recently died. This extension was opened in 1978 by Prince Philip. In 2010 the museum gained a Heritage Lottery Fund grant which enabled a major overhaul of the displays through a new extension. This was opened by Princess Anne in 2010. In March 2016 the museum received its Arts Council Accreditation.

== Exhibits ==
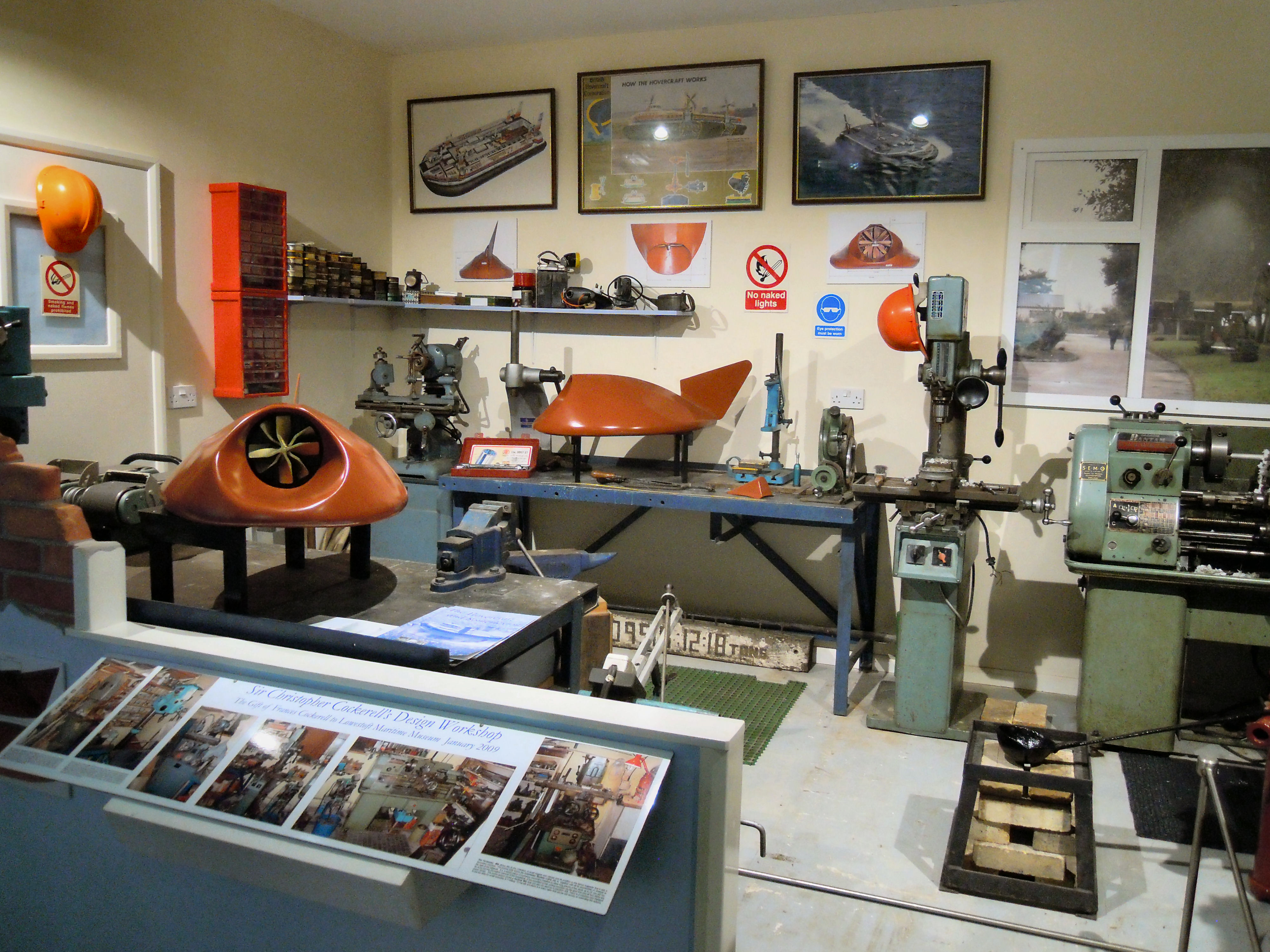
Sir Christopher Cockerell's workshop

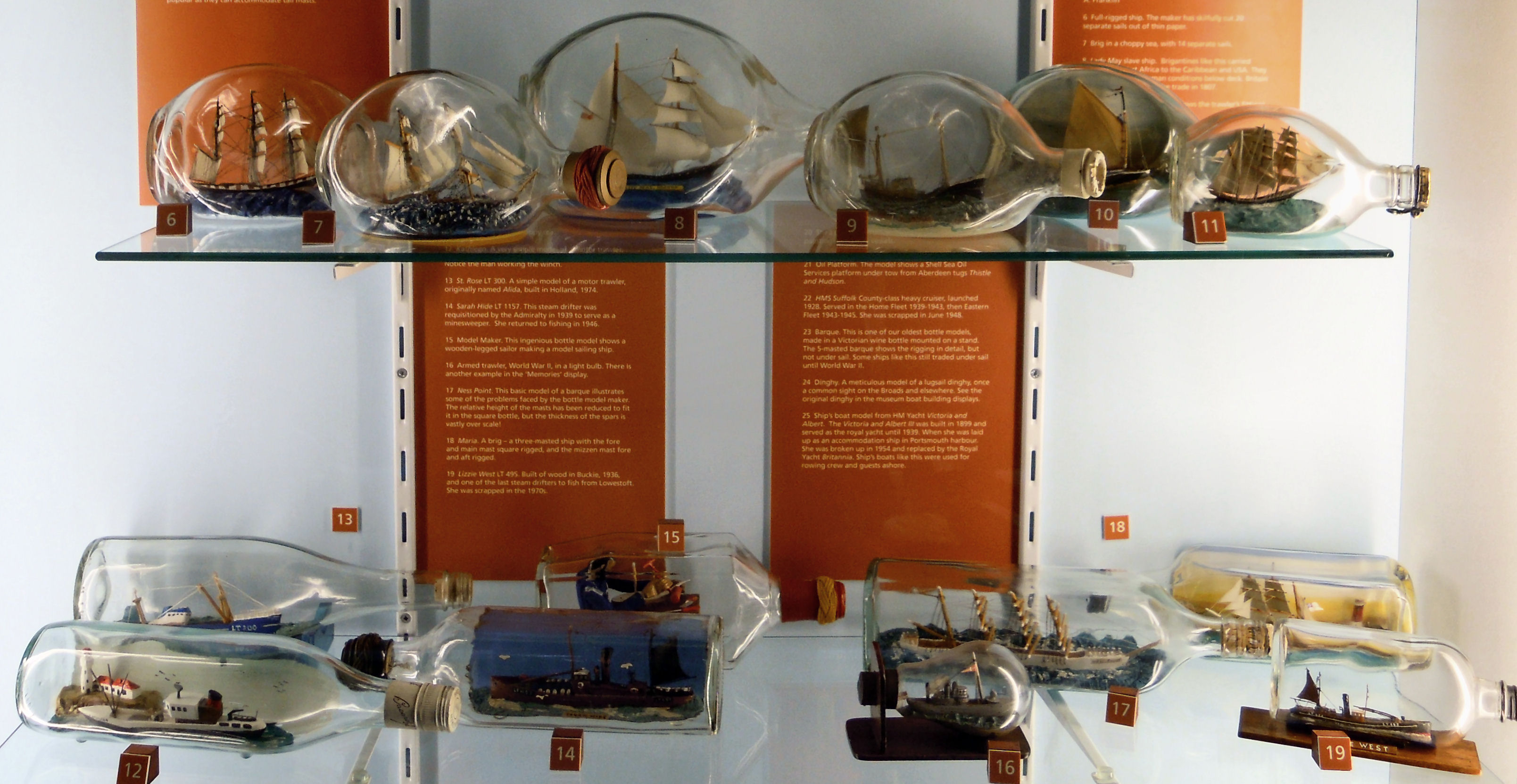
Some of the museum's collection of ships in bottles

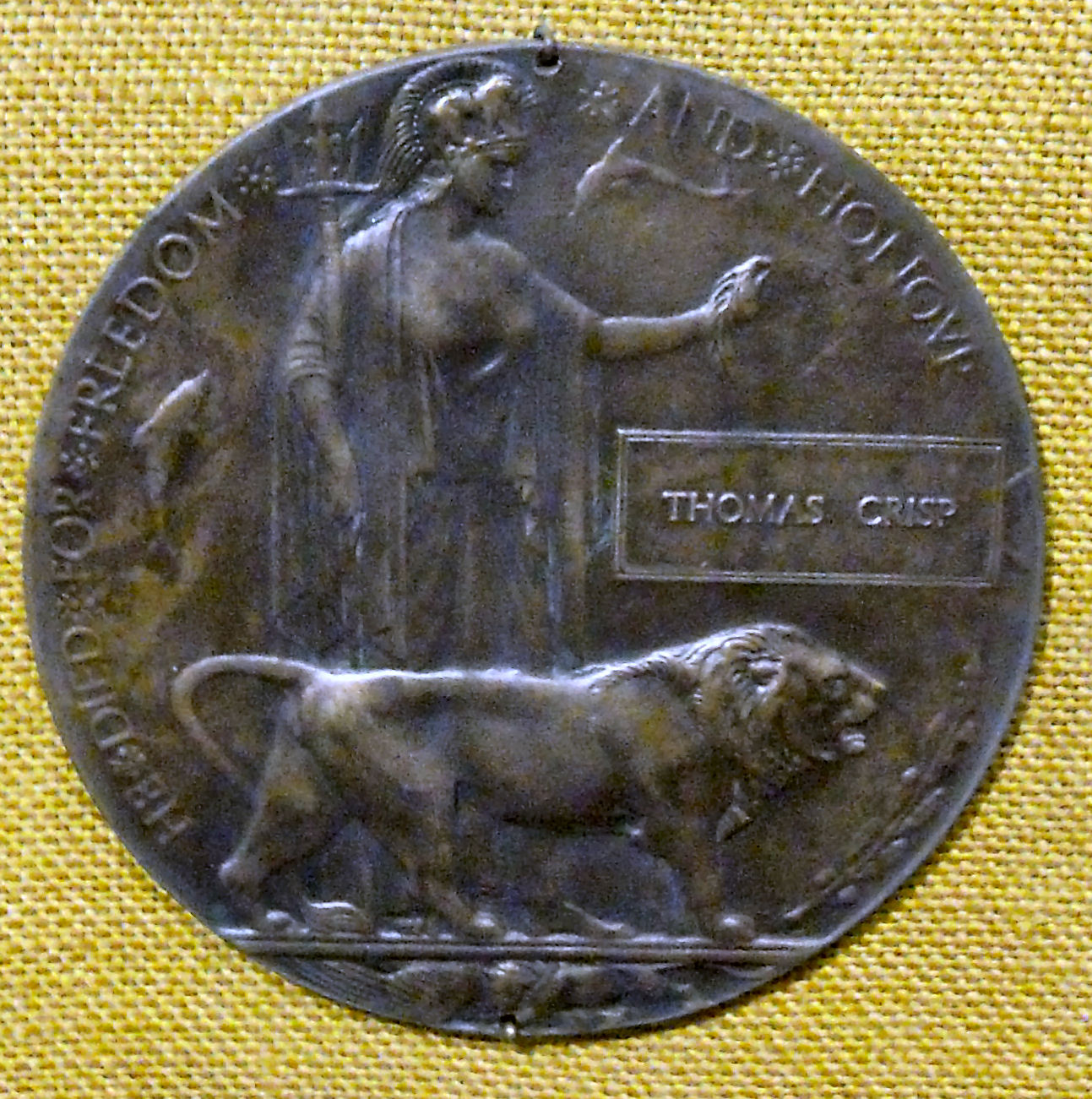
Memorial Plaque named to Thomas Crisp VC

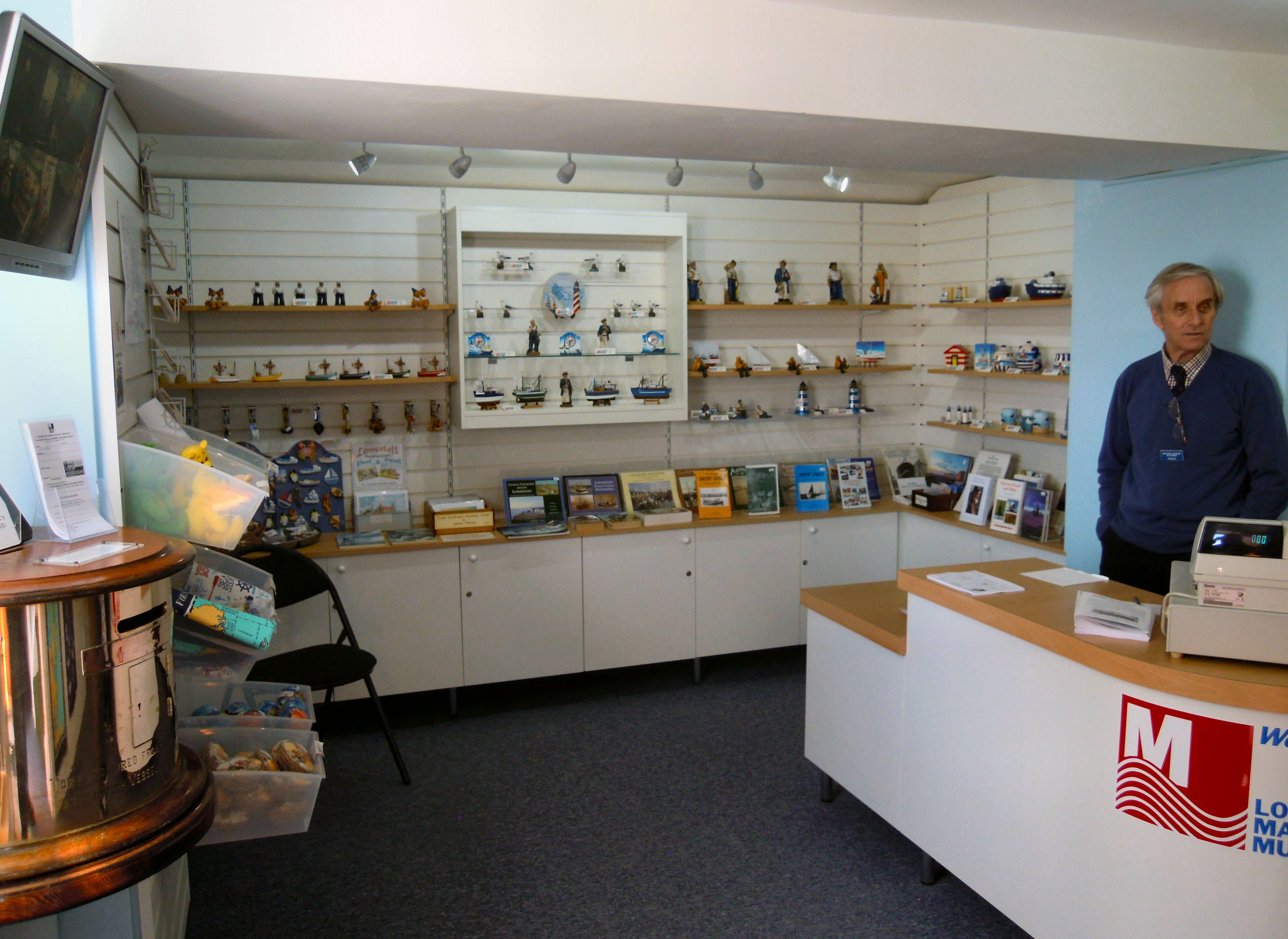
The Museum Shop

The exhibits on display include a wide range of maritime artefacts including a display of medals awarded to naval and RNLI personnel, a large display of marine art and ships in bottles, the fishing industry in Lowestoft and the town's involvement with the Royal Navy in World War II, a workbench of shipwrights and coopers tools, an extensive collection of ship models in various scales, the workshop of Christopher Cockerell, the inventor of the hovercraft, reassembled at the museum following his death in 1999 and which displays his original tools and machinery including his left-handed lathe, a display about Robert William Hook (1828–1911), coxswain at RNLI Lowestoft from 1853 to 1883 who was credited with saving more than 600 lives during his career, and a small display dedicated to Thomas Crisp, a local man who posthumously won the Victoria Cross during World War I, including his original Memorial Plaque.

Other exhibits range from interactive displays for children including a maritime identification trail, Lowestoft's connection with Madam Prunier and her London restaurant, a range of historic photographs and paintings, Lowestoft at war, a reconstruction of a ship's wheelhouse with working VHS radio to listen into passing ships and a small museum cinema showing archive films.

A shop sells a variety of maritime-themed goods.
