= Action of 15 August 1917 =

- Part of World War I
Date	15 August 1917
Location	off Humber estuary, North Sea 52.950000°N 2.416670°E
Result	Two British ships sunk

Belligerents
Royal Navy	Imperial German Navy

Commanders and leaders
(United Kingdom) Thomas Crisp † (United Kingdom) William “Johnsey” Manning (MIA)	(German Empire) (possibly Kpt. Karsten von Heydebreck)

Strength
2 armed smacks	1 U-boat (possibly SM UC-63)

Casualties and losses
1 killed, 7 missing 2 ships sunk	unknown

The action of 15 August 1917 was a naval engagement which occurred during the First World War. The action was fought between a German U-boat (believed to be SM UC-63) and two naval trawlers, Nelson and Ethel & Millie, in the North Sea.

== Background ==
As part of the Imperial German Navy's U-boat campaign of unrestricted submarine warfare German U-boats had started to attack British trawlers (which had previously been protected by the 1907 Naval Convention) in the North Sea. In response to this, fishermen had requested weapons for self-defence, and a number of trawlers been equipped with deck guns, and had gunners assigned to man them. These vessels were generally skippered by men who were members of the Royal Navy Reserve, but were left to continue fishing, and act on their own initiative if attacked, rather than coming under Royal Navy command.

== Action ==
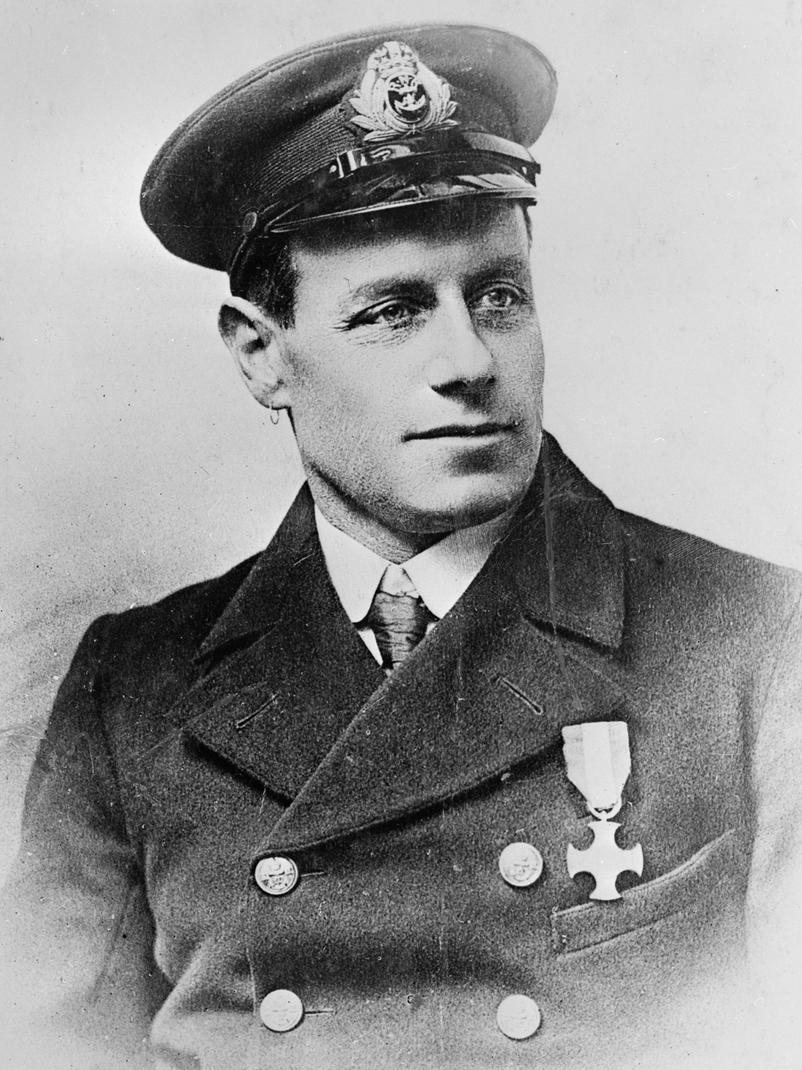
Thomas Crisp, VC, DSC

On 15 August 1917, a number of Lowestoft trawlers were fishing in the North Sea, off the Jim Howe bank. Among them were the armed smacks Nelson and Ethel & Millie. Nelson—skippered by Thomas Crisp—was armed with a 3-pounder gun; Ethel & Millie—skippered by William “Johnsey” Manning—carried a 6-pounder.

At around 14:45, Nelson came under fire from a U-boat, which had surfaced some 3–4 mi (2.6–3.5 nmi; 4.8–6.4 km) north-west of her position. Crisp cast off his nets—leaving them buoyed on the surface—and turned Nelson toward the U-boat to close the range. Nelson was hit several times; she returned fire, but the shots fell short of their target. Crisp was also hit, and mortally wounded by one of the U-boat's shells, and Nelson began to take on water and sink. At this point, Crisp ordered the crew to abandon ship, which they did, taking to a lifeboat. During this exchange, Ethel & Millie had closed up from the south-east, and, passing Nelson and her lifeboat, moved in to engage the U-boat. Manning proposed to stop and take on the survivors, but they refused, as he was not yet in range of the U-boat. Ethel & Millie continued to close, but she too came under fire from the U-boat, and after several hits, she too was left sinking, her crew also abandoning ship. Nelson's crew observed the men being taken from their boat, and lined up on the U-boat's deck, but were unable to see more as the view became obscured by the haze. Nelson's boat pulled away to the southwest, and escaped into the approaching dusk.

== Aftermath ==
Nelson's crew were at sea for the next two days, being eventually rescued by HMS Dryad, a minesweeper assigned to fishery protection. Crisp's actions were reported and he was awarded the Victoria Cross for the "seamanlike and brave manner" in which he had conducted himself. Ethel & Millie's crew were not seen again; they were not reported as prisoners of war and none returned to Britain at the end of hostilities. The suspicion at the time, and subsequently, is that they were disposed of by the U-boat crew, for example by being left to drown while the U-boat submerged. The U-boat which attacked the two boats has been identified as UC-63 commanded by Karsten von Heydebreck.
