= Armed trawler Ethel & Millie =

History

United Kingdom
- Name: Ethel & Millie
- Launched: 1908
- In service: Feb-Aug 1917
- Fate: Sunk 15 August 1917
- Notes: Converted to armed merchantman at Lowestoft

General characteristics
- Type: armed smack
- Tonnage: 58 gross tons
- Propulsion: sail
- Armament: 1 × 6 pounder naval gun

The Armed trawler Ethel & Millie was a British auxiliary warship which served during World War I. She was built in 1908 as the fishing smack Ethel & Millie, operating from Lowestoft and registered as LT 200. In early 1917 she was armed for defence against U-boat attack, and fought two actions against them. She was sunk in action on 15 August 1917.

== Background ==
Ethel & Millie was a 58-ton trawling smack, built and registered at Lowestoft in 1908. Prior to the First World War she had an uneventful career as part of the fishing fleet there, operating out into the North Sea fishing grounds. In 1917 German U-boats had started to attack British trawlers, and in response to this, a number of trawlers were armed for self defence. Ethel & Millie was one of these vessels, being equipped with a 6-pounder gun and assigned a naval rating as gunner. In this manner she entered service in February 1917, under the command of skipper Wharton, and carrying the name Boy Alfred.

== Service history ==
On 1 February 1917 Boy Alfred, whilst in company with another armed smack, I’ll Try under the command of skipper Tom Crisp, the boats were approached by two U-boats closing in on the surface. One of the U-boats, which were not identified, closed in on Boy Alfred and ordered her crew to abandon ship. As it was in range Wharton opened fire and the U-boat sank from view, presumed destroyed ("and that was the end of that sub"). The other submerged and engaged in a two-hour cat-and-mouse game with I’ll Try, ending when the U-boat surfaced and attempted to torpedo her. This missed, and the U-boat sank under I'll Try's counter-fire. Both U-boats were adjudged to have been destroyed, and skippers Wharton and Crisp were awarded the DSC and an Admiralty bounty, but post-war examination of records showed no U-boats sunk that day.

== Fate ==
On 15 August 1917 the trawler, now renamed Ethel & Millie and under command of William "Johnsey" Manning, was fishing off the Humber. She was again in the company of I’ll Try, now sailing under the name Nelson. In the afternoon of the 15th Nelson was attacked by an unidentified U-boat (believed to be SM UC-63), which fired on her at long range. She was crippled with gun-fire and left sinking. Manning brought Ethel & Millie into the fray, attempting to close and return fire, but she was out-ranged and set ablaze by the U-boat's fire. Manning and the seven-man crew abandoned ship, taking to their lifeboat, but were picked up by the U-boat. They were last seen, by the survivors of Nelson, lined up on the U-boats deck.

They were not reported as prisoners of war, and none returned to Britain at the end of hostilities. The suspicion at the time, and subsequently, is that they were disposed of by the U-boat crew, for example by being left to drown while the U-boat submerged. The German government had made it clear they regarded the crews of merchant ships who fought back against U-boat attacks as francs-tireurs, and thus liable to execution, as had happened in the Fryatt case.
