= Smack (ship) =

Sailing ship type

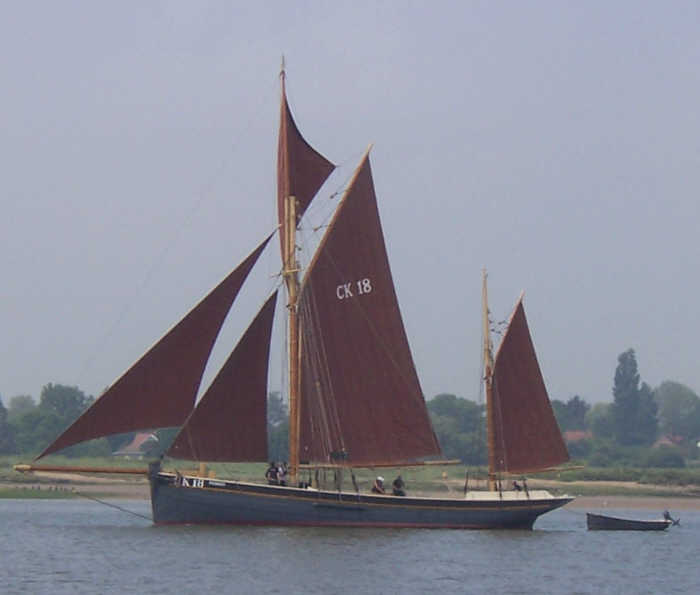
A smack near Brightlingsea

A smack was a traditional fishing boat used off the coast of Britain and the Atlantic coast of America for most of the 19th century and, in small numbers, up to the Second World War. Many larger smacks were originally cutter-rigged sailing boats until about 1865, when smacks had become so large that cutter main booms had grown unwieldy. The smaller smacks retained the Gaff rig. The larger smacks were lengthened and re-rigged and new ketch-rigged smacks were built, but boats varied from port to port. Some boats had a topsail on the mizzen mast, while others had a bowsprit carrying a jib.

Large numbers of smacks operated in fleets from ports in the UK such as Brixham, Grimsby and Lowestoft as well as at locations along the Thames Estuary. In England the sails were white cotton until a proofing coat was applied, usually after the sail was a few years old. This gave their sails a distinctive red ochre colour, which made them a picturesque sight in large numbers. As new propulsive technologies filtered out into general use, smacks were often candidates for refurbishment into steam boats in the 1950s.

Smacks were developed to transport live lobsters during the late 18th century. They were designed to allow seawater to circulate in a tank with holes in it.

== Military use ==
Smacks were used in British coastal waters during World War I as Q-ships. Actions involving smacks include the action of 15 August 1917, when the armed smacks Nelson and Ethel & Millie engaged a German U-boat in the North Sea. During this action the Nelson was sunk and its skipper, Thomas Crisp, was posthumously awarded the Victoria Cross. Another Lowestoft smack, HM Armed Smack Inverlyon, commanded by Ernest Jehan, sank the German U-boat UB-4 earlier in the war, the only example of a wooden sailing vessel sinking a modern steel submarine.

== Current use ==
Some old smacks have been re-rigged into ketches and are now used as training boats for young sailors. Other smacks are preserved in museums or used as floating museums.

The Excelsior is an example of a preserved smack. Built in Lowestoft in 1921, she is a member of the National Historic Fleet and operates as a sail training vessel. Boadicea is another example of a well-preserved smaller smack. She was built in Maldon, Essex, in 1808. The last working Class One East Coast Smack, Britannia, built in King's Lynn in 1914 and currently undergoing a restoration in Devon, was scheduled to be relaunched in April 2022 though that has been delayed. She was returned to the water in September 2023, but restoration work continues. When complete, she will be used as a sail training vessel operating out of Cornwall.

== See also ==
- Well smack
- HM Armed Smack Inverlyon
