= Department of the Director of Underwater Weapons Materials =

Former department of the British Admiralty

Department overview
- Formed: 1917
- Preceding Department: Torpedo Department
- Dissolved: 1958
- Jurisdiction: (United Kingdom)
- Headquarters: Admiralty, London, England
- Department executive: Director of Underwater Weapons Materials

The Department of the Director of Underwater Weapons Materials originally known as the Torpedo Department was a former department of the British Department of Admiralty from 1917 to 1958 when it became the Underwater Weapons Division of the Weapons Department.

== History ==
During the First World War in April 1917 the Torpedo Department of the Naval Ordnance Department was made a separate department in its own right this became known as the Department of the Director of Torpedoes and Mining. Following World War Two in 1946 it was renamed the Department of the Director of Underwater Weapons until October 1956 when it was renamed the Department of the Director of Underwater Weapons Materials. In 1958 the Naval Ordnance Department and this department became divisions of the new Weapons Department.

== Head of Department ==
Included:

=== Directors of Torpedoes and Mining ===
1. Rear-Admiral the Hon. Edward S. Fitzherbert: April 1917 – June 1918
2. Captain Frederick L. Field: June 1918 – April 1920
3. Captain Albert P. Addison: April 1920 – March 1922
4. Captain Leonard A.B.Donaldson: March 1922 – May 1924
5. Captain Brien M. Money: May 1924 – October 1926
6. Captain Arthur H. Walker: October 1926 – December 1928
7. Captain Brian Egerton: December 1928 – December 1931
8. Captain Henry R.Sawbridge: December 1931 – April 1934
9. Captain William B. Mackenzie: April 1934 – October 1935
10. Captain W. Frederic Wake-Walker: October 1935 – January 1938
11. Captain John U.P.Fitzgerald: January 1938 – February 1940
12. Captain Henry C. Phillips: February 1940 – February 1942
13. Captain Gervase B. Middleton: February 1942 – January 1943 (later Admiral)
14. Captain Anthony Fane de Salis: February 1943 – November 1944
15. Captain William W. Davis: November 1944 – February 1946

=== Directors of Underwater Weapons ===
Included:

1. Captain William W. Davis: February 1946 – January 1947
2. Captain R. Oliver Bellasis: January 1947 – October 1948
3. Captain A. H. Wallis: June 1953 – October 1956

=== Directors of Underwater Weapons Materials ===
Included:

1. Captain R. E. Portlock: October 1956 – January 1958

==== Deputy Directors of Torpedoes and Mining ====
Included:

1. Captain Herbert N. Garnett: April 1919 – January 1921
2. Captain Wion de M. Egerton: January 1921 – November 1922
3. Captain Henry D. Bridges: November 1922 – August 1924
4. Captain Patrick E. Parker: August 1924 – September 1926
5. Captain Leonard F. Potter: September 1926 – March 1929
6. Captain Charles O. Alexander: March 1929 – September 1931
7. Captain John F.B. Carslake: September 1931 – February 1936
8. Captain Gervase B. Middleton: February 1936 – April 1938
9. Captain Norman V. Grace: May 1938 – April 1940
10. Captain Gervase B. Middleton: April 1940 – February 1942
11. Captain Edmund G. Abbott: December 1941 – September 1944
12. Captain Anthony Fane de Salis: February 1942 – February 1943
13. Captain Cecil R.L. Parry: September 1944 – 1946

==== Deputy Directors of Underwater Weapons ====
Included

1. Captain Cecil R.L. Parry: September 1946 – August 1948
2. Captain C. Hale: August 1948 – October 1948
3. Captain A. B. Cole: August November 1955 – October 1956

==== Deputy Directors of Underwater Weapons Materials ====
1. Captain M. R. G. Wingfield: September 1957 – January 1958

==== Deputy Directors of Underwater Weapons (Bath) ====
Included

1. Captain L. F. Durnford Slater: 1946 – October 1948
2. Captain Engineer W. S. C. Jenks: April 1955 – October 1956

==== Deputy Directors of Underwater Weapons Materials (Bath) ====
1. Captain Engineer W. S. C. Jenks: October 1956 – January 1958

==== Deputy Directors of Underwater Weapons (A/S) ====
Included

1. Captain J. G. Farrant: October 1945 – October 1948 (acting)

Note: Post abolished

== Sources ==
1. Great Britain, Admiralty (January 1958). The Navy List. London, England: HM Stationery Office.
2. Great Britain, Admiralty (July 1946). The Navy List. London, England: HM Stationery Office.
3. Great Britain, Admiralty (October 1948). The Navy List. London, England: HM Stationery Office.
4. Great Britain, Admiralty (April 1956). The Navy List. London, England: HM Stationery Office.
5. Mackie, Colin (January 2018). "Royal Navy Senior Appointments from 1865: Director of Torpedoes and Mining" (PDF). gulabin.com. C. Mackie.
6. "Records of Naval Ordnance Departments and Establishments". nationalarchives.gov.uk. National Archives UK. 1736–1974. Retrieved 3 February 2019.
7. Whitaker, Joseph (1956). An Almanack by Joseph Whitaker, F.S.A., containing an account of the astronomical and other phenomena ...information respecting the government, finances, population, commerce, and general statistics of the various nations of the world, with special reference to the British empire and the United States. London, England: J Whitaker and Sons.
