= Arthur Horace Walker =

Rear-Admiral Arthur Horace Walker, OBE (17 August 1881 – 3 July 1947) was a British Royal Navy officer who was a Director of Torpedoes and Mining from 1926 to 1929, and a senior naval officer at Hong Kong from 1930 to 1932.

== Naval career ==
Walker joined the Royal Navy, was appointed an acting sub-lieutenant on 15 March 1901 and was confirmed in this rank the following year. He was promoted to lieutenant on 15 March 1902, and in June 1902 was appointed to command the torpedo boat No. 42, serving in the newly created First Submarine Flotilla at Portsmouth. In early 1903 he was reported to transfer to the port flagship at Portsmouth as the No. 42 paid off, and then to HMS Russell on her first commission, but this transfer does not appear to have happened until later that year. He was promoted to the rank of Commander on 30 June 1914, in the 1914 Birthday Honours list, and served as Captain of the torpedo vessel HMS Vesuvius during most of the First World War. Following the War, he was Assistant Director of Torpedoes 1921-1922, and Director of Torpedoes and Mining 1926-1929.

He ended his career as Commodore in Charge at Hong Kong 1930–1932 and retired as Rear admiral in October that year.

Following the outbreak of the Second World War, Walker re-enlisted as staff officer at the Admiralty.
