= William Davis (Royal Navy officer) =

Royal Navy Admiral (1901–1987)

Admiral Sir William Davis GCB DSO & Bar
- Davis in 1960
- Born: 11 October 1901; Shimla, India
- Died: 29 October 1987 (aged 86); Gloucester, Gloucestershire, England
- Military career
- Allegiance: United Kingdom
- Branch: Royal Navy
- Service years: 1915–1960
- Rank: Admiral
- Commands: Home Fleet (1958–60); HMS Mauritius (1943–44)
- Conflicts: First World War; Second World War
- Awards: Knight Grand Cross of the Order of the Bath; Distinguished Service Order & Bar; Mentioned in Despatches (4)

Admiral Sir William Wellclose Davis, GCB, DSO & Bar (11 October 1901 – 29 October 1987) was a British Royal Navy officer who served as Vice Chief of the Naval Staff from 1954 to 1957.

== Early life and education ==
Davis was the elder son of Walter Stewart Davis (1856–1946), of the Indian Political Department, and Georgina (died 1925), daughter of David Ross. The Davis family were landed gentry, of Well Close, Brockworth, Gloucestershire; Davis's middle name came from the family estate. Davis was educated at Summer Fields School in Oxford, the Royal Naval College, Osborne, and the Royal Naval College, Dartmouth.

== Naval career ==
Davis joined the Royal Navy in 1915, during the First World War.

He also saw active service in the Second World War, initially as executive officer on the battlecruiser HMS Hood. From 1940 he was Deputy Director of Plans at the Admiralty and then, from 1943, returned to sea as commander of the cruiser HMS Mauritius, in which he was involved in the Sicily landings, the Normandy landings, and the action at Audierne Bay. From November 1944 to February 1946 he was appointed Director of Torpedoes and Mining.

After the war Davis was made Director of Underwater Weapons at the Admiralty and then, from 1948, chief of staff to the Commander-in-Chief, Home Fleet. He became Naval Secretary in 1950 and Flag Officer, Second in Command of the Mediterranean Fleet in 1952. He went on to be Vice Chief of the Naval Staff in 1954 and Commander-in-Chief, Home Fleet and Commander-in-Chief, Eastern Atlantic Area in 1958. He was First and Principal Naval Aide-de-camp to the Queen from 1959 to 1960. He retired in 1960.

== Family ==
Davis married Lady Gertrude Elizabeth Phipps, daughter of Constantine Phipps, 3rd Marquess of Normanby, on 28 April 1934; they went on to have two sons and two daughters. His first cousin was the actor Stringer Davis, husband of Margaret Rutherford.

Military offices
Preceded by Peveril William-Powlett	Naval Secretary; 1950–1952	Succeeded by Richard Onslow
Preceded by Sir Guy Grantham	Vice Chief of the Naval Staff; 1954–1957	Succeeded by Sir Caspar John
Preceded by Sir John Eccles	Commander in Chief, Home Fleet; 1958–1960	Succeeded by Sir Wilfrid Woods
Honorary titles
Preceded by Sir Guy Grantham	First and Principal Naval Aide-de-Camp; 1959–1960	Succeeded by Sir Caspar John
