= Mincarlo (trawler) =

Preserved British fishing trawler

Coordinates: 52.4720°N 1.7526°E

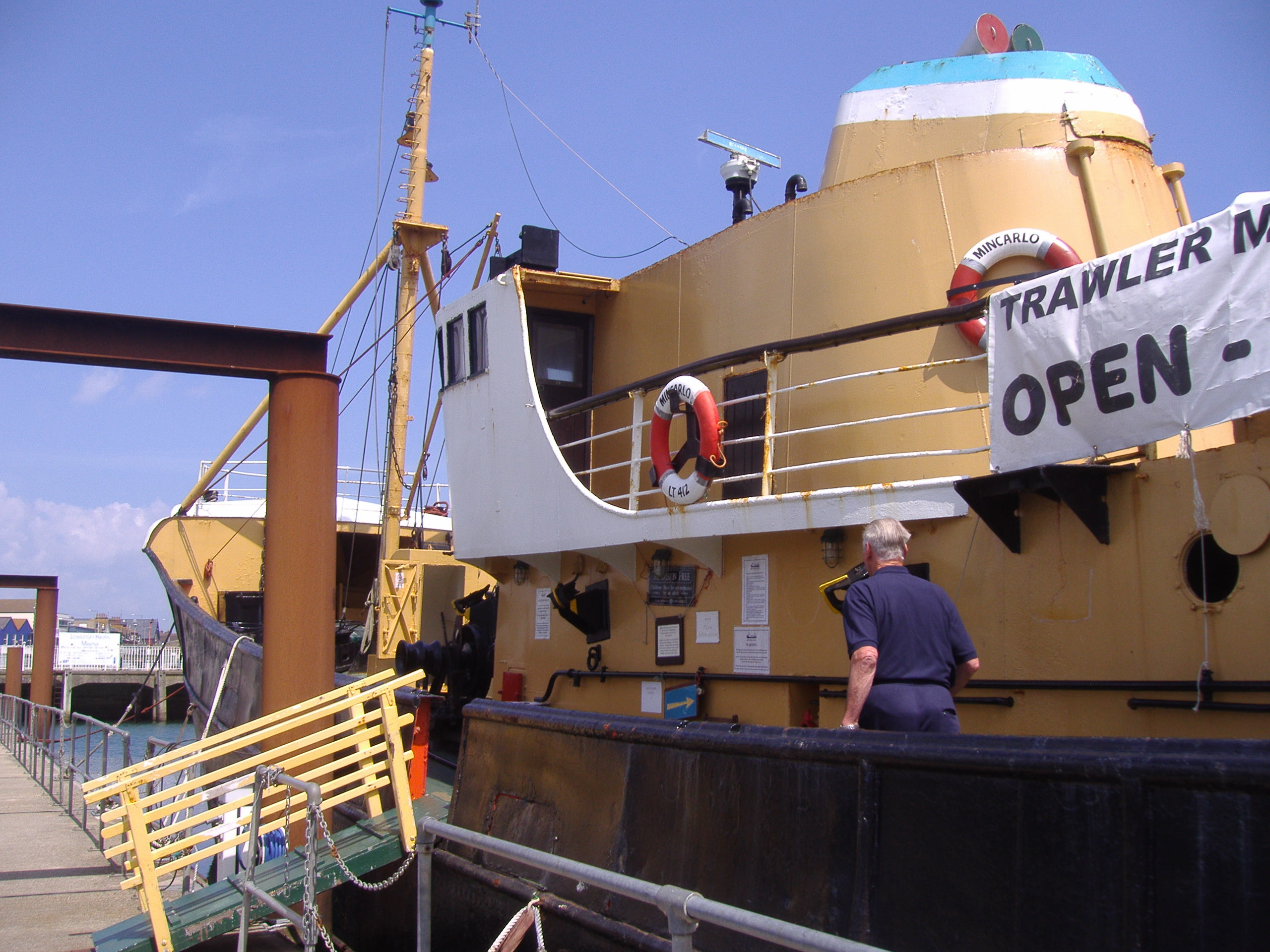

History

United Kingdom
- Name: Mincarlo
- Owner: W H Podd Ltd.; Sold to Putford Enterprises.; Sold to Lydia Eva Trust
- Port of registry: Lowestoft
- Builder: Brooke Marine, Lowestoft
- Cost: £76,600
- Yard number: Yard 281
- Laid down: 1960
- Launched: 25 September 1961
- In service: 28 years
- Identification: IMO number: 5235686; LT412; Reg No: 303677; Call sign: GHXB
- Status: Museum ship: floating
- Notes: Sold to the Lydia Eva Trust for £1 and then preserved.

General characteristics
- Class & type: Sidewinder trawler
- Tonnage: 166 grt, 56 net
- Length: 108.75 ft (33.15 m)
- Beam: 22.7 ft (6.9 m)
- Depth: Moulded: 11.25 ft (3.43 m)
- Installed power: Engine No: 117 by AK Diesels Ltd: 5-cylinder, vertical, 4 stroke cycle, naturally aspirated, developing 500 shp continuously at 320 revs. Driving through an AK Diesel 2:1 ratio reverse reduction gearbox to give a propeller speed of approximately 160rpm.
- Speed: 10 knots (19 km/h)
- Crew: 11
- Notes: Fresh water capacity: 7 tons; Fish Hold Capacity: 5,200 cu ft (150 m^{3}) including 690 cu ft (20,000 L) ice room.

Mincarlo is the last surviving sidewinder fishing trawler of the Lowestoft fishing fleet. She is also the last surviving fishing vessel built in Lowestoft, with an engine made in the town.

== Construction ==
The Mincarlo was built in the Brooke Marine yards in the Suffolk town of Lowestoft. in 1961. She was one of three sister ships built for W.H. Podd Ltd. The other two ships were called Bryher and Rosevear, and along with Mincarlo were named by the Podd family after small islands which make up part of the Isles of Scilly off the Cornish coast. Each of the vessels cost £75,600.

== Sidewinder trawling method ==
The Mincarlo was the type of trawler known as a sidewinder or side trawler. On sidewinders, the trawl nets are deployed over the side with the trawl warps passed through blocks suspended from two gallows. These gallows were forward and aft, on the starboard side of the Mincarlo. The fishing gear consisted of two otter trawls each of which was fitted with otter boards. Otter boards are positioned in such a way that the hydrodynamic forces acting on them when the net is towed along the seabed push the boards outwards to keep the mouth of the net open. The nets were attached to heavy duty ground ropes, 40 feet (12 m) long, which held the nets on the seabed and ticked up any fish lying on or below the sand. Until the late sixties, sidewinders were the most common deep sea boat used in North Atlantic fisheries. They were used for a longer period than other types of trawler.

== Working life ==
Mincarlo was part of the 50 to 60 strong fishing fleet based at the Suffolk seaport of Lowestoft. During her 13 years her catches put her in the top half dozen trawlers of the fleet. Her catches consisted of cod, haddock, plaice, skate and sole. She had been in the ownership W. H. Podd Ltd until she was purchased from them by Putford Enterprises in 1975. At this time Putford Enterprises owned and operated a large fishing fleet, with many vessels at Lowestoft and Grimsby. From the very early days of oil and gas exploration in the southern North Sea, Putford Enterprises along with its fishing craft, also operated many safety standby ships for the offshore oil and gas industry. In 1977 Mincarlo was converted and began a new career as a stand-by vessel in the flourishing southern North Sea gas fields. She was also renamed and was now called Putford Merlin. In 1989 after a career which had spanned 28 years, she was finally replaced by a built for purpose stand-by ship. She was laid-up, back where she began life, at the yard of Brooke's.

== Restoration ==
Mincarlo waiting to enter drydock in 2025

After her working life had finished she was sold by Putford Enterprise to the Lydia Eva Trust Ltd who paid a nominal £1 to Putford. After a period of restoration and refurbishment the Mincarlo was opened to the public in 1998. The Mincarlo is on display at Lowestoft Heritage Quay and is sometimes moved to South Quay at Great Yarmouth. Admission is free.

Mincarlo is now owned by the Lydia Eva and Mincarlo Charitable Trust Ltd, a registered charity, which also owns the preserved herring drifter Lydia Eva.

In January 2015 Mincarlo underwent repairs and restoration. The work was carried out free of charge by Lowestoft-based AKD Engineering as part of their 60th anniversary celebrations.

== Gallery ==
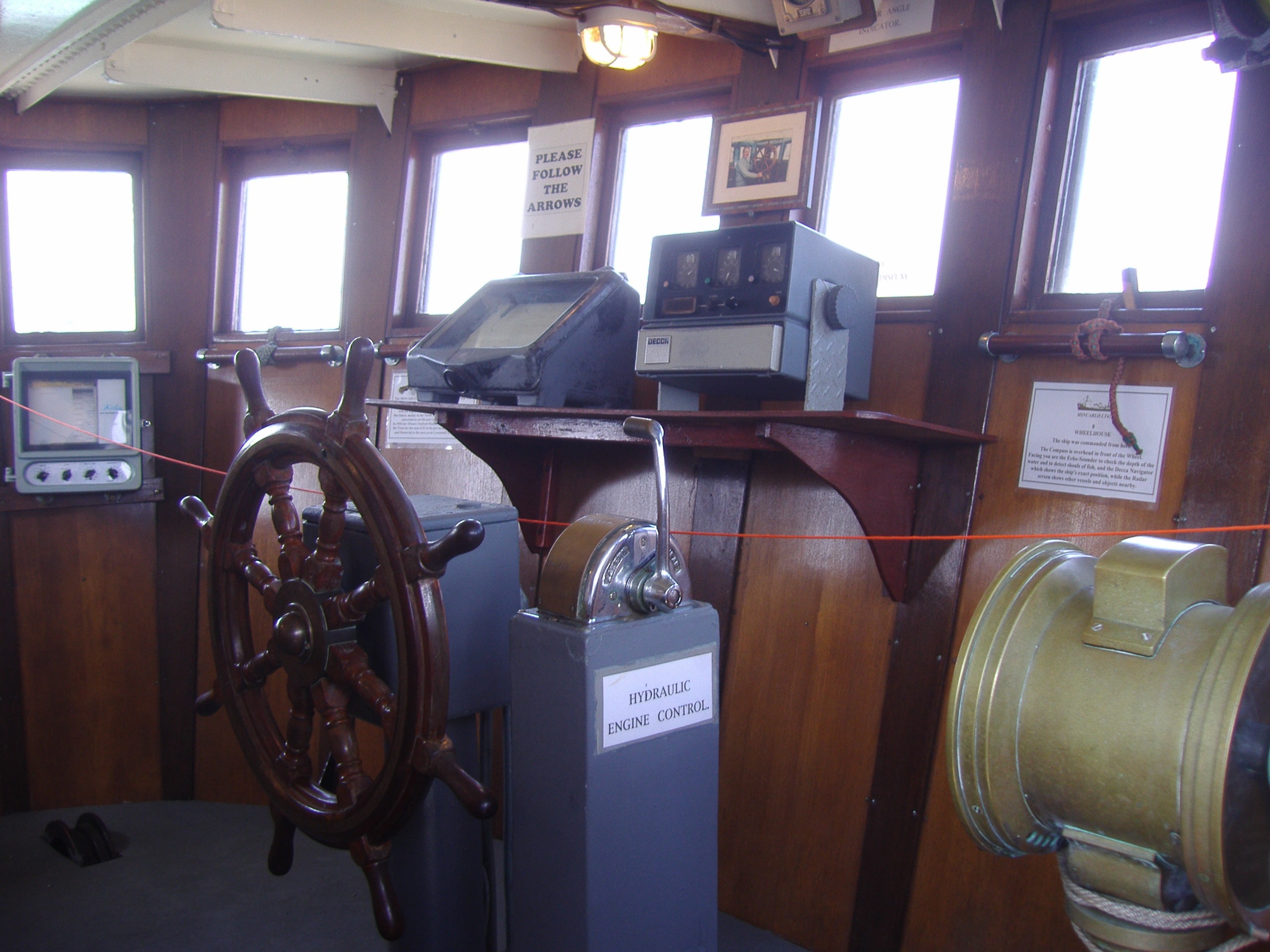
The bridge aboard the Mincarlo

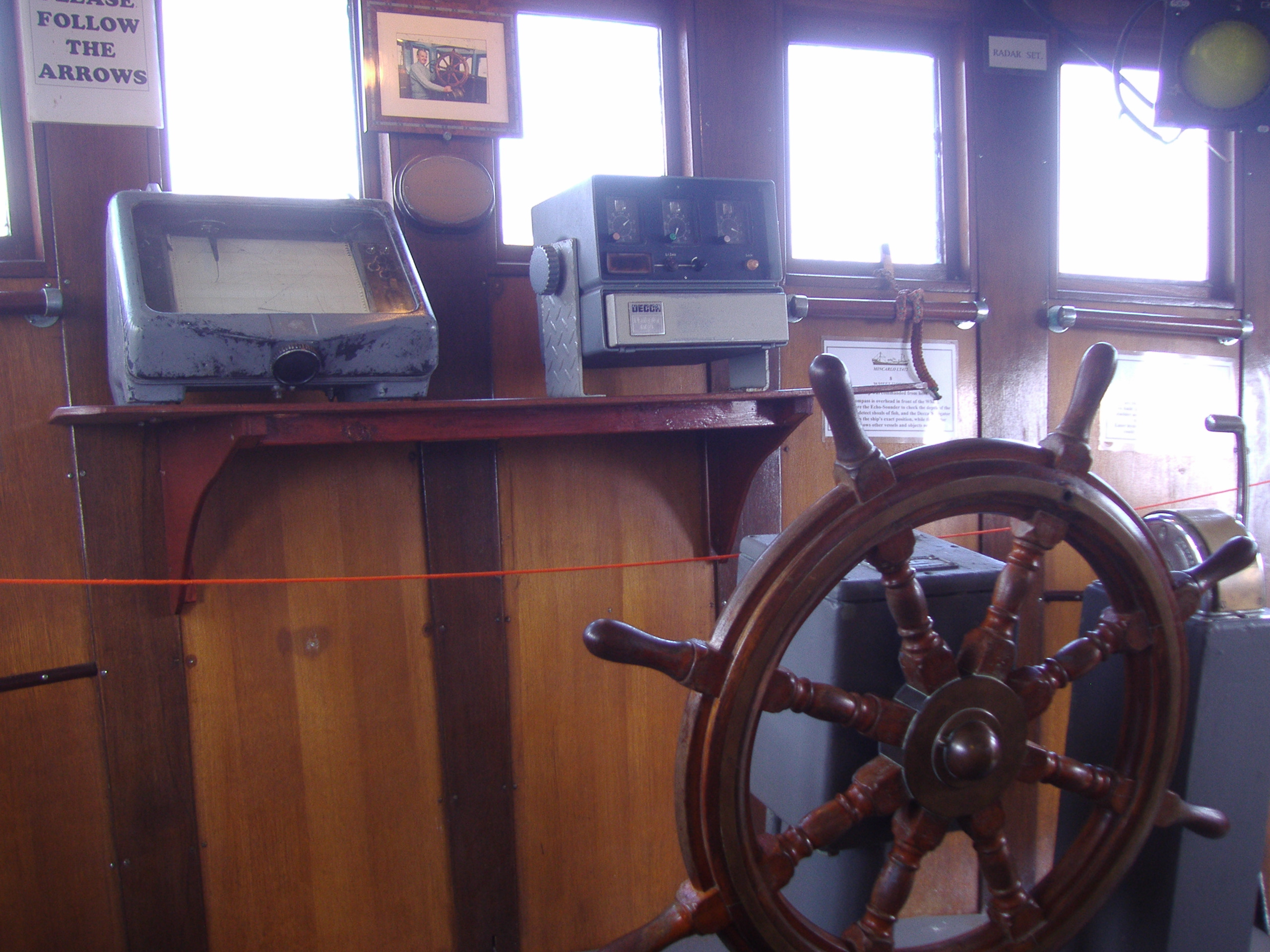
The bridge aboard the Mincarlo

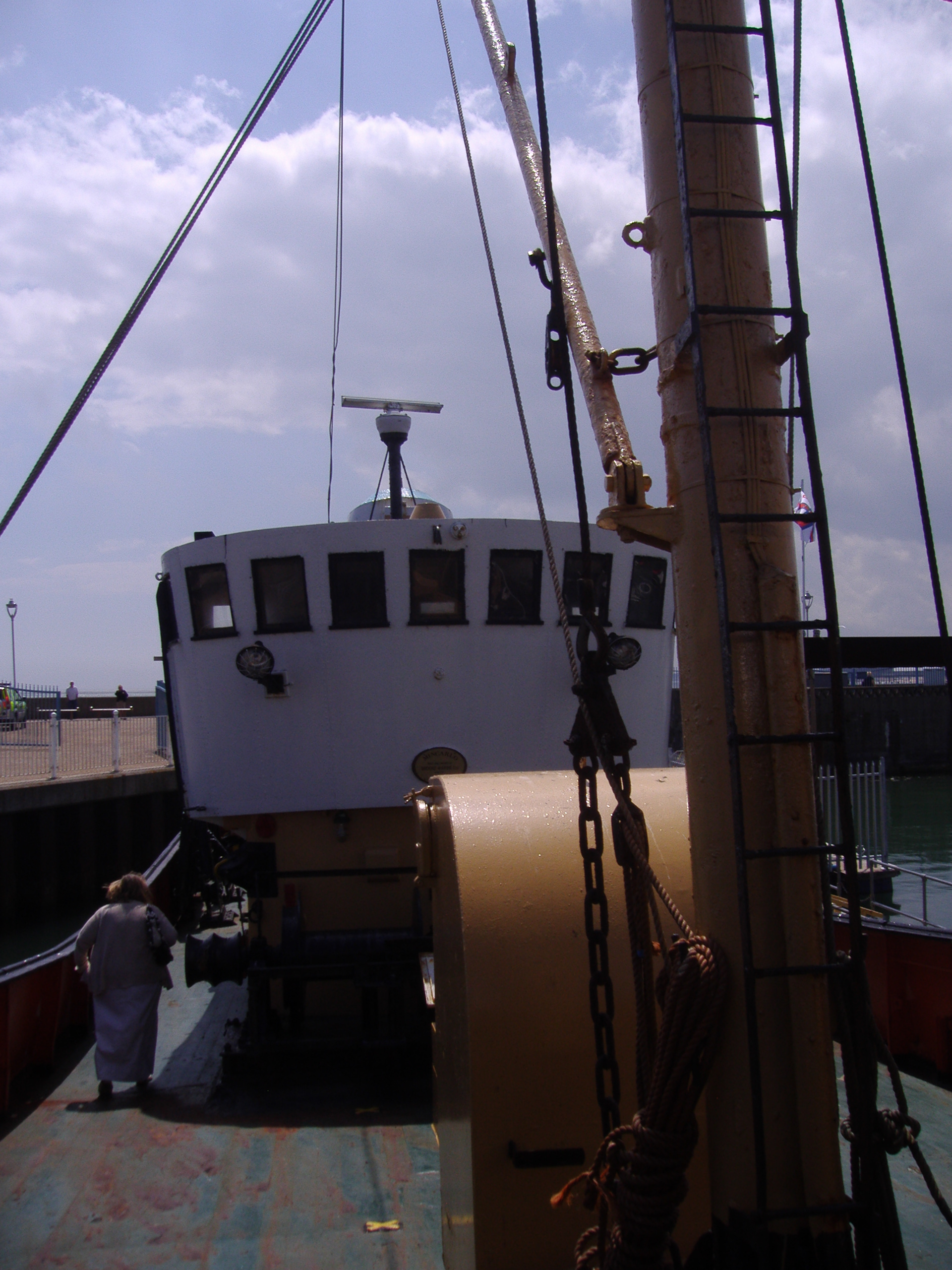
The working deck with the bridge above

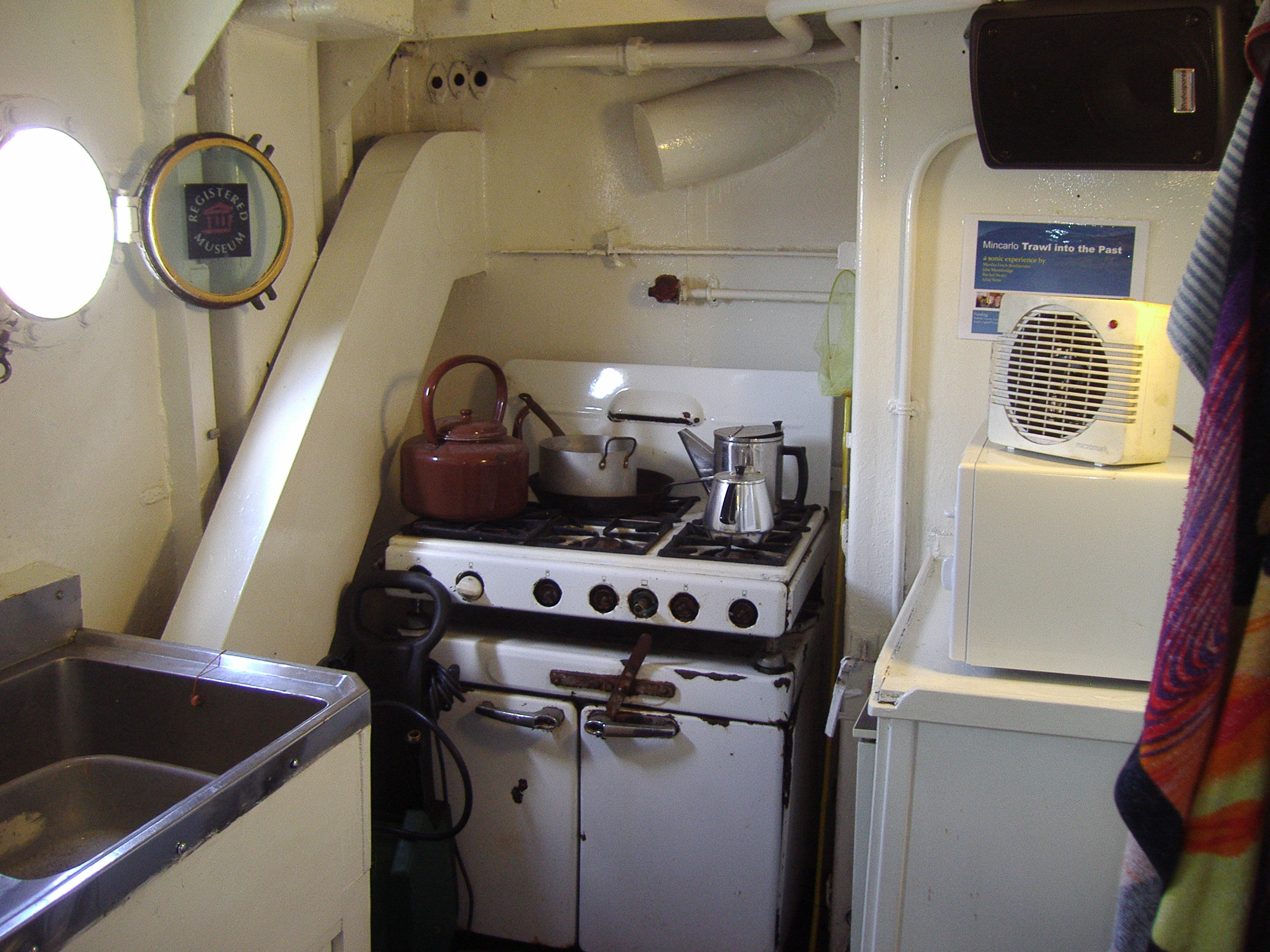
The ship's galley

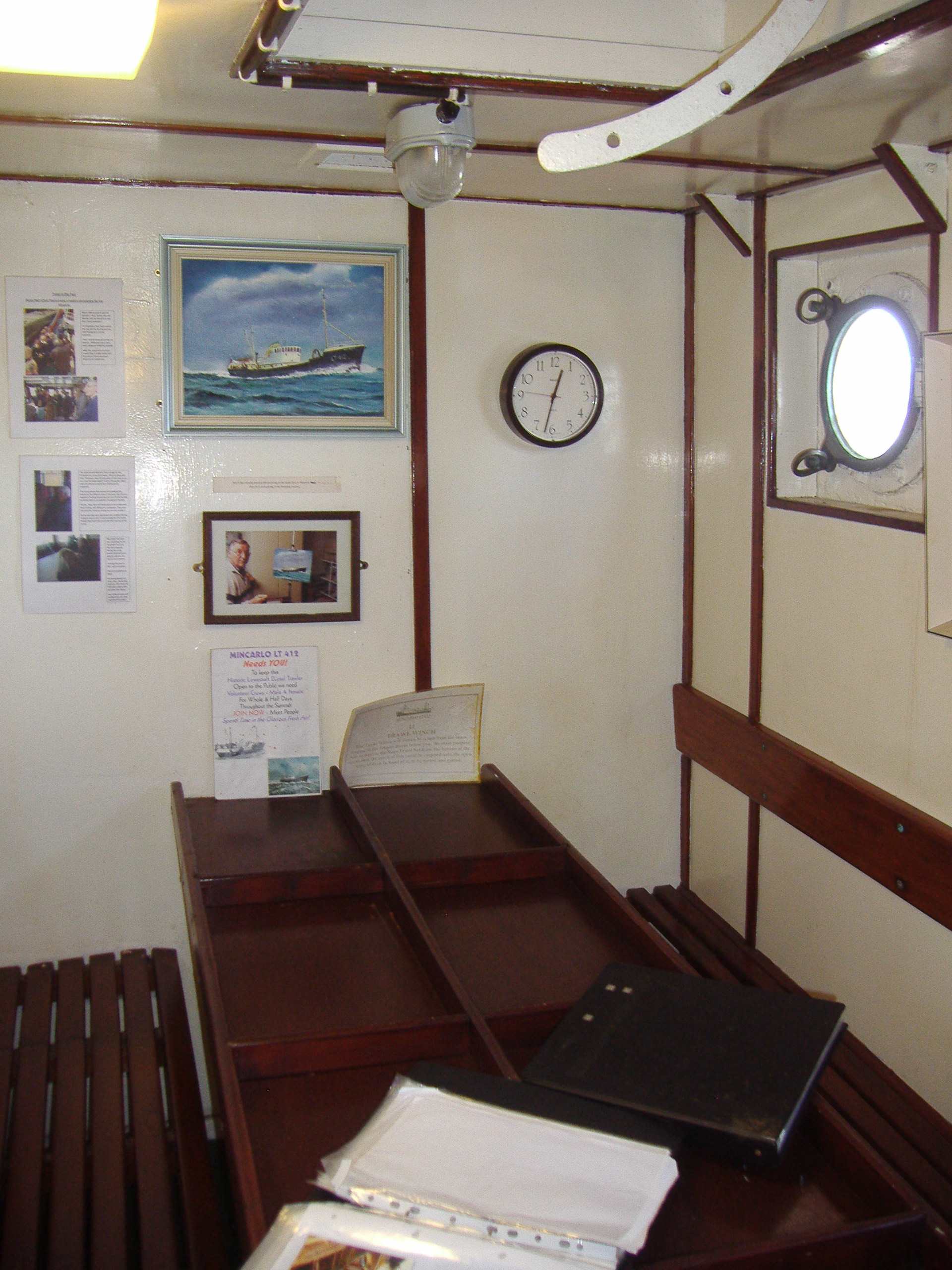
The mess deck

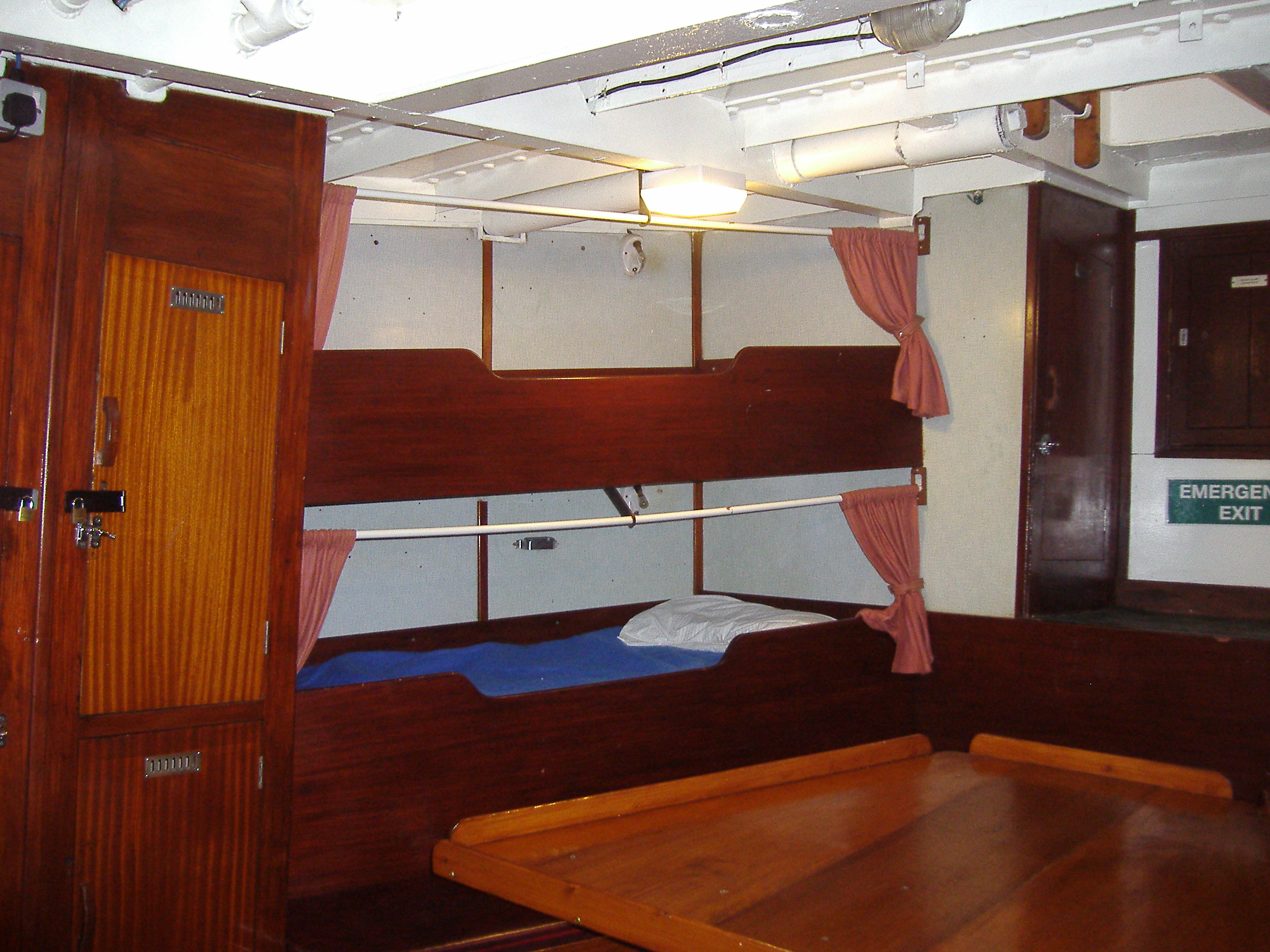
The crew's quarters

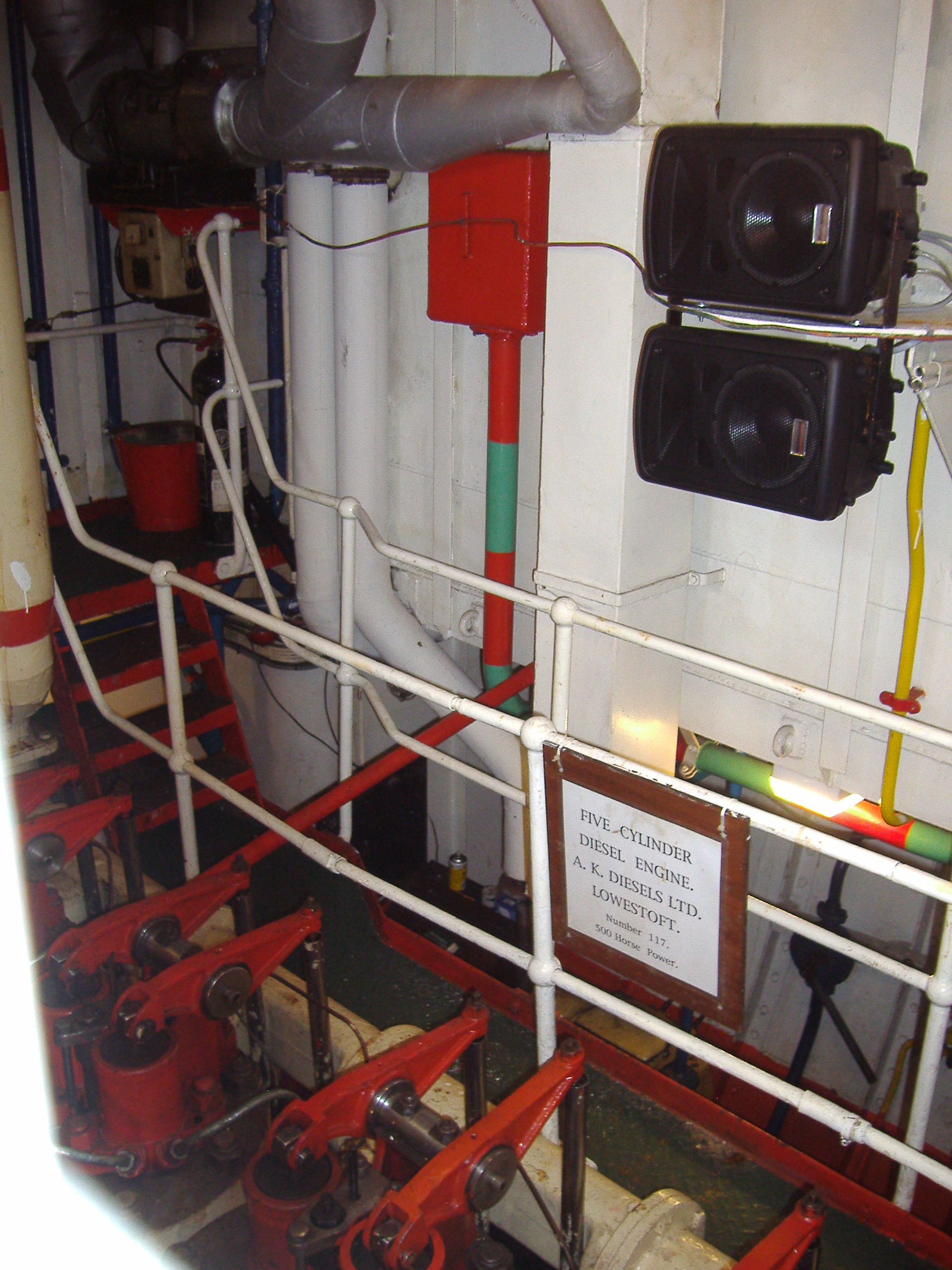
The engine room

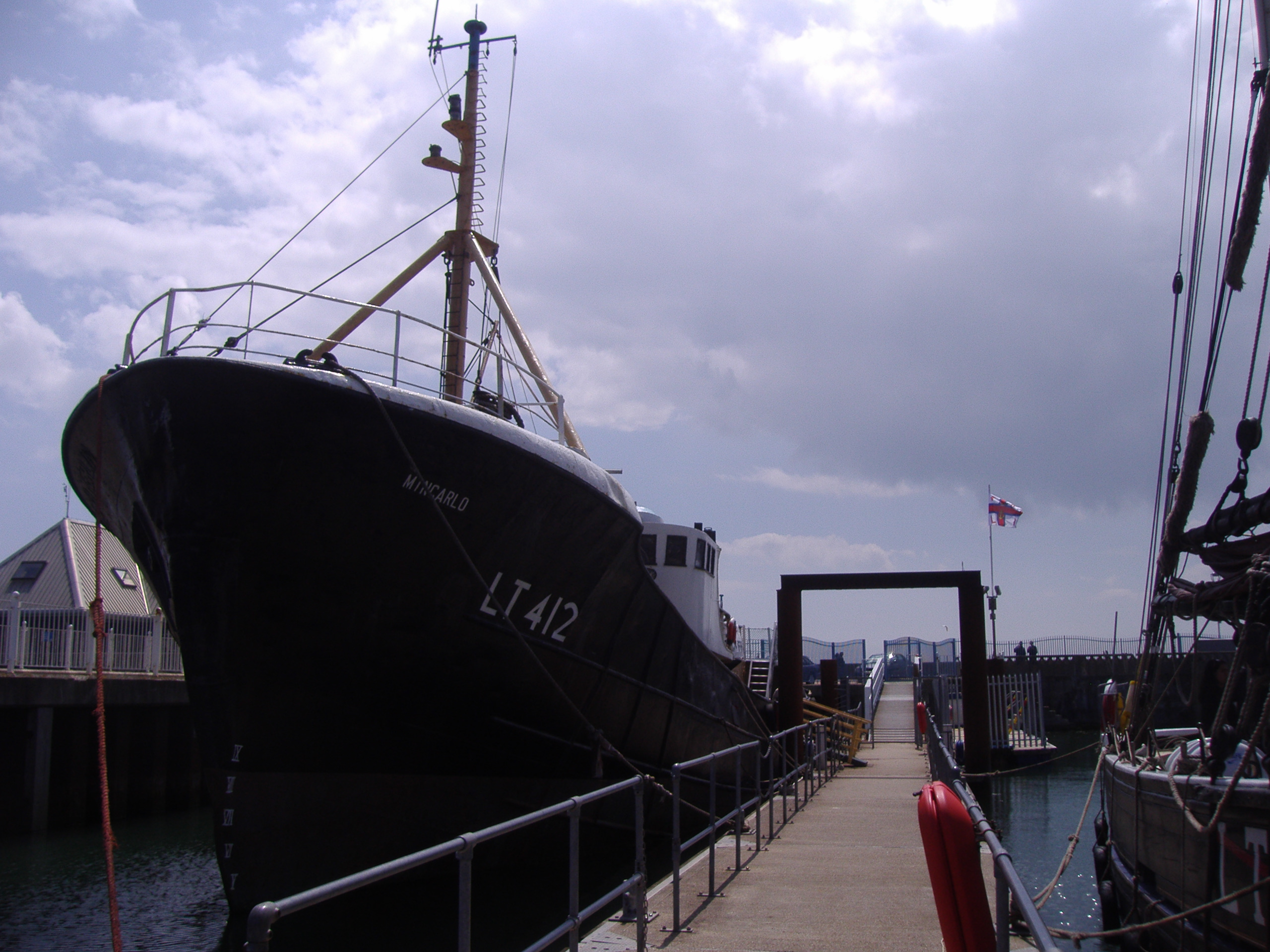
The bow

The working deck or foredeck

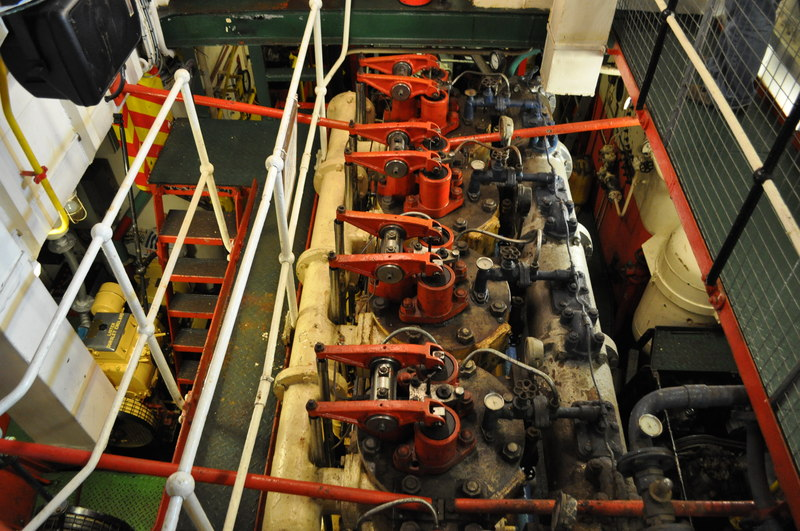
The engine

== See also ==
- Excelsior - last surviving Lowestoft fishing smack
