= Thomas Crisp =

Recipient of the Victoria Cross

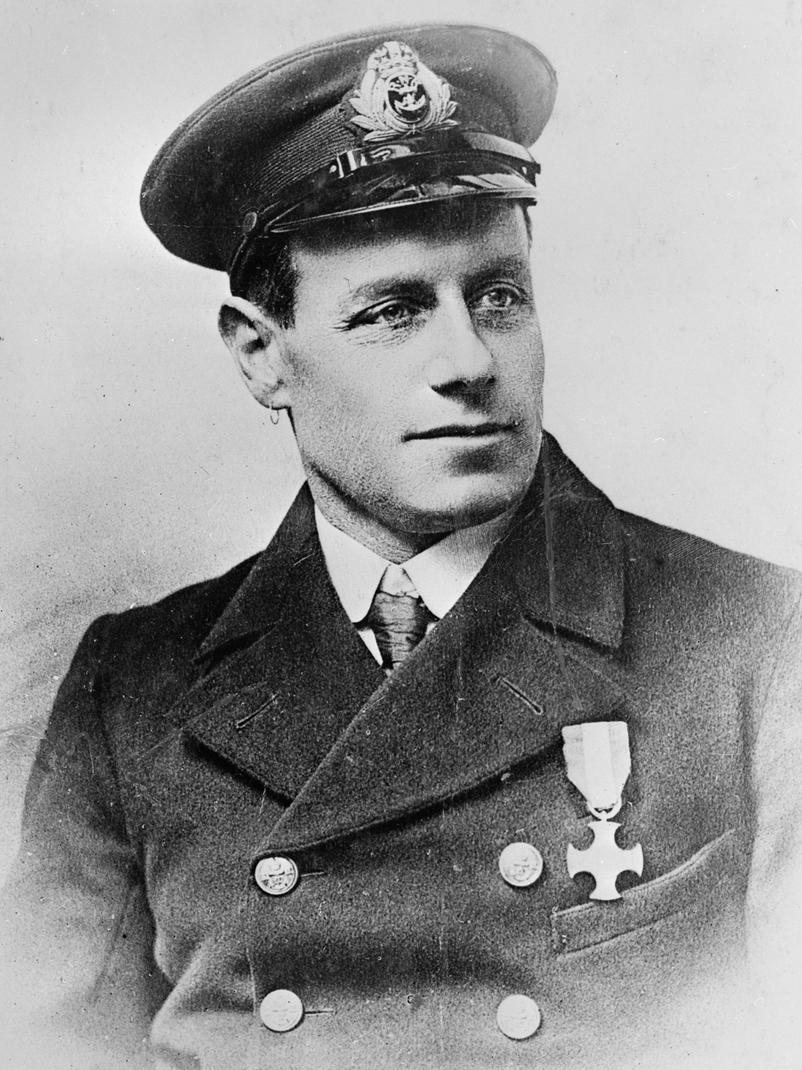
- Thomas Crisp, VC
- Born: 28 April 1876; Lowestoft, Suffolk, England
- Died: 15 August 1917 (aged 41); Naval smack Nelson, North Sea, off Humber Estuary, England
- Military career
- Allegiance: United Kingdom
- Branch: Royal Navy
- Service years: 1915–1917
- Rank: Skipper
- Units: Royal Naval Reserve
- Commands: HM Armed Smack Nelson
- Conflicts: First World War: Naval campaign; North Sea campaign; Action of 15 August 1917 (DOW)
- Awards: Victoria Cross; Distinguished Service Cross

Thomas Crisp VC, DSC, RNR (28 April 1876 – 15 August 1917) was an English sailor and posthumous recipient of the Victoria Cross. Crisp, in civilian life a commercial fisherman operating from Lowestoft in Suffolk, earned his award after being killed during the defence of his vessel, the armed naval smack Nelson, in the North Sea against an attack from a German submarine in 1917.

Crisp's self-sacrifice in the face of this "unequal struggle" was used by the government to bolster morale during some of the toughest days of the First World War for Britain, in late 1917, during which Britain was suffering heavy losses at the Battle of Passchendaele. His exploit was read aloud by David Lloyd George in the Houses of Parliament and made headline news for nearly a week.

== Early life ==
Thomas Crisp was born into a family of shipwrights and fishermen in Lowestoft, one of ten children to William and Mary Anne Crisp. Although his father was the owner of a successful boatbuilding firm and thus could afford an education for his children, Thomas did not enjoy school, instead showing a "marked preference for quayside adventure to school routine".

Leaving school, Thomas took to the sea, spending several years as a herring fisherman before joining a fishing trawler out of Lowestoft. He was a natural to the work, being a remarkably good sailor, but tired of it quickly and joined the Atlantic steamship SS Mobile, becoming her quartermaster and making several trans-Atlantic voyages.

Crisp with his family in about 1907

In 1895, aged 19, he met and married Harriet Elizabeth Alp and settled with her at 48 Staithe Road in Burgh St. Peter near Lowestoft, where they had two sons and a daughter, including Thomas Crisp Jr, who would be with his father on the day he won the Victoria Cross. Establishing himself as a fisherman, Thomas Sr achieved his mate and then skipper qualifications, entitling him to captain a fishing vessel sailing from the port. In 1902 he was taken on by Chambers, one of the largest boat owning families in Lowestoft, to crew and then captain their ketch George Borrow, in which he remained for thirteen years. In 1907 the family moved to Lowestoft while Crisp continued his work at sea, proving one of the most popular fishing captains in Lowestoft and joined on his ketch by his son in 1913.

When the First World War began in July 1914, Crisp was at sea. Unaware of the outbreak of war, he remained in the North Sea for several days, and was surprised on his return to learn that enemy submarines were expected off the port at any moment. When this threat failed to materialise, Thomas Crisp returned to fishing, considered too old for military service and in an occupation vital to Britain's food supplies. In late September, George Borrow passed HMS Aboukir, HMS Hogue and HMS Cressy shortly before they were all sunk, with over a thousand lives lost, by German U-boat U-9. Tom Crisp Jr. later wrote of finding bodies in their fishing nets for weeks afterwards.

== War service ==
In early 1915, Tom Crisp Jr left the vessel to join the Royal Navy. A few weeks later the U-boat threat expected so many months before arrived, as submarines surfaced among the undefended fishing fleets and used dynamite to destroy dozens of them after releasing the crews in small boats. This offensive was part of a wider German strategy to denude Britain of food supplies and took a heavy toll on the fishing fleets of the North Sea. George Borrow was among the victims, sunk in August, although it is not known if Tom Crisp (father) was aboard at the time. While temporarily working in a net factory following the loss of his vessel, he was scouted by a Navy officer recruiting experienced local fishing captains to command a flotilla of tiny fishing vessels, which were to be secretly armed. The boats were intended to be working fishing vessels fitted with a small artillery piece with which to sink enemy submarines as they surfaced alongside. In this manner it was hoped they would protect the fishing fleets without the diversion of major resources from the regular fleet, in the same manner as Q-ships deployed in the commercial sea lanes.

Agreeing to this proposal, Crisp became first a Seaman and by mid-1916 a Skipper in the Royal Naval Reserve, arranging for his son to join the crew of his boat, the HM Armed Smack I'll Try, armed with a 3-pounder gun. On 1 February 1917 in the North Sea, I'll Try had its first confrontation with the enemy when two submarines surfaced close to the smack and her companion the larger Boy Alfred. Despite near misses from enemy torpedoes, both smacks scored hits on their larger opponents and reported them as probable sinkings, although post-war German records show that no submarines were lost on that date. Both skippers were awarded the Distinguished Service Cross and a present of £200 for this action, and Crisp was offered a promotion and transfer to an ocean-going Q-ship. He was forced to turn down this offer due to his wife's sudden and terminal illness. She died in June 1917.

== Victoria Cross action ==
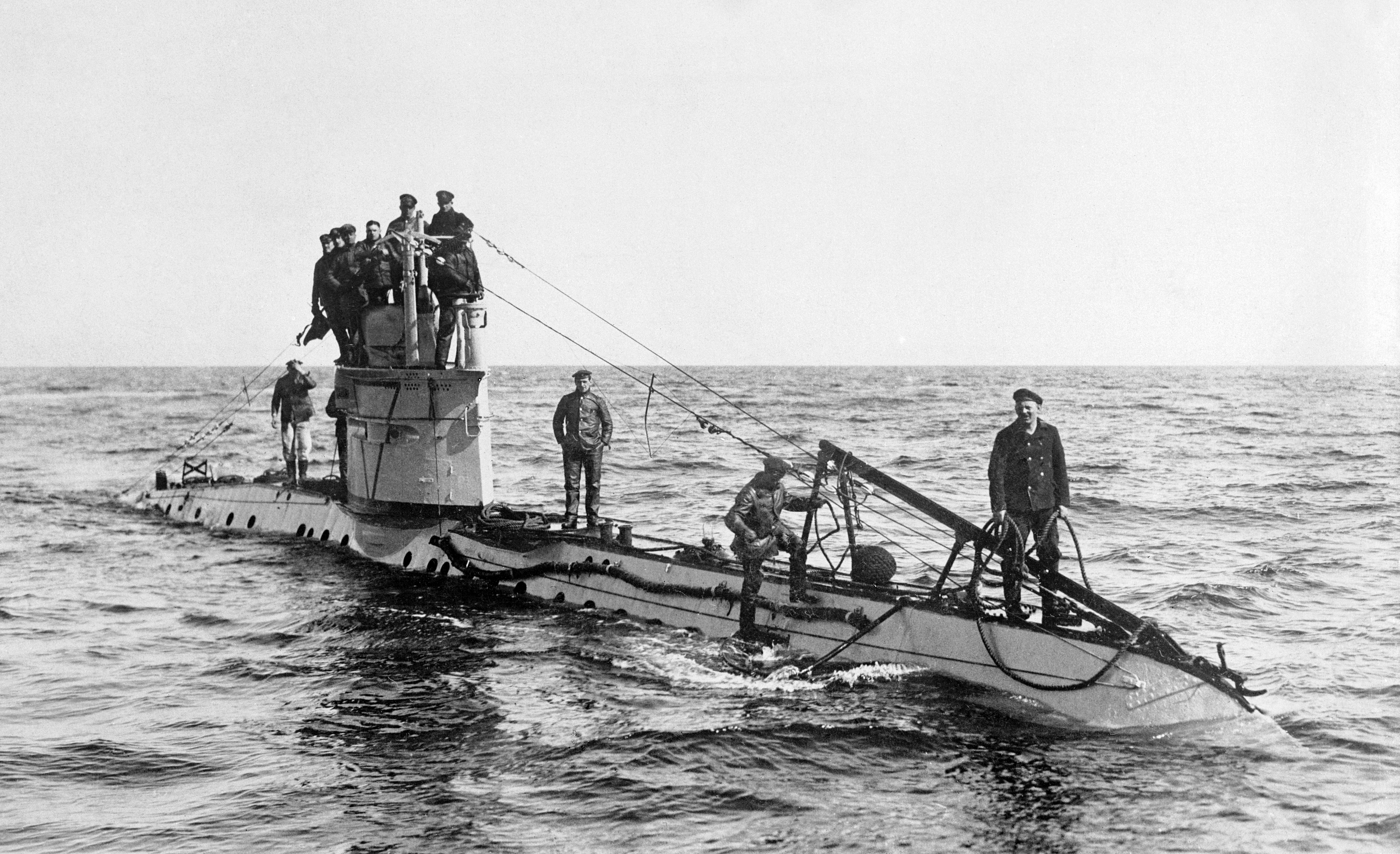
A UC-class coastal U-boat similar to the one that may have sunk Nelson

In July, I'll Try was renamed Nelson and Boy Alfred became Ethel & Millie, in an effort to maintain their cover. The boats continued to operate together and Crisp's crew was augmented with two regular seamen and a Royal Marine rifleman, providing Nelson with a crew of ten, including Crisp and his son. The smacks set out as usual on 15 August and pulled in a catch during the morning before making a sweep near the Jim Howe Bank in search of cruising enemies. At 2.30 pm, Crisp spotted a German U-boat on the surface 6,000 yards (5,500 m) away. The U-boat also sighted the smack and both vessels began firing at once, the U-boat's weapon scoring several hits before Nelson's could be brought to bear. By this stage in the war, German submarine captains were aware of the decoy ship tactics and no longer stopped British merchant shipping, preferring to sink them from a distance with gunfire.

With such a heavy disparity in armament between the smack's 3-pounder and the submarine's 88 mm deck gun the engagement was short lived, the submarine firing eight shots before the Nelson could get within range of her opponent. The fourth shot fired by the U-boat holed the smack, and the seventh tore off both of Crisp's legs from underneath him. Calling for the confidential papers to be thrown overboard, Crisp dictated a message to be sent by the boat's four carrier pigeons: like many small ships of the era, Nelson did not possess a radio set.

Nelson being attacked by submarine. Skipper killed. Jim Howe Bank. Send assistance at once.

The sinking smack was abandoned by the nine unwounded crew, who attempted to remove their captain, who ordered that he should be thrown overboard rather than slow them down. The crew refused to do so, but found they were unable to move him and left him where he lay. He died in his son's arms a few minutes later. It is said that he was smiling as he died and remained so as the ship sank underneath him. Ethel & Millie had just arrived on the scene as Nelson sank, and her captain Skipper Charles Manning called for Nelson's lifeboat to come alongside. Realising that this would greatly overcrowd the second boat, the survivors refused and Manning sailed onwards towards the submarine, coming under lethal fire as he did so. His vessel was soon badly damaged and began to sink.

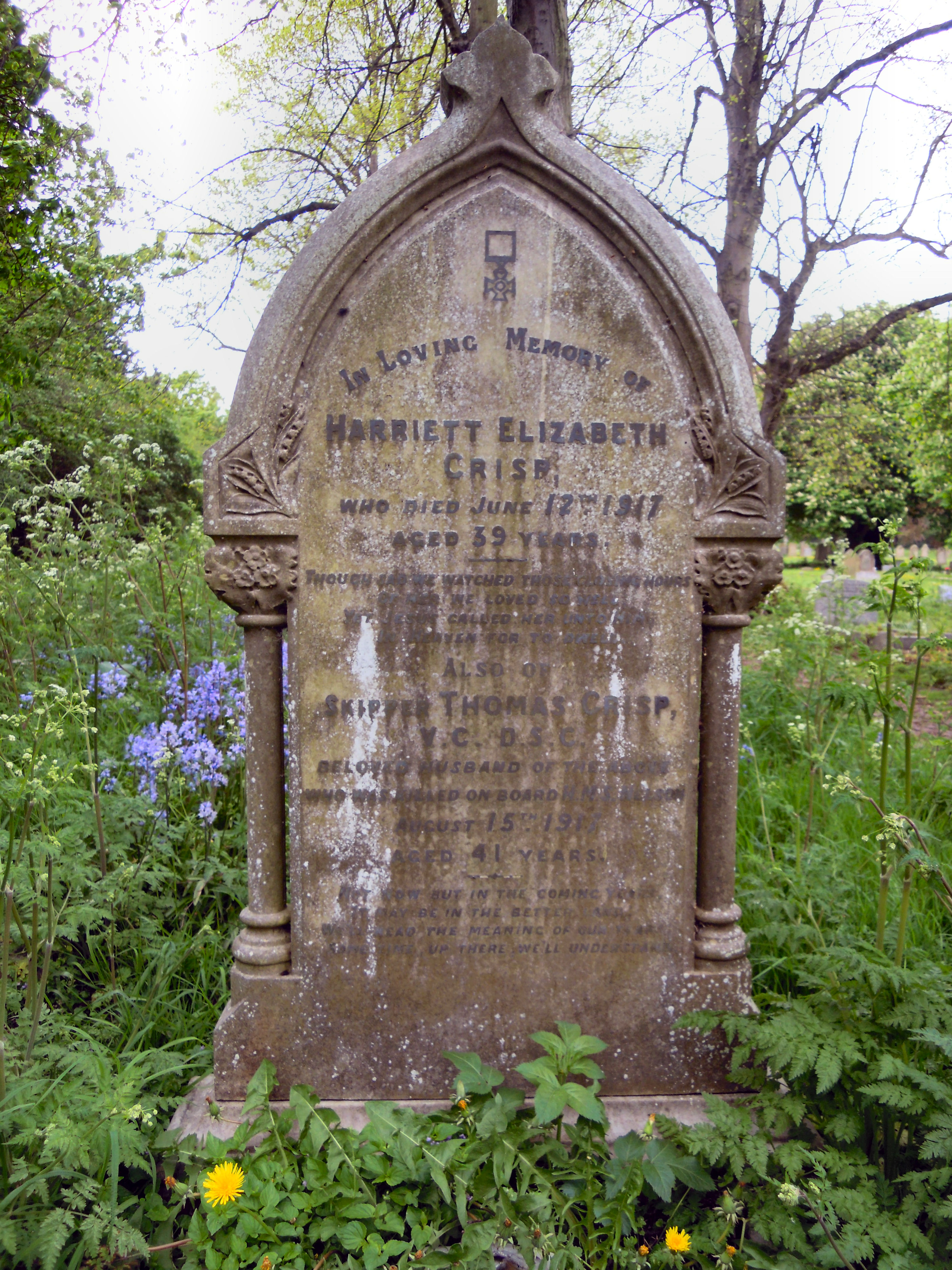
The cenotaph memorial for Thomas Crisp VC in Lowestoft Cemetery

The crew of Ethel & Millie then abandoned their battered boat and were hauled aboard the German submarine, where the Nelson survivors last saw them standing in line being addressed by a German officer. The seven British sailors of Ethel & Millie were never seen again, and much controversy exists surrounding their disappearance. Prevailing opinion at the time was that they were killed and dumped overboard by the German crew or abandoned at sea without supplies, as the German government had made it clear they regarded the crews of merchant ships who fought back against U-boat attacks as francs-tireurs, and thus liable to execution. These scenarios cannot be substantiated. Another theory is that they were taken prisoner and killed when the submarine was sunk. UC-63 has been named as the submarine that sank both vessels.

The survivors of Nelson drifted for nearly two days until they arrived at the Jim Howe Buoy, where they were rescued by the fishery protection vessel Dryad. A pigeon named "Red Cock" had reached the authorities in Lowestoft with news of the fate of the boats and caused the Dryad to be despatched to search for survivors.

A court of enquiry praised the surviving crew and their dead captain and authorised the award of the Victoria Cross posthumously to Thomas Crisp and Distinguished Service Medals to his son and another member of the crew. On 29 October 1917, David Lloyd George made an emotional speech in the House of Commons citing Crisp's sacrifice as representative of the Royal Navy's commitment "from the icy waters of the Arctic Ocean to the stormy floods of Magellan", which promoted Crisp into an overnight celebrity whose story ran in all the major London papers for nearly a week, containing as it did a story of personal sacrifice, filial devotion and perceived German barbarity. The medal presentation was made to Tom Crisp Jr at Buckingham Palace on 19 December 1917. Crisp is memorialised on his wife's gravestone in Lowestoft Cemetery.

=== Citations ===
Admiralty, 2nd November, 1917
HONOURS FOR SERVICES IN ACTION WITH ENEMY SUBMARINES

The KING has been graciously pleased to approve of the award of the following honours, decorations and medals to officer and men for services in action with enemy submarines: —

Posthumous Award of the Victoria Cross.

Skipper Thomas Crisp, R.N.R., 10055D.A.

(Killed in action).

The London Gazette, 30 October 1917

Action of H.M. Armed Smack "Nelson" on the 15th August, 1917.

On the 15th August, 1917, the Smack "Nelson" was engaged in fishing when she was attacked with gunfire from an enemy submarine. The gear was let go and the submarine's fire was returned. The submarine's fourth shot went through the port bow just below the water line and the seventh shell struck the skipper, partially disembowelling him, and passed through the deck and out through the side of the ship. In spite of the terrible nature of his wound Skipper Crisp retained consciousness, and his first thought was to send off a message that he was being attacked and giving his position. He continued to command his ship until the ammunition was almost exhausted and the smack was sinking. He refused to be moved into the small boat when the rest of the crew were obliged to abandon the vessel as she sank, his last request being that he might be thrown overboard.

(The posthumous award of the Victoria Cross to Skipper Thomas Crisp, D.S.C., R.N.R., 10055 D.A., was announced in London Gazette No. 30363, dated 2 November 1917).

The London Gazette, 20 November 1918

== Post-war remembrance ==
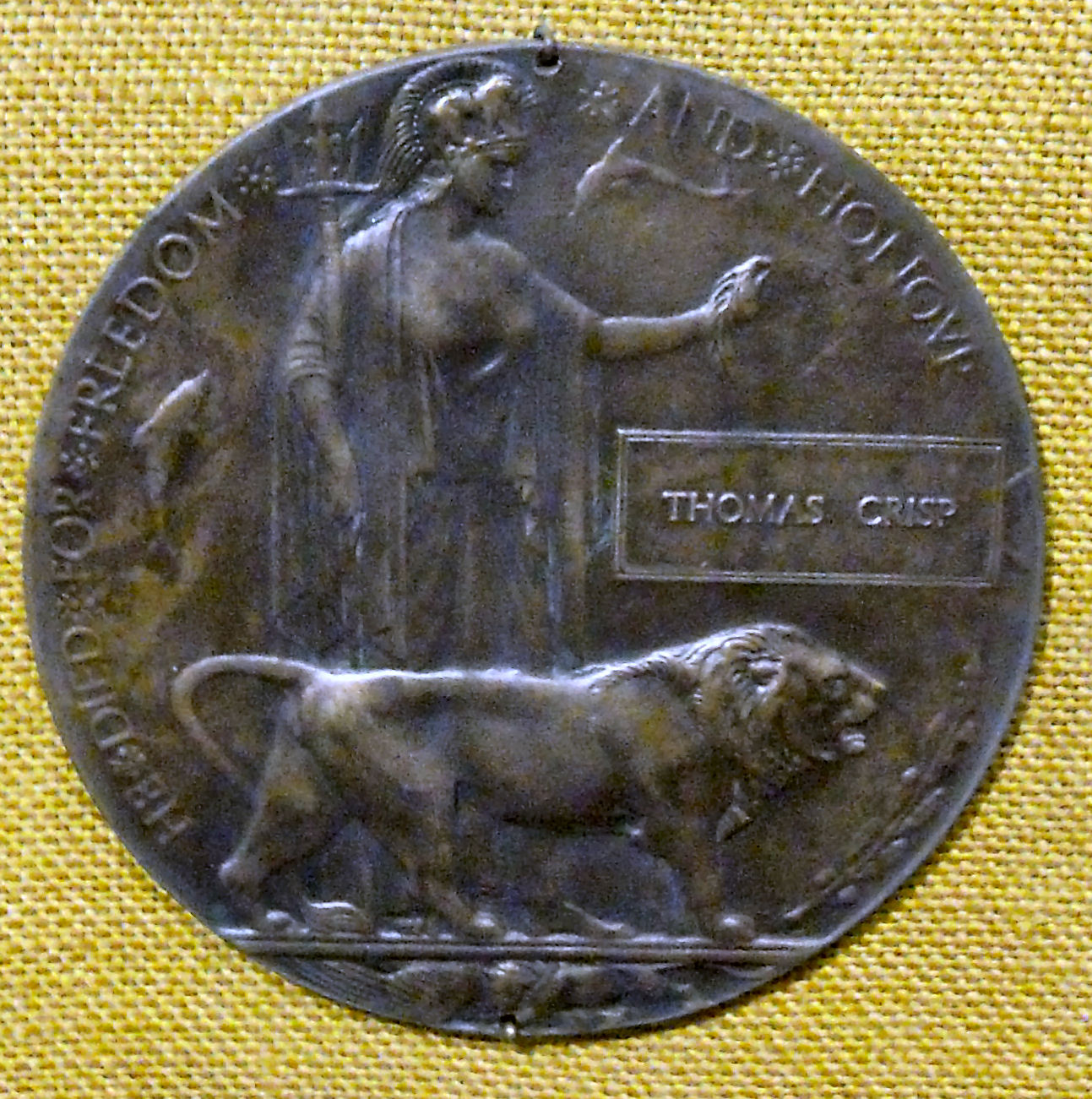
Memorial Plaque to Crisp displayed at Lowestoft Maritime Museum

After the war, a small display in memory of Crisp was set up in Lowestoft Free Library and another in Lowestoft Maritime Museum. The former contained a specially commissioned painting and parts of the sunken Nelson, which were dredged up years later. This display was destroyed during the Second World War when the building was gutted in the Blitz. A new display featuring a replica of the Victoria Cross awarded to Crisp currently stands in Lowestoft Town Hall. The original is held securely by the local council after Crisp's family felt his interests would not be served if the medal were held privately. It can be viewed on request.

Crisp's name is inscribed on the Chatham Naval Memorial for those lost at sea during the First World War, as well as two church memorials in Lowestoft to the town's war dead, St. John's and St. Margaret's. The latter church also contains a "VC Bell" dedicated to his memory. Tom Crisp Way, a street in his native Lowestoft, is named in his honour.

In a footnote to the action, the pigeon "Red Cock", which brought news of the engagement to the authorities, was stuffed upon his death and was mounted in the Thomas Crisp display at Lowestoft Town Hall for many years before being reportedly relocated to a museum in South Kensington.
