= HMS E52 =

Submarine of the Royal Navy

History

United Kingdom
- Name: E52
- Builder: William Denny, Dumbarton
- Yard number: 1048
- Launched: 25 January 1917
- Commissioned: 13 March 1917
- Fate: Sold, 3 January 1921

General characteristics
- Class & type: E-class submarine
- Displacement: 662 long tons (673 t) surfaced; 807 long tons (820 t) submerged
- Length: 181 ft (55 m)
- Beam: 15 ft (4.6 m)
- Propulsion: 2 × 800 hp (597 kW) diesel; 2 × 420 hp (313 kW) electric; 2 screw propellers
- Speed: 15 knots (28 km/h; 17 mph) surfaced; 10 knots (19 km/h; 12 mph) submerged
- Range: 3,000 nmi (5,600 km) at 10 kn (19 km/h; 12 mph) surfaced; 65 nmi (120 km) at 5 kn (9.3 km/h; 5.8 mph) surfaced
- Complement: 31
- Armament: 5 × 18 inch (450 mm) torpedo tubes (2 bow, 2 beam, 1 stern); 1 × 12-pounder gun

HMS E52 was a British E-class submarine built by William Denny and Brothers, Dumbarton, entering service in 1917. She sank the U-boat UC-63 near the Goodwin Sands on 1 November 1917. E52 was sold in 1921 and later hulked on the River Dart.

== Design ==
Like all post-E8 British E-class submarines, E52 had a displacement of 662 long tons (673 t) at the surface and 807 long tons (820 t) while submerged. She had a total length of 180 feet (55 m) and a beam of 22 feet 8.5 inches (6.922 m). She was powered by two 800 horsepower (600 kW) Ruston & Proctor eight-cylinder two-stroke diesel engines and two 420 horsepower (310 kW) electric motors. The submarine had a maximum surface speed of 16 knots (30 km/h; 18 mph) and a submerged speed of 10 knots (19 km/h; 12 mph). British E-class submarines had fuel capacities of 50 long tons (51 t) of diesel and ranges of 3,255 miles (5,238 km; 2,829 nmi) when travelling at 10 knots (19 km/h; 12 mph). E52 was capable of operating submerged for five hours when travelling at 5 knots (9.3 km/h; 5.8 mph).

E52 was armed with a 12-pounder 76 mm (3.0 in) QF gun mounted forward of the conning tower. She had five 18 inch (450 mm) torpedo tubes, two in the bow, one either side amidships, and one in the stern; a total of 10 torpedoes were carried.

E-Class submarines had wireless systems with 1 kilowatt (1.3 hp) power ratings; in some submarines, these were later upgraded to 3 kilowatts (4.0 hp) systems by removing a midship torpedo tube. Their maximum design depth was 100 feet (30 m) although in service some reached depths of below 200 feet (61 m). Some submarines contained Fessenden oscillator systems.

== Construction ==
E52 was ordered from Yarrow Shipbuilders, Scotstoun but transferred on 3 March 1915 to William Denny and Brothers, Dumbarton as Yard No.1048. She was launched on 25 January 1917 and delivered on 13 March.

== Service ==
On 31 October 1917, E52 left her depot ship HMS Arrogant to patrol in the English Channel. Just after midnight she surprised the German U-boat UC-63 on the surface near the Goodwin Sands, in the southern North Sea, returning to Zeebrugge after laying mines. E52 attacked UC-63 in 51°23′N 2°00′E, with torpedoes, and the German submarine sank with the loss of all-but-one of her 27 crew. As a result of this encounter, Lt. Cdr. Philip Esmonde Phillips of E52 was awarded the Distinguished Service Order for "services in action with enemy submarines".

== Fate ==
E52 was sold on 3 January 1921 to Brixham Marine & Engineering Company. The submarine was stripped and taken to the River Dart and lay on the shore with other vessels, below the Britannia Royal Naval College. They were believed to have been utilised to strengthen a bank in Coombe Mud, and then buried in the land reclamation to create Coronation Park. A team from the University of Winchester is investigating the site in April 2023, using ground-penetrating radar. In June 2023, it was announced that the team had found remains of what they believed was E52 and the German torpedo boat S24.

== Bibliography ==
- Hutchinson, Robert (2001). Jane's Submarines: War Beneath the Waves from 1776 to the Present Day. London: HarperCollins. ISBN 978-0-00-710558-8. OCLC 53783010.
