= Armed trawler Nelson =

History

United Kingdom
- Name: Nelson
- Launched: 1905
- In service: 1915–1917
- Fate: Sunk 15 August 1917
- Notes: Converted to armed merchantman at Lowestoft

General characteristics
- Type: Armed smack
- Tonnage: 61 GRT
- Propulsion: sail
- Armament: 1 × 3 pounder naval gun

Armed trawler Nelson was a British auxiliary warship which served during World War I. She was built in 1905 as the fishing smack G&E, operating from Lowestoft and registered as LT 649. In 1915 she was armed for defence against U-boat attack, and fought several actions against them. She was sunk in action on 15 August 1917. This action was fought between a German U-boat (believed to be SM UC-63) and two trawlers, Nelson and Ethel & Millie, off the English coast.

== Background ==
G&E was a dandy-rigged smack of 49 net registered tons, built at Porthleven, Cornwall in 1905 and registered at Lowestoft. She was built for Frederick Moxey of Lowestoft and was registered there as LT 649, operating in the North Sea fishing grounds.

In 1915, as part of the Imperial German Navy's U-boat campaign of unrestricted submarine warfare German U-boats had started to attack British trawlers (which had previously been protected by the 1907 Naval Convention) in the North Sea. In response to this, fishermen had requested weapons for self defence. G&E was one of these vessels, being equipped with a 3-pounder gun and assigned a naval rating as gunner. In this manner she entered service in August 1915.

== Service history ==
G&E's first action came on 11 August 1915, just three days after entering service as an auxiliary. While engaged in fishing off the Suffolk coast G&E was attacked by a German U-boat, later identified as SM UB-6. The U-boat approached G&E, intending to sink her by boarding and placing bombs (the early UB boats had no deck gun, and their commanders would not want to waste a torpedo on such a small target; sinking fishing boats in this way was the usual method used); when she was in range, G&E opened fire with her deck gun, scoring several hits on the conning tower. The U-boat quickly crash-dived, and G&E's crew assumed they had sunk her, as did the Admiralty, who credited G&E with a successful "kill". However UB-6 was able to return to base; the damage to the conning tower was not fatal, as it was not part of the pressure hull, but merely a superstructure.

With the end of the first period of unrestricted submarine warfare, in September 1915, G&E returned to civilian duty. However, in February 1917, with its reintroduction, G&E, now under the name I'll Try, and under the command of skipper Tom Crisp, was taken up again as an auxiliary.

On 1 February 1917, in company with another armed smack, Boy Alfred, commanded by skipper Wharton, the boats were approached by two U-boats closing in on the surface. One of the U-boats, which were not identified, closed in on Boy Alfred and ordered her crew to abandon ship. As it was in range Wharton opened fire and the U-boat sank from view ("and that was the end of that sub"). The other submerged and for the next two hours played a cat and mouse game with I'll Try. The U-boat closed in at periscope depth and sought a favourable firing position for a torpedo attack, but I'll Try was able to manoeuvre to avoid this by turning towards the periscope and forcing the U-boat to go deep. After two hours Crisp turned away, attempting to draw the U-boat to the surface; there was no sign of it, so he turned back to search. Then the U-boat surfaced 150 yards (140 m) from I'll Try and turned to close, firing a single torpedo which just missed I'll Try's stern. Crisp opened fire, and scored hits on the U-boats conning tower, which was awash. She went down head first, showing her stern out of water and leaving the sea covered in oil. On the basis of this it was judged that both U-boats had been destroyed, and skippers Wharton and Crisp were awarded the Distinguished Service Cross and an Admiralty bounty, but post war examination of records showed no U-boats sunk that day.

== Fate ==
On 15 August I'll Try, now sailing under the name Nelson but still commanded by Crisp, was trawling off the Humber. She was again in the company of Boy Alfred, now named Ethel & Millie and under command of "Johnsey" Manning. In the afternoon of the 15th Nelson was attacked by a U-boat, believed to be SM UC-63, which fired on her at long range. Nelson attempted to close, but was crippled by gunfire and left sinking. Crisp was mortally wounded and gave the order to abandon ship, remaining on board as the crew did so, and going down with her as she sank. Ethel & Millie was also sunk in this action and her crew lost. Nelson's crew survived, spending two days in their lifeboat before they were picked up by HMS Dryad. Crisp was awarded a posthumous Victoria Cross for his "seamanlike and brave manner".
