= SM UC-63 =

German submarine

History

German Empire
- Name: UC-63
- Ordered: 12 January 1916
- Builder: AG Weser, Bremen
- Yard number: 261
- Laid down: 3 April 1916
- Launched: 6 January 1917
- Commissioned: 30 January 1917
- Fate: Torpedoed and sunk on 1 November 1917

General characteristics
- Class & type: Type UC II submarine
- Displacement: 422 t (415 long tons), surfaced; 504 t (496 long tons), submerged
- Length: 51.85 m (170 ft 1 in) o/a; 40.30 m (132 ft 3 in) pressure hull
- Beam: 5.22 m (17 ft 2 in) o/a; 3.65 m (12 ft) pressure hull
- Draught: 3.67 m (12 ft 0 in)
- Propulsion: 2 × propeller shafts; 2 × 6-cylinder, 4-stroke diesel engines, 600 PS (440 kW; 590 shp); 2 × electric motors, 620 PS (460 kW; 610 shp)
- Speed: 11.9 knots (22.0 km/h; 13.7 mph), surfaced; 7.2 knots (13.3 km/h; 8.3 mph), submerged
- Range: 8,000 nmi (15,000 km; 9,200 mi) at 7 knots (13 km/h; 8.1 mph) surfaced; 59 nmi (109 km; 68 mi) at 4 knots (7.4 km/h; 4.6 mph) submerged
- Test depth: 50 m (160 ft)
- Complement: 26
- Armament: 6 × 100 cm (39.4 in) mine tubes; 18 × UC 200 mines; 3 × 50 cm (19.7 in) torpedo tubes (2 bow/external; one stern); 7 × torpedoes; 1 × 8.8 cm (3.5 in) Uk L/30 deck gun
- Notes: 30-second diving time

Service record
- Part of: Flandern Flotilla; 27 April – 1 November 1917
- Commanders: Oblt.z.S. Karsten von Heydebreck; 30 January – 1 November 1917
- Operations: 9 patrols
- Victories: 33 merchant ships sunk (35,526 GRT); 3 auxiliary warships sunk (374 GRT); 4 merchant ships damaged (4,639 GRT)

SM UC-63 was a German Type UC II minelaying submarine or U-boat in the German Imperial Navy (German: Kaiserliche Marine) during World War I. The U-boat was ordered on 12 January 1916, laid down on 3 April 1916, and was launched on 6 January 1917. She was commissioned into the German Imperial Navy on 30 January 1917 as SM UC-63. (Note: "SM" stands for Seiner Majestäts (English: His Majesty's) and combined with "U" for Unterseeboot translates as "His Majesty's Submarine".) In nine patrols UC-63 was credited with sinking 36 ships, either by torpedo or by mines laid. UC-63 was torpedoed and sunk by HMS E52 off Goodwin Sands on 1 November 1917; only one crewman survived the sinking.

== Design ==
A Type UC II submarine, UC-63 had a displacement of 422 tonnes (415 long tons) when at the surface and 504 tonnes (496 long tons) while submerged. She had a length overall of 51.85 m (170 ft 1 in), a beam of 5.22 m (17 ft 2 in), and a draught of 3.67 m (12 ft 0 in). The submarine was powered by two six-cylinder four-stroke diesel engines each producing 300 metric horsepower (220 kW; 300 shp) (a total of 1,000 metric horsepower (740 kW; 990 shp)), two electric motors producing 620 metric horsepower (460 kW; 610 shp), and two propeller shafts. She had a dive time of 48 seconds and was capable of operating at a depth of 50 metres (160 ft).

The submarine had a maximum surface speed of 11.9 knots (22.0 km/h; 13.7 mph) and a submerged speed of 7.2 knots (13.3 km/h; 8.3 mph). When submerged, she could operate for 59 nautical miles (109 km; 68 mi) at 4 knots (7.4 km/h; 4.6 mph); when surfaced, she could travel 8,000 nautical miles (15,000 km; 9,200 mi) at 7 knots (13 km/h; 8.1 mph). UC-63 was fitted with six 100 centimetres (39 in) mine tubes, eighteen UC 200 mines, three 50 centimetres (20 in) torpedo tubes (one on the stern and two on the bow), seven torpedoes, and one 8.8 cm (3.5 in) Uk L/30 deck gun. Her complement was twenty-six crew members.

== Service career ==
UC-63 entered service on 30 January 1917, under the command of Oblt Karsten von Heydebreck. She was assigned to the Flanders U-boat Flotilla, based at Bruges in occupied Belgium.

UC-63 carried out nine war patrols, operating mainly in the North Sea against British fishing trawlers. She had considerable success, sinking seven and damaging two more in a single day in June 1917. In August 1917 she fought an action against two armed trawlers, HMS Nelson and HMS Boy Alfred. Both of these were sunk, and the crew of Ethel & Millie were picked up by the U-boat, after which they were not seen again. The suspicion then, and subsequently, is that they were disposed of by the U-boat commander, perhaps by being left to drown while the U-boat submerged. The German government had made it clear they regarded the crews of merchant ships who fought back against U-boat attacks as francs-tireurs, and thus liable to execution.

Before her loss in November 1917, UC-63 sank 36 ships, totalling 35,900 GRT, and damaged four more, in a nine month career.

== Fate ==
On 1 November 1917, while operating off the Goodwin Sands, UC-63 was sighted by British submarine HMS E52. She was torpedoed and sunk with the loss of all but one of her 27 crew.

== Summary of raiding history ==
Date	Name	Nationality	Tonnage (Note: Merchant ship tonnages are in gross register tons. Military vessels are listed by tons displacement.)	Fate
26 April 1917	Amsteldjik	Netherlands	186	Sunk
10 May 1917	Gruno	Netherlands	171	Sunk
27 June 1917	Longbenton	United Kingdom	924	Sunk
28 June 1917	Frigate Bird	United Kingdom	20	Sunk
28 June 1917	Elsie	United Kingdom	20	Sunk
28 June 1917	Frances	United Kingdom	20	Sunk
28 June 1917	Glenelg	United Kingdom	32	Sunk
28 June 1917	Harbinger	United Kingdom	39	Sunk
28 June 1917	Rose of June	United Kingdom	20	Sunk
28 June 1917	William And Betsy	United Kingdom	21	Sunk
28 June 1917	Frank	United Kingdom	21	Damaged
28 June 1917	Diligence	United Kingdom	20	Damaged
30 June 1917	Markersdal	Denmark	1,640	Sunk
1 July 1917	Advance	United Kingdom	44	Sunk
1 July 1917	Gleam	United Kingdom	54	Sunk
1 July 1917	Radiance	United Kingdom	57	Sunk
31 July 1917	Empress	United Kingdom	2,914	Sunk
2 August 1917	Young Bert	United Kingdom	59	Sunk
6 August 1917	Alfred	France	107	Sunk
6 August 1917	Fane	Norway	1,119	Sunk
6 August 1917	Zamora	United Kingdom	3,639	Damaged
7 August 1917	Onesta	Kingdom of Italy	2,674	Sunk
8 August 1917	Marie Jesus Protegez Nous	France	46	Sunk
14 August 1917	Thames	United Kingdom	403	Sunk
14 August 1917	Costanza	Kingdom of Italy	2,545	Sunk
14 August 1917	Luna	Norway	959	Damaged
15 August 1917	HMS Ethel And Millie (as HMS Boy Alfred)	Royal Navy	58	Sunk
15 August 1917	HMS G & E (as HMS Nelson)	Royal Navy	61	Sunk
15 August 1917	Alice	United Kingdom	25	Sunk
22 September 1917	Italia	France	627	Sunk
24 September 1917	Perseverance	France	2,873	Sunk
24 September 1917	Europe	France	2,839	Sunk
25 September 1917	Dinorah	France	4,208	Sunk
25 September 1917	HMT James Seckar	Royal Navy	255	Sunk
24 October 1917	Ulfsborg	Denmark	2,040	Sunk
28 October 1917	Baron Garioch	United Kingdom	1,831	Sunk
29 October 1917	Marne	France	979	Sunk
4 November 1917	Lyra	Norway	1,141	Sunk
25 November 1917	Oriflamme	United Kingdom	3,764	Sunk
4 December 1917	Brigitta	United Kingdom	2,084	Sunk
