= Geldeston =

Village in Norfolk, England

Coordinates: 52.46827°N 1.51842°E

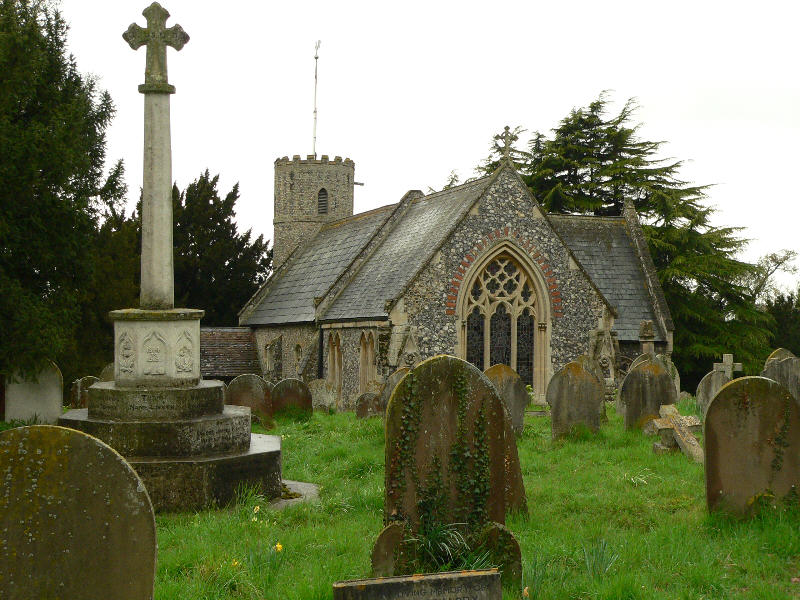
- St Michael's Church

- Location within Norfolk
- Area: 1.31 sq mi (3.4 km^{2})
- Population: 407 (2021 census)
  - Density: 311/sq mi (120/km^{2})
- OS grid reference: TM390914
  - London: 96 miles (154 km)
- Civil parish: Geldeston
- District: South Norfolk
- Shire county: Norfolk
- Region: East
- Country: England
- Sovereign state: United Kingdom
- Post town: BECCLES
- Postcode district: NR34
- Dialling code: 01508
- Police: Norfolk
- Fire: Norfolk
- Ambulance: East of England
- UK Parliament: Waveney Valley

Geldeston is a village and civil parish in the English county of Norfolk.

Geldeston is located 2.5 miles (4.0 km) north-west of Beccles and 14 miles (23 km) south-east of Norwich, on the north bank of the River Waveney.

== History ==
Geldeston's name is of Anglo-Saxon origin and derives from the Old English for Gyldi's farmstead or settlement.

Geldeston is not listed in the Domesday Book.

Geldeston is home to a crinkle crankle wall (located close to the village green), which are found most commonly in Suffolk.

In 1777, Geldeston Hall was built as the home of the Kerrich family and it remained in the same family until 1930. Today, the hall is divided into several separate dwellings.

== Geography ==
According to the 2021 census, Geldeston has a total population of 407 people which demonstrates an increase from the 397 people listed in the 2011 census.

Geldeston is located along the course of the River Waveney.

== St. Michael's Church ==
Geldeston's parish church is dedicated to Saint Michael and is one of Norfolk's 124 remaining round-tower churches, dating from the Twelfth Century. St. Michael's is located outside of the village on Yarmouth Road and has been Grade II listed since 1960. St. Michael's holds monthly Sunday services and is part of the Waveney Marshlands Benefice.

St. Michael's was significantly remodelled in the mid-Nineteenth Century based on the designs of Thomas Penrice and J. L. Clemence, with stained-glass depicting the Risen Christ installed by Leonard Walker in the mid-Twentieth Century.

== Amenities ==
The village hall was originally opened in 1924. It underwent significant renovation from 2016 onwards and is now a registered charity.

== Notable residents ==
- Dorothy Hodgkin OM- (1910-1994) chemist and Nobel Prize winner, lived in Geldeston.

== Governance ==
Geldeston is part of the electoral ward of Ditchingham & Earsham for local elections and is part of the district of South Norfolk.

The village's national constituency is Waveney Valley which has been represented by the Green Party's Adrian Ramsay since 2024.

== War Memorial ==
Geldeston War Memorial is an elaborate octagonal cross with a large plinth emblazoned with various regimental crests. The memorial lists the following names for the First World War:

Rank	Name	Unit	Date of death	Burial/Commemoration
LtCdr.	Henry Gartside-Tipping	HMY Sandra	25 Sep. 1915	Nieuport Memorial
Capt.	Henry L. Kerrich	3rd Bn., Sherwood Foresters	27 Sep. 1917	Wieltje Farm Cemetery
FLt.	Robert C. Packe (Note: FLt. Packe was killed when his Sopwith Camel ditched into the North Sea after taking off from Great Yarmouth. Packe had split his childhood between Geldeston Hall and Sulivan House, Port Stanley, Falklands Islands.)	Royal Air Force	21 Jun. 1918	Hollybrook Memorial
CfEn.	William Plummer	H.M. Drifter County of Nairn	4 Dec. 1918	St. Michael's Churchyard
Sgt.	Victor J. Bellward	8th Bn., Suffolk Regiment	10 Aug. 1917	St. Michael's Churchyard
Pte.	Albert Thrower	33rd Coy., Machine Gun Corps	8 Nov. 1916	Boulogne South Cemetery
Pte.	Albert J. Kemp	4th Bn., Norfolk Regiment	27 Mar. 1917	Gaza War Cemetery
Rfn.	Alfred Hilling	1st Bn., Royal Irish Rifles	2 Oct. 1918	Dadizele Cemetery
Spr.	John Gaff	206 Coy., Royal Engineers	27 Aug. 1916	Cambrin Churchyard

The following names were added after the Second World War:

Rank	Name	Unit	Date of death	Burial/Commemoration
FLt.	Anthony G. Clark	No. 137 (Fighter) Squadron RAF	30 Oct. 1941	St. Michael's Churchyard
LSgt.	Stanley Cook	1st Bn., Royal Norfolk Regiment	14 Oct. 1944	Overloon Cemetery
LCpl.	Ernest A. Blaza	8th Bn., Manchester Regiment	7 Jul. 1944	Arezzo War Cemetery
Pte.	George Somerville	2nd Bn., Royal Sussex Regiment	30 May 1940	St. Michael's Churchyard
Smn.	Frank Gower	H.M. Trawler Myrtle	14 Jun. 1940	Lowestoft Memorial
