= Geldeston Meadows =

UK Site of Special Scientific Interest

Coordinates: 52.470°N 1.526°E

- Site of Special Scientific Interest
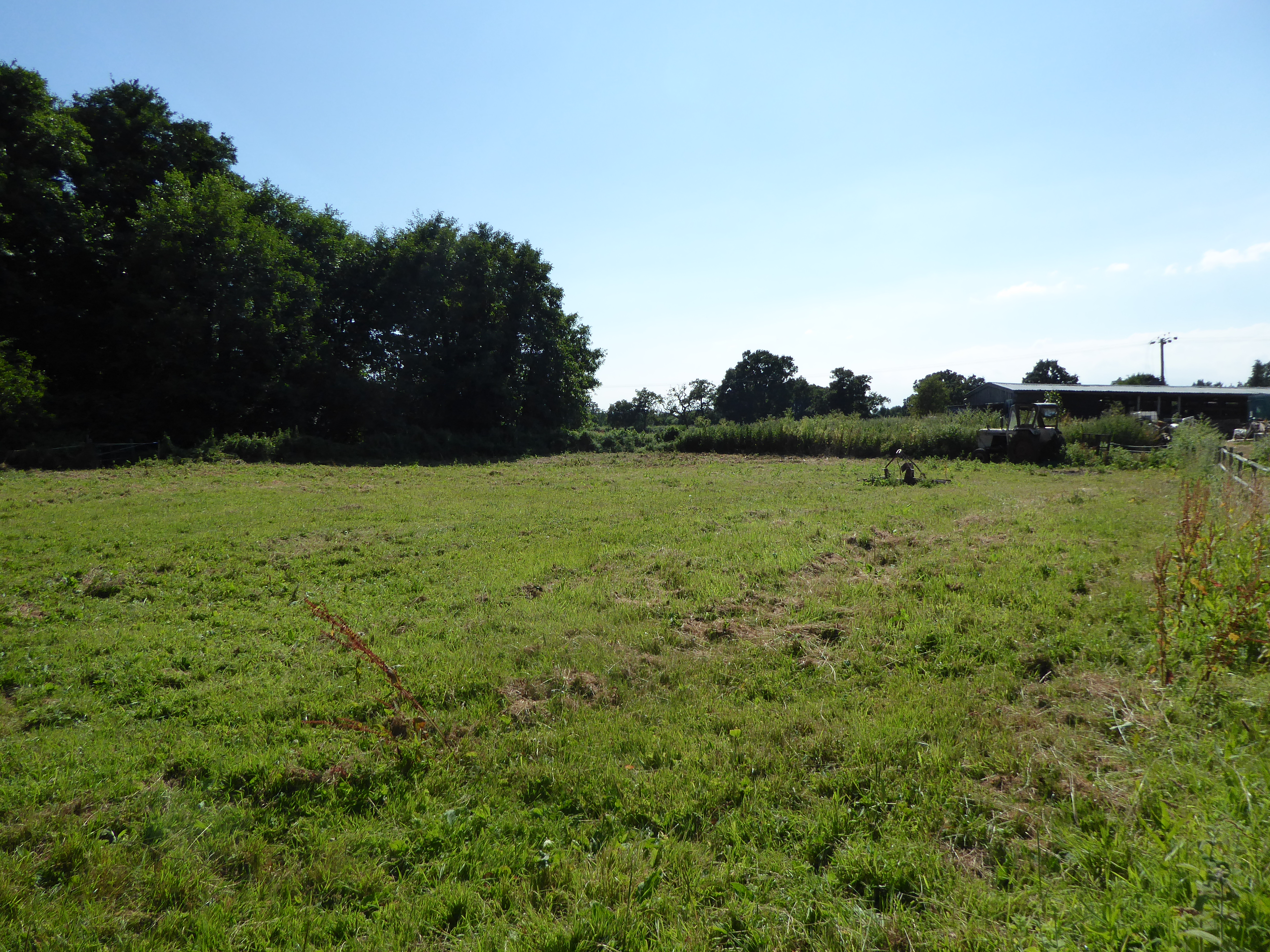
- Location of Geldeston Meadows.
- Area of search: Norfolk
- Grid reference: TM 396 916
- Interest: Biological
- Area: 14.0 hectares (35 acres)
- Notification date: 1988
- Location map: Magic Map

Geldeston Meadows is a 14-hectare (35-acre) biological Site of Special Scientific Interest near Geldeston in Norfolk, England. It is part of the Broadland Ramsar site and Special Protection Area, and The Broads Special Area of Conservation.

These traditionally managed meadows in the flood plain of the River Waveney have a very diverse flora. Most of the site is wet grassland which is dominated by sweet vernal grass, common quaking grass and crested dog's-tail.

The site is private land with no public access.
