= George Miles =

George Miles may refer to:

- George Miles (organist) (1913–1988), English organist and organ teacher
- George Henry Miles (1824–1871), American writer
- George Miles (politician) (1873–1952), Australian politician
- George Miles (Michigan jurist) (1789–1850), American jurist
- George Herbert Miles, brother of Frederick George Miles of Miles Aircraft Ltd.
