= Valentine Armitage =

British Army officer and schoolmaster

Valentine Armitage MC TD
- Photographic portrait of Armitage
- Born: 1888; Heidelberg, Germany
- Died: 1964 (aged 75–76)
- Education: Balliol College, Oxford
- Occupations: British Army officer and schoolmaster
- Spouse: Venetia Mary Stanley Errington Savile
- Parent(s): Allan Armitage, Margaret Drake

Lieutenant-Colonel Valentine Leathley Armitage MC TD (1888–1964) was a British Army officer and schoolmaster. He was the headmaster of Bloxham School from 1925 and 1940, where he introduced a number of pioneering reforms.

== Biography ==
=== Early life ===
Armitage was born in Heidelberg, Germany to British parents, Revd Allan Leathley Armitage and Margaret Merwyn Drake. He was educated at The King's School, Canterbury and the Balliol College, Oxford, where he studied as a modern linguist. Between 1909 and 1911 he was a teacher and lecturer at the University of Rennes, from which he held a diplôme des lettres. He returned to England and became a schoolmaster at the Grange, Folkestone, then at Gore Court, Sittingbourne from 1911 to 1913, followed by Rossall School between 1914 and 1915.

In 1915 Armitage was commissioned into the Northamptonshire Regiment and saw active service in the First World War. He also served with the Provost Corps between 1915 and 1919, which would strongly influence his attitude to school discipline, and was awarded the Military Cross for gallantry.

=== Bloxham School ===
Following the war, he worked at St. Bees School where he was a housemaster between 1922 and 1925. In 1925 he was appointed headmaster of Bloxham School. The decision was an unusual one by the Woodard Corporation, as it usually only appointed members of the Anglican clergy as headmasters of its schools. As headmaster of Bloxham, Armitage embarked upon a program of reforms to raise the status of the school and transform it from a private school for the middle classes into a traditional public school. He introduced a prefect system with enhanced powers and privileges, and created an environment with strict discipline and the regular use of corporal punishment. Discipline was largely left to the senior boys in the school, with masters playing a minor role. Armitage's reforms including daily physical training and an increased emphasis on academic ability. Under his leadership, the school's Officer Training Corps became one of the best in the country. Armitage used his personal connections to secure Bloxham's image as a public school, and it was under his leadership that the school first appeared in Wisden Cricketers' Almanack, first played the Marylebone Cricket Club, first competed at Bisley and first began holding regular club meetings in London. In 1931 he established the Friends of Bloxham society to raise funds and the profile of the school. Among its early patrons were the Bishop of Oxford, the Earl of Halifax and Viscount Hawarden.

Armitage's most lasting legacy was an ambitious building program, the largest at Bloxham School since its foundation. Coinciding with the Great Depression, this was extremely contentious. Fees were also reduced to make the school more competitive, and a result Armitage amounted debts of over £14,000 for the school. The Great Hall, Armitage's most notable project, opened in 1937. He was elected a member of the Headmasters' Conference in 1929 in recognition of his work at Bloxham.

=== Later life ===
In 1940 Armitage, still a reserve officer, was called up and saw active service in the Second World War in the Intelligence Corps. He left the army with the honorary rank of lieutenant-colonel in 1947 and went into retirement. He was awarded the Efficiency Decoration for long service in the Territorial Army. Armtiage married Venetia Mary Stanley Errington Savile, daughter of Reverend William Hale Savile and Mabel von Bothmer, on 5 April 1955.
