= Henry May =

Henry May may refer to:

- Henry May (American politician) (1816–1866), U.S. Representative from Maryland
- Henry May (New Zealand politician) (1912–1995), New Zealand politician
- Henry May (VC) (1885–1941), Scottish recipient of the Victoria Cross
- Henry Allan Roughton May (1863–1930), English army officer
- Henry F. May (1915–2012), American historian
- Henry May (co-operative activist) (1867–1939), British co-operative activist
- Henry John May (priest) (died 1893), Dean of St George's Cathedral, Georgetown, Guyana

== See also ==
- Sir Francis Henry May (1860–1922), Governor of Hong Kong
