= Allbrook (surname) =

Allbrook is an English surname. Notable people with this name include:

- Mark Allbrook, English first-class cricketer and school headmaster
- Nick Allbrook, Australian psychedelic rock musician, singer, songwriter
