= Hewer (surname) =

Hewer is a surname. Notable people with the surname include:

- John Hewer (1922–2008), English actor
- Mitch Hewer (born 1989), English actor
- Nick Hewer (born 1944), former public relations officer, Alan Sugar's advisor on The Apprentice
- Reginald Hewer (1892–1970), British cavalry officer
- William Hewer (1642–1715), British politician
