= Steve Reynolds =

Steve Reynolds may refer to:

- Steve Reynolds (singer-songwriter), Canadian singer-songwriter
- Steve Reynolds (sound engineer), New Orleans sound engineer
- Steve "Peg" Reynolds (1882–1945), Silent film actor
- Stephen Reynolds (writer) (1881–1919),
- Stephen Reynolds (director), Canadian television director
- Stephen Reynolds (footballer) (born 1992), Scottish football player
- Stephen Reynolds (artist) (born 1974), Australian artist
- Stephen P. Reynolds, astrophysicist
