= Thomas Bowler (RAF officer) =

Thomas Bowler CB CBE
- Born: 1 March 1895
- Died: 5 September 1974 (aged 79)
- Allegiance: United Kingdom
- Branch: British Army; Royal Air Force
- Service years: 1914–1951
- Rank: Air-Vice Marshal
- Conflicts: First World War; Second World War
- Awards: Companion of the Order of the Bath, Commander of the Order of the British Empire, Mentioned in Dispatches

Air-Vice Marshal Thomas Geoffrey Bowler CB CBE (1 March 1895 – 5 September 1974) was a senior Royal Air Force officer.

Bowler was educated at Bloxham School in Oxfordshire. He joined the British Army at the outbreak of the First World War, commissioning into the Dorset Regiment. He was promoted to captain on 23 August 1915, and served in the Gallipoli Campaign. He was mentioned in dispatches in 1916. In 1917, he transferred to the Royal Flying Corps. Bowler was made Flight Lieutenant (Aeroplane Branch) in 1919 in the Royal Air Force and afterwards held numerous RAF appointments in England and the Middle East. He started his service in the Second World War as a wing commander, ending the war as an air commodore.

He was promoted to air-vice marshal in 1947. Bowler was made a Companion of the Order of the Bath on 7 June 1951, having retired from the Royal Air Force two months earlier.
