= Ditto Ram =

- Born: 1915; Gehrota, Gurdaspur, India
- Died: 23 July 1944 (aged 28–29); Città di Castello, Italy
- Military career
- Allegiance: United Kingdom
- Branch: British Indian Army
- Service years: 1941–1944
- Rank: Sowar
- Service number: 17308
- Conflicts: Second World War
- Awards: George Cross

Sowar Ditto Ram, GC (1915 – 23 July 1944) was a soldier of the 21st King George V's Own Horse, British Indian Army, who was posthumously awarded the George Cross in the Second World War. He received the award for his gallantry in helping a wounded comrade on 23 July 1944 in the vicinity of Monterchi (Arezzo province) in Italy.

Ditto Ram, who was also known as Ram Ditto, was born in Gehrota, Gurdaspur in India, the son of Sawan Singh and Phoolan.

== Citation ==
Notice of the award of the George Cross to Ram was published in The London Gazette of 13 December 1945.

In Italy on 23rd July, 1944, Sowar DITTO RAM was a member of a patrol which had been ordered to occupy a hill. On reaching the objective the patrol ran onto an enemy Schu minefield suffering casualties amounting to five men injured. Sowar DITTO RAM was among those wounded, his left leg having been blown off below the knee. He applied a field dressing and on hearing calls for help from another Sowar who had also been wounded, he crawled forward through the minefield to assist him. Sowar DITTO RAM was fully aware of the danger to which he was subjecting himself. On reaching the other Sowar, whose left thigh had been shattered, he applied a field dressing to his comrade's wound. He was in the greatest pain throughout, which made the operation both difficult and protracted. Having completed his task, he lost consciousness and died a few minutes later. Sowar DITTO RAM was a very young soldier with only two years' service, nevertheless, besides showing the greatest personal courage and disregard for pain, by crawling through a minefield to help a wounded companion he set the finest example of soldierly comradeship and self-sacrifice. He maintained consciousness only long enough to finish the bandaging of his comrade before he died without a murmur of complaint.

== Memorials ==
Ram's name is inscribed on the Memorial Gate with other Commonwealth George Cross awardees from the Second World War, and on the Cassino Memorial. A plaque in Piazza Umberto I in Monterchi town centre commemorates Sowar Ditto Ram, Lieutenant St John Young and Sowar Niru Chand, all fallen in the same minefield near Casa Tocci.
