= Edward Hugh Dyneley Nicolls =

British colonial official and engineer

Edward Hugh Dyneley Nicolls CMG OBE was a British colonial official and engineer, who served as the Director of Public Works in several British colonies.

He was educated at Bloxham School. He was appointed Director of Public Works in British Cyprus in 1904, and served in that position until 1919. He was invested as an Officer of the Order of the British Empire in 1918. He was invested as a Companion of the Order of St Michael and St George in the 1927 Birthday Honours, while serving as Director of Public Works in Gold Coast.
