= John Vesey-Brown =

English cricketer, soldier and oil industry director

Personal information
- Full name: John Sidney Vesey-Brown
- Born: 1899; Lincoln, Lincolnshire, England
- Died: June 1976 (aged 77); Bermuda
- Batting: Unknown
- Bowling: Unknown

Domestic team information
- Years: Team
- 1939/40–1942/43: Europeans
- 1940/41: Madras

Career statistics
Competition	First-class
Matches	5
Runs scored	48
Batting average	8.00
100s/50s	–/–
Top score	36
Balls bowled	974
Wickets	26
Bowling average	15.88
5 wickets in innings	3
10 wickets in match	1
Best bowling	5/14
Catches/stumpings	2/–
- Source: ESPNcricinfo, 26 November 2023

John Sidney Vesey-Brown OBE (1899 – June 1976) was an English first-class cricketer, British Army officer and a director for the Mobil oil company.

The son of C. S. Vesey-Brown, who was the electrical engineer for Lincoln, Vesey-Brown was born there in 1899. He was educated in Oxfordshire at Bloxham School. After completing his education, he enlisted in the British Army by lying about his age in order to serve in the First World War. He gained a commission as a temporary second lieutenant into the Durham Light Infantry in October 1917. Following the war, he was made a temporary lieutenant in May 1919, before completing his military service in September 1921. Following the end of his military service, he joined the oil company Mobil. During the Second World War, he joined the Royal Norfolk Regiment with the rank of lieutenant colonel and later served as the coordinator of petroleum supplies for British West Africa. For the first two years of his service with the Royal Norfolk Regiment, Vesey-Brown was stationed in British India. There he played first-class cricket, making his first-class debut for the Europeans cricket team against the Indians at Madras in the 1939–40 Madras Presidency Match. He made two further first-class appearances for the Europeans in the 1940–41 and 1942–43 Presidency Matches, in addition to playing for Madras against a touring Ceylon team, and for the Madras Governor's XI against Madras. Playing as a bowler, he took 26 wickets in his five first-class matches at an average of 15.88; he took a five wicket haul on three occasions and once took ten wickets in a match. His best innings figures of 5 for 14 came against Madras.

In 1945, he was seconded to the Ministry of Fuel and Power, where he was employed as an assistant-secretary, and was made an OBE in the 1946 New Year Honours. From 1949, he served as a director at Mobil. Vesey-Brown later retired to Bermuda, where he died in June 1976.
