= John William Hewett =

Rev. John William Hewett (1824-1886) was an English "enthusiastic Anglo-Catholic of extreme views", an educationalist, hymnist, and antiquary.

== Origins ==
He was born in 1824, the son of William Hewett, and was christened on 10 March 1824 at Saint Mary's Church, Aylesbury in Buckinghamshire. In later life he used the motto ('Be Just and Fear Not, which he gave as his school's motto) and the owl crest of the Irish Hewitt family, Viscounts Lifford, but no connection between him and that family has been found by his biographer.

== Career ==
He was educated at Barnstaple Grammar School in Devon (in the process of his bankruptcy it was discovered he owned a house at nearby Bishops Tawton, which had presumably been his own home), and matriculated at Trinity College, Cambridge in Michaelmas 1845, aged 21. In 1848 he served as Honorary Secretary to the Cambridge Architectural Society. He received the degree of BA in 1849, and MA in 1852. In 1849 he was ordained as a deacon at Chichester in West Sussex and as a priest in 1850.

=== Fellow of College of St Nicolas ===
Between 1849 and 1852 he was an assistant master and a Fellow of the Society of the College of St Nicolas, at Shoreham-by-Sea, West Sussex, a college of 17 priests founded in 1848 by Nathaniel Woodard, a member of the Oxford Movement and curate of Shoreham-by-Sea, who in that year also founded "Shoreham Grammar School". This was a fellowship of priests formed with the vision of founding "one middle-class school in every diocese". The College of St Nicolas later became Lancing College. He left in 1852 having been rebuked by Woodard for "a flagrant piece of insubordination", whereupon he determined to found his own school where he could manage things according to his own more extreme Anglo-Catholic ideals, including the requirement for systematic and regular confession.

=== Founds Bloxham School ===
In January 1853 Hewett was appointed curate to Rev. J. Hodgson, the Anglo-Catholic vicar of Bloxham, in Oxfordshire. His main responsibility was to serve the small dilapidated medieval chapel at nearby Milcombe, where in February 1853 he founded his school, which he named All Saints' Grammar School, also known as "Hewett's School". His plan was ambitious as he intended the school to be "the same to the poorer clergy and gentry as Radley & Bradfield are to the richer". The school was supported by Bishop Samuel Wilberforce, a member of the Oxford Movement who shared his interest in education, who commissioned the diocesan architect George Edmund Street to draw up plans for the new school buildings. Street's design was described by The Gentleman's Magazine as the 'most beautiful modern Gothic buildings ever devoted in England to a scholastic purpose'. The foundation stone was blessed by Wilberforce on 7 June 1855. Hewett's plans were for a school for 100 commoners, 40 scholars and an unspecified number of choristers. In February 1855 a trust for the school was established, naming it "All Saints' Grammar School", with the intent of providing for "the liberal education of the sons of the clergy, gentry, Naval, Military and professional men and others". Unknown to the trustees, Hewett was at that time personally insolvent, which made the trust legally invalid, and later allowed his creditors to seize the school's assets. Hewett contributed his own extensive library and the bulk of the funds for the ambitious building project. He was not however a wealthy man, but had recently inherited a modest legacy from his mother, which he invested in the project. It is said that he gave the impression to his business associates and prospective creditors that he was a man of substantial personal means, which persuaded them to trust him.

=== Bankruptcy ===
Having incurred large debts due to his extravagance and poor business acumen, on 27 February 1857 Hewett filed a petition for bankruptcy, following a meeting of his creditors, including his builder and several local tradesmen, a week before in Banbury where his debts were reckoned at about £5,300. The school had failed to attract sufficient numbers of pupils, whom he had expected to pay unusually high fees. Hewett's school, with several dozen pupils and incomplete buildings, was closed in April 1857. The school trust approached Nathaniel Woodard for help, but he refused to support the school. By 1859 the school had been "broken up" and in the autumn of that year the property was due to be sold by auction, but was purchased and resurrected by Rev. Philip Reginald Egerton, then a curate of nearby Deddington, who successfully refounded the school, today surviving as Bloxham School.

=== Later career ===
The failure of his school totally ruined him and he "went forth as literally bare as the bailiffs could wish". He later admitted: "I was too sanguine. Too blindly sanguine. I ought to have known it was impossible. I ought to have known that no promise of success justified incurring debt, especially on so large a scale, or the involving friends, though I am sure I never reckoned that they would be losers by me'.

After his bankruptcy, he managed to obtain successive posts as curate in various parishes until 1874 when he was appointed Senior Classical Master in the North London College School, a girls' school founded in 1850, which post he retained until 1878.

== Marriage and children ==
He married in about 1855 and had 4 children.

== Death & assessment ==
He died on 20 April 1886 at Claybrooke, near Lutterworth in Leicestershire. In 1907 one of his friends, Rev. W. D. Macray wrote of him in connection with his venture of Bloxham School:

"He had great enthusiasm but he had not some of the other qualities necessary for carrying out such a work. In faith he gave literally his all and died poor, disheartened, and what the world would perhaps call a failure".

However the present school does acknowledge that:

"In spite of all, however, the School is there and but for his devotion would never have been. Hewett chose its name and its motto, both of which are still in use. He chose and bought the site and erected there the first range of school buildings, in stone and built by one of the best Victorian architects. Still today it is the most prominent school building seen from the main road approaching the school, and most boys have entered the school for the first time through its doorway "

== List of works ==
=== Antiquarian works ===
- Remarks on the Monumental Brasses and Certain Decorative Remains in the Cathedral Church of St Peter, Exeter, to which is Appended a Complete Monumentarium, (a full listing of monuments and transcription of inscriptions in Exeter Cathedral), published in Transactions of the Exeter Diocesan Architectural Society, Volume 3, Exeter, 1846-9, pp. 90–138
- Editor of The Sealed Copy of the Prayer Book, 1848;
- A Brief History and Description of the Cathedral Church of St Peter, Exeter. Hewett was then Honorary Secretary to the Cambridge Architectural Society.
- A Brief History and Description of the Conventual and Cathedral Church of the Holy Trinity, Ely, Cambridge, 1848
- The Arrangement of Parish Churches considered, Cambridge, 1848, a paper read before the Cambridge Architectural Society, on 18 February 1848.
- Early Wood carving: Twenty examples selected form the miseries in the choir of St Peter Exeter Shoreham:Allever Butler 1849 This contains 20 plates printed using anastatic lithography Samuel Cowell of Ipswich

=== Hymns ===
- Verses by a Country Curate, 1859, hymns and translations, including:
  - In the Name of God the Father
  - Jesu, now Thy New-Made Soldier
  - What Time the Evening Shadows Fall
  - Withdraw from Every Human Eye
- Jesu, our Lenten fast to Thee, translation in Hymns Ancient & Modern;
- O Thou Who dost to man accord, translation in Hymns Ancient & Modern;
- Various hymns contributed to the Lyra Messianica, 1864; and *Jesus, Thy Presence We Adore
- Latin Hymns, see: Duffield, Samuel Willoughby, The Latin Hymn-Writers and their Hymns, London, 1889

== Sources ==
- John Julian, Dictionary of Hymnology
- Smith, Brian S., History of Bloxham School, published by Bloxham School and the Old Bloxhamist Society, 1978, pp. 1–12
