= Cecil Moore (RAF officer) =

Cecil T. N. Moore MBE DFC
- Military career
- Allegiance: United Kingdom
- Branch: Royal Air Force
- Service years: 1940-1966
- Rank: Squadron Leader
- Unit: RAF Regiment
- Commands: No. 2603 (City of Edinburgh) LAA Squadron
- Conflicts: Second World War; Korean War
- Awards: Member of the Order of the British Empire, Distinguished Flying Cross

Squadron Leader Cecil Thomas Nixon Moore MBE DFC was a Royal Air Force officer.

He was educated at Bloxham School. He served in the ranks of the RAF during the Second World War, and was promoted to corporal in 1942. He commissioned into the Royal Air Force Regiment in 1948. He saw active service in the Korean War and was awarded the Distinguished Flying Cross. He was invested as a Member of the Order of the British Empire on 1 June 1953 in the 1953 Coronation Honours. His period of service was extended on 25 May 1954. He became Squadron Leader in 1955 and took command of No. 2603 (City of Edinburgh) Light Anti-Aircraft Squadron. He received a permanent commission in the Secretarial Branch of the RAF on 20 April 1956. He relinquished his commission on 26 April 1966.
