= St John Young =

British recipient of the George Cross

St John Graham Young
- Born: 16 June 1921; Esher, Surrey
- Died: 24 July 1944 (aged 23); Italy
- Burial place: Arezzo War Cemetery
- Military career
- Rank: Lieutenant
- Unit: Royal Tank Regiment
- Conflicts: Second World War; Italian campaign †
- Awards: George Cross

Lieutenant St John Graham Young GC (16 June 1921 – 24 July 1944) was a decorated British Army officer of the Second World War.

He was posthumously awarded the George Cross, the highest British (and Commonwealth) award for bravery out of combat, for his heroism in rescuing his comrades from a minefield in Italy on 23 July 1944. He was serving with the Royal Tank Regiment, attached to the Central India Horse, part of the Indian Armoured Corps.

Notice of the award was published in the London Gazette on 20 July 1945. Young had been leading a night patrol on 23 July 1944, when he and his men found themselves in an enemy minefield. He received the full force of a mine explosion, severely injuring both legs. Despite his wounds, his encouragement enabled the majority of his men to reach safety. One of them, Sowar Ditto Ram, was also posthumously awarded the GC for his actions in the same incident.

Young was born in Esher in Surrey, educated at Bloxham School in Oxfordshire and commissioned into the RTR in 1942. He is buried in Arezzo War Cemetery.
