= Charles Henry Alexandrowicz =

Lawyer and scholar of international law

- Born: Karol Aleksandrowicz; 13 October 1902; Lviv
- Died: 26 September 1975 (aged 72)
- Occupations: Lawyer and scholar of international law

Charles Henry Alexandrowicz (13 October 1902 – 26 September 1975), born Karol Aleksandrowicz, was a lawyer and scholar of international law.

Born in Lviv, Alexandrowicz attended primary school at the Schottengymnasium in Vienna and studied law at Jagiellonian University, graduating with a doctorate in 1926. Subsequently, he worked for the Bank of Poland for three years, and then until 1939 practised law in Kraków and Katowice. Just before the outbreak of war in 1939, he accepted a lectureship at the Higher School of Social Sciences in Katowice. At the beginning of hostilities, Alexandrowicz was commissioned into the Polish army and was involved in fighting against both Soviet and German forces before the collapse of the Polish government. He then was able to escape to Romania, where he with other exiles attempted to preserve the continuity of the Polish state. Increasing hostility from the Romanian authorities led Alexandrowicz and other exiles to decamp first to Istanbul and then, eventually, to London, where the Polish government-in-exile had been established after the fall of France. Initially, Alexandrowicz acted as a financial counsellor to the Polish embassy and then as a governor of the Polish national development bank, Bank Gospodarstwa Krajowego. He simultaneously served in the British Home Guard. In 1945, Alexandrowicz was appointed Director-General of the European Central Inland Transport Organization (ECITO), a new United Nations specialist agency.

Following the absorption of ECITO by the Economic Commission for Europe in 1947, Alexandrowicz returned to the law and was called to the bar of Lincoln's Inn in 1948. He became a British citizen in 1950.

From London he moved to India in 1951 to teach at the University of Madras, publishing on Indian constitutional law. He spent a decade at the university and then moved to the University of Sydney in 1961. He retired from academic life in 1967.

Alexandrowicz's scholarship emphasises a tradition of international law rooted in the work of natural law theorists such as Grotius—a tradition he saw as universalist—as opposed to later European theorists, who embraced Eurocentric views of the law of nations.

== Publications (partial) ==
- International Economic Organizations, London Institute of World Affairs, London 1952
- Constitutional Developments in India, Oxford University Press, Bombay 1957 ISBN 9780598776587
- World Economic Agencies, Law and Practice, Stevens & Sons, London 1962, Praeger, 1963
- The Law of Global Communications, Columbia University Press, New York & London 1971 ISBN 9780231035293
- The Law-Making Functions of the Specialized Agencies of the U.N., Angus and Robertson in association with the Australian Institute of International Affairs, Sydney 1973 ISBN 978-0207127403

== Sources ==
- Armitage, David; Pitts, Jennifer, eds. (18 May 2017). "'This Modern Grotius': An Introduction to the Life and Thought of C. H. Alexandrowicz". The Law of Nations in Global History. Oxford University Press. doi:10.1093/acprof:oso/9780198766070.003.0001.
