= David Eastwood (British Army officer) =

British Army officer

David Eastwood CBE MC
- Born: 27 January 1919; Bangor, Wales
- Died: 29 October 2010 (aged 91); France
- Military career
- Allegiance: United Kingdom
- Branch: British Army
- Service years: 1940–1947
- Rank: Lieutenant
- Service number: 121135
- Units: Oxfordshire and Buckinghamshire Light Infantry; Parachute Regiment
- Conflicts: Second World War
- Awards: Commander of the Order of the British Empire; Military Cross

Lieutenant Herbert David Eastwood CBE MC (27 January 1919 – 29 October 2010) was a British Army officer who was awarded the Military Cross for courage during Operation Market Garden in the Second World War.

== Early life and military career ==
Eastwood was born in Bangor, Gwynedd, and educated at Bloxham School and St Edmund Hall, Oxford. He commissioned into the Oxfordshire and Buckinghamshire Light Infantry on 16 February 1940, and was posted to India on internal security duties. After the Battle of France, his regiment was recalled to England to become part of the 31st Independent Infantry Brigade, and later the 1st Airlanding Brigade. Eastwood was appointed GSO3 (Air) and took part in the Allied invasion of Sicily. He was subsequently given the job of briefing the D-Day planners on the lessons to be learned from the errors made in the Italian campaign.

=== Operation Market Garden ===
Eastwood's company landed on 17 September 1944 as part of the British element of Operation Market Garden. Eastwood and his men were responsible for securing and protecting drop zones (DZs) in preparation for the arrival of the 1st Parachute Brigade. On the next evening Eastwood, in command of No.1 platoon, was detailed to put out navigational aids for a supply drop. Finding Germans in occupation of the zone in some strength, he attacked, killing some and capturing the rest.

On 19 September he returned to the DZ to assist in the landing of the first wave of Polish gliders. As soon as these appeared, the Germans attacked. Eastwood and his men drove them off until all the gliders had been unloaded. Cut off, however, he led his platoon through enemy positions under cover of darkness and reached Ommershof on the north-western outskirts of Arnhem. They dug in there and remained for two days before reinforcing the defensive perimeter around the nearby Hartenstein Hotel. For the next four days they held the crucial area near the Schoonord crossroads, which was constantly exposed to heavy enemy fire. Regardless of personal danger, Eastwood constantly moved between his sections encouraging his men. In spite of numerous attacks and heavy casualties, their morale was such that they remained in position until ordered to withdraw back across the Rhine on 25 September. He was immediately recommended for, and subsequently awarded, the Military Cross.

Citation

The above officer led his platoon with great gallantry throughout the action. On the evening of 18.9.44, he was detailed with his platoon to put out navigational aids on L.Z. "L" for a supply drop. He found the enemy in occupation of this area in some strength. He immediately attacked them, killing or capturing the lot. On 19.9.44, he again returned to this area to assist in the landing of gliders. As soon as the gliders appeared the enemy put in an attack. This was driven off and the enemy held until all the gliders had been unloaded. Later he found that his route back to the Company area had been cut off by the enemy, but he successfully led his platoon through the enemy positions.

From 20.9.44 until the withdrawal on 25.9.44, he held a position which was constantly exposed to murderous enemy fire, but regardless of personal danger he went constantly round his section positions encouraging his men. He kept the spirits of his men at such a high level that in spite of numerous enemy attacks and heavy casualties, they hung on to their positions until the end.

Eastwood further served with the 21st Company in the Battle of Arnhem and in the liberation of Norway. He relinquished his commission in 1947.

== Post-war ==
Following the end of the war, Eastwood joined the colonial Malayan Civil Service in 1947. He learned to speak Malay and served there during the Malay Emergency. Eastwood became district commissioner for Trengganu, on the country's eastern coast, where he wrote the Land Law for the State before going to Malacca. Returning to England after Malaya achieved independence in 1957, he joined the Ministry of Defence in 1959. After serving in Jamaica he completed a four-year tour of Northern Ireland during The Troubles, working in intelligence for the Northern Ireland Office. He was invested as a Commander of the Order of the British Empire in 1973.
