= Bloxham School =

Public school in Oxfordshire, England

All Saints' School or Bloxham School

Location
- Bloxham; Banbury, Oxfordshire, OX15 4PE; England; 52.0225°N 1.3733°W

Information
- Type: Private School; Boarding school
- Motto: Justorum semita lux splendens (The path of the just is a shining light)
- Religious affiliation: Church of England Woodard Schools
- Established: 1853 (original foundation); 1860 (present foundation)
- Founder: Philip Reginald Egerton
- Department for Education URN: 123275 Tables
- Headmaster: Paul Sanderson
- Chaplain: Henry Swayne
- Gender: Coeducational
- Age: 11 to 18
- Houses: Seven senior boarding houses, one senior day house, one junior house
- Colours: Black & White
- Publication: The Bloxhamist
- Former pupils: Old Bloxhamists
- Affiliation: Woodard Corporation; HMC
- School Hymn: For All the Saints; A Shining Light
- Website: www.bloxhamschool.com

Bloxham School is a private co-educational day and boarding school of the British public school tradition, located in the village of Bloxham, three miles (5 km) from the town of Banbury in Oxfordshire, England. The present school was founded in 1860 by Philip Reginald Egerton and has since become a member of the Woodard Corporation. The current headmaster is Paul Sanderson, who took over from Mark Allbrook in 2013. The school has approximately 580 pupils with a maximum current capacity of 600.

The school is affiliated with Woodard Schools, as only the governors/governing body is fully responsible for the school's performance, but hold responsibility to the Woodard Board. On Woodard Schools website it is listed under "Woodard Incorporated Schools (independent)".

Founded as a school of the Oxford Movement, Bloxham is a member of the Headmasters' and Headmistresses' Conference.

== History ==
=== Hewett's school ===
The original school on the site in the north of the village of Bloxham was founded in 1853 by John William Hewett (1824–1886), a local Anglo-Catholic curate. The school was supported by Samuel Wilberforce, who commissioned the diocesan architect, George Edmund Street, to draw up plans for the new school buildings. Street's design was described by The Gentleman's Magazine as the 'most beautiful modern Gothic buildings ever devoted in England to a scholastic purpose'. The foundation stone was blessed by Wilberforce on 7 June 1855. Hewett's plans were for a school for 100 commoners, 40 scholars and an unspecified number of choristers.

In February 1855, a trust for the school was established, naming it All Saints' Grammar School, with the intent of providing for 'the liberal education of the sons of the clergy, gentry, Naval, Military and professional men and others'. Hewett contributed his extensive library and the bulk of the funds for the ambitious building project. By mid-1856, Hewett was bankrupt, and the school had failed to attract sufficient numbers of boys, who were expected to pay unusually high fees. Hewett's school, with several dozen pupils and incomplete buildings, was closed in April 1857. The school trust approached Nathaniel Woodard for help, but he was uninterested in buying or supporting the school.

=== Egerton's school ===
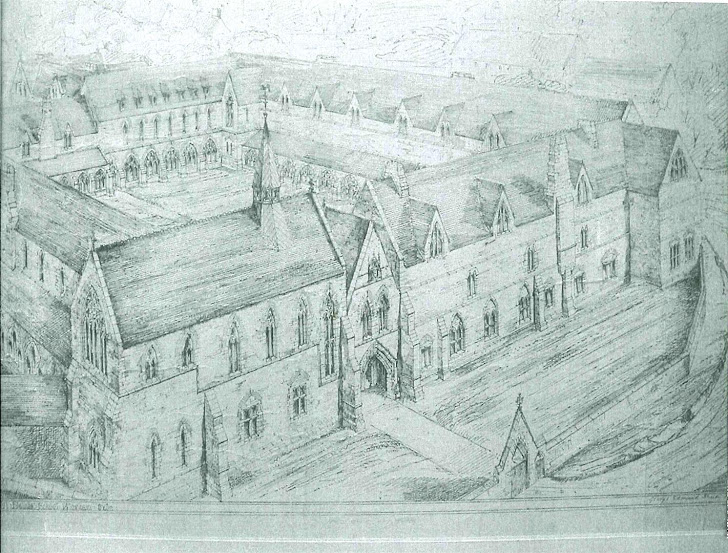
G. E. Street's plans for Bloxham School.

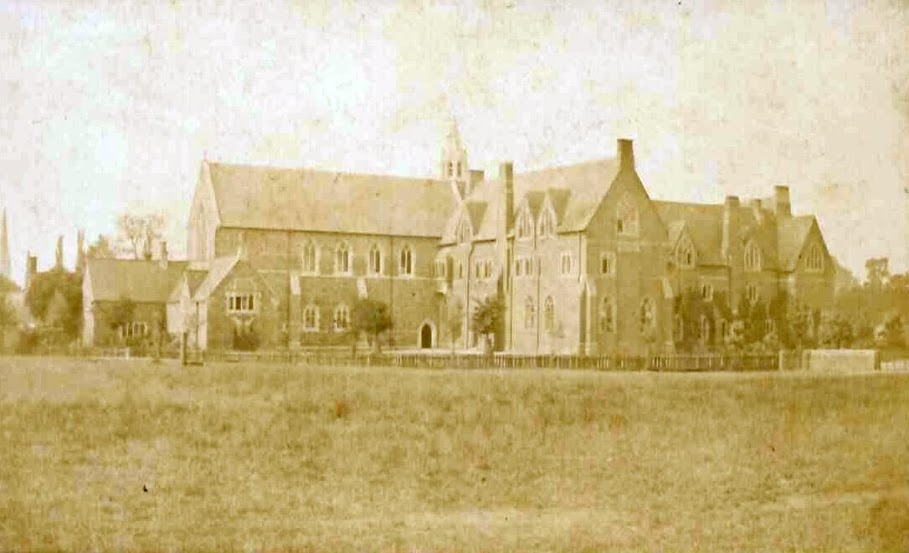
The School from the front, circa 1890, before the construction of the Memorial Arch.

In 1859, Hewett's dilapidated school buildings were bought for £1,615 by Philip Reginald Egerton, a Church of England curate working in Deddington. Like Hewett, he was strongly influenced by the Oxford Movement and sought to establish a new school to teach its values. Egerton adopted the previous foundation's name of All Saints' School, and its motto, but based the school's ethos on that of his alma mater, Winchester College. He sought the backing of several notable academics and clergymen, including Wilberforce, Woodard and Henry Liddon. The project was initially funded by Egerton's wealthy wife, Harriet, and received its first pupil on 31 January 1860.

Under the personal leadership of Egerton, Bloxham initially provided education for middle-class boys in the public school tradition, although classics was originally not widely taught. In 1861 there were 29 pupils and by 1863 there were 60. Thanks to Wilberforce's continued support, Street drew up new plans for expanding the neo-Gothic school buildings, and additional money was provided by John Hubbard, 1st Baron Addington and John Spencer-Churchill, 7th Duke of Marlborough. The new buildings were unveiled in 1864 in the presence of Thomas Parker, 6th Earl of Macclesfield and Benjamin Disraeli. The Chapel Wing, the last of Street's buildings, was opened on 21 February 1873.

The school quickly grew, rising to two hundred pupils in twenty years. Despite Egerton's plans for the school to provide for local farmers and tradesmen, a report in 1870 found that most of the boys were from professional, ecclesiastical and military families. An 1879 plan by Egerton and Liddon to affiliate the school with Keble College, Oxford never came to fruition, and Egerton was forced to look elsewhere to ensure the school's long-term viability. The Bloxham School Trust was established in 1884, and in 1897 the school was admitted into the Woodard Corporation. Frederick Scobell Boissier, father of Harrow headmaster Arthur Boissier, taught at Bloxham from 1878 to 1898 and was headmaster from 1886.

Education at the school focused on the notions of religious and civic duty, and the Anglo-Catholic nature of the foundation of the school remained a defining feature. Proposals to secularise the school by renaming it 'Bloxham College' were rejected in 1911 and 1951. Bloxham's first headmaster to not be a priest was only appointed in 1925.

During the 1890s, Bloxham shrank in size as the local provision of state education improved. The Education Act 1902 worsened the situation, as did a growing prejudice against high church practices in schools. The school's impressive academic record and high Oxbridge entrant rates in the 1900s helped it to survive. By the 1910s, a prefect system, house rivalries, corporal punishment and fagging confirmed Bloxham's identity as a conforming public school, although the latter two practices were abolished in the 1970s. Like many public schools, Bloxham suffered disproportionately high casualties during the First World War, in which over 400 current and former pupils served and 79 were killed. The school survived the subsequent economic depression, and embarked upon a series of ambitious educational and building reforms led by the school's first lay headmaster, Valentine Armitage. During the 1960s the school pioneered a tutoring system in which boys of multiple year groups shared a tutor. This system has since been imitated by many other boarding schools. Girls started to be admitted into the sixth form in small numbers in the early 1970s and the school became fully co-educational in 1998. The Lower School, for pupils aged 11–13, was opened in 1994.

== Buildings and facilities ==
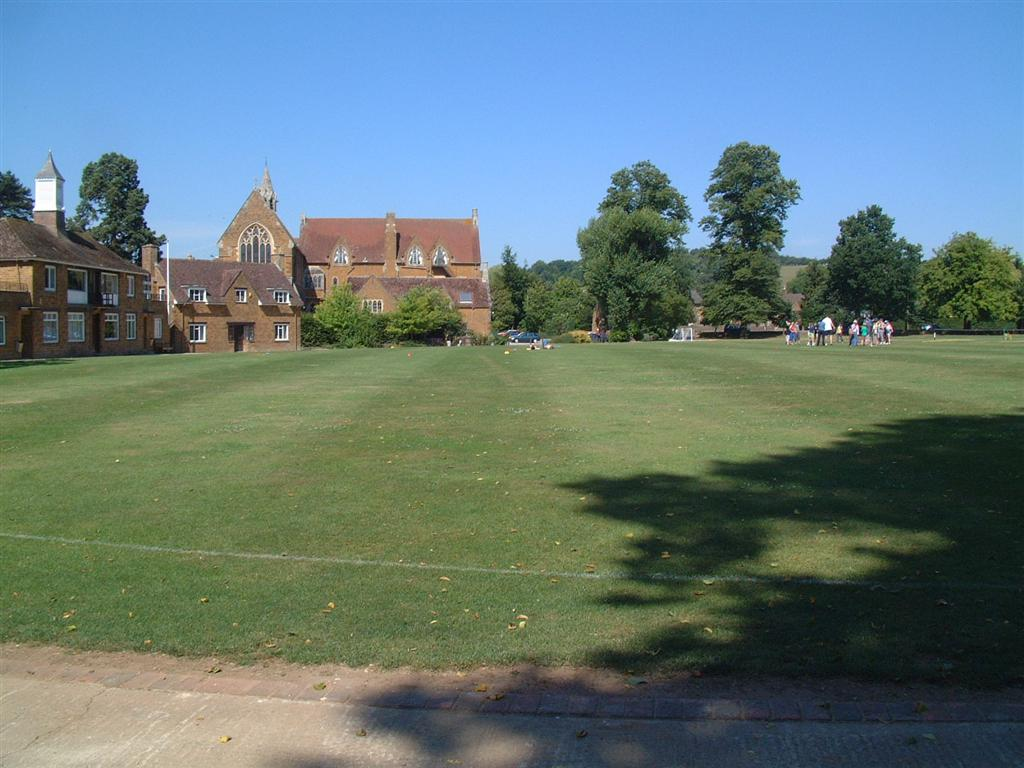
A view over Main Field, with the cricket pavilion to the left and the school chapel in the background.

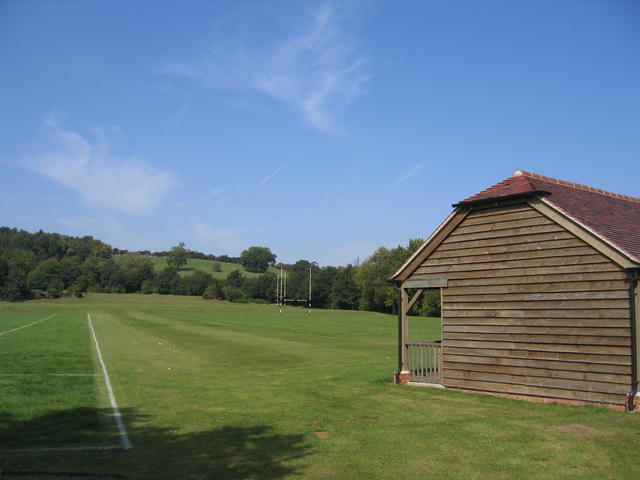
The 'Pig Sty' playing fields beneath Hobb Hill, Bloxham.

Bloxham School has grounds which cover approximately 60 acres (240,000 m^{2}) in the village of Bloxham. The Neo-Gothic complex of buildings designed by George Edmund Street, called Main School, dominates the school and the north end of the village. It contains two boarding houses, Crake and Wilson, the dining hall, the Masters' Dining Room, the Headmaster's office, the chapel, the 1894 Egerton Library and a number of classrooms. Palmer House, built in 1874 in the Neo-Gothic style, is the school hospital. Egerton House, on the edge of the school campus, was built in 1876 as the Headmaster's House, and was enlarged in 1886. The school's Great Hall was completed in 1937 and was built in the traditional Cotswold style. The Victorian-era Wesley Theatre, a former Methodist chapel, is the school theatre. The Science Block was built between 1959 and 1966. Wilberforce House was built in the late 1960s and Raymond House was opened in 1971 by Margaret Thatcher.

Recent building developments include the Raymond Technology Centre, the expansion of the Lower School building and the Vallance Library which was opened by Colin Dexter in April 2006. New squash courts have also been built next to the Dewey Sports Centre, and the art school has been increased in size. The extension to the 1901 music school was completed in the summer of 2007, and officially opened by Aled Jones in November 2008. The sixth form is located in a modernised building called The White Lion, a former public house on the edge of the school campus.

Bloxham has a Church of England chapel which can accommodate approximately two hundred people. It was built at first-floor level with classrooms beneath, giving it an elevated position. At its west end is a balcony and organ loft, with an octagonal turret containing the bell tower rising above Main School. At the east end of the chapel is a Te Deum window made by Clayton and Bell in memory of Wilberforce. The chapel also contains a rood screen, windows in memory of Egerton and the Boer Wars, and monuments to the school's war dead. The reredos was designed by Bucknall in 1912. The smaller Liddon Chapel, adjacent to the main chapel, is used as a classroom.

Bloxham School has four playing fields, three of which are used for cricket in the summer term. It has two AstroTurf all-weather pitches, which are used for hockey and tennis, as well as additional hard tennis courts. The Dewey Sports Centre, opened by Anne, Princess Royal in 1986, has an indoor sports hall, a gym and a climbing wall. Along with the swimming pool, which was refurbished in 2014, it is available for public use. Bloxham also has Fives courts.

Deer Park is where the bursary is situated, as well as some of the buildings used by the CCF, including the armoury and shooting range. Woollen Hale, the house of Bloxham headmasters since 1986, is on the top of Hobb Hill, overlooking playing fields and the Main School.

== Houses ==
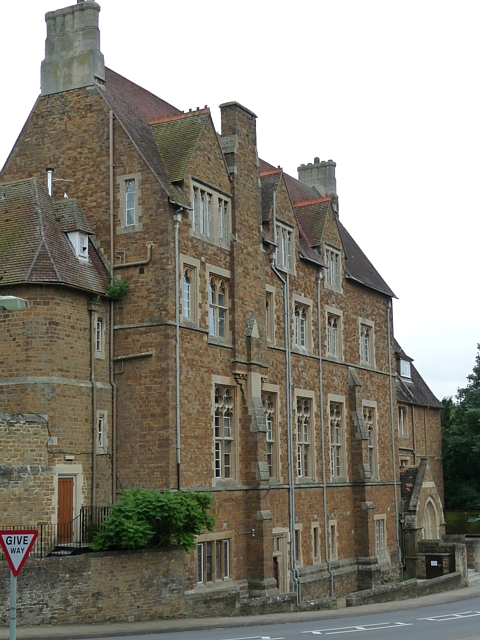
Wilson House and the Dining Hall, completed in 1869, as viewed from Bloxham High Street.

Like most traditional public schools, houses form the basis of school organisation and are incorporated into the boarding system. There are seven boarding houses within the senior school, as well as one day house (Merton). The boarding houses are Crake, Egerton, Raymond, Seymour, Stonehill, Wilberforce and Wilson, with Raymond, Stonehill and Wilberforce being the girls' houses. There is also a junior boarding house, Park Close, for the first form (Year 7) and second form (Year 8) weekly boarders, but all junior pupils are members of Exham House.

The school operates a house-based tutor system, in which pupils of several year groups share a tutor within one house. All houses are made up of both boarders and day pupils, who are called 'day boarders'. House captains are appointed each year and make up part of the school's prefect body. The two oldest houses are Crake and Wilson, previously called School House, with all the other houses constituted later. The newest boarding house to be built was Seymour, which was finished in 1982. Although Stonehill and Merton, in the current establishment were the last to be constituted but in older buildings than Seymour. Houses provide a focus for social and sporting activity, with rivalries existing between different houses.

== Religion ==
=== Chapel ===
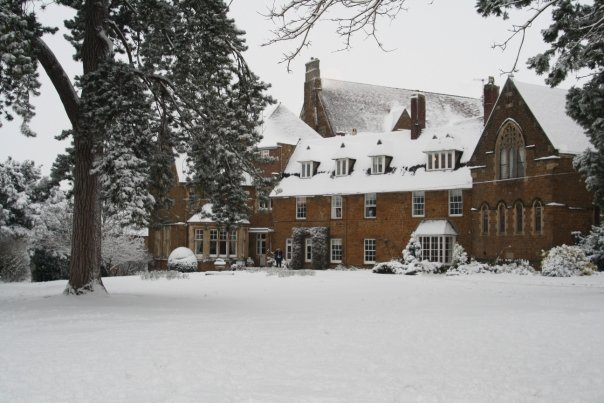
A view over the Headmaster's Lawn, with the Headmaster's Study to the left, the Masters' Dining Room in the centre and the Egerton Library to the right.

The school has hosted the Bloxham Festival of Faith and Literature since October 2011.

The school requires all students to visit a chapel service that is held in the school's chapel every week on Wednesday morning, service lasting from 20 to 40 minutes. Students that are partaking in exams or otherwise unable to attend it are only expected to attend the next service. The services are run by the school's chaplain, and the service style changes with change of chaplain.

For some events the school is gathered in St Mary's church, as it is impossible to fit the entire school into chapel. Events that are held in the church are mostly 1st or last service of a term, which coincidentally often fall on religious holidays.

=== Bloxham Project ===
The Bloxham Project is an inter-school council started in the 1960s to address the role of religion in schools. It was started by the Chairman of Bloxham School Council and the school chaplain, Donald Dowie. The first Bloxham Conference on Public School Religion took place in 1967 at Bloxham School, and today approximately 120 independent schools take part in the project. It is a full-time organisation which continues to promote Christian educational values in the United Kingdom. The project is currently run from Ripon College Cuddesdon near Oxford, where several of Bloxham's headmasters have been educated.

== Sport ==
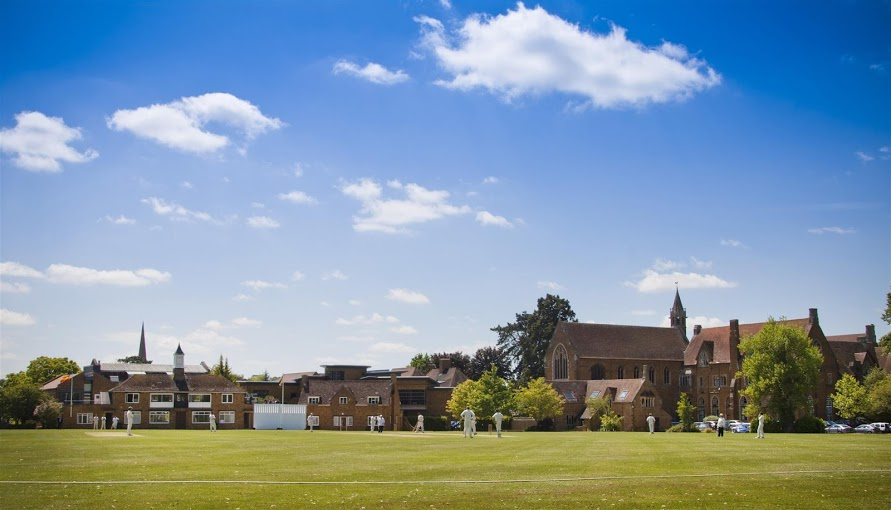
Bloxham's 1st XI cricket team plays Marylebone Cricket Club in 2010.

Sport plays a significant role in Bloxham life, with afternoons on Tuesdays, Wednesdays and Saturdays being allocated to games' practices and matches for pupils in years 9–13. Every pupil in the school is involved in sport, with the aim being that each pupil will represent the school in at least one team during their time at Bloxham. The major sports are rugby, hockey and cricket for boys, and hockey, netball and tennis for girls. Other sports played at Bloxham include squash, athletics, swimming, golf, horse riding, polo, target shooting, basketball, clay pigeon shooting, fives, sailing, cross-country and badminton.

== Societies and pastimes ==
Bloxham has several societies, some of which are pupil-run. School societies include the Scholars Society, the Debating Society and the Common Room Society. The Choral Society, or Chapel Choir, sing twice a week during the school's chapel services. Clubs include a Photography Club, a Wildlife Club and a Model Railway Club. Bloxham School was host of the British Youth Go Tournament in 2011. Pupils can take part in other activities, such as the Duke of Edinburgh Award, drama, community service, dance, adventure training, horse riding and management and horticulture.

Bloxham runs a Combined Cadet Force (CCF) for pupils in third form (Year 9) and above. This was founded in 1910 as the school's Officers' Training Corps. Most terms there is a CCF over-night expedition and a range day. The CCF was formerly affiliated with the Royal Green Jackets and is now affiliated with its successor regiment, The Rifles.

The school has a music department which offers professional tuition in brass, guitar, keyboard, organ, percussion, singing, strings and woodwind.

The school magazine is called The Bloxhamist and is published annually, at the beginning of Michaelmas term.

== Prefects ==
The school's prefect system was introduced in a form by Armitage in the late 1920s. Prefects were solemnly initiated in chapel, and once in office they were responsible for much of the daily administration of the school. Prefects were in charge of most discipline and a prefectural code was introduced; school prefects could give up to six strokes with a cane, and house prefects three.

Currently, prefects only serve symbolic roles: charity prefect, sports prefect, etc and do not have or serve any other duties.

== Motto and arms ==
The motto of Bloxham School is taken from Hewitt's 1853 school. A quotation from the Book of Proverbs, it is Justorum Semita Lux Splendens (Latin), which translates as "The path of the just is a shining light". Until 2009, the school arms was that of the Egerton family, although this usage was never registered with the College of Arms. It is now a stylised version of the original coat-of-arms.

== Fees ==
Senior school (13–18)
Boarder type	Fees per term	Fees annual (3 terms)	Table updated
Senior overseas boarders	£18,710	£56,130	Nov 2026
Senior national boarders	£17,530	£52,590	Nov 2026
Senior day boarders	£13,600	£40,800	Nov 2026
Senior day house	£9,490	£28,470	Nov 2026

Additional overnight stays for day boarders are charged at £59 a night.

Lower school (11–13)
Boarder type	Fees per term	Fees annual (3 terms)	Table updated
Weekly boarders	£11,910	£35,730	Nov 2026
Day boarders	£10,850	£32,550	Nov 2026
Day house	£9,260	£27,780	Nov 2026

Additional overnight stays for day boarders are charged at £65 a night.

== Notable alumni ==
Current members of the school are known as 'Bloxhamists' with alumni referred to as 'Old Bloxhamists', or OBs for short. Notable OBs include:

Military

- Colonel Sir Thomas Boswall Beach
- Brigadier-General Sir William Henry Beach
- Air Vice-Marshal Thomas Bowler
- General Sir Adrian Bradshaw, Deputy Supreme Allied Commander Europe
- General Sir Edward Burgess, NATO Deputy Supreme Allied Commander
- Garrison Sergeant Major Vivian Davenport
- Major General Richard Roderick Davis
- Lieutenant David Eastwood
- Brigadier-General Wilfred Ellershaw, Aide-de-Camp to Lord Kitchener
- Squadron Leader Dave Glaser
- Colonel L. A. Grimston
- Major-General Reginald Hewer
- Air Marshal Sir Francis John Linnell
- Captain Harry Godfrey Massy-Miles
- Colonel Sir Henry Allan Roughton May
- Air Commodore Sir Dennis Mitchell
- Squadron Leader C. T. N. Moore
- Admiral of the Fleet Sir Gerard Noel, Commander-in-Chief, Home Fleet
- Lieutenant-General Dudley Sheridan Skelton, Honorary Surgeon to HM King George V
- Major-General Bruce M. Skinner, Surgeon-General to the British Armed Forces
- Major Derrick le Poer Trench
- Lieutenant St John Graham Young
- Brigadier Dimitry Dimitrievitch Zvegintzov

Government and politics

- Peter J P Barwell, Lord Mayor of Birmingham 1992–3
- Sir Peter H. Clutterbuck, colonial civil servant in British India
- Alexander Granville, colonial administrator in Egypt
- Sir Gerald Howarth, Conservative politician and member of parliament
- Eustace Maude, 7th Viscount Hawarden, peer and colonial provincial governor in Sudan
- E. H. D. Nicolls, British colonial official
- Denis Norman, former Government Minister in Zimbabwe
- Frederic Urquhart, colonial administrator in Australia

Religion

- Fr Sergei Hackel, senior priest in Britain of the Russian Orthodox Diocese of Sourozh.
- George Hand, Anglican bishop

The arts

- George S Elgood, painter
- Ross Nichols, academic, poet, artist and historian
- Stephen Reynolds, writer
- Tom Sharpe, novelist
- Peter Snow, painter, theatre designer and teacher
- Albert Chevallier Tayler, painter
- Leonard Shuffrey, the notable architect and architectural designer attended Bloxham between 1856 and 1867.
- Henry Tonks, artist
- Pip Torrens, actor

Other

- Alfie Barbeary, rugby union player
- Will Bratt, Formula Three racing driver
- G. Kenneth Jenkins, Keeper of the Coins at the British Museum
- Thomas Sanderson-Wells
- John Sergeant, journalist
- Ward Thomas, television executive
- John Vesey-Brown, first-class cricketer

=== Bloxham School war dead ===
The stone arch at the main entrance to the school was built to the memory of Bloxham pupils who have died in conflict, and the school chapel contains memorials to the school's war dead from multiple conflicts. Bloxham suffered a high casualty rate during World War I, in which 79 current and former pupils were killed. The portraits of the school's dead of the First World War are hung near the chapel.

== Headmasters ==
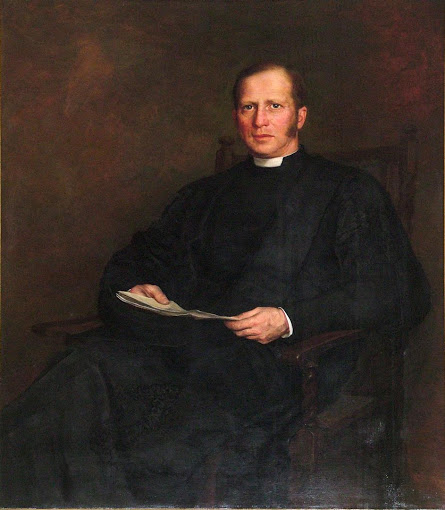
The Founder, Philip Egerton.

The first five headmasters at Bloxham were ordained Anglican priests, with the first lay headmaster being appointed in 1925. The portraits of former headmasters hang in the school dining hall.

- Philip Egerton (1860–1886)
- F. S. Boissier (1886–1898)
- G. H. Ward (1899–1914)
- Alexander Grier (1914–1919)
- F. H. George (1919–1925)
- Valentine Armitage (1925–1940)
- K. T. Dewey (1940–1952)
- R. S. Thompson (1952–1965)
- D. R. G. Seymour (1965–1982)
- M. W. Vallance (1982–1991)
- D. K. Exham (1991–2002)
- Mark Allbrook (2002–2013)
- P. Sanderson (2013–present)

== Notable masters ==
- Cedric Boyns, housemaster
- Felix Francis, crime writer, Bloxham Head of Science 1984–1991
- Cyril Frost, artist and silversmith
- David Hatch, student teacher
- Kenneth Spring, former Commander of the CCF, housemaster and art master
