= Philip Egerton (priest) =

English priest and schoolmaster

Philip Reginald Egerton
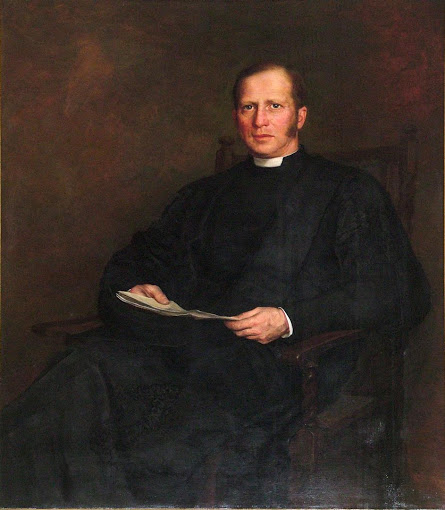
- Egerton as Founder of Bloxham School
- Born: 14 July 1832; Bunbury, Cheshire
- Died: 28 April 1911 (aged 78); Vale Mascal, Bexley
- Burial place: North Cray
- Occupations: Priest and schoolmaster
- Spouse: Harriet Gould
- Parent(s): John Egerton, Ellen Gould

Philip Reginald Egerton (14 July 1832 – 28 April 1911) was an English priest in the Church of England and schoolmaster, who re-founded Bloxham School in Oxfordshire in 1860.

== Early life ==
Egerton was born in Bunbury, Cheshire, the son of John Egerton and Ellen Gould. Through his grandmother, he was a descendant of William of Wykeham and he was educated at Winchester College as Founder's Kin, where he was school captain. He proceeded to New College, Oxford in 1851 where he studied for a bachelor's degree in civil law. In 1855 he entered Cuddesdon Theological College, founded two years earlier by Bishop Wilberforce, to train as a priest. He was ordained as a deacon on 20 December 1857 and became curate in Deddington in north Oxfordshire.

== Foundation of Bloxham School ==
By 1859 he was considering emigrating to New Zealand, when he came across a complex of dilapidated neo-Gothic school buildings in the nearby village of Bloxham. Egerton had been considering starting a school for several years, and immediately purchased the buildings for £1,615. Egerton perceived that by the mid-19th century, a gap had emerged in Britain's education system whereby there was no provision for the emerging middle classes. Bloxham School was founded to act as a school for the sons of professionals, military officers and local landowners in the model of the great public schools, especially that of his own alma mater, Winchester. The school received its first pupil in 1860. In his foundation, Egerton was heavily influenced by Nathaniel Woodard, who had established a new model for Anglo-Catholic public schools. Bloxham would eventually become a Woodard School, despite Woodard initially advising Egerton not to found his school.

Egerton was influenced by the Oxford Movement and sought to provide a public school education for boys based on Anglo-Catholic principles. He had his new school buildings designed by one of the great architects of the day, George Edmund Street, and the institution was named All Saints' School. Egerton's wife, Harriet Egerton, provided much of the early funding for the school. Egerton would go on to devote most of the rest of his life to the school, of which he was the first headmaster. A boarding house at Bloxham School is named after the school's founder and Egerton's portrait hangs in the school dining hall.

Egerton's political patron was William Ewart Gladstone, who said of Egerton: "England, perhaps, owes as much to him in the matter of religious education as any man."

== Cricket ==
He played cricket for Winchester in 1849 and 1850, appearing each year against Harrow and Eton and being on the losing side every time. In the four matches, he scored 11 runs in seven completed innings, took one wicket and made a catch.

== Personal life ==
At the time of founding Bloxham, Egerton was in love with his cousin, Harriet Gould, daughter of his uncle Nathaniel Gould of Tavistock Square. The Goulds were of considerable wealth and Egerton's uncle questioned his prospects. Thanks to the strong personal support of Bishop Wilberforce, Egerton and Harriet were eventually permitted to marry on 4 November 1862. Their daughter, Ellen, married Dr Frank Hinde, son of Major-General Hinde CB, on 28 October 1890.

== See also ==
- Bloxham School
- Oxford Movement
