= Dimitry Zvegintzov =

Dimitry Dimitrievitch Zvegintzov
- Димитрий Димитриевич Звегинцов
- Born: 25 January 1911; Russia
- Died: 13 April 1984 (aged 72–73); Glasbury on Wye, Wales
- Burial place: Garden of Remembrance, Hereford Crematorium
- Spouse: Hon. Rachel Kathleen Bailey
- Military career
- Allegiance: United Kingdom
- Branch: British Army
- Service years: 1935–1965
- Rank: Brigadier
- Nickname: Zog
- Unit: Border Regiment
- Conflicts: Second World War
- Awards: Commander of the Order of the British Empire; Officer of the Order of Saint John

Brigadier Dimitry Dimitrievitch Zvegintzov (Russian: Димитрий Димитриевич Звегинцов) CBE (25 January 1911 – 23 April 1984) was a senior British Army officer.

== Biography ==
Zvegintzov was born in Russia into an aristocratic family, the son of Colonel Dimitry Ivanovitch Zvegintzov (1880–1967) and Princess Maria Obolensky (1882–1947), the daughter of Ivan Mikhailovich Obolensky. During the Russian Revolution of 1917, his family moved to England, fearing the repercussions of the Bolshevik takeover. He was subsequently educated at Bloxham School, where he was nicknamed "Zog", and served as drum major in the Officers' Training Corps band, with the rank of Cadet Serjeant.

On 17 September 1931, Zvegintzov, then working as a clerk and living in Barons Court, London, became a naturalised British subject, having been granted a Certificate of Naturalization, and sworn the Oath of Allegiance. He joined the Supplementary Reserve of Officers in May 1933, and 1 February 1935 was commissioned as a second lieutenant in the Border Regiment, receiving promotion to lieutenant on 1 February 1938.

He saw service during the Second World War, being promoted to captain on 1 February 1943, and having the war substantive rank of major by the end of the conflict.

He remained in the army post-war, being promoted to major on 25 January 1947. and was made an Officer of the Order of the British Empire on 1 January 1949. On 1 July 1952 he was brevetted as a lieutenant-colonel, eventually being promoted to that rank on 5 April 1955. He was promoted again, to colonel, on 12 September 1957, and to brigadier on 12 September 1961.

Zvegintzov was made a Commander of the Order of the British Empire on 1 January 1963, and eventually retired from the army on 2 February 1965. In April 1968 he was made an Officer of the Order of Saint John.

Zvegintzov died on 23 April 1984 at his home in Glasbury on Wye, Wales. His funeral was held at All Saints Church, Glasbury on Wye, and he was cremated on the 27th at Hereford Crematorium.

== Personal life ==
Zvegintzov married the Honourable Rachel Kathleen Bailey, granddaughter of Joseph Bailey, 1st Baron Glanusk, on 20 April 1940. They had three children.

His younger brother Ivan was killed in North Africa on 28 December 1941 while serving as a second lieutenant in the 3rd County of London Yeomanry. He is commemorated on the Alamein Memorial.
