= European Central Inland Transport Organization =

United Nations agency

- Abbreviation: ECITO, OECTI
- Formation: 27 September 1945; 79 years ago
- Type: United Nations specialised agency
- Legal status: Inactive
- Headquarters: London, United Kingdom
- Head: Director-General; C H Alexandrowicz
- Parent organization: United Nations

The European Central Inland Transport Organization (ECITOP) was a short-lived United Nations agency founded in the immediate aftermath of the Second World War to:

provide for the co-ordination both in the movement of traffic and in the allocation of transport equipment and material with a view to ensuring the best possible movement of supplies both for military forces and the civil population and the speedy repatriation of displaced persons, and also with a view to creating conditions in which the normal movement of traffic can be more rapidly resumed

upon both "the liberation of the territories of the United Nations" and "the occupation of the territories of the enemy" in Europe.

The organization was the result of the October 1944 Conference on European Inland Transport in London. The conference was attended by delegations representing Belgium, Czechoslovakia, France, Greece, Luxembourg, Poland, the Netherlands, Norway, USSR, UK, USA and Yugoslavia (or their governments-in-exile) together with observers from Denmark, Supreme Headquarters Allied Expeditionary Force (SHAEF), those from Field Marshal Sir Harold Alexander, Supreme Allied Commander, Mediterranean (SACMED), and the United Nations Relief and Rehabilitation Administration (UNRRA), and was chaired by Lord Noel-Baker.

The first Director-General was Charles Henry Alexandrowicz, with Major-General Rex Hewer as Deputy Director-General.

The official French name of ECITOP was Organisation d'Europe centrale pour les transports intérieurs.

ECITOP ceased operations in 1947 when its activities were absorbed by the new Economic Commission for Europe, Inland Transport Committee, and was wound up by 1954. The organization's archives are held by the United Nations Archives in Geneva.
