= Wilfred Ellershaw =

British Army general

Brigadier-General Wilfred Ellershaw
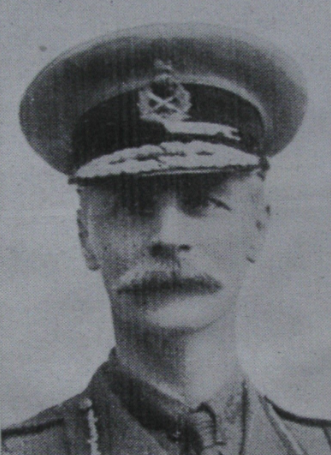
- Born: 1871
- Died: 5 June 1916 (aged 44–45); HMS Hampshire, west of Orkney, Scotland
- Military career
- Allegiance: United Kingdom
- Branch: British Army
- Service years: 1892–1916
- Rank: Brigadier-General
- Unit: Royal Artillery
- Commands: 113th Battery, Royal Field Artillery
- Conflicts: First World War
- Awards: Mentioned in Despatches; Order of Saint Stanislaus, 1st Class (Russia)

Brigadier-General Wilfred Ellershaw (1871 – 5 June 1916) was a British Army officer who served as aide-de-camp to Lord Kitchener.

== Early life and family ==
Ellershaw was the son of Reverend John Ellershaw. He was educated at Bloxham School in Oxfordshire. He married Katherine Ingles, daughter of Rear-Admiral John Ingles and Catherine Sophia Glennie, on 22 June 1899.

== Military career ==
Ellershaw was commissioned into the Royal Artillery. Between 1899 and 1906 he was an instructor at the Royal Military Academy, Sandhurst. He subsequently rose to the rank of brigadier-general. During the First World War he served as special service officer at the War Office and became the aide-de-camp to the British field marshal, Lord Kitchener.

Ellershaw died alongside Kitchener on 5 June 1916 when his ship, HMS Hampshire, struck a mine laid by German U-boat U-75 shortly after leaving Scapa Flow.

Ellershaw is commemorated on the Hollybrook Memorial of Hollybrook Cemetery, located in Shirley, Southampton.
