= Sergei Hackel =

British Russian Orthodox theologian (1931 – 2005)

Archpriest Sergei Alekseyevich Hackel (alternate spelling Gakkel, Russian: Сергей Алексеевич Гаккель; 24 August 1931 – 9 February 2005) was a British Russian Orthodox priest, theologian, academic and broadcaster, who was the senior priest in Britain of the Russian Orthodox Diocese of Sourozh.

Hackel was born in Berlin. His family had once owned a large house in Saint Petersburg opposite the Winter Palace, and his parents were part of a circle of intellectuals who moved to Germany following the 1917 revolution.

He was educated at the Anglo-Catholic Bloxham School, where his mother worked as domestic staff in order to pay the school fees. He studied Modern Languages at Lincoln College, Oxford before training for ordination. His first parish was in Lewes and while in this position he lectured at the European Studies School at Sussex University. He taught Russian at the university for 25 years.

Hackel was active in the Fellowship of Saint Alban and Saint Sergius and was recognised as one of the strongest proponents of ecumenism, especially between the Church of England and the Orthodox Church. He represented the Russian Orthodox Diocese of Sourozh in the British Council of Churches and was active in Continental Europe and the World Council of Churches. For the last 30 years of his life he was editor of the ecumenical Orthodox journal Sobornost. From 1984 until his death he worked for the BBC World Service as the weekly editor of Russian religious broadcasts, and was closely involved in the work of the Council of Christians and Jews.

== Publications ==
- Pearl of Great Price: The Life of Mother Maria Skobtsova, 1891–1945 (1965) (translated into german by Annemarie Böll as "Die größere Liebe")
- The Poet and the Revolution: Alexander Blok's "The Twelve" (1975)
- The Orthodox Church (Living Religions) (1975)
- Lev Gillet: A Monk of the Eastern Church (1999) - editor
- The Byzantine Saint (2001) - editor
