= Lionel Grimston =

Lionel Grimston CIE OBE VD
- Born: 18 April 1868
- Died: 12 November 1943 (aged 75)
- Allegiance: United Kingdom
- Branch: (British Raj) British Indian Army
- Rank: Colonel
- Commands: 6th Assam Valley Light Horse
- Conflicts: First World War
- Awards: Companion of the Order of the Indian Empire; Officer of the Order of the British Empire; Volunteer Officers' Decoration

Colonel Lionel Augustus Grimston CIE OBE VD (18 April 1869 – 12 November 1943) was an Indian Defence Force officer.

== Life ==
He was the son of Colonel Oswald J. A. Grimston and was educated at Bloxham School and the United Services College.

He was commissioned into the Indian Volunteers in December 1893 and served with the 6th Assam Valley Light Horse of the Auxiliary Force, India.

Grimston was promoted lieutenant colonel in February 1913 and commanded the Assam Light Horse during the First World War from 1 April 1916. He retired in 1921.

He was invested as an Officer of the Order of the British Empire (Military Division) in recognition of distinguished services rendered in India in connection with the War in the London Gazette 12 September 1919. He had already received the Volunteer Officers' Decoration.

His name was brought to the notice of the Secretary of State for War for valuable services rendered in India in connection with the War.

On 1 January 1921 was invested as a Companion of the Order of the Indian Empire.

He returned to England upon retirement and lived in Willingdon, East Sussex.
