= George Miles (organist) =

English organist and organ teacher

George Miles FRCO
- Birth name: George Theophilus Miles
- Born: 23 February 1913; England
- Died: 26 March 1988 (aged 75); Birmingham, England
- Genres: Classical
- Occupation(s): Organist, music educator
- Instrument: Organ
- Years active: 1935–1988
- Spouse: Margarete Böhm

George Theophilus Miles FRCO (23 February 1913 – 26 March 1988) was an English organist and organ teacher based in Birmingham.

== Education ==
He was educated at King's School, Canterbury and the Royal College of Music from 1931 to 1935, where he studied with George Thalben-Ball.

He studied with Karl Straube at the Kirchenmusikalisches Institut in Leipzig. He applied to study with Straube for his main study, Organ; but also composition under the Austrian composer Johann Nepomuk David and piano under Prof Robert Teichmueller, who was a pupil of Reinecke and taught Karg-Elert and others. Miles signed up on 28 September 1935. He remained in Germany for a few years, as he is documented living in Mittelweg, Hamburg a year or so later and did some translating work in an advisory capacity for C.F.Peters.

== Career ==
From the 1930s, through recitals and in particular broadcasts, he was virtually alone in representing the continental style of organ playing in Britain, especially in Bach.

He was consulted by Ralph Downes on the design of the new organ for the Royal Festival Hall.

Soon after World War II he became established as a devoted and respected teacher through his hundreds of pupils from Birmingham University and the Birmingham School of Music.

He was organist at St. Peter's Church, Harborne from 1946 to 1988.

== Personal life ==
He was born on 23 February 1913 to Canon Joseph Henry Miles (1856 - 1935) (Curate of Castlerea 1882 - 1883, Canon of Christ Church Cathedral, Dublin 1883 - 1896, Rector of Pangbourne 1896 - 1913, Curate of West Teignmouth 1918 - 1919, Benenden 1919-1922, Chaplain of Faversham Almshouses 1922 - 1930) and Helen J Kolb in Pangbourne, Berkshire. His half brother Harry Godfrey Massy-Miles died in the First World War.

He married Margarete Böhm. They had one son, George Christopher Miles (1942 – 1994).

He died in Birmingham on 26 March 1988.
