= Thomas Sanderson-Wells =

British surgeon (1871–1958)

Thomas Sanderson-Wells MBE MD FRCS
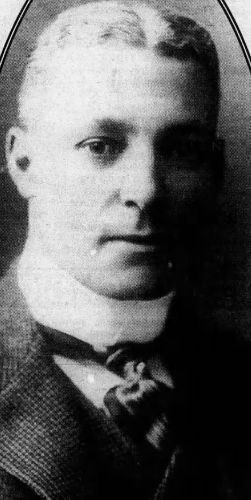
- Born: Thomas Henry Wells; 12 March 1871; Banbury
- Died: 1 October 1958 (aged 87); Wells, Somerset, England
- Military career
- Allegiance: United Kingdom
- Branch: British Army
- Rank: Captain
- Conflicts: First World War
- Awards: Member of the Order of the British Empire

Thomas Henry Sanderson-Wells MBE (12 March 1871 – 1 October 1958) was a British surgeon and nutrition writer.

== Biography ==
Born Thomas Henry Wells in Banbury, Sanderson-Wells was educated at Bloxham School, before receiving his clinical training at Middlesex Hospital. He qualified as a member of the Royal College of Surgeons and a member of the Royal College of Physicians in 1895. He served as a civil surgeon with the South African Field Force in 1901 during the Second Boer War, before settling in Weymouth. There he was appointed surgeon to the Princess Christian Hospital for Women and Children. Sanderson-Wells proceeded to study for his Bachelor of Medicine degree in London. During the First World War, Sanderson-Wells served as an officer in the Royal Army Medical Corps, also working in Gaza with the Red Cross. He was elected into the Fellowship of the Royal College of Surgeons in 1918. He was awarded an MBE in 1920 in recognition for his services in connection with work at military hospitals in the United Kingdom during the war.

Sanderon-Wells subsequently continued to work at Weymouth District Hospital until an old injury (his leg was badly burnt during experimental x-ray research early in his career) forced him to retire in 1925 from practicing surgery. He was made an honorary consulting surgeon at the hospital and went on to become its vice-president. He married Agnes Laurie in 1906 and she died in 1950.

== Nutrition ==
Sanderson-Wells developed a lifelong study of nutrition. In 1905, he gave an address to the British Medical Association on substitute feeding in infants. Two prizes to his memory have been established at the University of London, both of which recognise Sanderson-Wells' work in nutrition.

=== Organic food ===
Sanderson-Wells was a founding member of the Soil Association and chairman of the Food Education Society. He advocated for organic farming and collaborated with Jorian Jenks. He took interest in organic food and its relationship to human health.

Sanderson-Wells recommended a diet that he termed the "Sun diet". The diet was built on natural farmhouse foods which he claimed produced robust and strong men. He commented that "nature's foods are toothsome and appetising. Even when rough quality and sparse in quantity they supported vigorous populations in this country".

== Death ==
He died without children in Wells, Somerset in 1958. He is buried at the churchyard at Church of St Matthew, Wookey.

== Selected publications ==
- Sun Diet or Live Food for Live Britons. London: John Bale, Sons & Curnow Ltd. 1939.
