= 21st Horse (Central India Horse) =

Indian Army unit

The Central India Horse
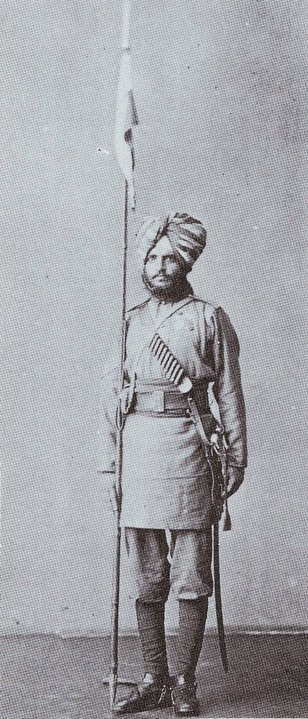
- A Daffadar of the 1st Central India Horse in 1886
- Active: 1857 – present
- Country: India
- Allegiance: British India; India
- Branch: British Indian Army; Indian Army
- Type: Cavalry
- Size: Regiment
- Part of: Indian Army Armoured Corps
- Mottos: भाग्य वीर पक्ष धर्म; Bhagya Veer Paksha Dharma (Fortune favours the brave)
- Engagements: Indian Rebellion of 1857; Second Afghan War; Great War; Second World War; Indo-Pakistani War of 1947–1948; Indo-Pakistani War of 1965; Indo-Pakistani War of 1971
- Battle honours: Kandahar, 1880; Afghanistan, 1879-80; Punjab Frontier; Somme, 1916; Morval; Cambrai, 1917; France and Flanders, 1914-18; Megiddo; Sharon; Damascus; Palestine, 1918; Keren-Asmara Road; Keren; Abyssinia, 1940-41; Relief of Tobruk, 1941; North Africa, 1940-43; Gothic Line; Italy, 1943-45; Greece, 1944-45; Rajaori; Jammu and Kashmir 1947-48; Burki; Punjab, 1965

Commanders
- Colonel of the Regiment: Lieutenant General Rajesh Pushkar

Insignia
- Abbreviation: C.I.H.

The Central India Horse (formerly the 21st King George V's Own Horse, also known as Beatson's Horse) was a regular cavalry regiment of the British Indian Army and is presently part of the Indian Army Armoured Corps.

== Formation ==
The regiment was raised as two irregular cavalry regiments at the outset of the Indian Rebellion of 1857. The first regiment was formed by Captain Henry Otway Mayne on 15 December 1857 and was known initially as Mayne's Horse. Captain Mayne who was from the 6th Madras Light Cavalry and a Brigade Major of the Hyderabad Contingent, raised his regiment with troops from Gwalior Contingent, Malwa Contingent Cavalry and Bhopal Contingent.

The second regiment was known as Beatson's Horse. It was raised between February and September 1858 in Hyderabad by Lieutenant Colonel (later Major-General) William Ferguson Beatson, originally of the Bengal Native Infantry. The troops were from Hyderabad.

They were based at the towns of Augur in Western Malwa and Goona in the state of Gwalior in central India. In 1860, Mayne's Horse was renamed the 1st Regiment, Central India Horse, and Beatson's Horse was renamed the 2nd Regiment, Central India Horse. Mayne's Horse and Beatson's Horse joined to form the Central India Horse in 1860. They were joined by 200 men of the Meade's Horse in 1861.

The Commandant of the Central India Horse then held political charge of the Western Malwa Agency, which included the States of Jaora, Ratlam, Sitamau and Sailana, with the Malwa districts of Gwalior, Indore, Jhalawar, Dewas, and Tonk. In December 1895, control of the Agency was transferred from the charge of the Commandant of the Central India Horse to that of an officer of the Indian Political Department, and the head-quarters of the Agency were removed from Agar to Neemuch.

In 1860, the officer commanding the Central India Horse was made the British political officer for the small states of Raghugarh, Khaniadhana (after 1888), Paron, Garha, Umri and Bhadaura, which were made a separate charge from that of the Resident of Gwalior. This arrangement was abolished in 1896, when these states were again placed under the resident, with the officer commanding at Guna continuing to act as ex-officio assistant to the Resident, with very limited powers.

== Reorganisation ==
During the Kitchener reorganisation of the Indian Army of 1903, the 1st Regiment became the 38th Regiment Central India Horse, and the 2nd regiment became the 39th Regiment Central India Horse. In 1906, the regiments were renamed the 38th and 39th Prince of Wales's Own Central India Horse, and in 1910 the 38th and 39th King George's Own Central India Horse. The composition of the regiment was Punjabi Musalmans, Sikhs and Jats.

== Operations ==
=== Indian Uprising of 1857 ===
Both regiments which were raised as a consequence of the First War of Independence saw action in Central India in pursuit of Tantia Tope after the recapture of Gwalior.

=== Second Anglo-Afghan War ===
The two regiments were part of the Kabul-Kandahar Field Force under its Commander-in-Chief, Lieutenant-General Sir Frederick Roberts. It was part of the Cavalry Brigade led by Brigadier-general Hugh Gough. The regiment was awarded the battle honours ‘Kandahar,1880’ and ‘Afghanistan, 1879-80’.

=== Punjab Frontier ===
In 1897, both regiments were involved in operations in the North West Indian Frontier with Afghanistan. The regiments were also deployed in Kurram Valley.

=== Persia ===
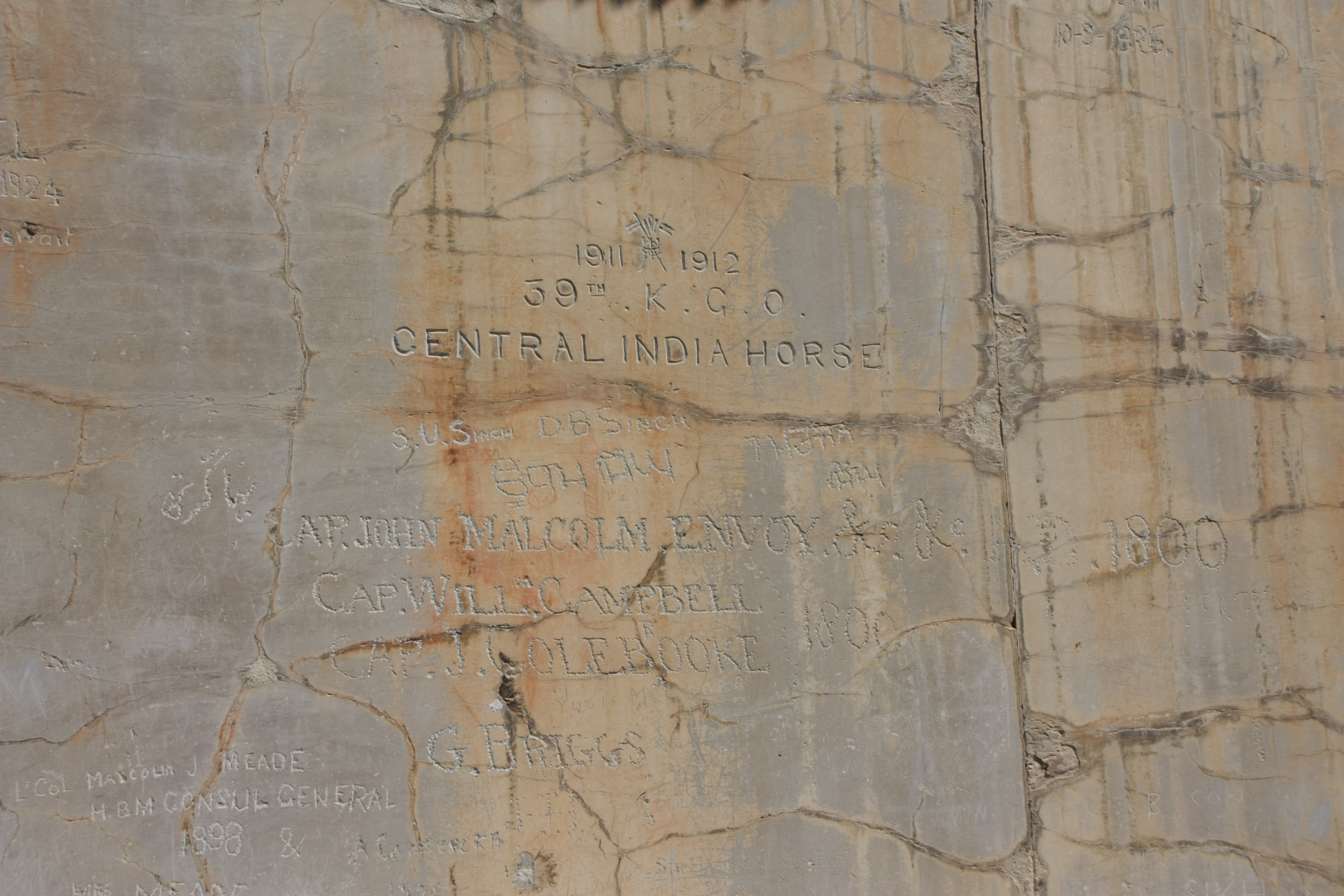
Graffito at the Gate of all Nations, Persepolis: "1911-1912, 39th K[ing] G[eorge's] O[wn] Central India Horse"

In October 1911, the British Government sent a small force of troops to Persia consisting of three and half squadron of 39th King George's Own Central India Horse and sixty men of the 7th Rajputs to support and protect its trade in Bushire, Shiraz and Ispahan. The regiment lost one officer and several men in the many brushes with Kashguli tribesmen. They left back for India in April 1913.

=== World War I ===
During the Great War the 38th King George's Own Central India Horse was part of the 5th (Mhow) Cavalry Brigade in the 2nd Indian Cavalry Division.The brigade consisted of the 6th (Inniskilling) Dragoons, 2nd Lancers (Gardner's Horse), 38th King George's Own Central India Horse and Signal Troop. The regiment lost many men in the Battle of Cambrai, but were noted for their bravery in extricating the 2nd Lancers. Later in 1918 the 38th King George's Own Central India Horse joined the 10th Cavalry Brigade, in the 4th Cavalry Division for the Sinai and Palestine Campaign. They returned to India in February 1921.

The 39th King George's Own Central India Horse remained in India during the war, stationed in Poona.

== Amalgamation ==
In 1921, the two regiments were amalgamated at Quetta into the 38th/39th Cavalry, which was renamed the 38th/39th King George's Own Light Cavalry in 1922, The Central India Horse (21st King George's Own Horse) in 1923, and The Central India Horse (21st King George V's Own Horse) in 1937. The horses were replaced by armoured fighting vehicles in 1939.

== Second World War ==
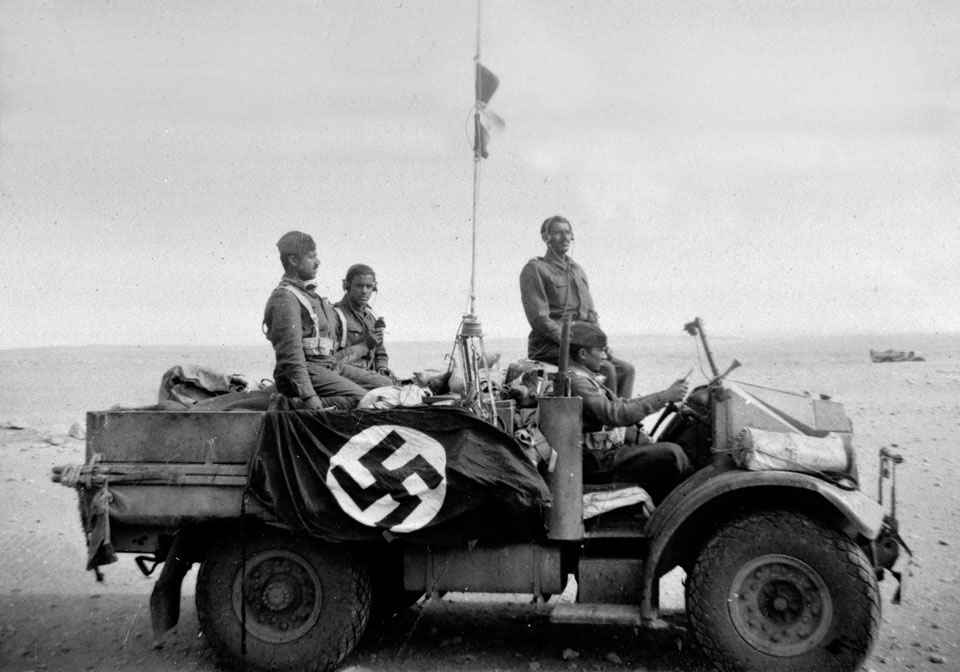
Central India Horse with captured German flag after re-occupation of Benghazi, December 1941.

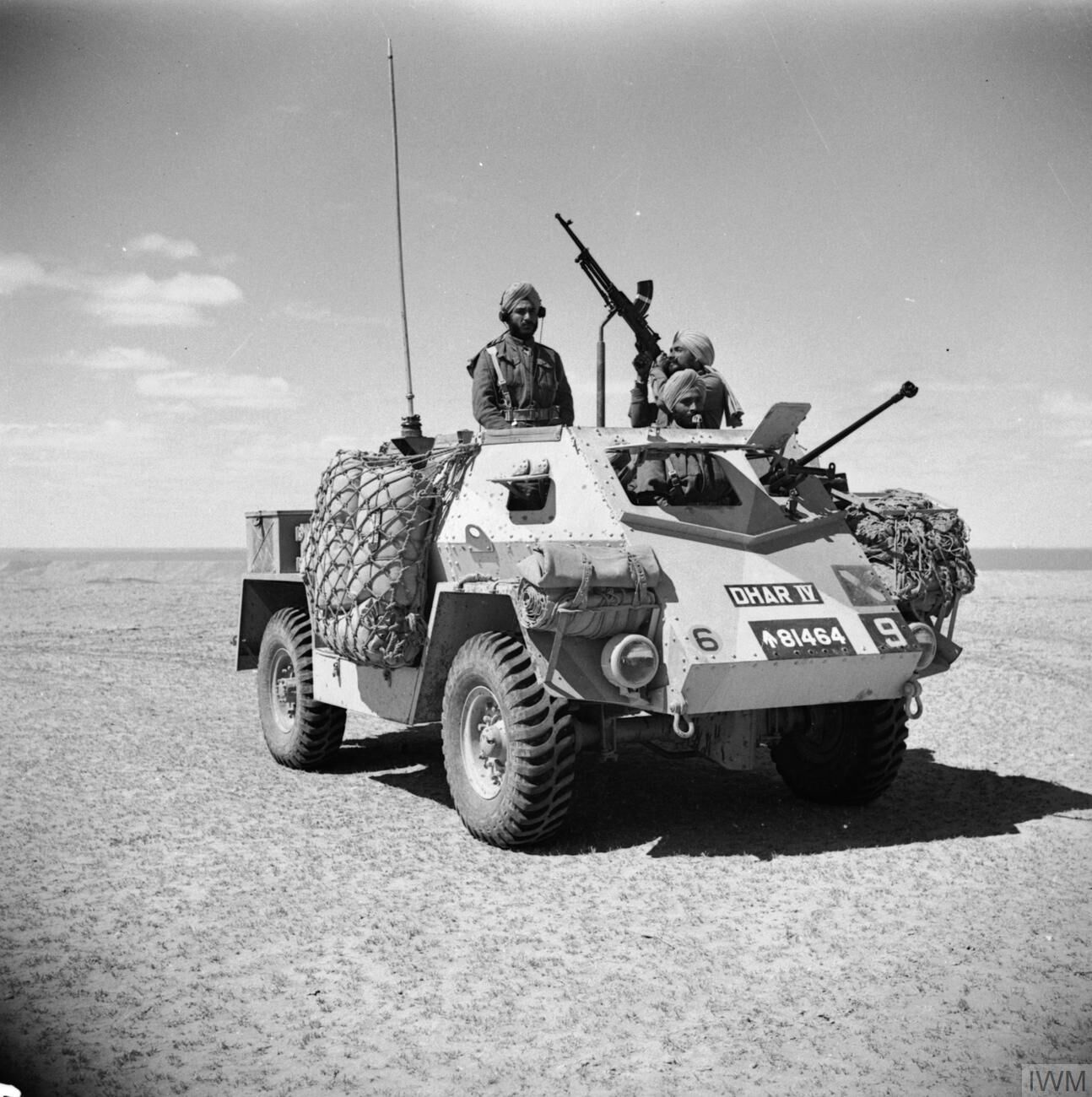
Indian Pattern Carrier Mk IIA named 'Dhar IV' of the type used by the Central India Horse, North Africa, April 1942.

During the Second World War, the Central India Horse (equipped with Light Tanks and Indian Pattern Carriers) was the divisional reconnaissance regiment for the 4th Indian Division. While attached to the 4th Indian Division they were involved in the Western Desert Campaign, the East African Campaign, the Tunisia Campaign and the Italian Campaign.

It was during the Italian Campaign that two members of the Regiment were posthumously awarded the George Cross: Ditto Ram and St. John Graham Young attached from the Royal Tank Regiment. Young had been leading a night patrol on 23 July 1944, when he and his men found themselves in any enemy minefield. He received the full force of a mine explosion, severely injuring both legs. Despite his wounds, his encouragement enabled the majority of his men to reach safety. One of them, Sowar Ditto Ram, was also posthumously awarded the GC for his actions in the same incident.

=== Bombay 'mutiny' ===
In 1940, the Central India Horse was posted to Egypt. While awaiting embarkation the train carrying the regiment was kept in a siding for about twenty-four hours. During this delay four members of a radical political organization – the Kirti Lehar were able to persuade two-thirds of the Sikh squadron of the regiment to refuse overseas service. The remainder of the regiment embarked for North Africa and Italy where it served with distinction. The 'mutineers' were court-martialed.

=== Cavalry charge at Toungoo ===
On March 20, 1942 Captain Arthur Sandeman of the Central India Horse was on secondment to the Burma Frontier Force - leading a mounted infantry column. Near Toungoo airfield in central Burma the 60-man mounted patrol mistook Japanese troops for Chinese ones and closed with them before realizing their mistake. Most of the patrol (including Sandeman) were killed in what was probably the last cavalry charge by a force under the command of the British crown.

== Independence ==
Upon India's independence, the Central India Horse (21st King George V's Own Horse) was allocated to India, although a Muslim Punjabi squadron was transferred to the 19th King George V's Own Lancers in exchange for its Jat squadron. When India became a republic in 1950, the regiment was renamed The Central India Horse, which is one of the decorated regiments of the Indian Army. The Central India Horse is now a tank regiment of the Indian Army's XXI Corps (Southern Command).

Indo-Pakistani War of 1947–1948

‘A’ Squadron of the Central India Horse took part in the March–April 1948 Indian offensive along with the three brigades (50th Parachute, 19th Infantry and 20th Infantry) and advanced along the Naoshera-Rajauri road and recaptured Janghar (March 17, 1948), then changed direction and occupied Rajauri (April 12, 1948). It also took part in the second attempt to capture Poonch in October–November 1948. A light tank squadron of Central India Horse along with the 5th and 19th Infantry Brigades carried out the main attack between November 8 and 19 1948 from the Rajauri area to capture Pooch.

Indo-Pakistani War of 1965

The regiment was part of the 7 Infantry Division under XI Corps. It was tasked to advance along the Khalra-Burki axis and capture the adjacent bridge over the Ichhogil canal and Bedian. The attack was partially successful and following the Battle of Burki, Burki and Jahman villages were captured. The regiment lost 6 tanks during this operation. Lt Col SC Joshi, commanding officer of the regiment was killed while negotiating an enemy minefield.

Indo-Pakistani War of 1971

The regiment was part of 26 Infantry Division and equipped with T-55 tanks. A detachment of the regiment was part of 3 Independent Armoured Brigade. Both were under XV Corps.

== Awards and honours ==
Prominent winners of gallantry awards include:

Early years

- Companion of the Most Eminent Order of the Indian Empire : Major Francis Henry Rutherford Drummond, 2nd Regiment of Central India Horse; and Rissaldar Major Baha-ud-din Khan, Sardar Bahadur, 1st Regiment of Central India Horse

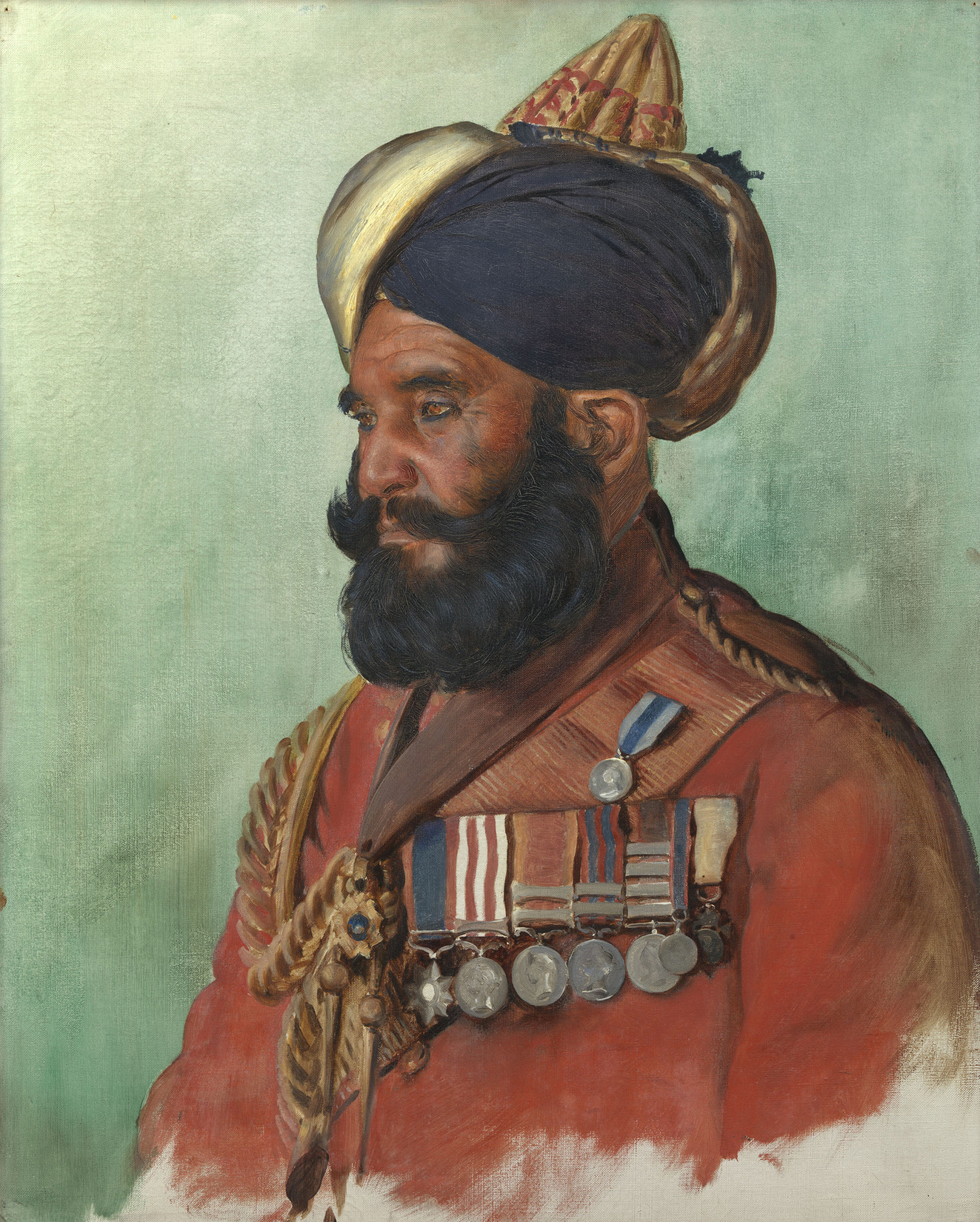
Painting of Risaldar-Major Baha-Ud-Din Khan, Sirdar Bahadur, 1st Central India Horse by Rudolf Swoboda. Baha-Ud-Din Khan served on the North-West Frontier, in the Indian Rebellion and in the China and Afghan Wars. In 1884, he was appointed Risaldar-Major, the senior Indian officer and adviser to the British commander of his regiment. He was made Aide-de-Camp to the Viceroy in 1895.

- Commander of the Royal Victorian Order : Colonel Lionel Herbert

Imperial Visit to India, 1911

The following were honoured during the Imperial Visit of King George V to India

- Companion of the Order of the Indian Empire : Captain Rudolph Edward Trower Hogg
- Order of British India, 1st Class, with the title of " Sardar Bahadur”: Risaldar Major Malik Ghulam Muhammad Khan

Persia

- Companion of the Most Distinguished Order of St Michael and St George : Lieutenant-Colonel James Archibald Douglas
- Order of the Lion and the Sun, 3rd Class : Captain Edward Thomas Ruscombe Wickham

1917 Birthday Honours

- Companion of the Order of the Indian Empire : Lieutenant-Colonel Alexander Hierom Ogilvy Spence

World War I

- Battle honours : Somme 1916, Cambrai 1917, Morval, France and Flanders 1914-18, Megiddo, Sharon, Damascus, and Palestine 1918.
- Commander of the Most Excellent Order of the British Empire Captain and Brevet Major Charles Offley Harvey, M.V.O., M.C., 38th King George's Own Central India Horse
- Companion of the Most Excellent Order of the British Empire : Brevet Lieutenant-Colonel Hugh Huntingdon Stable
- Indian Order of Merit : Risaldar Dilawar Khan, Ressaidar Jawand Singh, Lance Daffadar Faiz Muhammad Khan, Ressaidar Lihaz Gul Khan, Jemadar Mirzaman Khan, Ressaidar Dyal Singh, RessaidarKertar Singh, Sowar Dalip Singh, Sowar Indar Singh.
- Military Cross: Risaldar Kamaluddin Khan
- Order of British India: Risaldar Major Amar Singh, Risaldar Dilawar Khan, Risaldar Kamaluddin Khan, Ressaidar Mohan Singh
- Indian Distinguished Service Medal : 38th King George's Own Central India Horse – 29 medals, 39th King George's Own Central India Horse – 4 medals.
- Medal of the Order of the British Empire for Meritorious Service : Dafadar Lohrasab Khan
- Indian Meritorious Service Medals: 38th King George's Own Central India Horse – 58 medals, 39th King George's Own Central India Horse – 12 medals.
- Order of Saint Anna, 3rd Class : Lieutenant-Colonel Alfred Percy Browne
- Medaille d'Honneur avec Glaives "en Argent" : Private Frederick Mason
- Croix de guerre (Belgium): Kot Dafadar Shawali Khan.

World War II

- Battle honours : Keren-Asmara Road, Keren, Abyssinia 1940-41, Relief of Tobruk 1941, North Africa 1940-43, Gothic Line, Italy 1943-45, Greece 1944-45
- George Cross : Sowar Ditto Ram and Lieutenant St. John Graham Young
- The Indian Order of Merit (Second Class) : Risaldar Malik Mohammed Allahdad Khan, Lance-Daffadar Ram Bhaj
- Military Cross : Captain D.H.G.M. Doyne Ditmas, Captain K Zorawar Singh
- Military Medal : Lance-Daffadar Ranbir Singh
- Indian Distinguished Service Medal : Lance Daffadar Kapur Singh, Sowar Yad Ram, Risaldar Ali Musa Khan, Risaldar Sis Ram, Jemadar Mohammed Bahadur Khan, Daffadar Janak Singh, Lance-Daffadar Ram Bhaj, Lance-Daffadar Khuda Baksh, Lance-Daffadar Attar Singh
- Medal of the Order of the British Empire for Meritorious Service : Sowar Chabbila Ram
- Mentioned in Despatches : 19

Indo-Pakistani War of 1947–1948

- Battle honours : Rajaori, Jammu and Kashmir 1947-48,
- Maha Vir Chakra : Captain Arvind Nilkhanth Jatar
- Vir Chakra : Major Karam Singh, Lieutenant Satish Chandra Joshi, Jemadar Janak Singh, Lance Daffadar Waryam Singh, Sowar Roop Chand
- Mentioned in Despatches : 10

Indo-Pakistani War of 1965

- Battle honours : Burki, Punjab 1965
- Vir Chakra : Lt Col Satish Chandra Joshi, Naib Risaldar Jagdish Singh
- Sena Medal : Dafadar Ishwar Singh, Lance Daffadar Uttam Singh
- Mentioned in Despatches : 2

Presentation of Guidon

The regiment was presented the a guidon by the then President of India, Giani Zail Singh on 8 January 1983.

== Notable personnel ==
- General James Travers : Commanded the regiment in 1860 and was recipient of Victoria Cross.
- General Sir Henry Dermot Daly : Commanded the regiment in 1861 and was the Governor General of India's Agent in Central India between 1870 and 1881. He also raised the Daly's Horse.
- General Sir Dighton Macnaghten Probyn : Commanded the regiment between 1868 and 1870, recipient of Victoria Cross and after whom the 5th King Edward's Own Probyn's Horse and Probynabad are named.
- General Sir John Watson : Commanded the regiment in 1871 and was recipient of Victoria Cross.
- General Sir Samuel James Browne : Recipient of the Victoria Cross, commanded the regiment and raised 22nd Sam Browne's Cavalry

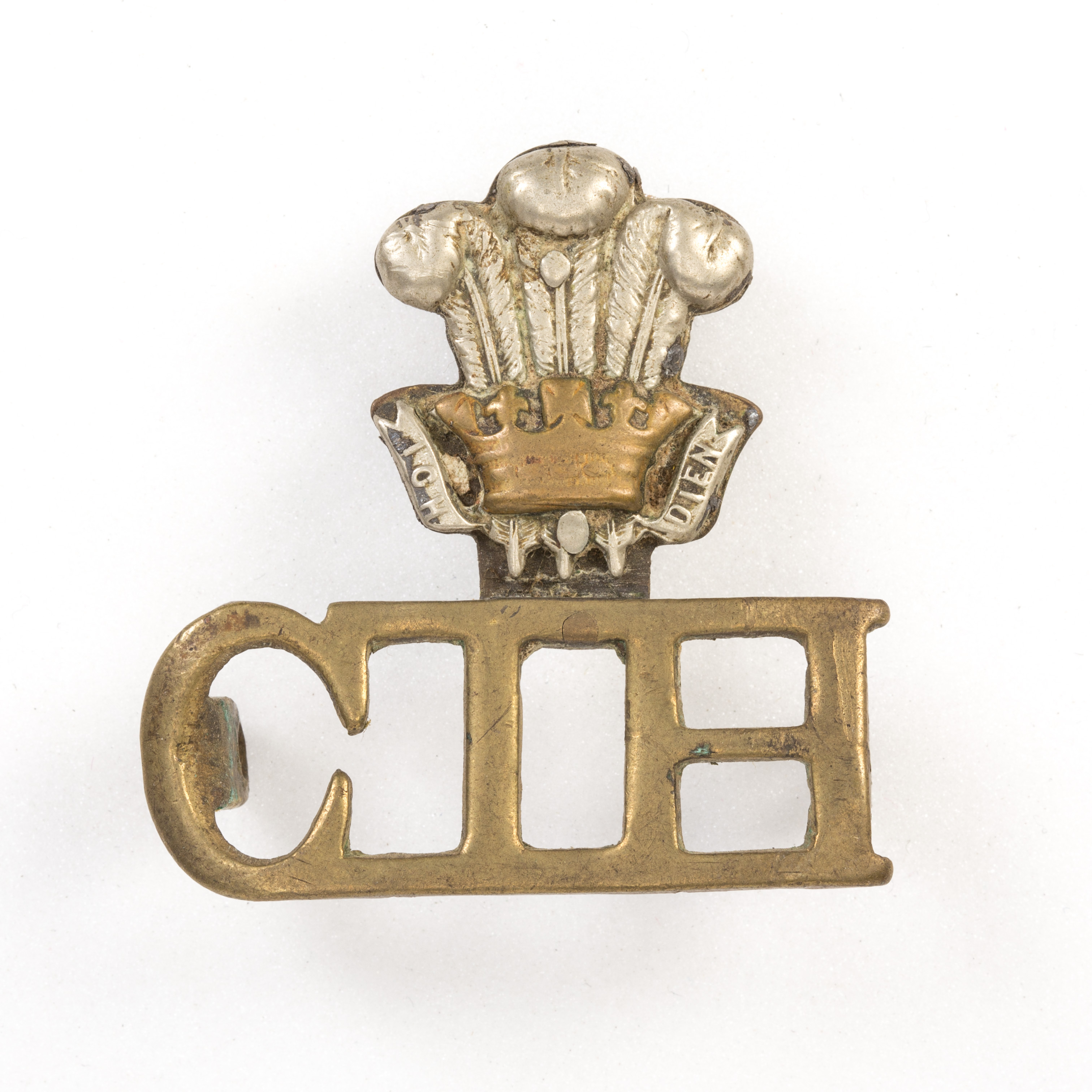
Shoulder badge of the Central India Horse (21st King George V's Own Horse) before 1947: shoulder title letters CIH below the Welsh Ich Dien symbol with feathers and coronet

- General Sir Montagu Gilbert Gerard
- Sir Neville Francis Fitzgerald Chamberlain : served in the regiment in 1876 and is credited with having invented the game of snooker while serving in Jubbulpore (Jabalpur), India, in 1875.
- Jaswant Singh : Former Cabinet Minister of External Affairs, Finance and Defence.
- Lieutenant General Misbah Mayadas, PVSM : Deputy Director of Military Operations; Director General of Weapons and Equipment; and Director General of Military Training
- Lieutenant General Surinder Kumar Jetley, PVSM, AVSM, SM : Deputy Chief of the Army Staff (Training and Coordination)
- Lieutenant General Bhupinder Singh Thakur PVSM, AVSM : Vice Chief of the Army Staff, January - September 2005
- Lieutenant General Dewan Rabindranath Soni, PVSM, VSM : General Officer-Commanding-in-Chief (GOC-in-C), Southern Command and General Officer Commanding-in-Chief of the Army Training Command (ARTRAC).
- Lieutenant General Paramjit Singh Minhas : General Officer-Commanding XII Corps
- Major General K Zorawar Singh, MC

== Uniforms and insignia ==
The original uniforms were modelled upon that of the Guides. The men wore khaki, the facings being maroon, a blue Ludhiana pagri, white breeches, scarlet lungi and black puttees.

The Regimental insignia consists of crossed lances with pennons with the letters CIH inscribed between the crossing of the lances mounted with the crown. The crown was replaced with the Ashoka Lion Capital.
