= Eustace Maude, 7th Viscount Hawarden =

British Army officer, peer and colonial official

Major Eustace Wyndham Maude, 7th Viscount Hawarden JP (20 September 1877 – 6 April 1958) was a British Army officer, peer and colonial official.

Maude was the son of Ludlow Eustace Maude and Clara Louisa Madden, and the great-grandson of Cornwallis Maude, 1st Viscount Hawarden. He was educated at Bloxham School and the Royal Military College, Sandhurst. He was commissioned into the 3rd Battalion, Hampshire Regiment on 4 April 1900. He was promoted to major in 1910 while serving with the Queen's Royal Regiment (West Surrey) in Egypt. He succeeded to the title Viscount Hawarden on 26 August 1914. It was due to the battlefield death of his cousin, Lt. Robert Cornwallis Maude, at Mons. He saw active service in the First World War, during which he was mentioned in dispatches. He was subsequently a provincial governor in Anglo-Egyptian Sudan. He held the office of Justice of the Peace.

He married Marion Wright, daughter of Albert Leslie Wright of Butterley Hall and Margaretta Agnes Plumptre, on 17 November 1920. Together they had three children.

Peerage of Ireland
Preceded by Robert Cornwallis Maude	Viscount Hawarden; 1914–1958	Succeeded by Robert Leslie Eustace Maude
