= Hollybrook Cemetery =

Cemetery in Southampton, Hampshire, England

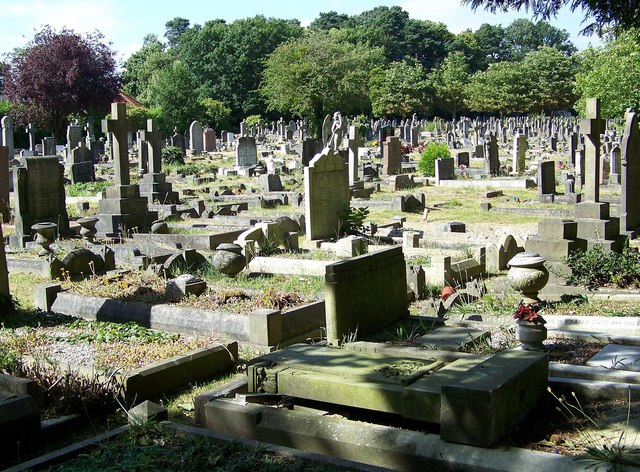
- Graves at Hollybrook
- Interactive map of Hollybrook Cemetery

Details
- Established: 1911
- Location: Shirley Warren
- Country: United Kingdom
- Coordinates: 50.936°N 1.429°W
- Type: Public
- Owned by: Southampton City Council
- No. of graves: 53,000
- Website: Official website

Hollybrook Cemetery is a cemetery in Bassett, Southampton, England, containing around 53,000 graves as of August 2012 and still open to new burials as of December 2025. It is one of the main cemeteries in Southampton.

== History ==
The first burial in the cemetery took place on 5 March 1913. During World War I, Southampton was designated "No 1 Port" – the primary point of departure for soldiers heading to the front, and for wounded servicemen arriving back in the United Kingdom. Along with other locations in the city, the Shirley Warren Infirmary (now Southampton General Hospital) was used as a military hospital during the conflict. Hollybrook Cemetery contains 113 Commonwealth war graves from the First World War, most of them located in a distinct plot close to the cemetery's main entrance.

The Hollybrook Memorial, located close to this plot, was erected to commemorate 1,956 personnel from the Commonwealth land and air forces whose graves are unknown. These are all individually named on the monument itself, and include those lost or buried at sea and those who died at home but whose bodies could not be retrieved. Built to a T. Newman design, the memorial was officially unveiled on 10 December 1930 by Sir William Robertson.

Southampton also played a major part as a port in World War II, with 4.5 million tons of military equipment passing through the port, parts of the prefabricated harbours for the Normandy invasions being constructed in the city and acting as a base for the 14th Major Port Transportation Corps of the United States Army. The city was heavily damaged in the Southampton Blitz with significant loss of life. The cemetery contains 186 Commonwealth military graves from the Second World War, three of which are the graves of unidentified Merchant Navy seamen.

The cemetery is home to a further 67 war graves of non-Commonwealth personnel, many of whom were German. Two of the 67 non-Commonwealth military graves are unidentified.

Among the buildings destroyed in the Southampton Blitz was All Saints' Church in the city centre. The remains of 403 people were transferred from the catacombs of that church to a communal grave in Hollybrook Cemetery in August 1944, prior to the demolition of the ruins of the church building. Stones gathered from bomb-damaged buildings in the city were used to construct a bench, located close to the chapel, to commemorate the civilian dead of the war; the bench was constructed by David Banks of Lymington.

In the 1950s, an etched glass reredos screen was installed in the chapel by a local glass merchant, E R Wright & Son.

Comedian Benny Hill was buried in Hollybrook Cemetery. His grave was subsequently broken into as a result of rumours that his collection of gold jewellery had been buried with him.

In 2012, the city council decided to make the post of cemetery superintendent redundant; the role had included use of the Hollybrook Cemetery lodge as a place of residence for a nominal rent. The final postholder, Jim Emery, had been in the role for 26 years.

== Buildings and structures ==
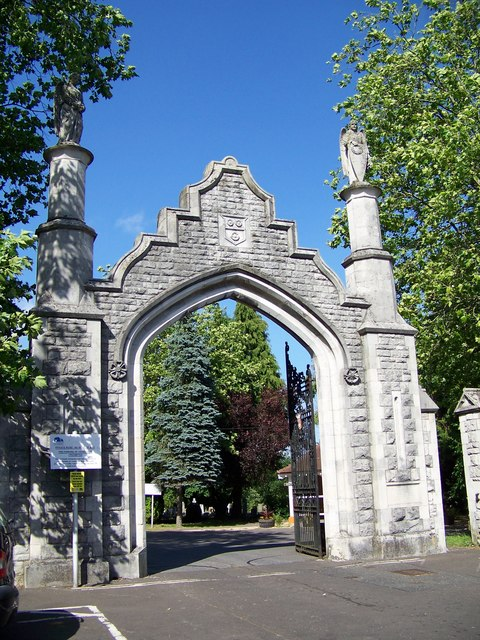
Main entrance

=== Cemetery gates and perimeter wall ===
The primary entrance gateway to the cemetery dates from around 1910. The gateway was constructed from coursed rubble and has ashlar dressings. The central archway, the vehicular entrance, is topped with a stepped parapet incorporating the Southampton Civic Shield and flanked by piers on either side. The bases of the piers are square, with two octagonal stages above, and statues of angels on top. Pedestrian entrances are located on both sides of the gateway; each of these entrances has square piers with gabled caps on either side. A low wall of similar construction, around 2 feet high, runs from the gates around the outside of the cemetery. The gates, piers and walls were first listed for their special architectural or historic interest on 8 October 1981 and have Grade II status.

=== Chapel ===
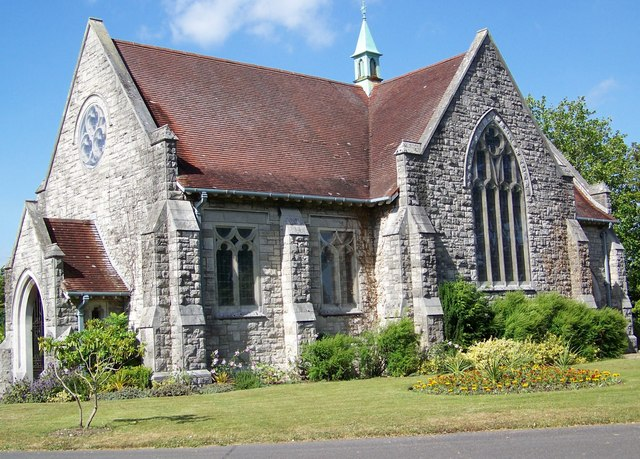
The chapel

The chapel was built around the same time as the gateway and walls and was then known as the "new" Chapel. The chapel is not listed.

== List of notable burials ==
| Person | Known for | Year of death / burial | Notes | References |
|---|---|---|---|---|
| Hay Frederick Donaldson | Mechanical engineer and British Army officer | 1916 | Lost at sea; commemorated on the Hollybrook Memorial | |
| Wilfred Ellershaw | British Army officer who served as Aide-de-Camp to Lord Kitchener. | 1916 | Lost at sea; commemorated on the Hollybrook Memorial | |
| Herbert Kitchener | Senior British Army officer and colonial administrator | 1916 | Lost at sea; commemorated on the Hollybrook Memorial | |
| Frederick Fleet | First person aboard the Titanic to spot the iceberg that sank the ship | 1965 | | |
| Benny Hill | Comedian and actor | 1992 | | |

== See also ==
- Southampton (old) Cemetery
- South Stoneham Cemetery
