= Arezzo War Cemetery =

CWGC cemetery in Toscana, Italy

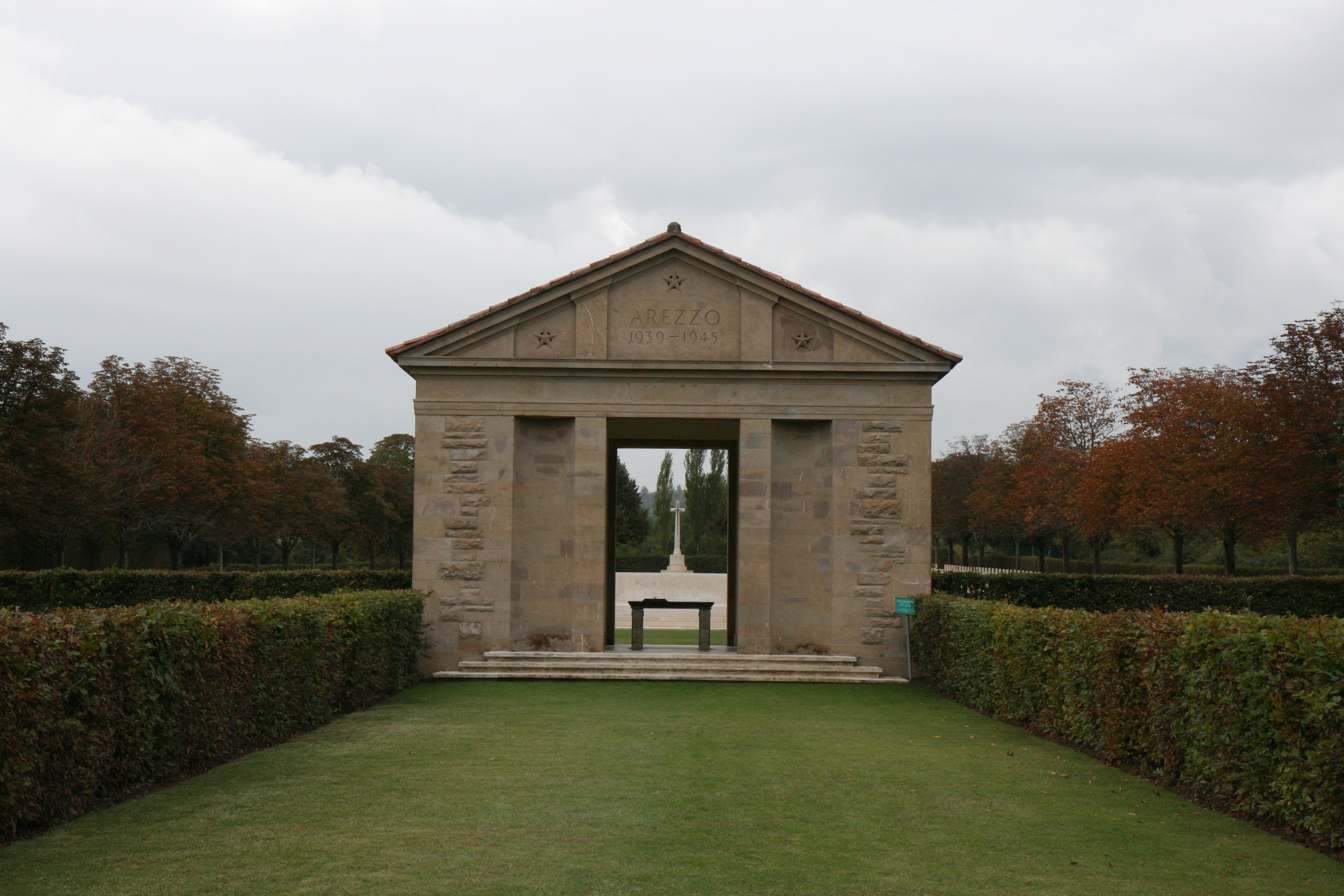
- The entrance, seen in 2007
- Interactive map of Arezzo War Cemetery

Details
- Established: November 1944
- Location: SR 69 Località Indicatore Zona Prima – 52020 Pratantico (AR) Tuscany
- Country: Italy
- Coordinates: 43.484069°N 11.790363°E
- Type: War cemetery
- Owned by: Commonwealth War Graves Commission
- No. of interments: 1,266
- Website: Official website
- Find a Grave: Arezzo War Cemetery

Arezzo War Cemetery is a war cemetery operated by the Commonwealth War Graves Commission, to the North West of the city of Arezzo, Italy. It was established in November 1944, to house the remains of Allied casualties from World War II. The remains of 1,266 men are interred there, mostly British. However, the interments also include a number of members of the 4th and 8th Divisions of the Indian Army, who are buried in a separate section, in plots VII–IX. The cemetery also has one American burial, plus more from Canada, New Zealand, and South Africa, and 37 who are unidentified.

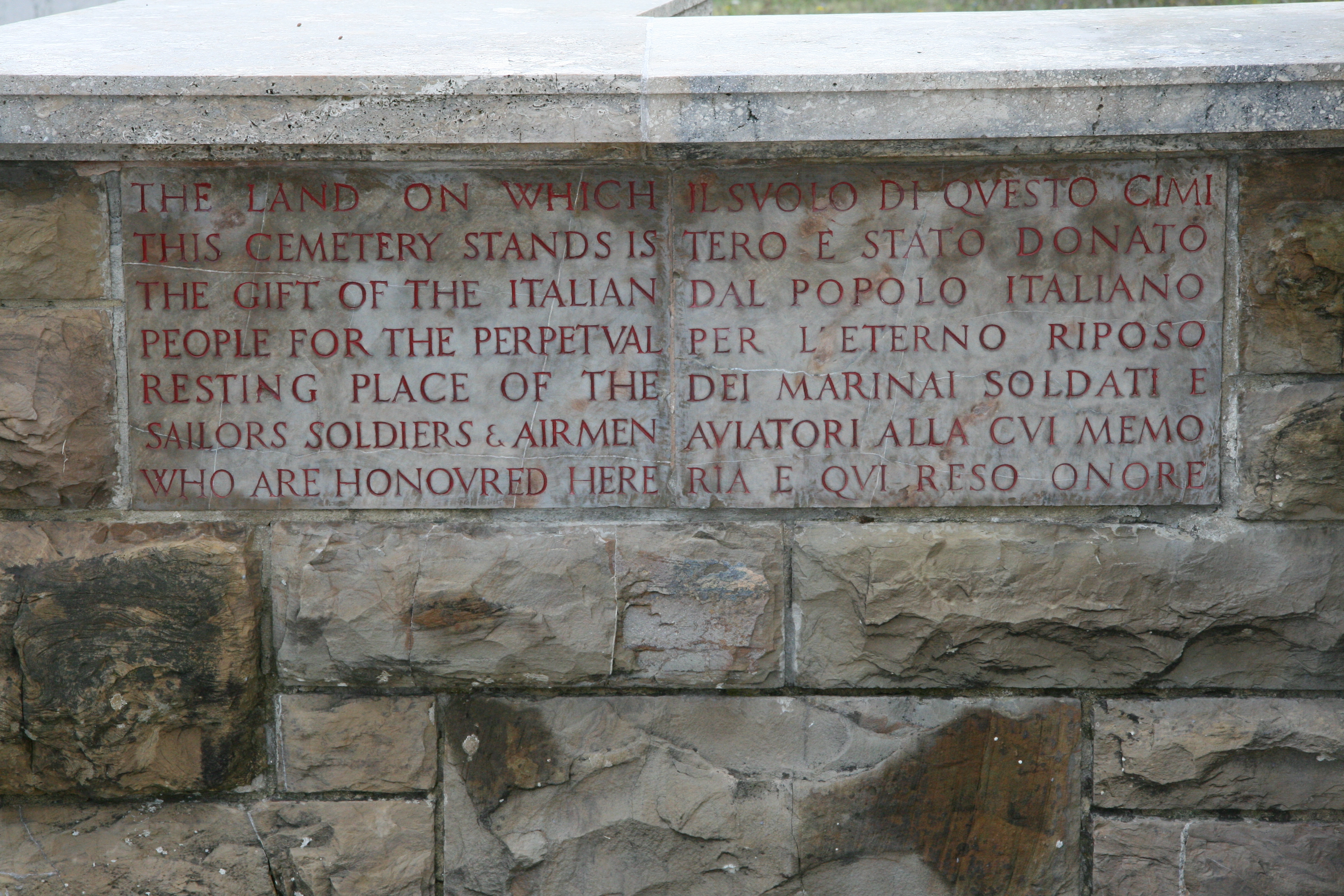
Inscription

Near the entrance is an inscription, in English and Italian, reading:

The land on which this cemetery stands is the gift of the Italian people for the perpetual resting place of the sailors, soldiers & airmen who are honoured here

Notable interments include Lieutenant St John Graham Young GC.
