= Reginald Hewer =

British military officer

Major-General Reginald Hewer CB CBE MC
- Born: 24 October 1892
- Died: 15 November 1970 (aged 78)
- Military career
- Allegiance: United Kingdom
- Branch: British Army
- Service years: 1914–1948
- Rank: Major-General
- Nickname: "Rex"
- Unit: Royal Field Artillery
- Conflicts: First World War; Second World War
- Awards: Companion of the Order of the Bath; Commander of the Order of the British Empire; Military Cross; Mentioned in Despatches (2)

Major-General Reginald Kingscote Hewer, CB, CBE, MC (24 October 1892 – 15 November 1970) was a British Army cavalry officer.

== Early life ==
Hewer was educated at Bloxham School, where he was a member of the Officer Training Corps.

== Military career ==
Hewer was commissioned into the Royal Field Artillery on 12 October 1914, and saw active service in the First World War. He was awarded the Military Cross on 17 December 1917. Following the war he served with the 7th Dragoon Guards, and later with the 7th Queen's Own Hussars. Between the wars, he held command positions in the Royal Armoured Corps.

At the start of the Second World War, Hewer was serving as Deputy Assistant Quartermaster-General, War Office. Between 1939 and 1940 he fought in the Battle of France as Assistant Quartermaster-General of Movements with the British Expeditionary Force. Following the fall of France he was appointed an Officer of the Order of the British Empire for his part in organising the Dunkirk evacuation and posted to Middle East Command, first as Assistant Adjutant & Quartermaster-General, and then later Director of Movements with the same formation in the temporary rank of brigadier. Hewer was Mentioned in Despatches for services in the Middle East on 30 December 1941. He was promoted to the substantive rank of colonel on 27 June 1942 and advanced to Commander of the Order of the British Empire on 9 September 1942. Hewer was made acting major-general on 28 March 1943. He was further mentioned in despatches on 6 April 1944 for distinguished service in the Middle East.

== United Nations ==
Between 1945 and 1947, Hewer was Deputy Director-General of the United Nations European Central Inland Transport Organization. He retired on 29 May 1948 and was granted the honorary rank of major-general.
