= Mark Allbrook =

English cricketer and school headmaster

Personal information
- Full name: Mark Edward Allbrook
- Born: 15 November 1954 (age 71); Frimley, Surrey, England
- Batting: Right-handed
- Bowling: Right-arm off break

Career statistics
Competition	First-class	List A
Matches	47	1
Runs scored	309	3
Batting average	8.13	3
100s/50s	0/0	0/0
Top score	39	3
Balls bowled	7,111	–
Wickets	76	–
Bowling average	46.10	–
5 wickets in innings	2	–
10 wickets in match	0	–
Best bowling	7/79	–
Catches/stumpings	15/–	0/–
- Source: CricketArchive, 30 December 2021

Mark Edward Allbrook (born 15 November 1954) is an English former first-class cricketer and school headmaster.

Allbrook was educated at Tonbridge School and Trinity Hall, Cambridge, where he read classics. He played for Cambridge University Cricket Club from 1975 to 1978, the Combined Universities in 1978 and in 12 matches for Nottinghamshire County Cricket Club from 1976 to 1980. He also played in one 'youth' test match for England Young Cricketers in 1974 and for the Kent Second XI in 1974 and 1975. He was an off-break bowler and right-handed tail order batsman. He took 5 wickets in an innings on 2 occasions, with a best of 7 for 79 for Cambridge against Nottinghamshire.

Allbrook was a housemaster at Hurstpierpoint College 1980–94, deputy headmaster at Felsted School 1994–2002, and headmaster of Bloxham School 2002–13. In 2015 he became chairman of the Norwich Diocesan Board of Education.
