= Stephen Reynolds (writer) =

Stephen Sydney Reynolds (May 16, 1881, Devizes – February 14, 1919, Sidmouth) was an English author.

== Biography ==
Educated at Bloxham School, Manchester University, and the École des Mines at Paris, he became sub-editor of an Anglo-French review in 1902 and the following year began an association with the Woolley brothers, fishermen of Sidmouth, which lasted for some years. He thus familiarized himself with fishing and the fisherman's point of view so far as to become a recognised authority on the subject and a medium of communication between fishermen and the government. He was a member of the committee of inquiry into Devon and Cornwall fisheries (1912), and of the departmental committee on inshore fisheries (1913), and in that year he was appointed adviser on inshore fisheries to the Development Commission. In 1914, he became also resident inspector of fisheries for the S.W. area.

He died in the influenza pandemic following WWI.

== Publications ==
- A Poor Man's House (1908); 1909 edition
- The Holy Mountain, a novel (1909); 1910 edition
- Alongshore (1910)
- The Lower Deck, the Navy and the Nation (1912)
- How 'Twas : Short Stories and Small Travels. (1912)
