= Harry Godfrey Massy-Miles =

British army officer (1886-1918)

Captain Harry Godfrey Massy-Miles MC (1886 – 26 April 1918) was a British Army medical officer who was awarded the Military Cross for valour in the First World War.

== Family ==
He was the son of Revd. Joseph Henry Miles, and Adelaide Mary Louisa Massy. He was educated at Bloxham School from 1900 to 1903, and later studied medicine at the Royal College of Physicians of Ireland, where he achieved his LRCP.

He was married on 3 July 1911 at Zion Church, Rathgar, Dublin to Charlotte Elizabeth Josephine Ingle, eldest daughter of A. F. Ingle (Superintendent of Indian Post Offices), and Mrs. Ingle of 24 Grosvenor Place, Rathmines, Dublin.

== Military career ==
He was assigned to the Royal Army Medical Corps and appointed a temporary Lieutenant on 21 December 1914. He was then joined to the 8th London Regiment Post Office Rifles, 58th Division.

He was awarded the Military Cross. During several days of severe fighting he kept in close touch with the battalion, working unceasingly without rest during the whole period, dressing the wounded including the French. He showed great initiative in establishing forward regimental aid posts, reconnoitring their sites beforehand under heavy hostile shell fire, thus greatly assisting the rapid evacuation of casualties. His courage and cheerfulness throughout a period of great strain were beyond praise.

He was at his Regimental Aid Post when he heard that a gas shell had burst on the Battalion H.Q. at Villers-Bretonneux, had pierced the roof, and penetrated into the cellar. He at once went to attend the cases and, when he had finished, returned to his post. Later, he complained of feeling ill and lay down. On getting worse, he was removed to the 8th General Hospital at Rouen where he died on 26 April 1918. His colonel wrote to his old school:

"Captain Massy Miles was with this division for a long time, and was one of my ablest and most gallant officers. He did splendid work during the retirement in March, and was awarded the Military Cross for his gallant work. We all deplore his loss deeply, and I lose a valued friend and trusty officer." R.I.P.

He is buried in the St Sever Cemetery, Rouen.

A prize was established in his memory by his widow at the Royal College of Physicians of Ireland.
