= Henry Allan Roughton May =

British Army officer (1863–1930)

Henry A. R. May CB VD
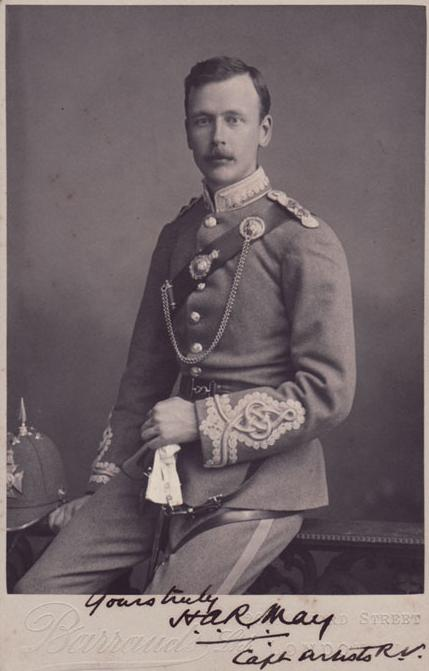
- May as a Captain
- Born: 23 August 1863
- Died: 10 April 1930 (aged 66)
- Allegiance: United Kingdom
- Branch: British Army
- Service years: 1882–1918
- Rank: Colonel
- Commands: Artists Rifles
- Conflicts: First World War
- Awards: Companion of the Order of the Bath, Volunteer Officers' Decoration

Colonel Henry Allan Roughton May CB VD (23 August 1863 – 10 April 1930) was a British Army officer who served as Commanding Officer (1912 and 1920) of the Artists Rifles.

== Biography ==
May was educated at Bloxham School. He joined the Artists' Rifles in 1882, as a private but rose to the rank of Colonel.

In 1914, when the call came, he was the command of the corps, which formed then the 28th Battalion London Regiment, and after being in command of troops at the Tower, he went over to France in October, 1914, just after the disastrous retreat from Mons, when General Sir John French's army was denuded of officers. General French called on the Artists to replace the heavy casualties, and this, under Colonel May, was done, and done so well that for the greater part of the war period May was occupied in training officers for the Army. He also had other important duties at G.H.Q. in France, but, at the end of 1915, he was gassed and invalided home. On recovering from a severe illness he was appointed to the important post, which he held till the end of the War, of Commandant at Tidworth of the Southern Command School of Instruction for Infantry Officers, where over 14,000 Officers passed through his curriculum. He was succeeded in France by his Second-in-command, Lt. Col. Chatfeild-Clarke, who carried on until the summer of 1917. He was appointed a Military Companion of the Order of the Bath in 1915.
