= Wieltje Farm Commonwealth War Graves Commission Cemetery =

WWI CWGC cemetery in Ypres, Belgium

Wieltje Farm Cemetery
- Commonwealth War Graves Commission
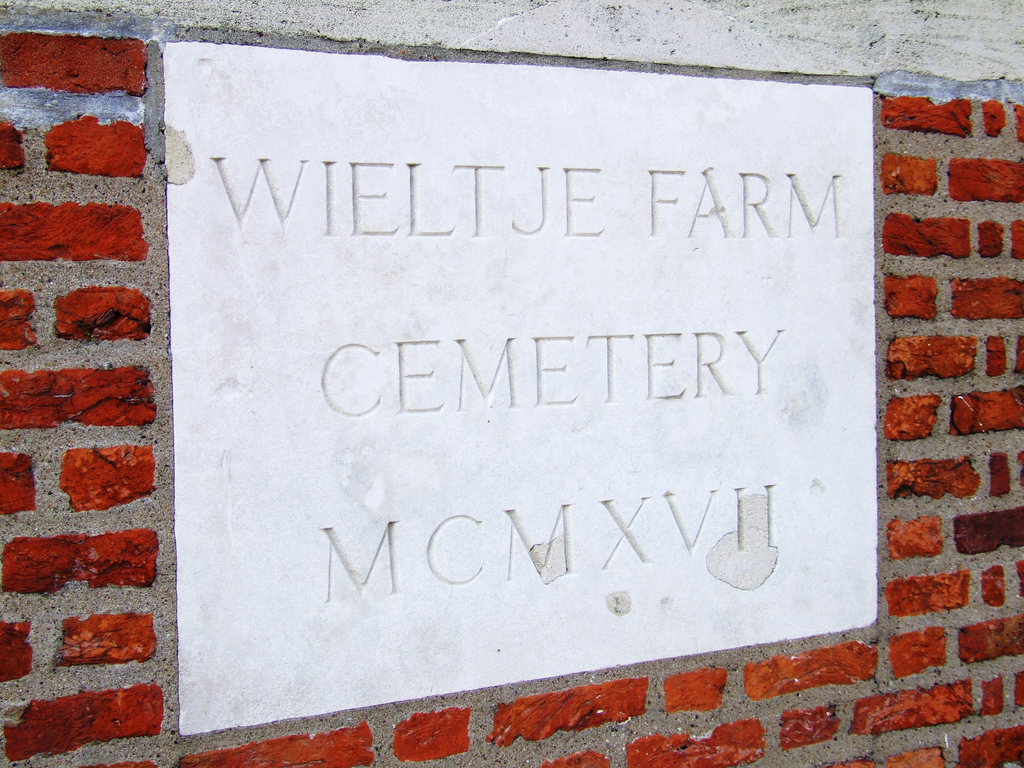
- Used for those deceased 1917–1918
- Established: July 1917
- Location: 50°52′09″N 02°54′38″E near Ypres, West Flanders, Belgium
- Designed by: A J S Hutton
- Total burials: 116

Burials by nation
- Allies of World War I: United Kingdom: 113; Canada: 1; New Zealand: 1; Central Powers: Germany: 1

Burials by war
- World War I: 116

Wieltje Farm Cemetery is a Commonwealth War Graves Commission burial ground for the dead of the First World War located near Ypres (Ieper) in Belgium on the Western Front.

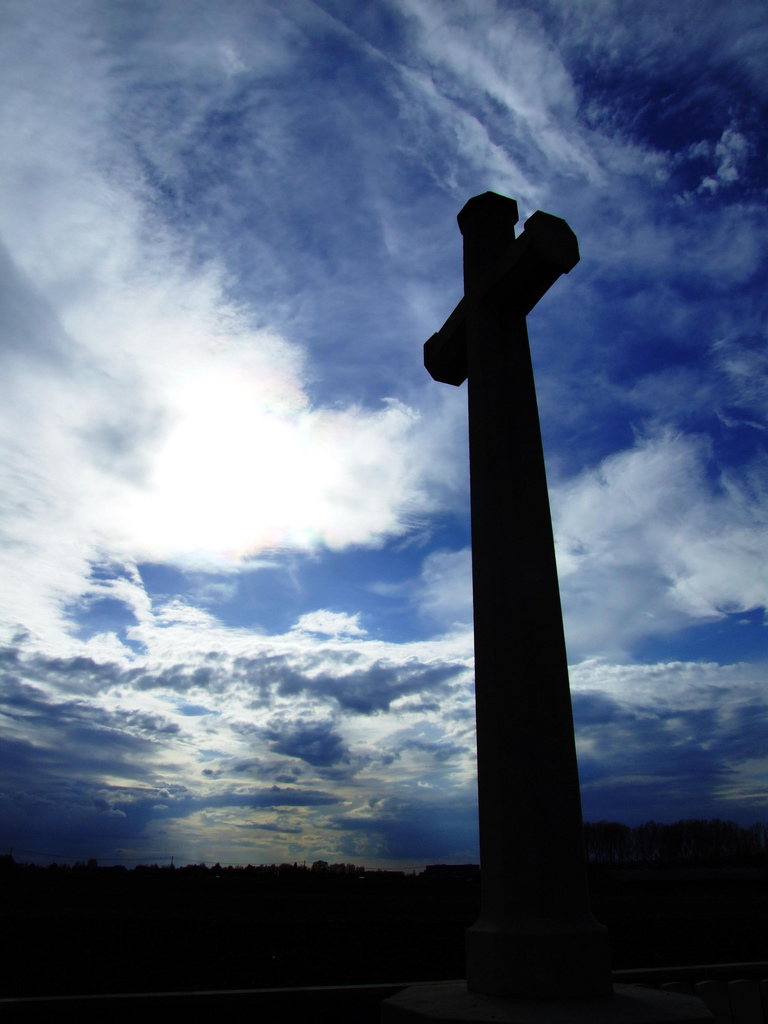
The War Cross

The cemetery grounds were assigned to the United Kingdom in perpetuity by King Albert I of Belgium in recognition of the sacrifices made by the British Empire in the defence and liberation of Belgium during the war.

== Foundation ==
The cemetery, named after a nearby farm, was begun by the 2nd and 4th Gloucesters amongst others in July 1917. It was closed in October 1917.

The cemetery was designed by A J S Hutton.
