= Lowestoft Hospital =

- James Paget University Hospital NHS Foundation Trust
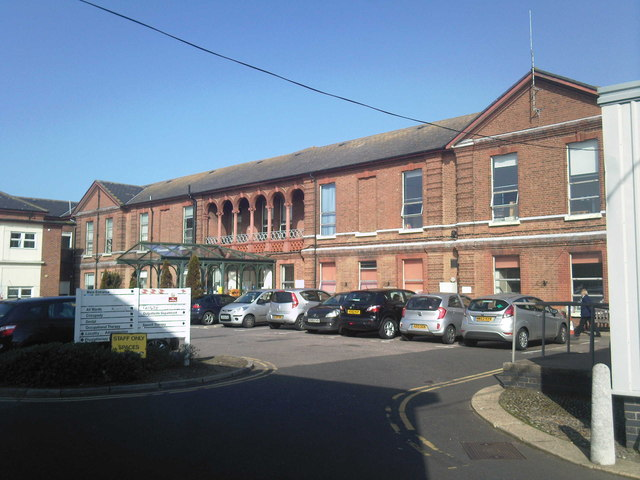
- Lowestoft Hospital

- Location in Suffolk

Geography
- Location: Tennyson Road, Lowestoft, Suffolk, United Kingdom
- Coordinates: 52.48°N 1.753°E

Organisation
- Care system: National Health Service

Services
- Emergency department: No facilities

History
- Founded: 1822
- Closed: 2016

Lowestoft Hospital was a National Health Service (NHS) hospital on Tennyson Road in Lowestoft in the English county of Suffolk. It was managed by the James Paget University Hospitals NHS Foundation Trust. It provided convalescing community care for elderly people, a minor injuries unit and a variety of other services.

== History ==
The hospital had its origins in the Mutford and Lothingland General Dispensary and Infirmary established in Bell Lane in 1822. It moved to St Mary's Plain in 1839 and, having been renamed Lowestoft Hospital in 1879, moved to Ten Acre Field in 1882. It moved to the Tennyson Road site, where some of the earliest buildings date from the late 19th century and are some 150 years old, in 1926. It joined the National Health Service in 1948.

The hospital was refurbished during the late 1990s. In 2011 the top floor of the hospital was closed with the loss of 13 beds, leaving the facility with 27 beds, mainly in use for elderly patients.

In early 2013 a proposal to review health care provision in Lowestoft gave rise to the potential closure of Lowestoft hospital, with the loss of community hospital beds in the town. Plans put forward by HealthEast included the relocation of services to health centres in Kirkley and in North Lowestoft. A public consultation on the relocation plans was launched in May 2013 and the final two services moved from the site in December 2016.
