= J. L. Clemence =

British architect

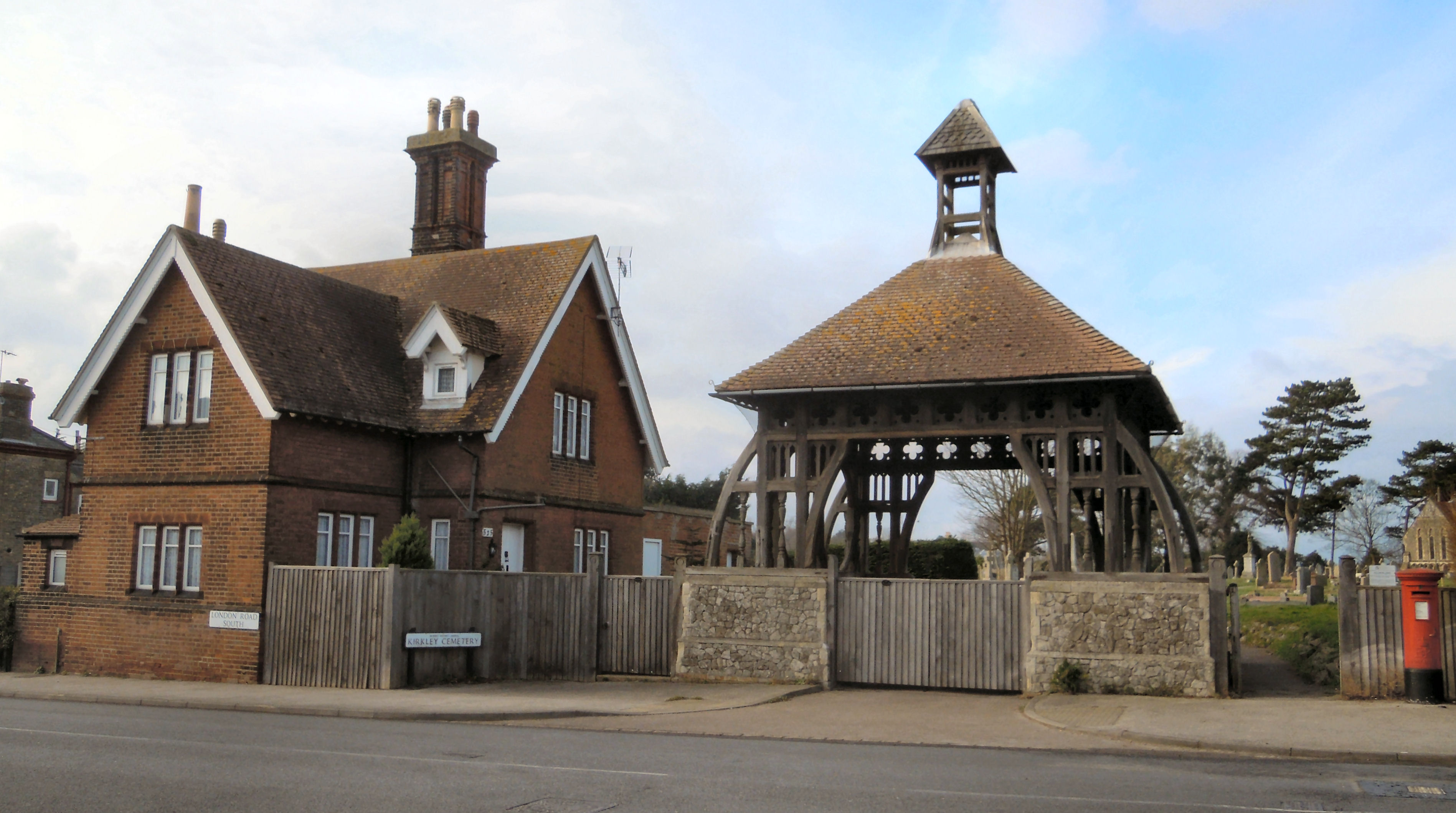
Kirkley Cemetery lychgate

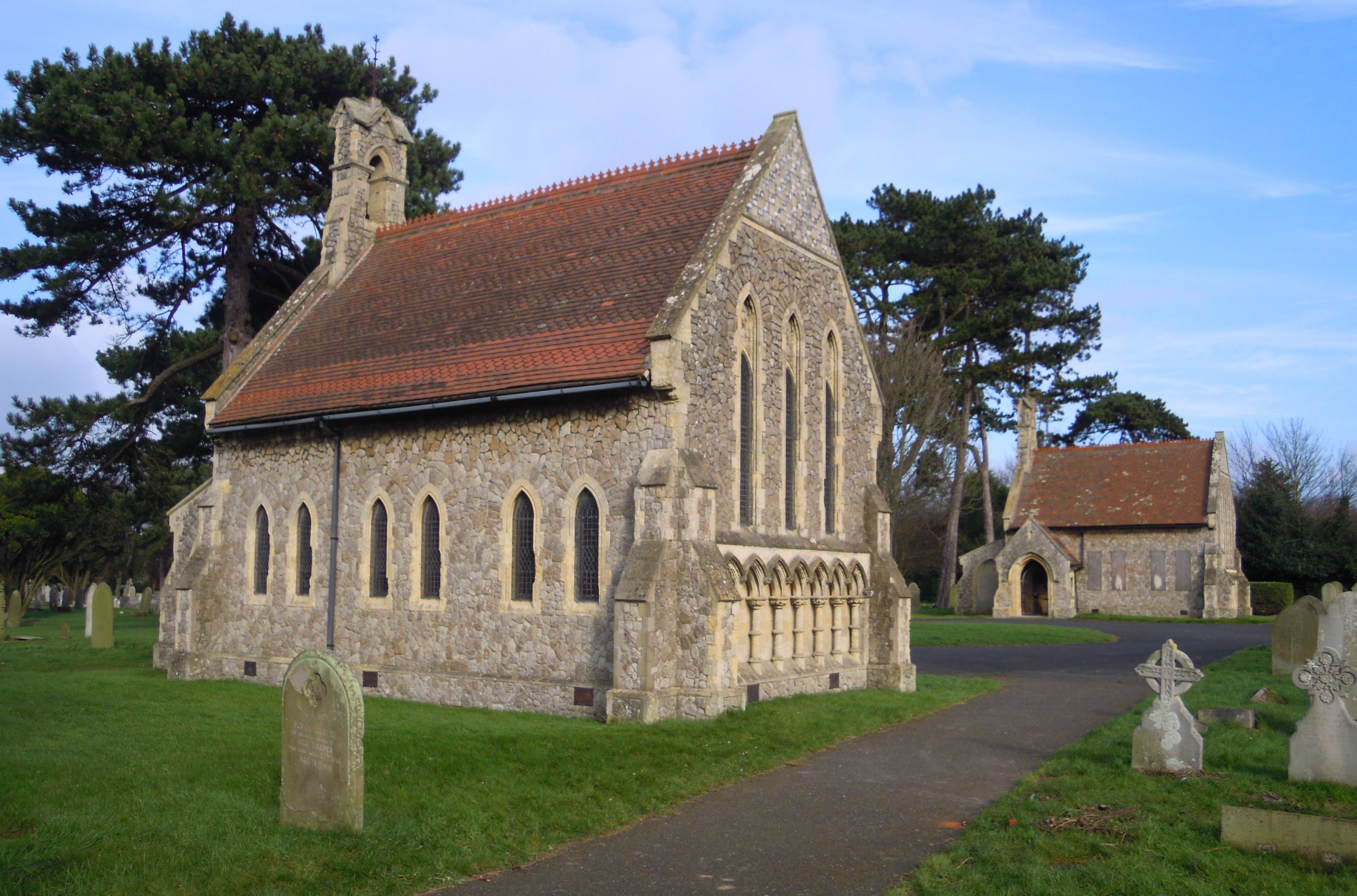
Kirkley Cemetery twin chapels

John Louth Clemence (1822, Lowestoft, Suffolk – 1911, Mutford, Suffolk) was an English architect, active in Suffolk, particularly Lowestoft.

== Early life ==
Clemence learnt his trade from 1839 to 1843 in the London offices of C.R. Cockerell. He then worked for Sir Morton Peto and the Lucas Brothers, who were Lowestoft-based building contractors.

== Architectural practice ==
Clemence practised in his own right from 1854. He designed the church of St John the Baptist, Lowestoft in 1853, which was demolished in 1978 and replaced by Levington House, a block of flats. As a child, the composer Benjamin Britten visited with his mother. They lived about a mile away in Kirkley, and his mother was the organist, so it is probable that he also played the organ. All that survives is the organ, which in 1979 was installed at nearby St Andrew, Gorleston. That organ is a 1904 instrument by the Norwich organ builders Norman and Beard; when it was installed it was rebuilt by Wood Wordsworth & Co of Leeds.

He also designed the Grade II listed Lowestoft Town Hall, which was built on the High Street in 1857.

Clemence designed several buildings in Kirkley Cemetery; the Lychgate, South Western and North Eastern Chapels which were all listed in 1998 as Grade II listed buildings. These were built in 1880.

== List of works ==
- St. Michael's Church, Geldeston, Norfolk
- Church of St. John the Baptist, Lowestoft, Suffolk
- Lowestoft Town Hall, Lowestoft, Suffolk
