= Lowestoft Town Hall =

Municipal building in Lowestoft, Suffolk, England

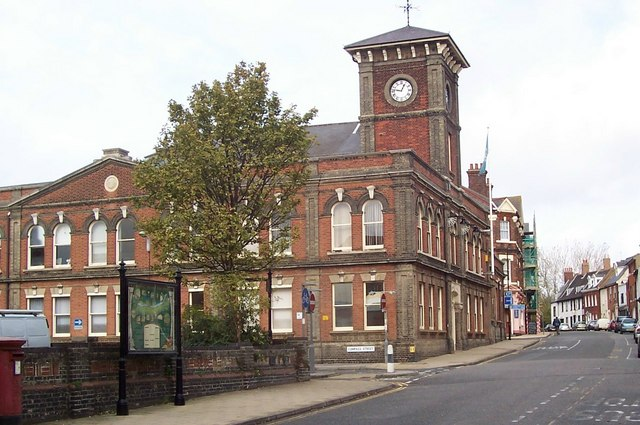
- Lowestoft Town Hall

- Shown in Suffolk
- 52.4832°N 1.7558°E
- Location: High Street, Lowestoft

History
- Built: 1860

Site notes
- Architect: John Louth Clemence
- Architectural style: Italianate style

Listed Building – Grade II
- Official name: Town Hall
- Designated: 21 June 1993
- Reference no.: 1279943

Lowestoft Town Hall is a Grade II listed municipal building in the High Street, Lowestoft, Suffolk, England.

Opened in 1860 to designs by John Louth Clemence, it replaced earlier town halls on the site and served as the headquarters of Lowestoft Borough Council for much of the 20th century. The building has been altered and extended several times, most notably in the late 19th and early 20th centuries. After local government reorganisation in 1974 it continued as a civic centre for Waveney District Council until 2015, when it became vacant pending redevelopment proposals.

== History ==
=== Early municipal buildings (1570–1832) ===
The first town hall in the town, which incorporated a chapel for use by parishioners unable to travel to St Margaret's Church, was completed in Market Street 1570. It was substantially rebuilt in 1698 with a corn cross (which indicated the area where markets could be held) on the ground floor, an assembly room on the first floor and a domed ceiling above. It was modified further when the northern part of the ground floor was converted for use as a vestry in 1768. After St Peter's Church was completed in 1832, the building was solely used for non-ecclesiastical purposes.

=== Construction of the present building (1857–1860) ===
The current building was designed by John Louth Clemence, built by John Newson and was officially opened on 6 March 1860. The design involved a symmetrical main frontage with seven bays facing onto the High Street; the central section originally featured a porch on the ground floor with a pair of round headed windows on the first floor and a clock tower above. The town clock contained a curfew bell which was cast at John Brand's bell foundry in Norwich for the first town hall in 1644 and was rung each evening at 8 p.m.

Internally, the principal rooms were the council chamber and chairman's room on the first floor. Three stained glass windows, designed by John Thomas and manufactured by James Ballantine of Edinburgh, were installed in the council chamber as a gift from Sir Morton Peto; the largest of the three windows commemorated the Anglo-French alliance against Russia during the Crimean War, while the smaller windows depicted Peto's links to the town.

Historic England records that the building was built between 1857 and 1860, altered between 1869 and 1873, rebuilt and extended between 1899 and 1905, with further 20th-century extensions.

=== Alterations and extensions (1872–1935) ===
The building was modified to the designs of William Oldham Chambers in 1872, when the porch was removed so allowing the High Street to be widened. Further reconstruction took place in 1899 when the High Street elevation was re-designed with a new doorway flanked by Corinthian order columns supporting an entablature inscribed with the words "Town Hall". The building was extended to the west along Compass Street in 1905, to the north along the High Street in 1912 and to the west along Mariners Street in 1935.

=== Civic role and memorials ===
The town hall was the headquarters of Lowestoft Borough Council for much of the 20th century and continued to serve as the local seat of government when the enlarged Waveney District Council was formed in 1974. Memorials were established in the town hall to commemorate the lives of two local people who were awarded the Victoria Cross. These were Claud Castleton, who earned his award after being killed trying to save the lives of three other soldiers during the Battle of Pozières in July 1916 and Thomas Crisp, who earned his award after being killed during the defence of his vessel, the armed naval smack Nelson, in the North Sea against an attack from a German submarine in August 1917.

=== Vacancy and redevelopment (2015–present) ===
The building became vacant and the windows were boarded up after Waveney District Council moved out of the building to share offices with Suffolk County Council at Riverside Road in 2015. Following a report by Colliers International issued in October 2019 setting out options for building, English Heritage recommended in March 2020 that a creative industries hub be established on the site and, in July 2020, Lowestoft Town Council secure a grant from the Architectural Heritage Fund to develop a business plan for such a development.
