= Lowestoft Cemetery =

Cemetery in Lowestoft, Suffolk, England

Coordinates: 52°28′53″N 1°44′12″E

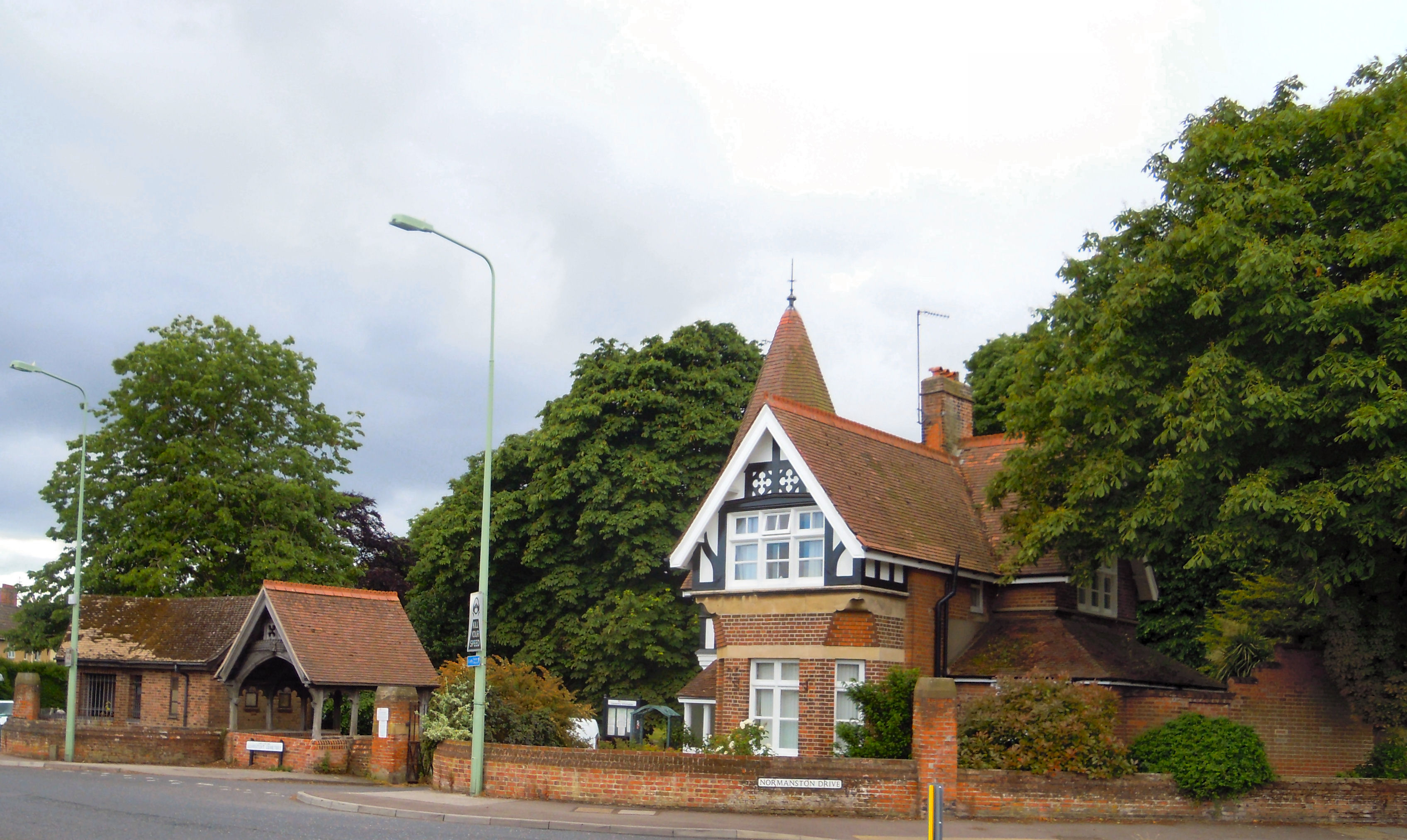
The Cemetery Lodge and lychgate at Lowestoft Cemetery

Lowestoft Cemetery (also known as Lowestoft Municipal Cemetery) is a burial ground in the town of Lowestoft in Suffolk. It is best known for its large number of Royal Navy burials from World War I and World War II; these are maintained by the Commonwealth War Graves Commission. Thomas Crisp, who was posthumously awarded the Victoria Cross in 1917 is commemorated here on his wife's headstone. Buried here is Robert William Hook, coxswain at RNLI Lowestoft from 1853 to 1883 and who has been credited with saving more than 600 lives. The cemetery is managed by East Suffolk Council. https://www.eastsuffolk.gov.uk

Located on the corner of Rotterdam Road and Normanston Drive, Lowestoft Cemetery received its first burial in 1885.

== History ==
The cemetery was first put into use in 1885 and occupied a large section of the former medieval West South Field, which had been purchased by the Town Authorities to cope with the growing local population during the 1840s resulting from the innovations in the town caused by Samuel Morton Peto's Lowestoft Railway and Harbour Company which ran the first railway into the town. St. Margaret’s churchyard had been greatly expanded – to the east, particularly – but was no longer able to cope with the number of burials required.

The fine mock Tudor cemetery lodge and its accompanying lychgate were designed by Irish architect William Doubleday. The lychgate obviously had its entry bricked up at some stage, the simple stretcher bond used contrasting noticeably with the more complex Flemish and English bond variants of the Lodge itself and of the curving boundary wall.

== Military cemetery ==
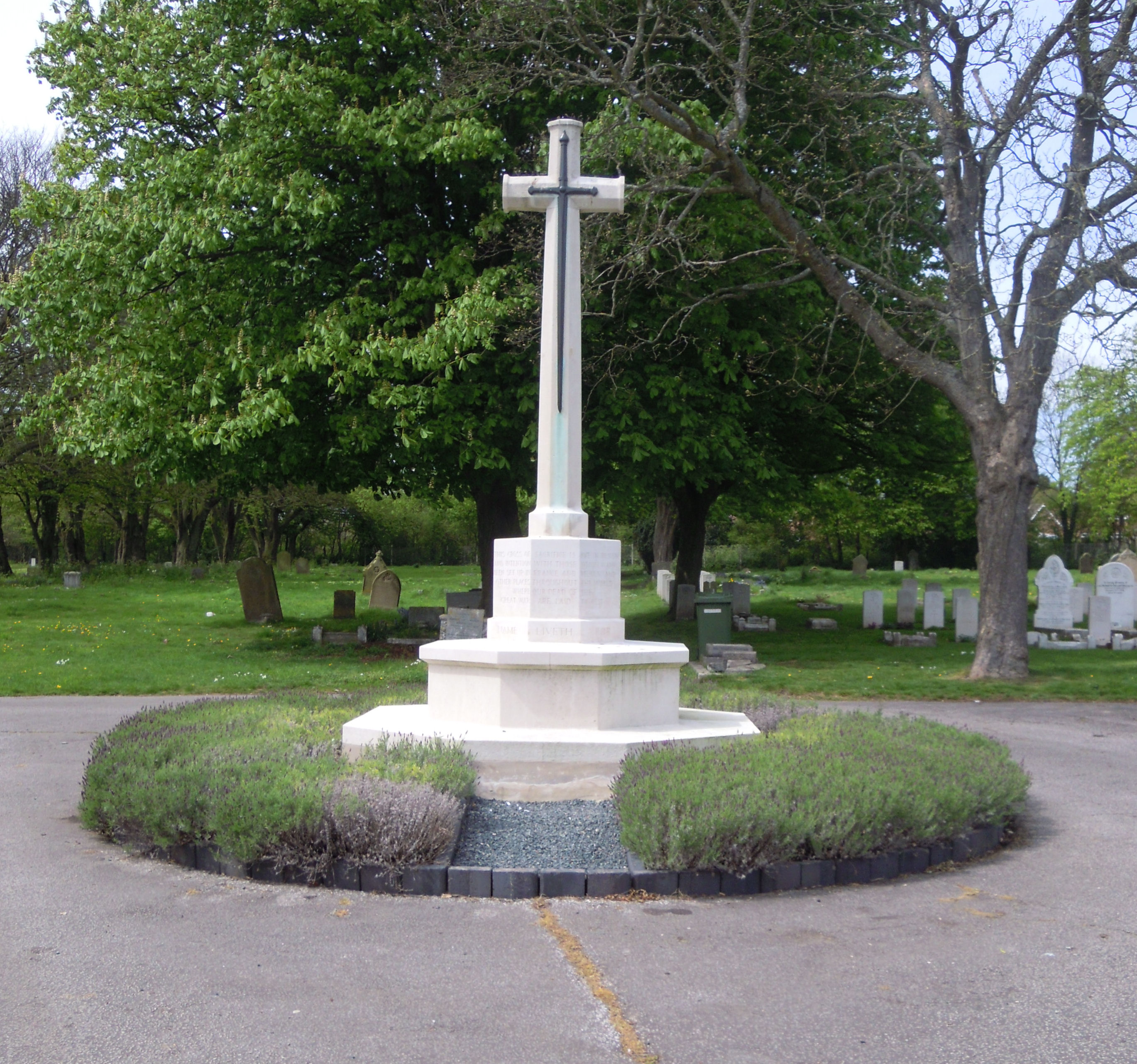
The Cross of Sacrifice in Lowestoft Cemetery

During World War I Lowestoft was a trawler base with a Port Minesweeping Officer in command; during World War II it was the central Depot for the Royal Naval Patrol Service, hence the large number of burials from the Royal Navy.

The World War I burials are mainly located in Plots 12, 13 and 14 on the cemetery's west side. After the war a Cross of Sacrifice was built near to these plots to commemorate the servicemen buried there. Most of the World War II graves are in one or other of four War Graves Plots, three of which are in the western part of the cemetery and one to the east of the main entrance. The rest can be found throughout the cemetery.

The cemetery holds 95 Commonwealth service burials from World War I and 122 from World War II, including 11 unknown seamen from the Merchant Navy, most of whose bodies were washed up in the area. Lowestoft Cemetery also holds 11 German war burials including an unidentified airman whose body was washed up at Gunton in 1943 and two non-war service burials, giving it the largest group of World War II German graves in Suffolk. Many other German burials were exhumed from the cemetery in the 1960s and transferred to the German Military Cemetery at Cannock Chase in Staffordshire.

== Burials ==
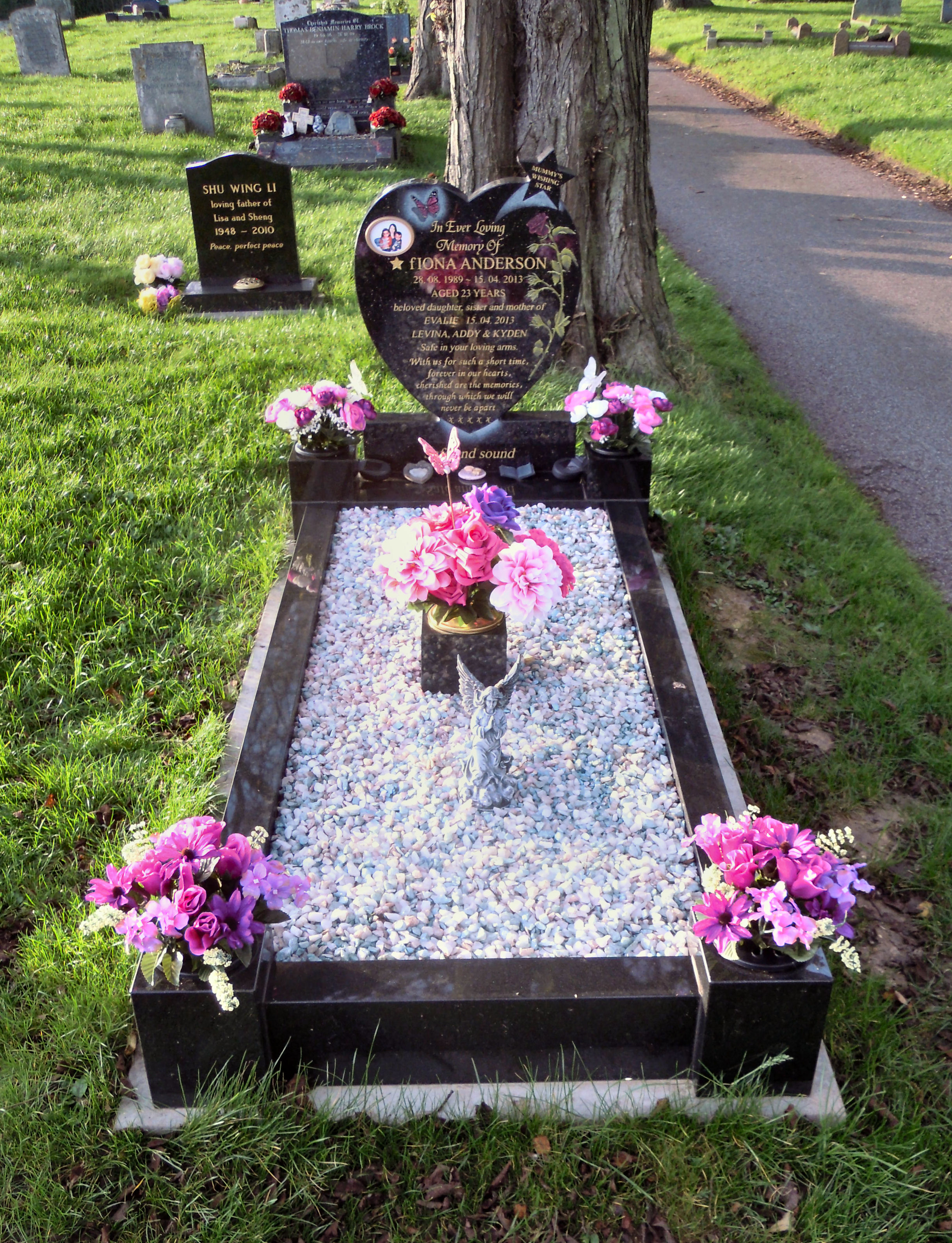
The grave of Fiona Anderson

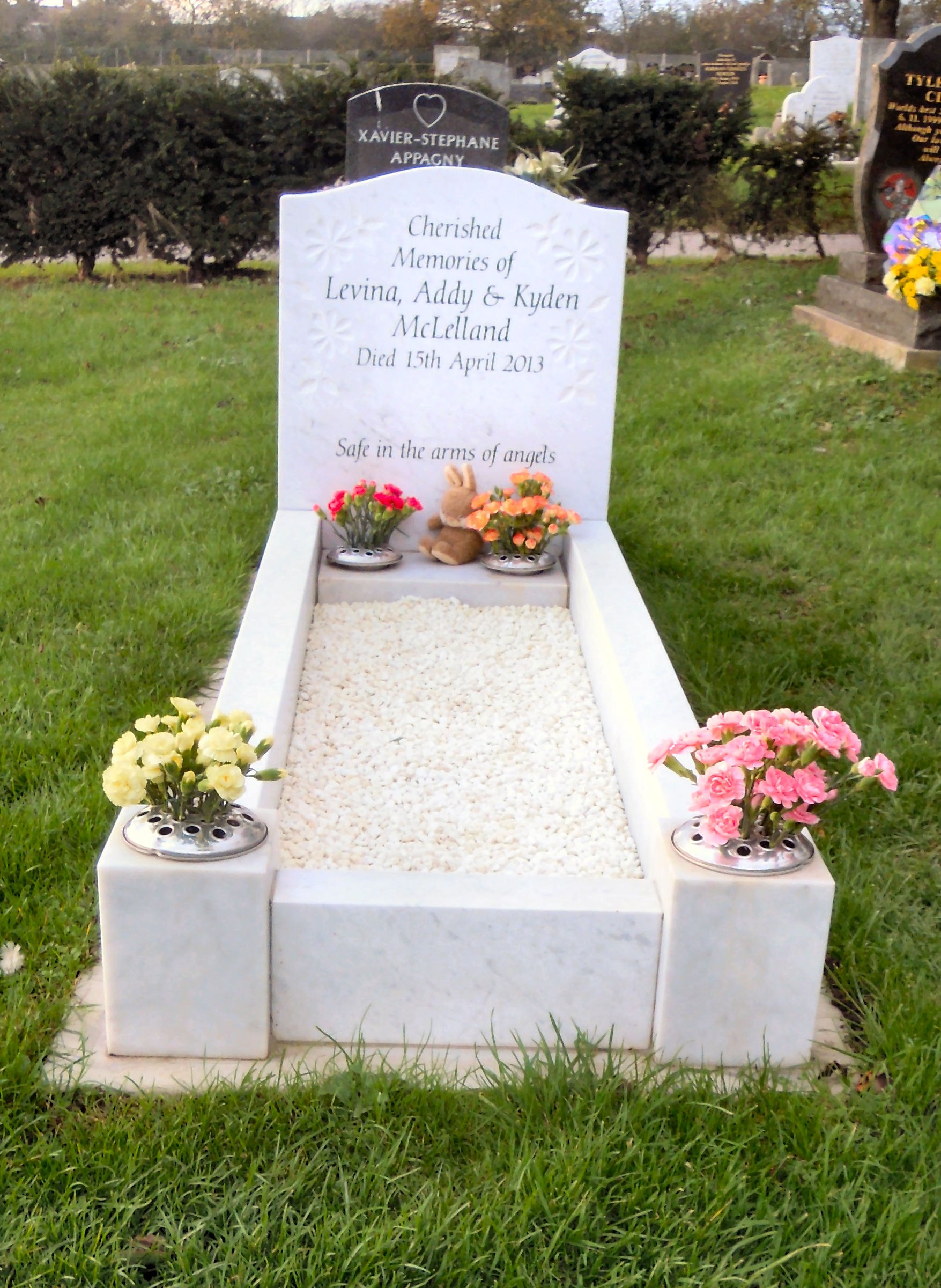
The grave of Addy, Levina and Kayden McLelland

Here in separate graves are buried Fiona Anderson (aged 23) and her four children, Levina (aged 3), Addy (aged 2), and Kayden McLelland (aged 11 months) as well as her unborn daughter, Evalie, in a case that made national headlines. After a violent dispute with the children's father, Miss Anderson became increasingly disturbed and drowned her three children in the bath at their London Road South home in Lowestoft before jumping to her death from a multi-storey car park in the town centre on 15 April 2013, at the same time killing her unborn daughter. When police officers visited Miss Anderson's home, they found the bodies of her three children in her double bed and messages that she had written on the walls using a green marker pen. One of these requested that she be buried with her children.

Despite a public appeal from Anderson's parents for her to be buried with her children, their father, Miss Anderson's former partner Craig McLelland, refused permission. The funeral service for Addy, Levina and Kayden McLelland was held at the Church of St Peter and St John in Kirkley on 5 June 2013.

== Notable burials ==
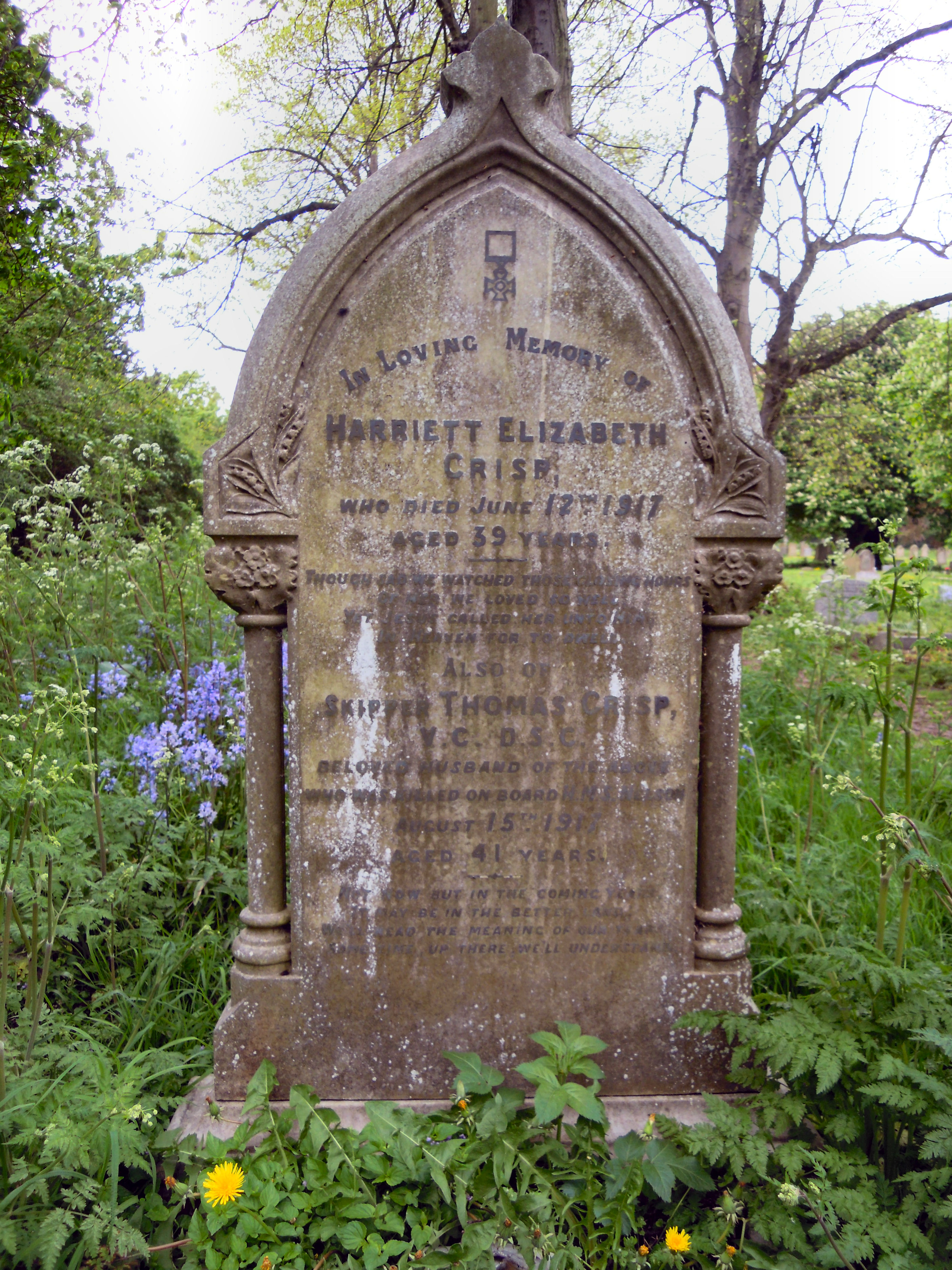
Thomas Crisp VC is commemorated on his wife's grave

- Thomas Crisp, VC, DSC, killed in action during the defence of his vessel, the armed naval smack His Majesty's Smack Nelson, in the North Sea in an Action of 15 August 1917 against an attack from a German submarine. His body went down with his ship. He is commemorated on his wife's grave.
- Robert William Hook (1828–1911), coxswain at RNLI Lowestoft from 1853 to 1883 and who has been credited with saving more than 600 lives during his career, both with Lowestoft RNLI and with private companies. His obituary in the Lowestoft Journal described him as ‘Lowestoft’s great lifeboat hero … the gnarled, weather-beaten old sea warrior, of giant frame – he stood over 6ft 3 ins and was of immense strength.’

== Gallery ==
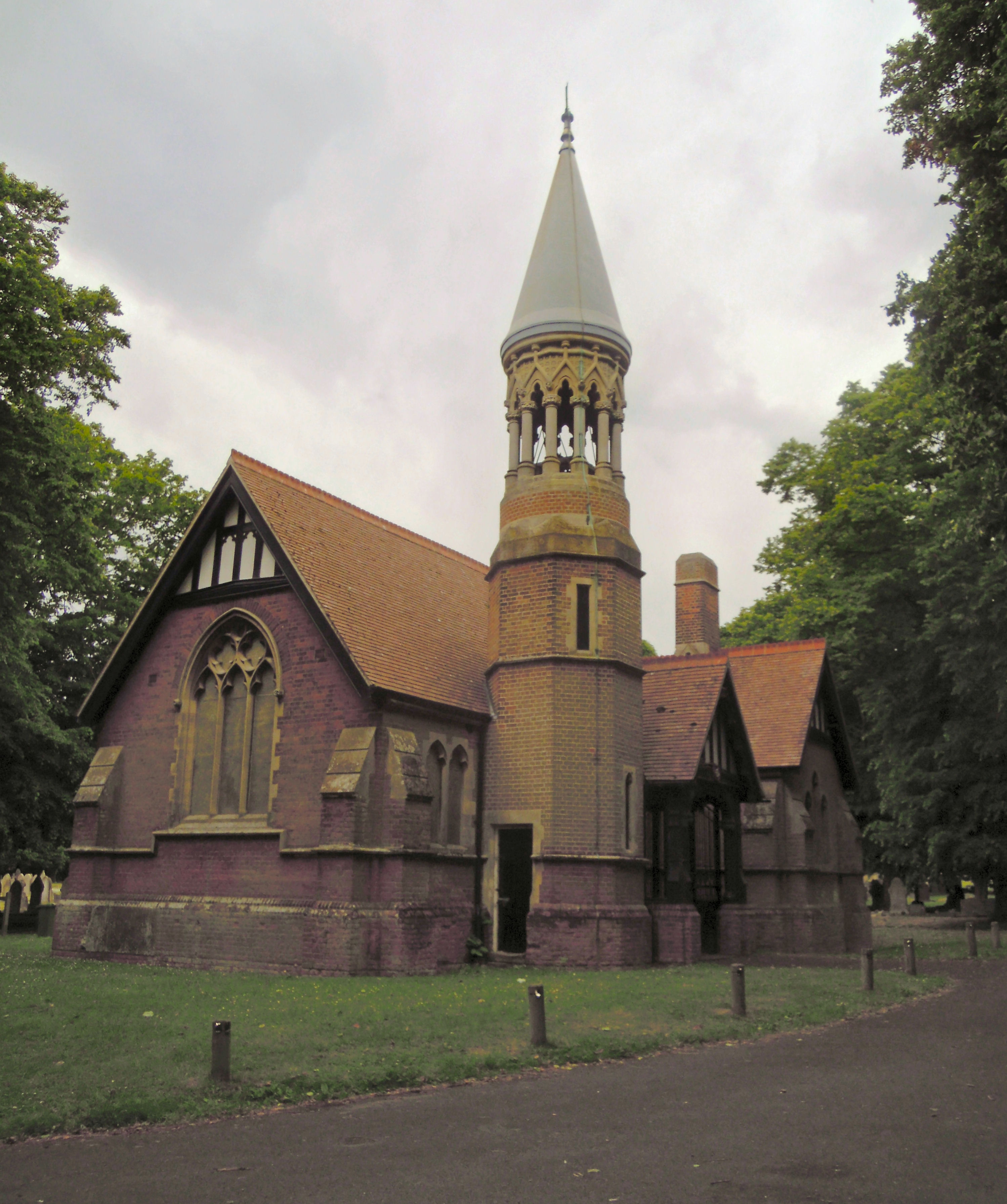
The Chapel at Lowestoft Cemetery

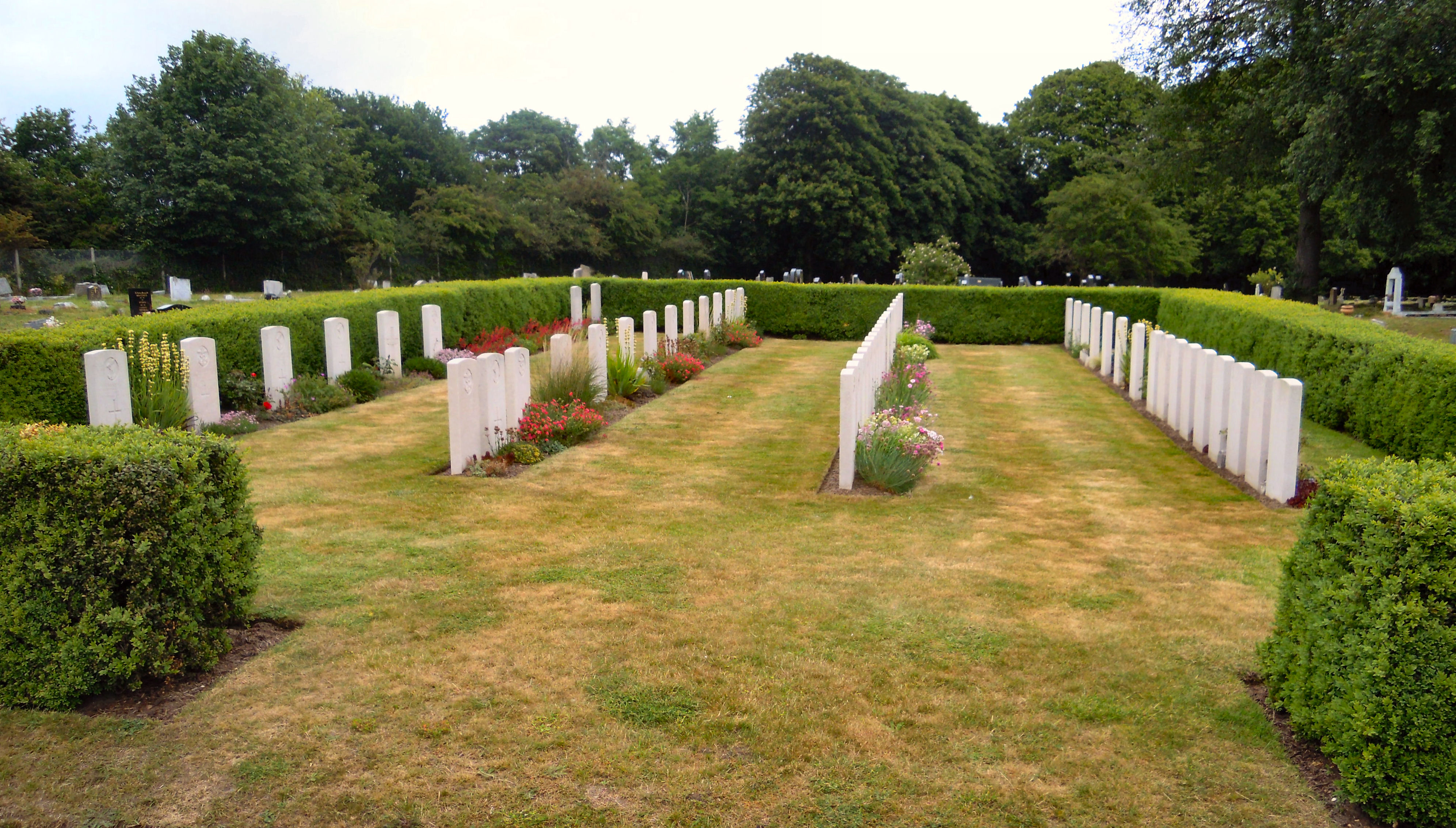
A Commonwealth War Graves Commission enclosure

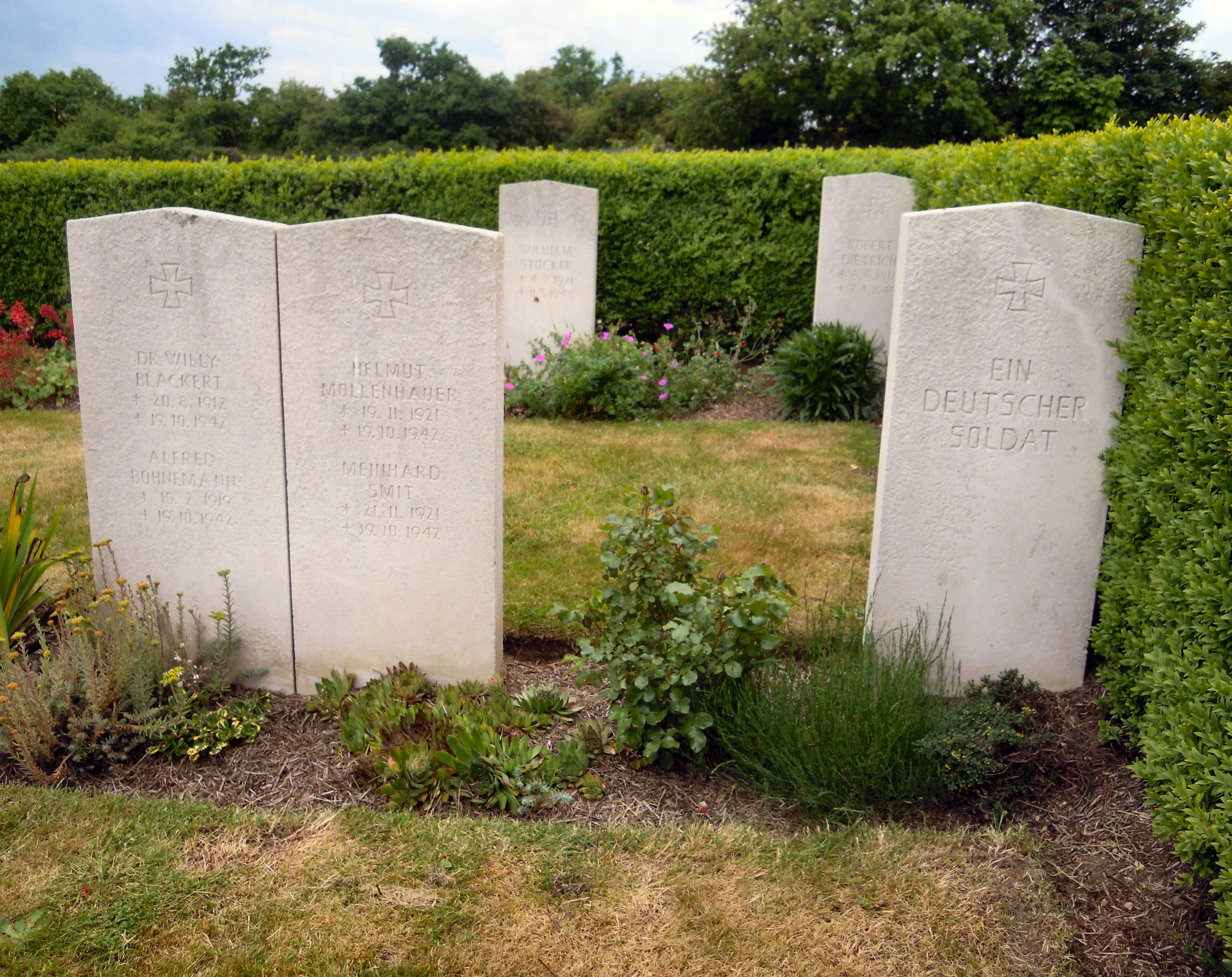
German burials in the cemetery

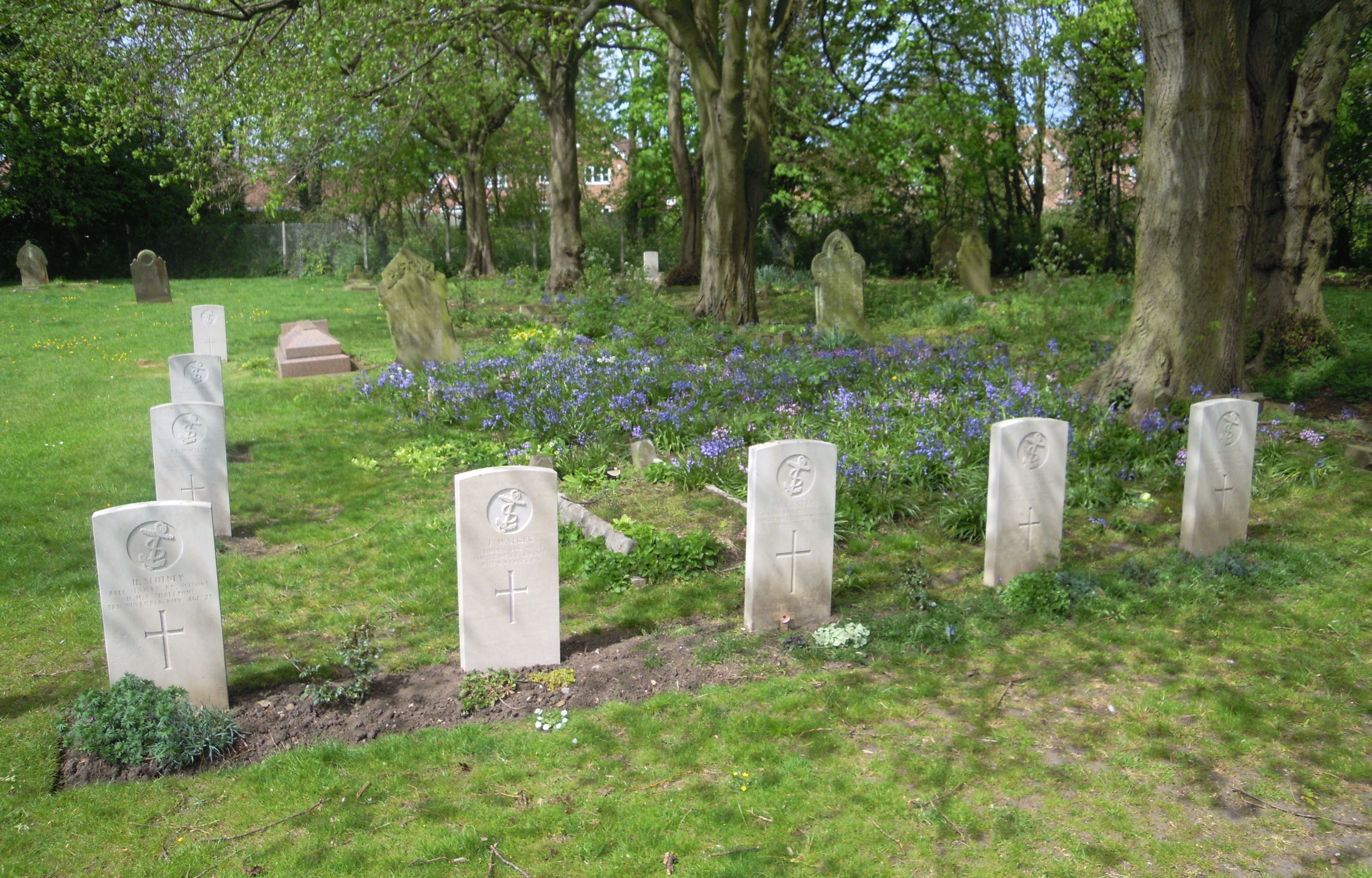
Royal Navy graves in Lowestoft Cemetery

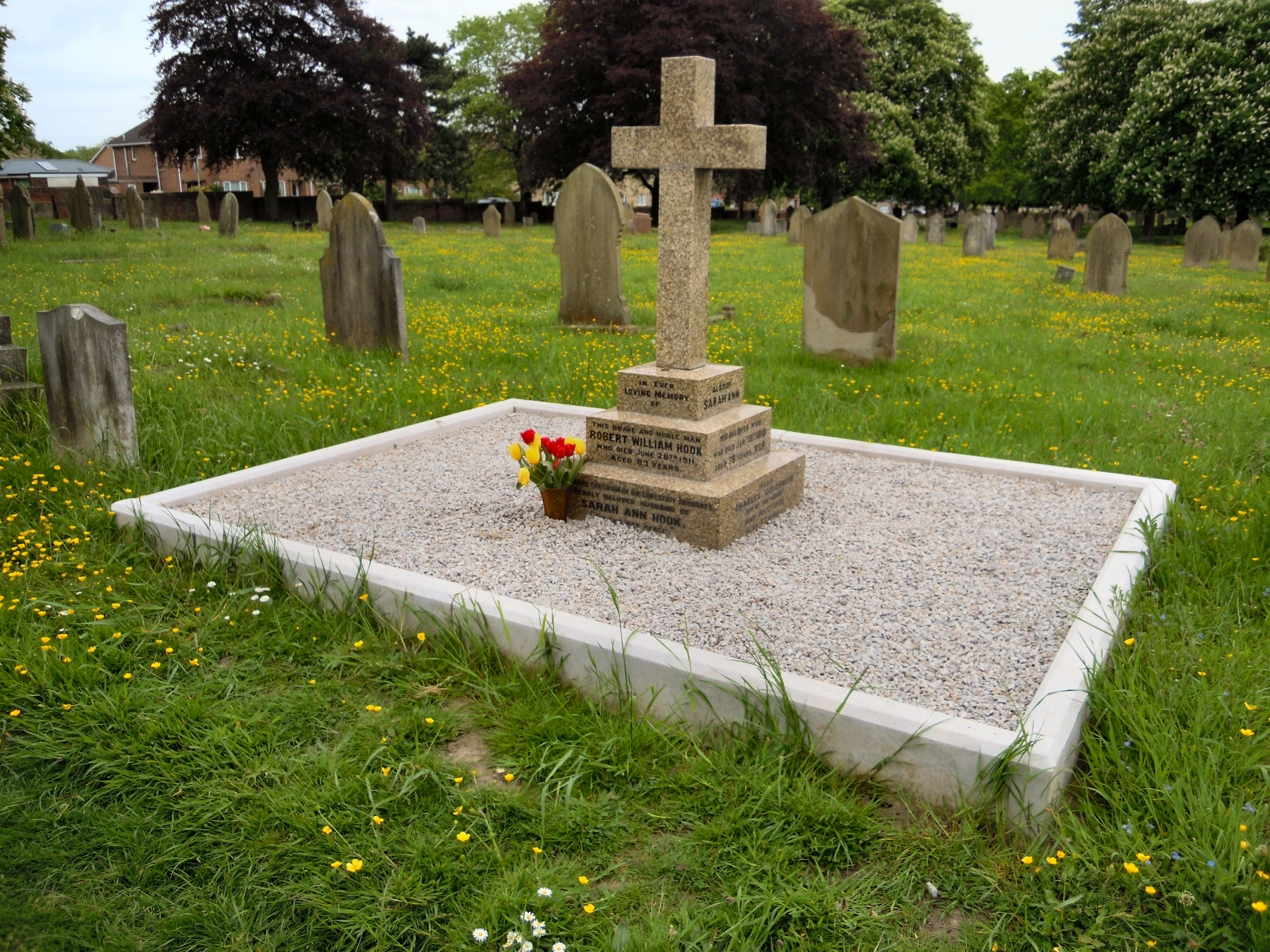
The grave of Robert William Hook

== See also ==
- Kirkley Cemetery
