= Robert Hook =

Robert Hook may refer to:

- Robert Hooke (1635–1703), English natural philosopher, architect and polymath
- Robert William Hook (1828–1911), coxswain of the Lowestoft lifeboat (1853–1883), credited with saving more than 600 lives

== See also ==
- Robert Hooks (born 1937), American actor, producer, and activist
