= Kirkley Cemetery =

Cemetery in Suffolk, England

Coordinates: 52°27′37″N 1°44′01″E

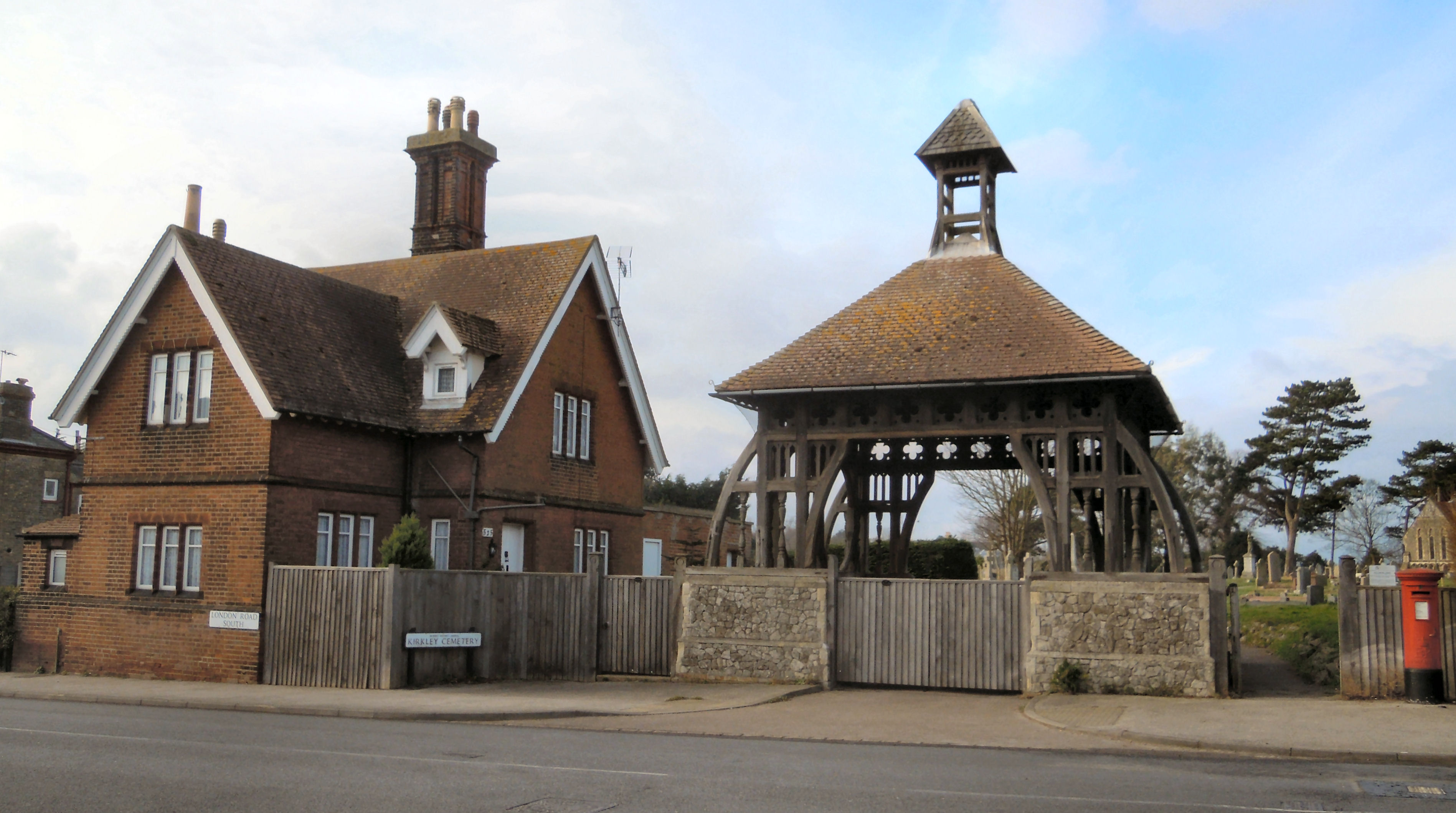
The Lychgate at Kirkley Cemetery

Kirkley Cemetery is a burial ground in the Kirkley area of Lowestoft in Suffolk. Located on London Road South, the cemetery is maintained by Waveney District Council and is open for traditional and Green Burials.

The cemetery contains 60 service personnel war burials from both World Wars which are registered with and maintained by the Commonwealth War Graves Commission. Amongst them are Lance Corporal John Murdoch Dirom who was killed during preparations for Operation Overlord in 1944 aged 22. Here also are buried civilian casualties of air raids on Lowestoft during World War II.

The cemetery's Lychgate, South Western and North Eastern Chapels were all listed in 1998 as Grade II listed buildings. These were designed by the Lowestoft-born architect J. L. Clemence (1822–1911) and were built in 1880. The first burials took place soon after.

== See also ==
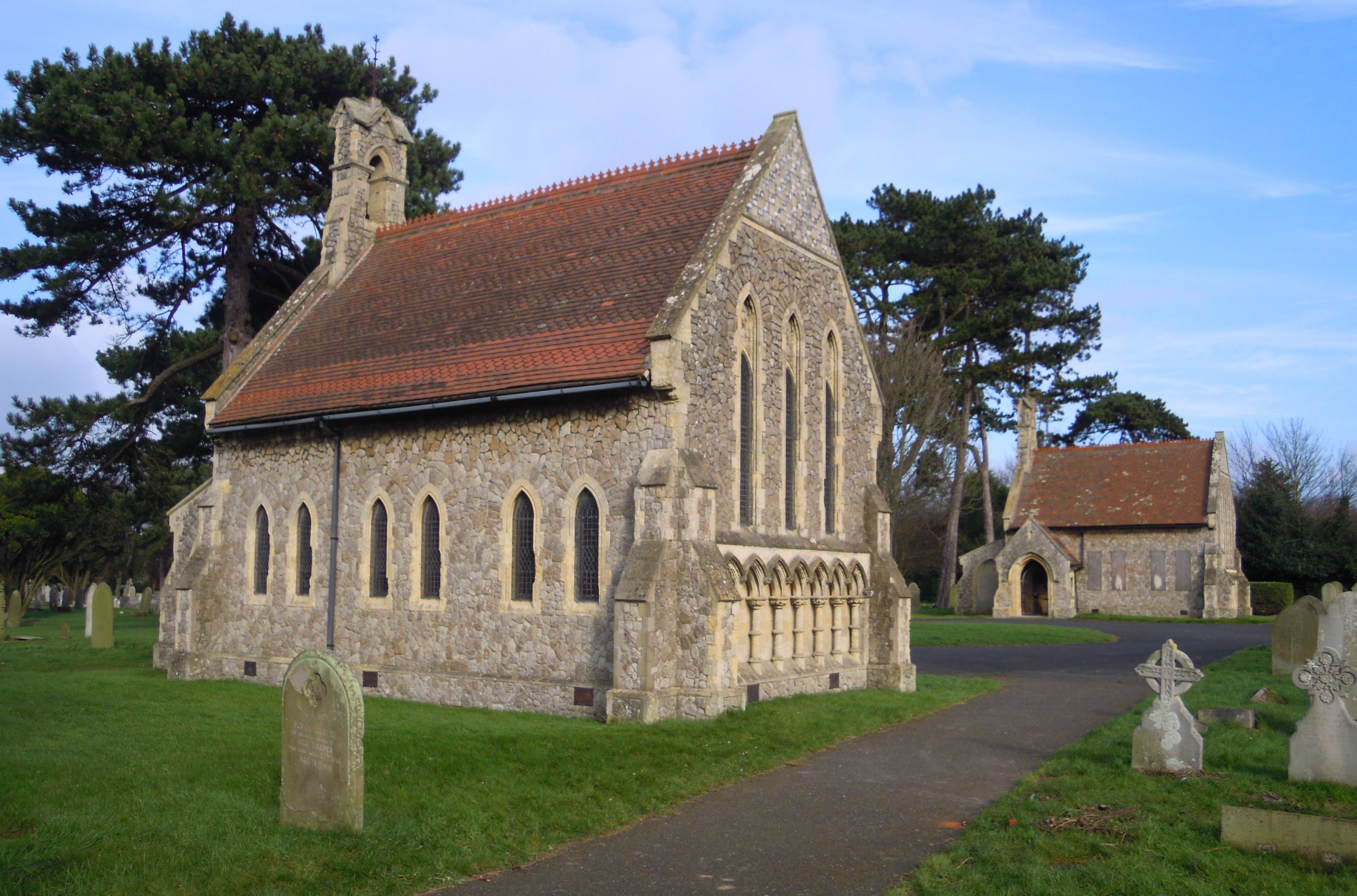
The Twin Chapels at Kirkley Cemetery

Lowestoft Cemetery
