= Robert William Hook =

Robert William Hook

Robert William Hook (4 June 1828 – 28 June 1911) was a fisherman and innkeeper and the coxswain of the Royal National Lifeboat Institution (RNLI) Lowestoft lifeboat and with private companies from 1853 to 1883 and who has been credited with saving more than 600 lives in addition to two cats and a dog. He was twice awarded the RNLI Silver Medal for gallantry.

In 1883 he was dismissed from the service amid much controversy for failing to launch the lifeboat on 28 October 1882 when over 22 people died.

== Early life ==
Bob Hook was born in Lowestoft in Suffolk in 1828, the son of Robert Hook, a fisherman and beach-man, and Elizabeth Ellis. In 1844 aged 16 he joined his father as a lifeboatman, and in 1853 aged 25 he was appointed coxswain of the Lowestoft lifeboat which carried an annual salary of £80 plus other fees and payments. In the same year he married Charlotte Howard. Marriage certificate confirms Hook Howard marriage 24 Jul 1851 St Margaret's Lowestoft. Charlotte's sister Harriet married James Boast 1851.

In 1859 Hook was awarded the RNLI Silver Medal for rescuing in a heavy gale the crew of 14 from the steamer Shamrock on 1 November 1859. Hook received a second award clasp in 1873 for his part in rescuing the crew of 10 from the Norwegian vessel Expedite which had gone ashore on Holm Sand in a gale and had dismasted on 13 November 1872.

His wife Charlotte Hook died in 1879 aged 49, and in 1881 Hook married his widowed housekeeper, Mrs Sarah Ann Goldsmith, at the same time adopting her two children. For some years he was the innkeeper of the Fisherman's Arms public house in Lowestoft.

== As coxswain at Lowestoft ==
Robert Hook "saviour of more than two hundred lives" - illustration from The Graphic (1883)

On 28 October 1882 the Isis, William Thrift, Secret and other vessels were wrecked with great loss of life in the neighbourhood of Lowestoft during a heavy storm. The crew of the Lowestoft lifeboat 'Samuel Plimsoll' did not immediately launch their vessel to undertake a rescue, but Hook and his crew were eventually induced to launch their lifeboat and rescued 17 men. Their reluctance to launch was because they felt they had not been fairly treated during an incident earlier in the year when they had not been able to effect the rescue of a distressed fishing smack; however, a lifeboat from nearby Pakefield had managed to reach it resulting in the Lowestoft crew not getting their full pay allowance, which caused bitter resentment.

Hook was coxswain when on 14 November 1882, 25 men of the Lowestoft lifeboat rescued the eight-man crew of the barque Berthon following which each lifeboatman was awarded a silver medal as a reward for their bravery.

As coxswain during the incidents that had occurred on the evening of 28 October 1882, Hook was called before a Board of Inquiry held at Lowestoft on 13 to 16 December 1882 to explain why he was serving customers at his inn at the time the ships were being wrecked. He was questioned as to why the Lowestoft lifeboat did not proceed to render assistance to the Isis and other vessels before 11.30 p.m. on that day and then only after Hook had been confronted about the matter and after he and the crew had been offered a financial inducement to do so. In a scathing report, the Inquiry said of Hook: "...we are told that he has since then gone out, I think, on four separate occasions, and rendered good service in the saving of life. It cannot, however, be denied that Hook's conduct on and before the 28th of October in taking part with the beachmen has resulted in a great loss of life." Hook was subsequently dismissed from the service, having served 39 years with the RNLI at Lowestoft - 30 of them as coxswain.

In May 1883 Hook was among a contingent of ten Lowestoft fishermen who joined about 400 other fishermen from across Great Britain as guests at the International Fisheries Exhibition at South Kensington which was opened by the Prince of Wales. During their stay in London the fishermen were taken to Windsor Castle to view the state apartments and were entertained by Sir Henry Knight, the Lord Mayor of London at the Mansion House.

== Declining years ==
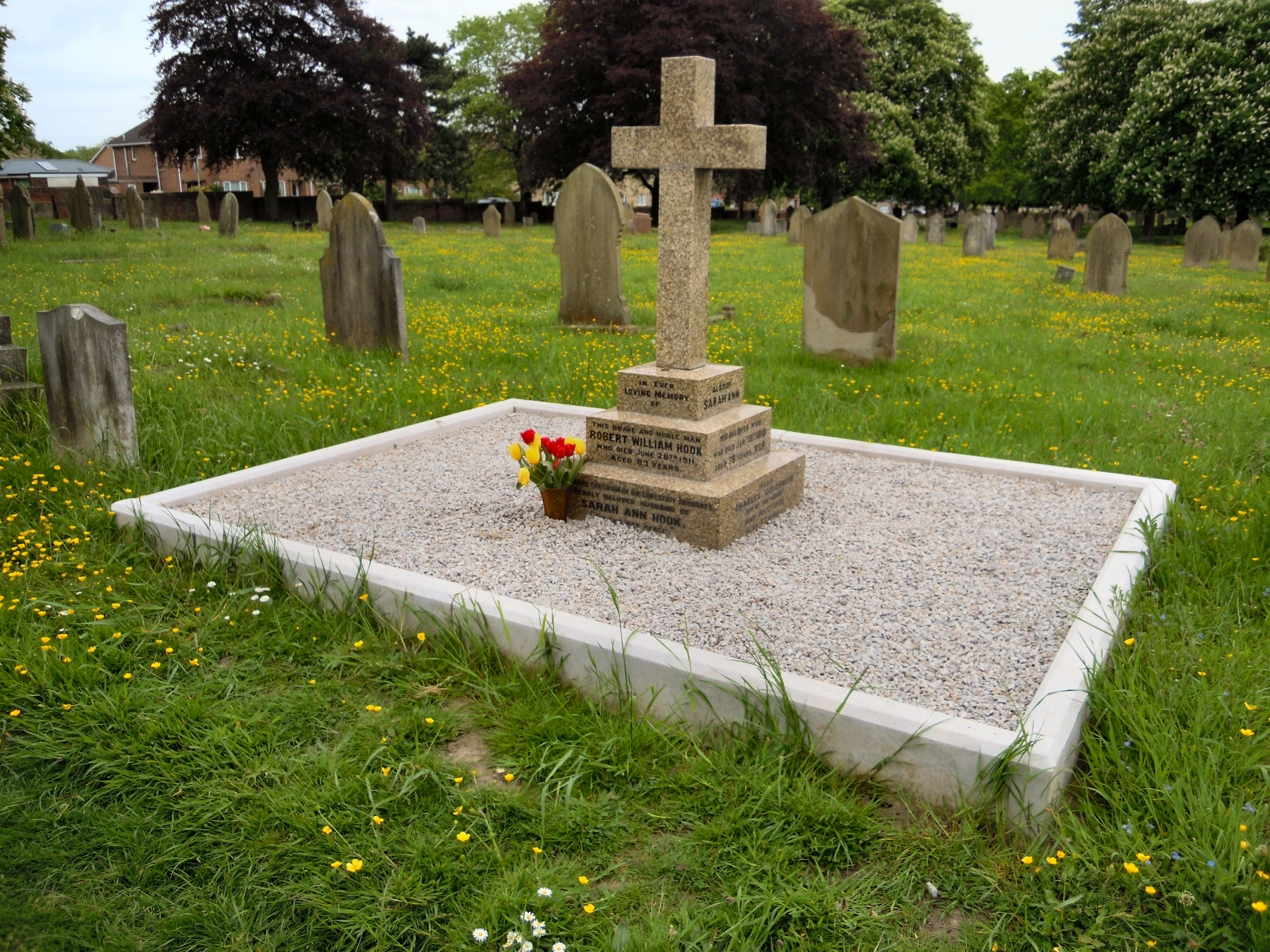
The grave of Robert William Hook in Lowestoft Cemetery

In January 1884 Hook put his public house the Fisherman's Arms up for sale, but not finding a buyer he carried on the business for another ten years. In 1892 he was among a number of lifeboatmen from Lowestoft who were each rewarded with a cash sum and a silver medal for saving the crew of the Austrian brig Osip 26 years earlier; the reason for the delay in receiving the reward was attributed to the fact that at the time of the rescue Austria was at war with Prussia and Italy and the matter was overlooked.

In the last months of his life Hook was bedridden and frail. He died at his home on 28 June 1911 aged 83. He was survived by his widow Sarah Ann Hook and his two adopted children. Among the mourners at his funeral were thirty of his fellow lifeboatmen wearing their distinctive cork jackets, eight of whom acted as pallbearers. The epitaph on his headstone reads "In Ever Loving Memory of This Brave and Noble Man".

Hook's obituary in the Lowestoft Journal wrote of him:

'Robert Hook, or, as everyone familiarly called him, Bob Hook, Lowestoft's great lifeboat hero, is dead! For months past the gnarled, weather beaten old sea warrior, of giant frame, he stood over 6ft. 3" and once of immense strength, has laid helpless as a child, and on Wednesday afternoon the 28th of June he passed peacefully away. His death being in vivid contrast with the strenuousness of his young days, when he was coxswain of the lifeboat, and when, with lion-hearted courage, and never daunted when the call came to save life, as he said "let the storm rage and the sea roar ever so fiercely". Bob Hook's active days have long been over - he was 84 years of age (sic) and it has been somewhat of a reproach that an effort was not made to render his declining years more comfortable. He has been able to get along, for he was very thrifty, but it would have been an act of grace and an acknowledgement of his splendid service if there had been some recognition'.
