= James Paget University Hospital =

- James Paget University Hospitals NHS Foundation Trust
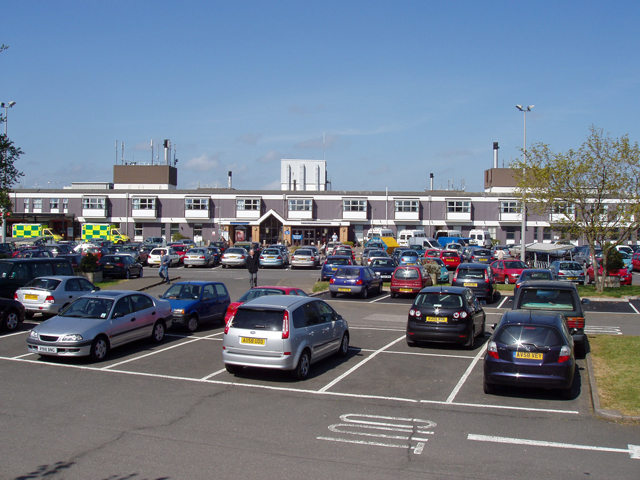
- James Paget University Hospital

- Location in Norfolk

Geography
- Location: Lowestoft Road, Gorleston-on-Sea, Great Yarmouth, Norfolk NR31 6LA, England
- Coordinates: 52.5617°N 1.7177°E

Organisation
- Care system: National Health Service
- Type: Teaching
- Affiliated university: University of East Anglia and University of Suffolk

Services
- Emergency department: Yes
- Beds: Approximately 500
- Speciality: Acute Care

History
- Founded: 21 July 1982; 43 years ago

Links
- Website: www.jpaget.nhs.uk

James Paget University Hospital is at Gorleston-on-Sea, Great Yarmouth, Norfolk, England, on the A47 Lowestoft Road. It is managed by the James Paget University Hospitals NHS Foundation Trust.

== History ==
The hospital, which replaced Great Yarmouth General Hospital and Gorleston-on-Sea Cottage Hospital, opened on 21 July 1982. It was named after Sir James Paget an English surgeon and pathologist who was born in Great Yarmouth and is best remembered for naming Paget's disease.

The Louise Hamilton Centre, which was built to provide palliative care for people with cancer and other life-limiting and progressive illnesses, was officially opened by Princess Anne in April 2013.

== Services ==
James Paget University Hospital provides a full range of clinical services for a population of 230,000 residents across Great Yarmouth, Lowestoft, and Waveney.

== Performance ==
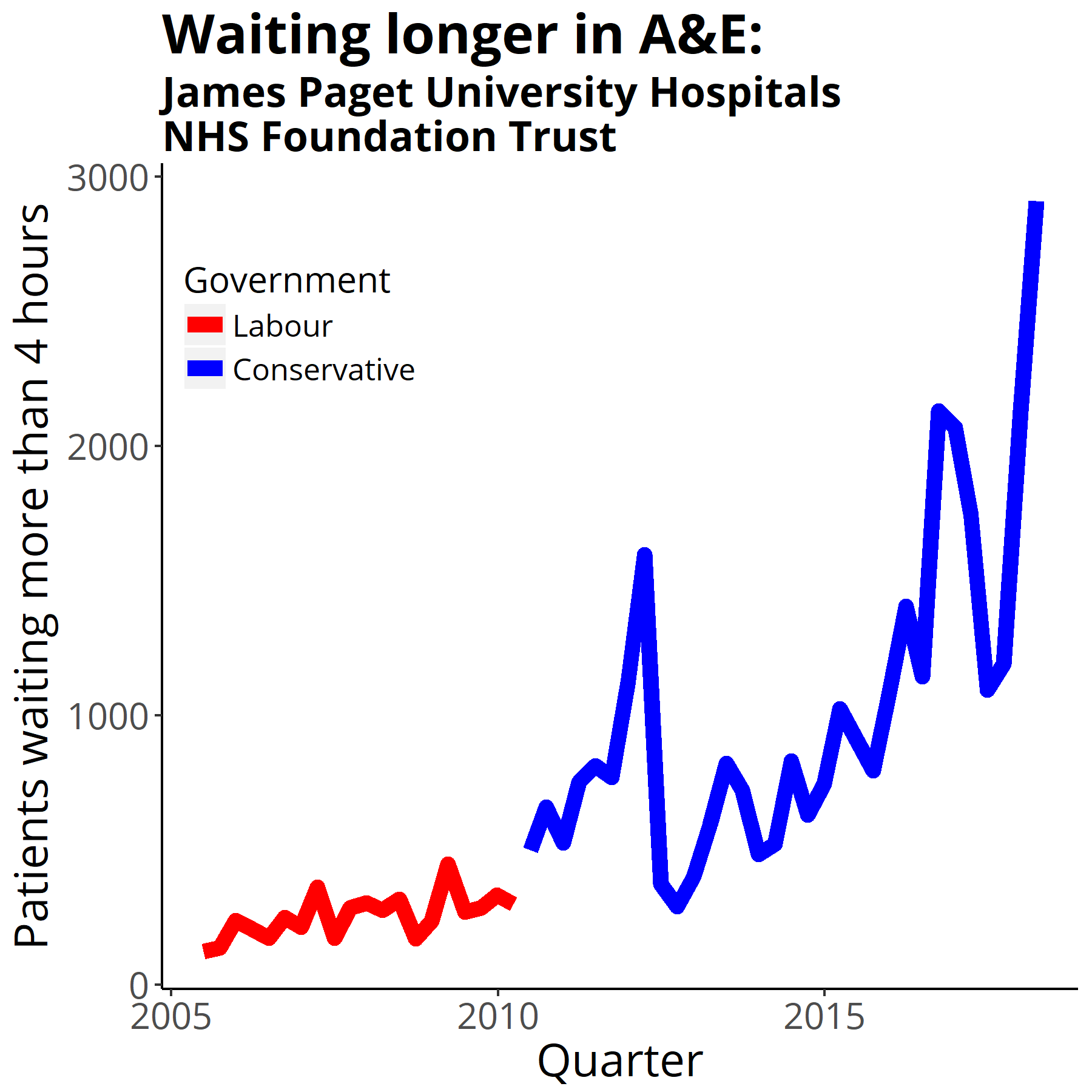
Four-hour target in the emergency department quarterly figures from NHS England Data from https://www.england.nhs.uk/statistics/statistical-work-areas/ae-waiting-times-and-activity/

In March 2007, there was an outbreak of Clostridioides difficile at the hospital which killed 17 people. In December 2010 and into 2011, the hospital was put on black alert as it saw a rise in patient numbers. Patients were urged to relieve pressure on the hospital by seeking treatment elsewhere such as at pharmacies, GP surgeries and Minor Injury Units.

In March 2011, the hospital had an outbreak of group A streptococcal infection which resulted in the death of a patient. As a preventative measure, staff and patients were screened. In June 2011, a Care Quality Commission inspection found that the hospital was in the moderate concern category with respect to meeting the needs of some patients in nutritional and patient dignity standards. The inspection followed allegations that the care of some elderly patients was lacking in some respects earlier during the year. In August 2012 the Care Quality Commission published a report mentioning one remaining minor concern about the hospital's record-keeping. Compliance in record-keeping meant that the hospital was now fully compliant on all the care standards.

The Trust was named by the Health Service Journal as one of the top hundred NHS trusts to work for in 2015. At that time, it had 2511 full-time equivalent staff and a sickness absence rate of 3.25%. 65% of staff recommend it as a place for treatment and 64% recommended it as a place to work.

== See also ==
- List of hospitals in England
- List of NHS trusts in England
