= Lowestoft =

Town and civil parish in Suffolk, England

Coordinates: 52°29′N 1°45′E

- Town and civil parish
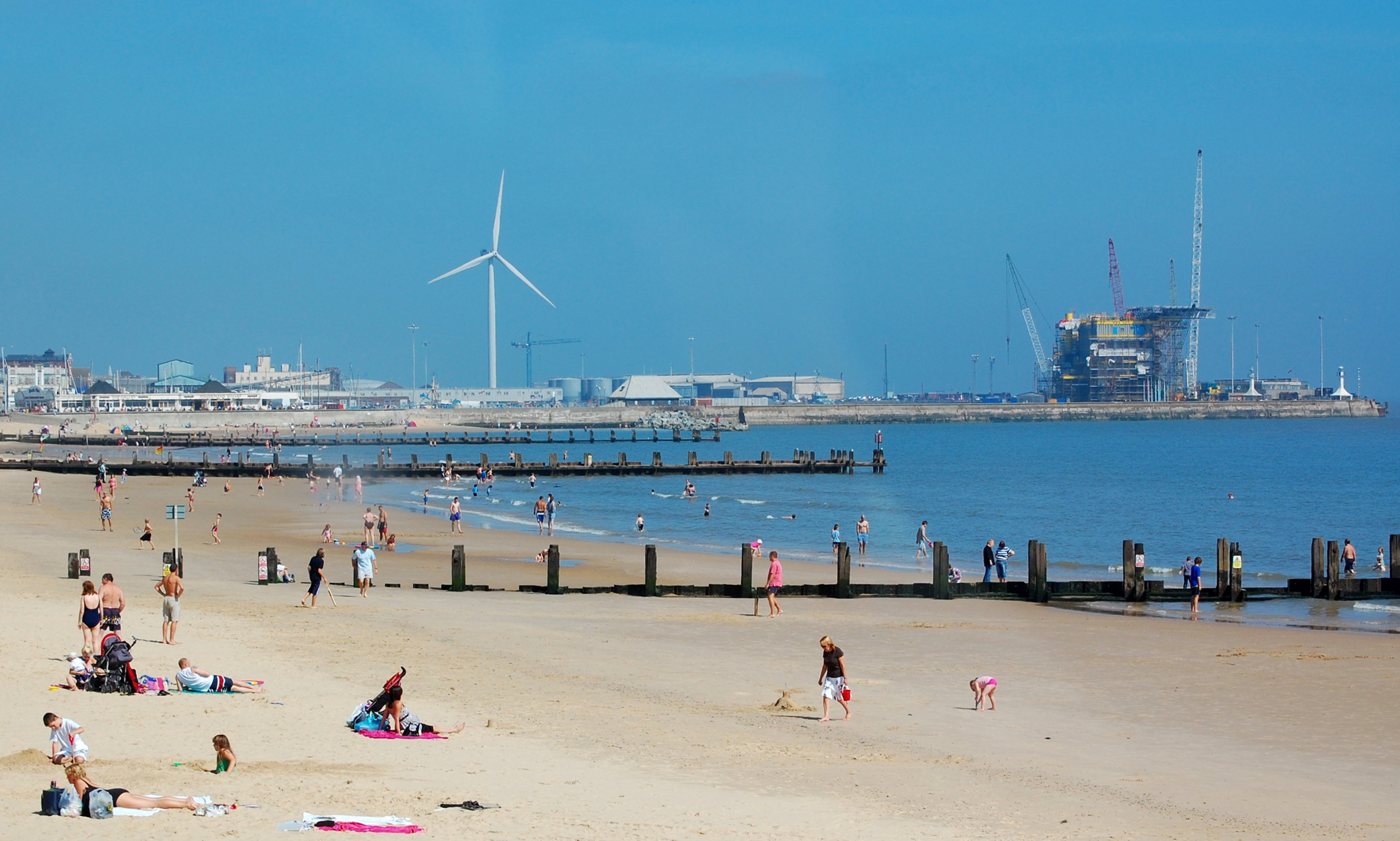
- Lowestoft beach and outer harbour in 2007

- Location within Suffolk
- Area: 21.43 km^{2} (8.27 sq mi)
- Population: 71,327 (2021 census) (Note: The population of the built-up area, including Carlton Colville, Oulton Broad and Oulton parishes.)
  - Density: 3,328/km^{2} (8,620/sq mi)
- OS grid reference: TM548933
  - London: 110 mi (180 km) south-west
- Civil parish: Lowestoft
- District: East Suffolk
- Shire county: Suffolk
- Region: East
- Country: England
- Sovereign state: United Kingdom
- Areas of the town: List: Carlton Colville (Town); Corton (Village); Gunton; Kirkley; Lowestoft End; Normanston; Oulton Broad; Pakefield
- Post town: Lowestoft
- Postcode district: NR32, NR33
- Dialling code: 01502
- Police: Suffolk
- Fire: Suffolk
- Ambulance: East of England
- UK Parliament: Lowestoft
- Website: Lowestoft Town Council

Lowestoft (/ˈloʊ(ɪ)stɒft, ˈloʊstəf/ LOH-(ih)-stoft, LOH-stəf) is a coastal town and civil parish in the East Suffolk district of Suffolk, England. As the most easterly UK settlement, it is 38 miles (61 km) north-east of Ipswich and 22 miles (35 km) south-east of Norwich, and the main town in its district. Its development grew with the fishing industry and as a seaside resort with wide sandy beaches. As fishing declined, oil and gas exploitation in the North Sea in the 1960s took over. In 2021 the built-up area had a population of 71,327 and the parish had a population of 47,879.

== History ==
=== Prehistory and early settlement ===
Some of the earliest signs of settlement in Britain have been found in Lowestoft. Flint tools discovered in 2005 in the cliffs at Pakefield, south Lowestoft, show that humans inhabited the area as far back as 700,000 years.

Habitation occurred in the Neolithic, Bronze and Iron ages and in the Roman and Saxon times. Several finds have been made at a Saxon cemetery at Bloodmoor Hill in south Lowestoft.

The place name derives from a Norse personal name, Hlothver, and toft, an Old Norse word for homestead. Over time, it has been spelled Lothnwistoft, Lothuwistoft, Lestoffe, Laistoe, Loystoft and Laystoft.

=== Domesday Book and Norman period ===
The 1086 Domesday Book gives Lothuwistoft village some 16 households in three families, with ten smallholders and three slaves. The manor formed part of the king's holding in the Hundred of Lothingland, worth about four geld in tax income. Roger Bigod was the tenant in chief. The lost village of Akethorpe may have lain close by.

=== Medieval period ===
In the Middle Ages, Lowestoft became an important fishing town that came to challenge its neighbour, Great Yarmouth. The trade, particularly for herring, continued as the town's main identity into the 20th century.

=== Early modern period ===
In the First English Civil War Lowestoft's sympathies were Royalist partly due to her commercial rivalry with the Parliamentarian Great Yarmouth and in 1643 was seized by Royalist sympathisers, who were defeated and captured by Eastern Association troops led by Oliver Cromwell, the only civil war battle in Suffolk. The naval Battle of Lowestoft in June 1665 was the first in the Second Anglo-Dutch War. Held 40 miles (64 km) off the coast, it was a victory for the English.

=== Eighteenth century ===
Lowestoft Porcelain Factory, from 1757 to 1802, was in production for longer than any English soft-paste porcelain manufacturer other than Royal Worcester and Royal Crown Derby, producing domestic pots, teapots and jugs. It stood on the site of an existing pottery or brick kiln and was later used as a brewery and malt kiln. Most of its remaining buildings were demolished in 1955.

=== Nineteenth century ===
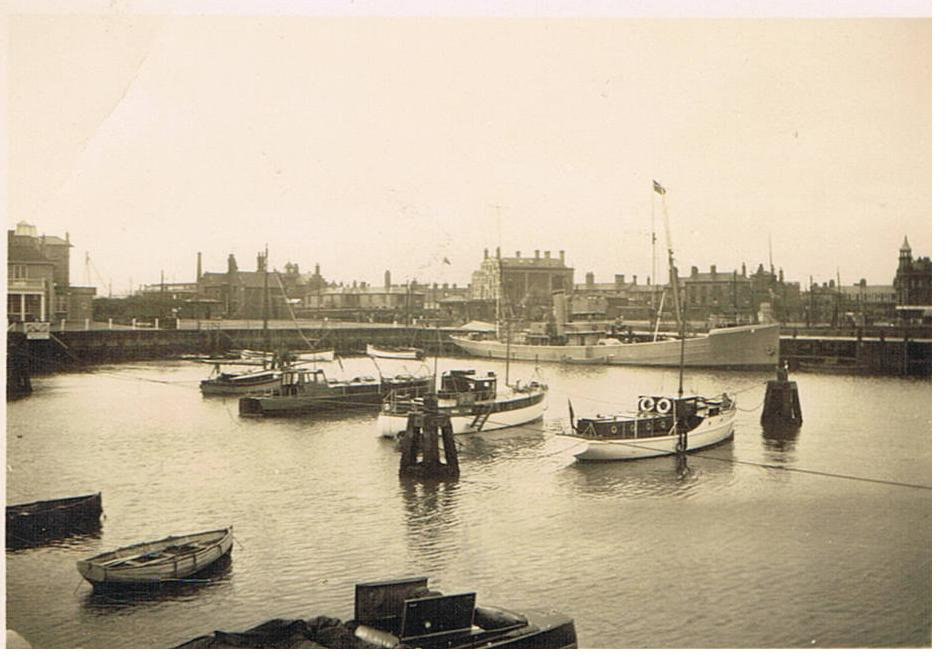
Lowestoft's Yacht Basin in 1929

Sir Samuel Morton Peto's arrival in 19th-century Lowestoft brought a change in the town's fortunes, including its fishing industry. To help stimulate this, Peto was given the task of building a line for the Lowestoft Railway and Harbour Company, connecting with Reedham and the city of Norwich. This had a profound impact on the town's industrial development – its fishing fleets could sell to markets further inland, and other industries such as engineering gained from increased trade with the continent. Peto's railway enabled Lowestoft to become a flourishing seaside holiday resort; much of Peto's seaside resort in south Lowestoft still exists, including the Grade II listed Kirkley Cliff and Wellington Esplanade terraces.

=== World Wars ===
During World War I, Lowestoft was bombarded by the German Navy on 24 April 1916 in conjunction with the Easter Rising. The port was a major naval base during the war, including for armed trawlers such as Ethel & Millie and Nelson used to combat German U-boat actions in the North Sea such as that of 15 August 1917. In World War II the town was heavily bombed by the Luftwaffe for its engineering industry and role as a naval base. It is sometimes placed among the UK's most heavily bombed towns per head of population. The Royal Naval Patrol Service was mobilised in August 1939, mainly by trawlermen and fishermen of the Royal Naval Reserve. Its depot, HMS Europa, was also known locally as the Sparrow's Nest.

== Governance ==
Lowestoft is the major settlement in the East Suffolk district. In 1885 Lowestoft became a municipal borough which became part of the administrative county of East Suffolk in 1889, the district contained the parish of Lowestoft, from 1890 to 1907 the district also contained the parish of Kirkley. On 1 April 1974 the district and parish were abolished and became part of Waveney in the non-metropolitan county of Suffolk. In 2008, a Government Boundary Committee proposed that Lowestoft become part of Norfolk, but this proposal was met with strong opposition from residents, and Lowestoft remained in Suffolk. It retained a ceremonial mayor elected annually by its district councillors and acting as charter trustees until 2017. Suffolk County Council is the county authority. A civil parish of Lowestoft was created on 1 April 2017, governed by Lowestoft Town Council, which elects a town mayor annually. The town is part of the Lowestoft parliamentary constituency.

Before 1 April 2019, Lowestoft, as part of Waveney District Council, was divided into ten electoral wards, with Carlton Colville treated as a separate electoral area. Harbour, Kirkley, Normanston, Pakefield, St Margarets and Whitton wards elected three councillors each, and Carlton, Gunton and Corton, Oulton and Oulton Broad wards two. Of the 48 council seats in the district, 26 represented wards within Lowestoft and three were in Carlton Colville. In 2010 the council changed to a system of all seats being elected every four years.

On 1 April 2019, governance arrangements for Lowestoft changed with the merger of Waveney and Suffolk Coastal District Councils to form a new district council of East Suffolk. Elections were held on 2 May 2019 for the six new Lowestoft wards. The seats, fourteen in all, are allocated to Carlton and Whitton (2), Gunton and St. Margarets (2), Harbour and Normanston (3), Kirkley and Pakefield (3), Lothingland (1), and Oulton Broad (3). There are also changes to wards adjacent to Lowestoft. After the inaugural 2019 East Suffolk District Council election of 2 May, eight of the fourteen Lowestoft seats over the six new wards went to the Conservatives and six to Labour.

On Suffolk County Council, Lowestoft and its district are represented by eight councillors, split equally between four divisions: Gunton, Lowestoft South, Oulton and Pakefield. For county council elections, held every four years, Pakefield division includes Carlton Colville. After the 2017 election, seven of Lowestoft's county councillors represented the Conservatives and one Labour. In 2018, one Conservative councillor left the party and became an Independent.

== Geography and climate ==
Lowestoft

Climate chart (precipitation, max. and min. temperature)
| J | F | M | A | M | J | J | A | S | O | N | D |
| 51 7 2 | 35 7 2 | 40 9 3 | 42 11 5 | 40 14 8 | 47 18 11 | 44 20 13 | 51 21 13 | 53 18 11 | 58 14 8 | 61 10 5 | 55 8 3 |
- █ Average max. and min. temperatures in °C
- █ Precipitation totals in mm
- Source: Met Office
Imperial conversion
| J | F | M | A | M | J | J | A | S | O | N | D |
| 2 44 35 | 1.4 44 35 | 1.6 49 38 | 1.6 52 41 | 1.6 58 46 | 1.9 64 51 | 1.7 68 55 | 2 69 56 | 2.1 65 52 | 2.3 57 47 | 2.4 50 40 | 2.2 46 37 |
- █ Average max. and min. temperatures in °F
- █ Precipitation totals in inches

Lowestoft, the easternmost town in the United Kingdom, lies on the North Sea coast. The town is divided by Lake Lothing, which forms the inner part of Lowestoft Harbour and gives access via Oulton Broad and Oulton Dyke to the River Waveney and the Broads. The northern half is on the island of Lothingland.

Lowestoft is mainly low-lying, with hilly areas in the north and high points of 20–30 m (66–98 ft) above sea level. The rock beneath is crag-sand with overlying sand and glacial till deposits with gravel, with the crag exposed at coastal cliffs such as Pakefield's. Areas around Lake Lothing feature alluvium silt; some marshland remains west of Oulton Broad. The sandy beaches south of the harbour have Blue Flag status. To the north of the harbour is an area of old sand dunes known as the Denes, along with more beaches and Ness Point, the easternmost point of the UK.

Lowestoft has been subject to periodic flooding, notably in January 1953, when a North Sea swell driven by low pressure and an extreme high tide swept away many earlier sea defences and deluged most of the southern town. Heavy rain caused flash flooding in the town in September 2006. In December 2013, a storm surge caused severe flooding of Lowestoft and its suburbs.

Lowestoft is among the UK's driest areas: annual rainfall averages under 600 mm distributed fairly evenly through the year. Mean daily summer temperatures peak at 21 °C in August, when the town averages over 200 hours of sunshine, while in winter minima average 2 °C. Marked snowfall is rare. Sea fog and cool onshore breezes can affect the town.

Climate data for Lowestoft, elevation: 15 m (49 ft), 1991–2020 normals, extremes 1889–2010
| Month | Jan | Feb | Mar | Apr | May | Jun | Jul | Aug | Sep | Oct | Nov | Dec | Year |
|---|---|---|---|---|---|---|---|---|---|---|---|---|---|
| Record high °C (°F) | 14.4 (57.9) | 17.0 (62.6) | 21.7 (71.1) | 23.9 (75.0) | 26.8 (80.2) | 30.0 (86.0) | 32.4 (90.3) | 30.8 (87.4) | 27.8 (82.0) | 24.6 (76.3) | 19.4 (66.9) | 15.2 (59.4) | 32.4 (90.3) |
| Mean daily maximum °C (°F) | 7.2 (45.0) | 7.6 (45.7) | 9.8 (49.6) | 12.7 (54.9) | 15.7 (60.3) | 18.7 (65.7) | 21.1 (70.0) | 21.2 (70.2) | 18.6 (65.5) | 14.7 (58.5) | 10.6 (51.1) | 7.8 (46.0) | 13.8 (56.9) |
| Daily mean °C (°F) | 4.9 (40.8) | 5.0 (41.0) | 6.8 (44.2) | 9.3 (48.7) | 12.2 (54.0) | 15.1 (59.2) | 17.5 (63.5) | 17.6 (63.7) | 15.3 (59.5) | 12.0 (53.6) | 8.1 (46.6) | 5.5 (41.9) | 10.8 (51.4) |
| Mean daily minimum °C (°F) | 2.6 (36.7) | 2.4 (36.3) | 3.8 (38.8) | 5.8 (42.4) | 8.7 (47.7) | 11.4 (52.5) | 13.8 (56.8) | 14.0 (57.2) | 11.9 (53.4) | 9.2 (48.6) | 5.5 (41.9) | 3.1 (37.6) | 7.7 (45.8) |
| Record low °C (°F) | −11.2 (11.8) | −11.7 (10.9) | −8.9 (16.0) | −3.6 (25.5) | −1.7 (28.9) | 0.6 (33.1) | 3.9 (39.0) | 3.9 (39.0) | 1.1 (34.0) | −2.8 (27.0) | −6.1 (21.0) | −10.0 (14.0) | −11.7 (10.9) |
| Average precipitation mm (inches) | 51.1 (2.01) | 43.7 (1.72) | 40.0 (1.57) | 34.7 (1.37) | 50.0 (1.97) | 49.5 (1.95) | 57.6 (2.27) | 63.9 (2.52) | 55.7 (2.19) | 68.8 (2.71) | 65.1 (2.56) | 59.9 (2.36) | 640 (25.2) |
| Average precipitation days (≥ 1.0 mm) | 11.2 | 9.8 | 8.7 | 8.2 | 7.3 | 8.6 | 8.9 | 8.7 | 8.6 | 11.5 | 12.8 | 12.2 | 117.4 |
| Mean monthly sunshine hours | 52.8 | 79.6 | 121.8 | 186.3 | 208.5 | 191.7 | 200.3 | 202.7 | 156.4 | 111.1 | 63.2 | 44.4 | 1,618.8 |
Source 1: Met Office
Source 2: KNMI

== Demography ==
Lowestoft is Suffolk's second largest town, after Ipswich, with an estimated population of 58,560 in 2010. The wider urban area brought the estimated population of the built-up area to 73,755 in 2018 from 68,850 at the 2001 census. The town's wider urban area includes the suburbs and villages of Carlton Colville, Gunton, Pakefield, Oulton, Oulton Broad and Kirkley. Other outlying villages in the urban area include Blundeston, Corton, Gisleham, Kessingland and Somerleyton.

About 10 per cent of the area population at the 2001 census was aged 75 or over and 20 per cent under 16. In general the population of several wards is slightly skewed towards the elderly. The population is mainly classed as "white", with minority ethnicities making up 1.4 per cent, compared with 8.7 per cent nationally.

At the 2001 census there were 27,777 households, giving an average household size of 2.40. In total 8,430 (30 per cent) were classified as one-person households, while 26 per cent included children aged 15 or under. The proportion of households without a private car was 29 per cent, whilst 22 per cent had two or more. In housing tenure, 72 per cent of homes were owner-occupied.

== Economy ==
Originally based on fishing and engineering, the economy of Lowestoft has declined over the years. Although the tourism sector has grown, the major employers in the town are the wholesale and retail sector, with 18 per cent of employment.

Service industries, including health, social care and education are significant employers, while manufacturing employs about 10 per cent of the workforce.

Employment can vary seasonally due to the importance of tourism to the economy. In early 2011, around 10 per cent of the working population of the town claimed Jobseekers Allowance.

=== Traditional industries ===
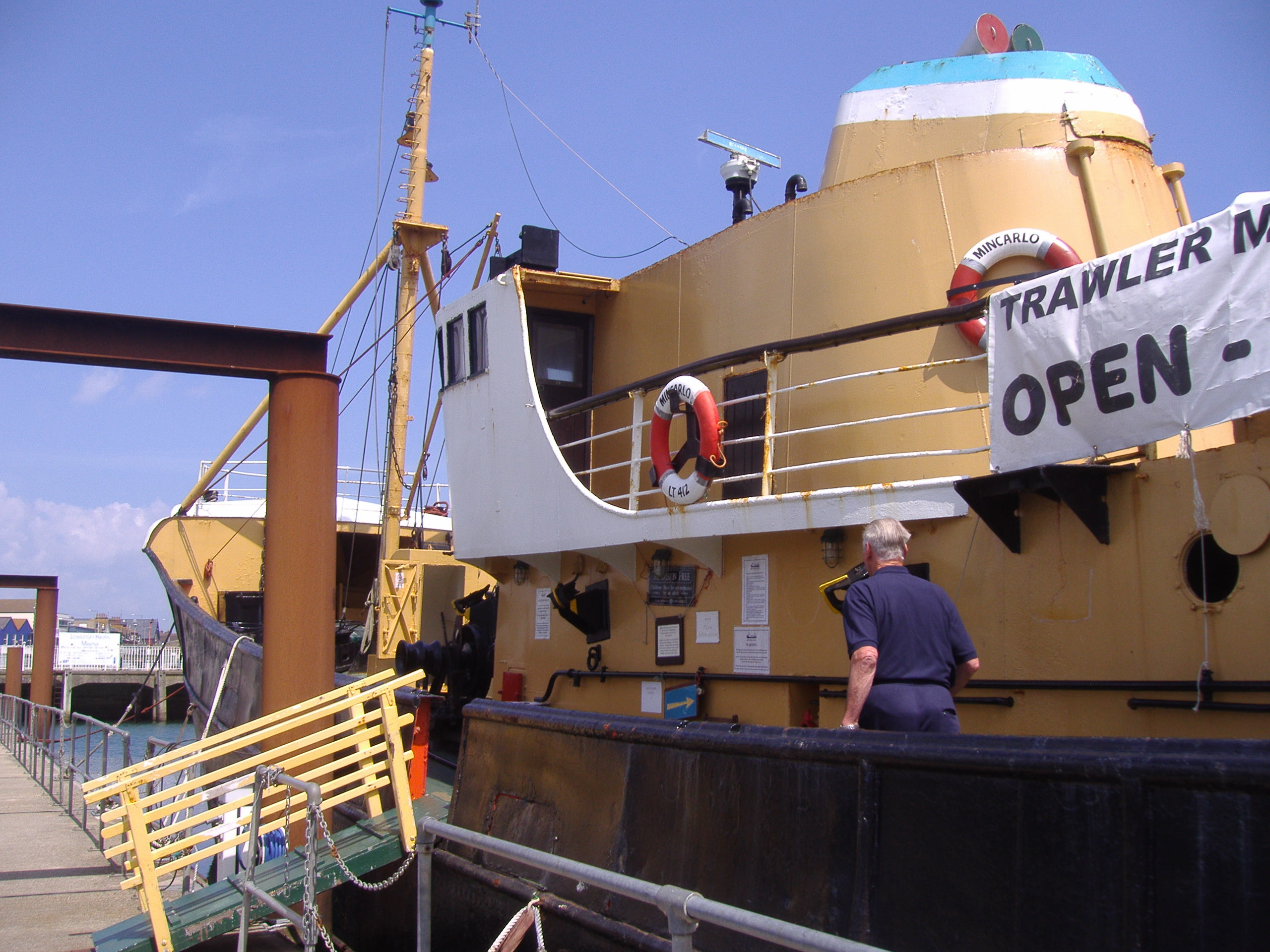
Traditional trawler, the Mincarlo, now a museum ship

Until the mid-1960s, fishing was seen as Lowestoft's main industry, although from the 1930s the percentage so employed directly and in trades associated with fishing was actually only about 10 per cent. Fleets of drifters and trawlers caught fish such as herring, cod and plaice. Catches have diminished since the 1960s and although 100 boats remained by the 1980s, there are now only a few small boats operating out of Lowestoft, with no large trawlers. By 2011 just three traders remained at the town's fish market, which is under threat of closure due to redevelopment of the port. The Centre for Environment, Fisheries and Aquaculture Science (CEFAS), a large fisheries research centre that is a part of Defra, is still located in Lowestoft.

Other major traditional employers included Eastern Coach Works and engineering and shipbuilding companies clustered around the harbour. These included the Brooke Marine and Richards shipbuilding companies, which together employed over a thousand men but went out of business in the 1990s, and the Norwich-based engineering company Boulton and Paul. Some shipbuilding and repair still goes on at the harbour.

=== Modern economy ===
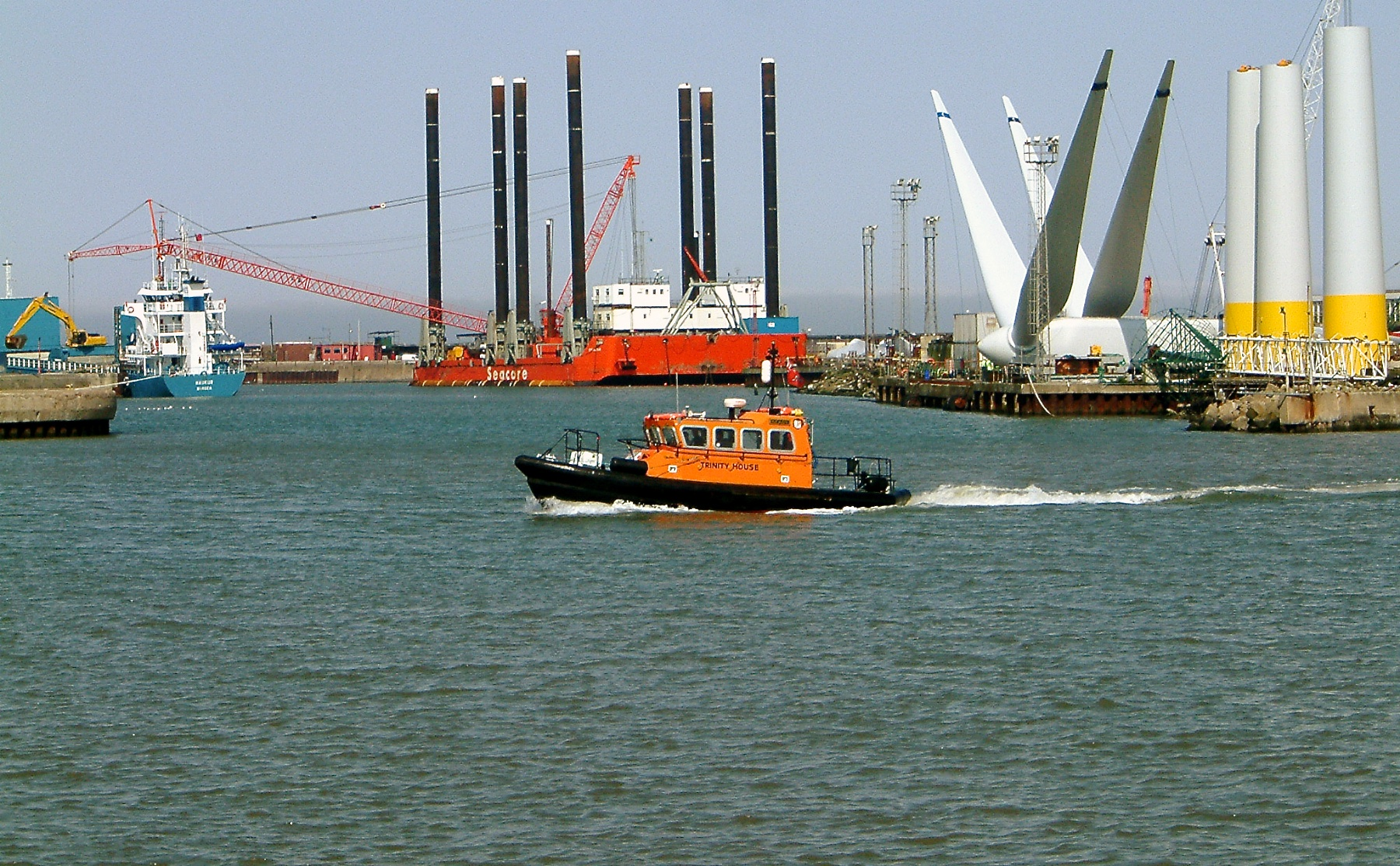
Windfarm construction in Lowestoft harbour

Major local employers include Birds Eye frozen foods, with 700 workers. This has been located in the town for over 60 years. The food-processing company Wessex Foods closed its Lowestoft plant in 2010 after a fire destroyed the factory and it failed to find alternative premises.

Several other employers have shed labour in recent years. The Sanyo plant in the town closed down in 2009 with a loss of 60 jobs, having once employed 800. The timber company Jeld-Wen closed its factory in the town in 2010.

From the mid-1960s to the late 1990s, the oil and gas industry provided significant employment in the area. For many years the Shell Southern Operations base on the north shore of Lowestoft Harbour was town's largest employer. A decision to close the Shell base was finally made in 2003. Oil and gas is still a major industry.

The town has made efforts to develop as a centre for renewable energy in the east of England. The non-profit Orbis Energy centre has been set up to draw business in the green-energy sector and features solar thermal heating. In April 2009, Associated British Ports announced that the harbour is to become the operations centre for the 500 MW Greater Gabbard wind farm, which when completed will be the world's largest offshore windfarm. The turbines will be located 15 miles (24 km) off the Suffolk coast and the Outer Harbour will be used to house the necessary operational support facilities. Other developments in the renewable energy sector include a prototype tidal energy generator being produced by local company 4NRG and wave power systems developed by Trident Energy.

Hoseasons (now part of Awaze), a specialist in self-catering UK holidays, is also a large employment provider.

=== Retailing ===
The town centre is the main shopping area in Waveney district. The retail chain Marks & Spencer has a store. Chadds independent department store was founded in 1907, and after nearly 100 years trading in the High Street, was taken over in 2004 by the Great Yarmouth-based Palmers group. Specialist shopping areas, branded as The Historic High Street and the Triangle Market Place, have been developed on the northern edge of the centre. Several retail parks have appeared, the largest being North Quay Retail Park in Peto Way.

=== Tourism ===
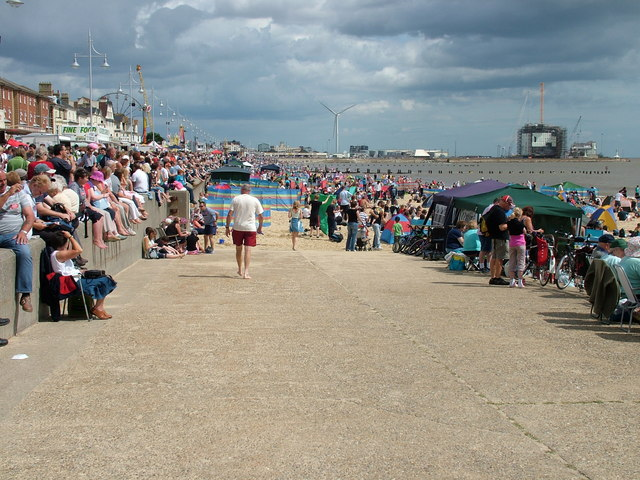
Lowestoft beach at the airshow

Lowestoft is a traditional seaside resort, first developed as a bathing site in the 1760s. The coast has been called the "Sunrise Coast". The town's main beaches are south of the harbour, where two piers, the Claremont and South piers, provide tourist facilities, and the East Point Pavilion the tourist information service. The beach south of the Claremont Pier is a Blue Flag beach. Lifeguard facilities are provided during the summer and water sports take place along the coast. Tourism is a significant aspect of the town's economy.

The town features two major attractions, the first being Pleasurewood Hills Theme Park, situated on the northern edge of the town, while the second is the Africa Alive! wildlife park, situated in the south at Kessingland. The town maintains a holiday park at Pakefield, operated by Pontins, and a small caravan site near its northern beach. The natural attractions of the Broads and the River Waveney on the west edge of the town, also attract visitors and been the site for boat trips and water sports events, with companies such as Hoseasons operating hire boats from Oulton Broad.

Between 1996 and 2012, the town hosted a major air show during the summer, dubbed the Lowestoft Airshow. A major attraction, the two-day event took place in August, and featuring a wide range of aircraft including the Red Arrows, a Lancaster bomber, Spitfires and an Avro Vulcan. From 2004, it was run by Lowestoft Seafront Air Festival Ltd, a non-profit company, but suffered financial difficulties. In 2010, the event made a loss of £40,000 and raised concerns over its sustainability, whereupon further financial difficulties coupled with bad weather and low visitor numbers made the 2012 airshow the last before it was discontinued.

Near the town centre is Lowestoft Maritime Museum, open from late April to late October, which has exhibits of maritime artefacts, an extensive collection of ship models and medals, marine art, fishing and the fishing industry, activities with the Royal Navy in WWII, and shipwrights' and coopers' tools.

=== Redevelopment ===
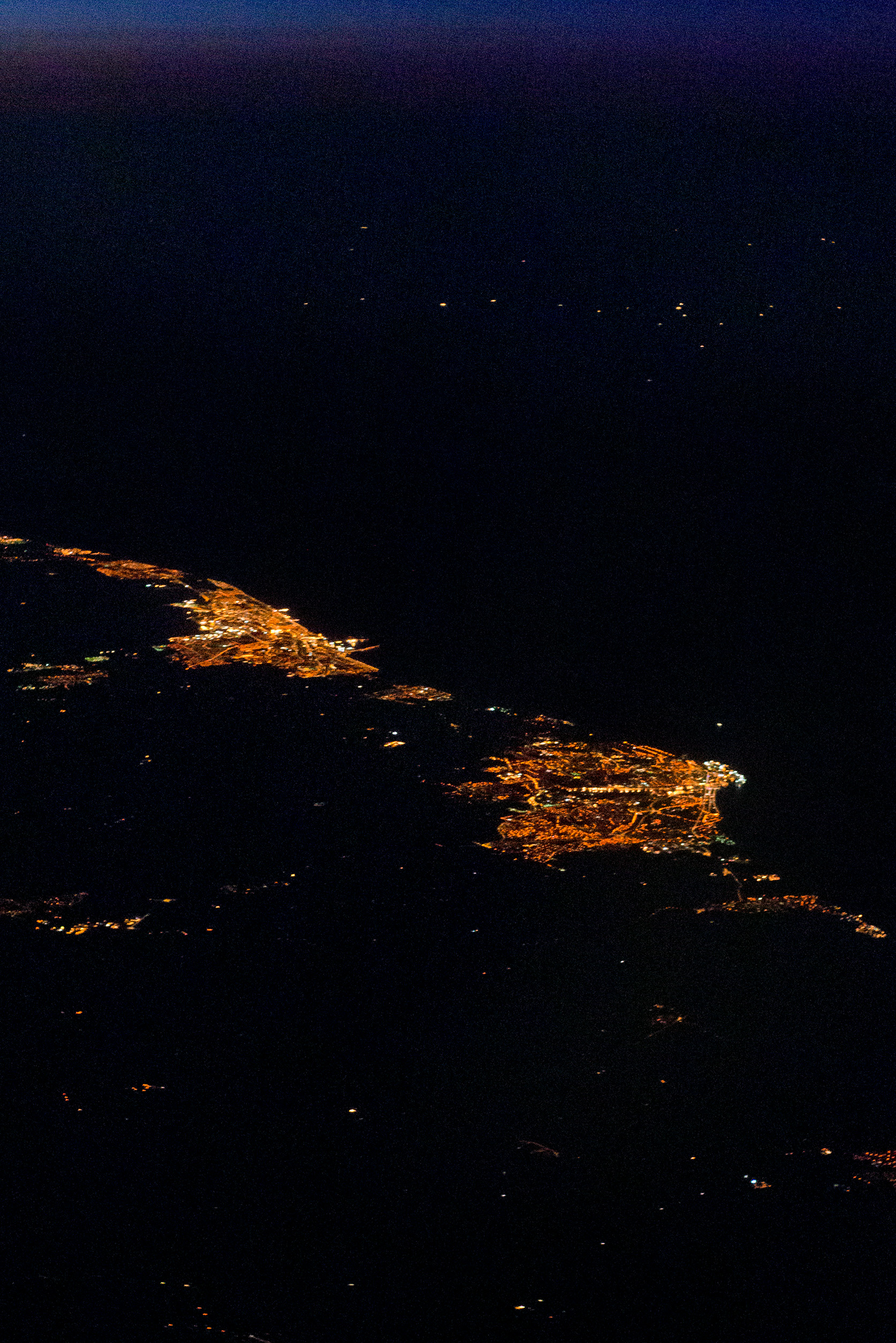
Lowestoft (right) and Great Yarmouth (left) at night

Lowestoft is among the more socially deprived areas in Suffolk, with Kirkley the county's most deprived ward, ranking 173rd most deprived in England out of 32,486. The area attracted European Union redevelopment funding. The Waveney Sunrise Scheme invested £14.7 million, funding transport improvements and tourist facilities such as fountains on Royal Plain, as stimulants. Regeneration company 1st East, which focused on the Lowestoft and Great Yarmouth areas, closed in 2011.

Great Yarmouth and Lowestoft Enterprise Zone was announced in 2011 and launched in April 2012. The zone, developed by New Anglia Local Enterprise Partnership, has six redevelopment sites across Lowestoft and Great Yarmouth. The bid for the zone in 2011 envisaged creating 13,500 jobs by 2036. It involved the Norfolk and Suffolk Energy Alliance and focused on developing the energy sector initially using tax incentives, simplified planning regulations and the provision of improved broadband internet services. The sites in Lowestoft are Mobbs Way, Riverside Road and South Lowestoft Industrial Estate.

Associated British Ports, the operator of the Port of Lowestoft, published their Lowestoft Masterplan, which aims to regenerate the harbour and take advantage of renewable energy, including the new Lowestoft Eastern Energy Facility (LEEF) on the former SLP land at the outer harbour amongst other projects. The harbour is a focus of redevelopment proposals for Lowestoft through the Lake Lothing and Outer Harbour Area Action Plan, submitted in February 2011. The plan focuses on the redevelopment of brownfield sites in and around the harbour area to create jobs, particularly in the renewable energy and retailing sectors.

== Culture and community ==
The town has three theatres: the Marina, the Players (Lowestoft) and The Seagull. The 800-seat Marina, operated as a charitable trust, was restored and refurbished in 2012 and its cinema upgraded to digital in 2013. The Royal Philharmonic Orchestra has played regularly at the Marina Theatre since 2005.

Lowestoft Museum, which holds a collection of Lowestoft Porcelain and artifacts describing the town's history, is in Nicholas Everett Park in Oulton Broad. There are some small museums in Sparrow's Nest Park in the north of the town, including the Lowestoft War Memorial Museum, the Maritime Museum and the Royal Naval Patrol Service Museum. The Heritage Workshop Centre is also located there. The Mincarlo, the last surviving sidewinder trawler of the Lowestoft fishing fleet, can be visited at Lowestoft Harbour. The East Anglia Transport Museum holds a collection of buses, trams and trolleybuses in Carlton Colville.

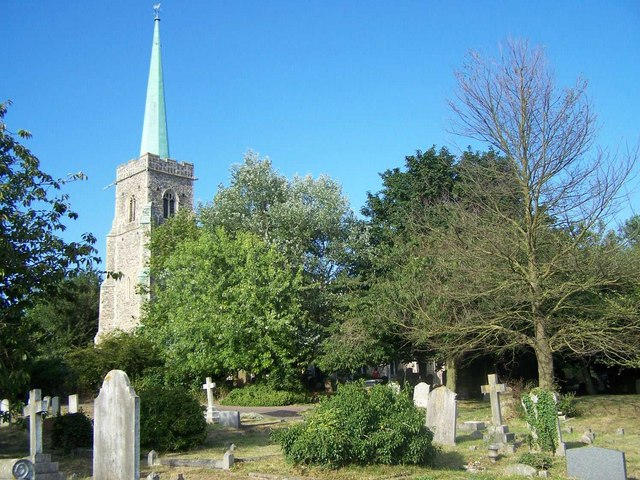
St. Margaret's Church, Lowestoft

Lowestoft retains several narrow lanes with steps running steeply seawards, known locally as "scores". They were used by fishermen and smugglers and now feature in an annual charity race. The borough church, dedicated to St Margaret, is a Grade I listed building. In the town centre is Our Lady Star of the Sea Church, a Grade II listed building in the Arts and Crafts style and the most easterly Catholic church in the British Isles.

Lowestoft's town-centre library contains a local-history section and a branch of the Suffolk Record Office. Lowestoft Hospital closed in 2016. Services are now provided by the James Paget University Hospital in Gorleston. The main burial grounds for the town are Lowestoft Cemetery and Kirkley Cemetery. The town is twinned with the town of Plaisir in the Yvelines department in the Île-de-France to the west of Paris.

== Landmarks ==
=== Ness Point ===
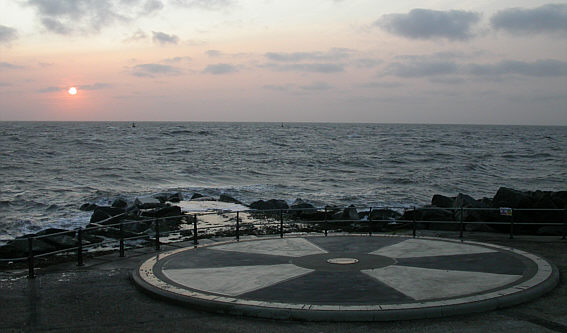
Ness Point at Sunrise

Ness Point, the easternmost location in the United Kingdom, is located in the town close to a 126-metre wind turbine, known locally as Gulliver. At the time it was completed it was the country's tallest.

At the most easterly point is a large compass rose, the Euroscope, set in the ground to give the direction and distance to various cities in Europe.

=== Sparrows Nest ===
Belle Vue Park (Sparrows Nest) is the site of the Royal Naval Patrol Service memorial. The central depot for the service was in Lowestoft when it was mobilised in August 1939, on a site known as Sparrow's Nest, adjacent to the memorial. The memorial has the names of the 2,385 members of the service who died in World War II. Prior to this, it was the site of the "North Battery", which stood on the cliff and was constructed in around 1782. It was a four sided bastion set back from the cliff edge, housing four 18-pounder cannon, with a guardhouse and magazine to the rear. All traces are now gone, minus two cannons with are now mounted around the memorial.

=== Lighthouse ===
Lowestoft Lighthouse, built in 1874 to the north of the town centre, stands 16 metres high at 37 metres above sea level, with a range of 23 nautical miles (43 km). It was automated in 1975. It is the United Kingdom's most easterly lighthouse.

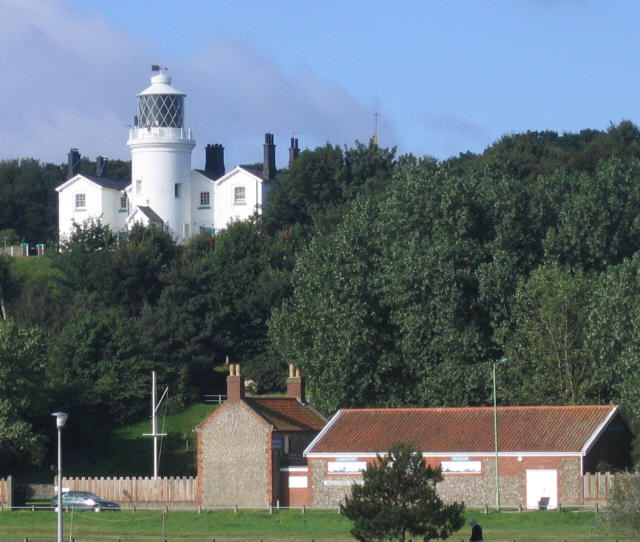
Lowestoft Lighthouse

The first two lighthouses in Lowestoft were built in 1609 on the foreshore and candlelit, to warn of the dangerous sandbanks around the coast. These were the first constructed by Trinity House. The Low Light was discontinued in 1706 after sea encroachment, but re-established in 1730 in a form that could be easily moved in response to further changes to the Stamford Channel and shoreline. It was discontinued in August 1923. The High Light tower was rebuilt as the present lighthouse in 1874 with the intention of displaying an electric light, but when opened paraffin oil was used instead; not until 1936 was it electrified. The lighthouse, with two cottages originally for lighthouse keepers, is a Grade II listed building.

Pakefield Lighthouse, the second remaining lighthouse, can be found on the coast south of Lowestoft, between Pakefield and the village of Kessingland. Originally constructed in 1831 and decommissioned in 1864, Pakefield lighthouse is now looked after by volunteers from Pakefield Coastwatch, who operate it as a coastal surveillance station.

=== Lifeboat station ===
Lowestoft Lifeboat Station, at the mouth of the outer harbour at the South Pier, is one of Britain's oldest, founded in 1801 and open to visitors throughout the year. The lifeboat is Patsy Knight, a Shannon class lifeboat which replaced the Tyne class boat Spirit of Lowestoft in 2014. A former Lowestoft lifeboat was used during the Dunkirk evacuation of British forces from France in 1940. The South Broads Lifeboat Station, an inland RNLI station, operated at Oulton Broad in 2001–2011.

=== Town Hall ===
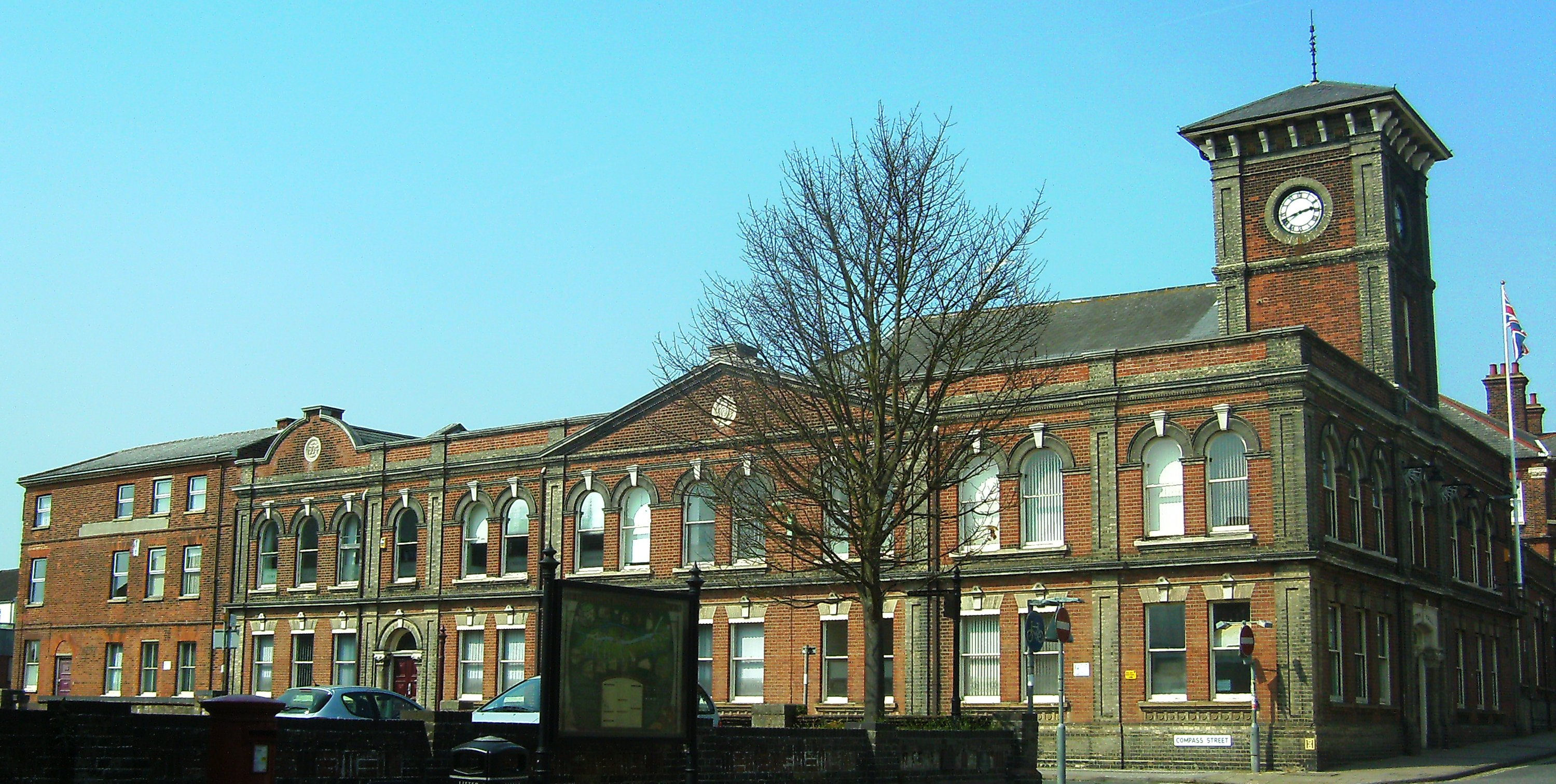
Lowestoft Town Hall

Lowestoft Town Hall stands in the High Street. Various forms of local government have met or been based on this site since its establishment as a Town House and Chapel in 1570. In 1698 a new Town House was built, incorporating a corn cross on the ground floor with the meeting chamber and chapel above. This in turn was replaced by the present building, designed by architect J. L. Clemence in 1857. The building houses the town clock and the curfew bell, which dates from 1644 and is rung each evening at 8 p. m. The building is a Grade II listed building.

In 2012, Waveney District Council announced that it planned to leave the town hall and share Suffolk County Council's offices in Riverside Road. This occurred in 2015.

=== Gull Wing Bridge ===
The Gull Wing Bridge is a rolling bascule bridge that spans Lake Lothing in the town of Lowestoft, Suffolk, England, and is the largest bridge of its kind in the world to date.

The bridge's surface consists of a two-lane single carriageway with pedestrian and cycle footpaths on both sides. The bridge maintains a speed limit of 30 mph (50 km/h) for road traffic.

The bascule span of the bridge, which opens up southwards when required, lies around 12 metres (39 ft) above water level during high tides, with the space between the two main spans in the water being around 35 metres (115 ft) – safety features fitted to the span walls limit shipping with a maximum width of 32 metres (105 ft) to be able to pass through its channel. The Northern Approach Viaduct (NAV) has ground clearance of around 6-metre (20 ft) over the railway line to Lowestoft station for trains. Road access in the south is via Waveney Drive, while in the north it is via Peto Way and Denmark Road.

== Listed buildings ==
Lowestoft has 99 listed buildings, of these one is grade I, five are grade II* and 93 are grade II.

== Transport ==
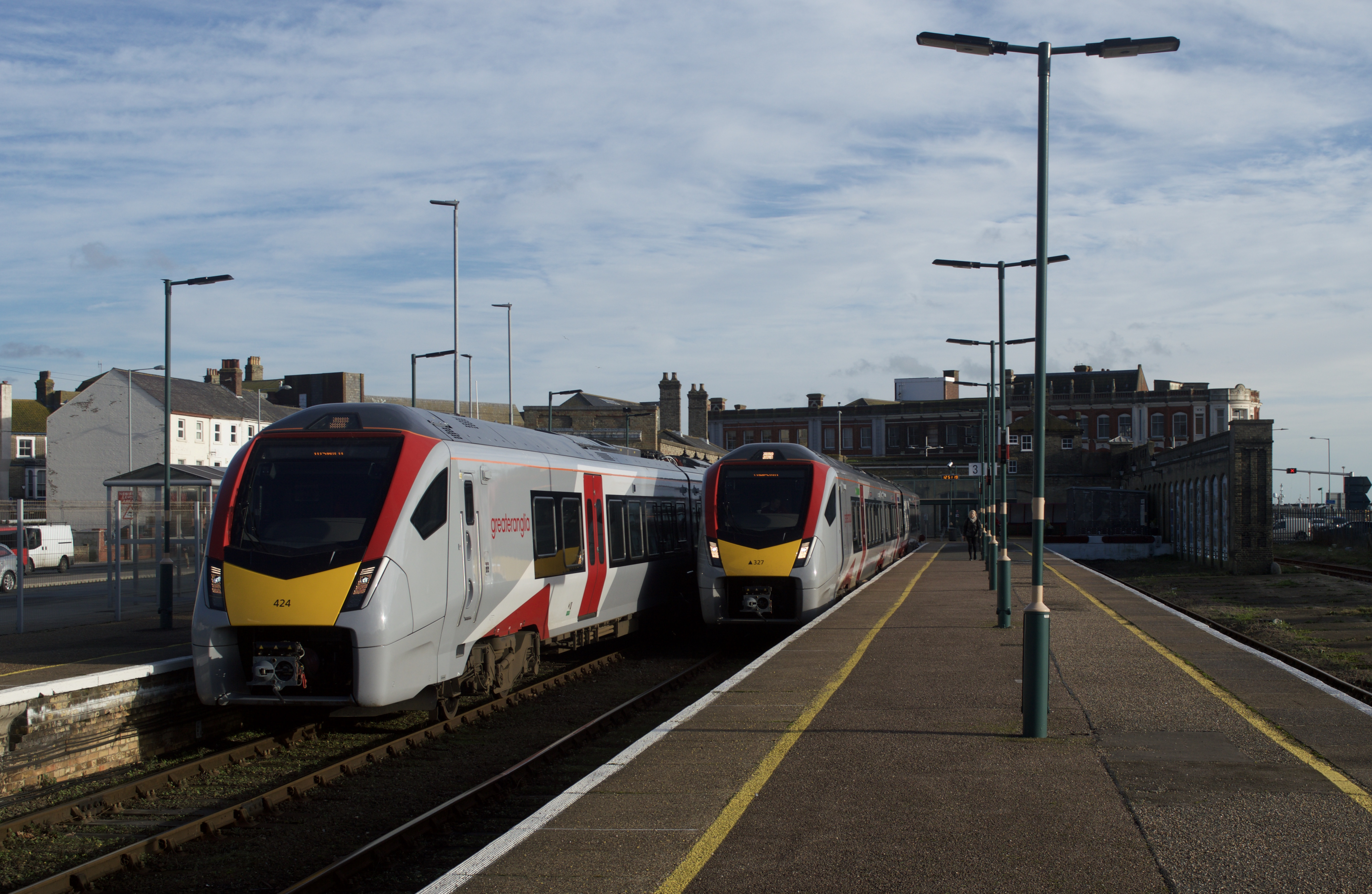
Trains at Lowestoft station

Lowestoft railway station, originally Lowestoft Central, is centrally placed within walking distance of the beach and the town centre. It provides services to Ipswich on the East Suffolk Line and to Norwich on the Wherry Line. Both lines were originally part of the Great Eastern Railway and are operated by Greater Anglia. The suburb of Oulton Broad has two stations: Oulton Broad North lies on the line to Norwich, while Oulton Broad South is on the line to Ipswich.

Lowestoft North, originally operated by the Norfolk and Suffolk Joint Railway, closed in 1970 with the Lowestoft to Great Yarmouth line. The site is now taken by the residential Beeching Drive.

Buses in Lowestoft are mainly operated by First Eastern Counties, with Lowestoft bus station as the hub. They link the town with Norwich and Great Yarmouth and provide services within the town and to surrounding villages.

The main A12 road to London passes through Carlton Colville, Pakefield and Kirkley in the southern area of Lowestoft, ending at the town's harbour Bascule Bridge. It connects there to the A47 road, which runs around the centre of town, before exiting along Great Yarmouth Road, crossing the county border into Norfolk.

A second road from the town centre, the A1044, links the town to Oulton Broad, via its second road crossing over Lake Lothing, and connects with the A146 that runs between Lowestoft, Beccles and Norwich. Both bridges can be raised if vessels need to pass through the harbour and Lake Lothing, though this can cause congestion in the town and routes can become gridlocked. As of June 2021 a third crossing of Lowestoft Harbour is under construction. A southern relief road was built to divert traffic from the seafront, while a proposed pedestrian and cycle bridge is planned as an alternative crossing alongside the Bascule Bridge.

Lowestoft's cycle network has routes that link areas to the town centre. About 12 per cent of residents cycle to work. The town is seen as "ideally suited" to cycling due to its relatively small size and flat landscape. Suffolk County Council aims to promote cycling by working with employers and schools and by funding a town-centre pedestrian and cycle bridge.

== Education ==
Lowestoft has several primary and high schools, including four 11–16 high schools: Benjamin Britten Academy, Ormiston Denes Academy, East Point Academy and Pakefield High School. After reorganisation, all eight middle schools in the town closed in 2011 and Pakefield High School opened. Post-16 education is provided at Lowestoft Sixth Form College, which opened in September 2011 as part of the reorganisation, and at East Coast College (Lowestoft Campus), which offers a range of academic and vocational courses.

East Coast College (Lowestoft Campus) provides some higher education courses through an affiliation to the University of Suffolk. Degrees were initially validated by the University of East Anglia and the University of Essex but are now validated by the University of Suffolk. The college also has courses in boat building and some to support the offshore and maritime industries that are major employers in the town. Other adult education courses are run by the County Council from a base at the town library.

== Sport and leisure ==
Lowestoft's sport clubs and facilities include Lowestoft Town Football Club at Crown Meadow and Kirkley & Pakefield Football Club at Walmer Road. Lowestoft Cricket Club plays at the Denes Oval sports ground. Other sport clubs include Waveney Gymnastics club and Rookery Park Golf Club.

Nicknamed 'The Waves', Lowestoft Ladies football team won the Women's FA Cup in 1982. They beat Cleveland Spartans 2–0 at Loftus Road with Linda Curl and Angela Poppy scoring the goals. Unfortunately due to their geographical location, they were refused entry into several leagues and the club disbanded shortly afterwards.

Lowestoft and Yarmouth rugby football club also has its Gunton Park home based in Lowestoft. Founded in 1879, it is one of the oldest rugby union clubs in England.

East Coast Hockey Club is the town's field hockey team formed in 2019 as a result of a merger between Lowestoft Railway Hockey Club and Lowestoft Ladies Hockey Club. They play their home matches at East Point Academy.

The town's main leisure centre, the Waterlane Leisure Centre, was redeveloped at a cost of £8 million in 2010–2011. Facilities include a gym and climbing wall as well as a 25-metre swimming pool with a movable floor. Lowestoft has a number of parks and recreation grounds.

The Broads national park extends to Lowestoft on Oulton Broad. Water activities and boat tours can be taken here. Powerboat racing takes place throughout the summer, mainly on Thursday evenings. Fixtures are organised by the Lowestoft and Oulton Broad Motor Boat Club and can attract up to 1500 spectators. The Royal Norfolk and Suffolk Yacht Club has its club house in Lowestoft harbour.

=== First Light festival ===
The annual First Light festival, first run in 2019, is a free midsummer celebration, on the town's seafront. The programme includes storytelling, art, science, music, dance, workshops, wellbeing sessions and family adventures.

== Notable people ==
=== Arts, literature and media ===
- Benjamin Britten was born in Lowestoft in 1913. A composer, Britten has been called "without a doubt the greatest English classical composer of the last century" and "the only person of real celebrity to have emerged from darkest Lowestoft." The Benjamin Britten High School and a small town shopping centre are named after him.
- George Borrow, the 19th-century writer and traveller, lived at Oulton Broad for many years and wrote most of his books there.
- George Davison, a photographer, was also born in Lowestoft.
- Mark Dawson, an author, was born in the town.
- Michael Foreman (born in 1938), is a children's author and illustrator who spent his childhood in Pakefield, where his mother kept a grocer's shop. He went to Pakefield Primary School, and played on Hilly Green – stories of which are recorded in his book War Boy.
- Roland Aubrey Leighton, fiancé of Vera Brittain, immortalised in her WW1 autobiography Testament of Youth, lived with his family at Heather Cliff on Gunton Cliff.
- James Mayhew, an author and illustrator, lived in the town and studied at Lowestoft School of Art.
- Thomas Nashe (born in Lowestoft in 1567) was an Elizabethan pamphleteer, regarded as a father of modern journalism and a primary source for the literary milieux of William Shakespeare.
- Zeb Soanes, a BBC Radio 4 newsreader and television presenter, was born in Lowestoft.
- Karl Theobald, a comedian and actor, was born in Lowestoft.
- Robbie Vincent, English radio broadcaster and DJ.
- Tim Westwood, a BBC radio presenter and DJ, was born in Lowestoft.

=== Business and philanthropy ===
- Howard Hollingsworth, philanthropist and co-founder of Bourne & Hollingsworth Department Store, visited Lowestoft in 1908 and later bought and renovated the burnt-out Briar Clyffe House and grounds on Gunton Cliff. He became a Lowestoft benefactor, and on the death of his friend Nicholas Everitt, bought his estate at Oulton Broad and gave it to Lowestoft for a public park. He was made the first Freeman of the Borough of Lowestoft in 1929.
- Sir Samuel Morton Peto bought Somerleyton Hall in 1843 and has one of the town's main roads named after him. He was influential in developing the town's railway links and harbour.

=== Military and naval ===
Sir Edwin Alderson, a lieutenant general, also lived at Oulton Broad, on a houseboat, and died in 1927 at the since-demolished Royal Hotel in Lowestoft, where he had been staying for his last month.

- Sir Thomas Allin, a commander at the Battle of Lowestoft on 13 June 1665 was awarded a knighthood on 24 June and appointed an Admiral of the Blue squadron. He lived in a family house in High Street until his victories enabled him to move to a grander country residence, Somerleyton Hall.
- Sir John Ashby, an admiral who commanded HMS Victory at the Battles of Barfleur and La Hogue in 1692, grew up in Suffolk and is buried in Lowestoft. A memorial is sited in St Margaret's Church.
- Claud Castleton of the Australian Army and Victoria Cross recipient was born in Kirkley.
- Thomas Crisp, a Royal Navy officer and Victoria Cross recipient, was born in the town – one of the town's main roads is named after him.
- Vice Admiral James Dacres fought in wars against America in the 19th century and was born in the town.

=== Music ===
- Three founder members of The Darkness rock band were educated in Kirkley (Justin Hawkins, his brother Dan Hawkins and Ed Graham.) Some of their songs feature local landmarks or stories such as "Black Shuck".
- British alternative rock band A formed in Lowestoft in the late 80s, with their 2026 song. Kings of Lowestoft, paying homage to their hometown. Lead singer Jason Perry once shared a flat with Dan Hawkins, who later went on to be in The Darkness.
- Lil' Chris featured in Channel 4's Rock School, filmed at Kirkley high school (now East Point Academy) and went on to a musical career. Leanne Mitchell, winner of the first The Voice UK series, lives in the town.

=== Public service and lifesaving ===
- Robert William Hook, coxswain at the RNLI in Lowestoft from 1853 to 1883 and who has been credited with saving more than 600 lives in his career, with Lowestoft RNLI and with private companies. He was born in Lowestoft, lived and worked there all his life, and is buried in Lowestoft Cemetery.

=== Science and scholarship ===
- Sir Christopher Cockerell, inventor of the hovercraft, lived at Oulton Broad, and tested craft in Somerleyton at Fritton Lake.
- Sir Dennis Holme Robertson, an economist, was born in Lowestoft in 1890. He was educated on a scholarship at Eton, and read Classics and Economics at Trinity College, Cambridge before teaching at Cambridge University, working closely with Keynes.
- Robert Potter, poet and translator of Greek drama, was Vicar of Lowestoft until 1804.
- Fiammetta Wilson (born Helen Francis Worthington in 1864) was an astronomer was born in the town.

=== Sport ===
- Terry Butcher was educated in Lowestoft before becoming captain of the England national football team.
- Paul Haylock was associated with Lowestoft before playing as a defender for Norwich City.
- Richard Money was associated with Lowestoft before becoming a professional football player and manager.
- Anthony Ogogo is associated with Lowestoft and won an Olympic bronze medal in the middleweight division.
- Les Rohr, a baseball player, was associated with Lowestoft before pitching for the New York Mets.
- Laurie Sivell was associated with Lowestoft before playing as a goalkeeper for Ipswich Town.
- Daryl Sutch was associated with Lowestoft before playing as a defender for Norwich City.
- Peter Wright spent his formative years in Lowestoft before winning the PDC World Darts Championship.

== Freedom of the Town ==
The following individuals, military units, organisations and groups have received the Freedom of the Town of Lowestoft.

=== Individuals ===
- Benjamin Britten: 28 July 1951. (Borough of Lowestoft)
- John Wylson: 25 June 2021
- Christopher Brooks: 25 June 2021, formally conferred at a ceremony on 27 November 2021.

=== Organisations and groups ===
- The Excelsior: 25 June 2021.
- The Royal British Legion (Lowestoft and District Branch): 17 November 2021.
