= Kirkley =

Area of Lowestoft, England

Coordinates: 52.465°N 1.738°E

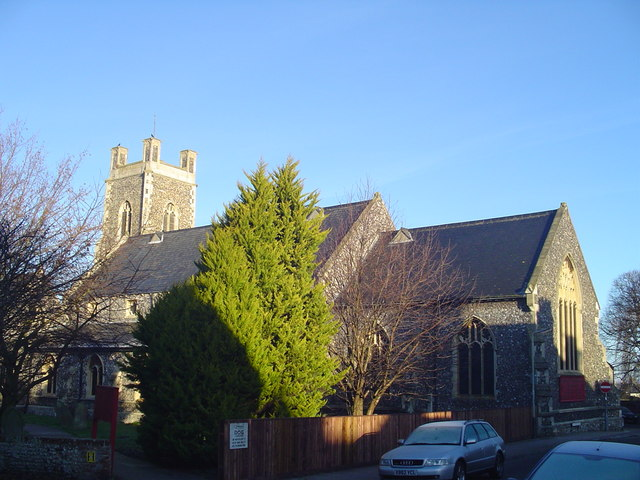
- Church of St Peter and St John

- Location within Suffolk
- Population: 7,439 (2011)
- OS grid reference: TM541916
- Civil parish: Lowestoft
- District: East Suffolk
- Shire county: Suffolk
- Region: East
- Country: England
- Sovereign state: United Kingdom
- Post town: LOWESTOFT
- Postcode district: NR33
- Dialling code: 01502
- UK Parliament: Lowestoft

Kirkley is an area of the town of Lowestoft in the East Suffolk district of the English county of Suffolk. It is located south of the centre of Lowestoft and the town's harbour and Lake Lothing. Kirkley was originally an independent village but is now part of the urban conurbation of Lowestoft. In 2011 the ward had a population of 7,439.

== History ==
Kirkley was briefly mentioned in the Domesday Book at which time it formed part of William the Conqueror's estates and was held by Roger Bigot. The area is described as a village with a population of around 433 by Suckling in 1846, with its main industry being fishing.

The former parish church is dedicated to St Peter and St John. The church had fallen into disrepair by 1640, with restoration taking place at some point in the 18th Century.

In 1847, from his base at Somerleyton Hall, entrepreneur Samuel Morton Peto brought the railway to Lowestoft. A new resort was built by Peto in the then rural parish of Kirkley and along the south beach. Peto sponsored construction of St John's church on the corner of Belvedere Road for the inhabitants of the new town. This was damaged by flooding and finally demolished in 1977.

Peto's legacy can be seen throughout Kirkley, including Wellington Terrace and Gardens (where there is a commemorative plaque to him), period seafront houses and Kensington Gardens. Kirkley is also the site of Britten House, a large Victorian house in Kirkley Cliff Road where the composer Benjamin Britten was born in 1913.

In 1901 the parish had a population of 6,465. On 1 April 1907 the parish was abolished and merged with Lowestoft.

== Redevelopment ==
In 2019 Kirkley hosted the ‘sunrise first light festival’ on the beach. Kirkley was part of the Waveney Sunrise Scheme and has received regeneration finance from the EU.

== Culture and community ==
The local high school is East Point Academy which teaches students from ages 11–16.

The Centre for Environment, Fisheries and Aquaculture Science (CEFAS), a large fisheries research centre, which is a part of Defra, is located in the Kirkley area.

Kirkley has a Non-League football club Kirkley and Pakefield Football Club who play at Walmer Road.

== Notable people ==
- Claud Castleton V.C. of the Australian Army was born in Kirkley.
- Three founder members of the rock band The Darkness were educated in Kirkley.
- Lil' Chris featured in Channel 4's Rock School programme filmed at Kirkley High School and went on to have a musical career.

== See also ==
- Kirkley Cemetery
