= Abi Titmuss =

English actress, television personality, poker player, and former glamour model

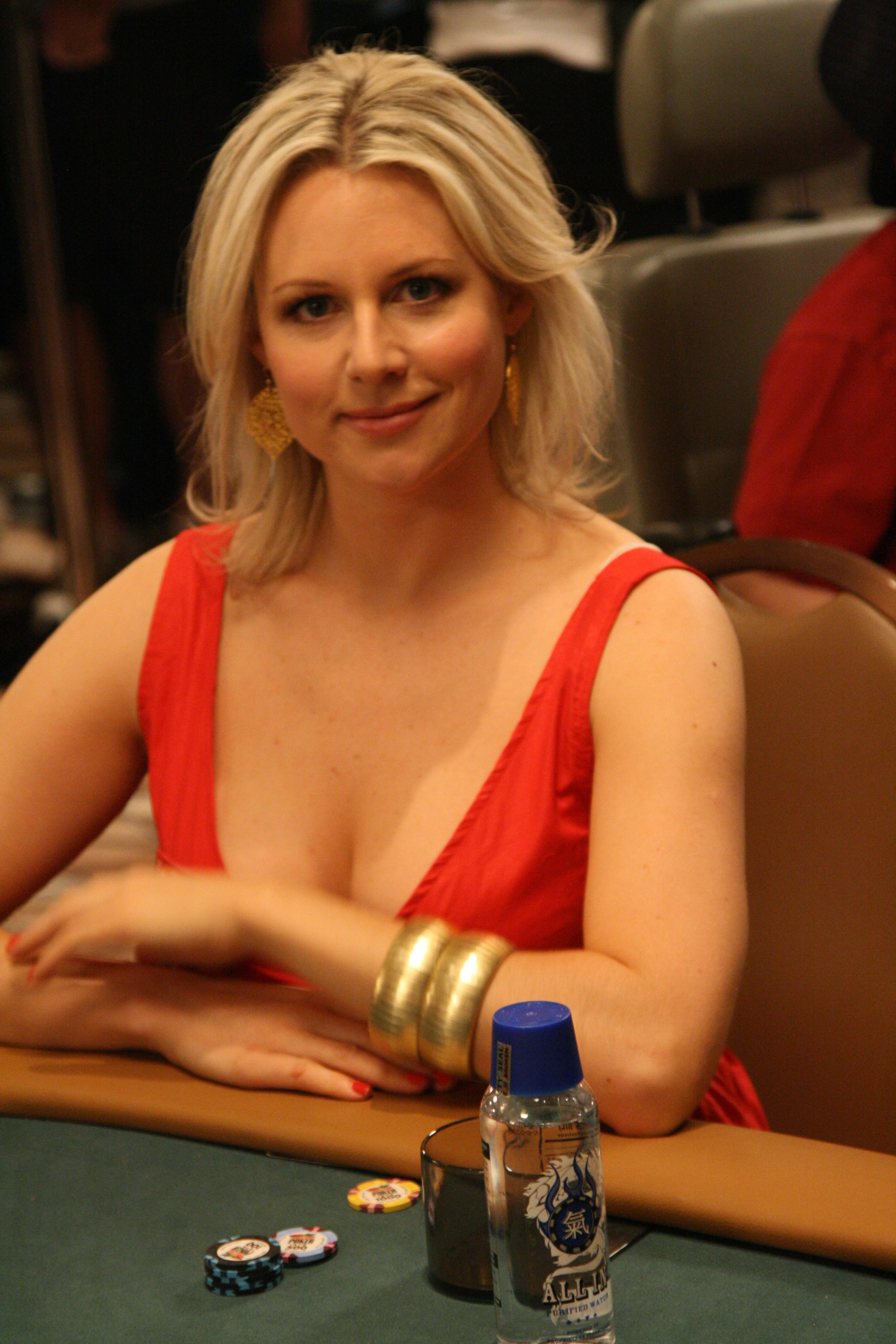
- Titmuss at the 2008 World Series of Poker
- Born: 8 February 1976 (age 50); Newark-on-Trent, Nottinghamshire, England
- Education: City St George's, University of London
- Occupations: Actress; television personality; poker player; glamour model; nurse
- Spouse: Ari Welkom (m. 2017)
- Children: 1

Abigail Evelyn Titmuss (born 8 February 1976) is an English actress, television personality, and poker player. She is also a former glamour model and nurse.

== Early life and education ==
Born in Newark-on-Trent in Nottinghamshire, Titmuss grew up in Ruskington, Lincolnshire; both of her parents were teachers.

At Kesteven and Sleaford High School, she played the clarinet, gaining GCSEs in biology, English language, English literature, French, maths, physics, religious studies and Latin. Titmuss joined the sixth form in September 1992, and by 1994, there is no record of her taking any A-levels at the Sleaford Joint Sixth Form.

When she was 17, her parents divorced and her father moved to Argyll, Scotland.

== Nursing ==
Titmuss graduated from City University at the teaching hospital St Bartholomew's Hospital in 1998. She completed a nursing diploma, because she "was interested in becoming a doctor, but hadn't taken A level chemistry" and became a staff nurse at London's University College Hospital.

== Television and radio ==
Titmuss was hired as a roving reporter on the Channel 4 programme Richard & Judy, in late 2003, and stated at the time that the job was "an absolute dream come true". She lost her job in January 2004 following allegations of group sex with her boyfriend John Leslie. A sex tape from four years earlier emerged, in which she had been privately filmed having sex with Leslie and Aisha Abubakar, an aspiring model. The footage was downloaded without permission from a private computer and made public by the conman Jason Onabowale, who was later convicted and sentenced to serve 18 years in jail for four counts of rape.

She appeared on Hell's Kitchen in 2004 and the following year appeared on Channel 4's The Friday Night Project as a regular guest; in Abi Titmuss: A Modern Day Morality Tale, a fly-on-the-wall documentary for Channel 4; and on ITV1's Celebrity Love Island.

She starred on a celebrity edition of Channel 4's Come Dine with Me with Paul Ross, Lesley Joseph, Linda Lusardi and Rodney Marsh.

Titmuss appeared on the reality television series Deadline with Janet Street-Porter on ITV2. The show followed a number of celebrities as they attempted to produce a celebrity-based magazine each week, published as a supplement to Closer. Titmuss was the fourth celebrity to be sacked from the show.

She has guest-presented shows on Virgin Radio, MTV and LBC radio.

== Glamour ==
Titmuss took up presenting on pornographic channel Television X, released a fitness video, put her name to an erotic novel published by Black Lace, and made personal appearances in nightclubs in the UK and Ireland. An initial offer of a photo shoot over two pages of FHM morphed into a three-page spread and a cover.

In December 2004, Titmuss appeared on the front cover of FHM again, with Swedish model Victoria Silvstedt, "marking," as she wrote, "the first time a girl was on the FHM cover twice in one year". In 2004 and 2005, she made a total of 38 front-page appearances on British men's magazines, such as FHM, Nuts, Zoo Weekly, Loaded, GQ and Maxim. She also appeared in the Sunday Times Style section and in glamour pictures in several tabloid newspapers, including The Sun, News of the World, Daily Mirror, The People and Daily Star.

In 2005, Titmuss was ranked seventh by readers in FHM's list of 100 Sexiest Women in the World. She started writing a regular sex advice column for the magazine the same year. In 2005, Titmuss appeared in a high fashion shoot in Pop magazine, which commented on her status as the "face of 21st century celebrity".

In her memoir, Titmuss states how she quickly realised that she wanted more control after seeing magazines pay her for one shoot and then sell the pictures many times over. Accordingly, she started paying for and directing her own shoots, thus owning the copyright over them and selling them herself, along with her manager.

After taking a break from modelling, Titmuss relaunched her glamour career in 2007, this time as a brunette, with an appearance on the cover of Zoo Weekly and the sale of the official "Abi Titmuss Calendar".

After announcing in late 2007 that she would take a break from her glamour modelling career to concentrate on acting, Titmuss returned with a Nuts shoot in April 2009 to promote one more calendar.

== Acting ==
Titmuss first acted during her university studies and then took part-time acting courses at the Central School of Speech and Drama, paid for from her nursing work. After reducing her glamour model work, Titmuss took a further short acting course at the same establishment. She also trained at Kensington and Chelsea College.

According to her memoir, the first West End theatre producer to audition her for a role was Marc Sinden:

25th February 2004: Today I had my audition for Marc Sinden. Marc was really lovely and put me at my ease. Marc directed me and got me to do it a couple of times. He told me at the end that he hadn't known what to expect from me, but that I had really surprised him. I was recalled for a second audition.
5th March 2004: Second audition – When I finished he sat me down and looked me in the eye and said "In my opinion Abi, you can do it. You can act. You've got that special something. I think you need someone to tell you that, don't you?" I was embarrassed to find I was crying. It was the sound of someone validating my shaky belief in my ability. I didn't get the job and he was right. I was far too raw. But I did walk out of there with my head held higher. Marc's kind words had encouraged me to follow my dream. He said that he would remember me. I wonder if he will?

In March 2006, Titmuss made her London theatre acting début at the Courtyard Theatre in King's Cross, playing a prostitute with a multiple personality disorder in Two Way Mirror (a combination of the one-act plays Elegy for a Lady and Some Kind of Love Story by Arthur Miller); for which she won a Fringe Report Award for Best West End Début.

In 2006, Titmuss had a small role in the film Goal! 2 and in the following year appeared in the second series premiere of Rob Brydon's Annually Retentive, which aired on BBC Three; and as a character called Gezebelle in an episode of Katy Brand's Big Ass Show, a sketch comedy series for ITV2.

Between 26 February and 23 March 2008, Titmuss appeared in the black comedy Fat Christ at the King's Head Theatre in Islington, London.

She has been cast in small roles in the British independent films Do Elephants Pray? and Mixed Up. In 2008, she played the "Mysterious Girl" in the Beat 24 Films independent feature film Frontman.

In 2009, Titmuss was cast in the 25th anniversary production of John Godber's play Up 'n' Under at the newly refurbished Hull Truck Theatre, Hull. Titmuss played Hazel, the fitness instructor, starring alongside James Crossley (formerly the Gladiator "Hunter" in the British version of Gladiators) and soap actor Lewis Linford ("Lee Naylor" in Emmerdale). She also had a part in the BBC TV series Hotel Babylon, playing a nun.

In November and December 2009, Titmuss appeared in a production of Shakespeare's Macbeth with the Seagull Rep, playing the character of Lady Macbeth. The production opened at the Seagull Theatre in Lowestoft before transferring to other East Anglian venues.

In January 2015, Titmuss announced that she had changed her name to Abigail Evelyn, in the context of her relocation to Hollywood, California and her attempts to establish a new career as an actress. She made her U.S. acting debut as a nurse, on Days of Our Lives.

== Poker ==
Titmuss started playing poker around 2001. In 2008, Titmuss played in "Ante Up For Africa", a charity side-event of the World Series of Poker, in Las Vegas. Ladbrokes Poker started sponsoring her in 2005, when she appeared in the first Ladbrokes Poker European Ladies Championship.

== Publications ==
The Secret Diaries of Abigail Titmuss
- Author: Abi Titmuss
- Language: English
- Genre: Memoir
- Publisher: Headline Review
- Publication date: 24 July 2008
- Publication place: United Kingdom
- Media type: Print (hardcover, paperback)
- Pages: 400

In 2005, Titmuss produced a book, co-written with Jayne Lockwood, called Ten Fantasies, in which she revealed her "ten most secret sexual fantasies." She stated that she did not want her mother to read it.

On 24 July 2008, her memoir, titled The Secret Diaries of Abigail Titmuss, on which she collaborated with Heat journalist Lucie Cave, was published by Headline Review. It was written in the form of a diary and is a day-to-day summary of her life for the previous six years. It includes an indepth look into the trial of Titmuss' then-boyfriend John Leslie, who had been accused of rape; her rise to fame; and how she dealt with the tabloids invading her life.

== Personal life ==
Titmuss first came to public attention as the girlfriend of TV presenter John Leslie, whom she met in a Fulham bar on 10 April 1999. From 2007 to 2009, she was in a relationship with Marc Warren. In 2017, she married Days of Our Lives co-star Ari Welkom. The couple have a son.
