= A Death in Canaan =

- Cover to the book (first edition, 1976)
- Genre: Drama
- Written by: Joan Barthel; Spencer Eastman; Thomas Thompson
- Directed by: Tony Richardson
- Starring: Stefanie Powers; Paul Clemens; Brian Dennehy
- Country of origin: United States
- Original language: English

Production
- Producers: Robert W. Christiansen; Anna Cottle
- Production locations: Humboldt County, California; Eureka, California; Ferndale, California
- Cinematography: James Crabe
- Editor: Bud S. Smith
- Running time: 125 minutes
- Production companies: Chris/Rose Productions; Warner Bros. Television

Original release
- Network: CBS
- Release: March 1, 1978

A Death in Canaan is a 1978 American made-for-television drama film directed by Tony Richardson and starring Stefanie Powers, Paul Clemens, and Brian Dennehy. Its plot concerns the true-life story of a teenager who is put on trial for the murder of his mother in a small Connecticut town. Nominated for a Primetime Emmy Award, 1978. The film is based on the nonfiction book of the same name by Joan Barthel.

The film first aired on the CBS Wednesday Night Movies on March 1, 1978, and was never officially released on any analog or digital medium for rental or sale.

Arthur Miller's one-act play Some Kind of Love Story (1984) is loosely based on the same incident. He later adapted it into a screenplay for Everybody Wins (1990) starring Debra Winger and Nick Nolte.

== Cast ==
- Stefanie Powers – Joan Barthel
- Paul Clemens – Peter Reilly
- Tom Atkins – Lt. Bragdon
- Jacqueline Brookes – Mildred Carston
- Brian Dennehy – Barney Parsons
- Conchata Ferrell – Rita Parsons
- Charles Haid – Sgt. Case
- Floyd Levine – Thomas Lanza
- Kenneth McMillan – Sgt. Tim Scully
- Gavan O'Herlihy – Father Mark
- Yuki Shimoda – Dr. Samura
- James Sutorius – Jim Barthel
- Bonnie Bartlett – Teresa Noble
- William Bronder – Judge Revere
- Pat Corley – Judge Vincet
- Art Mehr – Drugstore Owner Art
- Charles Hallahan – Cpl. Sebastian
- Mary Jackson – Sarah Biggens
- Sally Kemp – Barbara Gibbons
- Doreen Lang – Nurse Pynne
- Lane Smith – Bob Hartman
- Michael Talbott – Trooper Miles

== Location ==
Outdoor scenes were filmed in Ferndale and Eureka, California.
