= Southwold =

Coastal town in Suffolk, England

Coordinates: 52.327°N 1.680°E

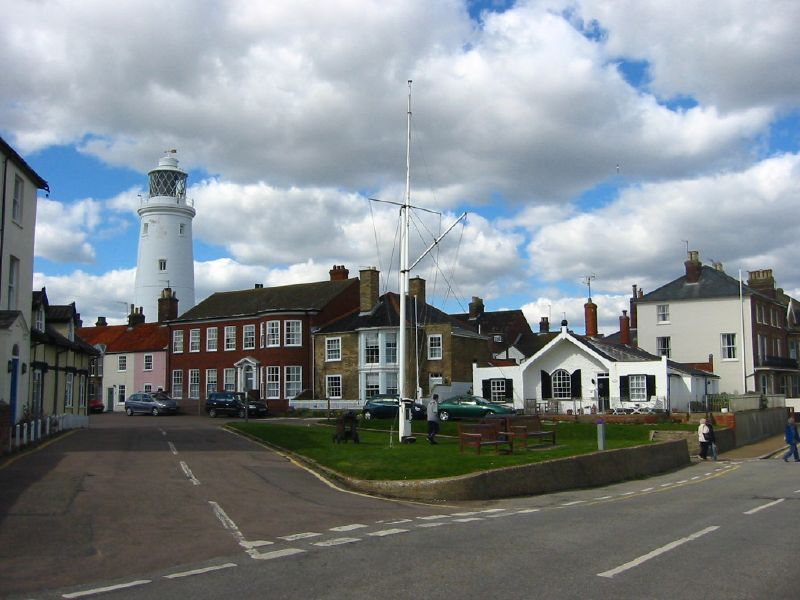
- The lighthouse from the North Parade

- Location within Suffolk
- Area: 2.68 km^{2} (1.03 sq mi)
- Population: 950 (2021 Census)
  - Density: 354/km^{2} (920/sq mi)
- OS grid reference: TM510763
- Civil parish: Southwold
- District: East Suffolk
- Shire county: Suffolk
- Region: East
- Country: England
- Sovereign state: United Kingdom
- Post town: SOUTHWOLD
- Postcode district: IP18
- Dialling code: 01502
- Police: Suffolk
- Fire: Suffolk
- Ambulance: East of England
- UK Parliament: Suffolk Coastal

Southwold is a seaside town and civil parish on the North Sea, in the East Suffolk district, in the county of Suffolk, England. It lies at the mouth of the River Blyth in the Suffolk Coast and Heaths Area of Outstanding Natural Beauty, 11 miles (18 km) south of Lowestoft, 29 miles (47 km) north-east of Ipswich and 97 miles (156 km) north-east of London, within the parliamentary constituency of Suffolk Coastal. At the 2021 Census, the population was 950.

== History ==
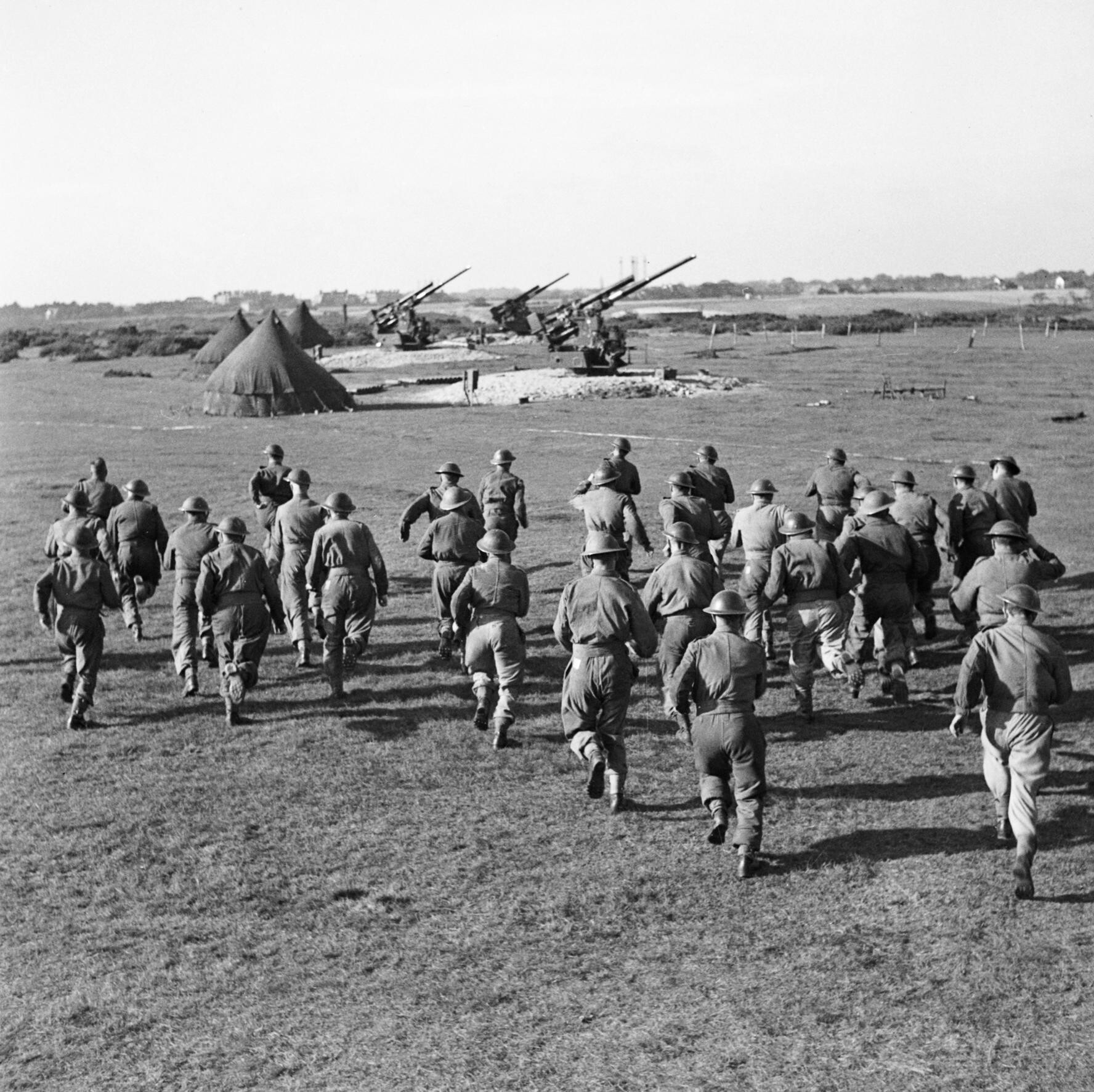
Crews rush to their 3.7-inch guns, 127th Heavy Anti-Aircraft Regiment, 9 October 1944

The name Southwold derives from the Old English sūðwald meaning 'south forest'.

Southwold was mentioned in the Domesday Book of 1086 as a fishing port, and after the "capricious River Blyth withdrew from Dunwich in 1328, bringing trade to Southwold in the 15th century", it received its town charter from Henry VII in 1489. The grant of the charter is marked by the annual Trinity Fair, when it is read out by the Town Clerk. Over following centuries, however, a shingle bar built up across the harbour mouth, preventing the town from becoming a major early modern port: "The shingle at Southwold Harbour, the mouth of the Blyth, is ever shifting," William Whittaker observed in 1887.

Southwold was the home of a number of Puritan emigrants to the Massachusetts Bay Colony in the 1630s, notably a party of 18 assembled under Rev. Young, which travelled in the Mary Ann in 1637. Richard Ibrook, born in Southwold and a former bailiff of the town, emigrated to Hingham, Massachusetts, along with Rev. Peter Hobart, son of Edmund Hobart of Hingham, Norfolk. Rev. Hobart had been an assistant vicar of St Edmund's Church, Southwold, after graduating from Magdalene College, Cambridge. Hobart married in America Rebecca Ibrook, daughter of his fellow Puritan Richard Ibrook. The migrants to Hingham were led by Robert Peck, vicar of St Andrew's Church in Hingham and a native of Beccles.

A fire in 1659 devastated most of the town, creating spaces that were never built on again. Today this "series of varied and very delightful village greens" and the restriction of expansion by the surrounding marshes, have preserved the town's tidy appearance.

On the green just above the beach, descriptively named Gun Hill, six 18-pounder cannon commemorate the Battle of Sole Bay, fought in 1672 between English and French fleets on one side and the Dutch (under Michiel de Ruyter) on the other. The battle was bloody but indecisive and many bodies were washed ashore. Southwold Museum has a collection of mementos of the event. These cannon were captured from the Scots at Culloden and given to the town by the Duke of Cumberland, who had landed at Southwold in October 1745 having been recalled from Europe to deal with the Jacobite threat. In World War II they were prudently removed, reputedly buried for safety, and returned to their former position after hostilities.

On 15 May 1943, low-flying German fighter-bombers attacked the town and killed eleven people, including the cricketer George Katinakis.

== Governance ==
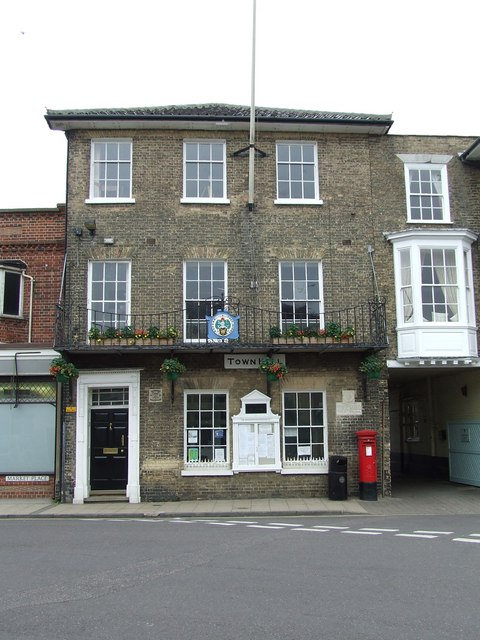
Southwold Town Hall

Up to 1 April 2019, Southwold was part of the Southwold and Reydon electoral ward in the Waveney District Council area. The ward population at the 2011 census was 3,680; the resident population of the neighbouring village of Reydon was more than double that of the town of Southwold. Although the town lost its independent Municipal Borough status in the Local Government reforms of 1974 and consequent incorporation in Waveney District, it continues to have an elected, non-partisan Town Council and Mayor, based at Southwold Town Hall.

With the 1 April 2019 amalgamation of the Waveney and Suffolk Coastal districts into a new East Suffolk district, Southwold became an expanded ward with Reydon and Walberswick, represented by a single councillor. Previously, the Southwold and Reydon ward, under Waveney District, elected two councillors. At the 2021 Census, the ward population overall had increased, by the inclusion of Walberswick (346 souls), to 3,843; of which Southwold was 950 and Reydon 2547.

== Economy ==
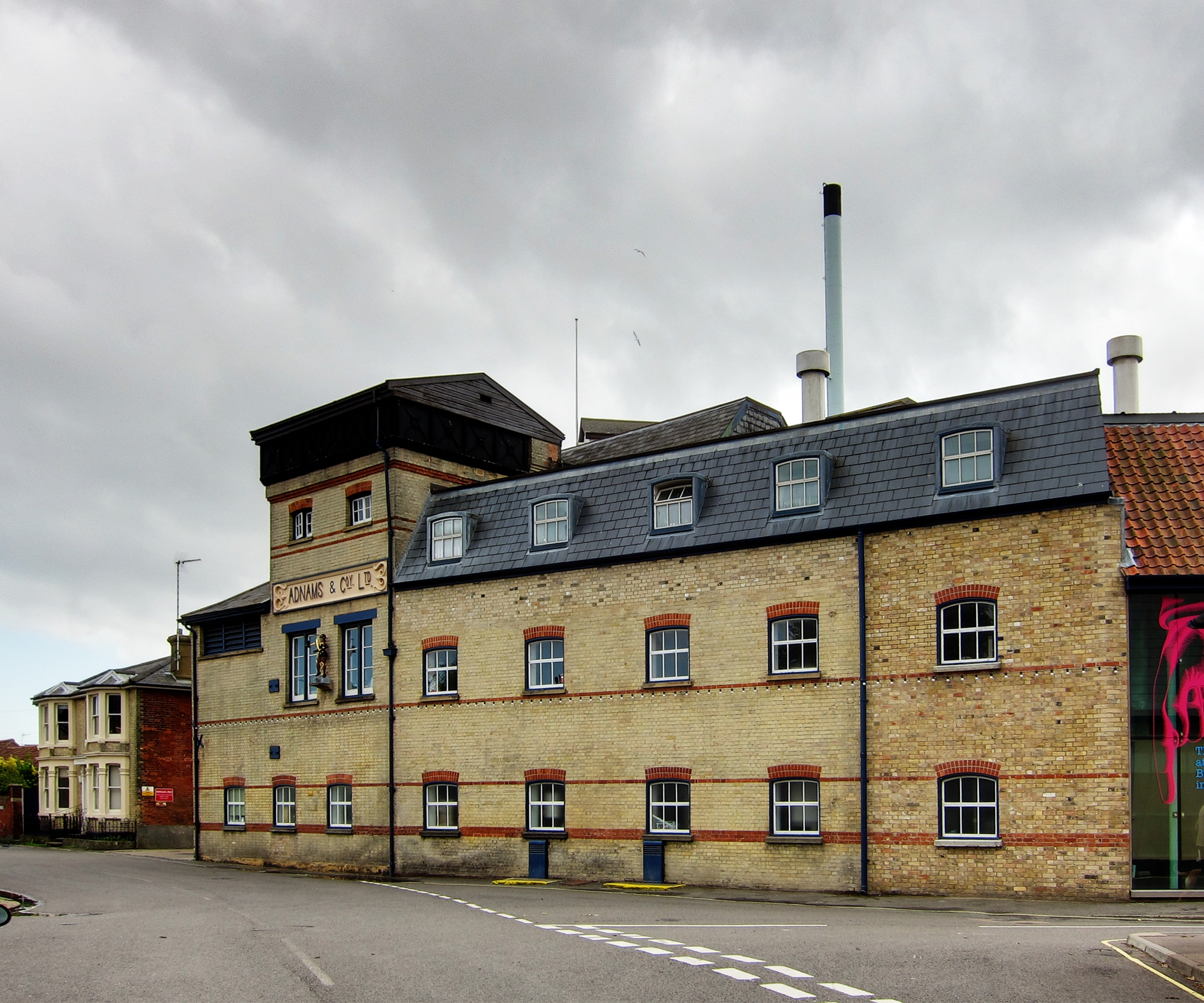
Adnams Brewery

Once home to several industries, Southwold's economy is now centred on services: hotels, holiday lets, catering and tourism. With surrounding areas largely given to agriculture, the town is an important commercial centre, with independent shops, cafés and restaurants and a market on Mondays and Thursdays, although there has been a recent trend for retail chains in food, beverages and clothing to take over the formerly independent units. There has also been an increase in the number of charity shops in the town.

Adnams Brewery remains in Southwold as its largest single employer. The fishing fleet is much diminished, but Southwold Harbour remains one of the main fishing ports on the Suffolk coastline. In 2012, additional fleet facilities were constructed there as part of the repair and reinstatement of the Harbour's North Wall.

== Education ==
=== Primary ===
Southwold Primary School, adjacent to St. Edmund's Church, currently caters for children aged 2 to 11 years. As a member of the Yoxford Valley Partnership of Schools, it works in partnership with Yoxford and Peasenhall Primary School in Yoxford and Middleton Primary School, near Dunwich.

=== Secondary ===
The nearest secondary school for Southwold children was Reydon High School until it closed in 1990. Thereafter, most pupils were bussed to the Sir John Leman High School in Beccles or to Bungay High School. These schools have been joined by SET Beccles School, opened in 2012 and catering for pupils aged 11–16.

In line with a 2019 decision by Suffolk County Council on changes to free school transport, the default 11–16 secondary school for Southwold and Reydon students is Pakefield High School at Lowestoft.

Private education for pupils aged 2–18 is offered at Saint Felix School, a private school in nearby Reydon.

== Landmarks and features ==
=== Railway ===
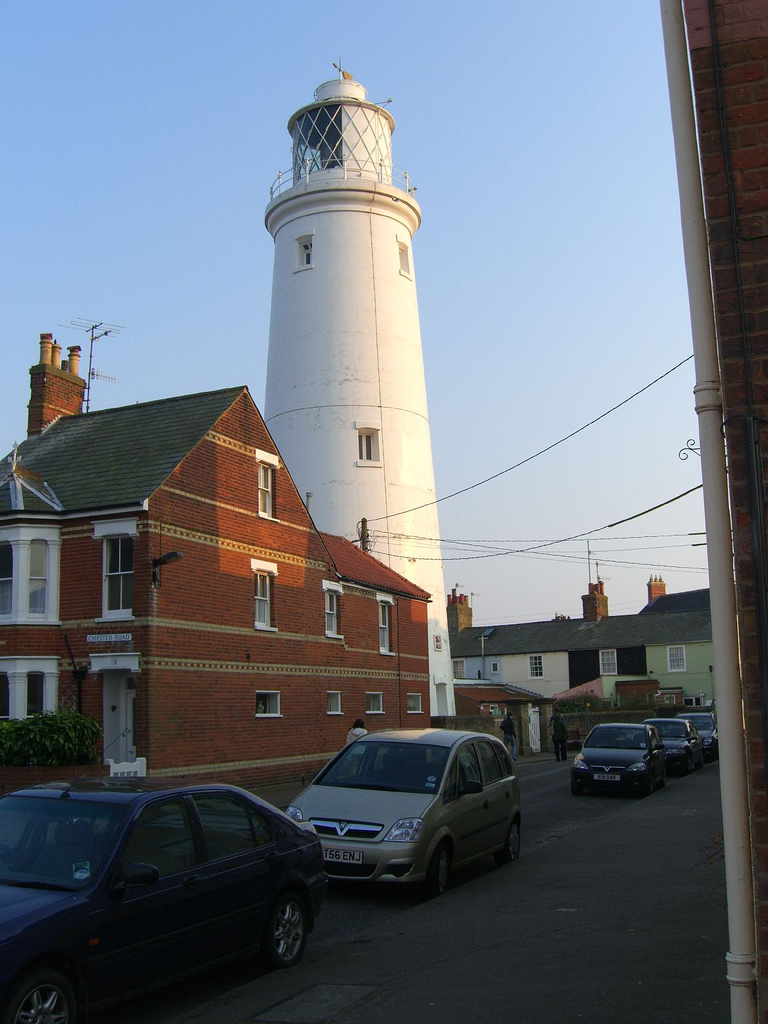
The lighthouse

The narrow-gauge Southwold Railway connecting the town to Halesworth ran from 24 September 1879 to 11 April 1929.

In 2007 the Southwold Railway Society submitted plans to build a new line between the parish of Easton Bavents and Henham Park, to link the town to the nearest mainline service at Halesworth. However, these plans were criticised for having no relation to the original route of the railway and for environmental and other reasons. In July 2007 the plans were rejected by Waveney and by Suffolk Coastal District Councils. In December 2008 the Society introduced a new proposal for a Railway Park, including railway track and a museum, on a site at present occupied by a car-breaker's yard, next to the local sewage works. That proposal was superseded by another, in which a short section of railway, together with other attractions and facilities, would be constructed in the village of Wenhaston, a few miles inland from Southwold and once a stop on the Southwold Railway. The plan did not meet with universal approval. In February 2016, the original Railway Park proposal for Blyth Road, Southwold, on the site of the town's former gasholders, was revived, and a new planning application was submitted and approved. Construction of the Railway Park began in 2017.

=== Lighthouse ===
Southwold lighthouse was commissioned in 1890 and automated and electrified in 1938. It stands as a prominent landmark in the centre of the town and is a Grade II listed building. It is 31 metres (102 ft) metres tall, standing 37 metres (121 ft) metres above sea level. It is built of brick and painted white and has 113 steps around a spiral staircase.

The lighthouse replaced three local lighthouses that were under serious threat from coastal erosion. It suffered a fire in its original oil fired lamp just six days after commissioning but survived and today operates a rotating 150-watt lamp with a range of 24 nautical miles (44 km; 28 mi). From 2023, Trinity House has arranged that tours of the lighthouse are offered by the Adnams brewery, which stands close by, and may be booked with that company.

=== Brewery ===
Adnams brewery was established in the town by George and Ernest Adnams in 1872 with the purchase of the Sole Bay Brewery, which had been founded in 1818. In 1890 the brewery was re-built on its current site in the centre of the town. The brewery is the town's largest employer and has been modernised and expanded in recent years, with development of an energy efficient brewery, a distribution centre in the nearby village of Reydon, and a distillery. In 2011 it received the Good Pub Guide Brewery of the Year Award.

=== Pier ===
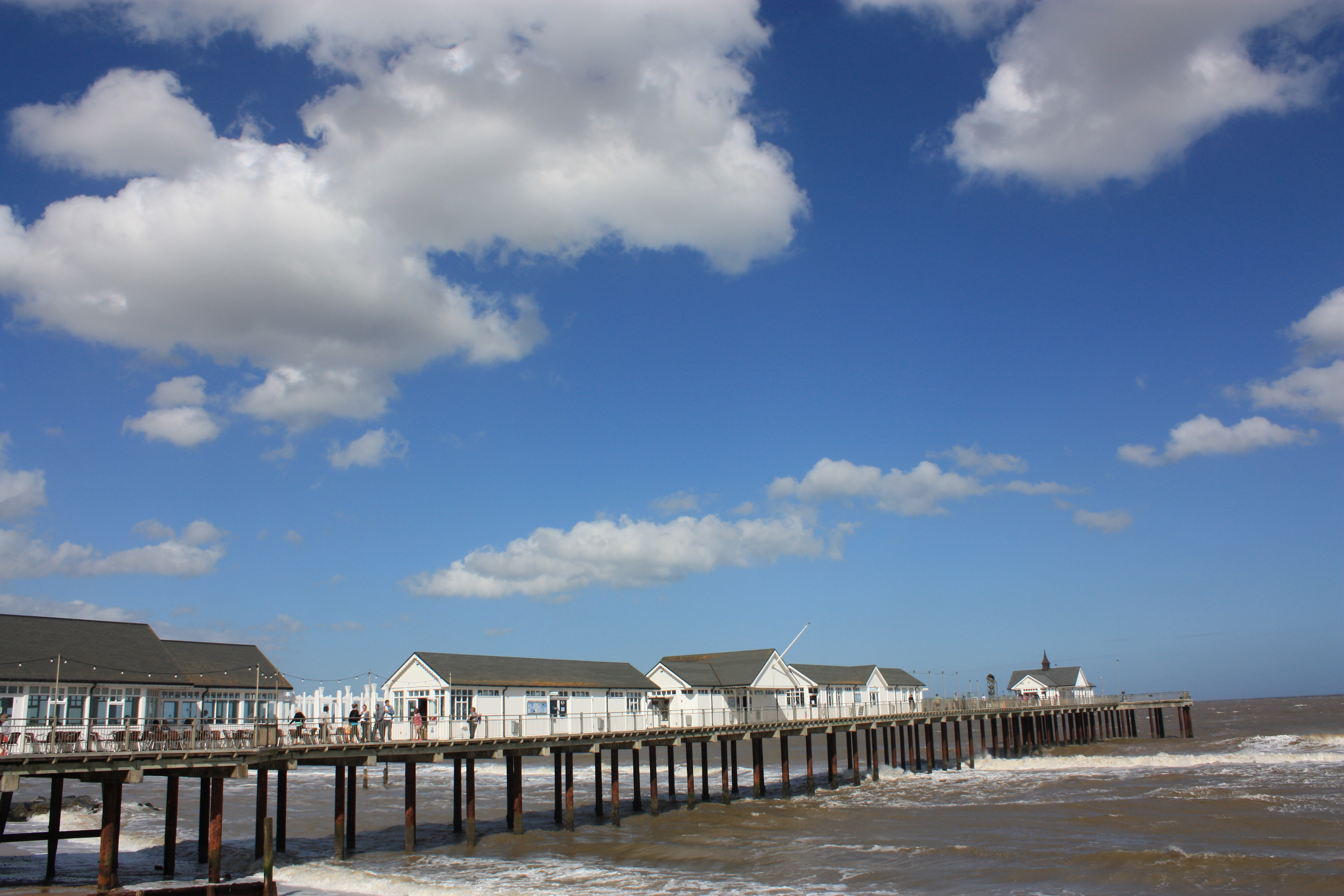
Southwold Pier in the summer sunshine

Southwold Pier was built in 1900. At 247 metres (810 ft) it was long enough to accommodate the Belle steamers that carried trippers along the coast at that time. In World War II, it was weakened by two breaches, and in 1955 a large section was destroyed by a gale. The pier was entirely rebuilt and restored in 2001 and is now about 190 metres (620 ft) long. While many English seaside piers are in decline, Southwold Pier is enjoying renewed popularity, helped by a collection of modern coin-operated novelty machines made by Tim Hunkin and the occasional berth of paddle steamers such as PS Waverley and the MV Balmoral.

A model boat pond adjacent to the pier is used for the Southwold Model Yacht regattas that have been held since the late Victorian period. Some of the boats entered are up to 80 years old and include replicas of beach yawls. Regattas are usually held in the spring and summer with the largest, the annual regatta, held at the end of the summer season.

=== Water towers ===
The Old Water Tower, in the middle of Southwold Common, was built in 1890. The tank held 40,000 gallons of water and was powered by huge sails. On St Valentine's Day 1899, George Neller, a respected local man, died when his coat got caught in its machinery. In 1937 a new 150,000 gallon capacity Art Deco water tower was built next door. The then Southwold Borough Council bought the Old Water Tower before it came into the hands of successive water companies. It was returned to the Town Council for a nominal fee of £100 in 1987. The Old Water Tower has since been used as the Lifeboat Museum and was later used by Adnams for a number of years.

=== Electric Picture Palace ===
The Electric Picture Palace cinema was opened in 2002, as a pastiche of the original 1912 cinema that stood nearby in York Road.

=== Museum ===
Southwold Museum holds a number of exhibits focused on the local and natural history of the town. The museum is owned and managed by the Southwold Museum & Historical Society. It is part of the Maritime Heritage East programme which unites more than 30 maritime museums on the East Coast.

=== Sailors' Reading Room ===
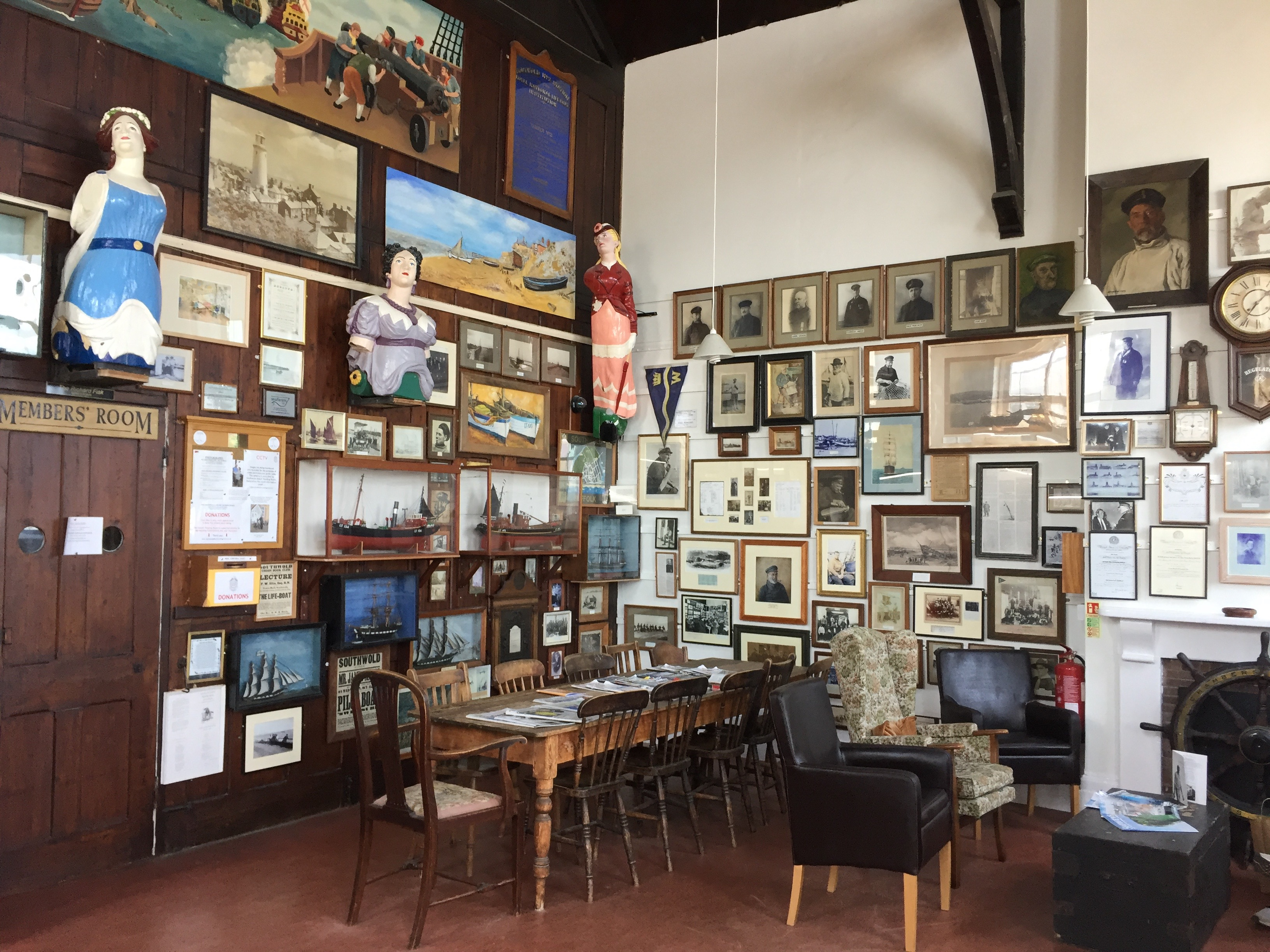
Southwold Sailors' Reading Room interior

The Southwold Sailors' Reading Room is a Grade II listed building on the seafront at Southwold. It was built in 1864 as a place for fishermen and mariners to read, as an alternative to drinking in pubs, and also to encourage the pursuit of Christian ideals. The room has a number of historic displays of model boats and other maritime objects in glass cabinets.

=== Golf club ===
Southwold Golf Club was founded on 4 January 1884 as a Golf and Quoit Club. At the time there were only three other golf clubs in East Anglia – Cambridge University, Yarmouth and Felixstowe. The first game on the nine-hole course was played on 28 August 1884. Originally membership was not accepted from shopkeepers or manual workers, but in 1925 Mr J. B. Denny successfully persuaded the committee to form an Artisans' Section, which was originally restricted to 30 members.

== St Edmund's Church ==
The Grade I listed parish church of Southwold is dedicated to St Edmund and considered one of Suffolk's finest. It lies under one continuous roof, and was built over about 60 years from the 1430s to the 1490s; replacing a smaller, 13th-century church that was destroyed by fire. The earlier church dated from the time when Southwold was a small fishing hamlet adjacent to the larger Reydon. By the 15th century Southwold was an important town in its own right, and the church was rebuilt to reflect that power and wealth.

== Harbour ==
Southwold Harbour lies south of the town on the River Blyth. Vehicle access is via York Road and Carnsey Road to the west and Ferry Road to the east. The harbour extends nearly a mile upstream from the river mouth and is mainly used by fishing boats, yachts and small pleasure boats. The clubhouse of Southwold Sailing Club is on the north side of the harbour adjacent to The Harbour Inn. The quay and area in front of the inn and clubhouse is called Blackshore; although the name has often been used incorrectly for the whole harbour in recent years.

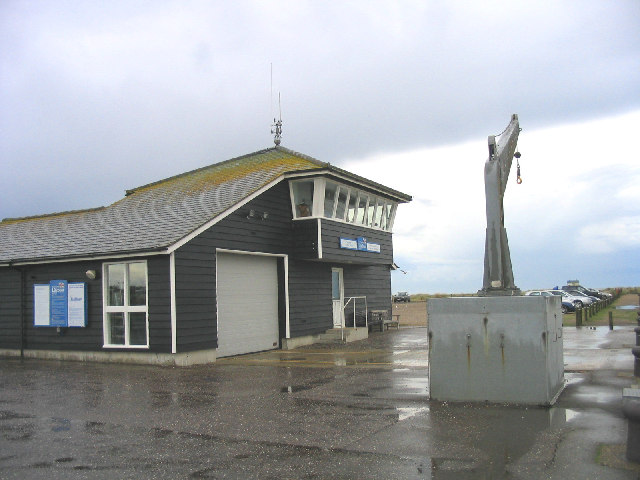
Southwold Lifeboat Station

At the seaward end of the harbour is Southwold Lifeboat Station, operated by the RNLI. The former Cromer lifeboat shed houses the Alfred Corry Museum, which features the Southwold lifeboat "Alfred Corry", which was in service from 1893 to 1918. An extensive and now-complete restoration to her original state has been carried out by volunteers over several years.

The river can be crossed on foot or bicycle by a public footbridge upstream from The Harbour Inn, which leads to the village of Walberswick. This bridge is known as the Bailey Bridge and rests on the piers and footings of the original iron Southwold Railway swing bridge. It had a central swinging section to allow the passage of wherries and other shipping on the Blyth Navigation, but this was largely removed at the start of World War II under the precautions against German invasion.

Towards the mouth of the Blyth, a rowed ferry service runs between the Walberswick and Southwold banks. It has been operated by the same family since the 1920s, when it was a chain ferry that could take cars. The chain ferry ceased working in 1941, but some vestiges remain at the Walberswick slipway.

== Beach ==
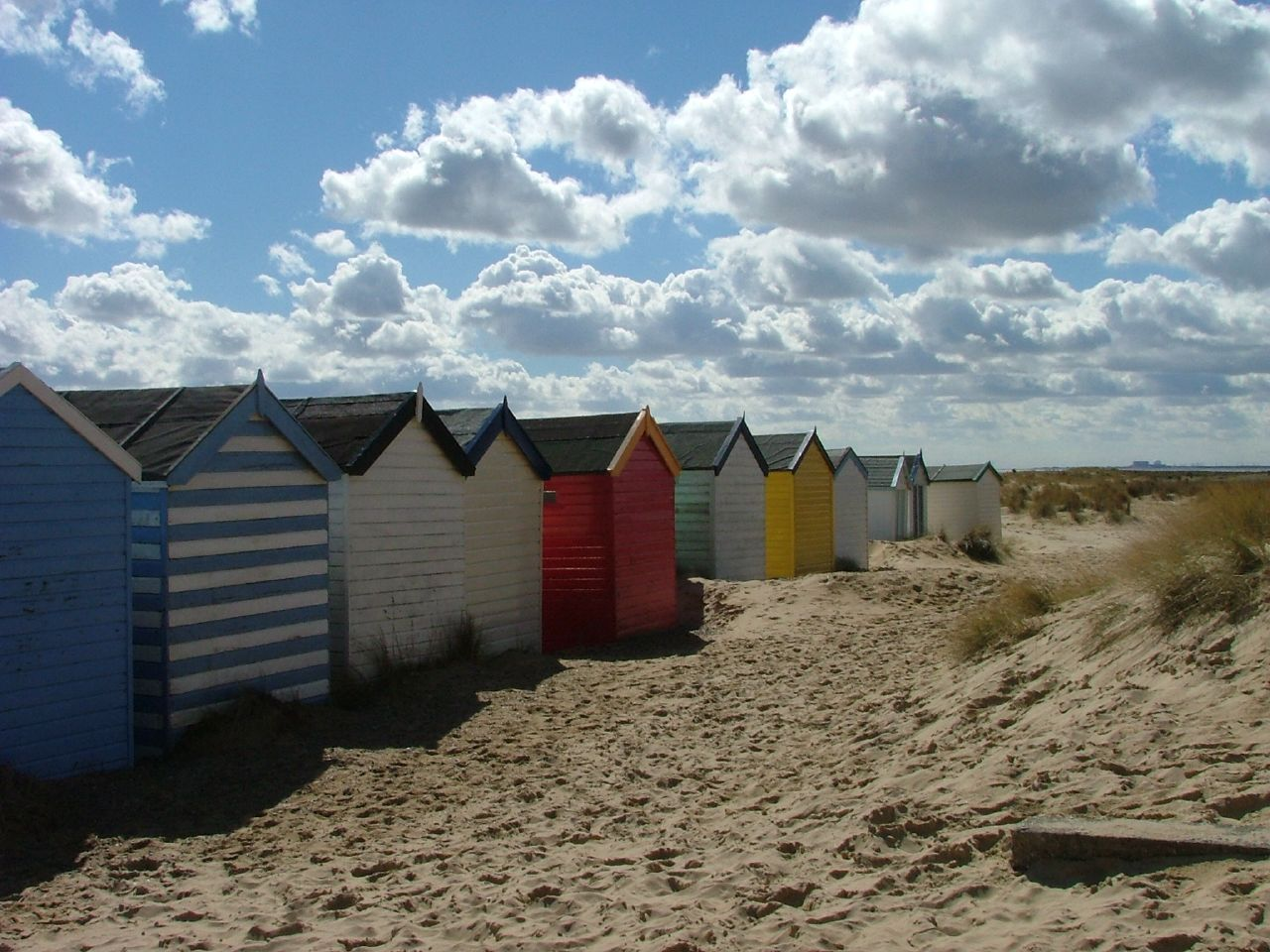
Southwold Beach huts

The beach is a combination of sand and shingle. In 2005/06 it was further protected by a coastal management scheme which includes beach nourishment, new groynes on the south side of the pier and riprap to the north.

It is overlooked by brightly painted beach huts.

== Culture ==
=== Film and television ===
The fictional Southwold Estate, seat of the equally fictional Earls of Southwold, is the country estate of the family of Lady Marjorie Bellamy in the ITV British drama Upstairs, Downstairs.

The town and its vicinity has been used as the setting for numerous films and television programmes, including Iris about the life of Iris Murdoch starring Judi Dench, Drowning by Numbers by Peter Greenaway, Kavanagh QC starring John Thaw, East of Ipswich by Michael Palin, Little Britain with Matt Lucas and David Walliams, and a 1969 version of David Copperfield.

The BBC children's series Grandpa in My Pocket was filmed in Southwold, Walberswick and Aldeburgh. Only exteriors of buildings were filmed, e.g. the Lighthouse – no acting was done there. An ITV1 drama, A Mother's Son, first broadcast in September 2012, was filmed on location in Southwold.

=== Novels ===
Julie Myerson set her 2003 murder novel Something Might Happen in an unnamed Southwold – "a sleepy, slightly self-satisfied seaside town". She said that setting a murder in the car park made her feel as if she were "soiling something really good". She holidayed in the town as a child and remarked in an interview that everything else in her life had changed, but her mother and Southwold had stayed the same. She still owns a second home there.

Other books set in Southwold include Esther Freud's novel Sea House (2004), with Southwold as Steerborough. Southwold native Neil Bell in Bredon and Sons (1933) about boatbuilding people). Forgive us our Trespasses (1947), based on a true story of twin boys lost at sea, renames the town Senwich. The Bookshop by Penelope Fitzgerald (1978) drew on her experiences working in a Southwold bookshop in the 1950s.

An earlier book thought to be set in Southwold is Beside the Guns (1902) by the Christian author Mary Elizabeth Shipley. The German writer W. G. Sebald describes Southwold in The Rings of Saturn, an account of a walk through East Anglia. Two recent additions are A Southwold Mystery (2015) and Shot in Southwold (2017) by the Herefordshire author Suzette A. Hill, both murder mysteries set in the 1950s.

=== George Orwell ===
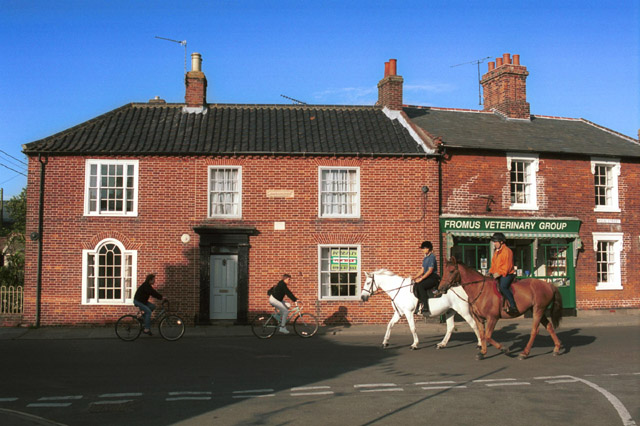
Orwell's home in Southwold

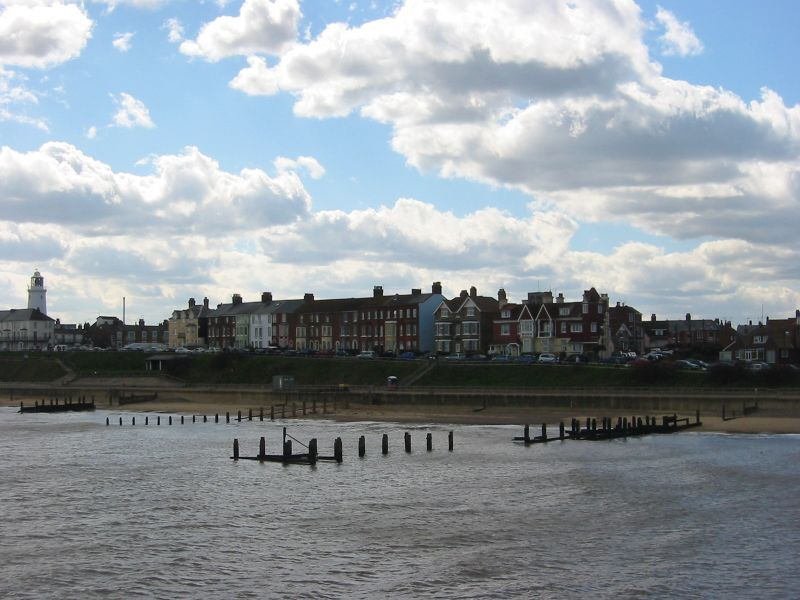
Southwold from the end of the pier

The writer George Orwell (real name Eric Blair) spent periods as a teenager and in his thirties in Southwold, living at his parents' home. A plaque can be seen next door to what is now a fish and chip shop at the far end of the High Street.

After his departure from Eton College in December 1921, Orwell travelled to join his retired father, mother and younger sister Avril, who that month had moved to 40 Stradbroke Road, Southwold, the first of four homes in the town. In January–June 1922 he attended an educational crammer in Southwold to prepare for Indian Police Service exams and his career in Burma. In 1929, after 18 months in Paris, he returned to the family in Southwold and was based there for most of the next five years. He tutored a disabled child and a family of three boys and wrote reviews and developed Burmese Days. He also spent nearly 18 months teaching in West London, until struck by a bout of pneumonia. His mother then insisted he stay at home instead of teaching. He spent the time writing A Clergyman's Daughter, which is partly set in a fictionalised East Anglian town called "Knype Hill". His final visit to Southwold was in 1939.

=== Cultural events ===
The town has long hosted summer repertory theatre by various companies. For several years, Suffolk Summer Theatres have offered a varied programme of plays from July to September, staged in Southwold Arts Centre (formerly St Edmund's Hall). Every November the "Ways with Words" literature festival is held, with notable speakers appearing at various venues.

In 2014 came the inaugural Southwold Arts Festival, which was repeated in future years. It offers a mix of literature, music, film and art exhibitions, with the main events over an eight-day period in the summer, bringing entertainers of diverse backgrounds together.

In 2005, Southwold launched Suffolk's "answer to the Turner prize", the "Flying Egg" competition. This event also ran in 2006 and 2007, but not repeated in 2008.

== Media ==
Local news and television programmes are provided by BBC East and ITV Anglia. Television signals are received from the Tacolneston TV transmitter and via a local relay transmitter in Aldeburgh.

Local radio stations are BBC Radio Suffolk, Heart East, Greatest Hits Radio Ipswich & Suffolk and East Point Radio, a community-based station.

The town's local newspaper is the East Anglian Daily Times.

== Notable people ==
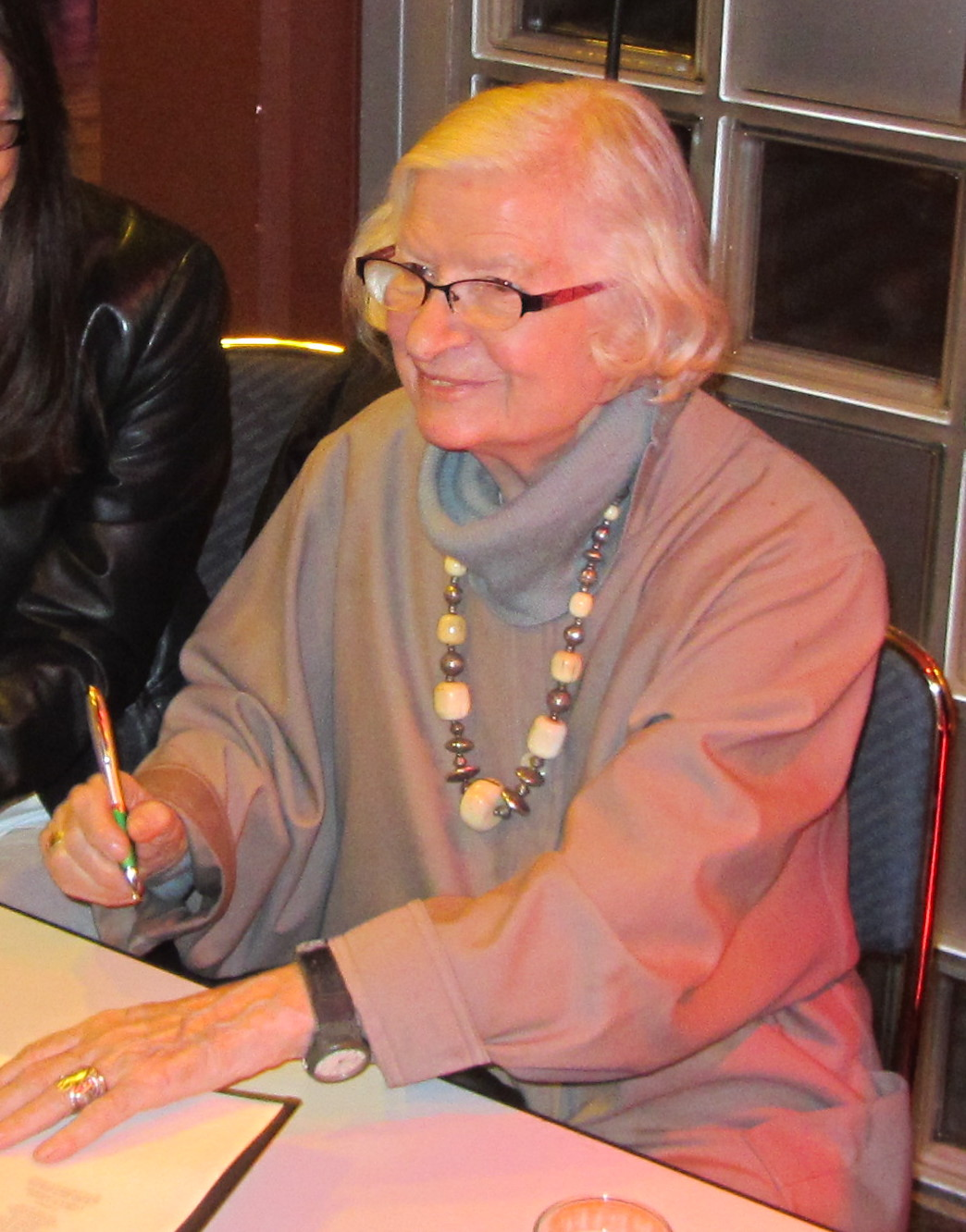
PD James 2013

In alphabetical order:

- William Alwyn (1905–1985), composer
- Finley Barbrook (born 2004), footballer
- James Barker (1622–1702) deputy governor of the Colony of Rhode Island and Providence Plantations.
- Jessie Forbes Cameron (1883–1968), mathematician
- Doreen Carwithen (1922–2003), composer
- Colin Cook (born 1954), speedway rider
- Mark Crowe (born 1965), footballer
- Alexander Hyatt King (1911–1995), musicologist and bibliographer
- Michael Imison (born 1935), television director and literary agent
- P. D. James (1920–2014), crime writer
- Mother Maribel of Wantage (1887–1970), Anglican nun and artist
- Margaret Mellis (1914–2009), artist
- John Miller (1932–2020), journalist and author who served as Mayor of Southwold in 2002.
- Geoffrey Munn (born 1953), television presenter
- George Orwell (1903–1950), writer
- Martin Shaw (1875–1958), theatre producer, composer and conductor
- Stephen Southwold (1887–1964), schoolmaster and writer
- Agnes Strickland (1796–1874), writer and poet
- Felix Swinstead (1880–1959), pianist and composer
- Henry Woollett (1895–1969), World War I flying ace
- John Youngs (c. 1598–1672), Puritan minister, founded Southold, New York.

== See also ==
- Latitude festival
- Southold (CDP), New York – village on Long Island, NY
- Southold, New York – named after Southwold, UK
- Southwold, Ontario – Canadian link

== External sources ==
- Geoffrey Munn, Southwold: An Earthly Paradise, Antique Collectors Club, (Woodbridge, 2006) ISBN 1851495185
