= Lowestoft Corporation Tramways =

British tramway operator

Coordinates: 52.4771°N 1.7374°E

Overview
- Headquarters: Lowestoft
- Locale: England
- Dates of operation: 1903–1931
- Successor: Abandoned

Technical
- Track gauge: 3 ft 6 in (1,067 mm)
- Length: 4.08 miles (6.57 km)
Route map

Lowestoft Corporation Tramways was the operator of the electric tramway system that served Lowestoft from 22 July 1903 until 8 May 1931.

== History ==
A notice was published in The London Gazette on 23 November 1900 stating the intention of Lowestoft Corporation to construct a tram line going from Lowestoft to the old parish of Pakefield, stopping off at places on the way all in the county of East Suffolk.

The system was built to a gauge of 3 ft 6 in (1,067 mm) and had a maximum extent of 4.08 miles (6.57 km). The buttons and cap badges of Lowestoft Corporation Tramways depicted an angel with a halo and wings holding a shield, containing a crown above a rose, based on the borough coat of arms, illustrated in this postcard.

In the late 1920s the corporation decided to replace the trams with motor buses rather than renew the infrastructure. The line was closed in stages, with the section north of the harbour closing in April 1931 and the southern section on 8 May 1931.

For several years prior to the closure of the tram system in 1931, the corporation operated motor buses concurrently with the trams. The first few buses were lettered "Lowestoft Corporation Tramways", but as the fleet grew the lettering was changed to "Lowestoft Corporation Transport".

== Extent of the system ==
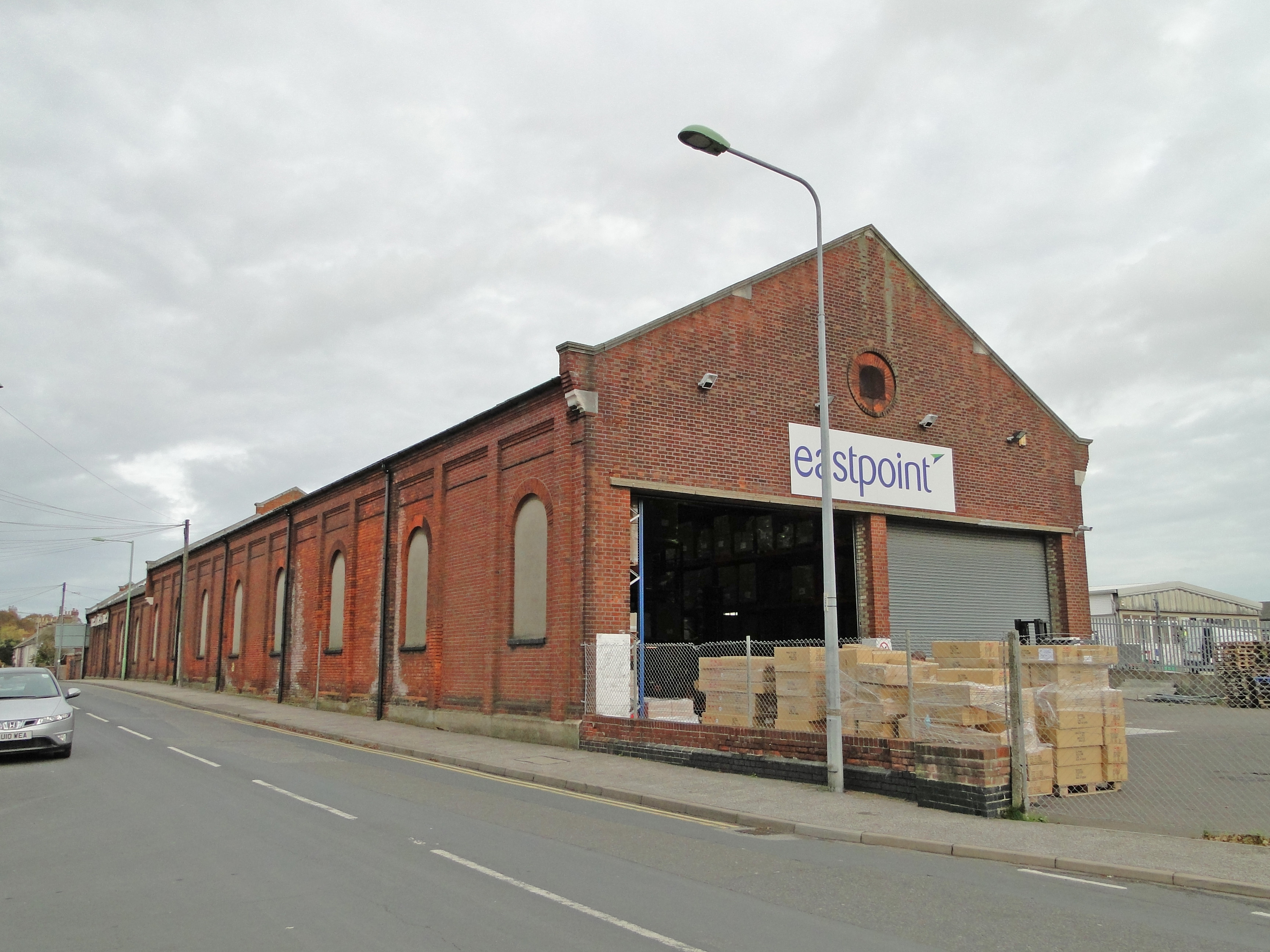
Former tram shed built in 1899, pictured in 2010 as a paint distribution centre

The northern terminus was on the A12 midway between the junction with Hollingsworth Road and the junction with Harris Avenue. From there it followed the A12 south to its other terminus at Pakefield where the A12 has a junction with Pakefield Street and Stradbroke Road. That area is still often referred to as the Pakefield terminus or Pakefield Tramways. The terminus itself was in front of what is still known today as The Tramway's Hotel.

A branch from this north–south route ran westward from the Suffolk Hotel on station square along Denmark Road to the depot in Rotterdam Road, with the entrance opposite the end of Essex Road. The shed was four lanes with a glass peak to the roof. The lines were still in situ in the depot's shed and yard during the 1960s when the depot was being used for Lowestoft Corporation buses. In 2009 the shed building was still being used, but not as a shelter for public transport vehicles.

Located in Norwich Road, adjacent to the depot, was Lowestoft Corporation's electricity generating station. Originally opened in 1901, its output capability was increased in 1903 to cope with the tramway's electrical load.

== Tramcars ==
The fleet consisted of:

- Fifteen open top double deck tramcars
- Four single deck tramcars
- One works car

== Preserved tramcar ==
The East Anglia Transport Museum owns an original 1904 open top double deck Lowestoft Corporation tramcar, which had been a static exhibit but as of 2009 is being restored to fully working condition for operation on the museum's track.
