= Southwold Town Hall =

Municipal building in Southwold, Suffolk, England

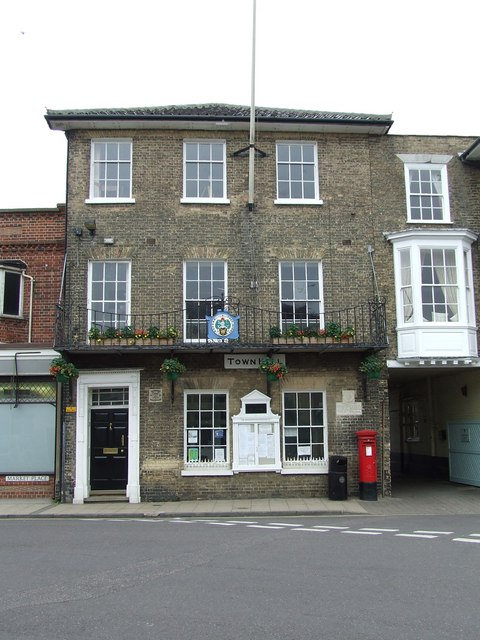
- Southwold Town Hall

- Shown in Suffolk
- 52.3262°N 1.6793°E
- Location: Market Place, Southwold

History
- Built: 1810

Site notes
- Architectural style: Georgian style

Listed Building – Grade II
- Official name: Town Hall
- Designated: 21 April 1949
- Reference no.: 1384392

Southwold Town Hall is a municipal building in the Market Place in Southwold, Suffolk, England. The building, which is the meeting place of Southwold Town Council, is a Grade II listed building.

== History ==
The first municipal building in the town was an ancient guildhall which was destroyed in the great fire which engulfed the town in April 1659. A second town hall was built shortly after the Battle of Solebay in June 1672. It was a single-storey rectangular building on Bartholomew Green with a cottage attached. The historian, Agnes Strickland, speculated that it may have been built as a hospital for the wounded from the battle. After the earlier building had been demolished in 1816, a third town hall, which was also used as a school, was built to the east of St Edmund's Church and was completed in around 1817.

The current town hall was commissioned by a hotelier, Thomas Bokenham, as a private house in around 1810. Bokenham acquired the Swan Hotel, adjacent to his house, in 1819. He died in about 1846 and his wife, Elizabeth, was in ill-health by the mid-1850s. The building was acquired by the borough council and, by the late 19th century, was operating as a town hall.

The design involved a symmetrical main frontage with three bays facing onto the Market Place; in the left hand bay, there was a doorway with a rectangular fanlight flanked by pilasters supporting an entablature and a modillioned cornice. The other two bays on the ground floor formed an opening for the horse-drawn fire engine, while the bays on the first and second floors were fenestrated with sash windows. On the first floor, there was a cast iron balcony which stretched the full width of the building. Internally, the principal room was the council chamber on the first floor.

The building continued to serve as the headquarters of the borough council for much of the 20th century, but ceased to be the local seat of government when the enlarged Waveney District Council was formed in 1974. Instead it became the meeting place of Southwold Town Council.
