= Pakefield =

Suburb of Lowestoft, England

Coordinates: 52.451°N 1.728°E

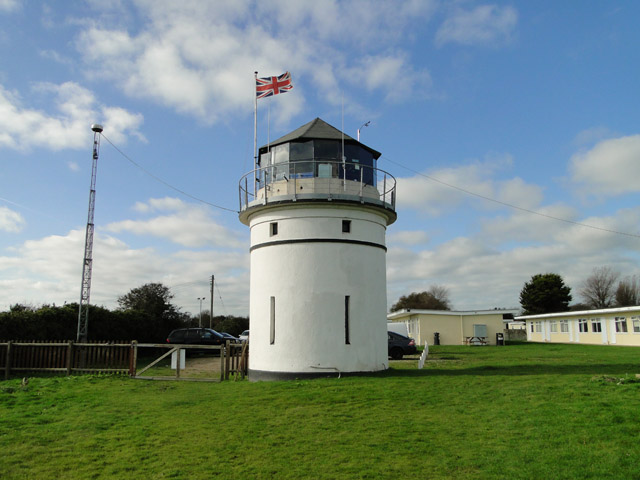
- The former Pakefield lighthouse

- Location within Suffolk
- Population: 6,563 (2011)
- OS grid reference: TM534902
- Civil parish: Lowestoft
- District: East Suffolk
- Shire county: Suffolk
- Region: East
- Country: England
- Sovereign state: United Kingdom
- Post town: LOWESTOFT
- Postcode district: NR33
- Dialling code: 01502
- UK Parliament: Lowestoft

Pakefield is a suburb of the town of Lowestoft, in the East Suffolk district of Suffolk, England. It is located around 2 miles (3 km) south of the centre of the town. It 2011 the ward had a population of 6,563.

Pakefield has boundaries with Carlton Colville and Kirkley. It also borders the parish of Gisleham. The village of Kessingland is 2 1/2 miles (4 km) to the south.

== History ==
Pakefield is the site of one of the earliest known areas of human habitation in the United Kingdom. In 2005 flint tools and teeth from the extinct water vole Mimomys savini, a key dating species, were found in the cliffs. This suggests that hominins can be dated in England to 700,000 years ago, potentially a cross between Homo antecessor and Homo heidelbergensis. Pakefield is also the site of one of the oldest lion fossils outside of Africa, a partial lower jaw belonging to the gigantic Panthera fossilis dating to around 700–800,000 years ago.

Bloodmoor Hill, between Pakefield and Carlton Colville, was the site of settlement in the 2nd and 3rd centuries and the 7th and 8th centuries. The Saxon period consisted of a relatively dense settlement as well as a cemetery which included at least one rich barrow burial. Artefacts were discovered at the site in the 18th century and the Saxon cemetery site was the subject of archaeological investigations between 1998 and 2006.

In the Domesday Book of 1086, Pakefield is called "Pagefella", the name probably coming from the Pagan settlement name of Pagga's or Pacca's field. The village was part of the King's holdings and was part of the Hundred of Lothing. It had a population of about 17 households, including a number of freemen. Part of the tax payment made by the village was 600 herrings.

Pakefield later developed as a fishing community. The former terminus of the Tram Service from Lowestoft is located in the centre of Pakefield and is now the site of the Tramway Hotel. In the modern era, the area played an important role in the Kindertransport programme nine months before the start of World War II. Many children who had not found prearranged foster families were given temporary shelter in the local holiday camp.

In 1931 the parish had a population of 1774. On 1 April 1914 the parish was abolished and merged with Lowestoft, Carlton Colville and Gisleham.

== Coastal erosion ==
Coastal erosion has been an issue in the area for a number of years, although this may have begun to stabilise. A former lighthouse still stands on the coastline and is used by Pakefield Coastwatch.

== Gallery ==
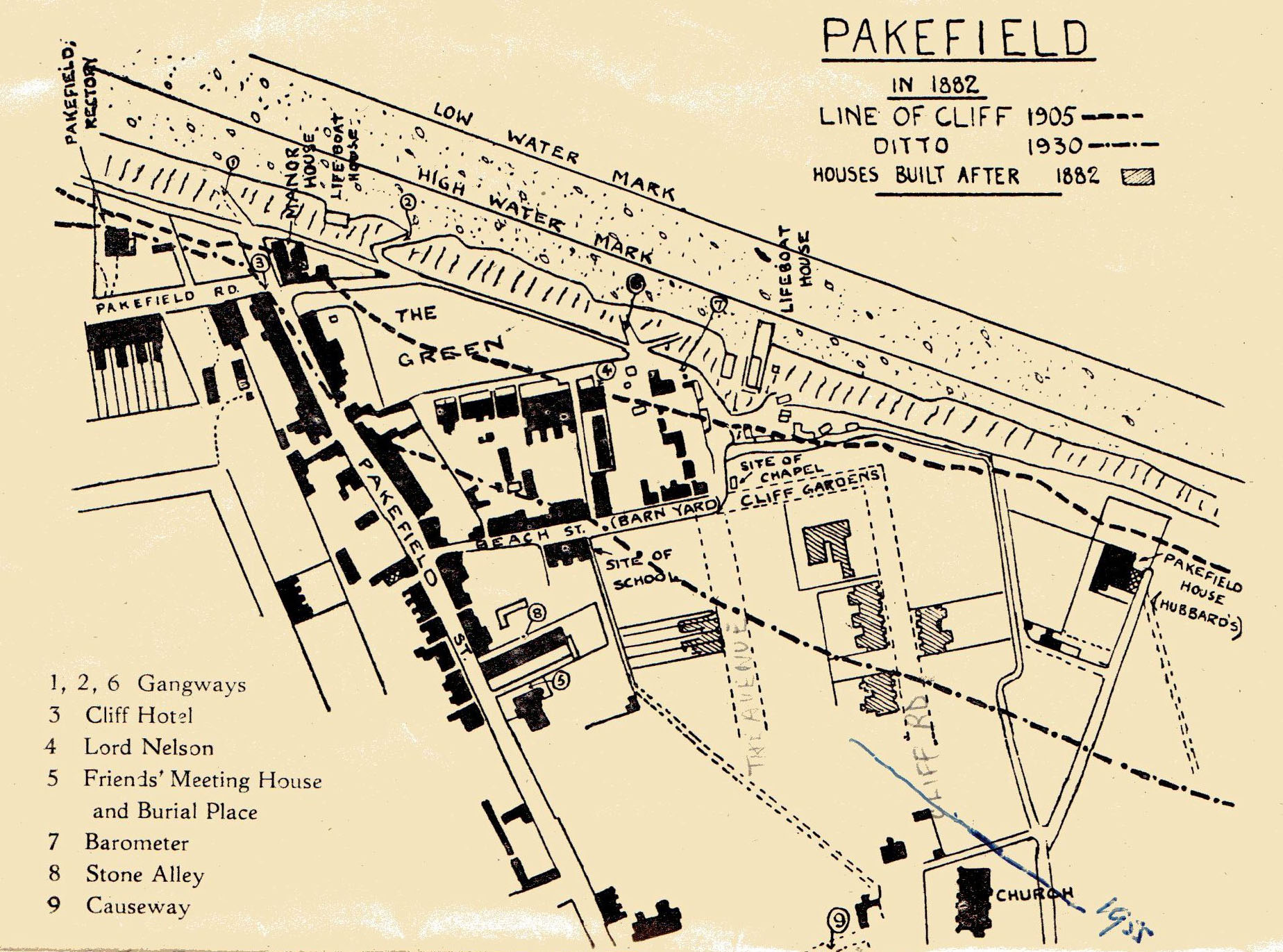

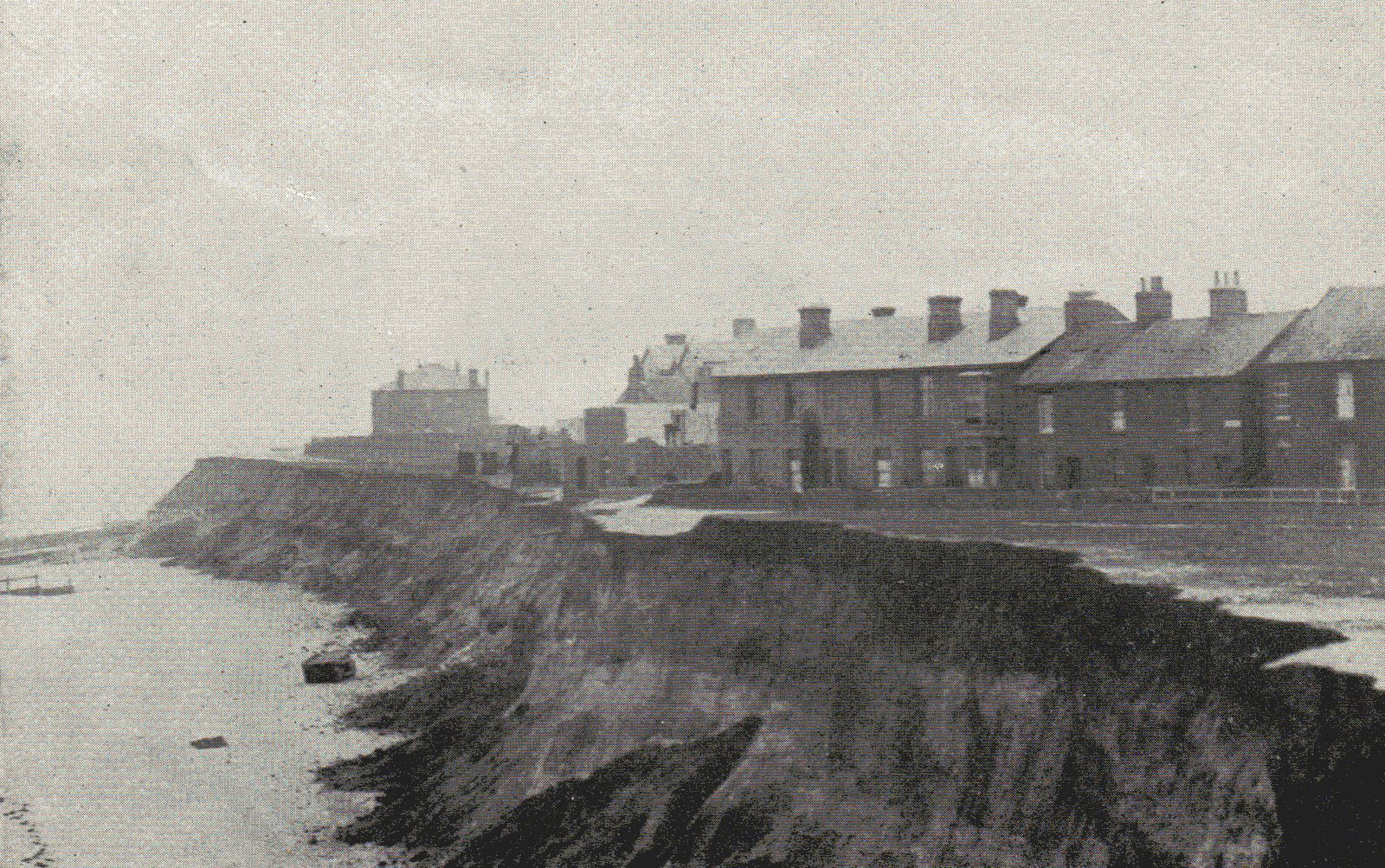

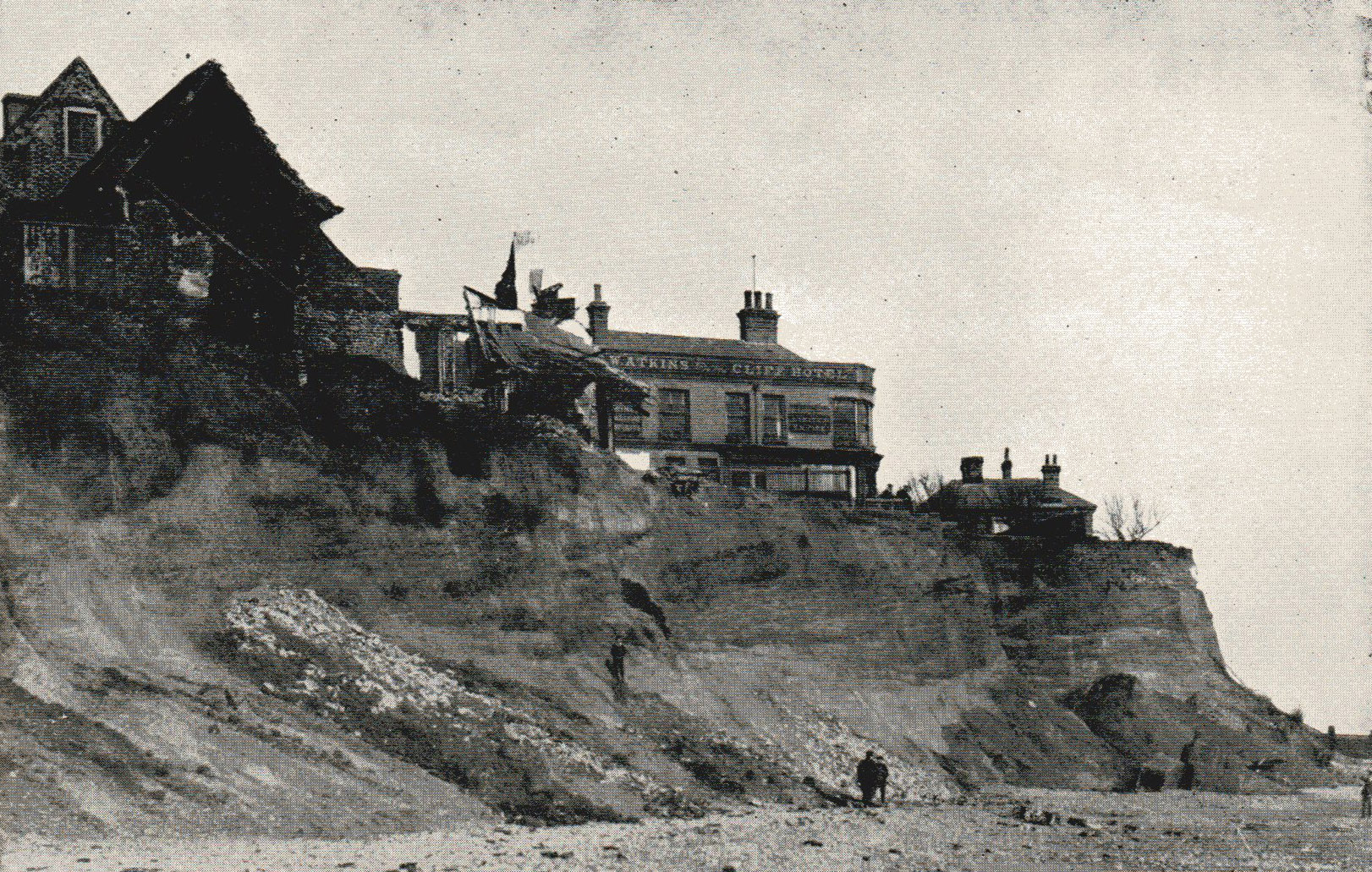

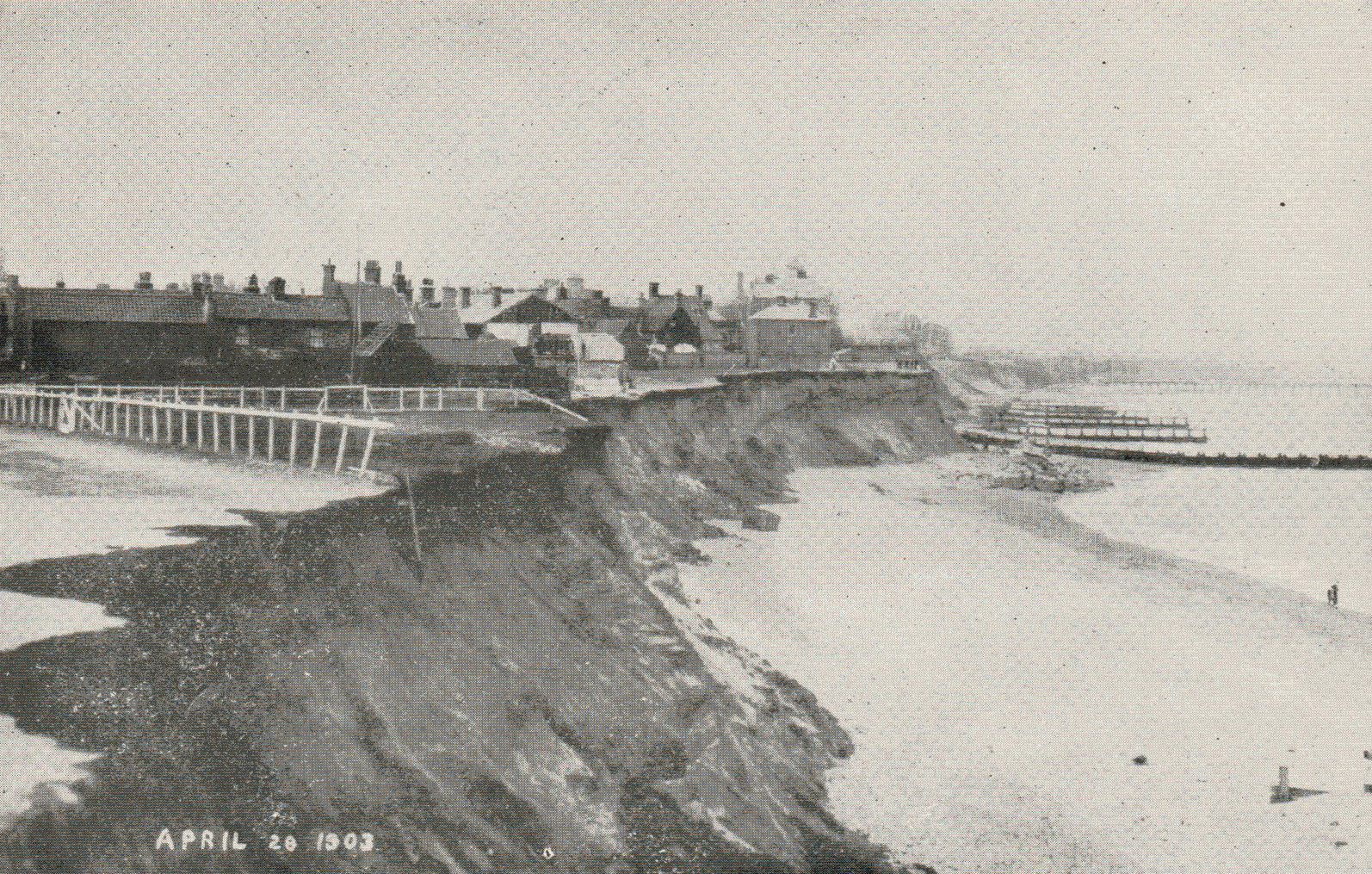

== Governance ==
Pakefield sends two councillors to Suffolk County Council and Waveney District Council. The Member of Parliament is elected through the Waveney seat. For county council elections Pakefield is part of a larger constituency with the neighboring suburb of Carlton Colville.

The current East Suffolk council seat is held by the Labour Party.

== Modern Pakefield ==
The coast is an important tourist destination with a number of holiday destinations, including a Pontins holiday camp. In November 2010 Pontins entered administration, being taken over by the Britannia Hotel Group.

The area has a number of local shops and businesses, including The Seagull theatre and cinema. As well as the Anglican All Saints' Church and St Margaret's Church, Pakefield has a Catholic church dedicated to St Nicholas.

It also has a primary school and a high school. The primary school was awarded a grant by the Royal Society in 2009 to develop a project called 'What has the sea ever done for us'. Pakefield High School opened in September 2011 as part of a reorganisation of education in Lowestoft. This involved the closure of Pakefield Middle School and an extension of the primary school to take children up until the end of year 6. The high school took over the middle school site and buildings.

The Promoting Pakefield Group was formed in 2004 to attempt to promote the area and its interests. A variety of local improvements have been made, including providing a Christmas tree, noticeboards and making improvements to the local war memorial. The group is made up of a number of local businesses and other organisations.

Pakefield Coastwatch operate an independent coastal surveillance station at the old Pakefield Lighthouse located on the grounds of Pakefield Holiday Camp (Pontins). The lighthouse itself was constructed in 1831 to guide boats into Lowestoft harbour through the Newcombe Sand banks, but was de-commissioned in 1864. Pakefield Coastwatch volunteer's restored the lighthouse in 1999, initially joining the National Coastwatch Institute. Now an independent station, the lighthouse is still staffed year round by volunteers in support of HM Coastguard.

== Notable people ==
The author and illustrator Michael Foreman was born in Pakefield in 1938 and attended Pakefield Primary School. He has written about Pakefield in his books.
