= Stephen Southwold =

Stephen Southwold (1887–1964) attended St. Mark's College, Chelsea (1905–07) and worked as a schoolmaster. He served in the Royal Army Medical Corps from 1914 to 1919, then returned to teaching. He became a prolific British writer. Born Stephen Henry Critten, he used a number of pseudonyms, eventually changing his name to one of them, Stephen Southwold. He most often wrote as Neil Bell and also wrote as Miles, Stephen Green, S. H. Lambert, and Paul Martens.

He was born in Southwold, Suffolk. His change of name was apparently a reaction against his father. Initially writing a number of science fiction books, he later concentrated on conventional novels. He also wrote a large number of short stories, many of them under the Southwold name being for children. Bell also wrote several science fiction novels, including The Seventh Bowl (about immortality), The Gas War Of 1940 (about a future war), and the end of the world story The Lord of Life. Who Walk in Fear is a collection of horror stories.

== Works ==
- The Common Day (1915) poetry
- In Between Stories (1923) as Stephen Southwold
- Listen Children: Stories for Spare Moments (1926) as Stephen Southwold
- Once Upon a Time Stories (1927) as Stephen Southwold
- Ten-Minute Tales (1927) as Stephen Southwold
- The Children's Play Hour Book (1927) editor, and sequels
- Listen Again Children! (1928) as Stephen Southwold
- Happy Families (1929) as Stephen Southwold
- Man's Great Adventure (1929) as Stephen Southwold
- The Seventh Bowl (1930) as Miles, then Neil Bell
- True Tales of an Old Shellback (1930) as Stephen Southwold
- Precious Porcelain (1931) as Neil Bell
- Valiant Clay (1931) also as The Gas War of 1940, as Miles, then Neil Bell
- Life and Andrew Otway (1931) as Neil Bell
- The Disturbing Affair of Noel Blake (1932) as Neil Bell
- The Marriage Of Simon Harper (1932) as Neil Bell
- The Lord of Life (1933) novel, as Neil Bell
- Bredon And Sons (1933) as Neil Bell
- Fiddlededee: A Medley of Stories (1933) as Stephen Southwold
- Death Rocks the Cradle: A Strange Tale (1933) as Paul Martens, then as Neil Bell
- The Truth About My Father (1934) as Paul Martens, then as Neil Bell
- Winding Road (1934) as Neil Bell
- The Days Dividing (1935) as Neil Bell
- The Son of Richard Carden (1935) as Neil Bell
- Mixed Pickles (1935) stories, as Neil Bell
- Animal Stories (1935) as Stephen Southwold
- More Animal Stories (1935) as Stephen Southwold
- Forty More Tales (1935) as Stephen Southwold
- Crocus (1936) as Neil Bell
- Lucky Dip (1936) as Neil Bell
- Strange Melody (1936) as Neil Bell
- The Book of Animal Tales (1936) as Stephen Southwold
- The Tales of Joe Egg (1936) as Stephen Southwold
- Testament of Stephen Fane (1937) as Neil Bell
- Pinkney's Garden (1937)
- Precious Porcelain (1938) as Neil Bell
- Love And Julian Farne (1938) as Neil Bell
- One Came Back (1938) as Neil Bell
- The Smallways Rub Along (1938) as Neil Bell
- Now For A Story (1938) as Stephen Southwold
- Not A Sparrow Falls (1939) as Neil Bell
- The Abbot's Heel (1939) as Neil Bell
- So Perish The Roses: a novel of the life of Charles Lamb (1940) as Neil Bell
- The Desperate Pursuit (1941) as Neil Bell
- The Spice of Life (1941) as Neil Bell
- Peek's Progress (1942) as Neil Bell
- The Tower of Darkness (1942) as Neil Bell
- Cover His Face: Thomas Chatterton (1943) as Neil Bell
- Child of My Sorrow (1944) as Neil Bell
- A Portrait of Gideon Power (1944) as S. H. Lambert, later as Neil Bell
- The Handsome Langleys (1945) as Neil Bell
- Life Comes to Seathorpe (1946) as Neil Bell
- A Romance in Lavender (1946) as Stephen Southwold
- Alpha and Omega (1946) stories, as Neil Bell
- Forgive Us Our Trespasses (1947) as Neil Bell
- The Governess at Ashburton Hall (1948) as Neil Bell
- Ten Short Stories (1948)
- Immortal Dyer. A Novel of the Life and Times of Jeff Lister, King of the Commons, the Pride of Norfolk (1948) as Stephen Southwold
- Who Was James Carey? (1949) as Neil Bell
- Scallywag (1949) stories
- Forty Stories (1949) as Stephen Southwold
- I am Legion (1950) as Neil Bell
- Three Pairs of Heels (1950) as Neil Bell
- The Inconstant Wife (1950) as Stephen Southwold
- The Dark Page (1951) as Neil Bell
- One of the Best (1952) as Neil Bell
- Life Comes to Seathorpe (1953) as Stephen Southwold
- Who Walk in Fear (1953) short novels, as Stephen Southwold
- The Secret Life of Miss Lottinger (1953) novella and stories, as Neil Bell
- Many Waters (1954) as Neil Bell
- Tell Me Another (1954) as Stephen Southwold
- My Writing Life (1955) autobiography
- The Custody of the Child (1955)
- The Flowers of the Forest (1955) as Neil Bell
- Luke Bramwhite – His Joyous Life and Happy Death (1955) as Neil Bell
- The Captain's Woman: and other Stories (1955) as Neil Bell
- All My Days (1956) as Neil Bell
- Thy First Begotten (1957) as Neil Bell
- What No Woman Knows (1957) as Neil Bell
- Mrs Rawleigh and Mrs Paradock (1958) as Neil Bell
- The Black Sheep (1958) as Neil Bell
- Forty Stories (1958) as Neil Bell
- At the Sign of the Unicorn (1959) as Neil Bell
- Simon Dale (1959)
- Corridor of Venus (1960) as Neil Bell
- My Brother Charles (1960) as Neil Bell
- 13 Piccadilly (1961)) as Neil Bell
- The Endless Chain (1961) as Neil Bell
- The Narrow Edge (1961) as Neil Bell
- Village Casanova and other Stories (1961) as Neil Bell
- I Paint Your World (1963) as Neil Bell
- The Story of Leon Barentz (1963) as Neil Bell
- The Ninth Earl of Whitby (1966) as Neil Bell
- Missing from Home (1983) as Neil Bell
- The House at the Crossroads
- Love and Desire and Hate stories, as Neil Bell
- Hey, Diddle Diddle as Stephen Southwold
- Ten Old Men as Stephen Southwold
- The Last Bus and other stories
- The Sea Horses and other stories
- Yesterday and Long Ago, as Stephen Southwold
