= Southwold Sailors' Reading Room =

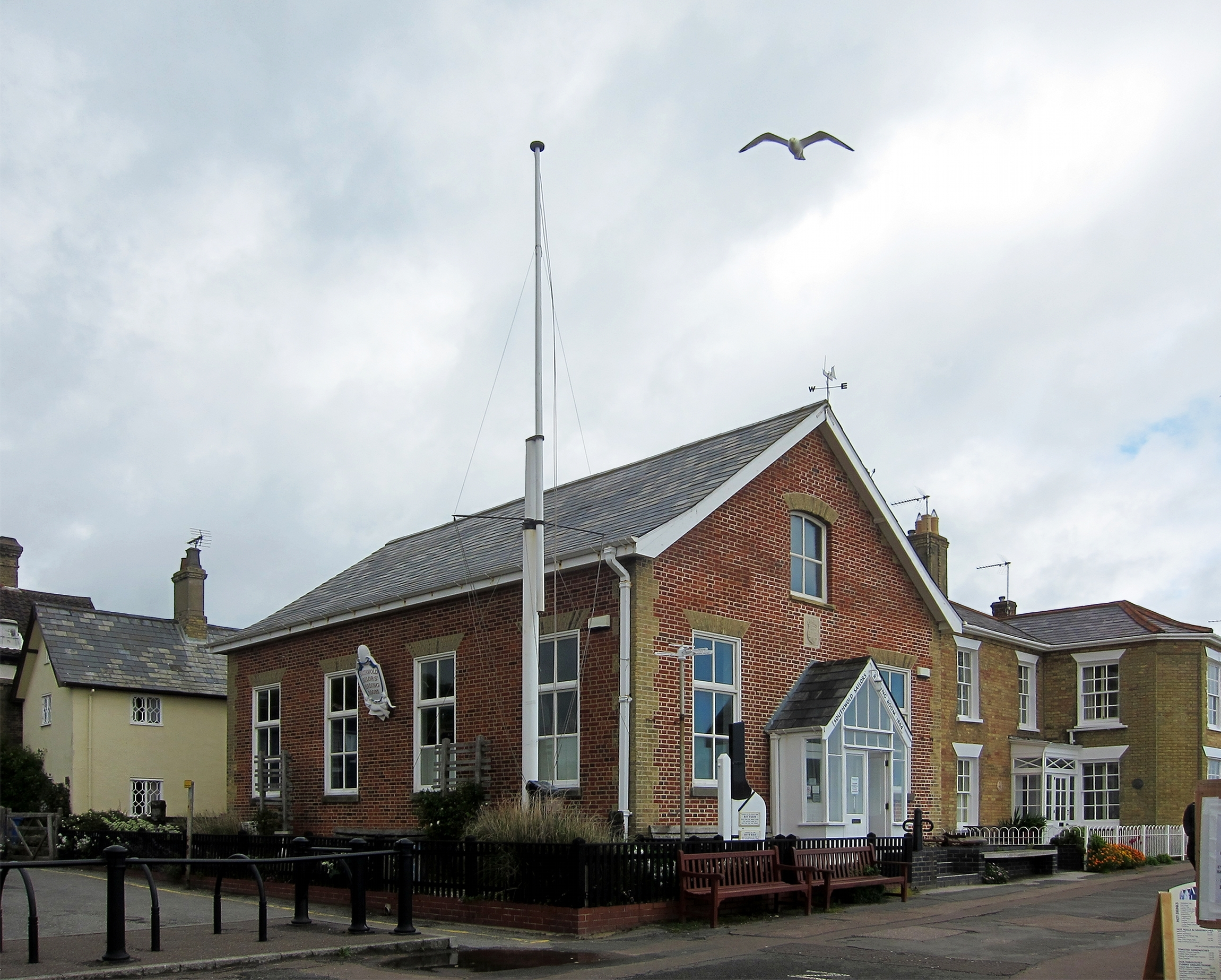
- Southwold Sailors' Reading Room, Southwold, England
- Interactive map of the Southwold Sailors' Reading Room area

General information
- Type: Reading Room
- Location: Southwold, England, England
- Coordinates: 52°19′32″N 1°40′53″E
- Construction started: 1846

Technical details
- Structural system: Timber frame, wood siding

The Southwold Sailors' Reading Room is a Grade II listed building on the seafront at Southwold, England. It was built in 1864 as a place for fishermen and mariners to read, as an alternative to drinking in pubs, and also to encourage the pursuit of Christian ideals. The room has a number of historic displays of model boats and other maritime objects in glass cabinets.

== History ==
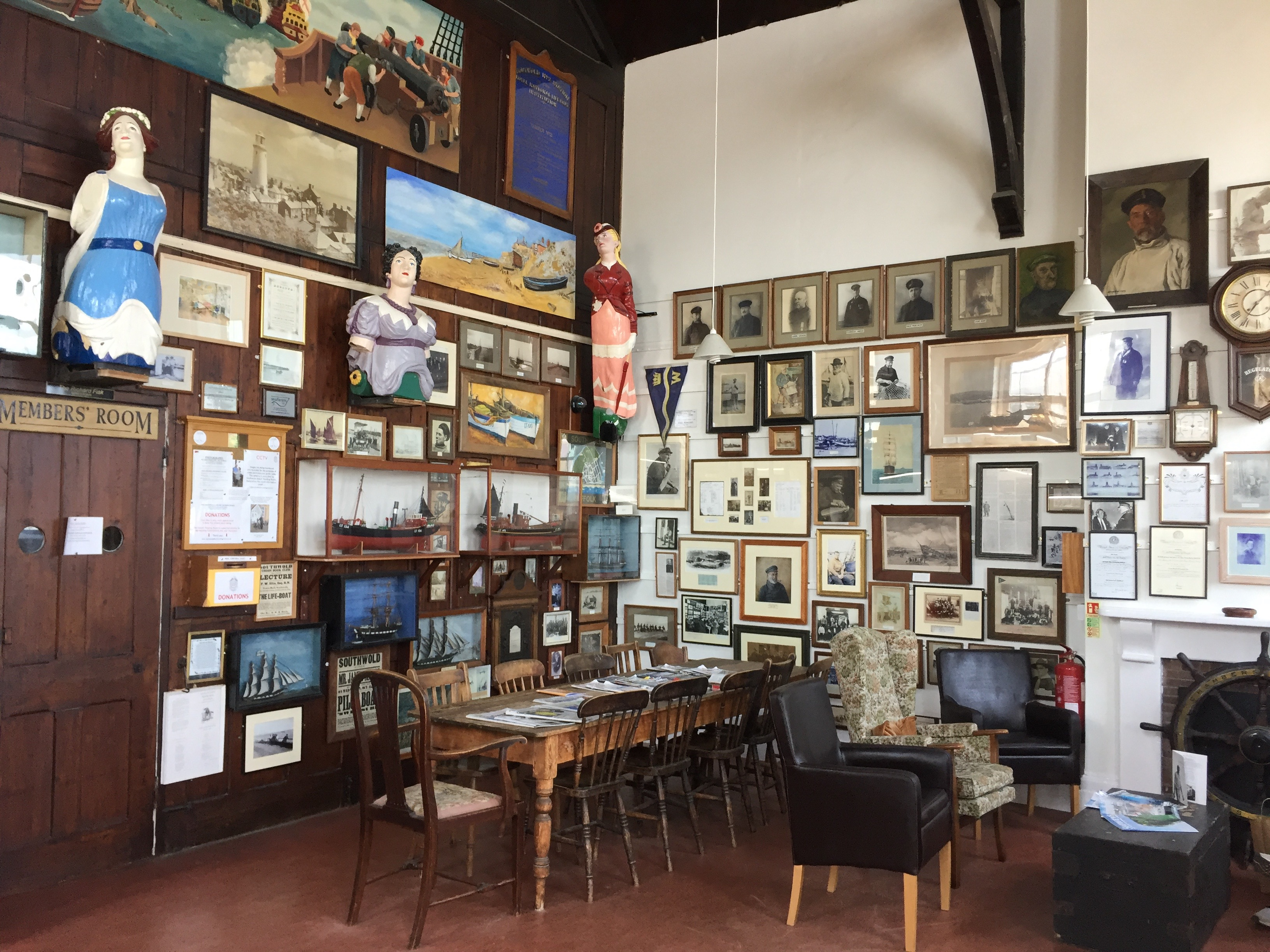
Southwold Sailours' Reading Room Interior

The Southwold Sailors' Reading Room opened on 2 June 1864. The funds for the building were provided by Mrs Frances Rayley, the money being donated in memory of her Royal Navy husband Captain Rayley, who was born in London in 1780 and died in May 1863, having lived in Southwold in his later years.

Whilst living in Southwold Captain Rayley became involved with a number of local organisations supporting the community, taking on roles such as the Chairmanship of Southwold Union Book Club. Following his death, his wife Frances decided that the building of a dedicated reading room in Southwold would provide a suitable memorial to her husband's memory.

The original purpose of the Reading Room was to provide a place for sailors and fishermen to meet, read and talk. This was considered preferable to spending time and money in one of the pubs in Southwold.

Ownership of the Southwold Sailors' Reading Room changed hands four times but at last, in 1972, two local sisters, Miss Nancy Fox and Mrs Joan Philpot, purchased the Reading Room building, and formed the Southwold Sailors Reading Room Association, registered charity No 1150918.\

The Southwold Reading Room Rules has strict rules that include the following prohibitions: "There shall be no Swearing, no Gambling, no Improper Language, or Bad Behaviour...neither Beer nor Spirits". Rule 8 states that "no Newspaper be retained by any Member longer than 10 minutes after it has been asked for, and that no Member on any account be permitted to take any Newspaper out of the Room".
