= Everybody Wins (1990 film) =

1990 film by Karel Reisz

- Theatrical release poster
- Directed by: Karel Reisz
- Written by: Arthur Miller
- Based on: Some Kind of Love Story by Arthur Miller
- Produced by: Jeremy Thomas
- Starring: Debra Winger; Nick Nolte; Will Patton; Judith Ivey; Jack Warden
- Cinematography: Ian Baker
- Edited by: John Bloom
- Music by: Mark Isham
- Production company: Recorded Picture Company
- Distributed by: Orion Pictures (United States); MCEG Virgin Vision (United Kingdom)
- Release date: January 19, 1990
- Running time: 97 minutes
- Countries: United States; United Kingdom
- Language: English
- Budget: $19 million
- Box office: $1,372,350

Everybody Wins is a 1990 mystery thriller film directed by Karel Reisz, starring Debra Winger and Nick Nolte. The screenplay was written by Arthur Miller, based on his one-act play Some Kind of Love Story (1984). It is loosely inspired by an actual 1970s murder case in Canaan, Connecticut which was the subject of the television film A Death in Canaan (1978) directed by Tony Richardson. It was also the last film to be directed by Karel Reisz before his death in 2002.

== Synopsis ==
A prominent doctor from New England has been murdered, and his young nephew has been convicted of the crime. A seductive, possibly unstable woman named Angela Crispini persuades a private investigator, Tom O'Toole, to look into the case. She claims that the youth is innocent and that "everybody" knows who the real killer is.

O'Toole lives with his sister, Connie, who is convinced Crispini is just using him. O'Toole is determined to get to the bottom of the case, in part due to his contempt for Charley Haggerty, the district attorney.

He discovers that Crispini may be a prostitute and that she also had been romantically involved with Haggerty before him. O'Toole enlists the help of a friendly judge, Murdoch, only to see Crispini seduce and manipulate the judge as well.

== Production ==
The film was shot primarily in Norwich, Connecticut. Some of its featured locations include: Norwich City Hall, the Norwich Free Academy, the harbor, Park Church, Canterbury Turnpike, Washington Street and Washington Street Extension, the now-renovated Mobil station, downtown Norwich, as well as many identifiable homes. One scene is set against a backdrop of a colorful (yet no longer existing) mural. The concluding scene features a stately white house on top of a hill off Washington Street Extension.

The film's score features music by Leon Redbone.

This was the last film to be directed by Karel Reisz before his death in 2002.

== Cast ==
- Debra Winger as Angela Crispini
- Nick Nolte as Tom O'Toole
- Will Patton as Jerry
- Jack Warden as Judge Murdoch
- Judith Ivey as Connie
- Kathleen Wilhoite as Amy
- Frank Converse as Charley Haggerty
- James Parisi as Reporter

== Reception ==
Everybody Wins received negative reviews from critics; it holds a 13% rating on Rotten Tomatoes.

One notable exception was Pauline Kael, who praised the film in her last collection, Movie Love. Kael wrote: "Debra Winger is one of the two or three finest screen actresses we've got. For a brief period in the late sixties and early seventies, moviegoers seemed willing to be guided through a movie by their intuition and imagination; if this slyly funny picture about the spread of corruption had been released then, it might have been considered a minor classic. It's satirical in an odd, halucinatory way. There are fresh, often startling scenes. The picture is a classically constructed detective story, with a mysterious woman who lures the fact-oriented man into something that ramifies in every direction and is way over his head."
