= Pakefield Lighthouse =

Lighthouse in Suffolk, England

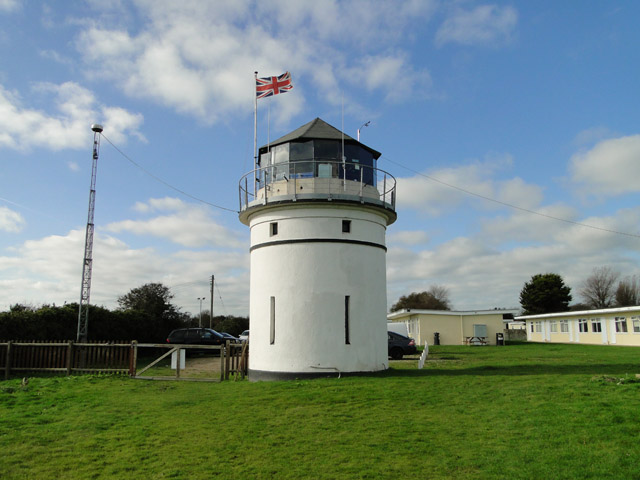
- Pakefield in 2014
- Location: Pakefield; Suffolk; England; United Kingdom
- Coordinates: 52.4370°N 1.7293°E

Tower
- Constructed: 1832
- Construction: brick tower
- Automated: 1975
- Height: 9 metres (30 ft)
- Shape: massive cylindrical tower with balcony, lantern and conical roof
- Markings: white tower, black lantern and roof
- Operator: Pakefield Coastwatch

Light
- Deactivated: 1864
- Focal height: 20 metres (66 ft)
- Range: 9 nautical miles (17 km; 10 mi)

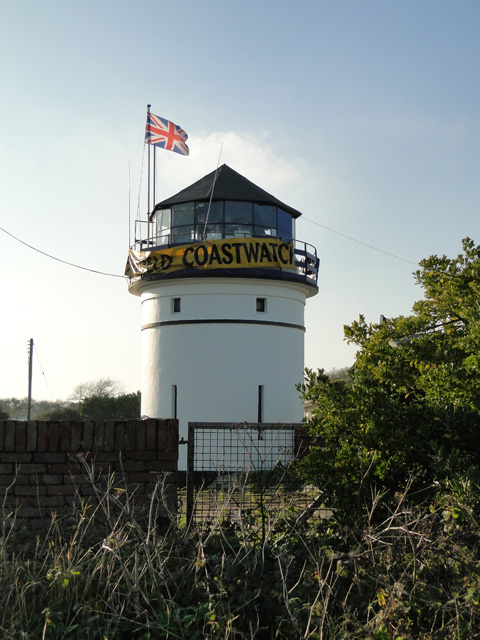
The lighthouse in 2010

Pakefield Lighthouse is a decommissioned 19th century lighthouse which was built near Pakefield a suburb of Lowestoft in Suffolk. The lighthouse tower has been used for a variety of maritime, civilian and military roles, and is currently used as a Coastwatch (now independent) coastal surveillance station.

== Operational history ==
=== Pakefield lighthouse 1832-1864 ===
Completed in 1832 to a design by the architect Richard Suter, it was commissioned by Trinity House to enable a safe passage to be made through Pakefield Gatway (a channel between two shifting sandbanks providing a way into Lowestoft harbour).

The 9 metres (30 ft) high white tower and keeper's accommodation were built within the estate of Pakefield Hall, on low cliffs overlooking the sea at a cost of £821 (equivalent to £79,473 in 2025).

The light was powered by two argand lamps; it originally consisted of a constant white light that could be seen for nine nautical miles. In 1835 the colour was changed to red, as some ships had confused the light with those shining from the windows of clifftop houses in nearby Kessingland.

=== Kessingland light 1864-1886 ===
By the time that land negotiations regarding the lighthouse and access road had been completed in 1850, the channel had moved to the south. The lighthouse continued in use (with charts showing an increased angle of approach through the Gatway) until 1864 when Pakefield lighthouse was decommissioned and a new red sector light was established at Kessingland, to the south.

=== Pakefield light 1886-1906 ===
In 1886, the sandbanks again having shifted, the sector light was moved back to Pakefield, but this time to a location north of the old lighthouse (which remained disused). The fixed red light was now displayed from a hut on the cliff, 'about 660 yards (600 m) in a southerly direction from All Saints' Church'. The following year the angle of the light was altered, the sands again having shifted. In 1905 it was reported that 'considerable alterations have taken place in the depths in Pakefield Gat', shoaling having significantly reduced the depth of water in the former channel. On 1 January 1907 the sector light at Pakefield was discontinued.

== Later history ==
Following its closure in 1864, Pakefield lighthouse remained abandoned for a number of decades until it was subsequently sold to the owners of the Hall in the 1920s, the grounds of which were being used as a campsite; it would eventually become a Pontins holiday camp.

In 1938, prior to the Second World War, the tower became an observation post for the Royal Observer Corps, who were checking for any possible seaborne or air invasion force, with both the roof and lantern being removed to improve visibility.

The tower continued to be used throughout the war, with Auxiliary Territorial Service personnel being stationed at the site. The surrounding holiday campsite was requisitioned and became a transit camp. It was strafed by the Luftwaffe during an air-raid on Lowestoft in 1943, and in the following year a V-1 doodlebug with a defective gyrocompass was spotted travelling towards the lighthouse, until it crashed into the sea at the base of the cliffs nearby.

After the war, the tower was eventually purchased by Pontins, and in the 1960s it was used by the camp's official photographers as a dark room.

In the early 70’s the adjoining keepers accommodation was used as accommodation for the McRoberts family. Bert McRoberts being the bassist with The Harry Bence Orchestra who were the resident band at Pontins for a number of seasons.

== Current use ==
The lighthouse tower was renovated in 2000, by voluntary workers from the local Pakefield Coastwatch group, and it is now used by the group as an independent coastal surveillance station. The lighthouse is staffed 364 days a year, providing support to HM Coastguard.

== See also ==
- List of lighthouses in England
