= The Seagull (theatre) =

Theatre and cinema in Lowestoft, Suffolk, England

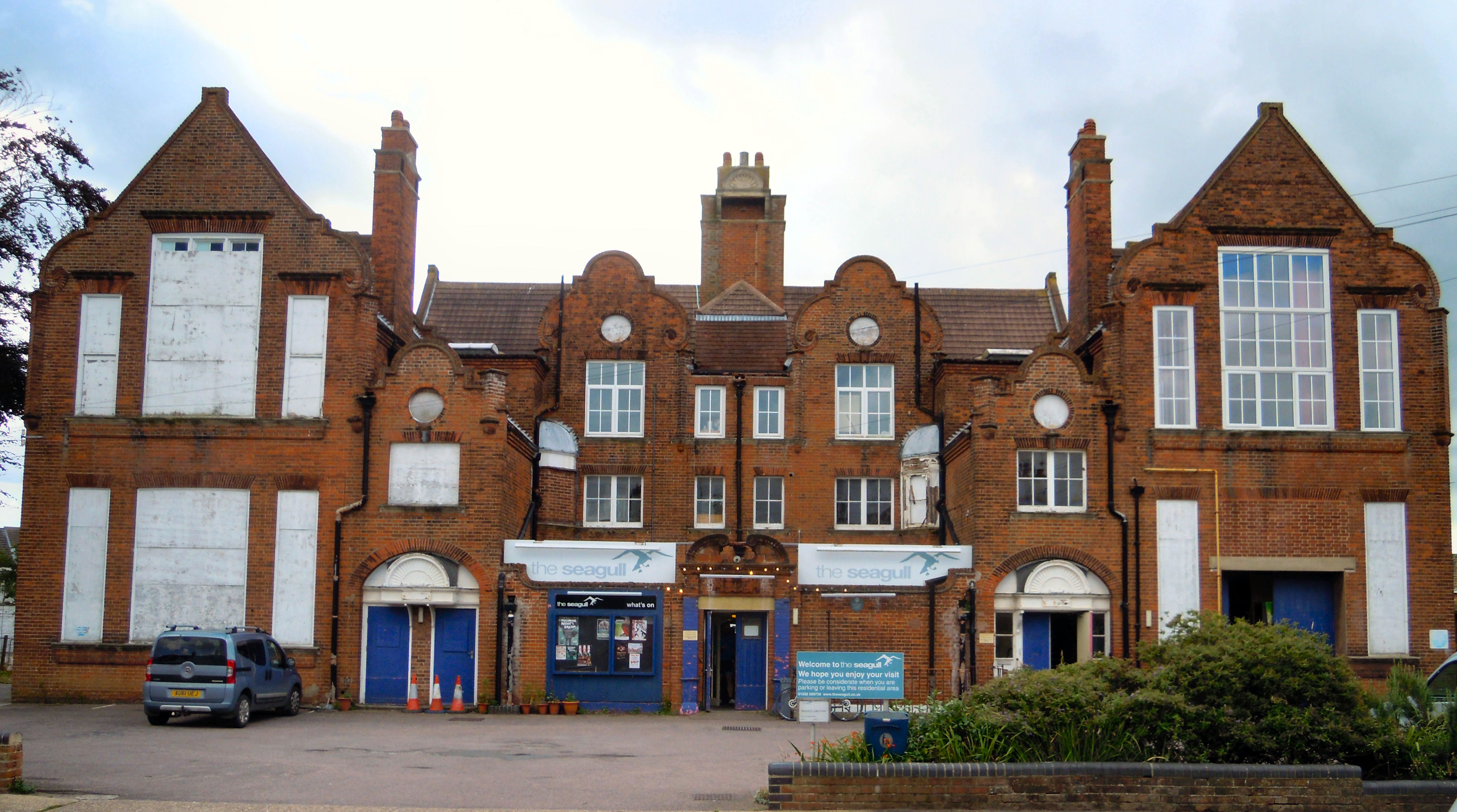
- The Seagull
- Interactive map of The Seagull
- Address: Morton Road, Pakefield; Lowestoft; England, UK
- Coordinates: 52.4566°N 1.7357°E
- Owner: B.I. Fosten
- Operator: Hales Group
- Capacity: 112
- Type: Repertory
- Current use: Active

Construction
- Built: 1895
- Opened: 1967
- Closed: 2006
- Reopened: 2007

Website
- http://www.theseagull.co.uk

The Seagull is a theatre and cinema in Pakefield, a suburb of Lowestoft in Suffolk, run almost entirely by volunteers from the local community. It plays host to regional and national touring theatre companies as well as films and other acts, and runs its own production company known as The Seagull Rep. The slogan for The Seagull is "Transforming the Community through the Arts".

The venue has a main auditorium seating of 112 including space for wheelchair users, as well as a recording studio, dance studio and bar. The venue also has on-site car parking.

== History ==
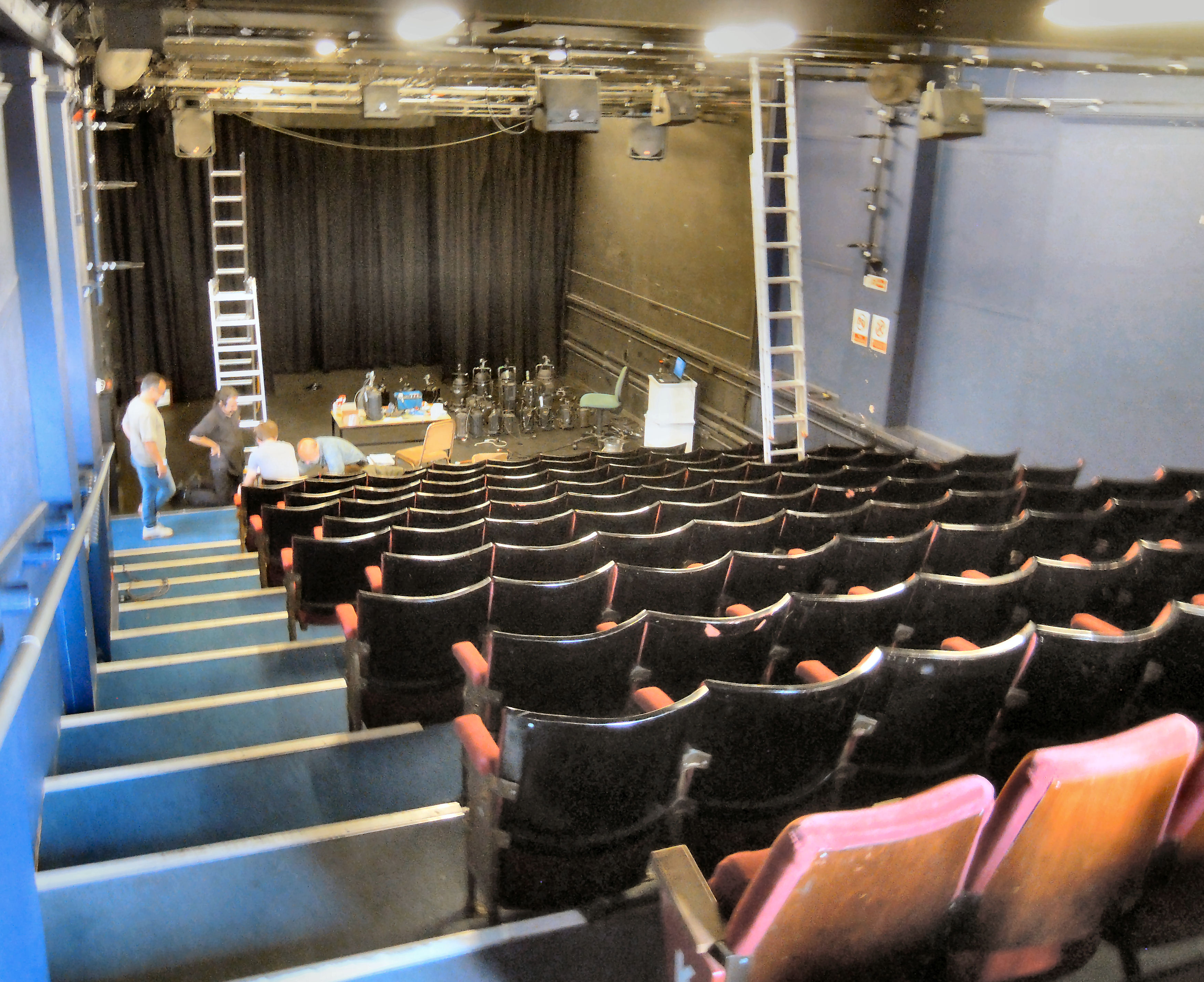
The auditorium during a refit (2016)

The building is of Victorian origin and was previously the site of the Morton Road School from 1897 to 1939. It never reopened as a school after World War II and was used as an annex to Lowestoft College from 1945 as a centre for coachbuilding and engineering courses. The building was converted into a theatre in 1967 and opened as The Seagull.

Suffolk County Council, which owned the theatre, withdrew funding in 2006 as a result of budget cuts and the venue closed. As a result, The SOS ('Save our Seagull') Charity Trust Group was formed with patrons including actress Dame Judi Dench, actor Des Barrit and regional broadcaster Helen McDermott. The campaign was also backed by author Louis de Bernières.

In 2007 the council sold The Seagull for an estimated £250,000 and it was reopened in October 2007 with a gala performance by jazz singer Liane Carroll. It is currently undergoing continued renovation and has received investment in the form of new technical equipment.

A 2009 production of Macbeth featured former model Abi Titmuss as Lady Macbeth, while in 2010 singer Jessie Buckley from the BBC TV show I'd Do Anything performed at the theatre. In 2011 folk musician Jez Lowe from BBC Radio 2 did a show at the theatre, as did the comedian and folk singer Richard Digance in 2015.

Today the theatre hosts a varied programme of plays, concerts, charity events, films and live music shows throughout the year showcasing local talent and regional and national touring theatre companies, musicians and entertainers. In addition to the 112 seat Auditorium the theatre operates three studios for dance and acting schools, rehearsal and performance space. The theatre receives no funding except what it raises through its own activities; the staff includes two paid employees and about 50 volunteers.

== Gallery ==
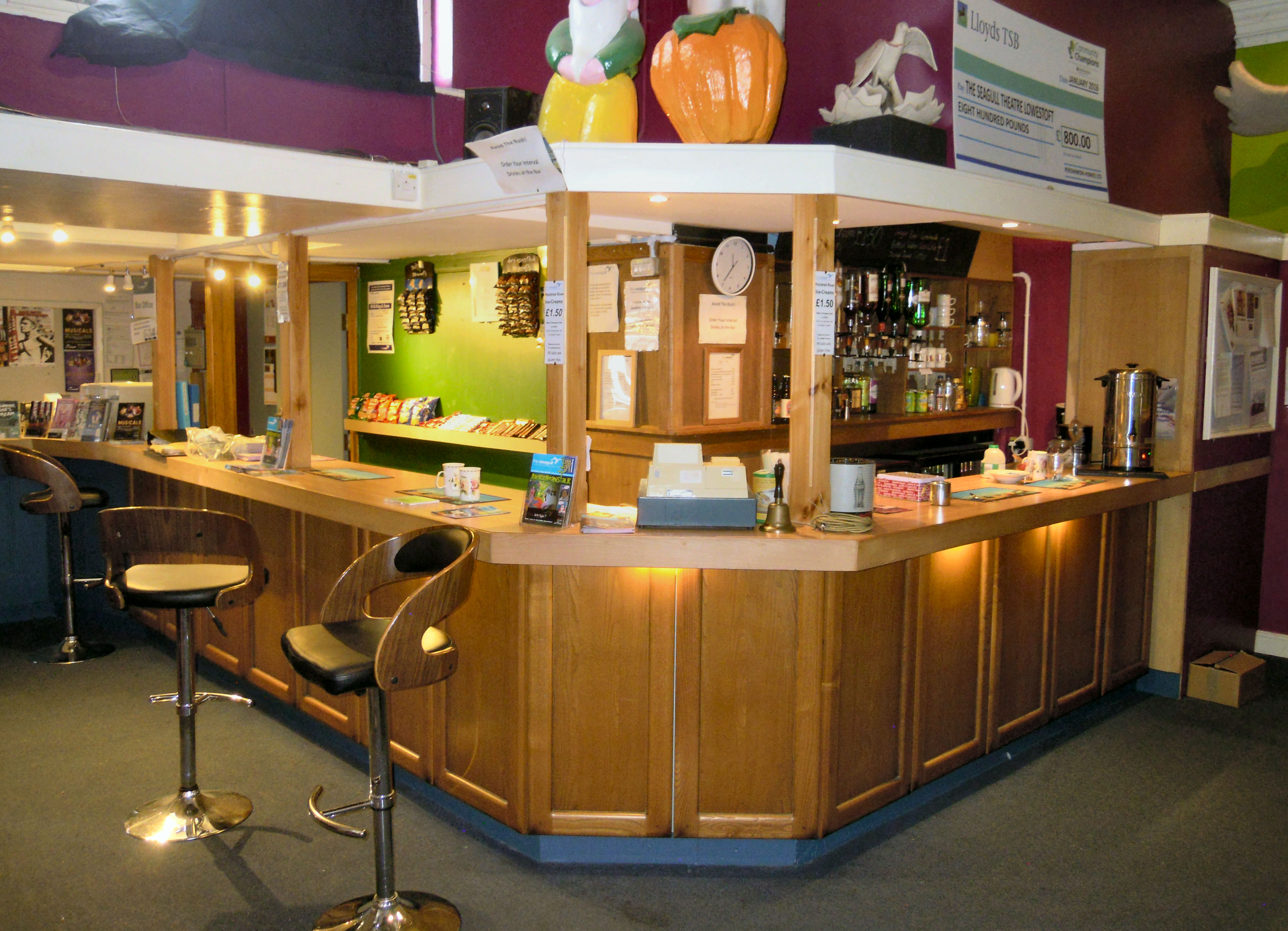
The Theatre Bar

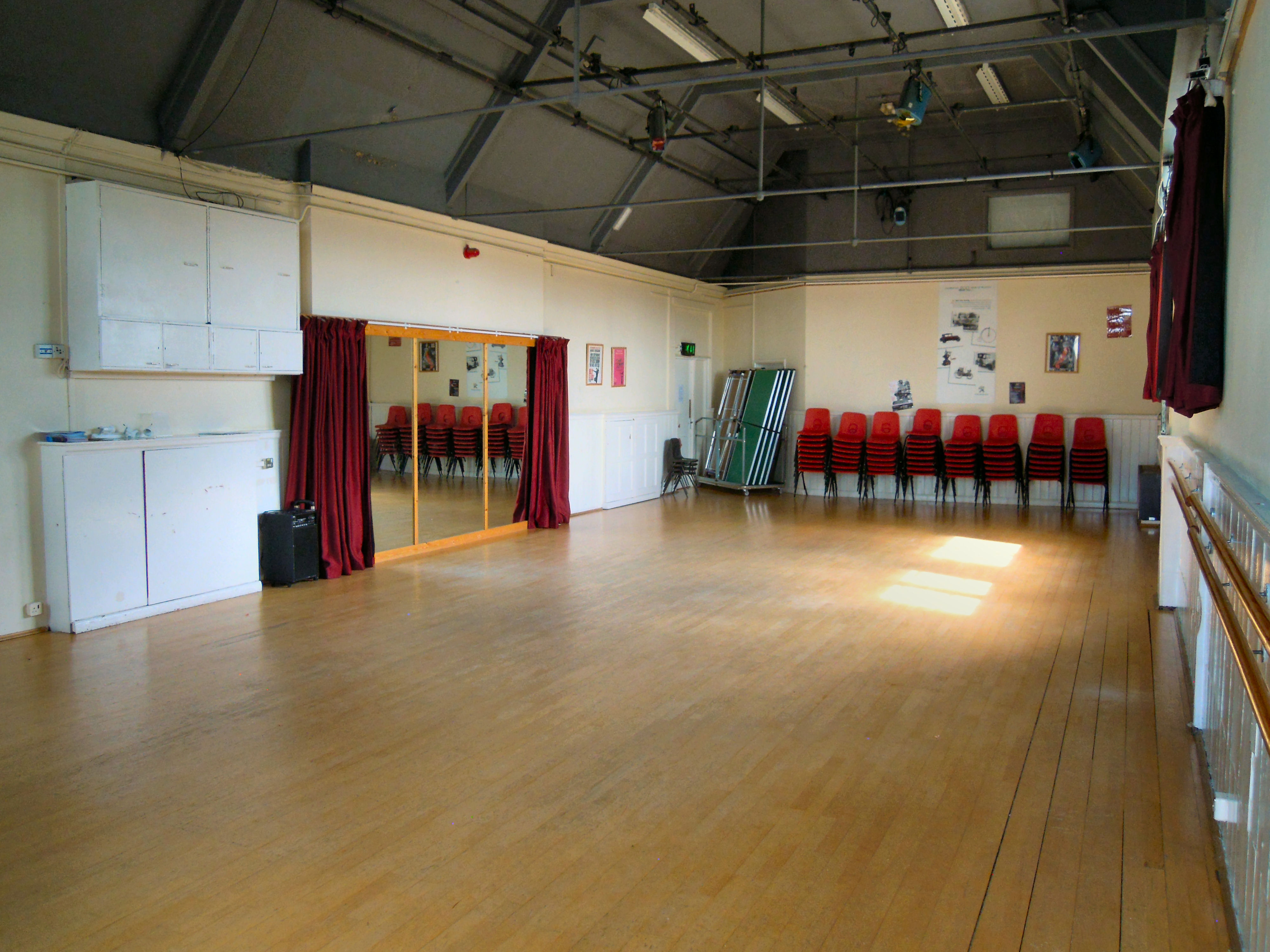
A dance studio
