= Pakefield High School =

Location
- London Road Pakefield; Pakefield; Lowestoft, Suffolk, NR33 7DS; England; 52°26′59″N 1°43′31″E

Information
- Type: Academy
- Established: 2011
- Local authority: Suffolk County Council
- Trust: Clarion Academy Trust
- Department for Education URN: 146909 Tables
- Ofsted: Reports
- Acting Head of School: Dan Bagshaw
- Gender: Co-educational
- Age: 11 to 16
- Houses: Eagles; Bears; Wolves; Stags
- Colours: Royal Blue & Grey
- Website: http://www.pakefield.org.uk

Pakefield High School is a co-educational secondary school located in Pakefield, a suburb of Lowestoft in the English county of Suffolk. The school opened in September 2011, initially with Years 7 and 8 only, using buildings which were previously Pakefield Middle School. The school became the first new state high school to be built in Suffolk for over 20 years as part of the reorganisation of schools in Lowestoft, a process which saw the closure of eight middle schools and a change from transfer to high school at age 13 to transfer at age 11.

The school caters for around 900 students aged from 11 to 16 and cost £26.5 million to build. It was expected to open in September 2010, although this was delayed due to the discovery of Great Crested Newts on the school site. Perry Linsley, formerly head of Stradbroke Business and Enterprise College, was the school's first Headteacher. In January 2016 Linsley announced that he would be leaving the school at Easter 2016 to take up the position of Principal in a new school in Dubai. From September 2016 through to December 2020, Mr Anthony Walker took on the role of Headteacher, overseeing the school's transition to Academy status, before relocating to The Falkland Islands to work within the Senior Leadership Team of his new school. The current Acting Head of School is Mr Dan Bagshaw, who had previously undertaken the role of Senior Deputy Headteacher within the school.

== History ==
Building took place on the site of the former Pakefield Middle School. The government Office of the Schools Adjudicator approved the reorganisation proposal with the recommendation that integrated plans be proposed for the entire site, including Pakefield Primary School.

Building work on the site was delayed in May 2010 when great crested newts, a protected species, were discovered on the site. As a result, Year 9 pupils who were expected to transfer to the school in September 2011 were required to join to one of the other high schools in Lowestoft. Year 7 and 8 pupils used the Middle School buildings in 2011-2012 until the site was completed. Building work was expected to be complete by September 2012, although funding caused problems for the building project.

There was local opposition to the plan to build at Pakefield. Concerns were raised over the size of the site and issues relating to traffic in the area as well as mixing of children from as young as 3 to 16 at the same location. Sites at either Elm Tree Middle School or Gisleham Middle School were proposed as alternatives.

Previously a foundation school administered by Suffolk County Council, in April 2019 Pakefield High School converted to academy status. The school is now sponsored by the Clarion Academy Trust.
