= Elegy for a Lady =

Elegy for a Lady is a one-act play by Arthur Miller. It was first presented in 1982 by the Long Wharf Theatre in New Haven, Connecticut, where it was combined with Some Kind of Love Story under the title 2 by A.M.; the combination of these two plays has also been presented as Two-Way Mirror.

Two-Way Mirror was presented by David Thacker at the Young Vic Theatre in 1989, with Helen Mirren and Bob Peck, At the Courtyard Theatre, Covent Garden Studio Theatre in 2006 and at Theatre by the Lake in 2017.

Cesear's Forum, Cleveland's minimalist theatre company at Playhouse Square, presented the play with a staged version of Sylvia Plath's radio play, Three Women, in 2012.

Elegy for a Lady was first published by Dramatists Play Service in 1982 as ISBN 978-0-8222-0356-8.
