= Some Kind of Love Story =

One-act play by Arthur Miller

Some Kind of Love Story is a one-act play by Arthur Miller. It was first presented in 1982 by the Long Wharf Theatre in New Haven, Connecticut, where it was combined with Elegy for a Lady under the title 2 by A.M.; the combination of these two plays has also been presented as Two-Way Mirror.

Some Kind of Love Story was first published by Dramatists Play Service in 1983 as ISBN 978-0-8222-1053-5.

Miller adapted the play as the 1990 film Everybody Wins, directed by Karel Reisz and starring Debra Winger and Nick Nolte.
