= List of poor law unions in England =

This article lists all English Poor Law Unions.

Note for table: 'PLU' stands for Poor Law Union and 'PLP' stands for Poor Law Parish.

== Bedfordshire ==
Link to 1888 map showing Bedfordshire PLUs; Link to 1909 map showing Bedfordshire PLUs; Link to 1922 map showing Bedfordshire PLUs

Name	Civil Parishes	Notes
Ampthill PLU	Ampthill, Clophill, Cranfield, Flitton, Flitwick, Haynes, Higham Gobion + 2 detached portions, Houghton Conquest, Lidlington, Lower Gravenhurst, Marston Moretaine, Maulden, Millbrook, Pulloxhill + detached portion, Shillington + 2 detached portions, Silsoe, Steppingley, Upper Gravenhurst + detached portion, Westoning.	Remainder of PLU in Hertfordshire.
Bedford PLU	Biddenham, Bletsoe + detached portion, Bolnhurst, Bromham, Cardington, Carlton, Chellington, Clapham, Colmworth, Colworth, Cople, Eastcotts, Elstow, Felmersham, Goldington, Great Barford, Harrold, Kempston, Keysoe, Knotting, Melchbourne, Milton Ernest, Oakley, Odell, Pavenham, Ravensden, Renhold, Risely, Roxton, Sharnbrook, Souldrop, St Cuthburt Bedford, St John Bedford, St Mary Bedford, St Paul Bedford, St Peter Bedford, Stagsden, Stevington, Thurleigh, Turvey, Wilden, Willington, Willshamstead, Wootton, Yelden.	
Biggleswade PLU	Arlesey, Astwick, Biggleswade, Blunham, Campton, Chicksands Priory, Clifton, Cockayne Matley, Dunton, Edworth, Everton, Eyworth, Henlow, Langford, Meppershall, Moggerhanger, Northill, Old Warden, Potton, Sandy, Shefford, Shefford Hardwick, Southill, Stotfold, Sutton, Tempsford, Upper Stondon, Wrestlingworth.	
Hitchin PLU	Holwell + 3 detached portions.	Remainder of PLU in Hertfordshire.
Leighton Buzzard PLU	Billington, Eaton Bray, Eggington, Heath & Reach, Leighton Buzzard, Stanbridge	Remainder of PLU in Buckinghamshire.
Luton PLU	Barton in the Clay, Caddington (Bedfordshire portion), Dunstable, Houghton Regis + detached portion, Humbershoe, Luton, Streatley, Studham (Bedfordshire portion), Sundon, Totternhoe, Whipsnade (Bedfordshire portion).	Remainder of PLU in Hertfordshire.
St Neots PLU	Dean, Eaton Socon, Little Barford, Little Staughton, Pertenhall, Shelton, Tilbrook.	Remainder of PLU in Cambridgeshire & Huntingdonshire.
Wellingborough PLU	Podington, Wymington.	Remainder of PLU in Northamptonshire.
Woburn PLU	Aspley Guise, Aspley Heath, Battlesden, Chalgrave, Eversholt, Harlington + detached portion, Hockliffe, Holcot, Husborne Crawley, Milton Bryant, Potsgrove, Ridgmont, Salford, Tilsworth, Tingrith, Toddington, Westoning (detached portion), Woburn.	

== Berkshire ==
Link to 1888 map showing Berkshire PLUs; Link to 1909 map showing Berkshire PLUs; Link to 1928 map showing Berkshire PLUs

Name	Civil Parishes	Notes
Abingdon PLU	Appleford, Appleton with Eaton, Bagley Wood, Bessels Leigh, Chandlings Farm, Cumnor, Draycot Moor, Drayton, Frilford + detached portion, Fyfield, Garford, Kingston Bagpuze, Lyford, Marcham, Milton, North Hinksey, Radley, Seacourt, South Hinksey, St Helen Abingdon, St Nicholas Abingdon + 2 detached portions, Steventon, Sunningwell, Sutton Courtanay + 4 detached portions, Sutton Wick + 7 detached portions, Tubney + detached portion, Wootton, Wytham.	Remainder of PLU in Oxfordshire.
Bradfield PLU	Aldermaston + 2 detached portions, Ashampstead, Basildon, Beech Hill, Beenham + detached portion, Bradfield, Bucklebury + detached portion, Burghfield, Englefield, Frilsham, Grazeley, Padworth, Pangbourne, Purley + detached portion, Saltney Mead, Standford Dingley, Stratfield Mortimer, Streatley, Sulham + detached portion, Sulhampstead Abbots + 2 detached portions, Sulhampstead Bannister Lower End, Sulhampstead Bannister Upper End, Tidmarsh, Tilehurst, Ufton Nervet, Whitchurch (Berkshire portion) + 4 detached portions, Wokefield + detached portion, Yattendon.	Remainder of PLU in Oxfordshire.
Cookham PLU	Bisham, Bray, Cookham, Hurley, Shottesbrook, Waltham St Lawrence, White Waltham.	
Easthampstead PLU	Binfield, Easthampstead, Sandhurst, Warfield, Winkfield.	
Faringdon PLU	Ashbury, Balking, Bourton, Buckland, Buscot, Charney Basset, Coleshill, Compton Beauchamp, Eaton Hastings, Fernham, Great Coxwell, Great Faringdon, Hatford, Hinton Waldrist, Kingston Lisle, Little Coxwell, Longcot, Longworth, Pusey, Shellingford, Shrivenham, Stanford in the Vale, Uffington, Watchfield, Woolstone.	Remainder of PLU in Gloucestershire & Oxfordshire.
Henley PLU	Remenham.	Remainder of PLU in Buckinghamshire & Oxfordshire.
Hungerford PLU	Avington, Chilton Foliat (Berkshire portion), East Garston, East Shefford, Hungerford (Berkshire portion), Inkpen + 2 detached portions, Kentbury + detached portion, Lambourn, Shalbourne (Berkshire portion), West Shefford, West Woodhay.	Remainder of PLU in Hampshire & Wiltshire.
Newbury PLU	Boxford, Brimpton, Chieveley, Enborne, Greenham, Hampstead Marshall, Leckhampstead, Midgham, Newbury, Sandleford, Shaw cum Donnington, Speen, Thatcham, Wasing, Welford, Winterbourne, Woolhampton + detached portion.	Remainder of PLU in Hampshire.
Oxford PLU	St Aldate Oxford (Berkshire portion).	Remainder of PLU in Oxfordshire.
Reading PLU	St Giles Reading, St Lawrence Reading, St Mary Reading.	
Wallingford PLU	All Hallows, Aston Tirrold, Aston Upthorpe + 2 detached portions, Brightwell + 2 detached portions, Cholsey, Didcot, East Hagbourne, Little Wittenham, Long Wittenham, Moulsford, North Moreton, Sotwell, South Moreton, St Leonard Wallingford, St Mary le More Wallingford, St Peter Wallingford, Wallingford Castle, West Hagbourne.	Remainder of PLU in Oxfordshire.
Wantage PLU	Aldworth, Ardington, Beedon, Blewbury, Brightwalton, Catmore, Chaddleworth, Charlton, Childrey, Chilton, Compton, Denchworth, East Challow, East Hanney, East Hendred, East Ilsley, East Lockinge, Farnborough, Fawley, Goosey, Grove, Hampstead Norris, Harwell, Letcombe Basset, Letcombe Regis, Peasemore, Sparsholt, Upton, Wantage, West Challow, West Hanney, West Hendred, West Ilsley, West Lockinge.	
Windsor PLU	Clewer, New Windsor, Old Windsor, Sunninghill.	Remainder of PLU in Surrey.
Wokingham PLU	Arborfield, Barxham, Broad Hinton + detached portion, Earley, Finchampstead, Newland, Ruscombe, Shinfield + detached portion, Sonning Town, Swallowfield East, Swallowfield West + detached portion, Wapgrave, Whistley + detached portion, Winnersh, Wokingham, Woodley & Sandford.	

== Buckinghamshire ==
Link to 1888 map showing Buckinghamshire PLUs; Link to 1909 map showing Buckinghamshire PLUs; Link to 1928 map showing Buckinghamshire PLUs

Name	Civil Parishes	Notes
Amersham PLU	Amersham, Ashley Green (1897–1930), Beaconsfield, Chalfont St Giles + detached portion, Chalfont St Peter + detached portion, Chartridge (1899–1930), Chenies, Chesham, Chesham Bois, Coleshill, Great Missenden, Latimer (1899–1930), Lee (1838–1930), Little Missenden (1901–1930), Penn, Seer Green.	
Aylesbury PLU	Ashendon, Aston Abbots, Aston Clinton, Aston Sandford, Aylesbury, Bierton with Broughton, Buckland, Chearsley, Cholesbury, Creslow, Cublington, Cuddington, Dinton, Drayton Beauchamp, Fleet Marston, Grendon Underwood, Haddenham, Halton, Hardwick, Hartwell, Hawridge, Hulcott, Kingswood, Lower Winchendon, Ludgershall, Oving, Pitchcott, Quainton, Quarrendon, Stone, Upper Winchendon, Waddesdon, Weedon, Westcott, Weston Turville, Wingrave, Whitchurch, Woodham, Wotton Underwood.	
Berkhampstead PLU	Marsworth, Nettleden, Pitstone (1835–1923).	Remainder of PLU in Hertfordshire.
Bicester PLU	Boarstall.	Remainder of PLU in Oxfordshire.
Brackley PLU	Biddlesden, Turweston, Westbury.	Remainder of PLU in Northamptonshire & Oxfordshire.
Buckingham PLU	Addington, Adstock, Akeley, Barton Hartshorn, Beachampton, Buckingham, Charndon, Chetwode, Edgcott, Foscott, Hillesden, Leckhampstead, Lillingstone Dayrell, Lillingstone Lovell, Luffield Abbey (1858–1930), Maids’ Moreton, Marsh Gibbon, Middle Claydon, Padbury, Pounden, Preston Bisset, Radclive, Shalstone, Steeple Claydon, Stowe, Thornborough, Thornton, Tingewick, Twyford, Water Stratford.	
Eton PLU	Boveney + detached portion, Burnham, Datchet, Denham, Dorney + detached portion, Eton, Eton Wick (1894–1930), Farnham Royal, Fulmer, Gerrard's Cross (1895–1930), Hedgerley, Hedgerley Dean, Hitcham, Horton, Iver + detached portion, Langley Marsh + detached portion, Slough (1894–1930), Stoke in Slough (1894–1896), Stoke Poges + detached portion, Taplow + detached portion, Upton cum Chalvey (1835–1901), Wexham, Wyrardisbury+ 2 detached portions, Wexham, Wyrardisbury.	
Henley PLU	Fawley, Hambleden, Medmenham.	Remainder of PLU in Berkshire & Oxfordshire.
Leighton Buzzard PLU	Cheddington, Edlesborough, Grove, Ivinghoe, Linslade, Mentmore, Pitstone (1923–1930), Slapton, Soulbury, Stoke Hammond, Wing.	Remainder of PLU in Bedfordshire.
Newport Pagnell PLU	Astwood, Bletchley, Bow Brickhill, Bradwell, Bradwell Abbey (1861–1930), Broughton, Castle Thorpe, Chicheley, Clifton Reynes, Cold Brayfield, Emberton, Fenny Stratford, Gayhurst, Great Brickhill, Great Linford, Great Woolstone, Hanslope (Buckinghamshire portion), Hardmead, Haversham, Lathbury, Lavendon, Little Brickhill, Little Linford, Little Woolstone, Loughton, Milton Keynes, Moulsoe, New Bradwell (1919–1930), Newport Pagnell, Newton Blossomville, Newton Longville + detached portion, North Crawley, Olney, Olney Park Farm (1861–1930), Petsoe Manor (1861–1930), Ravenstone, Shenley Church End, Sherington, Simpson, Stantonbury, Stoke Goldington, Tyringham with Filgrave, Walton, Warrington, Water Eaton, Wavendon, Weston Underwood, Willen, Woughton on the Green.	Remainder of PLU in Northamptonshire.
Potterspury PLU	Calverton, Stony Stratford East, Stony Stratford West, Wolverton.	Remainder of PLU in Northamptonshire.
Thame PLU	Brill, Chilton, Dorton, Ickford, Kingsey (Buckinghamshire portion), Long Crendon, Oakley, Shabbington, Towersey, Worminghall.	Remainder of PLU in Oxfordshire.
Winslow PLU	Drayton Parslow, Dunton, East Claydon, Grandborough, Great Horwood, Hoggeston, Hogshaw + detached portion, Little Horwood, Mursley, Nash, North Marston, Shenley Brook End, Stewkley, Swanbourne, Tattenhoe, Whaddon, Winslow.	
Wycombe PLU	Bledlow, Bradenham, Chepping Wycombe (1835–1894), Chepping Wycombe Rural (1894–1930), Chepping Wycombe Urban (1894–1896), Ellesborough, Fingest, Great & Little Hampden, Great & Little Kimble, Great Marlow, Hedsor, High Wycombe, Horsenden, Hughenden, Ibstone (Buckinghamshire portion), Ilmer, Lewknor Uphill (1866–1885), Little Marlow (1835–1885), Little Missenden (1835–1901), Marlow Urban (1896–1930), Medmenham (1835–1945), Monks Risborough, Princes Risborough, Radnage, Saunderton, Stoke Mandeville, Turville, Wendover, West Wycombe, Wooburn, Wycombe (1866–1896).	Remainder of PLU in Oxfordshire.

== Cambridgeshire and Isle of Ely ==
Link to 1888 map showing Cambridgeshire PLUs; Link to 1909 map showing Cambridgeshire PLUs; Link to 1930 map showing Cambridgeshire PLUs

Name	Civil Parishes	Notes
Cambridge PLU	All Saints Cambridge, Holy Sepulchre Cambridge, Holy Trinity Cambridge, St Andrew the Great Cambridge, St Andrew the Less Cambridge, St Benedict Cambridge + 3 detached portions, St Botolph Cambridge, St Clement Cambridge, St Edward Cambridge, St Giles Cambridge, St Mary the Great Cambridge, St Mary the Less Cambridge, St Michael Cambridge.	
Caxton & Arrington PLU	Arrington, Bourn, Caldecote, Caxton, Croxton, Croydon cum Clapton, East Hatley, Elsworth, Eltisley, Gamlingay, Great Eversden, Hardwick, Hatley St George, Kingston, Knapwell, Little Eversden, Little Gransden, Long Stowe, Orwell, Papworth Everard, Papworth St Agnes (Cambridgeshire portion), Tadlow, Toft, Wimpole.	Remainder of PLU in Huntingdonshire.
Chesterton PLU	Barton, Cherry Hinton, Chesterton, Childerley, Comberton, Coton, Cottenham, Dry Drayton, Fen Ditton, Fulbourn, Girton, Grantchester, Great Shelford, Great Wilbraham, Harlton, Harston, Haslingfield, Hauxton + detached portion, Histon, Horningsea, Impington, Landbeach, Little Shelford, Little Wilbraham, Long Stanton All Saints, Long Stanton St Michael, Madingley, Milton, Newton, Oakington, Rampton, Stapleford, Stow cum Quy, Teversham, Trumpington, Waterbeach, Westwick, Willingham.	
Downham PLU	Welney (Cambridgeshire portion).	Remainder of PLU in Norfolk.
Ely PLU	Coveney, Downham, Ely College, Ely St Mary, Ely Trinity + detached portion, Grunty Fen, Haddenham, Intermixed Lands rated to Ely St Mary & Ely Trinity + detached portion, Littleport, Mepal, Stretham, Sutton, Thetford, Wentworth, Wilburton, Witcham, Witchford.	Remainder of PLU in Norfolk.
Linton PLU	Babraham, Balsham, Bartlow, Carlton cum Willingham, Castle Camps, Duxford, Great Abington, Hildersham, Hinxton, Horseheath, Ickleton, Linton, Little Abington, Pampisford, Sawston, Shudy Camps, West Wickham, West Wratting, Weston Colville, Whittlesford.	Remainder of PLU in Essex.
Newmarket PLU	All Saints Newmarket, Ashley cum Silverley, Bottisham, Brinkley, Burrough Green, Burwell, Cheveley, Chippenham, Dullingham, Fordham, Isleham, Kennett, Kirtling, Landwade, Snail Well, Soham, Stetchworth, Swaffham Bulbeck, Swaffham Prior, Westley Waterless, Wicken, Wood Ditton.	Remainder of PLU in Suffolk.
North Witchford PLU	Benwick, Chatteris, Doddington, Manea, March, Welches Dam, Wimblington.	
Peterborough PLU	Standground (Cambridgeshire portion), Thorney.	Remainder of PLU in Huntingdonshire, Lincolnshire & Northamptonshire.
Royston PLU	Abington Pigotts, Barrington, Bassingbourn, Foulmere, Foxton, Guilden Morden, Kneesworth, Litlington, Melbourn, Meldreth, Royston (Cambridgeshire portion), Shepreth, Shingay, Steeple Morden, Thriplow, Wendy, Whaddon.	Remainder of PLU in Essex & Hertfordshire.
St Ives PLU	Boxworth, Conington, Fen Drayton, Lolworth, Over, Swavesey.	Remainder of PLU in Huntingdonshire.
St Neots PLU	Graveley.	Remainder of PLU in Bedfordshire & Huntingdonshire.
Whittlesea PLP	Whittlesey St Mary & Whittlesey St Andrew.	
Wisbech PLU	Elm, Leverington, Newton, Outwell, Parson Drove, Tydd St Giles, Upwell, Wisbech St Mary, Wisbech St Peter.	Remainder of PLU in Norfolk.

== Cheshire ==
Link to 1888 map showing Cheshire PLUs; Link to 1908 map showing Cheshire PLUs; Link to 1927 map showing Cheshire PLUs

Name	Civil Parishes	Notes
Altrincham PLU	Agden, Altrincham, Ashley, Ashton upon Mersey, Aston by Budworth, Baguley, Bexton, Bollin Fee, Bollington, Bowdon, Carrington, Dunham Massey, Fulsham, Hale, High Leigh, Knutsford Inferior, Knutsford Superior, Lymm, Marthall cum Warford, Mere, Millington, Mobberley, Northenden, Northenden Etchells, Ollerton, Partington, Peover Inferior, Peover Superior, Pickmere, Plumley, Pownall Fee, Rostherne, Sale, Tabley Inferior, Tabley Superior, Tatton Park, Timperley, Toft, Warburton.	
Ashton under Lyne PLU	Dukinfield, Godley, Hattersley, Hollingworth, Matley, Mottram, Newton, Stayley, Tintwistle.	Remainder of PLU in Lancashire.
Birkenhead PLU	Bidston cum Ford, Birkenhead, Claughton cum Grange, Liscard, Noctorum, Oxton, Poolton cum Seacombe, Tranmere, Wallasey.	
Chester PLU	Bache, Blacon cum Crabhall, Bridge Trafford, Capenhurst, Caughall, Chester, Chorlton, Christleton, Claverton, Crougton, Dodleston, Dunham on the Hill, Eaton, Eccleston, Elton, Great Boughton, Great Mollington, Great Saughall, Great Stanney, Hapsford, Hole, Ince, Lea, Little Mollington, Little Saughall, Little Stanney, Littlston, Lower Kinnerton, Marlston cum Lache, Mickle Trafford, Moston, Newton by Chester, Picton, Poulton, Pulford, Sacrford, Shotwick, Shotwick Park, Stanlow, Stoke, Thornton le Moors, Upton, Wervin, Wimbolds Trafford, Woodbank.	
Congleton PLU	Alsager, Arclid, Betchton, Blackden, Bradwall, Brereton cum Smethwick, Buglawton, Carnage, Church Hulme, Church Lawton, Congleton, Cotton, Davenport, Elton, Goostrey cum Barnshaw, Hassall, Hulme Walfield, Kermingham, Leese, Moreton cum Alcumlow, Moston, Newbold Astbury, Odd Rode, Radnor, Rudheath (2 detached portions), Sandbach, Smallwood, Somerford Booths, Somerford Radnor, Swettenham, Tetton, Twemlow, Wheelock.	Remainder of PLU in Staffordshire.
Drayton PLU	Tittenley.	Remainder of PLU in Shropshire & Staffordshire.
Hayfield PLU	Disley.	Remainder of PLU in Derbyshire.
Macclesfield PLU	Adlington, Birtles, Bollington, Bosley, Butley, Capesthorne, Chelford, Chorley, Eaton, Fallibroome, Gawsworth, Great Warford, Henbury cum Pexall, Hurdsfield, Kettleshulme, Lower Withington, Lyme Handley, Macclesfield, Macclesfield Forest, Marton, Mottram St Andrew, Nether Alderley, Newton, North Rode, Old Withington, Over Alderley, Pott Shrigley, Poynton with Worth, Prestbury, Rainow, Siddington, Snelson, Sutton, Taxal, Tytherington, Upton, Wildboarclough, Wincle, Woodford, Yeardsley cum Whaley.	
Nantwich PLU	Acton, Alpraham, Alvaston, Ashton juxta Mondrum, Audlem, Baddiley + detached portion, Baddington, Barthomley, Basford, Batherton, Beeston, Bickerton, Blakenhall, Bridgemere, Brindley + detached portion, Broomhall, Buerton, Bulkeley, Bunburt, Burland, Burwardsley, Calveley, Checkley cum Wrinehill, Cholmondeley, Cholmondeston, Chorley, Chorlton, Church Coppenhall, Church Minshull, Coole Pilate, Crewe, Dodcott cum Wilkesley + 2 detached portions, Doddington, Eaton, Edleston, Egerton, Faddiley, Hankelow, Haslington, Hatherton, Haughton, Henhull, Hough, Hunsterson, Hurleston, Lea, Minshull Vernon, Monks Coppenhall, Nantwich, Newhall, Peckforton, Poole, Ridley, Rope, Rushton, Shavington cum Cresty, Sound, Spurstow, Stapeley, Stoke, Tarporley, Tilstone Fearnall, Tiverton, Utkinton, Walgherton, Wardle, Warmingham, Wenbury cum Frith, Weston, Wettenhall, Willaston, Wistaston, Woodcott, Woolstanwood, Worleston, Wybunbury.	
Northwich PLU	Acton, Allostock, Anderton, Barnton, Birches, Bostock, Byley cum Yatehouse, Castle Northwich, Clive, Cogshall, Comberbach, Crowton, Croxton, Cuddington, Darnhall, Davenham, Delamere, Eaton, Eddisbury, Hartford, Hulse, Kinderton cum Hulme, Lach Dennis, Leftwich, Little Budworth, Little Leigh, Lostock Gralam + detached portion, Marbury, Marston + detached portion, Marton, Mooresbarrow cum Parme, Moulton, Nether Peover, Newall, Newton, Oakmere, Occlestone, Onston, Oulton Lowe, Over, Ravenscroft, Rudheath + 4 detached portions, Shipbrook, Shurlach cum Bradford, Sproston, Stanthorne, Stublach, Sutton, Wallerscote, Weaver, Weaverham cum Milton, Wharton, Whatcroft, Wimboldsley, Wincham, Winnington, Witton cum Twambrooks.	
Runcorn PLU	Acton Grange, Alvanley, Antrobus, Appleton, Aston by Sutton, Aston Grange, Bartington, Clifton, Crowley, Daresbury, Dutton, Frodsham, Frodsham Lordship, Great Budworth, Halton, Hatton, Helsby, Higher Whitley, Keckwick, Kingsley, Kingswood, Lower Whitley, Manley, Moore, Newton by Daresbury, Newton by Frodsham, Norley, Norton, Preston on the Hill, Runcorn, Seven Oaks, Stockham, Stretton, Sutton, Walton Inferior, Walton Superior, Weston.	
Stockport PLU	Bosden, Bramhall, Bredbury, Brinnington, Cheadle, Handforth, Hyde, Marple, Norbury, Offerton, Romiley, Stockport, Stockport Etchells, Topkington, Werneth.	Remainder of PLU in Lancashire.
Tarvin PLU	Aldersey, Aldford, Ashton, Barrow, Barton, Broxton, Bruen Stapleford, Buerton, Burton, Caldecott, Chowley, Churton by Aldford, Churton by Farndon, Churton Heath, Clotton Hoofield, Cluton, Coddington, Cotton Abbotts, Cotton Edmunds, Crafton, Crewe, Duddon, Edgerley, Farndon, Foulk Stapleford, Garden, Golborne Bellow, Golborne David, Guilden Sutton, Handley, Harthill, Hatton, Hockenhull, Horton, Horton cum Peel, Huntington, Huxley, Iddinshall, Kelsall, King's Marsh, Lea Newbold, Mouldsworth, Newton by Tattenhall, Prior's Heys, Rowton, Saighton, Stretton, Tarvin, Tattenhall, Tilston, Waverton, Willington.	
Warrington PLU	Grappenhall, Latchford, Thelwall.	Remainder of PLU in Lancashire.
Whitchurch PLU	Agden, Bickley, Bradley, Chidlow, Chorlton, Cuddington, Duckington, Edge, Hampton, Larkton, Macefen, Malpas, Marbury cum Quoisley, Newton by Malpas, Norbury, Oldcastle, Overton, Stockton, Tusingham cum Grindley, Wigland, Wirswall, Wychough.	Remainder of PLU in Shropshire, England & Flintshire, Wales.
Wirral PLU	Barnston, Brimstage, Bromborough, Burton, Caldy, Childer Thornton, Eastham, Frankby, Gayton, Grange, Greasby, Great Meolse, Great Neston, Great Sutton, Heswall cum Oldfield, Higher Bebington, Hoose, Hooton, Irby, Landican, Ledsham, Leighton, Little Meolse, Little Neston, Little Sutton, Lower Bebington, Moreton, Ness, Netherpool, Newton cum Larton, Overpool, Pensby, Poolton cum Spital, Prenton, Puddington, Raby, Saughall Massie, Storeton, Thingwall, Thornton Hough, Thurstaston, Upton, West Kirby, Whitby, Willaston, Woodchurch.	
Wrexham PLU	Church Shocklach, Shocklach Oviatt, Threapwood (Cheshire portion).	Remainder of PLU in Denbighshire & Flintshire, Wales.

== Cornwall ==
Link to 1888 map showing Cornwall PLUs; Link to 1909 map showing Cornwall PLUs; Link to 1928 map showing Cornwall PLUs

Name	Civil Parishes	Notes
Bodmin PLU	Blisland, Bodmin, Bodmin Borough, Cardinham + detached portion, Egloshayle, Helland, Lanhydrock, Lanivet, Lanliver, Lostwithiel, Luxulian, St Endellion, St Kew, St Mabyn, St Minver Highlands, St Minver Lowlands, St Tudy, St Winnow, Temple, Warleggon, Withiel.	
Camelford PLU	Advent, Davidstow, Forrabury, Lanteglos + detached portion, Lesnewth, Michaelstow, Minster, Otterham, St Breward, St Clether, St Juliot, St Teath, Tintagel, Trevalga.	
Falmouth PLU	Budock + detached portion, Constantine, Falmouth, Falmouth Borough, Mabe, Mawnan, Mylor, Penryn, Perranarworthal, St Gluvias + 2 detached portions.	
Helston PLU	Breage, Crowan, Cury, Germoe, Grade + 2 detached portions, Gunwalloe, Helston, Landewednack, Manaccan, Mawgan in Meneage, Mullion, Ruan Major, Ruan Minor, Sithney, St Anthony in Meneage, St Keverne, St Martin in Meneage, Wendron.	
Holsworthy PLU	North Tamerton.	Remainder of PLU in Devon.
Isles of Scilly PLP	Isles of Scilly.	
Launceston PLU	Altarnun, Boyton, Egloskerry, Laneast, Lawhitton, Lewannick, Lezant, North Hill, South Petherwin, St Mary Magdalen Launceston, St Stephen Launceston, St Thomas Street Launceston, St Thomas the Apostle Launceston, Stoke Climsland, Tremaine, Treneglos, Tresmeer, Trewen, Warbstow.	Remainder of PLU in Devon.
Liskeard PLU	Boconnoc, Braddock, Callington, Duloe, East Looe, Lanreath, Lansallos, Lanteglos, Linkinhorne, Liskeard, Liskeard Borough, Menheniot, Morval, Pelynt, South Hill, St Cleer, St Dominick, St Ive, St Keyne, St Martin, St Neot, St Pinnock, St Veep, Talland, West Looe.	
Penzance PLU	Gulval, Ludgvan, Madron + detached portion, Marazion, Morvah, Paul, Penzance, Perranuthno, Sancreed, Sennen, St Burian, St Erth, St Hilary, St Ives, St Just, St Levan, St Michael's Mount, Towednack, Uny Lelant, Zennor.	
Redruth PLU	Camborne, Gwennap, Gwinear, Gwithian, Illogann, Phillack, Redruth, Stithians.	
St Austell PLU	Creed, Fowey, Grampound, Mevagissey, Roche, St Austell, St Blazey, St Dennis, St Ewe, St Goran, St Mewan, St Michael Caerhays, St Sampson, St Stephen in Brannel, Tywardreath.	
St Columb PLU	Colan, Crantock, Cubert, Little Petherick, Mawgan in Pyder, Newlyn, Padstow, St Breock, St Columb Major, St Columb Minor, St Enoder, St Ervan, St Eval, St Issey, St Merryn, St Wenn.	
St Germans PLU	Antony, Botus Fleming, Landrake with St Erney, Landulph, Maker, Pillaton, Quethiock, Rame, Saltash, Sheviock, St Germans, St John, St Mellion, St Stephens.	
Stratton PLU	Jacobstow, Kilkhampton, Launcells, Marhamchurch, Moorwinstow, Poughill, Poundstock, St Gennys, Stratton, Week St Mary, Whitstone.	
Tavistock PLU	Calstock.	Remainder of PLU in Devon.
Truro PLU	Cornelly, Cuby, Feock, Gerrans, Kea, Kenwyn + detached portion, Ladock, Lamorran, Lands Common to Philleigh & Ruan Lanihorne + detached portion, Merther, Perranzabuloe, Philleigh, Probus, Ruan Lanihorne, St Agnes, St Allen, St Anthony in Roseland, St Clement, St Erme + detached portion, St Just in Roseland, St Mary Truro, St Michael Penkevil, Tregavethan, Tregoney, Veryan.	

== Cumberland ==
Link to 1888 map showing Cumberland PLUs; Link to 1909 map showing Cumberland PLUs; Link to 1924 map showing Cumberland PLUs

Name	Civil Parishes	Notes
Alston PLP	Alston.	
Bootle PLU	Birker & Austhwaite, Bootle, Corney, Drigg, Eskdale & Wasdale, Irton Santon & Melthwaite, Millom, Muncaster, Ulpha, Waberthwaite, Whicham, Whitbeck.	
Brampton PLU	Askerton, Brampton, Burtholme, Carlatton, Castle Carrock, Cumrew, Cumwhitton, Farlam, Geltsdale, Hayton, Irthington, Kingwater, Midgeholme, Nether Denton, Upper Denton, Walton, Waterhead.	
Carlisle PLU	Beaumont, Burgh by Sands, Caldewgate, Crosby upon Eden, Cummersdale, Dalston, Eaglesfield Abbey Carlisle, Grinsdale, Kingmoor, Kirkandrews upon Eden, Orton, Rickergate Carlisle, Rockcliff, St Cuthbert Within Carlisle, St Cuthbert Without Carlisle, St Mary Within Carlisle, Stanwix, Warwick, Wetheral, Wreay.	
Cockermouth PLU	Above Derwent, Bassenthwaite, Bewaldeth & Snittlegarth + detached portion, Blindbothel, Blindcrake Isell & Redmain, Borrowdale, Bothel & Threapland, Brackenthwaite, Bridekirk, Briery, Brigham, Buttermere, Camerton, Cloffocks, Cockermouth, Crosscanonby, Dean, Dearham, Dovenby, Eaglesfield, Ellenborough & Ewanrigg, Embleton, Flimby, Gilcrux, Great Broughton, Great Clifton, Greysouthen, Isell Old Park, Keswick, Little Broughton, Little Clifton, Lorton, Loweswater, Mosser, Oughterside & Allerby, Papcastle, Plumbland, Ribton, Seaton, Setmurthy, Skiddaw, St John's Castlerigg & Wythburn, Stainburn, Sunderland, Tallentire, Underskiddaw, Whinfell, Winscales + 3 detached portions, Wmbleton, Workington, Wythop.	
Longtown PLU	Arthuret, Belbank, Bewcastle, Hethersgill, Kirkandrews Middle, Kirkandrews Nether, Kirklinton Middle, Moat, Nicholforest, Scaleby, Solport, Stapleton, Trough, Westlinton.	
Penrith PLU	Ainstable, Berrier & Murrah, Bowscale, Castle Gowerby, Catterlen, Croglin, Culgaith, Dacre, Edenhall, Gamblesby, Glassonby, Great Salkeld, Greystoke including Johnsy, Little Blencow, Motherby and Gill, Hesket in the Forest, Hunsonby & Winskill, Hutton in the Forest, Hutton John, Hutton Roof, Hutton Soil, Kirkland & Blencarn, Kirkoswald, Lazonby, Little Salkeld, Longwathby, Matterdale, Melmerby, Middlesceugh & Braithwaite, Mosedale, Mungrisdale, Newton Regny, Ousby, Penrith, Plumpton Wall, Renwick, Skelton, Skirwith, Staffield, Threlkeld, Watermillock.	
Whitehaven PLU	Arlecdon, Cleator, Distington, Egremont, Ennerdale & Kinniside, Gosforth, Hale, Harrington, Hensingham & Low Keekle, Lamplugh, Lowside Quarter, Moresby, Nether Wasdale + detached portion, Parton, Ponsoney, Preston Quarter, Rottington, Salter & Eskett, Sandwith, St Bees, St Bridget Beckermet, St John Beckermet, Weddiker, Whitehaven.	
Wigton PLU	Aikton, Allhallows, Aspatria & Brayton, Blencogo, Blennerhasset & Kirkland, Boltons, Bowness, Bromfield Crookdale & Scales, Caldbeck, Dundraw Kelsick & Wheyrigg, Hayton & Meald, High Ireby, Holme Abbey, Holme East Waver, Holme Low, Holme St Cuthbert, Kirkbampton, Kirkbride, Langrigg & Mealrigg, Low Ireby, Oulton, Sebergham, Skinburness Marsh common to Holme Low, Holme Abbey and Holme St Cuthbert, Thursby, Torpenhow & Whitrigg, Uldale, Waverton High & Low, West Newton & Allonby, Westward, Wigton cum Woodside.	

== Derbyshire ==
Link to 1888 map showing Derbyshire PLUs; Link to 1908 map showing Derbyshire PLUs; Link to 1922 map showing Derbyshire PLUs

Name	Civil Parishes	Notes
Ashbourne PLU	Alkmonton, Ashbourne, Atlow, Ballidon, Biggin, Bonsall, Bradbourne, Bradley, Brailsford, Brassington, Callow, Carsington, Clifton, Eaton & Alsop, Edlaston & Wyaston, Fenny Bentley, Hognaston, Hollington, Hopton, Hulland, Hulland Ward, Hulland Ward Intakes, Hungry Bentley, Isle, Kirk Ireton, Kniveton, Lea Hall, Longford, Mapleton, Mercaston, Middleton, Nether Quarter + detached portion, Newton Grange, Offcote & Underwood, Osmaston, Rodsley, Shirley, Snelston, Sturston, Thorpe, Tissington, Town Quarter, Yeaveley, Yeldersley.	Remainder of PLU in Staffordshire.
Ashby de la Zouch PLU	Calke, Hartshorn, Measham (part), Oakthorpe & Donisthorpe, Smisby, The Boundary, Ticknall, Willesley.	Remainder of PLU in Leicestershire.
Bakewell PLU	Abney & Abney Grange, Aldwark, Ashford, Bakewell, Baslow & Bubnell, Beeley, Birchover, Blackwell, Bradwell, Brushfield, Calver, Chatsworth, Chelmorton, Cromford, Curbar + detached portion, Darley, Edensor, Elton, Eyam + 3 detached portions, Eyam Woodlands, Flagg + detached portion, Foolow + 10 detached portions, Froggatt, Gratton, Great Hucklow, Great Longstone + detached portion, Great Rowsley + detached portion, Grindlow, Harthill, Hassop, Hathersage, Hazlebadge, Highlow, Ivonbrook Grange, Little Hucklow + detached portion, Little Longstone, Litton, Matlock, Middle Quarter, Middleton & Smerrill, Monyash, Nether Haddon, Nether Padley, Offerton, Outseats + 4 detached portions, Over Haddon, Pilsley, Rowland, Sheldon, Stanton + 2 detached portions, Stoke, Stoney Middleton, Taddington, Tansley, Tideswell + detached portion, Wardlow, Wensley & Snitterton, Wheston + 2 detached portions, Winster, Youlgreave.	
Basford PLU	Codnor Park, Condor & Loscoe + detached portion, Heanor, Ilkeston, Shipley.	Remainder of PLU in Nottinghamshire.
Belper PLU	Alderwasley, Alfreton, Allestree, Ashleyhay, Belper, Crich, Denby, Dethick & Lea, Duffield, Hazlewood, Heage, Holbrook, Horsley, Horsley Woodhouse, Idridgehay & Alton, Kedleston, Kilbourne, Kirk Langley, Mackworth, Mapperley, Markeaton, Morley, Pentrich, Quarndon, Ravensdale Park, Ripley, Shuttle & Postern, Smalley, South Wingfield, Turnditch, Weston Underwood, Windley, Wirksworth.	
Burton upon Trent PLU	Ash, Barton Blount, Bearwardcote, Bretby, Burnaston, Caldwell, Castle Gresley, Catton, Church Broughton, Church Gresley, Coton in the Elms, Dalbury Lees, Drakelow, Egginton, Etwall, Finder, Foremark, Foston & Scropton, Hatton + detached portion, Hilton, Hoon, Incleby, Linton, Lullington, Marston on Dove, Mickleover, Osleston & Thurvaston, Radbourne, Repton, Rosliston + detached portion, Stanton & Newhall, Stapenhill, Sutton on the Hill, Swadlincote, Trusley, Twyford & Stenson, Walton upon Trent, Willington, Winshill.	Remainder of PLU in Staffordshire.
Chapel en le Frith PLU	Aston, Bamford, Brough & Shatton, Buxton, Castleton, Chapel en le Frith, Chinley, Derwent + 2 detached portions, Edale, Fairfield, Fernilee, Hope, Peak Forest, Thornhill, Upper Quarter, Woodlands + detached portion, Wormhill.	
Chesterfield PLU	Ashover, Barlow, Bolsover, Brackenfield, Brampton & Walton, Brimington, Calow, Chesterfield, Claylane, Coal Aston, Dronfield, Eckington, Hasland, Heath, Holmesfield, Killamarsh, Morton, Newbold & Dunston, North Wingfield, Pilsley, Shirland & Higham, Staveley, Stretton, Sutton cum Duckmanton, Tapton, Temple Normanton, Tupton, Unstone, Wessington, Whittington, Wingerworth, Woodthorpe.	
Derby PLU	All Saints Derby + 4 detached portions, Litchurch, Little Chester, St Alkmund Derby, St Michael Derby + detached portion, St Peter Derby, St Werburgh Derby.	
Ecclesall Bierlow PLU	Beauchief, Dore, Norton + detached portion, Totley.	Remainder of PLU in West Riding of Yorkshire.
Glossop PLU	Glossop, Ludworth & Chisworth.	
Hayfield PLU	Hayfield, Mellor, New Mills.	Remainder of PLU in Cheshire.
Mansfield PLU	Ault Hucknall, Blackwell, Glapwell, Pinxton (Derbyshire portion), Pleasley, Scarcliff, South Normanton, Tibshelf, Upper Langwith.	Remainder of PLU in Nottinghamshire.
Rotherham PLU	Beighton.	Remainder of PLU in West Riding of Yorkshire.
Shardlow PLU	Alvaston & Boulton, Aston upon Trent, Barrow upon Trent, Breadsall, Breaston, Chaddesden, Chellaston, Dale Abbey, Derby Hills, Draycott & Church Wilne, Elvaston, Hopwell, Kirk Hallam, Little Eaton, Littleover, Long Eaton, Melbourne, Normanton, Ockbrook, Osmaston, Risley, Sandiacre, Sawley & Wilsthorpe, Shardlow & Great Wilne, Sinfin & Arleston, Sinfin Moor, Spondon, Stanley, Stanton by Bridge, Stanton by Dale, Swarkeston, West Hallam, Weston upon Trent.	Remainder of PLU in Leicestershire & Nottinghamshire.
Tamworth PLU	Croxall (Derbyshire portion), Measham (part).	Remainder of PLU in Staffordshire & Warwickshire.
Uttoxeter PLU	Boyleston, Cubley, Doveridge + detached portion, Marston Montgomery, Norbury & Roston, Somershall Herbert, Sudbury.	Remainder of PLU in Staffordshire.
Worksop PLU	Barlborough, Clowne, Elmton, Whitwell.	Remainder of PLU in Nottinghamshire & West Riding of Yorkshire.

== Devon ==
Link to 1888 map showing Devon PLUs; Link to 1909 map showing Devon - North PLUs; Link to 1909 map showing Devon - South PLUs; Link to 1928 map showing Devon - North PLUs; Link to 1928 map showing Devon - South PLUs

Exeter had a workhouse union dating back to 1697, which was never converted into a poor law union under the 1834 Act.

Name	Civil Parishes	Notes
Axminster PLU	Axminster, Axmouth, Colyton, Combpyne, Dalwood, Kilmington, Membury, Musbury, Rousdon, Seaton & Beer, Shute, Stockland, Uplyme.	Remainder of PLU in Dorset.
Barnstaple PLU	Arlington, Ashford, Atherington, Barnstaple, Berrynarbor, Bishops Tawton, Bittadon, Bratton Fleming, Braunton, Brendon, Challacombe, Combemartin, Countesbury, East Down, Fremington, Georgeham, Goodleigh, Heanton Punchardon, Highbray, Horwood, Ilfracombe, Instow, Kentisbury, Landkey, Loxhore, Lynton, Martinhoe, Marwood, Morthoe, Newton Tracy, Paracombe, Pilton, Sherwell, Stoke Rivers, Swimbridge, Tawstock, Trentishoe, West Down, Westleigh.	
Bideford PLU	Abbotsham, Alwington, Bideford, Buckland Brewer, Bulkworthy, Clovelly, East Putford, Hartland, Landcross, Littleham, Lundy Island, Monkleigh, Newton St Petrock, Northam + detached portion, Parkham, Welcombe, West Putford, Woolfardisworthy.	
Chard PLU	Yarcombe.	Remainder of PLU in Dorset & Somerset.
Crediton PLU	Brushford, Chawleigh, Cheriton Fitzpain, Clannaborough, Coldridge, Colebrook, Crediton, Crediton Bishop, Down St Mary, Eggesford, Hittesleigh, Kennerleigh, Lapford, Morchard Bishop, Newton St Cyres, Nymet Rowland, Nymettracey, Poughill, Puddington, Sandford, Sherwood, Shobrook, Stokeleigh English, Stokeleigh Pomeroy, Thelbridge, Upton Helions, Washfordpyne, Wembworthy, Woolfardisworthy, Zeal Monachorum.	
Dulverton PLU	Morebath.	Remainder of PLU in Somerset.
East Stonehouse PLP	East Stonehouse.	
Exeter PLU	All Hallows Goldsmith Street Exeter, All Hallows on the Walls Exeter, Bedford Circus Exeter, Bradninch Exeter, Cathedral Close Exeter, Exeter Castle, Holy Trinity Exeter, St David Exeter, St Edmund Exeter, St George Exeter, St John Exeter, St Kerrian Exeter, St Lawrence Exeter, St Leonard Exeter, St Martin Exeter, St Mary Arches Exeter, St Mary Major Exeter, St Mary Steps Exeter, St Olave Exeter, St Pancras Exeter, St Paul Exeter, St Petrock Exeter, St Sidwell Exeter, St Stephen Exeter.	
Holsworthy PLU	Abbots Bickington, Ashwater, Black Torrington, Bradford, Bradworthy, Bridgerule East, Clawton, Cookbury, Hallwill, Hollacombe, Holsworthy, Luffincott, Milton Damerel, Pancrasweek, Pyworthy, Sutcombe, Tetcott, Thornbury.	Remainder of PLU in Cornwall.
Honiton PLU	Awliscombe, Branscombe, Broadhembury, Buckerell, Combe Raleigh, Cotleigh, Dunkeswell, Farway, Feniton, Gittisham, Harpford, Honiton, Luppitt, Monkton, Northleigh, Offwell, Ottery St Mary, Payhembury, Plymtree, Salcombe Regis, Sheldon, Sidbury, Sidmouth, Southleigh, Talaton, Upottery, Venn Ottery, Widworthy.	
Kingsbridge PLU	Aveton Gifford, Bigbury, Blackawton, Buckland Tout Saints, Charleton, Chivelstone, Churchstow, Dodbrooke, East Allington, East Portlemouth, Kingsbridge, Kingston, Loddiswell, Malborough, Modbury, Ringmore, Sherford, Slapton, South Hewish, South Milton, South Pool, Stoke Fleming, Stokenham, Thurlestone, West Alvington, Woodleigh.	
Launceston PLU	Broadwood Widger, North Petherwin, Northcott, St Giles on the Heath, Virginstow, Werrington.	Remainder of PLU in Cornwall.
Newton Abbot PLU	Abbots Kerswell, Ashburton, Bickington, Bishopsteignton, Bovey Tracey, Broadhempston, Buckland in the Moor, Chudleigh, Cockington, Coffinswell, Dawlish, East Ogwell, East Teignmouth, Haccombe with Combe, Hennock, Highweek, Ideford, Ilsington, Ipplepen, Kings Kerswell, Kingsteignton, Lustleigh, Manaton, Moreton Hampstead, North Bovey, St Mary's Church, St Nicholas Ringmore, Stokeinteignhead, Teign Grace, Torbryan, Tormoham, Trusham, West Ogwell, West Teignmouth, Widecombe in the Moor, Wolborough, Woodland.	
Okehampton PLU	Ashbury, Beaworthy, Belstone, Bondleigh, Bratton Clovelly, Bridestowe, Broadwoodkelly, Chagford, Drewsteignton, Exbourne, Germansweek, Gidleigh, Hatherleigh, Highampton, Honeychurch, Iddesleigh, Inwardleigh, Jacobstowe, Meeth, Monkokehampton, North Tawton, Northlew, Okehampton, Sampford Courtenay, Sourton, Sourton Common, South Tawton, Spreyton, Throwleigh.	
Plymouth PLU	Charles the Martyr Plymouth, Extra Parochial, St Andrew Plymouth.	
Plympton St Mary PLU	Bickleigh, Brixton, Chelson Meadow, Compton Gifford, Cornwood, Drake's Island, Egg Buckland, Ermington, Extra Parochial + detached portion, Harford, Holbeton, Laira Green, Newton Ferrers, Pennycross, Plympton Maurice, Plympton St Mary, Plymstock, Revelstoke, Shaugh Prior, St Budeaux, Tamerton Foliott, Wembury, Yealmpton.	
South Molton PLU	Bishops Nympton, Burrington, Charles, Cheldon, Chittlehamholt, Chittlehampton, Chulmleigh, Creacombe, East Anstey, East Buckland, East Worlington, Filleigh, George Nympton, Kings Nympton, Knowstone, Mariansleigh, Meshaw, Molland, North Molton, Rackenford, Romansleigh, Rose Ash, Saterleigh, South Molton + detached portion, Twitching, Warkleigh, West Anstey, West Buckland, Witheridge.	Remainder of PLU in Somerset.
St Thomas’ PLU	Alphington, Ashcombe, Ashton, Aylesbeare, Bicton, Bramfordspeke, Bridford, Broad Clyst, Christow, Clyst Honiton, Clyst Hydon, Clyst St George, Clyst St Lawrence, Clyst St Mary, Colaton Raleigh, Doddiscombleigh, Dotton, Dunchidiock, Dunsford, East Budleigh, Exminster, Farrington, Heavitree, Holcombe Burnel, Huxham, Ide, Kenn, Kenton, Littleham, Lympston, Mamhead, Netherexe, Otterton, Pinhoe, Poltimore, Powderham, Rewe, Rockbere, Shillingford, Sowton, St Leonard Exeter (portion known as Larkbear), St Mary Tedburn, St Thomas the Apostle Exeter, Stoke Canon, Topsham, Upton Pyne, Whimple, Whitestone, Withycombe Raleigh, Woodbury.	
Stoke Damerel PLP	Stoke Damerel.	
Taunton PLU	Churchstanton.	Remainder of PLU in Somerset.
Tavistock PLU	Beer Ferris, Bradstone, Brentor, Buckland Monachorum, Coryton, Dunterton, Kelly, Lamerton, Lifton, Lydford, Marystow, Marytavy, Meavy, Milton Abbot, Petertavy, Sampford Spiney, Sheepstor, Stowford, Sydenham Damerel, Tavistock, Thrushelton, Walkhampton, Whitchurch.	Remainder of PLU in Cornwall.
Tiverton PLU	Bampton, Bickleigh, Bradninch, Butterleigh, Cadbury, Cadleigh, Clayhanger, Cruwys Morchard, Cullompton, Halberton, Highleigh, Hockworthy, Huntsham, Kentisbeare, Loxbere, Oakford, Sampford Peverell, Silverton, Stoodley, Templeton, Thorverton, Tiverton, Uffculme, Uplowman, Washfield, Willand.	
Torrington PLU	Alverdiscott, Ash Reigney, Beaford, Buckland Filleigh, Dolton, Dowland, Frithelstock, Great Torrington, High Bickington, Huish, Huntshaw, Langtree, Little Torrington, Merton, Peters Marland, Petrockstow, Roborough, Shebbear, Sheepwash, St Giles in the Woods, Wear Gifford, Winkleigh, Yarnscombe.	
Totnes PLU	Ashrrington, Berry Pomeroy, Brixham, Buckfast Leigh, Churston Ferrers, Cornworthy, Dartington, Dean Prior, Diptford, Dittisham, Halwell, Harberton, Holne, Kingswear + detached portion, Little Hempston, Marldon, Morleigh, North Huish, Paignton, Rattery, South Brent, St Petrox Dartmouth, St Saviours Dartmouth, Staverton, Stoke Gabriel, Totnes, Townstall, Ugborough.	
Wellington PLU	Burlescombe, Clayhidon, Culmstock, Hemyock, Holcombe Rogus.	Remainder of PLU in Somerset.

== Dorset ==
Link to 1888 map showing Dorset PLUs; Link to 1909 map showing Dorset PLUs; Link to 1930 map showing Dorset PLUs

Name	Civil Parishes	Notes
Axminster PLU	Chardstock, Charmouth, Hawkchurch, Lyme Regis, Thorncombe.	Remainder of PLU in Devon.
Beaminster PLU	Beaminster, Bettiscombe, Broadwindsor, Burstock, Chedington, Corscomb, East Chelborough, Evershot, Halstock, Hook, Mapperton, Marshwood, Melbury Osmond, Melbury Sampford, Mosteston, Netherbury, North Poorton, Pilsdon, Powerstock, Rampisham, South Perrott, Stoke Abbott, West Chelborough, Wraxall.	Remainder of PLU in Somerset.
Blandford PLU	Almer, Anderson, Blandford Forum, Blandford St Mary, Bryanston, Charlton Marshall, Durweston, Hilton, Iwerne Courtney, Langton Long Blandford, Milborne St Andrew, Milborne Stileham, Milton Abbas, Pimperne, Spettisbury, Steepleton Iwerne, Stowerpaine, Tarrant Crawford, Tarrant Gunville, Tarrant Hinton, Tarrant Keynston, Tarrant Launceston, Tarrant Monkton, Tarrant Rawston, Tarrant Rushton, Turnworth, Winterborne Clenston, Winterborne Houghton, Winterborne Kingstone, Winterborne Strickland, Winterborne Tomson, Winterborne Whitchurch, Winterborne Zelstone.	
Bridport PLU	Allington, Askerswell, Bothenhampton, Bradpole, Bridport, Burton Bradstock, Chideock, Chilcombe, Litton Cheney + detached portion, Loders, Puncknowle, Shipton George, Stanton St Gabriel, Swyre, Symondsbury, Walditch, Whitchurch Canonicorum, Wootton Fitzpaine.	
Cerne PLU	Alton Pancras, Batcombe, Buckland Newton + detached portion, Cattistock, Cerne Abbas, Cheselbourne, Frome St Quintin, Goodmanstone, Hermitage, Hilfield, Mappowder, Melbury Bubb, Melcombe Horsey, Minterne Magna, Nether Cerne, Piddletrenthide, Pulham, Sydling St Nicholas, Up Cerne, Wootton Glanville.	
Chard PLU	Wambrook.	Remainder of PLU in Devon & Somerset.
Dorchester PLU	All Saints Dorchester, Athelhampton, Bradford Peverell, Broadmayne, Burleston, Charminster, Chilfrome, Dewlish, East Compton, Fordington, Frampton, Frome Vauchurch, Holy Trinity Dorchester + detached portion, Kingston Russell, Little Bredy, Long Bredy, Maiden Newton, Piddlehinton, Puddletown, St Peter Dorchester, Stinsford, Stratton, Tincleton, Toller Fratrum, Toller Porcorum, Tolpuddle, Warmwell, Watercombe, West Compton, West Knighton, West Stafford, Whitcombe, Winterborne Abbas, Winterborne Came, Winterborne Herring Stone, Winterborne Monkton, Winterborne St Martin, Winterborne Steepleton, Woodsford, Wynford Eagle.	
Mere PLU	Bourton, Silton.	Remainder of PLU in Somerset & Wiltshire.
Poole PLU	Canford Magna, Hamworthy, Kinson, Longfleet, Lytchet Minster, Lytchett Matravers, Parkstone, St James Poole.	
Shaftesbury PLU	Ashmore, Cann (or Shaston St Rumbold), Compton Abbas, East Stour, Fontmell Magna, Gillingham, Holy Trinity Shaftesbury, Iwerne Minster, Margaret Marsh, Melbury Abbas, Motcombe, St James Shaftesbury, St Peter Shaftesbury, Stour Provost, Sutton Waldron, Todber, West Stour.	
Sherborne PLU	Beer Hackett, Bishop's Caundle, Bradford Abbas, Castleton, Caundle Marsh, Chetnole, Clifton Maybank, Folke, Haydon, Holnest, Holwell, Leigh, Leweston, Lillington, Long Burton, Nether Compton, North Wootton, Osborne, Over Compton, Purse Caundle, Ryme Intrinseca, Sherborne, Stockwood, Thornford, Yetminster.	Remainder of PLU in Somerset.
Sturminster PLU	Child Okeford, Fifehead Magdalen, Fifehead Neville, Hammoon, Hanford, Haselbury Bryan, Hinton St Mary, Ibberton, Lydlinch, Manston, Marnhull, Okeford Fitzpaine (includes Belchalwell), Shillingstone, Stalbridge, Stoke Wake, Stourton Caundle, Sturminster Newton, Woolland.	
Wareham & Purbeck PLU	Affpuddle, Arne, Bere Regis, Bloxworth, Chaldon Herring, Church Knowle, Coombe Keynes, Corfe Castle, East Holme, East Lulworth, East Stoke, Holy Trinity Wareham, Kimmeridge, Lady St Mary Wareham, Langton Matravers, Morden, Moreton, St Martin Wareham, Steeple, Studland, Swanage, Turners Puddle, Tyneham, West Lulworth, Winfrith Newburgh, Wool, Worth Matravers.	
Weymouth PLU	Abbotsbury, Bincombe, Broadway, Buckland Ripers, Chickerell, Fleet, Langton Herring, Melcomb Regis, Osmington, Ower Moigne, Portisham, Portland, Poxwell, Preston, Radipole, Upway, Wyke Regis.	
Wimborne & Cranborne PLU	Chalbury, Chettle, Corfe Mullen, Cranborne, East Woodyates + detached portion, Edmondsham, Farnham, Gussage All Saints, Gussage St Michael, Hampreston, Handley, Hinton Martell, Hinton Parva, Holt Heath, Horton, Long Crichel, Moor Crichel, Pentridge + detached portion, Shapwick, Sturminster Marshall, West Parley, West Woodyates, Wimborne Minster, Wimborne St Giles, Witchampton, Woodlands.	
Wincanton PLU	Buckhorn Weston, Kington Magna.	Remainder of PLU in Somerset.

== County Durham ==
Link to 1888 map showing County Durham PLUs; Link to 1909 map showing County Durham PLUs; Link to 1930 map showing County Durham PLUs

Name	Civil Parishes	Notes
Auckland PLU	Barony & Evenwood, Binchester, Bishop Auckland & Polland's Lands, Bolam, Byers Green, Coundon, Coundon Grange, Crook & Billy Row, East Thickley, Eldon, Escomb, Hamsterley, Helmington Row, Hunwick & Helmington, Lands common to Hamsterley, Lynesack & Softley and South Bedburn + 4 detached portions, Lynesack & Softley, Merrington, Middlestone, Middridge, Middridge Grange, Newfield, Newton Cap, North Bedburn, Old Park, Shildon, South Bedburn, St Andrew Auckland, St Helen Auckland, West Auckland, Westerton, Whitworth, Windlestone, Witton-le-Wear.	
Chester-le-Street PLU	Barmston, Birtley, Bourn Moor, Chester-le-Street, Cocken, Edmondsley, Great Lumley, Harraton, Lambton, Lamesley, Little Lumley, Ouston, Pelton, Plawsworth, South Biddick, Urpeth, Usworth, Waldridge, Washington, Witton Gilbert.	
Darlington PLU	Archdeacon Newton, Barmpton, Blackwell, Brafferton, Coatham-Mundeville, Cockerton, Darlington + detached portion, Denton, Great Aycliffe, Great Burdon, Haughton le Skerne, Heighington, High Coniscliffe, Houghton-le-Side, Hurworth, Killerby, Low Coniscliffe, Low Dinsdale, Middleton St George, Morton Palms, Neasham, Piercebridge, Redworth, Sadberge, School Aycliffe, Sockburn, Summerhouse, Walworth, Whessoe.	Remainder of PLU in North Riding of Yorkshire.
Durham PLU	Brancepeth, Brandon & Byshottles, Broom, Cassop cum Quarrington, Coxhoe, Elvet + detached portion, Framwellgate, Hett, Kimblesworth, Pittington, Shadforth, Sherburn, Sherburn House, Shincliffe, St Giles Durham, St Mary Magdalene Durham, St Mary the Less Durham, St Mary-le-Bow Durham, St Nicholas Durham, Stockley, Sunderland Bridge, The Castle & Precincts Durham, The College Durham, Tudhoe, Whitwell House, Willington.	
Easington PLU	Burdon, Castle Eden, Cold Hesleden, Dalton le Dale, Dawden, Easington with Thorpe, East Murton, Haswell, Hawthorn, Hutton Henry, Kelloe, Monk Hesleden, Nesbitt, Seaham, Seaton with Slingley, Sheraton with Hulam, Shotton, Thornley, Wingate.	
Gateshead PLU	Chopwell, Crawcrook, Gateshead, Heworth, Ryton, Ryton Woodside, Stella, Whickham, Winlaton.	
Hartlepool PLU	Brearton, Claxton, Dalton Piercy, Elwick, Elwick Hall, Greatham, Hart, Hartlepool, Seaton Carew, Stranton, Thorpe Bulmer, Throston.	
Houghton-le-Spring PLU	East & Middle Herrington, East Rainton, Great Eppleton, Hetton-le-Hole, Houghton-le-Spring, Little Eppleton, Moor House, Moorsley, Morton Grange, Newbottle, Offerton, Painshaw, Silksworth, Warden Law, West Herrington, West Rainton.	
Lanchester PLU	Benfieldside, Collierley, Conside & Knitsley, Cornsay, Ebchester, Esh, Greencroft, Healeyfield, Hedleyhope, Iveston, Kyo, Lanchester, Lands common to Lanchester and Satley + detached portion, Langley, Medomsley, Muggleswick, Satley, Tanfield.	
Sedgefield PLU	Bishop Middleham, Bishopton, Bradbury & the Isle, Butterwick & Oldacres, Chilton, Cornforth, East & West Newbiggin, Elstob, Embleton, Ferryhill, Fishburn, Foxton & Shotton, Garmondsway Moor, Little Stainton, Mainsforth, Mordon, Preston le Skerne, Sedgefield, Stainton le Street, Stillington, Thrislington, Trimdon, Woodham.	
South Shields PLU	Boldon, Harton, Hedworth Monkton & Jarrow + detached portion, South Shields, Westoe, Whitburn.	
Stockton PLU	Aislaby, Billingham, Carlton, Cowpon, East Hartburn, Egglescliffe, Elton, Grindon, Long Newton, Newsham, Newton Bewley, Norton, Preston upon Tees, Redmarshall, Stockton upon Tees, Whitton, Wolviston.	
Sunderland PLU	Bishop Wearmouth, Bishop Wearmouth Panns, Ford, Fulwell, Hylton, Monk Wearmouth, Monk Wearmouth Shore, Ryhope, Southwick, Sunderland, Tunstall.	
Teesdale PLU	Barnard Castle, Cleatlam, Cockfield, Eggleston, Forest & Frith, Gainford, Headlam, Hilton, Ingleton, Langleydale with Shotton, Langton, Middleton in Teesdale, Morton Tinmouth, Newbiggin, Raby with Keverstone, Staindrop, Streatlam & Stainton, Wackerfield, Westwick, Whorlton, Winston, Woodland.	Remainder of PLU in North Riding of Yorkshire.
Weardale PLU	Edmondbyers, Hunstonworth, Stanhope, Undivided Moor common to Stanhope and Wolsingham, Wolsingham.	

== Essex ==
Link to 1888 map showing Essex PLUs; Link to 1909 map showing Essex PLUs; Link to 1927 map showing Essex PLUs

Name	Civil Parishes	Notes
Billericay PLU	Basildon, Bowers Gifford, Brentwood, Childerditch, Downham, Dunton, East Horndon, Great Burstead, Hutton, Ingrave, Laindon, Lee Chapel, Little Burstead, Little Warley, Mountnessing, Nevendon, North Benfleet, Pitsea, Ramsden Bellhouse, Ramsden Crays, Shenfield, South Weald, Vange, West Horndon, Wickford.	
Bishop's Stortford PLU	Berden, Birchanger, Elsenham, Farnham, Great Hallingbury, Henham, Little Hallingbury, Manuden, Stansted Mountfitchet, Ugley.	Remainder of PLU in Hertfordshire.
Braintree PLU	Black Notley, Bocking, Bradwell, Braintree, Cressing, Fairsted, Faulkbourn + 2 detached portions, Feering, Finchingfield, Great Coggeshall, Great Saling, Hatfield Peverel, Kelvedon, Little Coggeshall, Markshall, Panfield, Pattiswick, Rayne, Rivenhall, Shalford, Stisted, Terling, Wethersfield, White Notley, Witham + detached portion.	
Chelmsford PLU	Boreham, Broomfield, Buttsbury, Chelmsford + 2 detached portions, Chignall, Danbury, East Hanningfield, Good Easter, Great Baddow, Great Leighs, Great Waltham, Ingatestone & Fryerning, Little Baddow, Little Leighs, Little Waltham, Margaretting, Mashbury, Pleshey, Rettendon, Roxwell, Runwell, Sandon, South Hanningfield, Springfield, Stock, West Hanningfield, Widford + detached portion, Woodham Ferrers, Writtle.	
Colchester PLU	All Saints Colchester + detached portion, Berechurch, Greenstead, Holy Trinity Colchester + 7 detached portions, Lexden + detached portion, St Botolph Colchester + 8 detached portions, St Giles Colchester + detached portion, St James Colchester + 2 detached portions, St Leonard Colchester, St Martin Colchester, St Mary at the Walls Colchester, St Mary Magdalen Colchester + detached portion, St Michael Mile End, St Nicholas Colchester, St Peter Colchester, St Runwald Colchester + 3 detached portions.	
Dunmow PLU	Aythorpe Roding, Bardfield Saling, Barnston, Broxted, Chickney, Felsted, Great Bardfield, Great Canfield, Great Dunmow, Great Easton, Hatfield Broad Oak, High Easter, High Roding, Leaden Roding, Lindsell, Little Bardfield, Little Canfield, Little Dunmow, Little Easton, Margaret Roding, Stebbing, Takeley, Thaxted, Tilty, White Roding.	
Edmonton PLU	Waltham Abbey.	Remainder of PLU in Hertfordshire & Middlesex.
Epping PLU	Chigwell, Chingford, Epping, Great Parndon, Harlow, Latton, Little Parndon + detached portion, Loughton, Magdalen Laver + 2 detached portions, Matching, Nazeing, Netteswell, North Weald Basett, Roydon, Sheering, Theydon Bois, Theydon Garnon.	
Halstead PLU	Castle Hedingham, Colne Engaine, Earls Colne, Gosfield, Great Maplestead, Great Yeldham, Halstead, Little Maplestead, Little Yeldham, Pebmarsh, Ridgewell, Sible Hedingham, Stambourne, Tilbury Juxta Clare, Toppesfield, White Colne.	
Lexden & Winstree PLU	Abberton, Aldham, Birch, Boxted, Chapel, Copford, Dedham, East Donyland, East Mersea, Easthorpe, Fingringhoe, Fordham, Great Horkesley, Great Tey, Great Wigborough, Inworth + detached portion, Langenhoe, Langham, Layer Breton, Layer de la Haye, Layer Marney, Little Horkesley, Little Tey, Little Wigborough, Marks Tey, Messing, Mount Bures, Peldon, Salcott, Stanway, Virley, Wakes Colne, West Bergholt, West Mersea, Wivenhoe, Wormingford.	
Linton PLU	Bartlow End + 2 detached portions, Hadstock.	Remainder of PLU in Cambridgeshire.
Maldon PLU	All Saints Maldon, Althorne, Asheldham, Bradwell Juxta Mare, Burnham, Cold Norton, Creeksea, Dengie, Goldhanger, Great Braxted, Great Totham + detached portion, Hazeleigh, Heybridge, Langford, Latchingdon, Little Braxted, Little Totham, Mayland, Mundon, North Fambridge, Purleigh, South Minster, St Lawrence, St Mary Maldon, St Peter Maldon, Steeple, Stow Maries, Tillingham, Tollesbury, Tolleshunt D’Arcy, Tolleshunt Knights, Tolleshunt Major, Ulting, Wickham Bishop, Woodham Mortimer, Woodham Walter.	
Ongar PLU	Abbess Roding + detached portion, Beauchamp Roding, Berners Roding, Blackmore, Chipping Ongar, Doddinghurst, Fyfield, Greensted, High Laver, High Ongar + 2 detached portions, Kelvedon Hatch, Lambourne, Little Laver, Moreton + detached portion, Navestock, Norton Mandeville, Shelley, Shellow Bowells, Stanford Rivers, Stapleford Abbotts, Stapleford Tawney, Stondon Massey, Theydon Mount, Willingale Doe + detached portion, Willingale Spain + detached portion.	
Orsett PLU	Aveley, Bulphan, Chadwell, Corringham, East Tilbury, Fobbing, Grays Thurrock, Horndon on the Hill, Laindon Hills, Little Thurrock, Mucking, North Ockendon, Orsett, South Ockendon, Stanford le Hope, Stifford, West Thurrock, West Tilbury.	
Risbridge PLU	Ashen, Birdbrook, Haverhill (Essex portion), Helion Bumpstead, Kedington (Essex portion), Ovington, Steeple Bumpstead, Sturmer.	Remainder of PLU in Suffolk.
Rochford PLU	Ashingdon + detached portion, Barling, Canewdon + 3 detached portions, Canvey Island, Eastwood + detached portion, Foulness, Great Stambridge + detached portion, Great Wakering + 2 detached portions, Hadleigh, Havengore, Hawkwell, Hockley + detached portion, Leigh, Little Stambridge + detached portion, Little Wakering, North Shoebury, Paglesham, Prittlewell, Rawreth, Rayleigh, Rochford, Shopland, South Benfleet, South Fambridge, South Shoebury, Southchurch, Sutton, Thundersley.	
Romford PLU	Barking, Cranham, Dagenham, Great Warley, Havering atte Bower, Hornchurch, Rainham, Romford, Upminster, Wennington.	
Royston PLU	Great Chishall, Heydon, Little Chishall.	Remainder of PLU in Cambridgeshire & Hertfordshire.
Saffron Walden PLU	Arkesden, Ashdon, Chrishall + detached portion, Clavering, Debden, Elmdon, Great Chesterford, Great Samford, Hempstead, Langley, Little Chesterford, Little Sampford, Littlebury, Newport + detached portion, Quendon, Radwinter, Rickling, Saffron Walden, Strethall, Wenden Lofts, Wenders Ambo, Wicken Bonhurt, Widdington + 5 detached portions, Wimbish.	
Sudbury PLU	Alphamstone, Ballingdon cum Brundon, Belchamp Otton, Belchamp St Pauls, Belchamp Walter, Borley, Bulmer + detached portion, Bures, Foxearth, Gestingthorpe, Great Henny, Lamarsh, Liston, Little Henny, Middleton, Northwood + detached portion, Pentlow, Twinstead, Wickham St Pauls.	Remainder of PLU in Suffolk.
Tendring PLU	Alresford, Ardleigh, Beaumont cum Moze, Bradfield, Brightlingsea, Dovercourt, Elmstead, Great Bentley, Great Bromley, Great Clacton, Great Holland, Great Oakley, Kirby le Soken, Lawford, Little Bromley, Little Clacton, Little Holland, Little Oakley, Little Bentley, Manningtree, Mistley, Ramsey, St Nicholas Harwich, St Osyth, Tendring, Thorpe le Soken, Thorrington, Walton le Soken, Weeley, Wix, Wrabness.	
West Ham PLU	East Ham, Leyton, Little Ilford, Walthamstow, Wanstead, West Ham, Woodford.	

== Gloucestershire ==
Link to 1888 map showing Gloucestershire PLUs; Link to 1909 map showing Gloucestershire PLUs; Link to 1928 map showing Gloucestershire PLUs

Name	Civil Parishes	Notes
Barton Regis PLU	Clifton, Filton, Henbury, Horfield, Shirehampton, St George, St James & St Paul Bristol, St Philip & Jacob Without Bristol, Stapleton, Stoke Gifford, Westbury upon Trym, Winterbourne + detached portion.	Originally called Clifton until 1877.
Bedminster PLU	Bedminster (Gloucestershire portion).	Remainder of PLU in Somerset.
Bristol PLU	All Saints Bristol, Castle Precincts Bristol, Christchurch Bristol, St Augustine Bristol, St Ewen Bristol, St James Bristol, St John the Baptist Bristol, St Leonard Bristol, St Mary le Port Bristol, St Mary Redcliff Bristol, St Michael Bristol, St Nicholas Bristol, St Paul Bristol, St Peter Bristol, St Philip & Jacob Within Bristol, St Stephen Bristol, St Thomas Bristol, Temple Bristol.	
Cheltenham PLU	Badgeworth, Charlton Kings, Cheltenham, Coberley, Cowley, Great Shurdington, Great Witcombe, Leckhampton, Prestbury, Staverton, Swindon, Uckington, Up Hatherley.	
Chepstow PLU	Alvington, Aylburton, Hewelsfield, Lancaut, Lydney, St Briavels, Tidenham, Woolaston.	Remainder of PLU in Monmouthshire, Wales.
Chipping Sodbury PLU	Acton Turville, Alqerley, Chipping Sodbury, Cold Ashton, Dirham & Hinton, Dodington, Doynton, Frampton Cotterell, Great Badminton, Hawkesbury, Horton, Iron Acton, Little Sodbury, Marshfield, Old Sodbury, Pucklechurch, Tormarton, Wapley & Codrington, West Littleton, Westerleigh, Wick & Abson, Wickwar, Yate.	
Cirencester PLU	Ampney Crucis + 3 detached portions, Ampney St Mary + detached portion, Ampney St Peter, Bagendon, Barnsley, Baunton, Brimpsfield, Cirencester, Coates, Colesborne, Daglingworth, Down Ampney, Driffield, Duntisborne Abbotts, Duntisborne Rouse, Edgeworth, Elkstone, Fairford, Harnehill, Hatherop, Kempsford, Meysey Hampton, North Cerney, Poulton, Quenington, Rendcomb, Rodmarton, Sapperton, Siddington, Side, South Cerney, Stratton, Winstone.	Remainder of PLU in Wiltshire.
Dursley PLU	Cam, Coaley, Dursley, Kingswood, North Nibley, Nympsfield, Owlpen, Slimbridge, Stinchcombe, Uley, Wotton under Edge + detached portion.	
Evesham PLU	Ashton under Hill, Aston Somerville, Aston Subedge, Childs Wickham, Cow Honeybourne, Hinton on the Green, Pedworth, Saintbury, Weston Subedge, Willersey.	Remainder of PLU in Worcestershire.
Faringdon PLU	Lechlade.	Remainder of PLU in Berkshire & Oxfordshire.
Gloucester PLU	Ashleworth, Barnwood, Barton St Mary Gloucester, Brockworth, Churchdown, Down Hatherley, Elmore, Hempsted, Highnam Over & Linton, Holy Trinity Gloucester, Hucclecote, Lassington, Littleworth Gloucester, Longford, Maisemore, Matson, Norton, Pool Meadow Gloucester, Prinknash Park, Quedgeley, Sandhurst, South Hamlet Gloucester, St Aldgate Gloucester, St Catherine's Gloucester, St John the Baptist Gloucester, St Mary de Crypt Gloucester, St Mary de Grace Gloucester, St Mary de Lode Gloucester, St Michael Gloucester, St Nicholas Gloucester, St Owen Gloucester, Tuffley, Twigworth, Upton St Leonard, Whaddon, Wotton St Mary Gloucester, Wotton St Mary Without Gloucester.	
Keynsham PLU	Bitton, Hanham, Mangotsfield, Oldland, Siston.	Remainder of PLU in Somerset.
Monmouth PLU	West Dean, English Bicknor, Staunton, Newland + 3 detached portions.	Remainder of PLU in Herefordshire, England & Monmouthshire, Wales.
Newent PLU	Bromsberrow, Corse, Dymock, Hartpury, Highleadon, Kempley, Newent, Oxenhall, Pauntley, Preston, Rudford, Taynton, Tibberton, Upleadon.	Remainder of PLU in Herefordshire & Worcestershire.
Northleach PLU	Aldsworth, Aston Blank, Bibury, Chedworth, Coln Rogers, Coln St Aldwyn + detached portion, Coln St Dennis, Compton Abdale, Dowdeswell, Eastington, Eastleach Martin, Eastleach Turville, Farmington, Hampnett, Hazleton, Little Barrington, Northleach, Salperton, Sevenhampton, Sherborne, Shipton, Southrop, Stowell, Turkdean, Whittington, Windrush, Winson, Withington, Yanworth.	
Ross PLU	Ruardean.	Remainder of PLU in Herefordshire.
Shipston on Stour PLU	Admington, Batsford, Bourton on the Hill, Chipping Campden, Clopton, Ebrington, Hidcote Bartrim, Ilmington (Gloucestershire portion), Lower Lemington, Mickleton, Moreton in the Marsh, Quinton, Todenham.	Remainder of PLU in Warwickshire & Worcestershire.
Stow on the Wold PLU	Adlestrop, Bledington, Bourton on the Water, Broadwell, Church Iccomb, Clapton, Condicote, Donnington, Eyford, Great Barrington, Great Rissington, Iccomb, Little Rissington, Longborough, Lower Slaughter, Lower Swell, Maugersbury, Naunton, Notgrove, Oddington, Sezincote, Stow on the Wold, Upper Slaughter, Upper Swell, Westcote, Wyck Rissington.	Remainder of PLU in Worcestershire.
Stratford on Avon PLU	Clifford Chambers, Dorsington, Long Marston, Preston upon Stour, Welford (Gloucestershire portion), Weston upon Avon (Gloucestershire portion).	Remainder of PLU in Warwickshire & Worcestershire.
Stroud PLU	Avening + detached portion, Bisley, Cranham, Edgeworth (detached portion), Horsley, King's Stanley, Leonard Stanley, Minchinhampton, Miserden, Painswick, Pitchcomb, Randwick + detached portion, Stonehouse, Stroud + detached portion, Woodchester.	
Tetbury PLU	Beverstone, Boxwell with Leighterton, Cherrington, Didmarton, Kingscote, Newington Bagpath, Ozleworth, Shipton Moyne, Tetbury, Westonbirt.	Remainder of PLU in Wiltshire.
Tewkesbury PLU	Ashchurch, Boddington, Deerhurst, Elmstone Hardwicke, Forthampton, Hasfield, Kemerton, Leigh, Oxenton, Stoke Orchard, Tewkesbury, Tirley, Tredington, Twyning, Walton Cardiff, Woolstone.	Remainder of PLU in Worcestershire.
Thornbury PLU	Alkington, Almondsbury, Alveston, Aust, Berkeley, Breadstone, Charfield, Cromhall, Elberton, Ham & Stone, Hamfallow, Hill, Hinton, Littleton, Olveston, Rangeworthy, Redwick & Northwick, Rockhampton, Thornbury, Tortworth, Tytherington.	
Westbury upon Severn PLU	Abinghall, Awre, Blaisdon, Bulley, Churcham, East Dean, Flaxley, Huntley, Little Dean, Longhope, Minsterworth, Mitcheldean, Newnham, Westbury upon Severn.	
Wheatenhurst PLU	Arlingham, Brookthorpe, Eastington, Framfton upon Severn, Fretherne with Saul, Frocester, Hardwicke, Harescombe, Haresfield, Longney, Moreton Valence, Standish, Wheatenhurst.	
Winchcomb PLU	Alderton, Alstone, Beckford, Bishops Cleeve, Buckland, Charlton Abbots, Digbrook, Dumbleton, Gotherington, Great Washbourne, Guiting Power, Hailes, Hawling, Little Washborn, Pinnock & Hyde, Prescott, Roel, Snowshill, Southam & Brockhampton, Stanley Pontlarge, Stanton, Stanway, Sudeley Manor, Temple Guiting, Toddington, Winchcomb, Woodmancote, Wormington.	Remainder of PLU in Worcestershire.

== Hampshire ==
Link to 1888 map showing Hampshire PLUs; Link to 1907 map showing Hampshire PLUs; Link to 1927 map showing Hampshire PLUs

Name	Civil Parishes	Notes
Alresford PLU	Beauworth, Bighton, Bishops Sutton, Bramdean, Brown Candover, Cheriton, Chilton Candover, Godsfield, Hinton Ampner, Itchen Stoke, Kilmestone + detached portion, New Alresford, Northington + detached portion, Old Alresford, Ovington, Ropley, Swarraton, Tichborne + 2 detached portions, West Tisted.	
Alton PLU	Alton, Bentley, Bentworth, Binsted, Chawton, Coldrey, East Tisted, East Worldham, Faringdon, Froyle, Hartley Mauditt, Holybourne, Kingsley, Lasham, Medsted, Neatham, Newton Valence, Selborne, Shalden, West Worldham, Wield.	
Alverstoke PLP	Alverstoke.	
Andover PLU	Abbotts Ann, Amport, Andover, Appleshaw, Barton Stacey, Bullington, Chilbolton, Faccombe, Foxcott + detached portion, Fyfield, Goodworth Clatford, Grately, Hurstbourne Tarrant + 2 detached portions, Kimpton, Linkenholt, Long Parish, Monxton, Penton Mewsey, Quarley, Shipton Bellinger, South Tidworth, Tangley, Thruxton + detached portion, Upper Clatford, Vernham's Dean + 2 detached portions, Weyhill + detached portion, Wherwell + detached portion.	
Basingstoke PLU	Andwell, Basing, Basingstoke, Bradley, Bramley, Burnt Common, Church Oakley, Cliddesden + detached portion, Deane, Dummer with Kempshot, Easto + 2 detached portions, Ellisfield, Farleigh Wallop, Hartley Wespall + 2 detached portions, Herriard, Maplederwell, Monk Sherborne + 2 detached portions, Mortimer West End, Nately Scures, Newnham, North Waltham, Nutley, Pamber, Popham, Preston Candover, Sherborne St John, Sherfield upon Loddon, Silchester, Steventon, Stratfield Saye, Stratfield Turgis, Tunworth, Up Nately, Upton Grey, Weston Corbett, Weston Patrick, Winslade, Woodmancott, Wootton St Lawrence, Worting.	
Catherington PLU	Blendworth, Catherington, Charlton, Clanfield, Idsworth, Waterloo.	
Christchurch PLU	Christchurch, Holdenhurst, Sopley.	
Droxford PLU	Bishops Waltham, Corhampton, Droxford, Durley, Exton, Hambleton, Meonstoke, Soberton, Upham, Warnford, West Meon.	
Fareham PLU	Boarhunt, Fareham, Porchester + 2 detached islands, Rowner, Southwick, Titchfield, Wickham, Widely, Wymering + detached island.	
Farnham PLU	Aldershot, Dockenfield.	Remainder of PLU in Surrey.
Fordingbridge PLU	Ashley Walk, Breamore + 2 detached portions, Fordingbridge, Hale, North Charford, Rockbourne, South Charford, Woodgreen.	Remainder of PLU in Wiltshire.
Hartley Wintney PLU	Bramshill, Cove, Crondall, Dogmersfield, Elvetham, Eversley, Farnborough, Greywell, Hartley Wintney, Hawley with Minley, Heckfield, Long Sutton, Mattingley + detached portion, Odiham, Rotherwick, South Warnborough, Winchfield, Yately.	
Havant PLU	Bedhampton, Farlington, Havant, North Hayling, South Hayling, Warblington.	
Hungerford PLU	Combe.	Remainder of PLU in Berkshire & Wiltshire.
Hursley PLU	Farley Chamberlyne, Hursley, North Baddesley, Otterbourne.	
Isle of Wight PLU	Arreton, Binstead, Bonchurch, Brading, Brixton + detached portion, Brook, Calbourne, Carisbrook + 3 detached portions, Chale, Freshwater, Gatcombe, Godshill, Kingston, Mottistone, Newchurch, Newport, Niton, Northwood, Ryde, Shalfleet + detached portion, Shanklin, Shorwell + 2 detached portions, St Helen's, St Lawrence, St Nicholas + 8 detached portions, Thorley, Ventnor, Whippingham, Whitwell, Wootton + 3 detached portions, Yarmouth, Yaverland.	
Kingsclere PLU	Ashmansworth, Baughurst + 2 detached portions, Burghclere + detached portion, Crux Easton, East Woodhay, Ecchinswell, Ewhurst, Hannington + 4 detached portions, Highclere, Kingsclere + 3 detached portions, Litchfield, Sydmonton, Tadley + 2 detached portions, Wolverton + 3 detached portions, Woodcott.	
Lymington PLU	Boldre, Brockenhurst, Hordle, Lymington, Milford, Milton, Rhinefield, Sway.	
New Forest PLU	Beaulieu, Bramshaw, Denny Lodge, Dibden, Eling, Exbury, Fawley + detached portion, Lyndhurst, Minstead.	Remainder of PLU in Wiltshire.
New Winchester PLU	Avington + 2 detached portions, Bishopstoke, Chilcomb + detached portion, College Precincts Winchester, Compton, Crawley, East Stratton, Easton + detached portion, Headbourne Worthy, Hunton, Itchen Abbas + 4 detached portions, Kings Worthy + detached portion, Lainston, Littleton, Martyr Worthy, Milland + detached portion, Mitcheldever, Morestead, Owslebury, Sparsholt, St Bartholomew Hyde, St Faith Winchester, St John Winchester, St Lawrence Winchester, St Mary Kalendar Winchester, St Maurice Winchester, St Michael Winchester, St Peter Cheesehill Winchester, St Peter Colebrook Winchester, St Swithin Winchester, St Thomas Winchester, Stoke Charity, Twyford, Weeke, Winnall, Wonston.	
Newbury PLU	Newtown.	Remainder of PLU in Berkshire.
Petersfield PLU	Bramshot (Hampshire portion), Buriton, Colemore, East Meon, Empshott, Froxfield, Greatham, Hawkley, Lyss, Petersfield, Priors Dean, Privett, Sheet, Steep.	Remainder of PLU in Sussex.
Portsea Island PLU	Great Salterns, Portsea + detached island, Portsmouth + detached portion.	
Ringwood PLU	Broomy, Burley, Ellingham + detached portion, Harbridge, Ibsley, Ringwood.	
Romsey PLU	Dunwood, East Dean, East Wellow, Lockerley, Michelmersh + 3 detached portions, Mottisfont, Nursling, Romsey Extra, Romsey Infra, Sherfield English, Timsbury + detached portion.	Remainder of PLU in Wiltshire.
South Stoneham PLU	Botley, Bursledon, Chilworth, Hamble le Rice, Hound + 2 detached portions, Millbrook, North Stoneham, South Stoneham, St Mary Extra Southampton.	
Southampton PLU	All Saints Southampton, Holy Rood Southampton, St John Southampton, St Lawrence Southampton, St Mary Southampton, St Michael Southampton.	
Stockbridge PLU	Ashley, Bossington, Broughton, Buckholt, East Tytherley, Frenchmoor, Houghton, Kings Somborne, Leckford, Little Somborne, Longstock, Nether Wallop, Over Wallop, Stockbridge, Upper Edon, West Tytherley.	
Whitchurch PLU	Ashe, Freefolk, Hurstbourne Priors, Laverstoke, Overton, St Mary Bourne, Tufton, Whitchurch.	

== Herefordshire ==
Link to 1888 map showing Herefordshire PLUs; Link to 1909 map showing Herefordshire PLUs; Link to 1924 map showing Herefordshire PLUs

Name	Civil Parishes	Notes
Abergavenny PLU	Fwthog.	Remainder of PLU in Monmouthshire, Wales.
Bromyard PLU	Avenbury, Bishops Frome, Bredenbury, Bromyard, Collington, Cradley, Edvin Ralph, Evesbatch, Felton, Grendon Bishop, Grendon Warren, Hampton Charles, Linton, Little Cowarne, Lower Brockhampton, Moreton Jeffreys, Much Cowarne, Norton with Brockhampton, Ocle Pychard, Pencombe, Saltmarshe, Stanford Bishop, Stoke Lacy, Tedstone Delamere, Tedstone Wafer, Thornbury, Ullingswick, Upper Sapey, Wacton, Whitbourne, Winslow, Wolferlow.	Remainder of PLU in Worcestershire.
Dore PLU	Abbey Dore, Bacton, Craswall, Dulas, Ewyas Harold, Kenderchurch, Kentchurch, Kilpeck, Kingstone, Llancillo, Llanveynoe, Longtown, Madley, Michaelchurch Escley, Orcop, Peterchurch, Rowlstone, St Devereux, St Margaret, Thruxton, Treville, Turnastone, Tyberton, Vowchurch, Walterstone, Wormbridge.	Remainder of PLU in Monmouthshire, Wales.
Hay PLU	Bredwardine, Clifford, Cusop, Dorstone, Whitney.	Remainder of PLU in Breconshire & Radnorshire, Wales.
Hereford PLU	Aconbury, All Saints Hereford, Allensmore, Bartestree, Bolstone, Breinton, Burghill, Callow, Clehonger, Credenhill, Dewsall, Dinedor, Dinmore, Dormington, Eaton Bishop, Fownhope, Grafton, Hampton Bishop, Haywood, Holme Lacy, Holmer, Holmer Within Hereford, Huntington, Kenchester, Little Birch, Little Dewchurch, Lower Bullingham, Lugwardine, Marden, Mordiford, Moreton on Lugg, Much Birch, Much Dewchurch, Pipe & Lyde, Preston Wynne, St Martin Hereford, St John the Baptist Hereford, St Nicholas Hereford, St Owen Hereford, St Peter Hereford, Stoke Edith, Stretton Sugwas, Sutton, The Vineyard Hereford, Tupsley, Wellington, Westhide, Weston Beggard, Withington.	
Kington PLU	Brilley, Byton, Coombe, Eardisley, Huntington, Kington, Kinsham, Knill, Lingen, Lower Harpton, Lyonshall, Pembridge, Rood, Nash & Little Brampton, Stapleton, Staunton on Arrow, Titley, Willersley, Willey, Winforton.	Remainder of PLU in Radnorshire, Wales.
Knighton PLU	Adforton, Brampton Bryan, Buckton & Coxall, Walford Letton & Newton.	Remainder of PLU in Shropshire, England & Radnorshire, Wales.
Ledbury PLU	Ashperton, Aylton, Bosbury, Canon Frome, Castle Frome, Coddington, Colwall, Donnington, Eastnor, Egleton, Ledbury, Little Marcle, Much Marcle, Munsley, Pixley, Putley, Stretton Grandison, Tarrington, Woolhope, Yarkhill.	Remainder of PLU in Worcestershire.
Leominster PLU	Aymestrey, Bodenham, Croft, Docklow + detached portion, Eye, Moreton & Ashton, Eyton, Ford, Hampton Wafer, Hatfield, Hope under Dinmore, Humber + 4 detached portions, Kimbolton, Kingsland, Laysters, Leominster Borough, Leominster Out, Lucton, Luston, Middleton on the Hill, Monkland, New Hampton, Newton, Orleton, Pudleston, Shobdon, Stoke Prior + 11 detached portions, Yarpole.	
Ludlow PLU	Aston, Burrington, Downton, Elton, Leinthall Starkes, Leintwardine North (Herefordshire portion), Ludford (Herefordshire portion), Richard's Castle (Herefordshire portion), Wigmore.	Remainder of PLU in Shropshire.
Monmouth PLU	Gannerew, Garway, Llanrothal, Welsh Bicknor, Welsh Newton, Withchurch.	Remainder of PLU in Gloucestershire, England & Monmouthshire, Wales.
Newent PLU	Aston Ingham, Linton.	Remainder of PLU in Gloucestershire & Worcestershire.
Ross PLU	Ballingham, Brampton Abbotts, Bridstow, Brockhampton, Foy, Goodrich, Harewood, Hentland, Hope Mansel, How Caple, King's Caple, Lea, Llandinabo, Llangarren, Llanwarne, Marston, Pencoyd, Peterstow, Ross, Sellack, Sollers Hope, St Weonards, Tretire with Michaelchurch, Upton Bishop, Walford, Weston under Penyard, Yatton.	Remainder of PLU in Gloucestershire.
Tenbury PLU	Brimfield, Little Hereford, Stoke Bliss + detached portion.	Remainder of PLU in Shropshire & Worcestershire.
Weobley PLU	Almeley, Barnesfield, Birley, Bishopstone, Blakemere, Bridge Sollers, Brinsop, Brobury, Byford, Canon Pyon, Dilwyn, Eardisland, King's Pyon, Kinnersley, Letton, Mansell Gamage, Mansell Lacy, Moccas, Monnington on Wye, Norton Canon, Preston on Wye, Staunton on Wye, Stretford, Weobley, Yazor.	

== Hertfordshire ==
Link to 1888 map showing Hertfordshire PLUs; Link to 1908 map showing Hertfordshire PLUs; Link to 1926 map showing Hertfordshire PLUs

Name	Civil Parishes	Notes
Ampthill PLU	Shillington (5 detached Hertfordshire portions).	Remainder of PLU in Bedfordshire.
Barnet PLU	Chipping Barnet, East Barnet, Elstree, Ridge + detached portion, Shenley + detached portion, Totteridge.	Remainder of PLU in Middlesex.
Berkhampstead PLU	Aldbury, Berkhampstead, Little Gaddesden, Northchurch + 2 detached portions, Puttenham, Tring + detached portion, Wigginton.	Remainder of PLU in Buckinghamshire.
Bishop's Stortford PLU	Albury, Bishop's Stortford, Braughing, Brent Pelham, Furneux Pelham, Little Hadham, Much Hadham, Sawbridgeworth + 2 detached portions, Stocking Pelham, Thorley + detached portion.	Remainder of PLU in Essex.
Buntingford PLU	Anstey, Ardeley, Aspenden, Broadfield, Buckland, Cottered, Great Hormead + detached portion, Layston, Little Hormead + detached portion, Meesden, Rushden, Sandon, Throcking, Wallington, Westmill, Wyddial.	
Edmonton PLU	Cheshunt.	Remainder of PLU in Essex & Middlesex.
Hatfield PLU	Bishops Hatfield, Essendon, North Mimms, Northaw.	
Hemel Hempstead PLU	Bovingdon, Flamstead, Flaunden, Great Gaddesden, Hemel Hempstead, Kings Langley.	
Hertford PLU	All Saints Hertford, Aston + detached portion, Bayford, Bengeo, Benington, Bramfield, Brickendon, Datchworth, Hertingfordbury, Little Amwell + detached portion, Little Berkhampstead + detached portion, Little Munden (detached portion), Sacombe, St Andrew Hertford, St John Hertford, Stapleford, Tewin, Walkern, Watton + detached portion.	
Hitchin PLU	Baldock, Bygrave, Caldecote, Clothall, Codicote, Graveley, Great Wymondley + 2 detached portions, Hexton, Hitchin, Ickleford, Ippollitts, Kimpton, King's Walden, Knebworth, Letchworth + detached portion, Lilley + detached portion, Little Wymondley + 2 detached portions, Newnham, Norton, Offley, Pirton, Radwell, Sheephall, St Paul's Walden, Stevenage, Weston, Willian.	Remainder of PLU in Bedfordshire.
Luton PLU	Caddington (Hertfordshire portion), Kensworth, Studham (Hertfordshire portion), Whipsnade (detached Hertfordshire portion).	Remainder of PLU in Bedfordshire.
Royston PLU	Ashwell, Barkway, Barley, Hinxworth, Kelshall, Nuthampstead, Reed, Royston (Hertfordshire portion), Therfield.	Remainder of PLU in Cambridgeshire & Essex.
St Albans PLU	Harpenden, Redbourn, Sandridge, St Alban, St Michael, St Peter, St Stephen, Wheathampstead.	
Ware PLU	Broxbourne, Eastwick, Gilston + detached portion, Great Amwell + detached portion, Great Munden, Hoddesdon, Hunsdon + detached portion, Little Amwell (detached portion), Little Munden + detached portion, St Margaret, Standon + detached portion, Stanstead Abbots, Thundridge, Ware, Widford, Wormley.	
Watford PLU	Abbots Langley, Aldenham + detached portion, Bushey, Rickmansworth, Sarratt, Watford.	
Welwyn PLU	Ayot St Lawrence, Ayot St Peter, Digswell + 2 detached portions, Welwyn.	

== Huntingdonshire ==
Link to 1888 map showing Huntingdonshire PLUs; Link to 1909 map showing Huntingdonshire PLUs; Link to 1924 map showing Huntingdonshire PLUs

Name	Civil Parishes	Notes
Caxton & Arrington PLU	Great Gransden, Papworth St Agnes (Huntingdonshire portion), Yelling.	Remainder of PLU in Cambridgeshire.
Huntingdon PLU	Abbots Ripton, Alconbury, Alconbury Weston, All Saints Huntingdon, Barham, Brampton, Buckworth, Connington, Coppingford, Easton, Ellington, Godmanchester, Great Raveley, Great Stukeley, Hamerton, Hartford, King's Ripton, Leighton, Little Raveley, Little Stukeley, Ramsey + detached portion, Sapley, Sawtry All Saints & St Andrew, Spaldwick, St Benedict Huntingdon, St John Huntingdon, St Mary Huntingdon + detached portion, Steeple Gidding, Upton, Upwood, Wood Walton, Woolley.	
Oundle PLU	Elton, Great Gidding, Little Gidding, Luddington (Huntingdonshire portion), Lutton (Huntingdonshire portion), Thurning (Huntingdonshire portion), Winwick (Huntingdonshire portion).	Remainder of PLU in Northamptonshire.
Peterborough PLU	Alwalton, Caldecote, Chesterton, Denton, Farcet, Fletton, Folksworth, Glatton, Haddon, Holme, Morborne, Orton Longueville, Orton Waterville, Standground (Huntingdonshire portion), Stilton, Washingley, Water Newton, Wood Stone, Yaxley.	Remainder of PLU in Cambridgeshire, Lincolnshire & Northamptonshire.
St Ives PLU	Bluntisham cum Earith, Broughton, Bury, Colne, Fenstanton, Hemingford Abbots, Hemingford Grey, Hilton, Holywell cum Needingworth, Houghton, Old Hurst, Pidley cum Fenton, Somersham, St Ives, Warboys, Wistow, Woodhurst, Wyton.	Remainder of PLU in Cambridgeshire.
St Neots PLU	Abbotsley, Buckden, Catworth, Diddington, Eynesbury + detached portion, Grafham, Great Paxton, Great Staughton, Hail Weston, Kimbolton, Little Paxton, Midloe, Offord Cluney, Offord D’Arcy, Southoe, St Neots, Stow, Swineshead, Tetwoth + detached portion, Toseland, Waresley.	Remainder of PLU in Bedfordshire & Cambridgeshire.
Stamford PLU	Sibson cum Stibbington.	Remainder of PLU in Lincolnshire, Northamptonshire & Rutland.
Thrapston PLU	Brington, Bythorn, Covington, Keyston, Molesworth, Old Weston.	Remainder of PLU in Northamptonshire.

== Kent ==
Link to 1888 map showing Kent PLUs; Link to 1913 map showing Kent PLUs; Link to 1928 map showing Kent PLUs

Name	Civil Parishes	Notes
Blean PLU	Chislet + detached portion, Christchurch Canterbury, Hackington, Herne, Hoath, Reculver, Seasalter, St Cosmus & St Damian in the Blean, St Dunstan Canterbury, St Gregory the Great Canterbury, Staplegate Canterbury, Sturry, Swalecliffe, The Archbishops Palace Precincts Canterbury, Westbere + detached portion, Whitstable + detached portion.	
Bridge PLU	Adisham, Barham, Bekesbourne + 2 detached portions, Bishopsbourne, Bridge, Chartham, Fordwich + detached portion, Harbledown, Holy Cross Westgate Canterbury (part), Ickham + 2 detached portions, Kingston + 2 detached portions, Littlebourne, Lower Hardres, Milton, Nackington, Patrixbourne, Petham, St Nicholas Hospital Harbledown, Stodmarsh, Thanington, The Mint Harbledown, Upper Hardres, Waltham + 3 detached portions, Wickhambreux + detached portion, Womenswold.	
Bromley PLU	Beckenham, Bromley, Chelsfield, Chislehurst, Cudham, Downe, Farnborough, Foots Cray + 2 detached portions, Hayes, Keston, Knockholt, Mottingham (added 1887), North Cray, Orpington, St Mary Cray, St Paul's Cray, West Wickham.	
Canterbury PLU	All Saints Canterbury, Black Princes Chantry Canterbury, East Bridge Hospital Canterbury, Holy Cross Westgate Canterbury (part), Old Castle Precincts Canterbury, St Alphege Canterbury, St Andrew Canterbury, St Augustine Canterbury, St George the Martyr Canterbury, St Margaret Canterbury, St Martin Canterbury, St Mary Bredin Canterbury, St Mary Bredman Canterbury, St Mary Magdalene Canterbury, St Mary Northgate Canterbury, St Mildred Canterbury, St Paul Canterbury, St Peter Canterbury, The Whitefriars Canterbury.	
Cranbrook PLU	Benenden, Cranbrook, Frittenden, Goudhurst, Hawkhurst, Sandhurst.	
Dartford PLU	Ash, Bexley, Crayford, Darenth, Dartford, East Wickham, Erith, Eynsford, Farningham, Fawkham, Hartley, Horton Kirby, Kingsdown, Longfield, Lullingstone, Ridley, Southfleet, Stone, Sutton at Hone, Swanscombe, Wilmington.	
Dover PLU	Alkham, Buckland, Capel le Ferne, Charlton, Coldred, Denton, Dover Castle, East Cliffe Dover, East Langdon, Ewell, Guston, Hougham, Lydden + detached portion, Oxney, Poulton, Ringwold, River + detached portion, Sibertswold, St James the Apostle Dover, St Margaret at Cliffe + detached portion, St Mary the Virgin Dover, West Cliffe, West Langdon, Whitfield, Wootton.	
East Ashford PLU	Aldington + 3 detached portions, Bilsington + detached portion, Bircholt, Bonnington, Boughton Aluph, Brabourne + detached portion, Brook + detached portion, Challock, Chilham, Crundale + 2 detached portions, Eastwell, Godmersham + detached portion, Hastingleigh, Hinxhill, Hurst + 2 detached portions, Kennington, Mersham, Molash, Orlestone + 2 detached portions, Ruckinge, Sevington, Smeeth, Warehorne + 4 detached portions, Willesborough, Wye.	
Eastry PLU	Ash, Barfreston, Betshanger, Chillingden, Deal, Eastry, Elmstone, Eythorne, Goodnestone + detached portion, Great Mongeham + detached portion, Ham + detached portion, Knowlton, Little Mongeham, Nonington, Northbourne + 2 detached portions, Preston + detached portion, Ripple, Sholden, St Bartholomew Hospital Sandwich, St Clements Sandwich, St Mary Sandwich, St Peter Sandwich, Staple + detached portion, Stourmouth, Sutton + detached portion, Tilmanstone, Waldershare + detached portion, Walmer + detached portion, Wingham + detached portion, Woodnesborough, Worth.	
Elham PLU	Acrise, Cheriton, Elham, Elmsted, Folkestone, Hawkinge, Lyming, Lympne, Monks Horton, Newington, Paddlesworth, Postling, Saltwood, Sellinge, St Leonard Hythe, Stanford, Stelling, Stelling Minnis, Stowting, Swingfield.	
Faversham PLU	Badlesmere, Boughton under Blean + detached portion, Buckland + detached portion, Davington, Doddington + detached portion, Dunkirk + detached portion, Eastling, Faversham + 2 detached portions, Goodnestone, Graveney, Hernehill + detached portion, Leveland, Linsted, Luddenham + 3 detached portions, Newnham, Norton, Oare + detached portion, Ospringe + detached portion, Preston + detached portion, Selling, Sheldwich, Stalisfield, Stone + detached portion, Teynham, Throwley.	
Gravesend & Milton PLU	Gravesend, Milton.	
Hollingbourne PLU	Bearsted ( 3 detached portions), Bicknor, Boughton Malherbe, Boxley, Bredhurst, Bromfield, Chart Sutton, Detling, East Sutton, Frinsted, Harrietsham, Headcorn, Hollingbourne, Hucking, Langley, Leeds, Lenham, Otterden, Stockbury, Sutton Valence, Thornham, Ulcombe, Wormshill.	
Hoo PLU	Allhallows Hoo, Cooling, High Halstow, Hoo, Isle of Grain, St Mary Hoo, Stoke, The Mean.	
Isle of Thanet PLU	Acol, Birchington, Minster + detached portion, Monkton, Ramsgate, Sarre, St John the Baptist Margate, St Lawrence, St Nicholas at Wade, St Peter, Stonar.	
Maidstone PLU	Bearsted, Boughton Monchelsea, East Barming, East Farleigh, Hunton, Linton, Loose, Maidstone, Marden, Nettlested, Otham, Staplehurst, Teston, West Barming, West Farleigh, Yalding.	
Malling PLU	Addington, Allington, Aylesford, Birling, Burham, Ditton, East Malling, East Peckham, Ightham, Leybourne + detached portion, Mereworth, Offham, Ryarsh + detached portion, Shipborne, Snodland + detached portion, Stansted, Trotterscliffe, Wateringbury, West Malling, West Peckham, Wouldham, Wrotham + 2 detached portions.	
Medway PLU	Cathedral Precincts Rochester, Chatham, Gillingham, Grange, St Margaret Rochester, St Nicholas Rochester.	
Milton PLU	Bapchild + detached portion, Bobbing, Borden, Bredgar, Hartlip, Iwade, Kingsdown, Lower Halstow, Milsted, Milton + detached portion, Murston + 2 detached portions, Newington, Rainham, Rodmersham, Sittingbourne + 3 detached portions, Tonge, Tunstall, Upchurch.	
Romney Marsh PLU	Blackmanstone, Brenzett + detached portion, Brookland + 2 detached portions, Burmarsh, Dymchurch, Eastbridge, Fairfield, Hope All Saints + detached portion, Ivychurch, Lydd, Midley + detached portion, New Romney + detached portion, Newchurch, Old Romney, Orgarswick, Snargate, Snave + detached portion, St Mary in the Marsh, West Hythe + detached portion.	
Rye PLU	Broomhill (Kent portion).	Remainder of PLU in Sussex.
Sevenoaks PLU	Brasted + detached portion, Chevening, Chiddingstone + detached portion, Cowden, Edenbridge, Halstead, Hever + detached portion, Kemsing + detached portion, Leigh + 2 detached portions, Otford, Penshurst + detached portion, Seal, Sevenoaks, Shoreham, Sundridge, Westerham.	
Sheppey PLU	Eastchurch, Elmley, Harty, Leysdown, Minster, Queenborough, Warden.	
Strood PLU	Chalk, Cliffe, Cobham, Cuxton, Denton, Frindsbury, Halling, Higham, Ifield, Luddesdown, Meopham, Northfleet, Nursted, Shorne, Strood.	Originally called North Aylesford.
Tenterden PLU	Appledore + 3 detached portions, Biddenden, Ebony + detached portion, High Halden, Kenardington + detached portion, Newenden, Rolvenden, Stone, Tenterden, Wittersham, Woodchurch + detached portion.	
Ticehurst PLU	Frant (Kent portion), Lamberhurst (Kent portion).	Remainder of PLU in Sussex.
Tunbridge PLU	Ashurst, Bidborough, Brenchley, Capel, Hadlow, Horsmonden (Kent portion), Pembury, Speldhurst, Tunbridge.	Remainder of PLU in Sussex.
West Ashford PLU	Ashford, Bethersden, Charing, Egerton, Great Chart, Hothfield, Kingsnorth, Little Chart + detached portion, Pluckley, Shadoxhurst, Smarden, Westwell.	

== Lancashire ==
Link to 1888 map showing Lancashire PLUs; Link to 1914 map showing Lancashire PLUs; Link to 1928 map showing Lancashire PLUs

Name	Civil Parishes	Notes
Ashton under Lyne PLU	Ashton under Lyne, Denton, Droylsden, Haughton.	Remainder of PLU in Cheshire.
Barrow in Furness PLP	Barrow in Furness.	
Barton upon Irwell PLU	Barton upon Irwell, Clifton, Flixton, Houghton Middleton & Arbury, Stretford, Urmston, Worsley.	
Blackburn PLU	Balderston, Billington, Blackburn, Church, Clayton in le-Dale, Clayton-le-Moors, Dinckley, Eccleshill, Great Harwood, Little Harwood, Livesey, Lower Darwen, Mellor, Osbaldeston, Oswaldtwistle, Over Darwen, Pleasington, Ramsgreave, Rishton, Salesbury, Tockholes, Wilpshire, Witton, Yate & Pickup Bank.	
Bolton PLU	Bradshaw, Breightmet, Darcy Lever, Edgeworth, Entwisle, Farnworth, Great Bolton, Great Lever, Halliwell, Harwood, Heaton, Horwich, Kearsley, Little Bolton, Little Hulton, Little Lever, Longworth, Lostock, Middle Hulton, Over Hulton, Quarlton, Rumworth, Sharples, Tonge with Haulgh, Turton, West Houghton.	
Burnley PLU	Altham, Barley with Wheatley Booth, Barrowford Booth, Briercliffe with Extwistle, Burnley, Cliviger, Colne, Dunnockshaw + detached portion, Foulridge + detached portion, Goldshaw Booth, Habergham Eaves, Hapton, Heyhouses, Higham with Westclose Booth + detached portion, Huncoat, Igtenhill Park, Marsden, Old Laund Booth + detached portion, Padiham, Read, Reedley Hallows Filly Close & New Laund Booth, Roughlee Booth, Simonstone, Trawden, Wheatley Carr Booth, Worsthorn with Hurstwood.	
Bury PLU	Ainsworth, Ashworth, Birtle cum Bamford + 4 detached portions, Bury, Elton + 2 detached portions, Heap + 2 detached portions, Hopwood, Pilkington, Pilsworth, Radcliffe, Tottington Lower End, Walmersley & Shlittleworth.	
Chorley PLU	Adlington, Anderton, Anglezark, Bretherton, Brindle, Charnock Richard, Chorley, Clayton-le-Woods, Coppull, Croston, Cuerden, Duxbury, Eccleston, Euxton, Heapy, Heath Charnock, Heskin, Hoghton, Leyland, Mawdesley, Rivington, Ulnes Walton, Wheelton, Whittle-le-Woods, Withnell.	
Chorlton PLU	Ardwick, Burnage, Chorlton cum Hardy, Chorlton upon Medlock, Didsbury, Gorton, Hulme, Levenshulme, Moss Side + 2 detached portions, Openshaw, Rusholme, Withington.	
Clitheroe PLU	Aighton Bailey & Chaigley, Chatburn, Chipping, Clitheroe, Clitheroe Castle, Downham, Leagram, Little Bowland, Mearley, Mitton Henthorn & Coldcoats + detached portion, Pendleton, Thornley with Wheatley, Twiston, Whalley, Wiswell, Worston.	Remainder of PLU in West Riding of Yorkshire.
Fylde PLU	Bispham with Norbreck, Brining with Kellamergh, Carleton, Clifton with Salwick, Elswick, Freckleton, Great & Little Singleton, Greenalgh with Thistleton, Hardhorn with Newton, Larbeck with Little Eccleston, Layton with Warbreck, Lytham, Marton, Medlar with Wesham, Newton with Scales, Poulton in the Fylde, Ribby with Wrea, Thornton, Treales Wharles & Roseacre, Warton, Weeton with Preese, Westby with Plumpton.	
Garstang PLU	Barnacre with Bonds, Bilsborough, Bleasdale, Cabus, Catterall, Claughton, Cleveley, Forton, Garstang, Great Eccleston, Halleth, Hambleton, Inskip with Sowerby, Kirkland, Myerscough, Nateby, Nether Wyersdale, Out Rawcliffe, Pilling, Preesall with Hackinsall, Stalmime with Stainall, Upper Rawcliffe with Tarnicar, Winmarleigh.	
Haslingden PLU	Accrington, Cowpe Lench Newhall Hey & Hall Carr, Haslingden, Henheads + detached portion, Higher Booths, Lower Booths + 3 detached portions, Musbury, Newchurch, Tottington Higher End.	
Kendal PLU	Dalton.	Remainder of PLU in Westmorland.
Lancaster PLU	Aldcliffe, Ashton with Stodday, Bolton le Sands, Bulk, Carnforth, Cockerham, Cockersand Abbey, Ellel, Heaton with Oxcliffe, Heysham, Lancaster, Middleton, Over Wyersdale, Overton, Poulton Bare & Torrisholme, Priest Hutton, Scotforth, Silverdale, Skerton + detached portion, Slyne with Hest, Thurnham, Warton with Lindeth, Yealand Conyers, Yealand Redmayne.	
Leigh PLU	Astley, Atherton, Bedford, Culcheth, Golborne, Kenyon, Lowton, Penington, Tyldesley with Shakerley, West Leigh.	
Liverpool PLP	Liverpool.	
Lunesdale PLU	Arkholme with Cawood, Borwick, Burrow with Burrow, Cantsfield, Caton, Claughton, Gressingham, Halton, Hornby with Farleton, Ireby, Leek, Melling with Wrayton, Nether Kellet, Over Kellet, Quernmore, Roeburndale, Tatham, Tunstall, Wennington, Whittington, Wray with Botton.	
Manchester PLP	Manchester.	
Oldham PLU	Alkrington, Chadderton + detached portion, Crompton, Middleton, Oldham, Royton, Thornham, Tonge.	
Ormskirk PLU	Altcar, Aughton, Bickerstaffe, Birkdale, Bispham, Burscough, Downholland, Formby, Halsall, Hesketh with Becconsall, Lathom, Lydiate, Maghull, Melling, North Meols, Ormskirk, Rufford, Scarisbrick, Simonswood, Skelmersdale, Tarleton.	
Prescot PLU	Bold, Cronton, Ditton, Eccleston, Hale, Halewood, Huyton with Roby, Knowsley, Little Woolton, Much Woolton, Parr, Prescot, Rainford, Rainhill, Speke, Sutton, Tarbock, Whiston, Widnes, Windle.	
Preston PLU	Alston, Broughton, Cuerdale, Dilworth, Dutton + detached portion, Elston, Farington, Fishwich, Fulwood, Goosnargh with Newsham + detached portion, Grimsargh with Brockholes, Haighton, Hothersall, Howick, Hutton, Lea Ashton Ingol & Cottam, Little Hoole, Longton, Lordship of Barton, Much Hoole, Penwortham, Preston, Ribbleton, Ribchester, Samelsbury, Walton-le-Dale, Whittingham, Woodplumpton.	
Prestwich PLU	Beswick, Blackley, Bradford, Cheetham, Crumpsall, Failsworth, Gorton (detached portion), Great Heaton + 2 detached portions, Harpurhey, Little Heaton + detached portion, Moston, Newton + detached portion, Prestwich + detached portion.	
Rochdale PLU	Blatchinworth & Calderbrook, Butterworth, Castleton, Spotland, Wardleworth, Wuerdle & Wardle.	
Salford PLU	Broughton, Pendlebury, Pendleton, Salford.	
Stockport PLU	Heaton Norris, Reddish.	Remainder of PLU in Cheshire.
Todmorden PLU	Todmorden & Walsden.	Remainder of PLU in West Riding of Yorkshire.
Toxteth Park PLP	Toxteth Park.	
Ulverston PLU	Aldingham, Angerton, Birkrigg Common common to Urswick and Aldingham, Blawith, Broughton East or Broughton in Cartmel, Broughton West or Broughton in Furness, Cartmell Fell, Church Coniston, Claife, Colton, Dalton, Dunnerdale cum Seathwaite, Egton cum Newland, Hawkshead & Monk Coniston with Skelwith, Kirkby Ireleth, Lower Allithwaite, Lower Holker, Lowick, Mansriggs, Osmotherley, Pennington, Satterthwaite, Staveley, Subberthwaite, Trover, Ulverston, Upper Allithwaite, Upper Holker, Urswick.	
Warrington PLU	Buptonwood, Cuerdley, Great Sankey, Haydock, Newton in Makerfield, Penketh, Poulton with Fearnhead, Rixton cum Glazebrook, Southworth with Croft, Warrington, Winwick with Hulme, Woolston & Martinscroft.	Remainder of PLU in Cheshire.
West Derby PLU	Aintree, Allerton, Bootle cum Linacre, Childwall, Croxteth Park, Everton, Fazakerley, Garston, Great Crosby, Ince Blundell, Kirkby, Kirkdale, Litherland, Little Crosby, Lunt, Netherton, Orrell & Ford + detached portion, Thornton, Walton on the Hill, Wavertree, West Derby.	
Wigan PLU	Abram, Ashton in Makerfield, Aspull, Billinge Chapel End + detached portion, Billinge Higher End, Blackrod, Dalton, Haigh, Hindley, Ince in Makerfield, Orrell, Parbold, Pemberton, Shevington, Standish with Landtree, Upholland, Wigan, Winstanley + 2 detached portions, Worthington, Wrightington.	

== Leicestershire ==
Link to 1888 map showing Leicestershire PLUs; Link to 1909 map showing Leicestershire PLUs; Link to 1923 map showing Leicestershire PLUs

Name	Civil Parishes	Notes
Ashby de la Zouch PLU	Appleby Magna (Leicestershire portion), Ashby de la Zouch, Bardon, Blackfordby, Cole Orton, Heather, Hugglescote & Donington, Nether & Over Seal, Normanton le Heath, Osgathorpe, Packington, Ravenstone with Snibston, Snarestone, Staunton Harold, Swannington, Swepstone, Thringstone, Whitwick, Worthington.	Remainder of PLU in Derbyshire.
Atherstone PLU	Atterton, Fenny Drayton, Ratcliffe Culey, Sheepy Magna, Sheepy Parva, Witherley.	Remainder of PLU in Warwickshire.
Barrow upon Soar PLU	Anstey, Anstey Pastures, Barkby, Barkby Thorpe, Barrow upon Soar, Beaumont Leys, Beeby, Belgrave, Birstall, Cossington, Cropston, Gilroes, Leicester Abbey, Leicester Frith, Montsorrel, Newtown Linford, Queniborough, Quorndon, Ratcliffe on the Wreak, Rearsby, Rothley, Seagrave, Sileby, South Croxton, Swithland, Syston, Thrussington, Thurcaston, Thurmaston North, Thurmaston South, Ulverscroft, Walton on the Wolds, Wanlip, Woodhouse.	
Billesdon PLU	Allexton, Billesdon, Burton Overy, Bushby, Carlton Curlieu, Cold Newton, East Norton, Evington, Frisby, Galby, Goadby, Great Glen, Great Stretton, Halstead, Houghton on the Hill, Humberstone, Hungerton, Illston on the Hill, Keyham, King's Norton, Launde, Little Stretton, Loddington, Lowesby, Marefield, Newton Harcourt, Noseley, Owston & Newbold, Rolleston, Scraptoft, Skeffington, Stoughton, Thurnby, Tilton, Tugby, Whatborough, Wistow, Withcote.	
Bingham PLU	Barkestone, Plungar.	Remainder of PLU in Nottinghamshire.
Blaby PLU	Aylestone, Blaby, Braunstone, Braunstone Frith, Cosby, Countesthorpe, Croft, East Leicester Forest, Enderby, Foston, Freake's Ground, Glen Parva, Glenfield, Glenfield Frith, Huncote, Kilby, Kirby Frith, Kirby Muxloe, Knighton, Knoll & Basset House, Lubbesthorpe, Narborough, New Found Pool, New Parks, Oadby, Potters Marston, Thurlaston, West Leicester Forest, Whetstone, Wigston Magna.	
Grantham PLU	Belvoir, Bottesford, Croxton Kerrial, Harston, Knipton, Muston, Redmile.	Remainder of PLU in Lincolnshire.
Hinckley PLU	Aston Flamville, Barwell, Burbage, Earl Shilton, Elmesthorpe, Higham on the Hill, Hinckley (Leicestershire portion), Sapcote, Sharnford, Stoke Golding, Stoney Stanton.	Remainder of PLU in Warwickshire.
Leicester PLU	All Saints Leicester, Augustine Friars Leicester, Blackfriars Leicester, Castle View Leicester, St Leonard Leicester, St Margaret Leicester, St Martin Leicester, St Mary Leicester, St Nicholas Leicester, The Newarke Leicester.	
Loughborough PLU	Belton, Burton on the Wolds, Charley, Cotes, Dishley with Thorpe Acre, Garendon & Knight Thorpe, Hathern, Hoton, Long Whatton, Loughborough, Prestwold, Sheepshead, Woodthorpe, Wymeswold.	Remainder of PLU in Nottinghamshire.
Lutterworth PLU	Arnesby, Ashby Magna, Ashby Parva, Bittessy, Bitteswell, Broughton Astley, Bruntingthorpe, Catthorpe, Cotesbach, Dunton Bassett, Frowlesworth, Gilmorton, Great Claybrooke, Kimcote & Walton & Waltoll in Knaptoft, Knaptoft, Leire, Little Claybrooke, Lutterworth, Misterton, North Kilworth, Peatling Magna, Peatling Parva, Shawell, Shearsby, South Kilworth, Swinford, Ullesthorpe, Wigston Parva, Willoughby Waterless.	Remainder of PLU in Northamptonshire & Warwickshire.
Market Bosworth PLU	Bagworth, Barlestone, Barton in the Beans, Bilstone, Cadeby, Carlton, Congerstone, Dadlington, Desford, Gopsall, Ibstock, Kirkby Mallory, Market Bosworth, Markfield, Nailstone, Newbold Verdon, Norton juxta Twycross, Odstone, Orton on the Hill, Osbaston, Peckletor, Ratby, Shackerstone, Shenton, Sibson, Stanton under Bardon, Stapleton, Sutton Cheney, Thornton, Twycross, Upton.	
Market Harborough PLU	Cranoe, East Langton, Fleckney, Foxton, Glooston, Great Bowden, Gumley, Husbands Bosworth, Kibworth Beauchamp, Kibworth Harcourt, Laughton, Lubenham, Market Harborough, Mowsley, Saddington, Shangton, Smeeton Westerby, Stonton Wyville, Theddingworth, Thorpe Langton, Tur Langton, Welham, West Langton.	Remainder of PLU in Northamptonshire.
Melton Mowbray PLU	Ab Kettleby, Asfordby, Ashby Folville, Barsby, Bescaby, Branston, Brooksby, Buckminster, Burrow on the Hill, Burton Lazars, Coston, Eastwell, Eaton, Edmondthorpe, Freeby, Frisby on the Wreak, Gaddesby, Garthorpe, Goadby Marwood, Great Dalby, Grimston, Harby, Hoby, Holwell, Hose, Kirby Bellars, Lands rated to the parishes of Coston & Garthorpe, Little Dalby, Long Clawson, Melton Mowbray, Nether Broughton, Old Dalby, Pickwell with Leesthorpe, Ragdale, Rotherby, Saltby, Saxby, Saxelby, Scalford, Sewstern, Shoby, Somerby, Sproxton, Stapleford, Stathern, Stonesby, Sysonby, Thorpe Arnold, Thorpe Satchville, Twyford, Waltham on the Wolds, Wartnaby, Welby, Wycomb & Chadwell, Wyfordby with Brentingby, Wymondham.	Remainder of PLU in Nottinghamshire.
Oakham PLU	Cold Overton, Knossington.	Remainder of PLU in Rutland.
Rugby PLU	Westrill & Starmore.	Remainder of PLU in Northamptonshire & Warwickshire.
Shardlow PLU	Breedon on the Hill, Castle Donington, Diseworth, Hemington, Isley Walton, Kegworth, Langley Priory, Lockington.	Remainder of PLU in Derbyshire & Nottinghamshire.
Uppingham PLU	Blaston, Bringhurst, Drayton, Great Easton, Hallaton, Horninghold, Medbourne, Nevill Holt, Slawston, Stockerston.	Remainder of PLU in Northamptonshire & Rutland.

== Lincolnshire ==
Link to 1888 map showing Lincolnshire PLUs; Link to 1910 map showing Lincolnshire PLUs; Link to 1930 map showing Lincolnshire PLUs

Name	Civil Parishes	Notes
Boston PLU	Algarkirk, Amber Hill, Benington, Bicker, Boston + 2 detached portions, Brothertoft, Butterwick, Carrington, Copping Syke, Dogdyke + detached portion, Drainage Marsh, Ferry Corner Plot + 3 detached portions, Fishtoft, Fosdyke, Frampton + 3 detached portions, Freiston, Frithville + 4 detached portions, Gibbet Hill, Great Beats, Great Brand End Plot, Hall Hills, Hart's Grounds, Haven Bank + detached portion, Kirton + 3 detached portions, Langriville, Leake, Leverton, Little Beats, Little Brand End Plot, Mown Rakes, North Forty Foot Bank, Pelhams Lands + detached portion, Pepper Gowt + detached portion, Royalty Farm, Seven Acres, Shuff Fen, Sibsey + detached portion, Simon Weir, Skirbeck, Skirbeck Quarter, South of the Witham, Sutterton, Swineshead + 3 detached portions, The Friths, Thornton le Fen, Undivided Lands common to Swineshead and Wigtoft, Westville, Wigtoft + 2 detached portions, Wrangle, Wyberton + 4 detached portions.	
Bourn PLU	Aslackby, Aunby, Baston, Billingborough, Birthorpe + detached portion, Bourn, Careby, Carlby, Castle Bytham, Corby, Counthorpe, Creeton, Deeping St James, Dowsby, Dunsby, Edenham, Folkingham, Hacconby, Holywell, Horbling, Irnham, Kirkby Underwood, Laughton, Little Bytham, Manthorpe, Market Deeping + 2 detached portions, Morton, Pointon, Rippingale, Semperingham, Swayfield, Swinstead, Thurlby, Toft & Lound, Witham on the Hill.	
Caistor PLU	Ashby cum Fenby, Atterby, Aylesby, Barnoldby le Beck, Beelsby, Bigby, Bishop Norton, Bradley, Brigsley, Brocklesby, Buslingthorpe, Cabourne, Caistor, Claxby, Clee, Cleethorpe, Clixby, Croxby, Cuxwold, East Ravendale, East Torrington, Glentham, Grasby, Great Coates, Great Grimsby, Great Limber, Habrough, Hatcliffe, Hawerby cum Beesby, Healing, Holton le Moor, Humberston, Immingham, Irby, Keelby, Kingerby, Kirkby cum Osgodby, Kirmond le Mire, Laceby, Legsby, Limber, Linwood, Lissington, Little Coates, Market Rasen, Middle Rasen, Nettleton, Newton by Toft, Normandy le Wolds, North Kelsey, North Owersby, North Willingham, Riby, Rothwell, Scartho, Searby cum Owmby, Sixhills, Snitterby, Somerby, South Kelsey, South Owersby, Stainton le Vale, Stallingborough, Swallow, Swinhop, Tealby, Thoresway, Thorganby, Thornton le Moor, Toft next Newton, Usselby, Waddingham, Walesby, Waltham, West Rasen, West Ravendale, Wold Newton.	
Gainsborough PLU	Blyborough, Blyton, Brampton, Coates, Corringham, East Ferry, East Stockwith, Fenton, Fillingham, Gainsborough, Gate Burton, Glentworth, Grayingham, Greenhill & Redhill, Hardwick, Harpswell, Haxey, Heapham, Hemswell, Kettlethorpe, Kexby, Knaith, Lands common to Scotton and East Ferry, Laughton, Lea, Marton, Morton, Newton upon Trent, Northorpe, Owston + detached portion, Pilham, Scotter, Scotton, Southorpe, Springthorpe, Stow, Sturton, Torksey, Upton, Walkerith, West Butterwick, Wildsworth, Willingham, Willoughton.	Remainder of PLU in Nottinghamshire.
Glanford Brigg PLU	Alkborough, Appleby, Ashby, Barnetby le Wold, Barrow upon Humber, Barton upon Humber, Bonby, Bottesford, Broughton, Brumby, Burringham, Burton upon Stather, Cadney cum Howsham, Cleatham, Crosby, Croxton, East Butterwick, East Halton, Elsham, Flixborough, Frodingham, Glanford Brigg, Goxhill, Gunhouse, Hibaldstow, Holme, Horkstow, Kirmington, Kirton in Lindsey, Manton, Melton Ross, Messingham, Newstead, North Killingholme, Raventhorpe, Redbourne, Roxby cum Risby, Saxby All Saints, Scawby, Scunthorpe, South Ferriby, South Killingholme, Thornton Curtis, Twigmoor, Ulceby, West Halton, Whitton, Winteringham, Winterton, Wootton, Worlaby, Wrawby cum Brigg.	
Goole PLU	Garthorpe, Luddington.	Remainder of PLU in West Riding of Yorkshire.
Grantham PLU	Ancaster, Barrowby, Bassingthorpe, Belton, Bitchfield, Boothby Pagnal, Braceby, Burton Coggles, Carlton Scroop, Colsterworth, Denton, Easton, Grantham, Grantham Grange, Great Gonerby, Great Ponton, Gunby, Haceby, Harlaxton, Harrowby, Haydor, Honington, Hough on the Hill, Humby, Ingoldsby, Keisby, Lenton, Little Ponton, Londonthorpe, Manthorpe cum Little Gonerby, Normanton, North Stoke, North Witham, Osgodby, Pickworth, Ropsley, Sapperton, Skillington, Somerby, South Stoke, South Witham, Spittlegate Houghton & Walton, Stainby, Welby, Woolsthorpe, Wyville with Hungerton.	Remainder of PLU in Leicestershire.
Holbeach PLU	Central Wingland (Lincolnshire portion), Fleet, Gedney, Gedney Hill, Holbeach, Lutton, Sutton St Edmunds, Sutton St James, Sutton St Mary, Tydd St Mary + detached portion, Whaplode.	Remainder of PLU in Norfolk.
Horncastle PLU	Asgarby, Ashby Puerorum, Asterby, Bag Enderby, Baumber, Belchford, Benniworth, Bucknall, Cawkwell, Claxby Pluckacre, Coningsby + 4 detached portions, Dalderby, East Barkwith, Edlington, Fulletby, Gautby, Goulceby, Great Sturton, Greetham, Hagworthingham, Haltham, Hameringham, Hatton, Hemingby, High Toynton, Horncastle, Horsington, Kirkby on Bain, Kirkstead, Langton, Langton by Wragby, Low Toynton, Lusby, Mareham le Fen, Mareham on the Hill, Market Stainton, Martin, Miningsby, Minting, Moorby, Panton, Ranby, Revesby, Roughton, Salmonby, Scamblesby, Scrafield, Scrivelsby, Somersby, Sotby, Stixwould, Tattershall, Tattershall Thorpe, Tetford, Thimbleby, Thornton, Tumby, Tupholme, Waddingworth, West Ashby, West Barkwith, West Torrington, Wildmore, Wilksby, Winceby, Wispington, Wood Enderby, Woodhall, Wragby.	
Lincoln PLU	Aisthorpe, Apley, Aubourn, Bardney, Barlings, Bishop's Palace Lincoln, Boothby Graffoe, Boultham, Bracebridge, Branston, Brattleby, Broxholme, Bullington, Burton, Caenby, Cammeringham, Canwick, Cherry Willingham, Cold Bath House Lincoln, Cold Hanworth, Coldstead, Coleby, Doddington, Dunholme, Dunston, Eagle, Eagle Hall, East Firsby, Faldingworth, Fiskerton, Friesthorpe, Fulnetby, Goltho, Grange de Lings, Greetwell, Hackthorn, Haddington, Harmston, Heighington, Holton cum Beckering, Ingham, Mere, Metheringham, Monks Liberty Lincoln, Morton, Navenby, Nettleham, Newball, Nocton, Normanby, North Carlton, North Hykeham, Owmby, Potter Hanworth, Rand, Reepham, Riseholme, Saxby, Saxilby, Scampton, Scothern, Skellingthorpe, Skinnand, Snarford, Snelland, South Carlton, South Common Lincoln, South Hykeham, Spridlington, St Benedict Lincoln, St Botolph Lincoln, St John in Newport Lincoln + detached portion, St Margaret Lincoln + 3 detached portions, St Mark Lincoln, St Martin Lincoln + detached portion, St Mary le Wigford with Holmes Common Lincoln, St Mary Magdalene Lincoln, St Michael on the Mount Lincoln, St Nicholas Lincoln + 3 detached portions, St Paul in the Bail Lincoln, St Peter at Arches Lincoln, St Peter at Gowts Lincoln, St Peter in Eastgate Lincoln + 3 detached portions, St Swithin Lincoln, Stainfield, Stainton by Langworth, Sudbrooke, Swinethorpe, Thorpe in the Fallows, Thorpe on the Hill, Waddington, Washingborough, Welton, West Firsby, Whisby, Wickenby.	
Louth PLU	Aby with Greenfield, Alvingham, Authorpe, Beesby, Belleau, Binbrook, Biscathorpe, Brackenborough, Burgh on Bain, Burwell, Calcethorpe, Castle Carlton, Claythorpe, Conisholme, Covenham St Bartholomew, Covenham St Mary, Donnington on Bain, East Wykeham, Farford cum Maidenwell, Fotherby, Fulstow, Gayton le Marsh, Gayton le Wold, Grainsby, Grainthorpe, Great Carlton, Grimblethorpe, Grimoldby, Hainton, Hallington, Hannah cum Hagnaby, Haugh, Haugham, Holton le Clay, Keddington, Kelstern, Legbourne, Little Carlton, Little Cawthorpe, Little Grimsby, Louth, Louth Park, Ludborough, Ludford Magna, Ludford Parva, Mablethorpe, Maltby le Marsh, Manby, Marsh Chapel, Muckton, North Coates, North Cockerington, North Elkington, North Ormsby, North Reston, North Somercotes, North Thoresby, Oxcombe, Raithby cum Maltby, Ruckland, Saleby with Thoresthorpe, Saltfleetby All Saints, Saltfleetby St Clement, Saltfleetby St Peter, Skidbrooke with Saltfleet Haven, South Cockerington, South Elkington, South Reston, South Somercotes, South Thoresby, South Willingham, Stenigot, Stewton, Strubby with Woodthorpe, Swaby, Tathwell, Tetney, Theddlethorpe All Saints, Theddlethorpe St Helen, Tothill, Trusthorpe, Utterby, Waithe, Walmsgate, Welton le Wold, Withcall, Wither with Stain, Worlaby, Wyham cum Cadeby, Yarborough.	
Newark PLU	Allington, Barkston, Bassingham, Beckingham, Bennington Grange, Brant Broughton, Carlton le Moorland, Caythorpe, Claypole, Dry Doddington, Fenton, Foston, Fulbeck, Hougham, Long Bennington, Marston, North Scarle, Norton Disney, Sedgebrook, Stapleford, Stragglethorpe, Stubton, Swinderby, Syston, Thurlby, Westborough.	Remainder of PLU in Nottinghamshire.
Peterborough PLU	Crowland.	Remainder of PLU in Cambridgeshire, Huntingdonshire & Northamptonshire.
Sleaford PLU	Anwick, Asgarby, Ashby de la Launde, Aswarby, Aunsby, Billinghay, Blankney, Bloxholm, Brauncewell with Dunsby, Burton Pedwardine, Byard's Leap, Cranwell, Culverthorpe, Dembleby, Digby, Dorrington, Evedon, Ewerby, Great Hale, Haverholme Priory, Heckington, Helpringham, Holdingham, Howell, Kelby, Kirkby Green, Kirkby la Thorpe, Leadenham, Leasingham, Little Hale, Martin, New Sleaford, Newton, North Kyme, North Rauceby, Old Sleaford + detached portion, Osbournby, Quarrington, Rowston, Roxholme, Ruskington + detached portion, Scopwick, Scott Willoughby, Scredington, Silk Willoughby, South Kyme, South Rauceby, Spanby, Swarby, Swatton, Temple Bruer with Temple High Grange, Thorpe Tilney, Threckingham, Timberland, Walcot, Walcott, Welbourn, Wellingore, Wilsford.	
Spalding PLU	Cowbit, Deeping St Nicholas, Donington, Gosberton, Moulton, Pinchbeck, Quadring, Spalding, Surfleet + detached portion, Weston	
Spilsby PLU	Addlethorpe, Alford, Anderby, Ashby by Partney, Aswardby, Bilsby, Bolingbroke, Bratoft, Brinkhill, Burgh le Marsh, Calceby, Candlesby + detached portion, Claxby, Croft, Cumberworth, Dalby, Driby, East Keal, East Kirkby, Eastville, Farlesthorpe, Firsby, Friskney, Great Steeping, Gunby, Hagnaby, Halton Holegate, Hareby, Harrington, Hogsthorpe, Hundleby, Huttoft, Ingoldmells, Irby in the Marsh, Langton by Spilsby, Little Steeping, Markby, Mavis Enderby, Midville, Mumby cum Chapel, Orby, Partney, Raithby, Rigsby cum Ailby, Sausthorpe, Scremby, Skegness, Skendleby, South Ormsby, Spilsby, Stickford, Stickney, Sutterby, Sutton le Marsh, Thorpe St Peter, Toynton All Saints, Toynton St Peter, Ulceby with Fordington, Wainfleet All Saints, Wainfleet St Mary, Well, Welton le Marsh, West Fen, West Keal, Willoughby with Sloothby, Winthorpe.	
Stamford PLU	All Saints Stamford, Barholm + 2 detached portions, Braceborough, Greatford + detached portion, St George Stamford, St John Stamford, St Mary Stamford, St Michael Stamford, Stowe + detached portion, Tallington + detached portion, Uffington + detached portion, West Deeping + detached portion, Wilsthorpe.	Remainder of PLU in Huntingdonshire, Northamptonshire & Rutland.
Thorne PLU	Althorpe, Amcotts, Belton, Crowle (Lincolnshire portion), Eastoft, Epworth, Keadby, Wroot.	Remainder of PLU in West Riding of Yorkshire.

== London ==
Link to 1910 map showing London PLUs; Link to 1928 map showing London PLUs

Name	Civil Parishes	Notes
Bermondsey PLP	St Mary Magdalen Bermondsey.	Abolished in 1868 and merged with St Olave PLU.
Bethnal Green PLP	St Matthew Bethnal Green.	
Camberwell PLP	St Giles Camberwell.	
Chelsea PLP	St Luke Chelsea + detached portion.	Created in 1841, previously part of Kensington PLU.
City of London PLU	All Hallows Barking + detached portion, All Hallows Bread Street, All Hallows Honey Lane, All Hallows Lombard Street, All Hallows on the Wall + detached portion, All Hallows Staining, All Hallows the Great, All Hallows the Less + detached portion, Barnard's Inn (added in 1869), Christ Church Greyfriars, Furnival's Inn (part) (added in 1869), Holy Trinity the Less, Precinct of Bridewell (added in 1869), Precinct of Whitefriars, Serjeant's Inn (added in 1869), St Alban Wood Street, St Alphage Cripplegate, St Andrew by the Wardrobe, St Andrew Holborn below the Bars (added in 1869), St Andrew Hubbard, St Andrew Undershaft, St Anne & St Agnes Aldersgate, St Anne Blackfriars, St Antholin Budge Row, St Augustine Watling Street, St Bartholomew by the Exchange, St Bartholomew the Great (added in 1869), St Bartholomew the Less (added in 1869), St Benet Fink, St Benet Gracechurch, St Benet Paul's Wharf, St Benet Sherehog, St Botolph by Billingsgate, St Botolph Without Aldersgate (added in 1869), St Botolph Without Aldgate (part) (added in 1869), St Botolph Without Bishopsgate (added in 1869), St Bride Fleet Street (added in 1869), St Christopher le Stocks, St Clement Eastcheap, St Dionis Backchurch, St Dunstan in the East, St Dunstan in the West (added in 1869), St Edmund the King & Martyr, St Ethelburga Bishopsgate, St Faith under St Paul's, St Gabriel Fenchurch Street, St George Botolph Lane, St Giles Without Cripplegate (added in 1869), St Gregory by St Paul's, St Helen Bishopsgate, St James Duke's Place, St James Garlickhythe, St John the Baptist upon Walbrook, St John the Evangelist Friday Street, St John Zachary, St Katherine Coleman, St Katherine Cree, St Lawrence Jewry, St Lawrence Pountney, St Leonard Eastcheap, St Leonard Foster Lane, St Magnus the Martyr, St Margaret Lothbury, St Margaret Moses, St Margaret New Fish Street, St Margaret Pattens, St Martin Ludgate, St Martin Orgar, St Martin Outwich, St Martin Pomeroy, St Martin Vintry, St Mary Abchurch, St Mary Aldermanbury, St Mary Aldermary, St Mary at Hill, St Mary Bothaw, St Mary Colechurch, St Mary le Bow, St Mary Magdalene Milk Street, St Mary Magdalene Old Fish Street, St Mary Mounthaw, St Mary Somerset, St Mary Staining, St Mary Whitechapel (part) (added in 1869), St Mary Woolchurch Haw, St Mary Woolnoth, St Matthew Friday Street, St Michael Bassishaw, St Michael Cornhill, St Michael Crooked Lane, St Michael le Querne, St Michael Paternoster Royal, St Michael Queenhithe, St Michael Wood Street, St Mildred Bread Street, St Mildred Poultry, St Nicholas Acons, St Nicholas Cole Abbey, St Nicholas Olave, St Olave Hart Street, St Olave Old Jewry, St Olave Silver Street, St Pancras Soper Lane, St Peter Cornhill, St Peter le Poer, St Peter Paul's Wharf, St Peter Westcheap, St Sepulchre Without Newgate (added in 1869), St Stephen Coleman Street, St Stephen Walbrook, St Swithin London Stone, St Thomas the Apostle, St Vedast Foster Lane, Thavie's Inn (added in 1869).	
City of Westminster PLU	Close of Collegiate Church of St Peter, Liberty of the Rolls, Precinct of the Savoy, St Anne Soho, St Clement Danes + 2 detached portions, St George Hanover Square + detached portion, St James Piccadilly, St Margaret & St John the Evangelist Westminster + detached portion, St Martin in the Fields, St Mary le Strand, St Paul Covent Garden.	Created in 1913 by merging St George's, Strand and Westminster PLUs.
Clerkenwell PLU	St James Clerkenwell + detached portion, St John Clerkenwell.	Abolished in 1869 and merged with Holborn PLU.
East London PLU	St Botolph Without Aldersgate, St Botolph Without Aldgate (part), St Botolph Without Bishopsgate, St Giles Without Cripplegate, St Mary Whitechapel (part).	Abolished in 1869 and merged with City of London PLU.
Fulham PLU/PLP	Fulham, Hammersmith (until 1899).	Created in 1845, previously part of Kensington PLU.
Greenwich PLU	Greenwich, St Nicholas Deptford, St Paul Deptford, Woolwich (until 1868).	
Hackney PLU	St John at Hackney, Stoke Newington + detached portion.	
Hammersmith PLP	Hammersmith.	Created in 1899, previously part of Fulham PLU.
Hampstead PLP	St John Hampstead.	Created in 1848, previously part of Edmonton PLU in Middlesex.
Holborn PLU	Charterhouse, Furnival's Inn (part), Gray's Inn, Liberty of Glasshouse Yard, Liberty of Saffron Hill, Hatton Garden, Ely Rents & Ely Place, Lincoln's Inn, St Andrew Holborn above the Bars & St George the Martyr, St Giles in the Fields & St George Bloomsbury (added in 1914), St James Clerkenwell + detached portion (added in 1869), St John Clerkenwell (added in 1869), St Luke Middlesex (added in 1869), St Sepulchre Middlesex (added in 1845), Staple Inn.	
Islington PLP	St Mary Islington.	
Kensington PLU/PLP	Fulham (until 1845), Hammersmith (until 1845), Paddington (until 1845), St Luke Chelsea + detached portion (until 1841), St Mary Abbotts Kensington + detached portion.	
Lambeth PLP	Lambeth Palace, St Mary Lambeth.	
Lewisham PLU	Charlton (until 1868), Eltham, Kidbroke + detached portion (until 1868), Lee, Lewisham, Mottingham (until 1887), Plumstead (until 1868).	
Marylebone PLP	St Marylebone.	
Mile End PLP	Mile End Old Town.	Created in 1857, previously part of Stepney PLU. Abolished in 1925 and merged back with Stepney PLU.
Newington PLP	St Mary Newington.	Abolished in 1868 and merged with St Saviour's PLU.
Paddington PLP	Paddington.	Created in 1845, previously part of Kensington PLU.
Poplar PLU	All Saints Poplar, St Leonard Bromley, St Mary Stratford le Bow.	
Rotherhithe PLP	St Mary Rotherhithe.	Abolished in 1868 and merged with St Olave PLU.
Shoreditch PLP	St Leonard Shoreditch.	
St George's PLU	Close of Collegiate Church of St Peter, St George Hanover Square + detached portion, St Margaret & St John the Evangelist Westminster + detached portion.	Created in 1870. Abolished in 1913, and became part of the new City of Westminster PLU.
St George in the East PLP	St George in the East.	Abolished in 1925 and merged with Stepney PLU.
St George Hanover Square PLP	St George Hanover Square + detached portion.	Abolished in 1870, and became part of the new St George's PLU.
St George's Southwark PLP	St George the Martyr Southwark.	Abolished in 1868 and merged with St Saviour's PLU.
St Giles PLP	St Giles in the Fields & St George Bloomsbury.	Abolished in 1914 and merged with Holborn PLU.
St Luke's PLP	St Luke Middlesex.	Abolished in 1869 and merged with Holborn PLU.
St Margaret & St John Westminster PLP	Close of Collegiate Church of St Peter, St Margaret & St John the Evangelist Westminster + detached portion.	Abolished in 1870, and became part of the new St George's PLU.
St Martin's PLP	St Martin in the Fields.	Abolished in 1868, and merged with Strand PLU.
St Olave PLU	St John Horsleydown Southwark, St Mary Magdalen Bermondsey (added in 1868), St Mary Rotherhithe (added in 1868), St Olave Southwark, St Thomas Southwark.	Renamed Bermondsey PLU in 1904.
St Pancras PLP	St Pancras.	
St Saviour's PLU	Christchurch Southwark, St George the Martyr Southwark (added in 1868), St Mary Newington (added in 1868), St Saviour Southwark.	Renamed Southwark PLU in 1901.
Stepney PLU	Mile End Old Town (until 1857; added back in 1925), Ratcliff, St Anne Limehouse, St John of Wapping, St Paul Shadwell.	
Strand PLU	Liberty of the Rolls, Precinct of the Savoy, St Anne Soho (until 1868), St Clement Danes + 2 detached portions, St Martin in the Fields (added in 1868), St Mary le Strand, St Paul Covent Garden.	Abolished in 1913, and became part of the new City of Westminster PLU.
Wandsworth & Clapham PLU	Clapham + detached portion, Putney, St Mary Battersea, Streatham + detached portion, Tooting Graveney, Wandsworth.	Renamed Wandsworth PLU in 1904.
West London PLU	Barnard's Inn, Furnival's Inn (part), Precinct of Bridewell, Serjeant's Inn, St Andrew Holborn below the Bars, St Bartholomew the Great, St Bartholomew the Less, St Bride Fleet Street, St Dunstan in the West, St Sepulchre Without Newgate, Thavie's Inn.	Abolished in 1869 and merged with City of London PLU.
Westminster PLU	St Anne Soho, St James Piccadilly.	Created in 1868. Abolished in 1913, and became part of the new City of Westminster PLU.
Whitechapel PLU	Christchurch Spitalfields, Great Tower Hill, Holy Trinity Minories, Liberty of Norton Folgate, Mile End New Town, Old Artillery Ground, Precinct of Old Tower Without, Precinct of St Katharine's by the Tower, St Botolph Without Aldgate (part), St Mary Whitechapel (part), Tower of London.	Abolished in 1925 and merged with Stepney PLU.
Woolwich PLU	Charlton, Kidbroke + detached portion, Plumstead, Woolwich.	Created in 1868, previously part of Greenwich PLU and Lewisham PLU.

== Middlesex ==
Link to 1888 map showing Middlesex PLUs; Link to 1909 map showing Middlesex PLUs; Link to 1921 map showing Middlesex PLUs

Name	Civil Parishes	Notes
Barnet PLU	Enfield (detached portion), Finchley, Friern Barnet, Monken Hadley, South Mimms.	Remainder of PLU in Hertfordshire.
Brentford PLU	Acton, Chiswick, Ealing, Greenford, Hanwell, Heston, Isleworth, New Brentford, Northolt (detached portion), Perivale, Twickenham, Twyford.	
Edmonton PLU	Edmonton, Enfield, Hornsey + 2 detached portions, Southgate (created in 1894), St John Hampstead (until 1848), Tottenham, Wood Green (created in 1894).	Remainder of PLU in Essex & Hertfordshire.
Hendon PLU	Edgware, Great Stanmore, Harrow on the Hill, Harrow Weald (created in 1894), Hendon, Kingsbury, Little Stanmore, Pinner, Wealdstone (created in 1894), Wembley (created in 1894), Willesden (until 1896).	
Kingston upon Thames PLU	Hampton, Hampton Wick (created in 1866), Teddington.	Remainder of PLU in Surrey.
Staines PLU	Ashford, Cranford, East Bedfont, Feltham, Hanworth, Harlington, Harmondsworth, Laleham, Littleton, Shepperton, Staines, Stanwell, Sunbury.	
Uxbridge PLU	Cowley, Harefield, Hayes, Hillingdon, Ickenham, Northolt, Norwood, Ruislip, Uxbridge, West Drayton.	
Willesden PLP	Willesden.	Created in 1896, previously part of Hendon PLU.

== Norfolk ==
Link to 1888 map showing Norfolk PLUs; Link to 1910 map showing Norfolk PLUs; Link to 1929 map showing Norfolk PLUs

Name	Civil Parishes	Notes
Aylsham PLU	Alby with Thwaite, Aylsham, Banningham, Belaugh, Blickling, Brampton, Burgh-next-Aylsham, Buxton, Calthorpe, Cawston, Coleby, Coltishall, Corpusty, Erpingham, Foulsham, Great Hautbois, Guestwick, Hackford, Hevingham, Heydon, Hindolveston, Ingworth, Irmingland, Itteringham, Lamas with Little Hautbois, Little Barningham, Mannington, Marsham, Oulton, Oxnead, Reepham with Kerdiston, Salle, Saxthorpe, Scottow, Skeyton, Stratton Strawless, Swanton Abbott, Themelthorpe, Thurning, Tuttington, Whitwell, Wickmere, Wolterton, Wood Dalling, Wood Norton.	
Blofield PLU	Acle + 3 detached portions, Beighton + detached portion, Blofield, Brundall, Buckenham, Burlingham St Andrew + detached portion, Burlingham St Edmund, Burlingham St Peter, Cantley, Freethorpe + detached portion, Great Plumstead, Halvergate, Hassingham, Hemblington, Limpenhoe, Lingwood, Little Plumstead, Moulton + detached portion, Postwick + detached portion, Ranworth with Panxworth, Reedham, Runham (detached portion), South Walsham St Lawrence + detached portion, South Walsham St Mary, Southwood, Strumpshaw, Thorpe next Norwich, Tunstall, Upton with Fishley, Wickhampton, Witton, Woodbastwick.	
Depwade PLU	Alburgh, Ashwellthorpe, Aslacton, Billingford, Brockdish, Bunwell, Burston, Carleton Rode, Denton, Dickleburgh, Diss, Earsham, Forncett St Mary, Forncett St Peter, Fritton, Fundenhall, Gissing, Hapton, Hardwick, Hempnall, Morning Thorpe, Moulton St Michael, Needham, Pulham St Mary Magdalene, Pulham St Mary the Virgin, Redenhall with Harleston, Rushall, Scole, Shelton, Shimpling, Starston, Stratton St Mary, Stratton St Michael, Tacolneston, Tasburgh, Tharston, Thelveton, Thorpe Abbots, Tibenham, Tivetshall St Margaret, Tivetshall St Mary, Wacton, Wortwell.	
Docking PLU	Anmer, Bagthorpe, Barmer, Bircham Newton, Bircham Tofts, Brancaster, Broomsthorpe, Burnham Deepdale, Burnham Norton, Burnham Overy, Burnham Sutton, Burnham Thorpe, Burnham Westgate, Choseley, Dersingham, Docking, East Rudham, Fring, Great Bircham, Heacham, Holme-next-the-Sea, Houghton, Hunstanton, Ingoldisthorpe, North Creake, Ringstead, Sedgeford, Shernborne, Snettisham, South Creake, Syderstone, Thornham, Titchwell, Waterden, West Rudham.	
Downham PLU	Barton Bendish, Bexwell, Boughton, Crimplesham, Denver, Downham Market, Fincham, Fordham, Hilgay, Marham, Roxham, Runcton Holme, Ryston, Shouldham, Shouldham Thorpe, South Runcton, Southery, Stoke Ferry, Stow Bardolph, Stradsett, Tottenhill, Wallington cum Thorpland, Watlington, Welney (Norfolk portion), Wereham, West Dereham, Wiggenhall St Germans, Wiggenhall St Mary Magdalen, Wiggenhall St Mary the Virgin + detached portion, Wiggenhall St Peter, Wimbotsham, Wormegay, Wretton.	Remainder of PLU in Cambridgeshire.
East & West Flegg PLU	Ashby with Oby, Burgh St Margaret + detached portion, Caister next Yarmouth, Clippesby, East Somerton, Filby, Hemsby, Martham, Mautby, Ormesby St Margaret with Scratby, Ormesby St Michael's, Repps with Bastwick, Rollesby, Runham, Stokesby with Herringby, Thrigby, Thurne, West Somerton, Winterton.	
Ely PLU	Redmere.	Remainder of PLU in Cambridgeshire.
Erpingham PLU	Aldborough, Antingham, Aylmerton, Baconthorpe, Beeston Regis, Bessingham, Bodham, Briston, Cley next the Sea, Cromer, East Beckham, Edgefield, Felbrigg, Gimingham, Glandford with Sayfield, Gresham, Gunton, Hanworth, Hempstead, Holt, Hunworth, Kelling, Knapton, Letheringsett, Matlask, Metton, Mundesley, North Barningham, Northrepps, Overstrand, Plumstead, Roughton, Runton, Salthouse, Sheringham, Sidestrand, Southrepps, Stody, Suffield, Sustead, Thornage, Thorpe Market, Thurgarton, Town Barningham, Trimingham, Trunch, West Beckham, Weybourne.	
Forehoe PLU	Barnham Broom, Bawburgh, Bowthorpe, Brandon Parva, Carleton Forehoe, Colton Barford, Costessey, Coston, Crownthorpe, Deopham, Easton, Hackford, Hingham, Kimberley, Marlingford, Morley St Botolph, Morley St Peter, Runhall, Welborne, Wicklewood, Wramplingham, Wymondham or Wyndham.	
Freebridge Lynn PLU	Ashwicken, Babingley, Bawsey, Castle Acre, Castle Rising, Congham, East Walton, East Winch, Flitcham cum Appleton, Gayton, Gayton Thorpe, Gaywood, Great Massingham, Grimston, Harpley, Hillington, Leziate, Little Massingham, Middleton, Mintlyn, North Runcton, North Wootton, Pentney, Roydon, Sandringham, Setchey, South Wootton, West Acre, West Bilney, West Newton, West Winch, Wolferton.	
Great Yarmouth PLP	Great Yarmouth (Norfolk portion).	Remainder of PLU in Suffolk.
Guiltcross PLU	Banham, Blo Norton, Bressingham, Bridgham, East Harling, Eccles, Fersfield, Garboldisham, Gasthorpe, Kenninghall, New Buckenham, North Lopham, Old Buckenham, Quidenham, Riddlesworth, Roydon, Shelfanger, South Lopham, West Harling, Wilby, Winfarthing.	
Henstead PLU	Bikley, Bracon Ash, Bramerton, Caistor St Edmund, Colney, Cringleford, Dunston, East Carleton, Flordon, Framingham Earl, Framingham Pigot, Great Melton, Hethel, Hethersett, Holverston, Intwood, Keswick, Ketteringham, Kirby Bedon, Little Melton, Markshall, Mulbarton, Newton Flotman, Poringland, Rockland St Mary, Saxlingham Thorpe & Saxlingham Nethergate, Shotesham All Saints, Shotesham St Mary, Stoke Holy Cross, Surlingham, Swainsthorpe, Swardeston, Trowse with Newton, Whitlingham, Wreningham.	
Holbeach PLU	Central Wingland (Norfolk portion).	Remainder of PLU in Lincolnshire.
King's Lynn PLU	North Lynn, South Lynn, St Margaret King's Lynn, West Lynn.	
Loddon & Clavering PLU	Aldeby, Alpington, Ashby, Bedingham, Brooke, Broome, Bergh Apton, Burgh St Peter, Carleton St Peter, Chedgrave + 2 detached portions, Claxton, Ditchingham, Ellingham, Geldeston, Gillingham, Haddiscoe, Hales, Hardley, Heckingham, Hedenham, Hellington, Howe, Kirby Cane, Kirstead, Langley+ detached portion, Loddon + detached portion, Mundham, Norton Subcourse, Raveningham + 2 detached portions, Seething, Sisland, Stockton + 5 detached portions, Thorpe next Haddiscoe, Thurlton, Thurton, Thwaite, Toft Monks + 2 detached portions, Topcroft, Wheatacre, Woodton, Norfolk, Yelverton.	
Mitford & Launditch PLU	Bawdeswell, Beeston with Bittering + detached portion, Beetley, Billingford, Bintree, Brisley, Bylaugh, Colkirk, Cranworth, East Bilney, East Dereham, East Lexham, East Tuddenham, Elsing, Foxley, Garvestone, Gateley, Great Dunham, Great Fransham, Gressenhall, Guist, Hardingham, Hockering, Hoe, Horningtoft, Kempstone, Letton, Litcham, Little Dunham, Little Fransham, Longham, Lyng, Mattishall, Mattishall Burgh, Mileham, North Elmham, North Tuddenham, Oxwick & Pattesley, Reymerstone, Rougham, Scarning, Shipdham, Southburgh, Sparham, Stanfield, Swanton Morley, Thuxton, Tittleshall, Twyford, Weasenham All Saints, Weasenham St Peter, Wellingham, Wendling, West Lexham, Westfield, Whinburgh, Whissonsett, Woodrising, Worthing, Norfolk, Yaxham.	
Mutford & Lothingland PLU	Gorleston (Norfolk portion).	Remainder of PLU in Suffolk.
Norwich PLU	All Saints Norwich, Earlham, Eaton, Hamlet of Hellesdon, Lakenham, North Heigham, Pockthorpe, South Heigham, St Andrew Norwich, St Augustine Norwich, St Benedict Norwich, St Clement Norwich, St Edmund Norwich, St Etheldred Norwich, St George at Colegate Norwich, St George of Tombland Norwich, St Giles Norwich, St Gregory Norwich, St Helen Norwich, St James Norwich, St John de Sepulchre Norwich, St John of Maddermarket Norwich, St John of Timberhill Norwich, St Julian Norwich, St Lawrence Norwich, St Margate Norwich, St Martin at Oak Norwich, St Martin at Palace Norwich, St Mary at Coslany Norwich, St Mary in the Marsh Norwich, St Michael at Coslany Norwich, St Michael at Plea Norwich, St Michael at Thorn Norwich, St Peter Hungate Norwich, St Peter of Mancroft Norwich, St Peter per Mountergate Norwich, St Peter Southgate Norwich, St Saviour Norwich, St Simon & St Jude Norwich, St Stephen Norwich, St Swithin Norwich, Thorpe, Town Close Norwich, Trowse Millgate Carrow & Bracondale.	
Smallburgh PLU	Ashmanhaugh, Bacton, Barton Turf, Beeston St Lawrence, Bradfield, Brumstead, Catfield, Crostwight, Dilham, East Ruston, Edingthorpe, Felmingham, Happisburgh, Hempstead with Eccles, Hickling, Honing, Horning, Horsey, Hoveton St John, Hoveton St Peter, Ingham, Norfolk, Irstead, Lessingham, Ludham, Neatishead, North Walsham, Palling, Paston, Potter Heigham, Ridlington, Sco Ruston, Sloley, Smallburgh, Stalham, Sutton, Swafield, Tunstead, Walcott, Waxham, Westwick, Witton, Worstead.	
St Faith's PLU	Attlebridge, Beeston St Andrew, Booton, Brandiston, Catton, Crostwick, Drayton, Felthorpe, Frettenham + detached portion, Great Witchingham, Hainford, Haveringland, Honingham, Horsford, Horsham St Faith with Newton St Faith, Horstead with Stanninghall, Little Witchingham, Morton on the Hill, Rackheath, Ringland, Salhouse, Spixworth, Sprowston, Swannington, Taverham, Weston Longville, Wroxham.	
Swaffham PLU	Ashill, Beechamwell, Bodney, Buckenham Tofts, Caldecote, Cockley Cley, Colveston, Didlington, East Bradenham, Foulden, Gooderstone, Great Cressingham, Hilborough, Holme Hale, Houghton on the Hill, Ickburgh, Langford, Little Cressingham, Narborough, Narford, Necton, Newton by Castle Acre, North Pickenham, Oxborough, Saham Toney, Shingham, South Acre, South Pickenham, Sporle with Palgrave, Stanford, Swaffham, Threxton, West Bradenham.	
Thetford PLU	Brandon (Norfolk portion), Brettenham, Cranwich, Croxton, East Wretham, Feltwell, Feltwell Anchor, Great & Little Snarehill, Hockwold cum Wilton, Kilverstone, Lynford, Methwold, Mundford, Northwold, Rushford (Norfolk portion), Santon, Sturston, Thetford St Cuthbert (Norfolk portion) + 2 detached portions, Thetford St Mary (Norfolk portion) + detached portion, Thetford St Peter, Weeting with Bromehill, West Tofts, West Wretham.	Remainder of PLU in Suffolk.
Walsingham PLU	Alethorpe, Bale, Barney, Binham, Blakeney, Briningham, Brinton, Cockthorpe, Dunton-cum-Doughton, East Barsham, East Raynham, Egmere, Fakenham, Field Dalling, Fulmodeston cum Croxton, Great Ryburgh, Great Snoring, Great Walsingham, Gunthorpe, Helhoughton, Hempton, Hindringham, Holkham, Houghton St Giles, Kettlestone, Little Ryburgh, Little Snoring, Little Walsingham, Melton Constable, Morston, North Barsham, Pensthorpe, Pudding Norton, Quarles, Saxlingham, Sculthorpe, Sharrington, South Raynham, Stibbard, Stiffkey, Swanton Novers, Tatterford, Tattersett, Testerton, Thursford, Tofttrees, Warham All Saints, Warham St Mary, Wells next the Sea, West Barsham, West Raynham, Wighton, Wiveton.	
Wayland PLU	Attleborough, Besthorpe, Breckles, Carbrooke, Caston, Great Ellingham, Griston, Hargham, Hockham, Illington, Larling, Little Ellingham, Merton, Ovington, Rockland All Saints, Rockland St Andrew, Rockland St Peter, Roudham, Scoulton, Shropham, Snetterton, Stow Bedon, Thompson, Tottington, Watton.	
Wisbech PLU	Clenchwarton + detached portion, Emneth + detached portion, Outwell, Terrington St Clement + 4 detached portions, Terrington St John + 2 detached portions, Tilney All Saints + 3 detached portions, Tilney cum Islington, Tilney St Lawrence + 3 detached portions, Upwell, Walpole St Andrew, Walpole St Peter + 3 detached portions, Walsoken + 2 detached portions, West Walton + 3 detached portions.	Remainder of PLU in Cambridgeshire.

== Northamptonshire and Soke of Peterborough ==
Link to 1888 map showing Northamptonshire PLUs; Link to 1909 map showing Northamptonshire PLUs; Link to 1929 map showing Northamptonshire PLUs

Name	Civil Parishes	Notes
Banbury PLU	Appletree, Aston le Walls, Chalcombe, Chipping Warden, Edgcote, Lower Bodington, Middleton Cheney, Upper Bodington, Warkworth.	Remainder of PLU in Oxfordshire & Warwickshire.
Brackley PLU	Aynho, Brackley St Peter, Croughton, Culworth, Evenley, Eydon, Falcott cum Astwell, Farthinghoe, Greatworth, Helmdon, Hinton in the Hedges, King's Sutton with Newbottle, Marston St Lawrence, Moreton Pinkney, Radstone, Steane, Stuchbury, Sulgrave, Syresham, Thenford, Thorpe Mandeville, Whitfield.	Remainder of PLU in Buckinghamshire & Oxfordshire.
Brixworth PLU	Althorp, Boughton, Brington, Brixworth, Chapel Brampton, Church Brampton, Cold Ashby, Coton, Cottesbrooke, Draughton, East Haddon, Faxton, Great Creaton, Guilsborough, Hanging Houghton, Hannington, Harlestone, Haselbech, Holcot, Holdenby, Hollowell, Lamport, Maidwell, Mawsley, Moulton, Moulton Park, Naseby, Old, Overstone, Pitsford, Ravensthorpe, Scaldwell, Spratton, Teeton, Thornby, Walgrave.	
Daventry PLU	Ashby St Ledgers, Badby + 2 detached portions, Braunston, Brockhall, Byfield, Canons Ashby, Catesby, Charwelton, Daventry, Dodford, Everdon, Farthingstone, Fawsley, Floore, Hellidon, Long Buckby, Newnham + detached portion, Norton, Preston Capes, Staverton, Stowe Nine Churches, Undivided Lands, Watford, Weedon Beck, Welton, West Haddon, Whilton, Winwick, Woodford cum Membris.	
Hardingstone PLU	Brafield on the Green, Castle Ashby, Cogenhoe, Collingtree, Courteenhall, Denton, Great Houghton, Hackleton, Hardingstone, Horton, Little Houghton, Milton, Piddington, Preston Deanery, Quinton, Roade, Rothersthorpe, Whiston, Wootton, Yardley Hastings.	
Kettering PLU	Barford, Barton Seagrave, Beanfield Lawns, Broughton, Burton Latimer, Corby, Cottingham, Cranford St Andrew, Cranford St John, Cransley, Desborough, East Carlton, Geddington, Glendon, Grafton Underwood, Great Oakley, Harrington, Kettering, Little Oakley, Loddington, Middleton, Newton, Orton, Pytchley, Rothwell, Rushton, Stanion, Thorpe Malsor, Warkton, Weekley.	
Lutterworth PLU	Welford.	Remainder of PLU in Leicestershire & Warwickshire.
Market Harborough PLU	Arthingworth, Ashley, Brampton Ash, Braybrooke, Clipston, Dingley, East Farndon, Great Oxendon, Hothorpe, Kelmarsh, Little Bowden, Marston Trussell, Sibbertoft, Stoke Albany, Sulby, Sutton Bassett, Thorpe Lubenham, Weston by Welland, Wilbarston.	Remainder of PLU in Leicestershire.
Newport Pagnell PLU	Hanslop (Northamptonshire portion).	Remainder of PLU in Buckinghamshire.
Northampton PLU	Abington, All Saints Northampton, Bugbrooke, Dallington, Duston, Great Billing, Harpole, Kingsthorpe, Kislingbury, Little Billing, Nether Heyford, Priory of St Andrew Northampton, St Giles Northampton, St Peter Northampton, St Sepulchre Northampton, Upper Heyford, Upton, Weston Favell.	
Oundle PLU	Apethorpe, Armston, Ashton, Barnwell All Saints, Barnwell St Andrew, Benefield, Blatherwycke, Bulwick, Cotterstock, Deene, Deenethorpe, Fotheringhay, Glapthorn, Great Weldon, Hemington, King's Cliffe, Lilford cum Wigsthorpe, Little Weldon, Luddington (Northamptonshire portion), Lutton (Northamptonshire portion), Nassington, Oundle, Pilton, Polebrook, Southwick, Stoke Doyle, Tansor, Thorpe Achurch, Thurning (Northamptonshire portion), Wadenhoe, Warmington, Winwick (Northamptonshire portion), Woodnewton, Yarwell.	Remainder of PLU in Huntingdonshire.
Peterborough PLU	Ailsworth, Borough Fen, Castor, Deeping Gate, Etton, Eye, Glinton, Gunthorpe, Helpston, Marholm, Maxey, Minster Precincts Peterborough, Newborough, Northborough, Paston, Peakirk, St John the Baptist Peterborough, Sutton, Upton, Walton, Werrington.	Remainder of PLU in Cambridgeshire, Huntingdonshire & Lincolnshire.
Potterspury PLU	Alderton, Ashton, Cosgrove, Furtho, Grapton Regis, Hartwell, Passenham, Paulerspury, Potterspury, Potterspury Lodge Farm (Undivided Land), Whittlewood Forest (Undivided Land), Wicken, Yardley Gobion.	Remainder of PLU in Buckinghamshire.
Rugby PLU	Barby, Claycoton, Crick, Elkington, Kilsby, Lilbourne, Stanford, Yelvertoft.	Remainder of PLU in Leicestershire & Warwickshire.
Southam PLU	Stoneton.	Remainder of PLU in Warwickshire.
Stamford PLU	Bainton, Barnack, Colly Weston, Duddington, Easton on the Hill, Southorpe, St Martin Stamford Baron, Thornhaugh, Ufford, Wansford, Wittering, Wothorpe.	Remainder of PLU in Huntingdonshire, Lincolnshire & Rutland.
Thrapston PLU	Aldwinkle St Peter, Brigstock, Chelveston cum Caldecott, Clapton, Denford, Great Addington, Hargrave, Islip, Little Addington, Lowick, Raunds, Ringstead, Slipton, Stanwick, Sudborough, Thrapston, Titchmarsh, Twywell, Woodford.	Remainder of PLU in Huntingdonshire.
Towcester PLU	Abthorpe, Adstone, Blakesley, Blisworth, Bradden, Cold Higham, Easton Neston, Gayton, Green's Norton, Litchborough, Maidford, Pattishall, Plumpton, Shutlanger, Silverstone, Slapton, Stoke Bruerne, Tiffield, Towcester, Wappenham, Weedon Lois, Whittlebury, Woodend.	
Uppingham PLU	Fineshade, Gretton, Harringworth, Laxton, Rockingham, Wakerley.	Remainder of PLU in Leicestershire & Rutland.
Wellingborough PLU	Bozeat, Earls Barton, Easton Maudit, Ecton, Finedon, Great Doddington, Great Harrowden, Grendon, Hardwick, Higham Ferrers, Higham Park, Irchester, Irthlingborough, Isham, Little Harrowden, Mears Ashby, Newton Bromswold, Orlingbury, Rushden, Strixton, Sywell, Wellingborough, Wilby, Wollaston.	Remainder of PLU in Bedfordshire.

== Northumberland ==
Link to 1888 map showing Northumberland PLUs; Link to 1906 map showing Northumberland PLUs; Link to 1930 map showing Northumberland PLUs

Name	Civil Parishes	Notes
Alnwick PLU	Abberwick, Acklington, Acklington Park, Acton & Old Felton, Alnmouth + 3 detached portions & 1 detached island, Alnwick, Amble + 3 ½ detached islands, Bassington, Beanley, Birling + 3 ½ detached islands, Bolton, Broompark, Brotherwick, Broxfield, Brunton, Craster, Crawley, Ditchburn, Doxford, Dunston, Edlingham, Eglingham, Elyhaugh, Embleton, Fallodon, Felton, Glanton, Gloster Hill, Greens & Glantlees, Guizance, Harehope, Hauxley + detached island, Hazon & Hartlaw, Hedgeley, High Buston, Howick, Learchild, Lemmington, Lesbury + detached portion, Little Houghton, Long Houghton, Low Buston, Morwick, Newton by the Sea, Newton on the Moor, North Charlton, Rennington, Rock, Shawdon & Woodhouse, Shilbottle, Shipley, South Charlton, Stamford, Sturton Grange, Swarland, Titlington, Togston, Walkmill, Warkworth, Whittle, Woodhouse.	
Belford PLU	Adderstone, Bamburgh, Bamburgh Castle, Beadnell, Belford, Bradford, Budle, Burton, Chathill, Detchant, Easington, Easington Grange, Elford, Ellingham, Elwick, Fleetham, Glororum, Lucker, Middleton, Monks’ House, Mousen, Newham, Newstead, North Sunderland, Outchester, Preston, Ratchwood, Ross + detached island, Shoreston, Spindleston, Swinhoe, Tuggal, Warenton, Warneford.	
Bellingham PLU	Bellingham, Birtley, Carrycoats, Catcherside, Chirdon, Coldwell, Corsenside, Crookdean, Fawns, Great Bavington, Hawick, Kirkharle, Kirkwhelpington, Little Bavington, Little Harle, Otterburn, Plashetts, Rochester Ward, Smalesmouth, Sweethope, Tarset, Thockrington, Thorneyburn, Troughend, Wark, Wellhaugh, West Harle, West Whelpington.	
Berwick upon Tweed PLU	Ancroft, Berwick upon Tweed, Cornhill, Duddo, Felkington, Grindon, Holy Island, Horncliffe, Kyloe, Loan End, Longridge, Norham, Norham Mains, Shoreswood, Thornton, Tweedmouth, Twizell.	
Castle Ward PLU	Belsay, Berwick Hill, Bitchfield, Black Callerton, Black Heddon, Bolam, Bolam Vicarage, Bradford, Brenkley, Capheaton, Cheeseburn Grange, Coldcoats, Coxlodge, Dalton, Darras Hall, Dinnington, Eachwick, East Brunton, East Denton, East Heddon, East Matfen, East Shaftoe, Fawdon, Gallowhill, Harlow Hill, Harnham, Hawkwell, Heddon on the Wall, Heugh, High Callerton, Higham Dykes, Horton Grange, Houghton & Close House, Ingoe, Kearsley, Kenton, Kirkheaton, Kirkley, Little Callerton, Mason + detached portion, Milburn, Milburn Grange, Nesbitt, Newbiggin, Newburn + detached portion, Newburn Hall, Newham, North Dissington, North Gosforth, Ogle, Ouston, Ponteland, Prestwick, Prestwick Carr (Intermixed), Riplington, Rudchester, Ryall, Shilvington, Shortflatt, South Dissington, South Gosforth, Stannington, Sugley, Throckley, Trewick, Twizell, Wallbottle, Wallridge, West Brunton, West Denton, West Heddon, West Matfen, West Shaftoe, Whalton, Whitchester, Whorlton East & West, Woolsington.	
Glendale PLU	Akeld, Brandon, Branton, Branxton, Carham, Chatton, Chillingham, Coldsmouth & Thompson's Walls, Coupland, Crookhouse, Doddington, Earle, East Lilburn, Ewart, Fawdon & Clinch, Ford, Grey's Forest, Heathpool, Hepburn, Howtel, Humbleton, Ilderton, Ingram, Linhope, Greenshawhill & Hartside, Kilham, Kirknewton, Lanton, Lowick, Middleton Hall, Milfield, Nesbit, New Bewick, Newtown, North Middleton, Old Bewick, Paston, Plea Piece common to East & West Lilburn, Ilderton and Roseden, Reaveley, Roddam, Roseden, Selby's Forest, South Middleton, Undivided Moor common to Coldsmouth & Thompson's Walls, Grey's Forest and Westnewton + detached portion, West Lilburn, Westnewton, Wooler, Wooperton, Yeavering.	
Haltwhistle PLU	Bellister, Blenkinsopp, Coanwood, Featherstone, Haltwhistle, Hartleyburn, Henshaw, Kirkhaugh, Knaresdale, Lambley, Melkridge, Ridley, Thirlwall, Thoen Grafton, Walltown, Whitfield.	
Hexham PLU	Allendale, Aydon, Aydon Castle, Bearl, Bingfield, Blanchland, Broomhaugh, Broomley, Bywell, Chollerton, Clarewood, Cocklaw, Corbridge, Dilstob, Dukes Hagg, Eltringham, Espershields, Fallowfield, Great Whittington, Hallington, Halton, Haughton + detached portion, Haydon, Healey, Hexham, High Fotherley, High Quarter Hexham, Horsley, Humshaugh, Black Carts & Rye Hill + detached portion, Little Whittington, Low Quarter Hexham, Mickley, Middle Quarter Hexham, Nafferton, Newbrough, Newlands, Newton, Newton Hall, Ovingham, Ovington, Portgate, Prudhoe, Prudhoe Castle, Riding, Sandhoe, Shotley Low Quarter, Simondburn, Slaley, Spital, Stelling, Stinted Pasture common to West Quarter Hexham, Middle Quarter Hexham, High Quarter Hexham and Hexham + 2 detached portions, Styford, Thornbrough, Wall, Warden, Welton, West Acombe, West Quarter Hexham + 2 detached portions, Whittle, Whittonstall, Wylam.	
Morpeth PLU	Ashington & Sheepwash, Bedlington, Benridge, Bigge's Quarter + 6 detached portions, Bockenfield, Bothal Demesne, Bullocks Hall, Cambo, Causey Park, Cockle Park, Corridge, Cresswell, Deanham, Earsdon, Earson Forest, East & West Thirston with Shothaugh, East Chevington, East Thornton, Edington, Ellington, Eshott, Fenrother, Freeholders’ Quarter + 5 detached portions, Hadston, Hartburn, Hartburn Grange, Hebron, Hepscott, High & Low Highlaws, High Angerton, Highlaws, Hirst, Horsley Moor common to Bigge's Quarter, Fenrother, Freeholders’ Quarter and Riddell's Quarter, Longhirst, Longshaws, Longwitton, Low Angerton, Lynmouth, Meldon, Mitford, Molesdon, Morpeth, Morpeth Castle, Catchburn, Stoshill & Park House, Netherwitton, Netherwitton, Newbiggin, Newminster Abbey, Newton Park, Newton Underwood, North Middleton, North Seaton, Nunriding, Old Moor, Pegswood, Pigdon, Riddell's Quarter + 3 detached portions, Rivergreen, South Middleton, Spital Hill, Stanton, Throphill, Todridge, Tranwell & High Church, Tritlington, Ulgham, Undivided Lands to Bigge's Quarter, Freeholders’ Quarter and Riddell's Quarter + detached portion, Wallington Demesne, West Chevington, West Thornton, Whitridge, Widdrington, Witton Shields, Woodhorn, Woodhorn Demesne.	
Newcastle upon Tyne PLU	All Saints Newcastle upon Tyne, Benwell, Byker, Elswick, Fenham, Heaton, Jesmond, St Andrew Newcastle upon Tyne, St John Newcastle upon Tyne, St Nicholas Newcastle upon Tyne, Westgate Newcastle upon Tyne.	
Rothbury PLU	Alnham, Alwinton, Barrow, Bickerton, Brinkburn High Ward, Brinkburn Low Ward, Brinkburn South Side, Burradon, Caistron, Callaly & Yetlington, Cartington + detached portion, Clennell, Coatyards, Debdon + detached portion, Diddlestone, Dueshill + detached portion, Elsdon, Ewesley, Fairhaugh, Fairnley, Fallowlees, Farnham, Flotterton, Great Ryle + detached portion, Great Tosson & Wyehill, Green Leighton, Harbottle, Hartington, Hartington Hall, Harwood, Healey & Comb Hill, Hepple + 2 detached portions, Hepple Demesne, Hesleyhurst, High & Low Trewhitt, Hollinghill + detached portion, Holystone, Kidland, Lee Ward, Linbridge + detached portion, Linsheeles, Little Ryle, Little Tosson, Longframlington, Lorbottle, Monkridge, Mount Healey, Netherton North Side, Netherton South Side, Newtown, Nunnykirk, Pauperhaugh, Peels, Prendwick, Raw, Ritton Coltpark, Ritton White House, Rothbury (Intermixed), Rothley, Scrainwood, Sharperton, Snitter (Intermixed) + detached portion, Thropton, Todburn, Unthank, Warton, Whittingham, Whitton, Wingates, Woodside, Wreighill.	
Tynemouth PLU	Backworth, Bebside, Burradon, Chirton + 2 detached portions, Cowpen, Cramlington, Cullercoats, Earsdon, East Hartford, Hartley + detached island, Holywell, Horton, Long Benton, Monkseaton, Murton, Newsham & South Blyth, North Shields, Preston + 2 detached portions, Seaton Delaval, Seghill, Tynemouth, Wallsend, West Hartford, Whitley.	

== Nottinghamshire ==
Link to 1888 map showing Nottinghamshire PLUs; Link to 1909 map showing Nottinghamshire PLUs; Link to 1927 map showing Nottinghamshire PLUs

Name	Civil Parishes	Notes
Basford PLU	Annesley, Arnold, Barton in Fabis, Basford, Beeston, Bestwood Park, Bilborough, Bradmore, Bulwell, Bunny, Burton Joyce, Calverton, Carlton (part), Clifton with Glapton, Cossall, Cowlick, Eastwood, Felley, Gamston, Gedling, Gotham, Greasley, Hucknall Torkard, Kirkby in Ashfield, Lambley, Linby, Newstead, Nuthall + detached portion, Papplewick, Ruddington, Selston, Stoke Bardolph, Strelley, Thrumpton, Trowell, West Bridgford + detached portion, Wilford, Wollaton, Woodborough.	Remainder of PLU in Derbyshire.
Bingham PLU	Aslocton, Bingham, Carcolston, Clipston, Colston Basset, Cotgrave, Cropwell Bishop + detached portion, Cropwell Butler, East Bridgford, Edwalton, Elton, Flawborough, Flintham, Granby, Hawksworth + detached portion, Hickling, Holme Pierrepont, Keyworth, Kinoulton, Kneeton, Langar, Lodge on the Wolds, Normanton on the Wolds, Orston, Owthorpe, Plumtree, Radcliffe on Trent, Saxondale, Scarrington, Screveton, Shelford, Shelton, Sibthorpe, Stanton on the Wolds, Thoroton, Tollerton, Tythby, Whatton, Widmerpool, Wiverton Hall.	Remainder of PLU in Leicestershire.
Doncaster PLU	Auckley (Nottinghamshire portion), Finningley, Misson.	Remainder of PLU in West Riding of Yorkshire.
East Retford PLU	Askham, Babworth, Barnby Moor + detached portion, Bevercotes, Bothamsall, Clarborough, Clayworth, Cottam, Darlton, Dunham, East Drayton, East Markham, East Retford, Eaton, Elksley, Everton, Fledborough, Gamston, Gringley on the Hill, Grove, Haughton, Hayton, Headon, Ilayton Smeath, Laneham, Littleborough, Lound, Markham Clinton, Marnham, Mattersey, Normanton upon Trent, North Leverton with Habblesthorpe, North Wheatley, Ordsall, Ragnall, Rampton, Ranskill, Scaftworth, Scrooby, South Leverton, South Wheatley, Stokeham, Sturton le Steeple, Sutton, Torworth, Treswell, Tuxford + detached portion, West Drayton, West Retford, Wiseton.	
Gainsborough PLU	Beckingham, Bole, Misterton, Saundby, Walkeringham, West Burton, West Stockwith.	Remainder of PLU in Lincolnshire.
Loughborough PLU	Costock, East Leake, Normanton upon Soar, Rempstone, Stanford upon Soar, Sutton Bonnington, Thorpe in the Glebe, West Leake, Willoughby on the Wolds, Wysall.	Remainder of PLU in Leicestershire.
Mansfield PLU	Blidworth, Bookholme, Fulwood, Haywood Oaks, Hucknall Huthwaite, Lindhurst, Mansfield, Mansfield Woodhouse, Pinxton (Nottinghamshire portion), Skegby, Sutton in Ashfield, Teversall, Warsop.	Remainder of PLU in Derbyshire.
Melton Mowbray PLU	Upper Broughton.	Remainder of PLU in Leicestershire.
Newark PLU	Alverton, Balderton, Barnby in the Willows, Besthorpe, Broadholme, Coddington, Cotham, Farndon, Girton, Harby, Hawton, Kilvington, Langford, Meering, Newark upon Trent, North Clifton, North Collingham, South Clifton, South Collingham, South Scarle, Spalford, Staunton, Thorney, Wigsley, Winthorpe.	Remainder of PLU in Lincolnshire.
Nottingham PLU	Brewhouse Yard Nottingham, Carlton (part), Lenton, Radford, Sneinton, St Mary Nottingham, St Nicholas Nottingham, St Peter Nottingham, Standard Hill.	
Shardlow PLU	Bramcote, Chilwell, Kingston upon Soar, Ratcliffe upon Soar, Stapleford, Toton.	Remainder of PLU in Derbyshire & Leicestershire.
Southwell PLU	Averham, Bathley, Bilsthorpe, Bleasby, Boughton, Budby, Carlton on Trent, Caunton, Cromwell, Eakring, East Stoke, Edingley, Edwinstowe, Egmanton, Elston, Epperstone, Farnsfield, Fiskerton cum Morton, Gonalston, Grassthorpe, Halam, Halloughton, Hockerton, Holme, Hoveringham, Kelham, Kersall, Kirklington, Kirton, Kneesall, Laxton, Lipstone, Lowdham Caythorpe & Gunthorpe, Maplebeck, North Muskham, Norwell, Norwell Woodhouse, Ollerton, Ompton, Ossington, Oxton, Park Leys, Perlethorpe, Rolleston, Rufford, South Muskham, Southwell, Staythorpe, Sulcote, Sutton upon Trent, Syerston, Thorpe, Thurgarton, Upton, Walesby, Wellow, Weston, Winkburn.	
Worksop PLU	Blyth, Carburton, Carlton in Lindrick, Cuckney, Harworth + detached portion, Hodsock, Holbeck, Nether Langwith, Norton, Styrrup, Wallingwells (Nottinghamshire portion), Welbeck, Woodhouse Hall, Worksop.	Remainder of PLU in Derbyshire & West Riding of Yorkshire.

== Oxfordshire ==
Link to 1888 map showing Oxfordshire PLUs; Link to 1909 map showing Oxfordshire PLUs; Link to 1928 map showing Oxfordshire PLUs

Name	Civil Parishes	Notes
Abingdon PLU	Binsey, Burcot + detached portion, Chislehampon, Clifton Hampden, Culham, Drayton, March Baldon, Nuneham Courtenay, Sandford, Stadhampton, Toot Baldon + detached portion.	Remainder of PLU in Berkshire.
Banbury PLU	Alkerton, Banbury, Barford St John, Barford St Michael + 2 detached portions, Bloxham, Boddicot, Bourton, Clattercot, Claydon, Cropredy + 4 detached portions, Drayton, East Adderbury, East Shutford, Epwell, Hanwell, Hook Norton, Horley, Hornton, Milcomb, Milton, Mollington + detached portion, Neithrop, North Newington, Prescot, Shenington, Sibford Ferris, Sibford Gower, South Newington, Swalcliffe, Tadmarton, Wardington, West Adderbury, West Shutford, Wigginton, Wroxton.	Remainder of PLU in Northamptonshire & Warwickshire.
Bicester PLU	Ambrosden, Ardley, Arncot, Blackthorn, Bletchingdon, Bucknell, Caversfield, Charlton on Otmoor, Chesterton + detached portion, Cottisford, Fencot & Murcot, Fringford, Fritwell, Godington, Hardwick, Hethe, Intermixed Lands of Hethe & Cottisford, Islip, King's End, Bicester, Kirtlington, Launton, Lower Heyford, Market End Bicester, Merton, Middleton Stoney, Newton Purcell, Noke + detached portion, Oddington, Piddington, Shelswell, Somerton, Souldern, Stoke Lyne, Stratton Audley, Tusmore, Upper Heyford, Wendlebury, Weston on the Green.	Remainder of PLU in Buckinghamshire.
Brackley PLU	Finmere, Mixbury.	Remainder of PLU in Buckinghamshire & Northamptonshire.
Bradfield PLU	Goring, Mapledurham, Whitchurch (Oxfordshire portion).	Remainder of PLU in Berkshire.
Chipping Norton PLU	Ascot under Wychwood, Bruern, Chadlington, Charlbury & Walcot, Chastleton, Chipping Norton, Churchill, Cornbury Park, Cornwell, Enstone, Fawler, Fifield, Finstock, Great Rollright, Great Tew, Heythrop, Idbury, Kingham, Langley, Leafield, Little Rollright, Little Tew, Lyneham, Milton under Wychwood, Over Norton, Salford, Sarsden, Shipton under Wychwood, Shorthampton or Chilson, Spelsbury, Swerford + detached portion, Wychwood or Whichwood.	Remainder of PLU in Warwickshire.
Faringdon PLU	Grafton, Kelmscot, Langford, Little Faringdon, Radcot.	Remainder of PLU in Berkshire & Gloucestershire.
Headington PLU	Beckley, Chippinghurst, Cowley, Cuddesdon, Denton, Elsfield, Forest Hill with Shotover, Garsington, Headington, Holton, Horsepath, Horton cum Studley, Iffley, Littlemore, Marston, St Clement Oxford, St Giles Oxford, St John the Baptist Oxford, Stanton St John, Stow Wood, Studley, Wheatley, Wood Eaton.	
Henley PLU	Bix, Brightwell Baldwin, Britwell Prior + 2 detached portions, Britwell Salome + detached portion, Caversham, Checkendon, Cuxham, Eye & Dunsden, Harpsden, Henley on Thames, Ipsden, Nettlebed, Nuffield, Pishill, Pyrton + detached portion, Rotherfield Greys, Rotherfield Peppard, Shiplake, Swyncombe, Watlington + detached portion.	Remainder of PLU in Berkshire & Buckinghamshire.
Oxford PLU	All Saints Oxford, Christ Church Oxford, Holywell, Port Meadow, St Aldate Oxford (Oxfordshire portion), St Ebbe Oxford, St Martin Oxford, St Mary Magdalen Oxford, St Mary the Virgin Oxford, St Michael Oxford, St Peter in the East Oxford, St Peter le Bailey Oxford, St Thomas Oxford.	Remainder of PLU in Berkshire.
Thame PLU	Adwell, Albury, Ascot, Aston Rowant, Attington, Chalgrove, Chilworth, Crowell, Eastington, Emington, Great Haseley, Great Milton, Kingsey (Oxfordshire portion), Lewknor + detached portion, Little Milton, Shirburn, South Weston, Stoke Talmage, Sydenham, Tetsworth, Thame, Thomley, Tiddington, Warpsgrove, Waterperry, Waterstock, Wheatfield.	Remainder of PLU in Buckinghamshire.
Wallingford PLU	Benson + 5 detached portions, Berrick Salome + 5 detached portions, Crowmarsh Gifford, Dorchester, Ewelme + 9 detached portions, Mongewell, Newington, Newnham Murren, North Stoke, South Stoke, Warborough.	Remainder of PLU in Berkshire.
Witney PLU	Alvescot, Asthall, Aston & Cote, Bampton & Weald, Black Bourton, Brighthampton, Brize Norton, Broadwell, Broughton Poggs, Burford, Chimney, Clanfield, Cogges, Crawley, Curbridge, Ducklington, Eynsham, Fulbrook, Hailey, Hanborough, Hardwick, Holwell, Kencot, Langel Common, Lew, Minster Lovell, North Leigh, Northmoor, Osney Hill, Ramsden, Shifford, Shilton + detached portion, Standlake + detached portion, Stanton Harcourt, Swinbrook, Taynton, Telford, Upton & Signet, Westwell, Widford, Wilcote, Witney.	
Woodstock PLU	Asterleigh, Begbroke + detached portion, Bladon, Blenheim Park, Cassington, Clympton, Combe, Cutslow, Deddington, Duns Tew, Gosford + detached portion, Hampton Gay, Hampton Poyle, Hensington, Kiddington, Kidlington, Lands Common to Begbroke & Yarnton + detached portion, Middle Aston, Nether Worton, North Aston, Over Worton, Rousham, Sandford, Shipton on Cherwell, Steeple Aston, Steeple Barton + 4 detached portions, Stonesfield, Tackley, Thrup + 2 detached portions, Water Eaton + detached portion, Westcot Barton + detached portion, Woodstock, Woolvercot, Wootton, Yarnton.	
Wycombe PLU	Chinnor, Ibstone (Oxfordshire portion), Stokenchurch.	Remainder of PLU in Buckinghamshire.

== Rutland ==
Link to 1888 map showing Rutland PLUs; Link to 1909 map showing Rutland PLUs; Link to 1924 map showing Rutland PLUs

Name	Civil Parishes	Notes
Oakham PLU	Ashwell, Barrow, Braunston, Brooke, Burley, Cottesmore, Edith Weston, Egleton, Empingham, Exton, Greetham, Gunthorpe, Hambleton, Horn, Langham, Leighfield, Lyndon, Manton, Market Overton, Martinsthorpe, Normanton, Oakham Dean's Hold with Barleythorpe, Oakham Lord's Hold, Stretton, Teigh, Thistleton, Tickencote, Whissendine, Whitwell.	Remainder of PLU in Leicestershire.
Stamford PLU	Clipsham, Essendine, Great Casterton, Ketton, Little Casterton, Pickworth, Ryhall, Tinwell, Tixover.	Remainder of PLU in Huntingdonshire, Lincolnshire & Northamptonshire.
Uppingham PLU	Ayston, Barrowden, Beaumont Chase, Belton, Caldecott, Glaston, Liddington, Morcott, North Luffenham, Pilton, Preston, Ridlington, Seaton, South Luffenham, Stoke Dry, Thorpe by Water, Uppingham, Wardley, Wing.	Remainder of PLU in Leicestershire & Northamptonshire.

== Shropshire ==
Link to 1888 map showing Shropshire PLUs; Link to 1910 map showing Shropshire PLUs; Link to 1928 map showing Shropshire PLUs

Name	Civil Parishes	Notes
Atcham PLU	Acton Burnell, Alberbury with Cardeston, Albrighton, Astley, Atcham, Battlefield, Berrington, Bicton, Church Preen, Church Pulverbatch, Condover, Cound, Cressage, Eaton Constantine, Fitz, Ford, Frodesley, Great Hanwood, Habberley, Harley, Holy Cross & St Giles Shrewsbury, Hughley, Kenley, Leighton, Melverley + detached portion, Meole Brace, Minsterley, Montford, Pitchford, Pontesbury, Preston Gubbals, Ruckley & Langley, Sheinton, Shrawardine, St Alkmond, St Chad Shrewsbury, St Julian Shrewsbury, St Mary Shrewsbury, Stapleton, Sutton, Uffington, Uppington, Upton Magna, Westbury, Withington, Wollaston + detached portion, Wroxeter.	Remainder of PLU in Montgomeryshire, Wales.
Bridgnorth PLU	Acton Round, Alveley, Astley Abbotts, Aston Eyre, Billingsley, Burwarton, Chelmarsh, Chetton, Claverley, Cleobury North, Deuxhill, Ditton Priors, Eardington, Glazeley, Middleton Scriven, Monkhopton, Morville, Neenton, Oldbury, Quatford, Quatt, Romsley, Sidbury, St Leonard Bridgnorth, St Mary Magdalene Bridgnorth, Stanton Long, Tasley, Upton Cressett, Worfield.	
Church Stretton PLU	Acton Scott, Cardington, Church Stretton, Easthorpe, Eaton, Hope Bowdler, Leebotwood, Longnor, Rushbury, Shipton, Sibdon Carwood, Smethcott, Wistanstow, Woolstaston.	
Cleobury Mortimer PLU	Aston Botterell, Cleobury Mortimer, Coreley, Farlow, Hopton Wafers, Kinlet, Loughton, Milson, Neen Savage, Neen Sollars, Silvington, Stottesden, Wheathill, Woodhouse.	Remainder of PLU in Worcestershire.
Clun PLU	Bishop's Castle, Clun, Clunbury, Clungunford, Edgton, Hopesay, Hopton Castle, Lydbury North, Lydham, Mainstone, Mindtown, More, Norbury, Ratlinghope, Shelve, Wentnor.	Remainder of PLU in Montgomeryshire, Wales.
Drayton PLU	Adderley, Cheswardine, Child's Ercall, Drayton in Hales, Hinstock, Hodnet, Moreton Say, Norton in Hales, Stoke upon Tern, Woore.	Remainder of PLU in Cheshire & Staffordshire.
Ellesmere PLU	Baschurch, Ellesmere, Great Ness, Hadnall + detached portion, Hordley, Little Ness, Middle, Petton, Welsh Hampton.	Remainder of PLU in Flintshire, Wales.
Forden PLU	Brompton & Rhiston, Chirbury, Worthen.	Remainder of PLU in Montgomeryshire, Wales.
Kidderminster PLU	Dowles.	Remainder of PLU in Staffordshire & Worcestershire.
Knighton PLU	Bedstone, Bettws-y-Crwyn, Buckneil, Llanvair Waterdine, Stow.	Remainder of PLU in Herefordshire, England & Radnorshire, Wales.
Ludlow PLU	Abdon, Ashford Bowdler, Ashford Carbonell, Bitterly, Bromfield, Caynham, Clee St Margaret, Cold Weston, Culmington, Diddlebury, East Hamlet, Halford, Heath, Holdgate, Hope Baggot, Hopton Cangeford, Leintwardine North (Shropshire portion), Ludford (Shropshire portion), Ludlow Castle, Munslow, Onibury, Richard's Castle (Shropshire portion), St Lawrence Ludlow, Stanton Lacy, Stoke St Milborough, Stokesay, Tugford.	Remainder of PLU in Herefordshire.
Madeley PLU	Barrow + detached portion, Benthall, Broseley, Buildwas, Dawley Magna, Linley, Little Wenlock, Madeley, Much Wenlock, Posenhall, Stirchley, Willey.	
Newport PLU	Cherrington, Chetwynd, Chetwynd Aston, Church Aston + detached portion, Edgmond, Lilleshall, Longford, Newport, Tibberton, Woodcote.	Remainder of PLU in Staffordshire.
Oswestry PLU	Kinnerley, Knockin, Llanyblodwel + detached portion, Llanymynech, Oswestry Rural, Oswestry Town, Ruyton of the Eleven Towns, Selattyn, St Martin, Sychtyn, West Felton, Whittington.	Remainder of PLU in Denbighshire, Wales.
Seisdon PLU	Bobbington (Shropshire portion), Rudge.	Remainder of PLU in Staffordshire.
Shifnal PLU	Albrighton + detached portion, Badger, Beckbury, Boningale, Boscobel, Donington, Kemberton, Ryton, Sheriff Hales (Shropshire portion), Shifnal, Stockton, Sutton Maddock, Tong.	Remainder of PLU in Staffordshire.
Tenbury PLU	Boraston, Burford, Greet, Nash, Whitton.	Remainder of PLU in Herefordshire & Worcestershire.
Wellington PLU	Bolas Magna, Ercall Magna, Eyton upon the Weald Moors, Kinnersley, Longdon upon Tern, Preston upon the Weald Moors, Rodington, Waters Upton, Wellington, Wombridge, Wrockwardine, Wrockwardine Wood.	
Wem PLU	Broughton, Clive, Grinshill, Lee Brockhurst, Loppington, Moreton Corbet, Prees + detached portion, Shawbury + detached portion, Stanton upon Hine Heath, Wem, Weston & Wixhill under Redcastle.	
Whitchurch PLU	Ightfield, Whitchurch + detached portion.	Remainder of PLU in Cheshire, England & Flintshire, Wales.

== Somerset ==
Link to 1888 map showing Somerset PLUs; Link to 1909 map showing Somerset PLUs; Link to 1928 map showing Somerset PLUs

Name	Civil Parishes	Notes
Axbridge PLU	Axbridge, Badgworth, Banwell, Berrow, Biddisham, Blagdon, Bleadon, Brean, Brent Knoll, Burnham, Burrington, Butcombe, Chapel Allerton, Charterhouse on Mendip, Cheddar, Christon, Churchill, Compton Bishop, Congresbury, East Brent, Hutton, Kewstoke, Locking, Loxton, Lympsham, Mark, Puxton, Rowberrow, Shipham, Steepholm, Uphill, Weare, Wedmore, Weston Super Mare, Wick St Lawrence, Winscombe, Worle, Wrington, Wyland cum Batcombe.	
Bath PLU	Bathampton, Batheaston, Bathford, Bathwick, Charlcombe, Claverton, Combe Hay, Dunkerton, English Combe, Freshford, Hinton Charterhouse, Langridge, Lyncombe & Widcombe, Monkton Combe, South Stoke, St Catherine, St James Bath, St Michael Bath, St Peter & St Paul Bath, Swainswick, Twerton, Walcot, Wellow, Weston, Woolley.	
Beaminster PLU	Misterton, Seaborough.	Remainder of PLU in Dorset.
Bedminster PLU	Abbots Leigh, Backwell, Barrow Gurney, Bedminster (Somerset portion), Brockley, Clapton, Clevedon, Dundry, Easton in Gordano, Flax Bourton, Kenn, Kingston Seymour, Long Ashton, Nailsea, Portbury, Portishead, Tickenham, Walton in Gordano, Weston in Gordano, Winford, Wraxall, Yatton.	Remainder of PLU in Gloucestershire.
Bridgwater PLU	Aisholt, Ashcott, Bawdrip, Bridgwater, Brodmfield, Cannington, Catcott + detached portion, Charlinch + detached portion, Chedzoy, Chilton Common, Chilton Trinity, Chilton upon Polden + detached portion, Cossington + detached portion, Durleigh, Edington + detached portion, Enmore, Fiddington, Goathurst, Greinton, Huntspill, Lyng, Middlezoy, Moorlinch, Nether Stowey, North Petherton, Othery, Otterhampton, Over Stowey, Pawlett, Puriton, Shapwick + detached portion, Spaxton, St Michaelchurch, Stawell, Stockland Bristol, Sutton Mallet, Thurloxton, Wembdon, Weston Zoyland, Woolavington.	
Chard PLU	Ashill, Broadway, Buckland St Mary, Chaffcombe, Chard, Chard Borough, Chillington, Combe St Nicholas, Crewkerne, Cricket St Thomas, Cudworth, Dinnington, Donyatt, Dowlish Wake, Hinton St George, Ilminster, Ilton, Kingstone, Knowle St Giles, Lopen, Merriott, Seavington St Mary, Seavington St Michael, Shepton Beauchamp, Stocklinch, Wayford, West Dowlish, White Lackington, White Staunton, Winsham.	Remainder of PLU in Devon & Dorset.
Clutton PLU	Cameley, Camerton, Chelwood, Chew Magna, Chew Stoke, Chilcompton + detached portion, Clutton, Compton Martin, East Harptree, Farmborough, Farrington Gurney, High Littleton, Hinton Blewett, Litton, Midsomer Norton + 3 detached portions, Nempnett Thrubwell, North Widcombe, Norton Hawkfield, Norton Malreward, Paulton, Publow, Radstock, Stanton Drew, Stone Easton, Stowey, Timsbury, Ubley, West Harptree.	
Dulverton PLU	Brushford, Dulverton, Exford, Exton, Hawkridge, Huish Champflower, Kings Brompton, Skilgate, Upton, Winsford, Withypool.	Remainder of PLU in Devon.
Frome PLU	Babington, Beckington, Berkley, Buckland Denham, Cloford, Elm, Farleigh Hungerford, Foxcote, Frome, Hardington, Hemington, Kilmersdon, Laverton, Leigh upon Mendip, Lullington, Marston Bigot, Norton St Philip, Nunney, Orchardleigh, Road, Rodden, Tellisford, Wanstrow, Whatley, Witham Friary, Woolverton, Writhlington.	
Keynsham PLU	Brislington, Burnett, Compton Dando, Corston, Kelston, Keynsham, Marksbury, Newton St Loe, North Stoke, Priston, Queen Charlton, Saltford, Stanton Prior, Whitchurch.	Remainder of PLU in Gloucestershire.
Langport PLU	Aller, Babcary, Barrington, Barton St David, Beer Crocombe, Charlton Mackrell, Compton Dundon, Curry Mallett, Curry Rivel, Drayton, Earnshill, Fivehead, High Ham, Huish Episcopi, Isle Abbotts, Isle Brewers, Keinton Mandeville, Kingsbury Episcopi, Kingsdon, Kingweston, Langport, Long Sutton, Muchelney, Pitney, Puckington, Somerton, Swell.	
Mere PLU	Kilmington, Maiden Bradley (Somerset portion), Stourton (Somerset portion).	Remainder of PLU in Dorset & Wiltshire.
Shepton Mallet PLU	Ashwick, Batcombe, Binegar, Croscombe, Ditcheat, Doulting, Downhead, East Cranmore, East Lydford, East Pennard, Emborrow, Evercreech, Holcombe, Hornblotton, Lamyatt, Milton Clevedon, Pilton, Pylle, Shepton Mallet, Stoke Lane, Stratton on the Fosse, Upton Noble, West Bradley, West Canmore, West Lydford.	
Sherborne PLU	Goathill, Marston Magna, Poyntington, Rimpton, Sandford Orcas, Trent.	Remainder of PLU in Dorset.
South Molton PLU	Exmoor.	Remainder of PLU in Devon.
Taunton PLU	Angers Leigh, Ash Priors, Bickenhall, Bishops Hull Within Taunton, Bishops Hull Without Taunton, Bishops Lydeard, Cheddon Fitzpaine, Combe Florey, Corfe, Cothelstone, Creech St Michael, Curland, Durston, Halse, Hatch Beauchamp, Heathfield, Kingston + detached portion, Lydeard St Lawrence, North Curry, Norton Fitzwarren, Orchard Portman, Otterford, Pitminster, Ruishton, St James Within Taunton, St James Without Taunton, St Mary Magdalen Within Taunton, St Mary Magdalen Without Taunton, Staple Fitzpaine, Staplegrove, Stoke St Gregory, Stoke St Mary, Thorn Falcon, Thurlbear, Tolland, Trull, West Bagborough, West Hatch, West Monkton, Wilton.	Remainder of PLU in Devon.
Wellington PLU	Ashbrittle, Bathealton, Bradford (a.k.a Bradford on Tone), Chipstable, Fitzhead, Kittisford, Langford Budville, Milverton, Nynehead, Oake, Raddington, Runnington, Sampford Arundel, Stawley, Thorne St Margaret, Wellington, West Buckland, Wiveliscombe.	Remainder of PLU in Devon.
Wells PLU	Baltonsborough, Butleigh, Chewton Mendip, Dinder, Glastonbury, Meare, North Wootton, Priddy, Rodney Stoke, St Andrew Wells, St Cuthbert In Wells, St Cuthbert Out Wells, Street, Walton, West Pennard, Westbury, Wookey.	
Williton PLU	Bicknoller, Brompton Ralph, Carhampton, Clatworthy, Crowcombe, Culbone, Cutcombe, Dodington, Dunster, East Quantoxhead, Elworthy, Holford, Kilton with Lilstock, Kilve + detached portion, Luccombe, Luxborough, Minehead, Monksilver, Nettlecombe, Oare, Old Cleeve, Porlock, Sampford Brett, Selworthy, St Decumans, Stogumber, Stogursey, Stoke Pero, Stringston, Timberscombe, Treborough, West Quantoxhead, Withiel Florey, Withycombe, Wootton Courtney.	
Wincanton PLU	Abbas & Temple Combe, Alford, Ansford, Blackford, Bruton, Castle Cary, Charlton Horethorne, Charlton Musgrove, Compton Pauncefoot, Corton Denham, Cucklington, Henstridge, Holton, Horsington, Lovington, Maperton, Milborne Port, North Barrow, North Brewham, North Cadbury, North Cheriton, Penselwood, Pitcombe, Queen Camel, Shepton Montague, South Barrow, South Brewham, South Cadbury, Sparkford, Stoke Trister, Stowell, Sutton Montis, Weston Bampfylde, Wheathill, Wincanton, Yarlington.	Remainder of PLU in Dorset.
Yeovil PLU	Ashington, Barwick, Brympton, Chilthorne Domer, Chilton Cantelo, Chiselborough, Closworth, East Chinnock, East Coker, Hardington Mandeville, Haselbury Plucknett, Ilchester, Limington, Lufton, Martock, Montacute, Mudford, North Perrott, Norton sub Hamdon, Noverover, Odcombe, Pendomer, Podimore, Preston Plucknett, Sock Dennis, South Petherton, Stoke sub Hamdon, Sutton Bingham, Thorne (a.k.a. Thorne Coffin), Tintinhull, West Camel, West Chinnock, West Coker, Yeovil, Yeovilton.	

== Staffordshire ==
Link to 1888 map showing Staffordshire PLUs; Link to 1908 map showing Staffordshire PLUs; Link to 1928 map showing Staffordshire PLUs

Name	Civil Parishes	Notes
Ashbourne PLU	Alstonfield, Blore with Swinscoe, Calton, Calwich, Ellastone, Ilam, Mayfield, Okeover, Prestwood, Ramshorn, Stanton, Waterfall, Wetton, Woodhouses, Wootton.	Remainder of PLU in Derbyshire.
Burton upon Trent PLU	Anslow, Barton under Needwood, Branston, Burton Extra, Burton upon Trent, District of Highlands Park, Dunstall, Foston & Scropton (3 detached Staffordshire portions), Hanbury + 3 detached portions, Horninglow, Rolleston + detached portion, Stretton, Tatenhill, Tutbury, Wichnor.	Remainder of PLU in Derbyshire.
Cannock PLU	Acton Trussell & Bednall, Brewood, Bushbury, Cannock, Cheslyn Hay, Church Eaton, Coppershall, Dunston, Essington, Featherstone, Great Wyrley, Hatherton, Hilton, Huntington, Kinvaston + detached portion, Lapley + detached portion, Norton under Cannock, Penkridge, Saredon, Shareshill + detached portion, Stretton, Teddesley Hay.	
Cheadle PLU	Alton, Bradley in the Moors, Caldon, Caverswall, Cheadle, Checkley + 2 detached portions, Cheddleton, Consall, Cotton, Denstone + detached portion, Dilhorne, Draycott in the Moors, Farley, Ipstones, Kingsley.	
Congleton PLU	Biddulph.	Remainder of PLU in Cheshire.
Drayton PLU	Ashley, Mucklestone, Tyrley.	Remainder of PLU in Cheshire & Shropshire.
Dudley PLU	Dudley Castle Hill, Rowley Regis, Sedgley + detached portion, Tipton.	Remainder of PLU in Worcestershire.
Kidderminster PLU	Upper Arley.	Remainder of PLU in Shropshire & Worcestershire.
Kings Norton PLU	Harborne, Smethwick.	Remainder of PLU in Warwickshire & Worcestershire.
Leek PLU	Bradnop & Cawdry + 3 detached portions, Butterton, Endon Longsdon & Stanley, Fawfieldhead + detached portion, Grindon, Heathylee, Heaton, Hollinsclough, Horton, Leek & Lowe + 2 detached portions, Leekfrith + detached portion, Longnor, Norton in the Moors, Onecote, Quarnford, Rudyard, Rushton James, Rushton Spencer, Sheen, Tittesworth + detached portion, Warslow & Elkstones.	
Lichfield PLU	Alrewas, Armitage, Burntwood Edial & Woodhouses, Colton, Curborough & Elmhurst, Elford, Farewell & Chorley, Fisherwick, Freeford, Fulfen, Hammerwich, Hamstall Ridware + detached portion, Haselour, King's Bromley, King's Bromley Hays, Longdon, Mavesyn Ridware, Ogley Hay, Pipe Ridware, Pipehall, Rugeley, Shenstone, St Chad Lichfield, St Mary Lichfield, St Michael Lichfield, Streethay, Swinfen & Packington, Tamhorn, The Close Lichfield, The Friary Lichfield, Wall, Weeford, Whittington, Yoxall.	
Newcastle under Lyme PLU	Audley, Balterley, Betley, Chorlton, Eccleshall (detached portion), Keele, Madeley, Maer, Newcastle under Lyme, Whitmore.	
Newport PLU	Adbaston, Forton, Gnosall, High Offley, Norbury, Weston Jones.	Remainder of PLU in Shropshire.
Seisdon PLU	Bobbington (Staffordshire portion), Codsall, Enville, Himley, Kinver, Lower Penn, Pattingham, Tettenhall, Trysull & Seisdon, Upper Penn, Wombourn, Woodford Grange.	Remainder of PLU in Shropshire.
Shifnal PLU	Blymhill, Patshull, Sheriff Hales (Staffordshire portion), Weston under Lizard.	Remainder of PLU in Shropshire.
Stafford PLU	Baswich Milford & Walton, Bradley, Brocton, Castle Church, Chartley Holme, Colwich, Creswell, Ellenhall, Fradswell, Gayton, Haughton, Hopton & Coton, Ingestre, Marston, Ranton, Salt & Enson, Seighford, St Mary & St Chad Stafford, Stowe + detached portion, Tillington, Tixall, Weston upon Trent, Whitgreave, Worston, Yarlett.	
Stoke upon Trent PLP	Stoke upon Trent.	
Stone PLU	Barlaston, Chebsey, Cold Norton, Eccleshall, Milwich, Sandon, Standon + detached portion, Stone, Swynnerton, Trentham + 2 detached portions.	
Stourbridge PLU	Amblecote, Kingswinford.	Remainder of PLU in Worcestershire.
Tamworth PLU	Carwell, Clifton Campville & Haunton, Croxall (Staffordshire portion) + detached portion, Drayton Bassett, Edingale, Fazeley, Harlaston, Hints, Statfold, Syerscote, Tamworth (Staffordshire portion), Thorpe Constantine, Wiggington.	Remainder of PLU in Derbyshire & Warwickshire.
Uttoxeter PLU	Abbots’ Bromley, Blithfield, Bramshall, Croxden + detached portion, Draycott in the Clay +5 detached portions, Field, Gratwich, Kingston, Leigh, Marchington + 4 detached portions, Marchington Woodlands + 4 detached portions, Newborough, Rocester + 3 detached portions, Uttoxeter + 2 detached portions.	Remainder of PLU in Derbyshire.
Walsall PLU	Aldridge, Bentley, Great Barr, Pelsall, Rushall, Walsall Borough, Walsall Foreign + detached portion.	
West Bromwich PLU	Handsworth, Wednesbury, West Bromwich.	Remainder of PLU in Worcestershire.
Wolstanton & Burslem PLU	Burslem, Wolstanton.	
Wolverhampton PLU	Bilston, Wednesfield, Willenhall, Wolverhampton.	

== Suffolk ==
Link to 1888 map showing Suffolk PLUs; Link to 1909 map showing Suffolk PLUs; Link to 1924 map showing Suffolk PLUs

Name	Civil Parishes	Notes
Blything PLU	Aldringham cum Thorpe, Benacre, Blyford, Blythburgh, Bramfield, Brampton, Chediston, Cookley, Covehithe, Cratfield, Darsham, Dunwich, Easton Bavents, Frostenden, Halesworth, Henham, Henstead, Heveningham, Holton, Huntingfield, Kelsale, Knodishall, Leiston, Linstead Magna, Linstead Parva, Middleton, Peasenhall, Reydon, Rumburgh, Sibton, Sotherton, South Cove, Southwold, Spexhall, Stoven, Theberton, Thorington, Ubbeston, Uggeshall, Walberswick, Walpole, Wangford, Westhall, Westleton, Wissett, Wrentham, Yoxford.	
Bosmere & Claydon PLU	Akenham, Ashbocking, Ashfield, Badley, Barham, Barking, Battisford, Baylham, Bramford, Claydon, Coddenham, Creeting St Mary, Crowfield, Debenham, Earl Stonham, Flowton, Framsden, Gosbeck, Great Blakenham, Great Bricett, Helmingham, Hemingstone, Henley, Little Blakenham, Mickfield, Nettlestead, Offton, Pettaugh, Ringshall, Somersham, Stonham Aspal, Swilland, Willisham, Winston.	
Bury St Edmunds PLU	St James Bury St Edmunds, St Mary Bury St Edmunds.	
Cosford PLU	Aldham, Bildeston, Boxford, Brent Eleigh, Brettenham, Chelsworth, Cockfield, Edwardstone, Elmsett, Groton, Hadleigh, Hadleigh Hamlet, Hitcham, Kersey, Kettlebaston, Lavenham, Layham, Lindsey, Milden, Monks Eleigh, Naughton, Nedging, Polstead, Preston St Mary, Semer, Thorpe Morieux, Wattisham, Whatfield.	
Great Yarmouth PLP	Great Yarmouth (Suffolk portion).	Remainder of PLU in Norfolk.
Hartismere PLU	Aspall, Bacton, Botesdale, Braiseworth, Brome, Burgate, Cotton, Eye, Finningham, Gislingham, Mellis, Mendlesham, Oakley, Occold, Palgrave, Redgrave, Redlingfield, Rickinghall Superior, Rishangles, Stoke Ash, Stuston, Thorndon, Thornham Magna, Thornham Parva, Thrandeston, Thwaite, Westhorpe, Wetheringsett-cum-Brockford, Wickham Skeith, Wortham, Wyverstone, Yaxley.	
Hoxne PLU	Athelington, Badingham, Bedfield, Bedingfield, Brundish, Denham, Dennington, Fressingfield, Horham, Hoxne, Laxfield, Mendham, Metfield, Monk Soham, Saxtead, Southolt, Stradbroke, Syleham, Tannington, Weybread, Wilby, Wingfield, Worlingworth.	
Ipswich PLU	Shire Hall Yard Ipswich, St Clement Ipswich, St Helen Ipswich + 2 detached portions, St Lawrence Ipswich, St Margaret Ipswich, St Mary at the Elms Ipswich, St Mary at the Quay Ipswich, St Mary at the Tower Ipswich + detached portion, St Mary Stoke Ipswich, St Matthew Ipswich, St Nicholas Ipswich + detached portion, St Peter Ipswich, St Stephen Ipswich + 5 detached portions, Warren House, Westerfield, Whitton cum Thurlston.	
Mildenhall PLU	Barton Mills, Cavenham, Elveden, Eriswell, Freckenham, Herringswell, Icklingham, Kentford, Lakenheath, Mildenhall, Tuddenham, Wangford, Worlington.	
Mutford & Lothingland PLU	Ashby, Barnby, Belton, Blundeston, Bradwell, Burgh Castle, Carlton Colville, Corton, Flixton, Fritton, Gisleham, Gorleston (Suffolk portion), Gunton, Herringfleet, Hopton-on-Sea, Kessingland, Kirkley, Lound, Lowestoft, Mutford, Oulton, Pakefield, Rushmere, Somerleyton.	Remainder of PLU in Norfolk.
Newmarket PLU	Dalham, Exning, Gazeley, Lidgate, Moulton, Ousden, St Mary Newmarket.	Remainder of PLU in Cambridgeshire.
Plomesgate PLU	Aldeburgh, Benhall, Blaxhall, Brandeston, Bruisyard, Butley, Campsea Ashe, Chillesford, Cransford, Cretingham, Earl Soham, Easton, Eyke, Farnham, Framlingham, Friston, Gedgrave, Great Glemham, Hacheston, Hazlewood, Hoo, Iken, Kenton, Kettleburgh, Letheringham, Little Glemham, Marlesford, Monewden, Orford, Parham, Rendham, Rendlesham, Saxmundham, Snape, Sternfield, Stratford St Andrew, Sudbourne, Sweffling, Wantisden, Wickham Market.	
Risbridge PLU	Barnardiston, Clare, Cowlinge, Denston, Great Bradley, Great Thurlow, Great Wratting, Haverhill (Suffolk portion), Hundon, Kedington (Suffolk portion), Little Bradley, Little Thurlow, Little Wratting, Monks Risbridge, Poslingford, Stansfield, Stoke-by-Clare, Stradishall, Wickhambrook, Withersfield, Wixoe.	Remainder of PLU in Essex.
Samford PLU	Belstead, Bentley, Suffolk, Brantham, Burstall, Capel St Mary, Chattisham, Chelmondiston, Copdock, East Bergholt, Erwarton, Freston, Great Wenham, Harkstead, Higham, Hintlesham, Holbrook, Holton St Mary, Little Wenham, Raydon, Shelley, Shotley, Sproughton, Stratford St Mary, Stutton, Tattingstone, Washbrook, Wherstead, Woolverstone.	
Stow PLU	Badwell Ash, Beyton, Buxhall, Combs, Creeting St Peter, Drinkstone, Elmswell, Felsham, Gedding, Gipping, Great Ashfield, Great Finborough, Harleston, Haughley, Hessett, Hinderclay, Hunston, Langham, Little Finborough, Norton, Old Newton, Onehouse, Rattlesden, Rickinghall Inferior, Shelland, Stowlangtoft, Stowmarket, Stowupland, Thurston, Tostock, Walsham le Willows, Wattisfield, Wetherden, Woolpit.	
Sudbury PLU	Acton, Alpheton, Assington, Boxted, Bures St Mary, Cavendish, Chilton, Glemsford, Great Cornard, Great Waldingfield, Hartest, Hawkedon, Lawshall, Little Cornard, Little Waldingfield, Long Melford, Nayland with Wissington, Newton, Suffolk, Shimpling, Somerton, St Bartholomew Sudbury + 4 detached portions, Stanstead, Suffolk, Stoke by Nayland, Sudbury + 4 detached portions.	Remainder of PLU in Essex.
Thetford PLU	Barnham, Barningham, Brandon (Suffolk portion), Coney Weston, Euston, Fakenham Magna, Hepworth, Honington, Hopton, Suffolk, Knettishall, Market Weston, Rushford (Suffolk portion), Santon Downham, Sapiston, Thelnetham, Thetford St Cuthbert (Suffolk portion), Thetford St Mary (Suffolk portion).	Remainder of PLU in Norfolk.
Thingoe PLU	Ampton, Bardwell, Barrow, Bradfield Combust, Bradfield St Clare, Bradfield St George, Brockley, Chedburgh, Chevington, Chimney Mills, Culford, Denham, Depden, Flempton, Fornham All Saints, Fornham St Genevieve, Fornham St Martin, Great Barton, Great Livermere, Great Saxham, Great Welnetham, Hardwick, Hargrave, Hawstead, Hengrave, Horningsheath or Horringer, Ickworth, Ingham, Ixworth, Ixworth Thorpe, Lackford, Little Livermere, Little Saxham, Little Welnetham, Nowton, Pakenham, Rede, Risby, Rougham, Rushbrooke, Southwell Park (part of Hargrave), Stanningfield, Stanton, Troston, West Stow, Westley, Whepstead, Wordwell.	
Wangford PLU	All Saints and St Nicholas, South Elmham, Barsham, Beccles, Bungay Holy Trinity, Bungay St Mary + detached portion, Ellough, Flixton, Homersfield, Ilketshall St Andrew, St John, Ilketshall, Ilketshall St Lawrence, Ilketshall St Margaret, Mettingham, North Cove, Redisham, Ringsfield, Shadingfield, Shipmeadow, Sotterley, St Cross South Elmham, St James South Elmham, St Margaret South Elmham, St Michael South Elmham, St Peter South Elmham, Weston, Willingham, Worlingham.	
Woodbridge PLU	Alderton, Alnesbourn Priory, Bawdsey, Boulge, Boyton, Bredfield, Brightwell, Bromeswell, Bucklesham, Burgh, Capel St Andrew, Charsfield, Clopton, Culpho, Dallinghoo, Dallinghoo Wield, Debach, Falkenham, Felixstowe, Foxhall, Great Bealings, Grundisburgh, Hasketon, Hemley, Hollesley, Kesgrave, Kirton, Levington, Little Bealings, Martlesham, Melton, Nacton, Newbourn, Otley, Pettistree, Playford, Purdis Farm, Ramsholt, Rushmere, Shottisham, Stratton Hall, Sutton, Trimley St Martin, Trimley St Mary, Tuddenham St Martin, Ufford, Waldringfield, Walton, Witnesham, Woodbridge.	

== Surrey ==
Link to 1888 map showing Surrey PLUs; Link to 1908 map showing Surrey PLUs; Link to 1927 map showing Surrey PLUs

Name	Civil Parishes	Notes
Chertsey PLU	Bisley + detached portion, Byfleet, Chertsey, Chobham, Horsell, Pyrford, Walton upon Thames, Weybridge, Windlesham.	
Croydon PLU	Addington, Beddington, Coulsdon, Croydon, Merton, Mitcham + detached portion, Morden, Penge, Sanderstead, Wallington, Woodmansterne.	
Dorking PLU	Abinger, Capel, Dorking, Effingham, Mickleham, Newdigate, Ockley, Wotton.	
East Grinstead PLU	Lingfield.	Remainder of PLU in Sussex.
Epsom PLU	Ashstead, Banstead, Carshalton, Cheam, Chessington, Cobham, Cuddington, Epsom, Ewell, Fetcham, Great Bookham, Headley, Leatherhead, Little Bookham, Stoke D’Abernon, Sutton.	
Farnham PLU	Ash & Normandy, Farnham, Frensham, Frimley, Seale.	Remainder of PLU in Hampshire.
Godstone PLU	Blechingley + detached portion, Caterham, Chelsham, Crowhurst, Farley, Godstone + detached portion, Horne + detached portion, Limpsfield, Oxted, Tandridge + detached portion, Tatsfield, Titsey, Warlingham, Woldingham.	
Guildford PLU	Albury, Compton, East Clandon, East Horsley, Godalming, Holy Trinity Guildford, Merrow, Ockham, Pirbright, Puttenham, Send & Ripley, Shere, St Mary Guildford, St Nicholas Guildford, Stoke, The Friary Guildford, Wanborough, West Clandon, West Horsley, Wisley, Woking, Worplesdon.	
Hambledon PLU	Alfold, Bramley, Chiddingfold, Cranley, Dunsfold, Elstead, Ewhurst, Hambledon, Hascombe + detached portion, Haslemere, Peper Harow, Shalford + detached portion, St Martha, Thursley, Witley, Wonersh.	
Kingston upon Thames PLU	East Molesey, Esher, Ham, Hook, Kingston upon Thames, Long Ditton + detached portion, Malden, Thames Ditton, West Molesey, Wimbledon.	Remainder of PLU in Middlesex.
Reigate PLU	Betchworth, Borough of Reigate + detached portion, Buckland + 2 detached portions, Burstow, Chaldon, Charlwood + 2 detached portions, Chipstead, Foreign of Reigate, Gatton, Horley, Kingswood, Leigh, Merstham, Nutfield, Walton on the Hill.	
Richmond PLU	Barnes, Kew, Mortlake, Petersham, Richmond.	
Windsor PLU	Egham, Thorpe.	Remainder of PLU in Berkshire.

== Sussex ==
Link to 1888 map showing Sussex PLUs; Link to 1909 map showing Sussex PLUs; Link to 1928 map showing Sussex PLUs

Name	Civil Parishes	Notes
Battle PLU	Ashburnham, Battle, Bexhill, Brightling, Catsfield, Crowhurst, Dallington, Ewhurst, Hollington, Mountfield, Penhurst, Sedlescombe, Westfield, Whatlington.	
Brighton PLP	Brighton	
Chailey PLU	Barcombe + detached portion, Chailey + detached portion, Ditchling, East Chiltington, Hamsey, Newick + detached portion, Plumpton, Ringmer, Street, Westmeston + detached portion, Wivelsfield.	
Chichester PLU	All Saints or the Pallant Chichester + detached portion, Cathedral Close Chichester, New Town Chichester, St Andrew Chichester, St Bartholomew Chichester, St James's Chichester, St Martin Chichester, St Olave Chichester, St Pancras Chichester, St Peter the Great otherwise Subdeanery Chichester + 2 detached portions, St Peter the Less Chichester.	
Cuckfield PLU	Albourne, Ardingley + detached portion, Balcombe, Bolney, Clayton + detached portion, Cowfold, Cuckfield, Horsted Keynes, Hurstpierpoint + detached portion, Keymer + detached portion, Lindfield, Newtimber, Piecombe, Slaugham, Twineham.	
Eastbourne PLU	Alfriston, Eastbourne, Eastdean, Folkington + detached portion, Friston, Jevington, Litlington, Lullington + detached portion, Pevensey, Seaford, Westdean, Westham, Willingdon, Wilmington.	
East Grinstead PLU	East Grinstead, Hartfield, West Hoathly, Withyham, Worth.	Remainder of PLU in Surrey.
East Preston PLU	Angmering, Arundel, Broadwater, Burpham, Burrington, Clapham + 2 detached portions, Climping, East Preston, Ferring, Ford, Goring, Heene, Houghton, Kingston, Leominster, Littlehampton, Patching, Poling, Rustington, South Stoke, Tortington, Warningcamp, West Tarring.	
Hailsham PLU	Arlington, Chiddingly, Hailsham, Heathfield, Hellingly, Herstmonceux, Hooe, Laughton, Ninfield, Warbleton, Wartling.	
Hastings PLU	All Saints Hastings, Fairlight, Guestling, Holy Trinity Hastings, Ore, Pett, St Andrew Hastings, St Clement Hastings, St Leonard, St Mary Bulverhythe, St Mary in the Castle Hastings, St Mary Magdalen Hastings, St Michael on the Rock Hastings.	
Horsham PLU	Billingshurst, Crawley + detached portion, Horsham, Ifield, Itchingfield, Lower Beeding, Nuthurst + detached portion, Rudgwick, Rusper, Shipley, Slinfold, Upper Beeding (detached portion), Warnham, West Grinstead.	
Lewes PLU	All Saints Lewes, Precinct of the Castle Lewes, South Malling, St Anne Lewes, St John Sub Castro + detached portion, St John the Baptist Southover, St Michael Lewes, St Thomas in the Cliffe Lewes.	
Midhurst PLU	Bepton, Chithurst, Cocking, Didling, Easebourne, East Lavington, Elsted, Fernhurst, Graffham, Harting, Heyshott, Iping, Linch, Linchmere, Lodsworth, Lurgashall, Midhurst, North Ambersham, Rogate, Selham, South Ambersham, Stedham, Terwick, Tillington, Treyford, Trotton, West Lavington, Woolbeding.	
Newhaven PLU	Bishopstone, Denton, East Blatchington, Falmer, Iford + detached portion, Kingston, Newhaven, Ovingdean, Piddinghoe, Rodmell, Rottingdean, South Heighton, Southease, Stanmer, Tarring Neville, Telscombe.	
Petersfield PLU	Bramshott (Sussex portion) + detached portion.	Remainder of PLU in Hampshire.
Petworth PLU	Barlavington, Bignor + 2 detached portions, Burton + 4 detached portions, Bury, Coates, Duncton, Egdean, Fittleworth, Kirdford, North Chapel, Petworth, Stopham, Sutton, Wisborough.	
Rye PLU	Beckley, Brede + detached portion, Broomhill (Sussex portion), East Guldeford, Icklesham, Iden, Northiam, Peasmarsh, Playden, Rye + detached portion, St Leonard Hastings (detached portion), St Thomas the Apostle Winchelsea + detached portion, Udimore + 3 detached portions.	Remainder of PLU in Kent.
Steyning PLU	Aldrington, Ashurst + detached portion, Botolphs, Bramber, Coombes, Edburton, Hangleton, Henfield, Hove, Kingston by Sea, Lancing, New Shoreham, Old Shoreham, Patcham, Portslade, Poynings, Preston, Shermanbury, Sompting, Southwick, Steyning + detached portion, Upper Beeding, West Blatchington, Woodmancote.	
Thakeham PLU	Amberley, Ashington + detached portion, Coldwaltham, Finden, Greatham, Hardham, North Stoke, Parham, Pulborough, Rackham, Storrington, Sullington, Thakeham + 3 detached portions, Warminghurst, Washington, West Chiltington, Wiggonholt, Wiston.	
Ticehurst PLU	Bodiam, Burwash, Etchingham, Frant (Sussex portion), Lamberhurst (Sussex portion), Salehurst, Ticehurst, Wadhurst.	Remainder of PLU in Kent.
Tunbridge PLU	Horsemonden (Sussex portion)	Remainder of PLU in Kent.
Uckfield PLU	Buxted, East Hoathly, Fletching, Framfield, Isfield, Little Horsted, Maresfield, Mayfield, Rotherfield, Uckfield, Waldron.	
Westbourne PLU	Bosham, Chidham, Compton + detached portion, East Marden + detached portion, Funtington, North Marden, Racton, Stoughton + 5 detached portions, Up Marden, West Dean, West Thorney, Westbourne.	
West Firle PLU	Alciston + detached portion, Beddingham + detached portion, Berwick, Chalvington, Glynde, Ripe, Selmeston + 2 detached portions, West Firle.	
West Hampnett PLU	Aldingbourne, Appledram, Barnham, Binderton, Binsted, Birdham, Boxgrove + detached portion, Donnington, Earnley, Eartham, East Dean, East Wittering + 2 detached portions, Eastergate, Felpham, Hunston, Lavant, Madehurst, Merston, Middleton, New Fishbourne, North Mundham, Oving, Pagham, Rumboldswyke, Selsey, Sidlesham, Singleton, Slindon, South Bersted, Tangmere, Up Waltham, Walberton, West Hampnett, West Itchenor, West Stoke, West Wittering, Yapton.	

== Warwickshire ==
Link to 1888 map showing Warwickshire PLUs; Link to 1910 map showing Warwickshire PLUs; Link to 1929 map showing Warwickshire PLUs

Name	Civil Parishes	Notes
Alcester PLU	Alcester, Arrow, Aston Cantlow, Bidford, Coughton, Exhall, Great Alne, Haselor, Ipsley, Kinwarton, Morton Bagot, Oversley, Salford Priors, Sambourn, Spernall, Studley, Weethley, Wixford.	Remainder of PLU in Worcestershire.
Aston PLU	Aston, Curdworth, Minworth, Sutton Coldfield, Wishaw.	
Atherstone PLU	Ansley, Atherstone, Baddesley Ensor, Baxterley, Bentley, Grendon, Hartshill, Mancetter, Merevale, Oldbury, Polesworth.	Remainder of PLU in Leicestershire.
Banbury PLU	Avon Dassett, Farnborough, Mollington, Radway, Ratley & Upton, Shotteswell, Warmington.	Remainder of PLU in Northamptonshire & Oxfordshire.
Birmingham PLP	Birmingham.	
Chipping Norton PLU	Barton on the Heath, Little Compton, Long Compton.	Remainder of PLU in Oxfordshire.
Coventry PLU	Holy Trinity Coventry, St Michael Coventry.	
Foleshill PLU	Ansty, Bedworth, Binley, Exhall, Foleshill, Keresley, Shilton, Stoke, Walsgrave on Sowe, Willenhall, Withybrook, Wyken.	
Hinckley PLU	Burton Hastings, Hinckley (Warwickshire portion), Stretton Baskerville, Wolvey.	Remainder of PLU in Leicestershire.
Kings Norton PLU	Edgbaston.	Remainder of PLU in Staffordshire & Worcestershire.
Lutterworth PLU	Copston Magna, Monks Kirby, Pailton, Stretton under Fosse, Wibtoft, Willey.	Remainder of PLU in Leicestershire & Northamptonshire.
Meriden PLU	Allesley, Berkswell, Bickenhill, Coleshill, Corley, Coundon, Fillongley, Great Packington, Hampton in Arden, Kinwalsey, Lea Marston, Little Packington, Maxtoke, Meriden, Nether Whitacre, Over Whitacre, Sheldon, Shustoke.	
Nuneaton PLU	Arley, Astley, Bulkington, Caldecote, Chilvers Coton, Nuneaton, Weddington.	
Rugby PLU	Bilton, Birdingbury, Bourton & Draycote, Brandon & Bretford, Brinklow, Brownsover, Church Lawford, Churchover, Clifton upon Dunsmore, Combefields, Cosford, Dunchurch, Easenhall, Frankton, Grandborough, Harborough Magna, Hillmorton, Kings Newnham, Leamington Hastings, Little Lawford, Long Lawford, Marton, Newbold on Avon, Newton & Biggin, Princethorpe, Rugby, Ryton on Dunsmore, Stretton on Dunsmore, Thurlaston, Willoughby, Wolfhamcote, Wolston.	Remainder of PLU in Leicestershire & Northamptonshire.
Shipston on Stour PLU	Barcheston, Brailes, Burmington, Butlers Marston, Cherington, Compton Wyniates, Great Wolford, Halford, Honington, Idlicote, Ilmington (Warwickshire portion), Little Wolford, Oxhill, Pillerton Hersey, Pillerton Priors, Stourton, Stretton on the Foss, Sutton under Brailes, Tysoe, Whatoote, Whichford.	Remainder of PLU in Gloucestershire & Worcestershire.
Solihull PLU	Baddesley Clinton, Balsall, Barston, Bushwood, Elmdon, Knowle, Lapworth, Nuthurst, Packwood, Solihull, Tanworth.	Remainder of PLU in Worcestershire.
Southam PLU	Bishop's Itchington, Burton Dassett, Chadshunt, Chapel Ascote, Chesterton & Kingston, Fenny Compton, Gaydon, Harbury, Hodnell, Ladbroke, Lighthorne, Long Itchington, Lower Radbourn, Lower Shuckburgh, Napton on the Hill, Priors Hardwick, Priors Marston, Southam, Stockton, Ufton, Upper Radbourn, Upper Shuckburgh, Watergall, Wills Pastures, Wormleighton.	Remainder of PLU in Northamptonshire.
Stratford on Avon PLU	Alveston, Atherstone upon Stour, Bearley, Beaudesert, Billesley, Binton, Charlecote, Claverdon, Combrook, Compton Verney, Eatington, Fullbrook, Hampton Lucy, Kineton, Langley, Loxley, Luddington, Moreton Morrell, Newbold Pacey, Old Stratford, Preston Bagot, Snitterfield, Stratford on Avon, Temple Grafton, Welford (Warwickshire portion), Wellesbourne Hastings, Wellesbourne Mountford, Weston upon Avon (Warwickshire portion), Whitchurch, Wolverton, Wootton Wawen.	Remainder of PLU in Gloucestershire & Worcestershire.
Tamworth PLU	Amington & Stonydelph, Austrey, Bolehall & Glascote, Kingsbury, Middleton, Newton Regis, Seckington, Shuttington, Tamworth (Warwickshire portion), Tamworth Castle + detached portion, Wilnecote.	Remainder of PLU in Derbyshire & Staffordshire.
Warwick PLU	Ashow, Baginton, Barford, Beausale, Bishop's Tachbrook, Bubbenhall, Budbrooke, Cubbington, Eathorpe, Guy's Cliffe Warwick, Haseley, Hatton, Honiley, Hunningham, Kenilworth, Leamington Priors, Leek Wootton, Lillington, Milverton, Norton Lindsey, Offchurch, Radford Semele, Rowington, Sherborne, Shrewley, St Mary Warwick, St Nicholas Warwick, Stivichall, Stoneleigh, Wappenbury, Wasperton, Weston under Wetherley, Whitnash, Wroxall.	

== Westmorland ==
Link to 1888 map showing Westmorland PLUs; Link to 1910 map showing Westmorland PLUs; Link to 1923 map showing Westmorland PLUs

Name	Civil Parishes	Notes
East Ward PLU	Asby, Bank Moor common to Crosby Ravensworth and Asby (part), Birkbeck Fells common to Crosby Ravensworth and Orton (part), Brough (Intermixed), Brough Sowerby (Intermixed), Crosby Garrett, Dufton, Great Musgrave, Hartley, Hillbeck (Intermixed), Kaber, Kirkby Stephen, Kirkby Thore, Little Musgrave, Long Marton, Mallerstang, Milburn & Milburn Grange, Nateby, Newbiggen, Ormside, Orton + 2 detached portions, Ravenstonedale, Smardale, Soulby, St Lawrence Appleby, St Michael Appleby or Bongate, Stainmore (Intermixed), Temple Sowerby, Undivided Moor Common to Crosby Ravensworth and Orton (part), Waitby, Warcop, Wharton, Winton.	
Kendal PLU	Ambleside, Applethwaite, Barbon, Beetham, Burton in Kendal, Casterton, Crook, Crosthwaite & Lyth, Dillicar, Docker, Farleton, Fawcett Forest, Firbank, Grasmere, Grayrigg, Haverbrack, Helsington, Heversham with Milnthorpe, Hincaster, Holme, Hugill, Hutton Roof, Kendal, Kentmere, Killington, Kirkby Lonsdale, Kirkland, Lambrigg, Langdale, Levens, Long Sleddale, Lupton, Mansergh, Meathop & Ulpha, Middleton, Natland, Nether Graveship, Nether Staveley, New Hutton, Old Hutton with Holmescales, Over Staveley, Patton, Preston Patrick, Preston Richard, Rydal & Loughrigg, Scalthwaiterigg Hay & Hutton in the Hay, Selside & Whitwell, Skelsmerch, Stainton, Strickland Kettle, Strickland Roger, Troutbeck, Underbarrow & Bradley Field, Undermilbeck, Whinfell, Witherslack.	Remainder of PLU in Lancashire.
West Ward PLU	Askham, Bampton, Bank Moor Common to Crosby Ravensworth and Asby (part), Birkbeck Fells Common to Crosby Ravensworth and Orton (part), Bolton, Brougham, Cliburn + detached portion, Clifton, Crosby Ravensworth + 3 detached portions, Great Strickland, Hartsop & Patterdale, High Barton, Kings Meaburn, Little Strickland, Low Winder, Lowther, Martindale, Morland, Newby, Shap, Sleagill, Sockbridge & Tirril, Thrimby, Undivided Moor Common to Crosby Ravensworth and Orton (part), Undivided Moor Common to High Barton, Sockbridge & Tirril and Low Winder, Yanwath & Eamont Bridge.	

== Wiltshire ==
Link to 1888 map showing Wiltshire PLUs; Link to 1909 map showing Wiltshire PLUs; Link to 1928 map showing Wiltshire PLUs

Name	Civil Parishes	Notes
Alderbury PLU	Alderbury, Britford, Clarendon Park, Coombe Bissett, Downton, East Grimstead, Fisherton Anger, Homington, Landford, Langley Wood, Laverstock, Milford, No Man's Land, Nunton & Bodenham, Odstock, Old Sarum, Pitton & Farley, St Edmund Salisbury, St Martin Salisbury, St Thomas Salisbury, Standlynch, Stratford Sub Castle, Stratford Tony, The Close Salisbury, The Earldoms, West Dean, West Grimstead, West Harnham, Whiteparish + detached portion, Winterslow + detached portion.	
Amesbury PLU	Allington, Amesbury, Boscombe, Bulford, Cholderton, Durnford, Durrington, Figheldean, Idmiston, Maddington, Milston, Newton Tony, Orcheston St George, Orcheston St Mary, Rollestone, Shrewton, Tilshead, Wilsford, Winterbourne Dauntsey, Winterbourne Earls, Winterbourne Gunner, Winterbourne Stoke, Woodford.	
Bradford PLU	Bradford on Avon, Broughton Gifford, Cottles, Monkton Farleigh, Westwood, Wingfield.	
Calne PLU	Blackland, Bowood, Bremhill, Calne, Calstone Wellington, Cherhill, Compton Bassett, Heddington, Highway, Hilmarton, Yatesbury.	
Chippenham PLU	Avon, Biddestone, Box, Castle Combe, Christian Malford, Colerene, Corsham, Draycot Cerne, Grittleton, Hardenhuish, Kington Langley, Kington St Michael, Lacock, Langley Burrell, Leigh Delamere, Littleton Drew, Nettleton, North Wraxall, Pewsham, Seagry, Slaughterford, Stanton St Quintin, Sutton Benger, Titherton Kellaways, West Kington, Yatton Keynell.	
Cirencester PLU	Kemble + detached portion, Poole Keynes, Shorncote, Somerford Keynes.	Remainder of PLU in Gloucestershire.
Cricklade & Wootton Bassett PLU	Ashton Keynes, Braydon, Broad Town, Cliffe Pypard, Cricklade St Mary, Cricklade St Sampson, Eisey, Latton, Leigh, Lydiard Millicent, Lydiard Tregoze + detached portion, Lyneham, Marston Meysey, Purton, Tockenham, Wootton Bassett.	
Devizes PLU	All Cannings, Allington, Alton Barnes, Beechingstoke, Bishop's Cannings, Bromham, Chirton, Chittoe, Earl Stoke, Easterton, Etchilhampton, Fullaway, Great Cheverell, Little Cheverell, Marden, Market Lavington, Marston, Patney, Potterne, Poulshot, Rowde, St James Devizes, St John the Baptist Devizes, St Mary the Virgin Devizes, Stanton St Bernard, Stert, Urchfont, West Lavington, Worton.	
Fordingbridge PLU	Martin, South Damerham, Toyd Farm & Allenford, Whitsbury.	Remainder of PLU in Hampshire.
Highworth & Swindon PLU	Bishopstone, Blunsdon St Andrew, Castle Eaton, Chisledon, Draycot Foliat, Hannington + detached portion, Highworth, Inglesham, Liddington, Little Hinton, Rodbourne Chene, Stanton Fitzwarren, Stratton St Margaret, Swindon, Wanborough, Wroughton.	
Hungerford PLU	Aldbourne, Baydon, Buttermere, Chilton Foliat (Wiltshire portion), Froxfield, Great Bedwyn, Ham, Hippenscombe, Hungerford (Wiltshire portion), Little Bedwyn, Ramsbury, Shalbourne (Wiltshire portion).	Remainder of PLU in Hampshire & Berkshire.
Malmesbury PLU	Abbey Malmesbury, Alderton, Brinkworth, Brokenborough, Charlton, Crudwell, Dauntsey, Easton Grey, Foxley, Garsdon, Great Somerford, Hankerton, Hullavington, Lea & Cleverton, Little Somerford, Luckington, Minety, Norton, Oaksey, Sherston Magna, Sherston Parva, Sopworth, St Paul Malmesbury, Westport St Mary.	
Marlborough PLU	Avebury, Berwick Bassett, Broad Hinton, Clatford Park, East Kennett, Fyfield, Mildenhall, North Savernake, Ogbourne St Andrew, Ogbourne St George, Overton Heath, Preshute, South Savernake with Brimslade & Cadley, St Mary Marlborough, St Peter & St Paul Marlborough, West Overton, Winterbourne Bassett, Winterbourne Monkton.	
Melksham PLU	Hilperton, Lands Common to the parishes of Melksham & Broughton Gifford, Melksham, Seend, Semington, Trowbridge, Whaddon.	
Mere PLU	East Knoyle, Kingston Deverhill, Maiden Bradley (Wiltshire portion), Mere, Monkton Deverhill, Sedghill, Stourton (Wiltshire portion), West Knoyle.	Remainder of PLU in Dorset & Somerset.
New Forest PLU	Bramshaw.	Remainder of PLU in Hampshire.
Pewsey PLU	Alton Priors, Burbage, Charlton, Chute, Chute Forest, Collingbourne Ducis, Collingbourne Kingston, Easton, Enford, Everley, Fittleton, Huish, Ludgershall, Manningford Abbots, Manningford Bohun, Manningford Bruce, Milton Lilbourne, Netheravon, North Newnton, North Tidworth, Pewsey, Rushall, Upavon, Wilcot, Wilsford, Woodborough, Wootton Rivers.	
Romsey PLU	Melchet Park, Plaitford, West Wellow.	Remainder of PLU in Hampshire.
Tetbury PLU	Ashley, Long Newnton.	Remainder of PLU in Gloucestershire.
Tisbury PLU	Alvediston, Ansty, Berwick St John, Berwick St Leonard, Chicklade, Chilmark, Donhead St Andrew, Donhead St Mary, East Tisbury, Fonthill Bishop, Fonthill Giffard, Hindon, Semley, Sutton Mandeville, Swallowcliffe, Teffont Evias, Teffont Magna, Tollard Royal, Wardour, West Tisbury.	
Warminster PLU	Bishopstrow, Boyton, Brixton Deverill, Chitterne All Saints, Chitterne St Mary, Codford St Mary, Codford St Peter, Corsley, Heytesbury, Hill Deverhill, Horningsham, Imber, Knook, Longbridge Deverill, Norton Bavant, Sherrington, Stockton, Sutton Veny, Upton Lovell, Upton Scudamore, Warminster.	
Westbury & Whorwellsdown PLU	Bulkington, East Coulston, Edington, Great Hinton, Keevil, North Bradley, Southwick, Steeple Ashton, West Ashton, Westbury.	
Wilton PLU	Barford St Martin, Baverstock, Berwick St James, Bishopstone, Bower Chalke, Broad Chalke, Burcombe, Compton Chamberlain, Dinton, Ebbesborne Wake, Fifield Bavant, Fisherton de la Mere, Fovant, Fugglestone St Peter, Great Wishford, Grovely Wood, Little Langford, Netherhampton, South Newton, Stapleford, Steeple Langford, Wilton, Wylye.	

== Worcestershire ==
Link to 1888 map showing Worcestershire PLUs; Link to 1909 map showing Worcestershire PLUs; Link to 1928 map showing Worcestershire PLUs

Name	Civil Parishes	Notes
Alcester PLU	Abbots Morton, Feckenham, Inkberrow, Oldberrow.	Remainder of PLU in Warwickshire.
Bromsgrove PLU	Alvechurch, Belbroughton, Bentley Pauncefoot, Bromsgrove, Clent, Coston Hackett, Frankley, Grafton Manor, Hagley, Hunnington, Pedmore, Redditch, Romsley, Stoke Prior, Tutnall & Cobley, Webheath.	
Bromyard PLU	Acton Beauchamp, Edvin Loach, Lower Sapey.	Remainder of PLU in Herefordshire.
Cleobury Mortimer PLU	Bayton, Mamble, Rock.	Remainder of PLU in Shropshire.
Droitwich PLU	Claines (part), Crowle, Crutch, Dodderhill, Doverdale, Elmbridge, Elmley Lovett, Hadzor, Hampton Lovett, Hanbury, Hartlebury, Himbleton, Hindlip, Huddington, Martin Hussingtree, Oddingley, Ombersley, Salwarpe, St Andrew Droitwich, St Nicholas Droitwich, St Peter Droitwich, Stock & Bradley, Tibberton, Upper Mitton, Upton Warren, Warndon, Westwood Park, Wrangling Division Droitwich.	
Dudley PLU	Dudley + detached portion.	Remainder of PLU in Staffordshire.
Evesham PLU	Abbots Lench, Aldington, All Saints Evesham, Badsey, Bengeworth, Bretforton, Broadway, Church Honeybourne, Church Lench, Cleeve Prior, Great & Little Hampton, Harvington, North & Middle Littleton, Norton, Offenham, Rous Lench, Sedgeberrow, South Littleton, St Lawrence Evesham, Wickhamford.	Remainder of PLU in Gloucestershire.
Kidderminster PLU	Bewdley, Broom, Chaddesley Corbett, Churchill, Kidderminster Borough, Kidderminster Foreign, Lower Mitton, Ribbesford, Rushock, Stone, Wolverley.	Remainder of PLU in Shropshire & Staffordshire.
Kings Norton PLU	Beoley, King's Norton, Northfield.	Remainder of PLU in Staffordshire & Warwickshire.
Ledbury PLU	Mathon.	Remainder of PLU in Herefordshire.
Martley PLU	Abberley, Alfrick, Areley Kings, Astley, Bransford, Broadwas, Clifton-upon-Teme, Cotheridge, Doddenham, Great Witley, Hallow (part), Hillhampton, Holt, Kenswick, Knightwick, Leigh, Little Witley, Lulsley, Martley, Pensax, Shelsley Beauchamp, Shelsley Kings, Shelsley Walsh, Shrawley, Stanford on Teme, Stockton on Teme, Suckley, Wichenford.	
Newent PLU	Redmarley D’Abitot, Staunton.	Remainder of PLU in Gloucestershire & Herefordshire.
Pershore PLU	Abberton, Besford, Birlingham, Bishampton, Bredicot, Bricklehampton, Broughton Hackett, Charlton, Churchill, Cropthorne, Defford, Dormston, Eckington, Elmley Castle, Fladbury, Flyford Flavell, Grafton Flyford, Great Comberton, Hill & Moor, Holy Cross Pershore, Kington, Little Comberton, Netherton, North Piddle, Norton Beauchamp, Norton juxta Kempsey, Peopleton, Pinvin, Pirton, Spetchley, St Andrew Pershore, Stoulton, Strensham, Throckmorton, Upton Snodsbury, White Ladies Aston, Whittington, Wick, Wyre Piddle.	
Shipston on Stour PLU	Blockley, Shipston on Stour, Tidmington, Tredington.	Remainder of PLU in Gloucestershire & Warwickshire.
Solihull PLU	Yardley.	Remainder of PLU in Warwickshire.
Stourbridge PLU	Cakemore, Cradley, Halesowen, Hasbury, Hawn, Hill, Illey, Lapal, Lutley, Lye, Ridgacre, Stourbridge, Upper Swinford, Wollaston, Wollescote.	Remainder of PLU in Staffordshire.
Stow on the Wold PLU	Daylesford, Evenlode.	Remainder of PLU in Gloucestershire.
Stratford on Avon PLU	Alderminster.	Remainder of PLU in Gloucestershire & Warwickshire.
Tenbury PLU	Bockleton, Eastham, Hanley Child, Hanley William, Knighton on Teme, Kyre Magna, Kyre Parva, Lindridge, Orleton, Rochford, Tenbury.	Remainder of PLU in Herefordshire & Shropshire.
Tewkesbury PLU	Bredon, Bredon's Norton, Chaceley, Conderton, Overbury, Pendock + detached portion, Teddington.	Remainder of PLU in Gloucestershire.
Upton upon Severn PLU	Berrow, Birtsmorton, Bushley, Castlemorton, Croome D’Abitot, Earl's Croome, Eldersfield, Great Malvern, Hanley Castle, Hill Croome, Holdfast, Kempsey, Little Malvern, Longdon, Madresfield, Newland, Powick, Queenhill, Ripple, Severn Stoke, Upton upon Severn, Welland.	
West Bromwich PLU	Oldbury, Warley.	Remainder of PLU in Staffordshire.
Winchcomb PLU	Cutsdean.	Remainder of PLU in Gloucestershire.
Worcester PLU	All Saints Worcester, Blockhouse Worcester, Claines (part), College Precincts Worcester, Hallow (part), St Alban Worcester, St Andrew Worcester, St Clement Worcester, St Helen Worcester, St John Bedwardine Worcester, St Martin Worcester, St Michael Bedwardine Worcester, St Nicholas Worcester, St Peter the Great Worcester, St Swithin Worcester, Whistones Worcester.	

== Yorkshire ==
=== East Riding of Yorkshire ===
Link to 1888 map showing East Riding of Yorkshire PLUs; Link to 1910 map showing East Riding of Yorkshire PLUs; Link to 1927 map showing East Riding of Yorkshire PLUs

Name	Civil Parishes	Notes
Beverley PLU	Aike, Beswick, Bishop Burton, Brantingham, Cherry Burton, Ellerker + detached portion, Elloughton with Brough, Eske, Etton, Holme on the Wolds, Kilnwick juxta Watton, Lands common to Woodmansey and Thearne + 2 detached portions, Leckonfield & Arram, Leven, Lockington + detached portion, Lockington-in-Kilnwick + detached portion, Lund, Meaux, Molescroft, North Newbald, Routh, Rowley, Scorbrough, Skidby, South Cave, South Dalton, South Newbald, St Martin Beverley, St Mary Beverley, St Nicholas Beverley, Storkhill & Sandholme, Thearne + detached portion, Tickton with Hull Bridge, Waghen or Wawne, Walkington, Weel, Woodmansey & Beverley Parks.	
Bridlington PLU	Argam, Auburn, Barmston, Bempton & Newsholm, Bessingby, Boynton, Bridlington, Buckton, Burton Agnes, Carnaby, Dringhoe, Easton, Flamborough, Fordon, Fraisthorpe, Gransmoor, Grindale, Haisthorpe, Hilderthorpe, Hunmanby, Lissett, North Burton, Reighton, Rudston, Sewerby & Marton, Skipsea, Speeton, Thornholme, Thring & Octon, Ulrome, Wilsthorpe, Wold Newton.	
Driffield PLU	Bainton, Beeford, Bracken, Brigham, Butterwick, Cottam, Cowlam, Eastburn, Emswell with Little Driffield, Fimber, Foston on the Wolds, Foxholes & Boythorpe, Garton on the Wolds, Gembling, Great Driffield, Great Kelk, Harpham, Helperthorpe, Hutton Cranswick + detached portion, Kilham, Kirkburn & Battleburn, Langtoft, Little Kelk, Lowthorpe, Luttons Ambo, Middleton on the Wolds, Nafferton, Neswick, North Dalton, North Frodingham, Rotsea, Ruston Parva, Skerne, Southburn, Sunderlandwick, Tibthorpe, Towthorpe, Wansford, Watton, Weaverthorpe, Wetwang.	
Howden PLU	Asselby + 2 detached portions, Aughton, Balkholme + 3 detached portions, Barmby on the Marsh + 3 detached portions, Belby, Bellasize + detached portion, Bishopsoil, Blacktoft, Brackenholme with Woodall, Breighton & Gunby, Bromfleet, Bubwith, Cheapsides, Cotness + 2 detached portions, Eastrington + 2 detached portions, Ellerton, Faxfleet, Foggathorpe, Gilberdike + 3 detached portions, Gribthorpe, Harlthorpe, Hemingbrough, Holme on Spalding Moor, Hotham, Howden + detached portion, Kilpin + 2 detached portions, Knedlington + 3 detached portions, Laxton + 2 detached portions, Laytham, Menthorpe & Bowthorpe, Metham + 2 detached portions, North Cave with Drewton & Everthorpe, Portington + detached portion, Saltmarshe + detached portion, Scalby, Skelton + 2 detached portions, Spaldington, Thorpe + 3 detached portions, Wallingfen, Willitoft, Wressele, Yokefleet + 2 detached portions.	
Kingston upon Hull PLP	Trinity Kingston upon Hull.	
Malton PLU	Acklam with Barthorpe, Birdsall, Burythorpe + detached portion, Duggleby, East Heslerton, Eddlethorpe, Firby, Howsham, Kennythorpe, Kirby Grindalythe, Kirkham, Knapton, Langton, Leavening, Leppington, Menethorpe, North Grimston, Norton, Raisthorpe & Burdale, Rillington, Scagglethorpe, Scampston + detached portion, Settrington, Thirkleby, Thorpe Basset, Vedingham + detached portion, West Heslerton, Westow, Wharram le Street, Wharram Percy, Wintringham.	Remainder of PLU in North Riding of Yorkshire.
Patrington PLU	Burstwick & Skeckling, Burton Pidsea, Easington, Halsham, Hilston, Hollym, Holmpton, Keyingham, Kilnsea, Ottringham, Out Newton, Owstwick, Owthorne, Patrington, Paull or Paghill, Rimswell, Roos, Ryhill & Camerton, Skeffling, South Frodingham, Sunk Island, Thorngumbald, Tunstall, Waxholme, Welwick, Winestead, Withernsea.	
Pocklington PLU	Allerthorpe, Barmby on the Moor, Bielby, Bishop Wilton with Belthorpe + detached portion, Bolton, Bugthorpe, Burnby, East Cottingwith, East Stamford Bridge, Everingham, Fangfoss, Fridaythorpe, Full Sutton, Goodmanham, Great Givendale, Harswell, Hayton, High Catton, Huggate, Kildwick Percy, Kirkby Underdale, Londesbrough & Easthorpe, Low Catton, Market Weighton & Arras, Melbourne, Millington, Newton upon Derwent, North Cliff, Nunburnholme, Owsthorpe, Pocklington, Sancton & Houghton + detached portion, Scrayingham, Seaton Ross, Shipton, Skirpenbeck, South Cliff, Storthwaite, Sutton upon Derwent, Thixendale, Thornton, Thorpe le Street, Waplington, Warter, Wilberfoss, Yapham cum Meltonby, Youlthorpe with Gowthorpe.	
Scarborough PLU	Filey (East Riding portion), Folkton, Ganton with Potter Brompton, Muston, Sherburn, Willerby.	Remainder of PLU in North Riding of Yorkshire.
Sculcoates PLU	Anlaby, Cottingham, Drypool, Garrison Side, Haltemprice, Hedon, Hessle, Kirk Ella + detached portion, Marfleet, Melton, Newington, North Ferriby, Preston + detached portion, Sculcoates, Southcoates, Sutton & Stoneferry, Swanland + detached portion, Wauldby, Welton, West Ella + detached portion, Willerby.	
Selby PLU	Barlby, Cliff cum Lund, Kelfield, North Duffield, Osgodby, Riccall, Skipwith, South Duffield.	Remainder of PLU in West Riding of Yorkshire.
Skirlaugh PLU	Aldbrough, Atwick, Benningholme, Bilton, Bonwick, Brandsburton, Catfoss, Catwick, Coldens Ambo, Coniston, Danthorpe, Dunnington, East Newton, Ellerby, Elstronwick, Fitling, Flinton, Ganstead, Garton with Grimston, Goxhill, Hatfield Magna, Hatfield Parva, Hempholme, Hornsea with Hornsea Burton, Humbleton, Lelley, Long Riston, Mappleton with Rowlston, Marton, Moor Town, North Skirlaugh, Nunkeeling with Bewholme, Rise, Seaton & Wassand, Sigglesthorne, South Skirlaugh, Sproatley, Swine, Thirtleby, West Newton, Withernwick, Wyton.	
York PLU	Deighton, Dunnington, Elvington, Escrick, Gate Fulford (East Riding portion), Grimston, Heslington, Kexby, Langwith, Naburn, Stillingfleet & Moreby, Thorganby & West Cottingwith, Water Fulford, West Stamford Bridge with Scoreby, Wheldrake.	Remainder of PLU in North Riding of Yorkshire & West Riding of Yorkshire.

=== North Riding of Yorkshire ===
Link to 1888 map showing North Riding of Yorkshire PLUs; Link to 1910 map showing North Riding of Yorkshire PLUs; Link to 1928 map showing North Riding of Yorkshire PLUs

Name	Civil Parishes	Notes
Aysgarth PLU	Abbotside Common common to High Abbotside and Low Abbotside + detached portion, Allotment common to Hawes and Bainbridge, Askrigg, Aysgarth, Bainbridge + 3 detached portions, Bishopdale, Burton cum Walden, Carperby cum Thoresby, Hawes + detached portion, Hawes and Bainbridge (Undivided), High Abbotside, Low Abbotside, Newbiggin, Thoralby, Thornton Rust, Wetherfell Peat Ground.	
Bedale PLU	Ainderby Miers with Holtby, Aiskew, Bedale, Burneston, Burrill with Cowling, Burton upon Ure, Carthorpe, Clifton upon Ure, Crakehall, Exelby Leeming & Newton, Firby, Gatenby, Hackforth, Ilton cum Pott + detached portion, Killerby, Kirkby Fleetham, Kirklington-cum-Upsland, Langthorne, Masham, Rand, Rookwith, Scruton, Snape with Thorp, Snape with Thorp and Well (Intermixed), Stirded Pasture, Swainby with Allerthorpe, Swinton with Warthermarske + detached portion, Teakston, Thirn, Thornton Watlass, Well.	
Darlington PLU	Barton, Cleasby, Cliffe, Croft, Dalton upon Tees, Eryholme, Girsby, Manfield, Newton Morrell, Over Dinsdale, Stapleton.	Remainder of PLU in County Durham.
Easingwold PLU	Aldwark, Alne, Angram Grange, Brafferton, Brandsby with Stearsby, Carlton Husthwaite, Coxwold, Crayke, Dalby-cum-Skewsby, Easingwold, Farlington, Flawith, Huby, Husthwaite, Linton-on-Ouse, Marton-in-the-Forest, Myton-on-Swale, Newburgh, Newton-on-Ouse, Oulston, Raskelf, Stillington, Sutton on the Forest, Tholthorpe, Thormanby, Thornton-on-the-Hill, Whenby, Wildon Grange, Yearsley.	
Great Ouseburn PLU	Ellingthorpe, Helperby, Humburton (North Riding portion), Kirkby Hill, Langthorpe, Lower Dunsforth (North Riding portion), Milby (North Riding portion), Norton le Cray, Shipton, Thornton Bridge, Tollerton, Upper Dunsforth with Branton (North Riding portion), Youlton.	Remainder of PLU in West Riding of Yorkshire.
Guisborough PLU	Brotton, Commondale, Danby + 3 detached portions, Danby Low Moor undivided moor common to Danby and Glaisdale + 3 detached portions (part), Easington, Guisborough, Hutton Lowcross, Kilton, Kirkleatham, Liverton, Lofthouse, Marske, Moorsholme, Morton, Newton, Pinchinthorpe, Redcar, Skelton, Skinningrove, Stanghow, Tocketts, Upleatham, Upsell, Westerdale, Wilton.	
Helmsley PLU	Ampleforth, Arden, Beadlam, Bilsdale West, Byland, Byland with Wass, Cawton, Cold Kirby, Coulton, Dale Town, East Newton & Leysthorpe, Gilling, Grimstone, Harome, Hawnby, Helmsley, Laskill Pasture, Murton, Old Byland, Oldstead, Oswaldkirk, Pockley, Rievaulx, Scawton, Snilesworth, Sproxton, Stonegrave, Thorpe le Willows.	
Kirkby Moorside PLU	Appleton le Moor + 2 detached portions, Bransdale East & Farndale West, Bransdale West, East Ness, Fadmoor, Farndale East, Farndale Low Quarter, Gillamoor, Great Edston, Great Edston and Little Edston (Intermixed), Hotton le Hole + 11 detached portions, Kirkby Moorside, Little Edston + detached portion, Muscoates, Newton, Normanby, North Holme, Nunnington, Salton, Skiplam, Spaunton Moor common to Appleton le Moor, Hutton le Hole, Lastingham, Rosedale West and Spaunton + 2 detached portions (part), Thornton Riseborough, Welburn, Wombleton.	
Leyburn PLU	Agglethorpe with Coverham, Akebar, Arrathorne, Barden, Bellerby, Caldbergh with East Scrafton, Carlton Highdale, Carlton Town, Common to Masham and Colsterdale in East Witton Within, Constable Burton, East Bolton, East Hawxwell, East Witton Within, East Witton Without, Ellingstring, Fearby, Fingall, Garriston, Harmby, Healey with Sutton + detached portion, High & Low Ellington, Hornby, Hunton, Hutton Hang, Leyburn, Melmerby, Middleham, Newton-le-Willows, Patrick Brompton, Preston, Redmire, Spennithorne, Thornton Steward, Wensley, West Hawxwell, West Scrafton, West Witton.	
Malton PLU	Airyholme with Howthorpe & Baxton Howe, Amotherby, Appleton-le-Street, Barton le Willows, Barton-le-Street, Brawby, Broughton, Bulmer, Butterwick, Coneysthorpe, Crambe, Foston, Fryton, Ganthorpe, Great Habton, Henderskelfe, Hildenley, Hovingham, Huttons Ambo, Little Habton, New Malton, Old Malton, Ryton, Scackleton, Sheriff Hutton and Lillings Ambo (Intermixed) + detached portion, Sheriff Hutton with Cornbrough + 2 detached portions, Slingsby, South Holme, Stittenham, Swinton, Terrington with Wiganthorpe, Thornton le Clay, Wath, Welburn, Whitwell on the Hill.	Remainder of PLU in East Riding of Yorkshire.
Middlesbrough PLU	Acklam, Eston, Hemlington, Ingleby Barwick, Linthorpe, Maltby, Marton, Middlesbrough, Normanby, Ormesby, Stainton, Thornaby.	
Northallerton PLU	Ainderby Steeple, Appleton upon Wiske, Birkby, Borrowby + detached portion, Brompton + detached portion, Cotcliffe, Crosby, Danby Wiske, Deighton, East Cowton, East Harlsey, Ellerbeck, Great Langton, Great Smeaton, Gueldable + detached portion, Hornby, Hutton Bonville, Kiplin, Landmoth with Catto, Lazenby, Leake, Little Langton, Little Smeaton, Morton upon Swale, Nether Silton, North Otterington, Northallerton, Osmotherley, Over Silton, Romanby, Sigston, South Cowton, Sowerby under Cotcliffe, Thimbleby, Thornton le Beans, Thrintoft + detached portion, Warlaby, Welbury, West Harlsey, West Rounton, Whitwell, Winton, Yafforth + detached portion.	
Pickering PLU	Aislaby + 2 detached portions, Allerston, Barughs Ambo, Cawthorn, Cropton, Ebberston, Hartoft, Kingthorpe, Kirkby Misperton, Lastingham + 2 detached portions, Levisham, Lockton, Marishes, Marton, Middleton, Newton, Pickering, Rosedale East, Rosedale West, Sinnington, Spaunton + 4 detached portions, Spaunton Moor common to Appleton le Moor, Hutton le Hole, Lastingham, Rosedale West and Spaunton + 2 detached portions (part), Thornton Dale, Wilton, Wrelton + 2 detached portions.	
Reeth PLU	Arkengarthdale, Ellerton, Grinton, Marrick, Melbecks, Muker, Reeth.	
Richmond PLU	Aldbrough, Appleton, Aske, Bolton upon Swale, Brompton upon Swale, Brough, Caldwell, Carkin & Forcett, Catterick, Colburn, Common to Kirkby on the Hill, Ravensworth and Whashton + 4 detached portions, Dalton, Downholme, Easby, East Layton, Ellerton upon Swale, Eppleby, Gayles, Gilling, Hipswell, Hudswell, Kirkby on the Hill, Marske, Melsonby, Middleton Tyas, Moulton, New Forest, Newsham, North Cowton, Ravensworth, Richmond, Scorton, Scotton, Skeeby, St Martins, Stainton, Stanwick, Tunstall, Uckerby, Walburn, West Layton, Whashton.	
Ripon PLU	Asenby, Baldersby, Cundall & Leckby, Dishforth, East Tanfield, Howgrave, Hutton Conyers, Marton le Moor, Melmerby, Middleton Quernhowe, Norton Conyers, Rainton with Newby, Sutton Howgrave, Wath, West Tanfield.	Remainder of PLU in West Riding of Yorkshire.
Scarborough PLU	Brompton, Broxa, Burniston, Cayton, Cloughton, East Ayton, Falsgrave, Filey (North Riding portion), Gristhorpe, Hackness, Harwood Dale, Hutton Bushel, Irton, Lebberston, Scalby, Scarborough, Seamer, Silpho, Snainton, Staintondale, Suffield cum Everley, Throxenby, Troutsdale, West Ayton, Wykeham.	Remainder of PLU in East Riding of Yorkshire.
Stokesley PLU	Bilsdale Midcable, Broughton, Carlton, Castle Levington, Crathorne, Easby, East Rounton, Faceby, Great Ayton, Great Busby, High Worsall, Hilton, Hutton juxta Rudby, Ingleby Arncliffe, Ingleby Greenhow, Kildale, Kirk Levington, Kirkby, Little Ayton + detached portion, Little Busby, Low Worsall, Middleton upon Leven, Newby, Nunthorpe, Pickton, Potto, Rudby, Seamer, Sexhow, Skutterskelf, Stokesley, Whorlton, Yarm.	
Teesdale PLU	Barforth, Barningham, Boldron, Bowes, Brignall, Cotherstone, Egglestone Abbey, Gilmonby, Great Hutton, Holwick, Hope, Hunderthwaite, Lartington, Lune, Mickleton, Ovington, Rokeby, Romaldkirk, Scargill, Startporth, Wycliffe.	Remainder of PLU in County Durham.
Thirsk PLU	Ainderby Quernhow, Bagby, Balk, Birdforth, Boltby, Borrowby (3 detached portions), Carlton Miniott, Catton, Cowesby, Dalton, Eldmire with Crakehill, Fawdington, Felixkirk, Holme, Hood Grange, Howe, Hutton Sessay, Kepwick, Kilburn, Kirby Knowle, Kirkby Wiske, Knayton with Brawith, Maunby, Newby Wiske, Newsham with Breckenbrough, North Kilvington, Pickhill with Roxby, Sandhutton, Sessay, Sinderby, Skipton-on-Swale, South Kilvington, South Otterington, Sowerby, Sutton-under-Whitestonecliffe + detached portion, Thirkleby, Thirlby, Thirsk + detached portion, Thornbrough, Thornton-le-Moor, Thornton-le-Street, Topcliffe, Upsall.	
Whitby PLU	Aislaby, Barnby, Borrowby, Danby Low Moor undivided moor common to Danby and Glaisdale + 3 detached portions (part), Eckdaleside cum Ugglebarnby, Egton, Ellerby, Fylingdales, Fylingdales Moor common to Hawsker cum Stainsacre and Fylingdales, Glaisdale + 3 detached portions, Goathland, Hawsker cum Stainsacre, Hinderwell, Hutton Mulgrave, Lythe, Mickleby, Newholm cum Dunsley, Newton Mulgrave, Rousby, Ruswarp, Sneaton, Ugthorpe, Wheeldale Moor, Whitby.	
York PLU	Beningbrough, Buttercrambe, Claxton, Clifton (North Riding portion), Earswick, Flaxton, Gate Helmsley, Harton, Haxby, Heworth (North Riding portion), Holtby, Huntington, Lillings Ambo + detached portion, Murton, Osbaldwick, Over or Upper Helmsley, Overton, Rawcliffe, Sand Hutton, Sheriff Hutton and Lillings Ambo (Intermixed) + 5 detached portions, Skelton + detached portion, Stockton on the Forest, Strensall, Towthorpe, Warthill, Wigginton.	Remainder of PLU in East Riding of Yorkshire & West Riding of Yorkshire.

=== West Riding of Yorkshire ===
Link to 1888 map showing West Riding of Yorkshire PLUs; Link to 1927 map showing West Riding of Yorkshire - South PLUs; Link to 1927 map showing West Riding of Yorkshire - North PLUs

Name	Civil Parishes	Notes
Barnsley PLU	Ardsley, Barnsley, Barugh, Billingley, Carlton, Cudworth, Darfield, Darton, Dodworth, Monk Bretton + detached portion, Nether Hoyland, Notton, Royston, Stainborough, Wombwell, Woolley, Worsborough.	
Bradford PLU	Bolton, Bowling, Bradford, Horton, Manningham.	
Bramley PLU	Armley, Bramley, Farnley, Gildersome, Wortley.	
Clitheroe PLU	Bashall Eaves, Bolton by Bowland + detached portion, Easington + detached portion, Forest of Bowland Higher Division, Forest of Bowland Lower Division + 2 detached portions, Gisburn + detached portion, Gisburn Forest, Grindleton, Horton near Gisburn, Middop, Mitton, Newsholme, Newton in Bowland, Paythorne, Rimington, Sawley + detached portion, Slaidburn, Waddington, West Bradford.	Remainder of PLU in Lancashire.
Dewsbury PLU	Batley, Dewsbury, Gomersall, Heckmondwike, Liversedge, Lower Whitley, Mirfield, Morley, Ossett cum Gawthorpe, Soothill, Thornhill.	
Doncaster PLU	Adwick le Street, Adwick upon Dearne, Armthorpe, Askern, Auckley (West Riding portion), Austerfield, Balby with Hexthorpe, Barnbrough, Barnby upon Don, Bentley with Arksey, Bilham, Blaxton, Bolton upon Dearne, Braithwell, Brodsworth, Burghwallis, Cadeby, Campsall, Cantley, Carr House & Elm Field, Clayton with Frickley, Conisbrough, Denaby, Doncaster, Edlington, Fenwick, Hampole, Hickleton, Hooton Pagnell, Kirk Bramwith, Kirk Sandall, Loversall, Marr, Melton on the Hill, Mexborough, Moss, Norton, Owston, Rossington, Skellow, Sprolbrough, Stainton, Stotfold, Sutton, Thorpe in Balne, Thurnscoe, Tickhill, Wadworth, Warmsworth, Wheatley.	Remainder of PLU in Nottinghamshire.
Ecclesall Bierlow PLU	Ecclesall Bierlow, Heeley, Nether Hallam + 2 detached portions, Upper Hallam.	Remainder of PLU in Derbyshire.
Goole PLU	Adlingfleet, Armin, Eastoft, Fockerby, Goole, Gowdall, Haldenby, Hook, Ousefleet, Pollington, Rawcliffe, Snaith & Cowick, Swinfleet & Reedness, Whitgift.	Remainder of PLU in Lincolnshire.
Great Ouseburn PLU	Acomb, Aldborough + detached portion, Allerton Mauleverer with Hopperton, Arkendale, Boroughbridge, Cattal, Clareton, Copgrove, Great Ouseburn, Great Ribston with Walshford, Green Hammerton, Hessay, Humburton (West Riding portion), Hunsingore, Kirk Hammerton, Kirkby Hall, Knapton, Little Ouseburn, Lower Dunsforth (West Riding portion), Marton with Grafton, Milby (West Riding portion), Minskip, Moor Monkton, Nether, Nun Monkton, Poppleton, Roecliffe, Rufforth, Skelton, Staveley, Thornville, Thorpe Underwoods, Upper Dunsforth with Branton (West Riding portion), Upper Poppleton, Westwick, Whixley, Widdington.	Remainder of PLU in North Riding of Yorkshire.
Halifax PLU	Barkisland, Clifton, Eland cum Greetland, Fixby, Halifax, Hartshead, Hipperholme with Brighouse, Midgley, Norland, Northowram, Ovenden, Rastrick, Rishworth, Shelf, Skircoat, Southowram, Sowerby + detached portion, Soyland, Stainland, Warley.	
Hemsworth PLU	Ackworth, Badsworth, Brierly, Hamphall Stuss, Havercroft with Cold Hiendley, Hemsworth, Hessle & Hill Top, Houghton Magna, Houghton Parva, Huntwick with Foulby & Nostel, Kirk Smeaton, Little Smeaton + detached portion, North Elmsall, Ryhill, Shafton, Skelbrooke, South Elmsall, South Hiendley, South Kirkby, Thorpe Audlin, Upton, Walden Stubbs, West Hardwick, Wintersett.	
Holbeck PLU	Beeston, Churwell, Holbeck.	
Huddersfield PLU	Almondbury, Austonley + 2 detached portions, Cartworth, Cumberworth, Dalton, Farnley Tyas, Foolstone, Golcar, Hepworth, Holme, Honley, Huddersfield, Kirkburton, Kirkheaton, Lepton, Lindley cum Quarmby, Lingards, Linthwaite, Lockwood, Longwood + detached portion, Marsden in Almondbury, Marsden in Huddersfield + detached portion, Meltham, Nether Thong, Scammonden, Shelley, Shepley, Skelmanthorpe, Slaithwaite, South Grosland, Thurstonland, Upper Thong, Upper Whitley, Wooldale + detached portion.	
Hunslet PLU	Holbeck Middleton, Hunslet + detached portion, Oulton with Woodlesford, Rothwell, Temple Newsam, Thorpe Stapleton.	
Keighley PLU	Bingley, Haworth, Keighley, Morton East & West, Steeton with Eastburn, Sutton.	
Knaresborough PLU	Bilton with Harrogate, Brearton, Burton Leonard, Farnham, Felliscliffe, Ferrensby, Flaxby, Follifoot, Goldsborough, Hampsthwaite, Haverah Park, Killinghall, Knaresborough, Nidd + detached portion, Pannal, Plompton, Ripley, Scotton, Scriven with Tentergate, Stainley with Cayton, Walkingham Hill with Ockany.	
Leeds PLU	Chapel Allerton, Headingley cum Burley, Leeds, Potter Newton, Roundhay, Seacroft.	
North Bierley PLU	Allerton, Calverley with Farsley, Clayton, Cleckheaton, Drighlington, Eccleshill, Heaton, Hunsworth, Idle, North Bierley, Pudsey + detached portion, Shipley, Thornton, Tong, Wike, Wilsden.	
Pateley Bridge PLU	Bewerley, Birstwith, Bishop Thornton, Clint, Dacre, Fountains Earth, Hartwith cum Winsley, High & Low Bishopside, Menwith with Darley, Stonebeck Down, Stonebeck Up, Thornthwaite with Padside, Thruscross, Warsill.	
Peniston PLU	Cawthorne, Denby, Gunthwaite, High Hoyland, Hoyland Swaine, Hunshelf, Ingbirchworth, Kexbrough, Langsett, Oxspring, Peniston, Silkstone, Thurgoland, Thurlstone, West Clayton.	
Pontefract PLU	Ackton, Anshelf, Arleton, Baln, Beaghall, Birkin, Brotherton, Burton Salmon, Byram cum Poole, Castleford, Cradling Stubbs, Darrington, East Hardwick, Egbrough, Fairburn, Featherstone, Ferry Fryston, Ferry Fryston or Ferrybridge, Heck + detached portion, Hensall, Hillam, Houghton, Huddleston cum Lumby (detached portion), Kellington, Knottingley, Methley, Monk Fryston + 2 detached portions, Monkhill, Pontefract + 2 detached portions, Pontefract Park, Purston Jaglin, Snydale, Stapleton, Sutton, Whitley, Whitwood, Womersley.	
Ripon PLU	Aismunderby with Bondgate, Aldfield, Azerley, Bishop Monkton, Bridge Hewick, Clotherholme, Common to Laverton and Galphay + detached portion, Copt Hewick, Eavestone, Givendale, Grantley, Grewelthorpe, Ingerthorpe + detached portion, Kitkby Malzeard, Lands common to Grewelthorpe and Kitkby Malzeard, Laverton, Lindrick, Markingfield Hall, Markington with Wallerthwaite, Newby with Mulwith, North Stainley with Sleningford, Nunwick with Howgrave + detached portion, Ripon, Sawley + detached portion, Sharow, Skelden, Studley Roger, Sutton, Whitcliffe with Littlethorpe + detached portion, Winksley.	Remainder of PLU in North Riding of Yorkshire.
Rotherham PLU	Aston cum Aughton, Bramley, Brampton Bierlow, Brampton en le Morthen, Brinsworth, Catcliffe, Dalton, Greasbrough, Hooton Levitt, Hooton Roberts, Kimberworth, Laughton en le Morthen, Maltby, Orgreave, Ravenfield, Rawmarsh, Rotherham, Swinton, Thrybergh, Tinsley, Treeton, Ulley, Wath upon Dearne, Wentworth, Whiston, Wickersley.	Remainder of PLU in Derbyshire.
Saddleworth PLP	Saddleworth.	
Sedbergh PLU	Dent, Garsdale, Sedbergh.	
Selby PLU	Barlow, Biggin, Brayton + detached portion, Burn, Camblesforth, Carlton, Cawood, Chapel Haddlesey, Drax, Gateforth, Hambleton, Hirst Courtney, Little Fenton, Long Drax, Newland, Selby, Temple Hurst, Thorpe Willoughby, West Haddlesey, Wistow.	Remainder of PLU in East Riding of Yorkshire.
Settle PLU	Arncliffe, Austwick, Bentham, Burton in Longsdale, Clapham cum Newby, Giggleswick, Halton Gill, Halton West, Hanlith, Hawkswick, Hellifield, Horton in Ribblesdale, Ingleton, Kirkby Malham, Langcliffe, Lawkland, Litton, Long Preston, Malham, Malham Moor, Nappa, Otterburn, Rathmell, Scosthrop, Settle, Stainforth, Swinden, Thornton in Lonsdale, Tosside + detached portion, Wigglesworth.	
Sheffield PLU	Attercliffe cum Darnall, Brightside Bierlow, Handsworth, Sheffield + detached portion.	
Skipton PLU	Addingham, Appletreewick, Bank Newton, Barden, Barnoldswick, Beamsley, Bolton Abbey, Bordley, Bracewell, Bradleys Both, Brogden + detached portion, Broughton, Buckden, Burnsall, Calton, Carlton, Coates, Coniston Cold, Conistone with Kilnsey, Cononley, Cowling, Cracoe, Draughton, Elslack, Embsay with Eastby, Eshton, Farnhill, Flasby with Winterburn, Gargrave, Glusburn, Grassington, Halton East, Hartlington, Hazlewood with Storriths, Hebden, Hetton, Kettlewell with Starbotton, Kildwick, Land common to Burnsall and Thorpe, Linton, Marton in Craven, Rilstone, Salterforth, Silsden, Skipton, Stirton with Thorlby, Thornton in Craven, Thorpe, Threshfield.	
Tadcaster PLU	Aberford, Acaster Selby, Allerton Bywater, Appleton Roebuck, Askham Bryan, Austhorpe + detached portion, Barkston, Barwick in Elmet, Bilbrough, Bolton Percy, Catterton, Church Fenton, Colton, Garforth, Great & Little Preston, Grimston, Healaugh, Huddleston cum Lumby + detached portion, Kippax, Kirkby cum Milford, Lead, Ledstone, Lotherton cum Aberford, Micklefield, Newthorpe, Newton cum Toulston, Oxton, Parlington, Ryther with Ossendyke, Saxton cum Scarthingwell, Sherburn, South Milford, Steeton, Sturton, Swillington, Tadcaster East, Tadcaster West, Towton, Ulleskelf.	
Thorne PLU	Crowle (West Riding portion), Fishlake, Hatfield, Stainforth, Sykehouse, Thorne.	Remainder of PLU in Lincolnshire.
Todmorden PLU	Erringden, Heptonstall, Langfield, Stansfield, Wadsworth.	Remainder of PLU in Lancashire.
Wakefield PLU	Altofts, Alverthorpe with Thornes, Chevet, Crigglestone, Crofton, East Ardsley, Emley, Flockton, Horbury, Lofthouse with Carlton, Newland + 3 detached portions, Normanton, Sandal Magna, Sharlston, Shitlington, Stanley cum Wrenthorpe, Thorpe, Wakefield, Walton, Warmfield cum Heath, West Ardsley, West Bretton.	
Wetherby PLU	Angram, Bardsey cum Rigton, Bickerton, Bilton, Bramham cum Oglethorpe, Clifford cum Boston, Collingham, Cowthorpe, Dunkeswick, East Keswick, Harewood, Hutton, Kereby with Netherby, Kirk Deighton, Kirkby Overblow including Swinden, Linton, Little Ribston, Marston, Micklethwaite, North Deighton, Rigton, Scarcroft, Shadwell, Sicklinghall, Spofforth with Stockeld, Thornier, Thorp Arch, Tockwith, Walton, Wardley, Weeton, Wetherby, Wighill, Wigton, Wike, Wilstrop, Wothersome.	
Wharfedale PLU	Addle cum Eccup, Alwoodley, Arthington, Askwith, Baildon, Blubberhouses, Bramhope, Burley in Wharfedale, Carlton, Castley, Clifton with Norwood, Denton, Esholt, Farnley, Fewston, Hawksworth, Horsforth, Ilkley, Lindley, Menston, Middleton, Nesfield with Langbar, Newall with Clifton, Otley, Poole + detached portion, Rawden, Stainburn, Timble Great, Timble Little, Weston, Yeadon.	
Worksop PLU	Dinnington, Firbeck, Gildingwells, Harthill with Woodhall, Letwell, North & South Anston, Thorpe Salvin, Throapham, Todwick, Wales, Wallingwells (West Riding portion), Woodsetts.	Remainder of PLU in Derbyshire & Nottinghamshire.
Wortley PLU	Bradfield, Ecclesfield, Tankersley, Wortley.	
York PLU	Acaster Malbis York, All Saints North Street York, All Saints Pavement York, Askham Richard, Bishopthorpe York, Clifton (West Riding portion), Copmanthorpe York, Davy Hall York, Drinkhouses + detached portion, Gate Fulford (West Riding portion), Heworth (West Riding portion), Holgate, Middlethorpe, Minster Yard with Bedern York + detached portion, Mint Yard York, St Andrew York, St Crux York, St Cuthbert with St Helen on the Walls & All Saints Peasholme York, St Dennis York, St George York, St Giles York, St Helen on the Walls York + detached portion, St Helen Stonegate York, St John Delpike York, St John Micklegate York, St Lawrence York, St Margaret York, St Martin Coney Street York, St Martin cum Gregory York, St Mary Bishophill Junior York + 2 detached portions, St Mary Bishophill Senior York, St Mary Castlegate including York Castle, St Maurice York, St Michael le Belfrey York + 3 detached portions, St Michael Spurrier Gate York, St Nicholas York, St Olave Marygate York, St Peter le Willows York, St Peter the Little York, St Sampson York, St Saviour York + 3 detached portions, St Wilfred York, Trinity Goodramgate York, Trinity Kings Court York, Trinity Micklegate York.	Remainder of PLU in East Riding of Yorkshire & North Riding of Yorkshire.
