= Shelsleys =

Group of small villages in England

Coordinates: 52.2739°N 2.4117°W

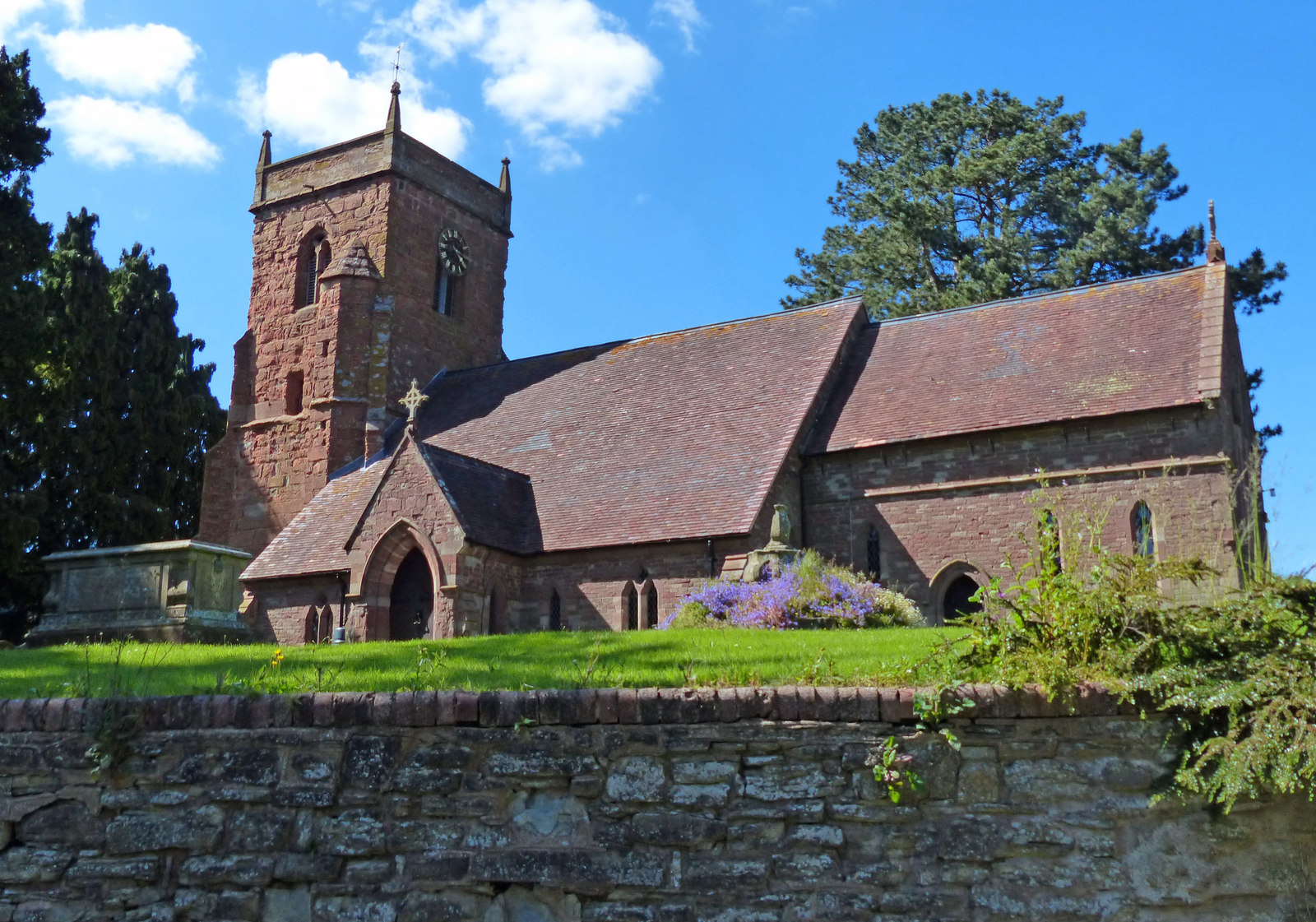
All Saints' Church, Shelsley Beauchamp

Shelsleys

The Shelsleys is an area in the Malvern Hills District of Worcestershire, England. The area straddles the River Teme near the village of Clifton upon Teme. The Shelsleys appear to have anciently been comprised in one territory, but fragmented into separate manors and parishes in medieval times. Shelsley Beauchamp and Shelsley Walsh had both become parishes by the 13th century. Shelsley Kings was part of the parish of Shelsley Beauchamp until 1866 when it became a separate civil parish, whilst remaining part of the ecclesiastical parish of Shelsley Beauchamp.

The two ecclesiastical parishes of Shelsley Beauchamp and Shelsley Walsh were merged into a new ecclesiastical parish called The Shelsleys in 1972. For civil purposes, Shelsley Beauchamp, Shelsley Kings, and Shelsley Walsh remain three separate civil parishes, but they now share a grouped parish council.

At the 2021 census, the populations of the three civil parishes were 238 in Shelsley Beauchamp, 189 in Shelsley Kings and 31 in Shelsley Walsh, giving a total population of 458 for the area served by The Shelsleys Parish Council.

== History ==
The name Shelsley includes the Old English "ley" meaning a clearing in a wood. The first element of the name is less certain; it may be "sceldu" meaning shallow or "sceld" meaning a shield or sheltered place.

The Domesday Book of 1086 lists two manors at Shelsley, which was in the Doddingtree hundred of Worcestershire. By the early 13th century, these two manors were owned by the Beauchamp family and the Walsh family, and so became known as Shelsley Beauchamp (or Great Shelsley) east of the River Teme, and Shelsley Walsh (or Little Shelsley) west of the Teme.

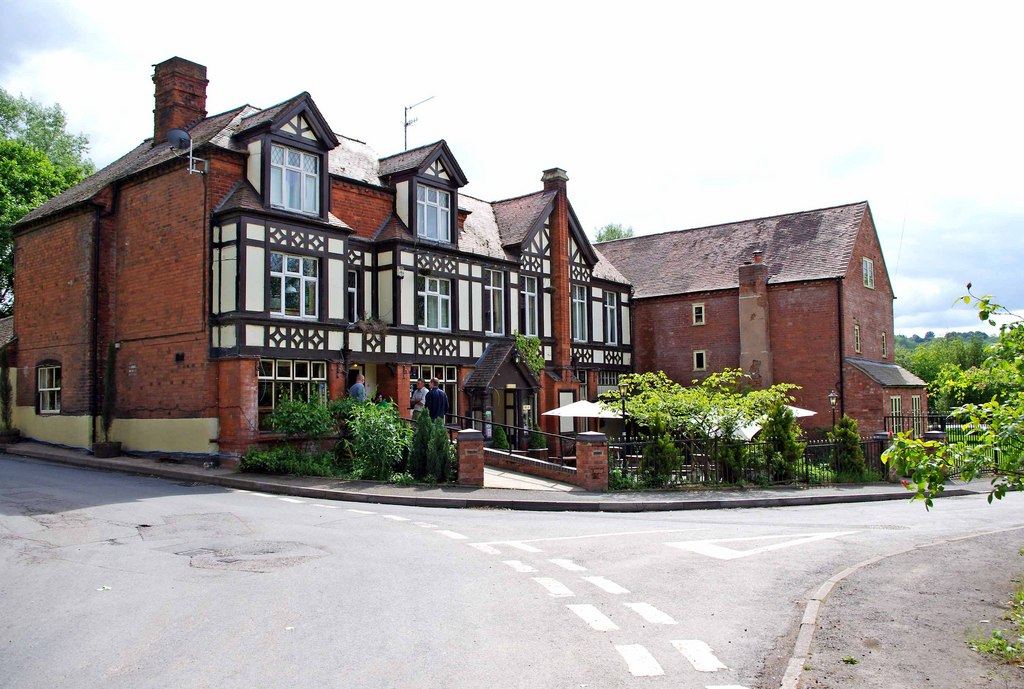
The Bridge Hotel at Stanford Bridge in the parish of Shelsley Kings

The Shelsley Kings area was not part of either of the Shelsley manors, but instead formed a detached part of the manor of Martley, which was owned directly by the king at the time of the Domesday Book and remained in royal ownership until 1196.

In terms of parishes, Shelsley Beachamp and Shelsley Kings were anciently part of the parish of Martley. There was a chapel of ease at Shelsley Beauchamp by 1194, when the lord of the manor, Simon Beauchamp, managed to get the chapel raised to the status of a parish church, making Shelsley Beauchamp a separate parish from Martley. There were disputes for many years afterwards about whether the parish of Shelsley Beauchamp only covered the manor, or whether it also included the Shelsley Kings area to the north. An agreement was eventually reached in 1420, which confirmed that the Shelsley Kings area was part of the parish of Shelsley Beauchamp, but that two thirds of the tithes collected from Shelsley Kings should be paid to the rector of Martley and only one third paid to the rector of Shelsley Beauchamp. The oldest part of All Saints' Church at Shelsley Beauchamp today is the tower, added in the 14th century; the rest of the church was rebuilt in 1846–1847.

The pattern of treating Shelsley Kings differently from the rest of Shelsley Beauchamp parish continued when parishes were given various civil functions under the poor laws from the 17th century onwards. Poor law functions were administered separately for Shelsley Kings and the rest of Shelsley Beauchamp parish. As such, Shelsley Kings became a separate civil parish in 1866 when the legal definition of 'parish' was changed to be the areas used for administering the poor laws. Despite becoming a separate civil parish, Shelsley Kings remained part of the ecclesiastical parish of Shelsley Beauchamp after 1866.

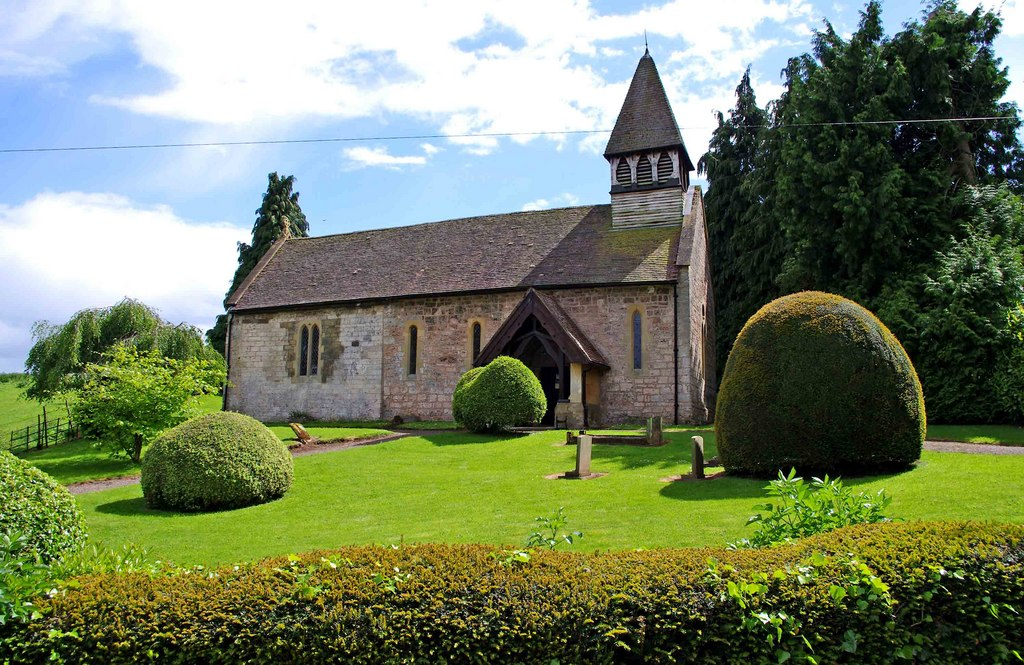
St Andrew's Church, Shelsley Walsh

Shelsley Walsh has its own church, dedicated to St Andrew, which was built in the early 12th century. Shelsley Walsh had certainly become a parish by 1287, with its advowson owned by the Walsh family who also owned the manor. As late as 1535 the parish was paying an annual pension to the rector of Clifton upon Teme, which may indicate that Shelsley Walsh had anciently been part of that parish. St Andrew's stands next to Court House, the manor house of the Walsh family. The oldest part of the current house dates from the 16th century.

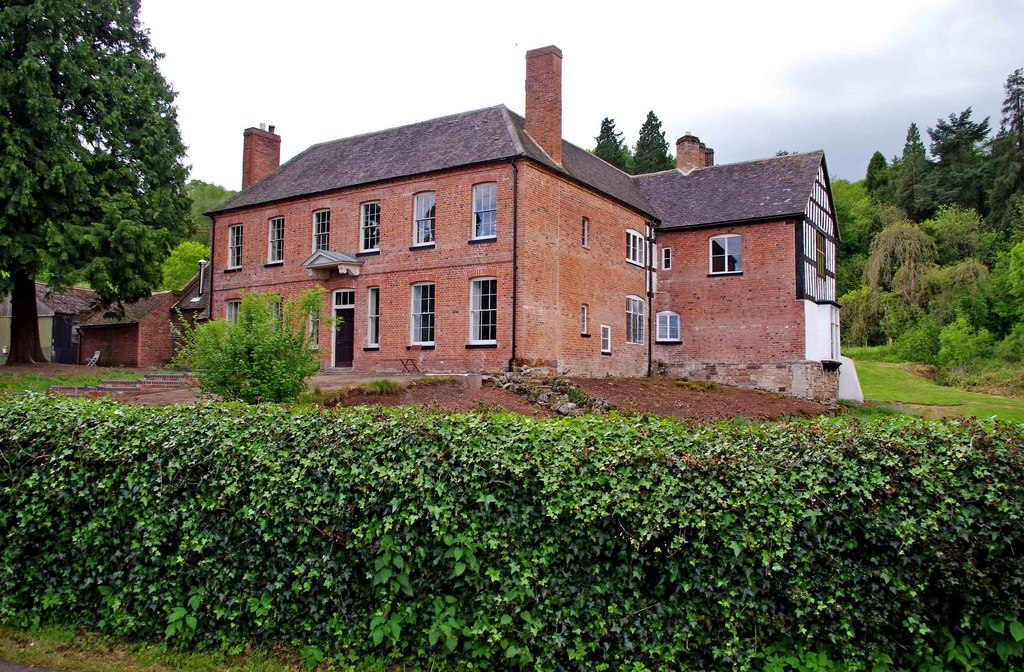
Court House, Shelsley Walsh

Charles Nott, the parson of Shelsley Beauchamp, was a leader of the Clubmen who in 1645 drew up the Woodbury Declaration, which listed the grievances that local people had at the behaviour of Royalist forces in the area.

From 1836, Shelsey Beauchamp, Shelsley Kings and Shelsley Walsh were all included in the Martley Poor Law Union, created under the Poor Law Amendment Act 1834 to collectively deliver certain aspects of the poor laws, including the provision of a workhouse to serve the area at Martley.

The ecclesiastical parishes of Shelsley Beauchamp (which included Shelsley Kings) and Shelsley Walsh were united into a single ecclesiastical parish called The Shelsleys in 1972.

== Governance ==
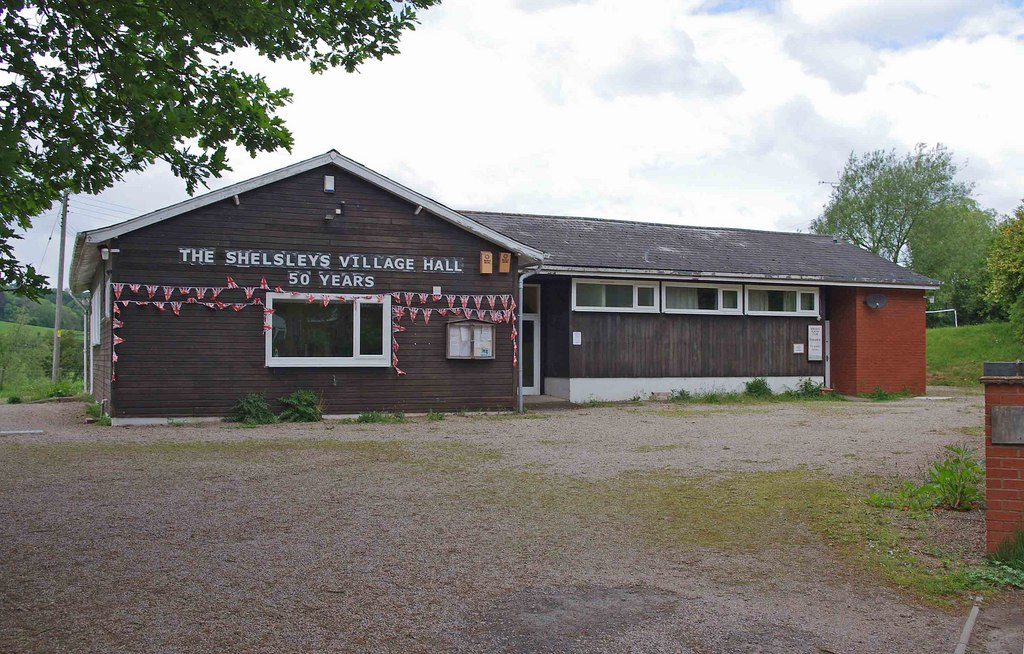
The Shelsleys Village Hall, Shelsley Beauchamp

There are three tiers of local government covering the Shelsleys, at parish, district and county level: The Shelsleys Parish Council, Malvern Hills District Council, and Worcestershire County Council. The parish council is a grouped parish council, covering the three civil parishes of Shelsley Beauchamp, Shelsley Kings, and Shelsley Walsh. It meets at the village hall in Shelsley Beauchamp.
