= Little Witley =

Village in Worcestershire, England

Coordinates: 52.27166°N 2.317188°W

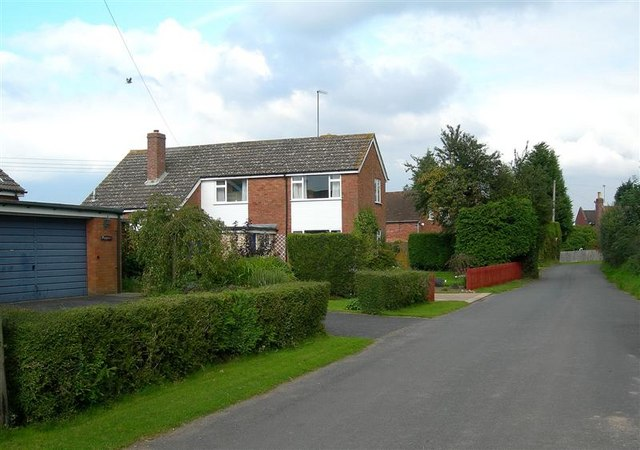
- Little Witley

- Location within Worcestershire
- OS grid reference: SO784637
- Civil parish: Little Witley
- District: Malvern Hills
- Shire county: Worcestershire
- Region: West Midlands
- Country: England
- Sovereign state: United Kingdom
- Post town: WORCESTER
- Postcode district: WR6
- Police: West Mercia
- Fire: Hereford and Worcester
- Ambulance: West Midlands
- UK Parliament: West Worcestershire

Little Witley is a village and civil parish in the Malvern Hills District in the county of Worcestershire, England.

== History ==
=== Pre-history ===
There has been little if any evidence of early human activity in Little Witley, however Neolithic, Bronze Age and Iron Age finds have been made in neighbouring Holt.

Field-walking has produced evidence of Roman occupation to the west of Little Witley village. More recently two brooches have been discovered in the vicinity of the village. A Roman milestone survived into the eighth century at the boundary between Holt and Little Witley parishes. It was located on the military road, Herepathe in Anglo-Saxon charters, known as Straete that led from Worcester, through Hallow and Grimley, to an as yet unidentified western fort or outpost. Further evidence of the presence of the Roman military in the area is found in Shrawley, where three circular crop-marks mark the position of a marching camp overlooking Shrawley Brook.

=== Early Middle Ages ===
Worcestershire has one of the most complete and ancient collections of Anglo-Saxon charters that detail the grants of estates by the church and crown. Wick Episcopi was an area to the Northwest of Worcester, roughly bounded by the Rivers Severn and Teme and a line through Broadwas, Martley, Wichenford, Little Witley and Shrawley Brook. The manors (later parishes) within Wick Episcopi where defined during that period. Whitlega = bend of a stream with a clearing (Witley) was first recognised at that time. Other locations named in the Wick Episcopi grant of 775 include, Ecles Broc (stream from Warford Pool) and Doferic (Shrawley Brook). The Buttinge tribe or family occupied the area that was later to become Witley Park.

Other locations in Holt named in the Wick Episcopi grant of 775 include Heafuchrycg (Ockeridge), Doferic (Shrawley Brook), Saeferne (the Severn) and Baele Broc (Babbling Brook = Grimley Brook). Hallow, in 816, was one of the first single manors to be granted to a tenant lord by the Bishopric of Worcester. Before that it had been part of a larger estate, Worgorena league (the clearing of the people of Worcester), which also included Little Witley. The clearing concerned would have been in the southern portion of the still extensive but retreating Wyre forest. Slades, ridges and copses mentioned in the grant would have been around Witley Park and to the west of Little Witley village.

Bishop Oswald of Worcester (961–992) decided to reform the financing of the church by leasing more of its lands. He formed Oswaldslow Hundred, a 'triple hundred', in 964 by the authority of King Edgar. Oswaldslow was created by the merging of Cuthburgelow, Winburgetreow and Wulfereslaw Hundreds. Witleage (Little Witley) was mentioned in the charter.

Eadmaer received a further grant in 969 when he took on four 'mansi', or hides, at Witleah (Little Witley). The boundaries included all of Witley and the remaining part of Bentley, probably in the area of Ockeridge Wood. This association of the two manors was repeated on subsequent grants. Little Witley's prefix was unnecessary as Great Witley did not come into existence until much later (post Domesday survey). The charter of 969 describes Witley as forested with open-fields, the latter presumably in the stream valleys.

=== Later Middle Ages ===
In 1017 Archbishop Wulfstan of Worcester granted the six hide Beonetleah (Bentley in Holt) with Witley manor to his brother, Aelfwige.

Earnig/Ernwy, a Dane and priest of Edric the Wild, acquired the manor of Witleaege (Witley) sometime before the Norman Conquest. Ralph de Bernay forcibly removed the estate from Earnig but it did not return to the church on his imprisonment. Little Witley was mentioned in the Domesday Survey of 1086 when Urse d'Abetot, Sheriff of Worcestershire, held one hide (30 acres. He let one plough to Walter Ponther. There was a resident priest, two smallholders and a second plough in the manor. The woodland was three by two furlongs (60 acres). Both before the conquest and in 1086 the taxable value was 10s(15s in another contemporary source).

The history of Little Witley church is somewhat obscure. It was not a parish church at the time of the Conquest but a chapelry of St. Helens in Worcester. It apparently did not have a font or burial ground until 1375 when application was made to the mother church, as the parish church of Holt was 2 miles (3.2 km) distant and the road, especially in winter, 'watery and muddy'. The church that stands today was rebuilt in 1867, although a blocked doorway in the north end of the nave is said to date from the early thirteenth century. Some of the foundation courses of the current building may be equally as old. The 'new' church was designed by Abraham Edward Perkins, Worcester's church architect.

Little Witley manor passed to the Beauchamp family when Emeline de Abitot, the daughter and heiress of Urse d'Abetot, married Walter de Beauchamp then owner of Elmley Castle. Walter's father Hugh (Hugue) de Beauchamp, had been the companion in arms of William the Conqueror and obtained large estates in Hertfordshire, Buckinghamshire, and Bedfordshire. He was the founder of the house of Beauchamp.

In 1287 Little Witley manor was appended to Great Witley manor, which was under the Cooksey family, as part of a marriage trust agreement.

=== Recent times ===
A Cooksey heiress was married to Sir William Russell of Strensham in 1499, and Great Witley manor remained in Russell hands for over a hundred and fifty years. The Russells replaced the thirteenth century manor house at Great Witley with a grander edifice that was to later develop into Witley Court. Little Witley manor followed the descendancy of Great Witley manor until the twentieth century when the estate was broken up and sold off in 1920.

Following the Poor Law Amendment Act 1834 Little Witley Parish ceased to be responsible for maintaining the poor in its parish. This responsibility was transferred to Martley Poor Law Union.
