= Martley Poor Law Union =

Poor Law Union in Worcestershire, England

Following the Poor Law Amendment Act 1834 individual parishes ceased to be responsible for maintaining the poor in their parish. Poor law unions were established. In west Worcestershire the Martley Poor Law Union was established to take the poor from the following parishes Abberley, Alfrick, Astley, Bransford, Broadwas, Clifton-upon-Teme, Cotheridge, Doddenham, Great Witley, Grimley, Hallow, Holt, Knightwick, Leigh, Little Witley, Lulsley, Martley, Pensax, Shelsley Beauchamp, Shelsley Kings, Shelsley Walsh, Shrawley, Suckley and Wichenford.
