= Pensax =

Coordinates: 52.31840°N 2.40779°W

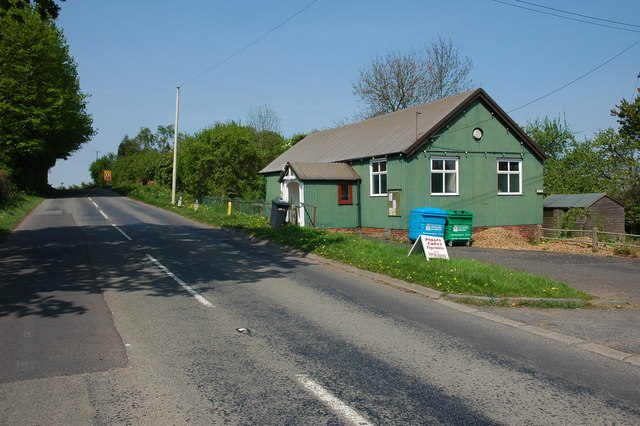
- Pensax Parish Hall

- Location within Worcestershire
- Population: 308
- OS grid reference: SO723690
- Civil parish: Pensax
- District: Malvern Hills
- Shire county: Worcestershire
- Region: West Midlands
- Country: England
- Sovereign state: United Kingdom
- Post town: WORCESTER
- Postcode district: WR6
- Police: West Mercia
- Fire: Hereford and Worcester
- Ambulance: West Midlands

Pensax is a village and civil parish of northwest Worcestershire in England, incorporating the hamlet of Menith Wood to the west of Pensax Common. In 2021, the parish had a population of 308.

Pensax borders the parishes of Stockton-on-Teme, Abberley, Rock and Lindridge. Pensax is home to a parish church dedicated to St. James the Great, built in 1832. A local primary school, Pensax Church of England school, closed in 2003. A small village hall, which opened in 1911, was closed in 2020.

== History ==
The name Pensax is a combination of the Celtic words "pen" (hilltop) and "sais" (Englishman, Saxon). Unlike many English place names with Celtic elements, the modifier follows the basic noun, as is customary in Celtic languages. This indicates that Brittonic speakers coined the name, rather than Old English speakers borrowing a Brittonic element.

The close village of Menith Wood also has a Celtic name meaning mountain/hill, this time derived from the Welsh language word "mynydd". Nearby, too, lies the River Teme, whose name comes from the Celtic "tamesis" (the dark one), the same as the rivers Thames and Tame. All of this points to a strong Celtic speaking population having still resided in this area after the Anglo Saxons migrated into the region and took over the local government.

Following the Poor Law Amendment Act 1834 Pensax Parish ceased to be responsible for maintaining the poor in its parish. This responsibility was transferred to Martley Poor Law Union.

For local government purposes Pensax forms part of the district of Malvern Hills.
