= Berrington, Worcestershire =

Village in Worcestershire, England

Coordinates: 52.303°N 2.633°W

Berrington
- Location within Worcestershire
- OS grid reference: SO568674
- Civil parish: Tenbury
- District: Malvern Hills
- Shire county: Worcestershire
- Region: West Midlands
- Country: England
- Sovereign state: United Kingdom
- Post town: Tenbury Wells
- Postcode district: WR15
- Dialling code: 01584
- Police: West Mercia
- Fire: Hereford and Worcester
- Ambulance: West Midlands
- UK Parliament: West Worcestershire

Berrington is a village in Worcestershire, England.

Berrington was in the upper division of Doddingtree hundred.
