= Shelsley Beauchamp =

Village in Worcestershire, England

Coordinates: 52.263°N 2.395°W

- Civil parish
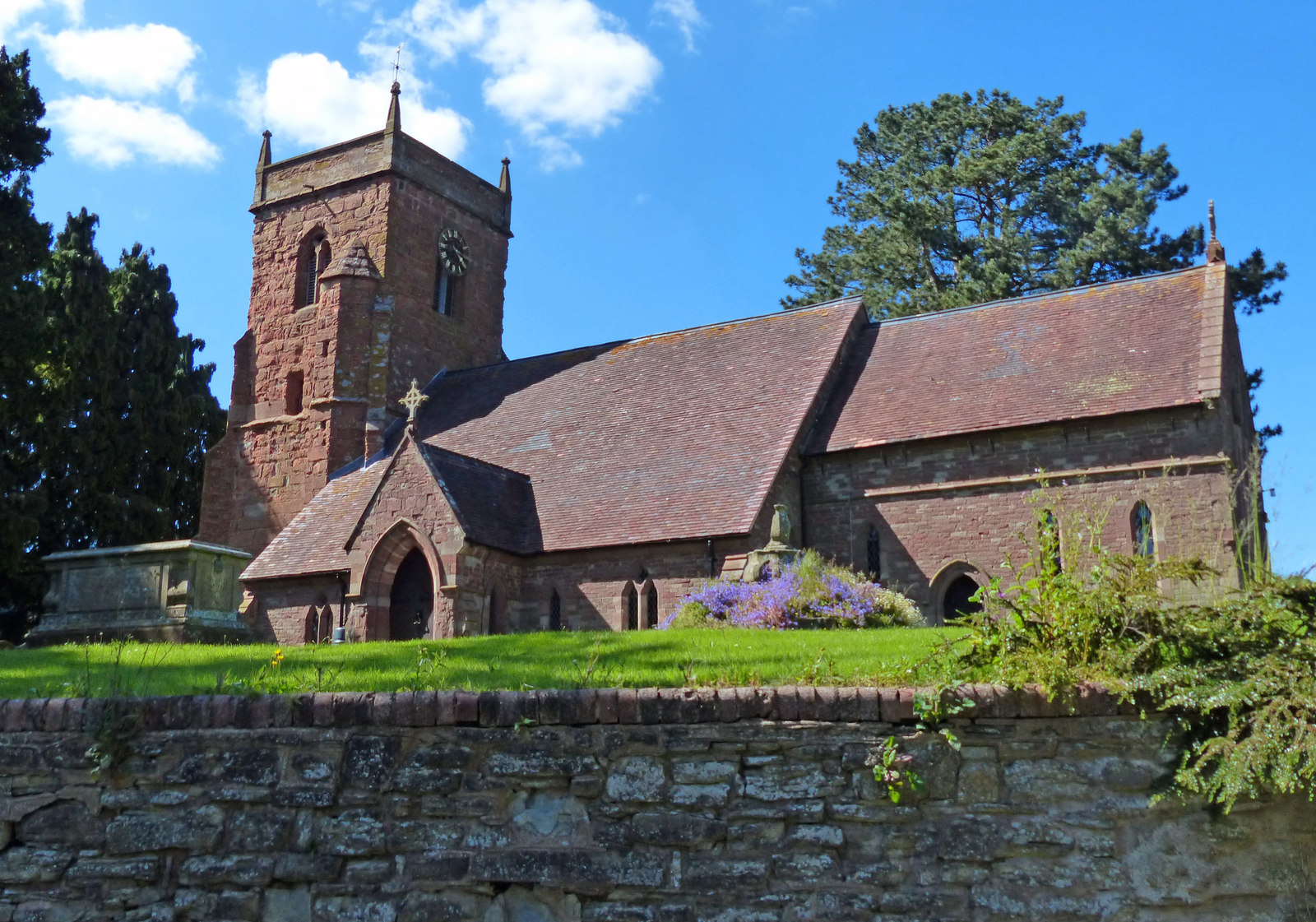
- All Saints' Church

- Location within Worcestershire
- Area: 5.09 km^{2} (1.97 sq mi)
- Population: 238 (Parish, 2021)
  - Density: 47/km^{2} (120/sq mi)
- Civil parish: Shelsley Beauchamp
- District: Malvern Hills
- Shire county: Worcestershire
- Region: West Midlands
- Country: England
- Sovereign state: United Kingdom
- Post town: Worcester
- Postcode district: WR6
- Police: West Mercia
- Fire: Hereford and Worcester
- Ambulance: West Midlands

Shelsley Beauchamp is a village and civil parish in the Malvern Hills district of Worcestershire, England. It lies 9 miles (14 km) north-west of Worcester. At the 2021 census the parish had a population of 238. It shares a grouped parish council with the neighbouring parishes of Shelsley Kings and Shelsley Walsh, which are collectively known as the Shelsleys.

== History ==
The name Shelsley includes the Old English "ley" meaning a clearing in a wood. The first element of the name is less certain; it may be "sceldu" meaning shallow or "sceld" meaning a shield or sheltered place. The Beauchamp part of the name comes from the Beauchamp family who owned the manor in the 12th century.

The Domesday Book of 1086 lists two manors at Shelsley, which was in the Doddingtree hundred of Worcestershire. By the early 13th century, these two manors were owned by the Beauchamp family and the Walsh family, and so became known as Shelsley Beauchamp (or Great Shelsley) east of the River Teme, and Shelsley Walsh (or Little Shelsley) west of the Teme.

The Shelsley Kings area was not part of either of the Shelsley manors, but instead formed a detached part of the manor of Martley, which was owned directly by the king at the time of the Domesday Book and remained in royal ownership until 1196.

In terms of parishes, Shelsley Beachamp and Shelsley Kings were anciently part of the parish of Martley. There was a chapel of ease at Shelsley Beauchamp by 1194, when the lord of the manor, Simon Beauchamp, managed to get the chapel raised to the status of a parish church, making Shelsley Beauchamp a separate parish from Martley. There were disputes for many years afterwards about whether the parish of Shelsley Beauchamp only covered the manor, or whether it also included the Shelsley Kings area to the north. An agreement was eventually reached in 1420, which confirmed that the Shelsley Kings area was part of the parish of Shelsley Beauchamp, but that two thirds of the tithes collected from Shelsley Kings should be paid to the rector of Martley and only one third paid to the rector of Shelsley Beauchamp. The oldest part of All Saints' Church at Shelsley Beauchamp today is the tower, added in the 14th century; the rest of the church was rebuilt in 1846–1847.

The pattern of treating Shelsley Kings differently from the rest of Shelsley Beauchamp parish continued when parishes were given various civil functions under the poor laws from the 17th century onwards. Poor law functions were administered separately for Shelsley Kings and the rest of Shelsley Beauchamp parish. As such, Shelsley Kings became a separate civil parish in 1866 when the legal definition of 'parish' was changed to be the areas used for administering the poor laws. Despite becoming a separate civil parish, Shelsley Kings remained part of the ecclesiastical parish of Shelsley Beauchamp after 1866.

From 1836, Shelsey Beauchamp, Shelsley Kings and Shelsley Walsh were all included in the Martley Poor Law Union, created under the Poor Law Amendment Act 1834 to collectively deliver certain aspects of the poor laws, including the provision of a workhouse to serve the area at Martley.

The ecclesiastical parishes of Shelsley Beauchamp (which included Shelsley Kings) and Shelsley Walsh were united into a single ecclesiastical parish called The Shelsleys in 1972.

There are 23 listed buildings in Shelsley Beauchamp.

== Governance ==
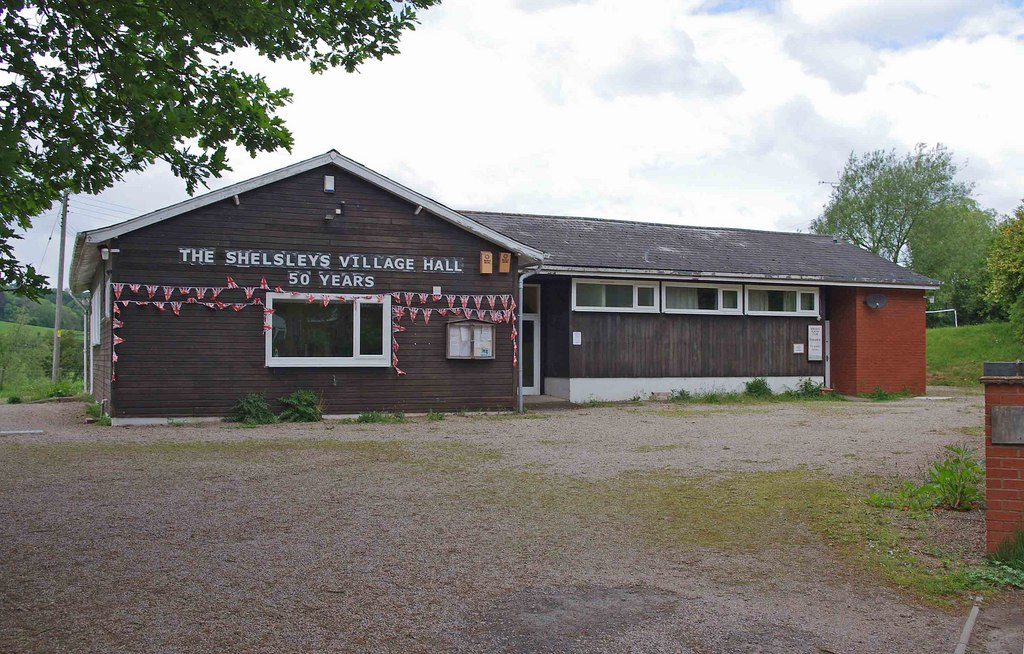
The Shelsleys Village Hall, Shelsley Beauchamp

There are three tiers of local government covering the Shelsleys, at parish, district and county level: The Shelsleys Parish Council, Malvern Hills District Council, and Worcestershire County Council. The parish council is a grouped parish council, covering the three civil parishes of Shelsley Beauchamp, Shelsley Kings, and Shelsley Walsh. It meets at the village hall in Shelsley Beauchamp.
