= The Chantry School =

Coordinates: 52.23826°N 2.357823°W

The Chantry School (Martley Worcestershire)
- Martley, Worcestershire, WR6 6QA; England

Information
- Type: Academy
- Established: Reopened 1963
- Local authority: Worcestershire
- Specialist: Technology
- Department for Education URN: 136897 Tables
- Ofsted: Reports
- Chairperson: Paul Wilcox
- Head teacher: Nicola Clear
- Gender: Mixed
- Age: 11 to 16
- Enrolment: 900
- Colour: Red/Black
- Website: http://www.chantryschool.com

The Chantry School is a mixed gender secondary school with academy status located in Martley, Worcestershire, England. The school has about 900 students on roll who come mainly from small villages around the edge of Worcester, The school has a Technology College specialism.

== History ==
The Chantry High school was established in 1963, moving from its former early 19th century (1846) building across the road. The name changed to the Chantry School after becoming an academy in 2012.

In 2007 there was a notable case where a past instructor Ian Wood was found guilty of possession of two indecent images of children on his computer and a short clip of a child rape.

A July 2023 Ofsted report awarded the school a Grade 2 (Good). The Chantry School was named in Tatler magazine's top 20 state schools guide for 2018.

== Notable alumni ==
- Nigel Slater (b. 1956), food writer and broadcaster.
- Kit Harington (b. 1986), actor.
- Luke Narraway (b. 1983), rugby player. He only attended Chantry High School from 1995 to 1998 before leaving to attend King's School, Worcester.
