= 2023 Malvern Hills District Council election =

2023 English local election

- 4 May 2023

All 31 seats to Malvern Hills District Council 16 seats needed for a majority

	First party	Second party	Third party
Leader	Tom Wells	Jeremy Owenson	Jules Wood
Party	Independent	Conservative	Green
Last election	10 seats, 22.2%	13 seats, 28.9%	5 seats, 11.0%
Seats before	13	12	5
Seats won	11	7	7
Seat change	▲1	▼6	▲2
Popular vote	10,470	11,538	7,394
Percentage	25.7%	28.3%	18.2%
Swing	▲3.5%	▼0.6%	▲7.2%
	Fourth party	Fifth party	Sixth party
Leader	Kaleem Aksar	Sarah Rouse
Party	Liberal Democrats	MH Independents	Labour
Last election	9 seats, 27.6%	N/A	1 seat, 6.9%
Seats before	4	3	1
Seats won	3	3	0
Seat change	▼6	▲3	▼1
Popular vote	6,635	2,759	1,717
Percentage	16.3%	6.8%	4.2%
Swing	▼11.3%	N/A	▼2.7%
- Winner of each seat at the 2023 Malvern Hills District Council election
Leader before election
Tom Wells
Independent
No overall control
Leader after election
Tom Wells
Independent
No overall control

The 2023 Malvern Hills District Council election took place on 4 May 2023 to elect members of Malvern Hills District Council in Worcestershire, England. This was on the same day as other local elections in England.

New ward boundaries came into effect for this election, reducing the number of seats on the council from 38 to 31.

== Summary ==
Prior to the election the council was under no overall control, being led by a coalition of the independents and Greens, led by independent councillor Tom Wells. The Liberal Democrats had also been part of the ruling coalition following the 2019 election, but withdrew from it in 2020. There had also been a split amongst the independent councillors in 2022 which led to the formation of a new group called the Malvern Hills Independents, which subsequently registered itself as a political party with the Electoral Commission.

Following the election the council remained under no overall control. The independents and Greens both increased their numbers of seats, largely at the expense of the Conservatives, and the independent and Green coalition continued to run the council.

The Liberal Democrat group leader prior to the election, Kaleem Aksar, did not stand for re-election. They chose Paul Bennett as their new group leader after the election.

=== Election result ===
2023 Malvern Hills District Council election
Party	Candidates	Seats	Gains	Losses	Net gain/loss	Seats %	Votes %	Votes	+/−
Independent	17	11	2	0	▲6	35.5	25.7	10,470	+3.5
Conservative	26	7	0	1	▼8	22.6	28.3	11,538	–0.6
Green	12	7	1	0	▲2	22.6	18.2	7,394	+7.2
Liberal Democrats	21	3	0	2	▼6	9.7	16.3	6,635	–11.3
Malvern Hills Independents	4	3				9.7	6.8	2,759	N/A
Labour	6	0	0	0	▼1	0.0	4.2	1,717	–2.7
Reform	2	0	0	0	Steady	0.0	0.5	202	N/A

== Ward results ==
The Statement of Persons Nominated, which details the candidates standing in each ward, was released by Malvern Hills District Council following the close of nominations on 5 April 2023. The results for each ward were as follows, with an asterisk (*) indicating an incumbent councillor standing for re-election.

=== Alfrick, Leigh & Rushwick ===
Alfrick, Leigh & Rushwick (2 seats)
Party	Candidate	Votes	%
MH Independents	Sarah Rouse*	1,030	71.0
MH Independents	Peter Whatley*	992	68.4
Conservative	Paul Selway-Swift	300	20.7
Liberal Democrats	Linda Hardwick	239	16.5
Turnout		1,451	37.2
Registered electors		3,902	
MH Independents win (new seat)			
MH Independents win (new seat)			

=== Baldwin ===
Baldwin (2 seats)
Party	Candidate	Votes	%	±%
Conservative	Pamela Cumming*	905	62.6	–15.0
Conservative	Paul Cumming*	902	62.4	N/A
Liberal Democrats	Jamie Cramp	436	30.2	+7.8
Green	Seyi Latunde-Dada	382	26.4	N/A
Turnout		1,445	37.7	
Registered electors		3,833		
Conservative hold				
Conservative win (new seat)				

=== Barnards Green ===
Barnards Green (3 seats)
Party	Candidate	Votes	%
Green	Mark Driscoll	786	36.5
Green	Malcolm Victory	772	35.9
Liberal Democrats	David Mead	755	35.1
Liberal Democrats	Clive Fletcher	596	27.7
Liberal Democrats	Pete Benkwitz	521	24.2
Conservative	Ian Hopwood	463	21.5
Conservative	Julie Maclusky	423	19.7
Independent	Adrian Vines	376	17.5
Labour	Louise Lowton	369	17.2
Labour	Iain Dawson	307	14.3
Independent	Nick Houghton	296	13.8
Turnout		2,151	33.2
Registered electors		6,488	
Green win (new seat)			
Green win (new seat)			
Liberal Democrats win (new seat)			

=== Broadheath ===
Broadheath
Party	Candidate	Votes	%	±%
Independent	Daniel Walton*	511	76.8	+25.5
Conservative	Carl Fordington	131	19.7	–10.7
Liberal Democrats	Chris Sandys	23	3.5	–14.8
Majority		380	57.1	N/A
Turnout		666	43.27	
Registered electors		1,539		
Independent hold				

=== Castlemorton, Welland & Wells ===
Castlemorton, Welland & Wells (2 seats)
Party	Candidate	Votes	%
Independent	John Gallagher*	864	48.1
Independent	Christine Wild	727	40.4
Conservative	Jill Campbell	587	32.6
Liberal Democrats	Eva Fielding	550	30.6
Conservative	Marc Bayliss	489	27.2
Turnout		1,798	42.5
Registered electors		4,230	
Independent win (new seat)			
Independent win (new seat)			

=== Great Malvern ===
Great Malvern (2 seats)
Party	Candidate	Votes	%
Independent	Beverley Nielsen*	798	50.4
Independent	Cynthia Palmer*	726	45.8
Conservative	Hannah Campbell	491	31.0
Liberal Democrats	Jed Marson	458	28.9
Conservative	James Jarvis	425	26.8
Turnout		1,584	40.5
Registered electors		3,915	
Independent win (new seat)			
Independent win (new seat)			

=== Hallow & Holt ===
Hallow & Holt
Party	Candidate	Votes	%
Independent	Dean Clarke*	495	59.4
Conservative	Mel Fordington	264	31.7
Liberal Democrats	Elaine Drage	74	8.9
Majority		231	27.7
Turnout		836	37.6
Registered electors		2,221	
Independent win (new seat)			

=== Kempsey ===
Kempsey (2 seats)
Party	Candidate	Votes	%	±%
Independent	David Harrison*	917	67.3	–15.9
Independent	John Michael*	665	48.8	–30.9
Conservative	Ian Daly	548	40.2	+28.6
Liberal Democrats	John Drage	218	16.0	+7.9
Turnout		1,362	34.5	
Registered electors		3,946		
Independent hold				
Independent hold				

=== Lindridge ===
Lindridge
Party	Candidate	Votes	%	±%
Conservative	Douglas Godwin*	479	64.9	–3.6
Green	Mary-Louise Thompson	159	21.5	N/A
Liberal Democrats	John O'Loghlen	100	13.6	–17.9
Majority		320	43.4	
Turnout		745	35.4	
Registered electors		2,103		
Conservative hold				

=== Link ===
Link (3 seats)
Party	Candidate	Votes	%	±%
Independent	Kwai Chan*	589	28.7	N/A
Liberal Democrats	Neville Mills*	568	27.7	–10.2
Green	Fran Victory	563	27.5	N/A
Liberal Democrats	Danielle Bennett	527	25.7	–19.0
Conservative	David Watkins	504	24.6	–1.5
Liberal Democrats	Clifford Hobbs	467	22.8	–14.2
Conservative	Karen Hanks	442	21.6	–3.7
Labour	Susan Dalley	437	21.3	+3.1
Labour	Christopher Burrows	429	20.9	+4.1
Independent	Clive Hooper	305	14.9	N/A
Independent	Anne Robinson	285	13.9	N/A
Reform	Richard Case	141	6.9	N/A
Turnout		2,050	36.0	
Registered electors		5,701		
Independent gain from Liberal Democrats				
Liberal Democrats hold				
Green gain from Liberal Democrats				

=== Longdon ===
Longdon
Party	Candidate	Votes	%	±%
Conservative	Jennie Watkins	461	60.3	–1.8
Green	Tim Kershaw	161	21.0	N/A
Liberal Democrats	Liz Smith	143	18.7	–19.2
Majority		300	39.3	
Turnout		767	39.6	
Registered electors		1,938		
Conservative hold				

=== Martley ===
Martley
Party	Candidate	Votes	%	±%
Conservative	Barbara Jones-Williams*	504	58.7	–13.6
Liberal Democrats	John Bateman	197	22.9	N/A
Independent	George Wilesmith	105	12.2	N/A
MH Independents	Matthew Oliver	53	6.2	N/A
Majority		307	35.8	
Turnout		864	37.1	
Registered electors		2,327		
Conservative hold				

=== Pickersleigh ===
Pickersleigh
Party	Candidate	Votes	%	±%
Liberal Democrats	Paul Bennett*	212	45.5	–5.8
Conservative	David Chambers	104	22.3	–2.1
Labour	Owen Walters	84	18.0	–6.3
Independent	Caroline Bovey*	66	14.2	N/A
Majority		108	23.2	
Turnout		470	23.4	
Registered electors		2,011		
Liberal Democrats hold		Swing	▼1.9	

=== Powick & the Hanleys ===
Powick & the Hanleys (2 seats)
Party	Candidate	Votes	%
Independent	Tom Wells*	1,461	78.9
Independent	Kathy Wells*	1,283	69.3
Conservative	Sebastian Barbour	365	19.7
Conservative	Oliver Watkins	250	13.5
Liberal Democrats	Rachel Aksar	158	8.5
Turnout		1,851	43.0
Registered electors		4,303	
Independent win (new seat)			
Independent win (new seat)			

=== Tenbury ===
Tenbury (2 seats)
Party	Candidate	Votes	%	±%
MH Independents	Lesley Bruton*	684	57.1	N/A
Conservative	Andrew Willmott	605	50.5	N/A
Conservative	Paul Owen	367	30.6	N/A
Green	Peter Jones	331	27.6	N/A
Turnout		1,198	33.0	N/A
Registered electors		3,626		
MH Independents gain from Conservative				
Conservative hold				

=== Upper Howsell ===
Upper Howsell
Party	Candidate	Votes	%
Green	Jules Wood*	335	54.8
Conservative	Surbjit Brierley	146	23.9
Labour	Jan Blazak	91	14.9
Liberal Democrats	Will Chaundy	39	6.4
Majority		189	30.9
Turnout		615	28.3
Registered electors		2,176	
Green win (new seat)			

=== Upton & Ripple ===
Upton & Ripple (2 seats)
Party	Candidate	Votes	%
Green	Martin Allen*	1,172	71.4
Conservative	Jeremy Owenson	608	37.1
Conservative	Andrew Waddell	463	28.2
Green	Rebecca Rollinson	459	28.0
Liberal Democrats	Liz Mills	143	8.7
Reform	Doug Guest	61	3.7
Turnout		1,641	42.0
Registered electors		3,912	
Green win (new seat)			
Conservative win (new seat)			

=== West ===
West (2 seats)
Party	Candidate	Votes	%	±%
Green	Natalie McVey*	1,152	74.3	+2.3
Green	John Raine*	1,122	72.3	–4.5
Conservative	Jennie Kelly	312	20.1	+0.8
Liberal Democrats	Richard Whitehead	211	13.6	–1.0
Turnout		1,551	37.6	
Registered electors		4,128		
Green hold				
Green hold				

== Changes 2023–2027 ==
- Beverley Nielsen, elected as an independent councillor for Great Malvern, joined the Labour Party in August 2024, before leaving it in April 2026 to sit as an independent again in the Democratic Independent group.
- Kathy Wells and Tom Wells (Powick & the Hanleys) and Kwai Hung Chan (Link), all elected as independents and sitting in the Democratic Independent group, left that group in 2026 to form a Green and Independent Alliance with the Green Party.
- Martin Allen, elected as a Green councillor for Upton & Ripple, defected to the Liberal Democrats in August 2026, citing his loss of faith in Green leader Zack Polanski's judgement.

== By-elections ==
=== Tenbury ===
A by-election was held after the resignation of Conservative councillor Andrew Willmott.

Tenbury by-election: 30 April 2026
Party	Candidate	Votes	%	±%
Reform	Duane Hubbard	687	45.1	N/A
Conservative	Carl Fordington	461	30.3	−20.2
Liberal Democrats	Jed Marson	193	12.7	N/A
Green	Sam Lewis	182	12.0	N/A
Turnout		1,525	40.6	+7.6
Rejected ballots		2		
Registered electors		3,760		
Reform gain from Conservative				

=== Alfrick, Leigh & Rushwick ===
A by-election was held after the resignation of Malvern Hills Independents councillor Peter Whatley.

Alfrick, Leigh & Rushwick by-election: 21 May 2026
Party	Candidate	Votes	%	±%
Liberal Democrats	Chris McSweeny	452	25.8	+9.3
Conservative	Seb Barbour	391	22.3	+1.6
Reform	Max Windsor-Peplow	340	19.4	N/A
Independent	Tom Clarke	296	16.9	N/A
Green	Charlie Anderton	190	10.8	N/A
Independent	Matt Oliver	83	4.7	N/A
Turnout		1,752	37.8	+0.6
Rejected ballots		0		
Registered electors		4,636		
Liberal Democrats gain from MH Independents				
