= Luke Narraway =

England international rugby union player

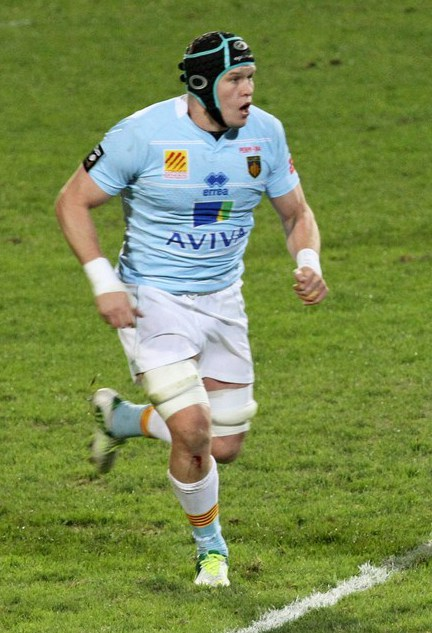
- Born: Luke James Narraway; 7 September 1983 (age 43) Worcester, England
- Height: 1.90 m (6 ft 3 in)
- Weight: 106 kg (16 st 10 lb)
- School: Chantry High School (Worcestershire); The King's School, Worcester

Rugby union career
- Position(s): Number Eight, Flanker
Senior career
Years	Team	Apps	(Points)
2003–2012	Gloucester	178	(80)
2012–2014	USA Perpignan	49	(10)
2014–2017	London Irish	63	(10)
2017–2018	Coventry	24	(5)
2025–2026	Matson RFC	1	(10)
International career
Years	Team	Apps	(Points)
2006-2009	England Saxons		
2008-2009	England	7	(0)
- Correct as of 24 May 2018

Luke Narraway (born 7 September 1983 in Worcester) is a rugby union coach and former player, he played for London Irish until the end of the 2016–2017 season before joining Coventry as a player—coach for the 2017–2018 season. He is currently forwards coach at Dragons.

== Club career ==
Narraway joined Gloucester Rugby from The King's School, Worcester after 4 years at The Chantry High School, Worcestershire. The back-row forward made his first team debut for Gloucester away at Leeds Carnegie in the Zurich Premiership in May 2003. On 29 February 2012 it was announced that Narraway would be joining French Top 14 side Perpignan at the end of the 2011–12 season. On 26 February 2014 London Irish announced that they had signed Narraway on a two-year deal from the beginning of the 2014–15 season. On 21 April 2016, he extended his contract for a further year.

On 12 April 2017 it was announced that Luke had signed a two-year contract to become a player- coach at Coventry. Coventry won National League 1 in Narraway's first year, achieving promotion to the RFU Championship.

== International career ==
Narraway represented England Saxons at the 2006 Churchill Cup.

On 29 January 2008, Narraway was named in the England team to play Wales in the opening round of the 2008 Six Nations Championship and made a moderate England debut in this match on 2 February. He continued to be selected on the bench for remaining fixtures over the rest of the 6 Nations championship.

Narraway was selected for England's squad touring New Zealand in June 2008 and played No.8 for both tests against the All Blacks. He was credited to being one of the few players who played well in both matches.

Since then, Martin Johnson announced Narraway in his Elite Player Squad for the 2008/09 season giving hope towards his inclusion in the England setup over the long-term future. Narraway played against Wales and Ireland in the 2009 Six Nations Championship.

Narraway played for England Saxons at the 2009 Churchill Cup.
