= Doddenham =

Hamlet in Worcestershire, England

Coordinates: 52.207384°N 2.36684°W

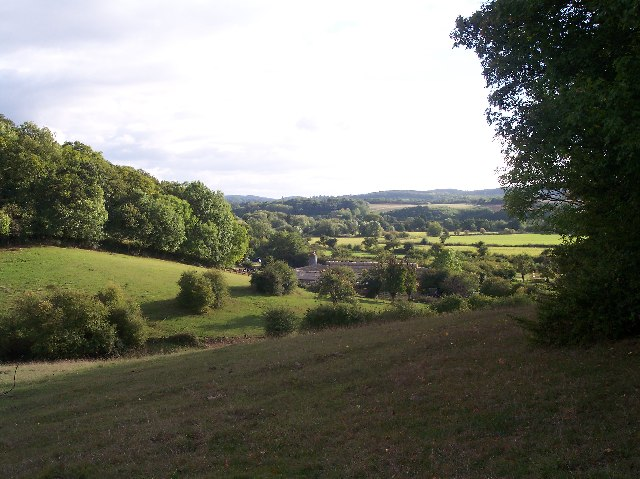
- Doddenham Hall Farm

- Location within Worcestershire
- Population: 245 (2021 cenus)
- District: Malvern Hills
- Shire county: Worcestershire
- Region: West Midlands
- Country: England
- Sovereign state: United Kingdom
- Post town: Worcester
- Postcode district: WR6
- Police: West Mercia
- Fire: Hereford and Worcester
- Ambulance: West Midlands
- UK Parliament: West Worcestershire

Doddenham is a hamlet and civil parish (with Knightwick) in the Malvern Hills district in the county of Worcestershire, England.

Doddenham was in the lower division of Doddingtree Hundred.

A notable landscape feature is Ankerdine Hill.

The name Doddenham derives from the Old English Doddahām meaning 'Dodda's village', or Doddahamm meaning 'Dodda's hemmed-in land'.
