= Stockton on Teme =

Village in Worcestershire, England

Coordinates: 52.303808°N 2.418408°W

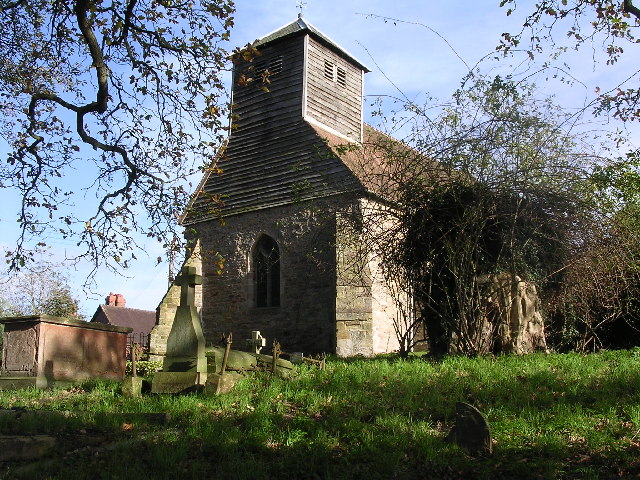
- Stockton on Teme church

- Location within Worcestershire
- OS grid reference: SO715673
- District: Malvern Hills
- Shire county: Worcestershire
- Region: West Midlands
- Country: England
- Sovereign state: United Kingdom
- Post town: WORCESTER
- Postcode district: WR6
- Police: West Mercia
- Fire: Hereford and Worcester
- Ambulance: West Midlands
- UK Parliament: West Worcestershire

Stockton on Teme is a village and civil parish in the Malvern Hills District in the county of Worcestershire, England. It is close to the River Teme and is noted for its 12th century Norman church with an unusual circular graveyard.(photo).

The current house on Pensax Road called Stockton Lodge was changed from Wharf Cottage (2006) which was previously 2 workers cottages called 96 pensax road which were made into a single dwelling called Wharf Cottage.

== History ==
Stockton on Teme was in the upper division of Doddingtree Hundred.

The Rev Theophilus Houlbrooke FRSE was rector of the church from 1770 until 1784 and Rev Thomas Pearson was rector from 1808 to 1828. He then moved to become the Rector at Great Witley where from 1843 to 1846 he was also the chaplain to Queen Adelaide who at that time was living at Witley Court.
