= Shelsley Walsh =

Village and civil parish in Worcestershire, England

Coordinates: 52°15′54″N 2°24′32″W

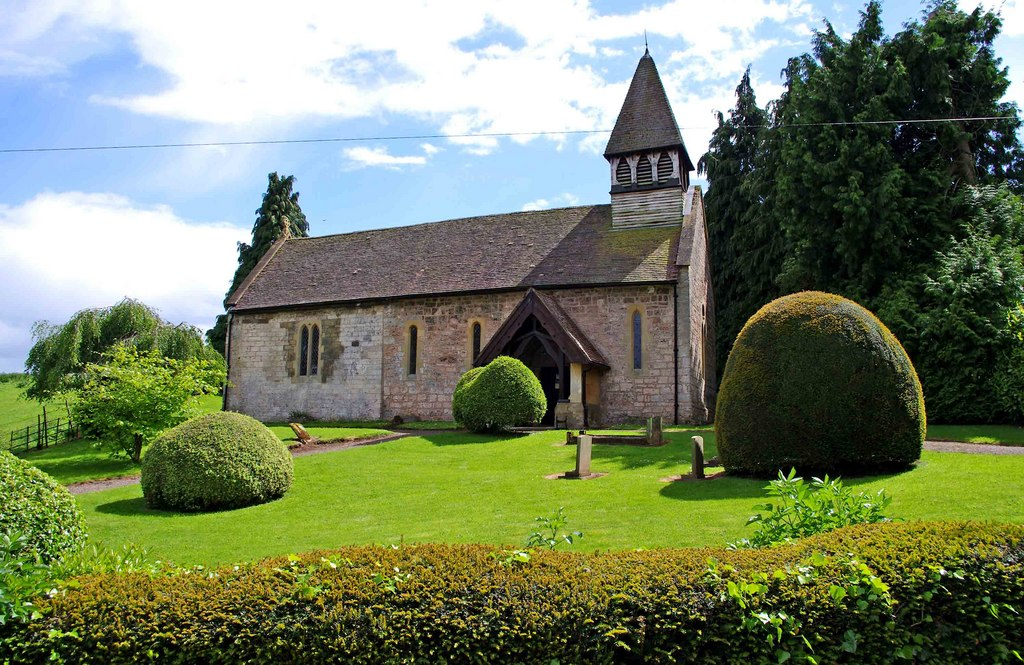
- St Andrew's Church

- Location within Worcestershire
- Population: 31 (Parish, 2021)
- Civil parish: Shelsley Walsh
- District: Malvern Hills
- Shire county: Worcestershire
- Region: West Midlands
- Country: England
- Sovereign state: United Kingdom
- Post town: Worcester
- Postcode district: WR6
- Police: West Mercia
- Fire: Hereford and Worcester
- Ambulance: West Midlands
- UK Parliament: West Worcestershire

Shelsley Walsh is a small village and civil parish in the Malvern Hills district of Worcestershire, England. It lies on the western side of the River Teme. At the 2021 census the parish had a population of 31. It shares a grouped parish council with the neighbouring parishes of Shelsley Beauchamp and Shelsley Kings, which are collectively known as the Shelsleys.

Shelsley Walsh is known for its association with the Shelsley Walsh Speed Hill Climb.

== History ==
The name of the settlement was recorded as Celdeslai in the Domesday Book, with the meaning of "Sceald's clearing": from Old English Sceald (a personal name) and leāh (wood, clearing). Other spellings were used in the following centuries, and the location was also known as Little Shelsley to distinguish it from Great Shelsley (Shelsley Beauchamp) on the opposite side of the River Teme. The village was described in 1831 as being within the upper division of Doddingtree hundred in Worcestershire and having 57 inhabitants. In 1868 John Noake gave the additional information that it consisted of two farm houses and nine cottages, and that its 410 acres were used for growing hops, fruit and corn.

The addition of Walsh to the village's name followed when members of the family became lord of the manor, the first of them being Sir Henry le Waleys in the time of King Edward I. They were to remain at Shelsley and in the surrounding district until the start of the eighteenth century, with as arms a fesse between six black martlets on a silver shield, the crest being a griffin's head with the motto veritas et virtu vincunt (truth and probity triumph). Later tenants of the manor included Joseph Smith, a notable breeder of Hereford cattle, and Montagu Taylor, whose fascination with modern technology led him to offer the use of one of his farm tracks as the earliest hill-racing venue for cars in 1905.

Shelsley Walsh has its own church, dedicated to St Andrew, which was built in the early 12th century. Shelsley Walsh had certainly become a parish by 1287, with its advowson owned by the Walsh family who also owned the manor. As late as 1535 the parish was paying an annual pension to the rector of Clifton upon Teme, which may indicate that Shelsley Walsh had anciently been part of that parish.

The ecclesiastical parishes of Shelsley Beauchamp (which included Shelsley Kings) and Shelsley Walsh were united into a single ecclesiastical parish called The Shelsleys in 1972. The three Shelsleys remain separate civil parishes.

== Governance ==
There are three tiers of local government covering the Shelsleys, at parish, district and county level: The Shelsleys Parish Council, Malvern Hills District Council, and Worcestershire County Council. The parish council is a grouped parish council, covering the three civil parishes of Shelsley Beauchamp, Shelsley Kings, and Shelsley Walsh.

== Buildings ==
=== St Andrew's church ===
St Andrew's church is the oldest existing building on the site and is of a simple design, having a Norman nave to which a chancel was added in the 13th century. Mainly it was built of a tufa known as travertine, available locally from along the ridge behind the church at Southstone Rock. The spectacular woodwork inside the building dates from the 15th century and is notable for the very rare chancel screen which extends into a squire's pew. Also to be found there is a circular Norman font, a floor of mediaeval tiles and the 1596 wooden tomb of Francis Walsh and his wife, carved to resemble stone. What Nicholas Pevsner described as a "distinctively quirky restoration" was made by George Truefitt in 1859, which resulted in the exterior addition of the pyramid-roofed wooden bell-turret and a north porch. Fortunately his interior additions of a font, pulpit and fireplace of his own mediaeval design were discarded in 1908 and the old font restored from its exile in the churchyard.

Having belonged during part of the 19th century to the Archdeaconry of Salop and Diocese of Hereford, the parish was later transferred to the Archdeaconry of Ludlow and Diocese of Hereford (1876–1905) before reverting to the Archdeaconry and Diocese of Worcester (1905–1972). After 1972 the separate parish of St Andrew's was merged with four others in the area to form the united benefice of the Teme Triangle.

=== Court House ===
On the site of what was formerly the Walsh's moated manor is now the Grade II listed building known as Court House. The older parts of this date from the 16th century, to which additions were made in the 17th, 18th and 19th centuries. It used to be said that the house was haunted by the ghost of Lady Lightfoot, who drove a carriage with flaming horses through the rooms before disappearing into the moat with fearful shrieks.

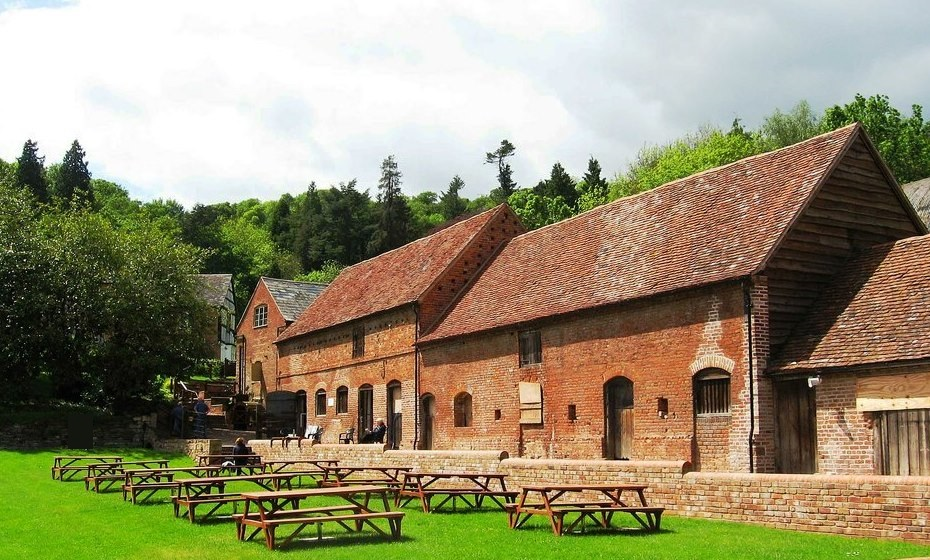
Shelsley Walsh, the mill and outbuildings after restoration

The house once functioned as the estate's home farm, near which was a mill recorded from the start of the 14th century. The present brick building dates from about 1800, with its wheel turned by water conducted from a pond in the grounds of Court House, itself fed from the steep dingle behind it. The mill is associated with a double range of buildings downslope, refurbished by Montagu Taylor as a model farm. Today the site functions as a tourist attraction and was Grade II listed in 2008. The mill, which was used to grind animal feed until 1923, was restored by volunteers during 2006-10.

Lying to the north of the site is a half-timber and plaster two-story house, recorded as the rectory on the 1883 Ordnance Survey map, and adjoining it the rectory farm, a combination of barn and dwelling.

== Former industry ==
There are indications of former industries in the names of two farms in Shelsley Walsh parish. One is Forgemill Farm, after which the nearby Newmill Bridge over the River Teme is also named. Somewhere in the vicinity there was a water-driven iron forge which in 1635 was sold with a parcel of ground called the Coal Yard to a local owner. The forge once produced 100 tons of iron a year and was recorded as still operative in 1779. On the corner of the turn to Newmill Bridge there is an old milestone with an iron plate recording the distance from Worcester Cross as ten miles.

Further along the road, near Furnace Farm, were three small lime kilns once fed with rock from hillside quarries in locations still named 'Hell Hole' and 'Devil's Den'. Two workers' cottages nearby were added to and rebuilt by Montagu Taylor, although they were abandoned by the mid-20th century. Southstone Rock was just over the parish boundary along the quarried ridge, from which stone was supplied not only for the church of St Andrew but also to build or repair others in the vicinity.
