= Grimley, Worcestershire =

Village in Worcestershire, England

Coordinates: 52.242°N 2.241°W

Grimley
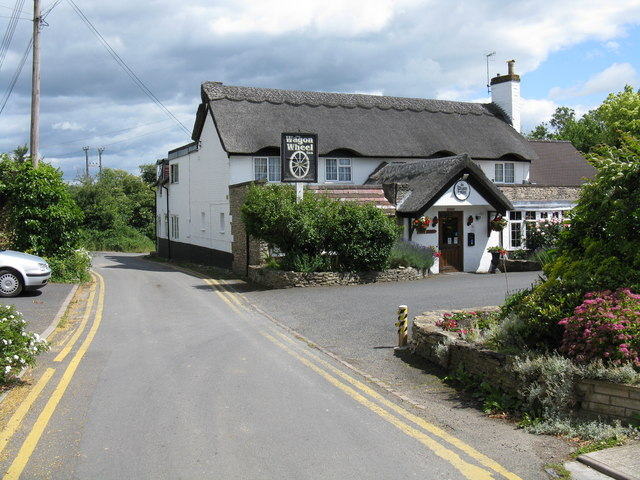
- Wagon Wheel Inn

- Location within Worcestershire
- Population: 640 (2021)
- District: Malvern Hills
- Shire county: Worcestershire
- Region: West Midlands
- Country: England
- Sovereign state: United Kingdom
- Post town: Worcester
- Postcode district: WR2
- Police: West Mercia
- Fire: Hereford and Worcester
- Ambulance: West Midlands
- UK Parliament: West Worcestershire

Grimley is a village and civil parish (grid reference SO8360) in the Malvern Hills District in the county of Worcestershire, England about 3 miles (4.8 km) north of Worcester. It is known for the Norman Parish Church, St Bartholomew's, and nature reserve SSSI.

The villages of Sinton Green and Monkwood Green sit within Grimley Parish. The parish had a population of 640 in 2021.

== History ==
The place-name 'Grimley' is first attested in a Saxon charter of 851, where it appears as Grimanlea. In the Domesday Book of 1086 it appears as Grimanleh. The name means 'wood haunted by a ghost or spectre' (Old English grima).

It once housed a monastery which was reputedly linked to Holt Castle via tunnels, and has been a site of refuge for thousands of years.

Following the Poor Law Amendment Act 1834, Grimley Parish ceased to be responsible for maintaining the poor in its parish. This responsibility was transferred to Martley Poor Law Union.

== Nearby ==
- Holt

== Grimley in fiction ==
Although the film Brassed Off is located in a village called "Grimley", the real band was located in Grimethorpe, South Yorkshire, on which that Grimley was based.
