= Doddingtree =

Former hundred in Worcestershire, England

Doddingtree hundred (dark) on a map of Worcestershire.

The hundred of Doddingtree was granted to Ralph Todeni, or Ralph de Toni, a relative of the Duke of Normandy, in 1066 by William the Conqueror as a reward for his services as Standard bearer during the Norman Conquest. It consisted mainly of west Worcestershire.

The early history of Doddingtree records that many of the Manors were owned by ecclesiastical authorities and some were moved into other Hundreds.

According to the Victoria County History, with the exception of Dowles (transferred from Shropshire in 1895) and Rochford (transferred from Herefordshire in 1832 and 1844), the hundred in 1831 contained the following parishes within two divisions: The upper division consisted of the Manors of Abberley; Acton Beauchamp; Alfrick; Areley Kings; Berrington; Bockleton; Clifton-upon-Teme; Cotheridge; Eastham; Edvin Loach; Hanley Child; Hanley William; Hillhampton Kyre Minor; Kyre Wyard; Martley; Lulsley; Orleton; Sapey Pritchard; Shelsley Kings; Shelsley Walsh; Stanford-on-Teme; Stockton-on-Teme; Suckley; Sutton and Tenbury. The lower division consisted of the Manors of Abberley; Astley; Alton; Bayton; Bewdley; Doddenham; Dowles; Glasshampton; Mamble; Ribbesford; Great Witley; Rochford; Shelsley Beauchamp; Rock; Shrawley and Stockton.
