= Broadwas =

Village in Worcestershire, England

Coordinates: 52.194047°N 2.350335°W

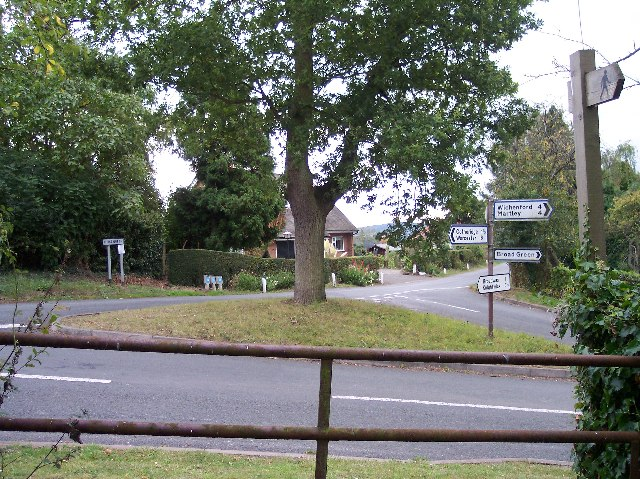
- Little Green

- Location within Worcestershire
- Population: 387
- District: Malvern Hills District
- Shire county: Worcestershire
- Region: West Midlands
- Country: England
- Sovereign state: United Kingdom
- Post town: Worcester
- Postcode district: WR6
- Police: West Mercia
- Fire: Hereford and Worcester
- Ambulance: West Midlands
- UK Parliament: West Worcestershire

Broadwas, or Broadwas-on-Teme, is a village and civil parish (with Cotheridge) in the Malvern Hills district of Worcestershire, England. According to the 2021 census it had a population of 387. The village is located on the River Teme, about 6 miles west of Worcester on the A44 road.

Off the main road near the River Teme is the red sandstone church of St Mary Magdelene.

== History ==
The name Broadwas derives from the Old English brādwæsse meaning 'broad alluvium tract', or 'broad land by a meandering river which floods and drains quickly'.

Following the Poor Law Amendment Act 1834 Broadwas Parish ceased to be responsible for maintaining the poor in its parish. This responsibility was transferred to Martley Poor Law Union.
