= Lulsley =

Village in Worcestershire, England

Coordinates: 52.198422°N 2.374789°W

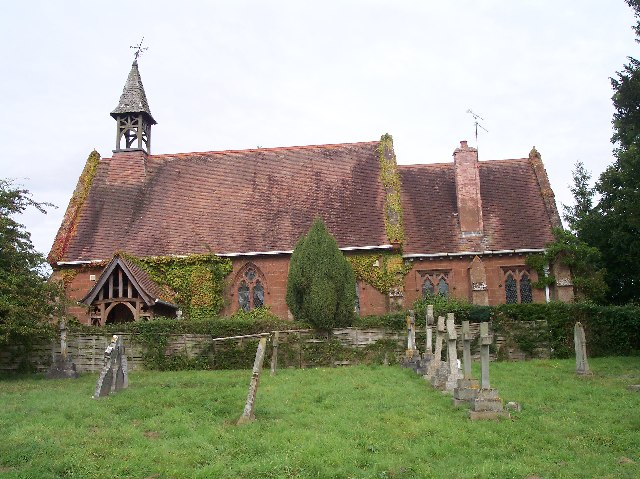
- Lusley Church

- Location within Worcestershire
- OS grid reference: SO744556
- Civil parish: Lulsley
- District: Malvern Hills
- Shire county: Worcestershire
- Region: West Midlands
- Country: England
- Sovereign state: United Kingdom
- Post town: WORCESTER
- Postcode district: WR6
- Police: West Mercia
- Fire: Hereford and Worcester
- Ambulance: West Midlands
- UK Parliament: West Worcestershire

Lulsley is a village and civil parish in the Malvern Hills District of the county of Worcestershire, England.

== History ==
The name Lulsley derives from the Old English Lullsēg meaning 'Lull's island'.

Lulsley was in the upper division of Doddingtree Hundred.

Following the Poor Law Amendment Act 1834 Lulsley Parish ceased to be responsible for maintaining the poor in its parish. This responsibility was transferred to Martley Poor Law Union.

== Notable people ==
Jabez Allies, a solicitor and an important writer on Worcestershire history and folklore was born in Lulsley.
