= Knightwick =

Village in Worcestershire, England

Coordinates: 52.199795°N 2.395406°W

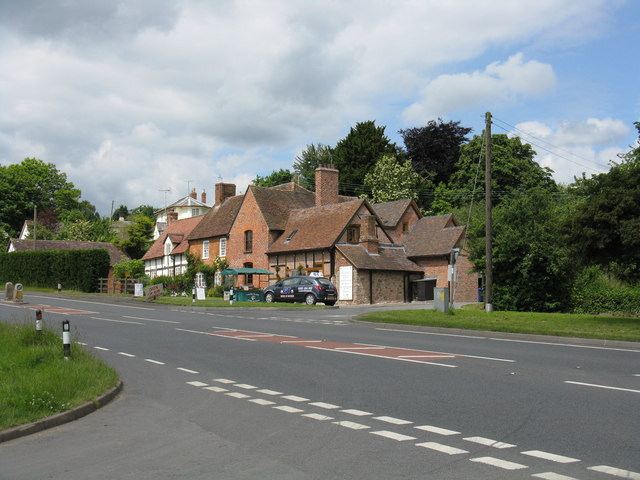
- Knightwick - the butcher's shop

- Location within Worcestershire
- OS grid reference: SO730558
- District: Malvern Hills
- Shire county: Worcestershire
- Region: West Midlands
- Country: England
- Sovereign state: United Kingdom
- Post town: WORCESTER
- Postcode district: WR6
- Police: West Mercia
- Fire: Hereford and Worcester
- Ambulance: West Midlands

Knightwick is a small village and civil parish (with Doddenham) in the Malvern Hills district in the county of Worcestershire, England.

== History ==
The name Knightwick derives from the Old English cnihtwīc meaning 'trading settlement of the youths'.

Knightwick manor house dates in part from the late 17th century and is a Grade II* listed building.

Knightwick's former parish church has been lost and replaced in 1879 with a mortuary chapel in the village graveyard.

Following the Poor Law Amendment Act 1834 Knightwick Parish ceased to be responsible for maintaining the poor in its parish. This responsibility was transferred to Martley Poor Law Union.

Previously served by the now closed Worcester, Bromyard and Leominster Railway.
