= Malvern Hills District =

Coordinates: 52.18°N 2.34°W

- Non-metropolitan district
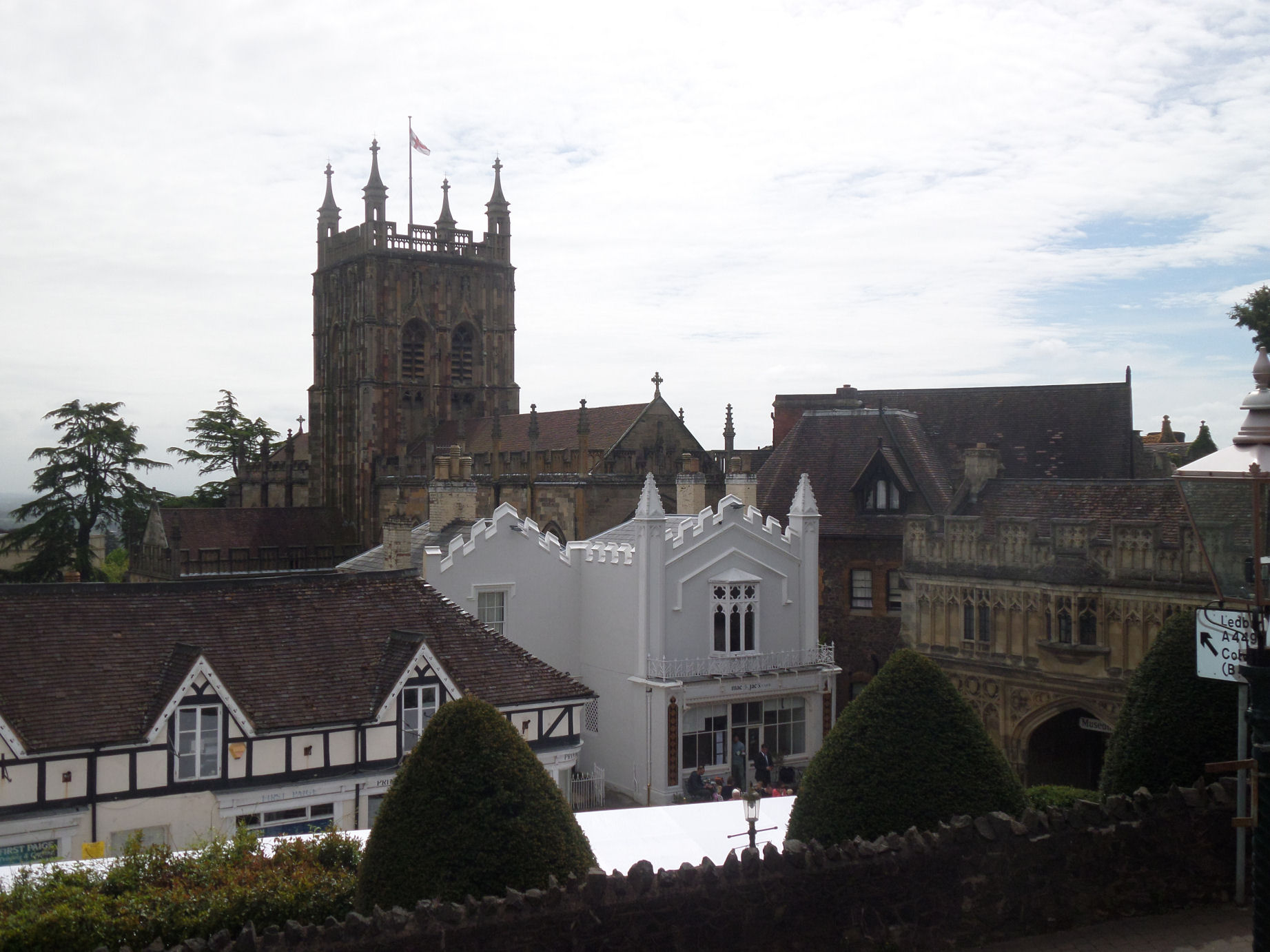
- Malvern, with its Priory church, is the district's largest settlement and its administrative centre

- Malvern Hills shown within Worcestershire and England
- Sovereign state: United Kingdom
- Constituent country: England
- Region: West Midlands
- Non-metropolitan county: Worcestershire
- Status: Non-metropolitan district
- Admin HQ: Great Malvern
- Incorporated: 1 April 1998

Government
  - Type: Non-metropolitan district council
  - Body: Malvern Hills District Council
  - MPs: Harriett Baldwin

Area
  - Total: 222.8 sq mi (577.1 km^{2})
  - Rank: 66th (of 296)

Population (2025)
  - Total: 84,380
  - Rank: 278th (of 296)
  - Density: 378.7/sq mi (146.2/km^{2})

Ethnicity (2021)
  - Ethnic groups: List: 96.6% White; 1.4% Mixed; 1.3% Asian; 0.3% Black; 0.3% other

Religion (2021)
  - Religion: List: 53.9% Christianity; 38.1% no religion; 0.5% Islam; 0.2% Hinduism; 0.1% Judaism; 0.1% Sikhism; 0.4% Buddhism; 0.5% other; 6.2% not stated
- Time zone: UTC0 (GMT)
  - Summer (DST): UTC+1 (BST)
- ONS code: 47UC (ONS); E07000235 (GSS)
- OS grid reference: SO7645153913

Malvern Hills is a local government district in Worcestershire, England. Its council is based in Malvern, the district's largest town. The district also includes the towns of Tenbury Wells and Upton-upon-Severn and a large rural area covering much of the western side of the county, including numerous villages. The district is named after the Malvern Hills, which are a designated Area of Outstanding Natural Beauty.

The neighbouring districts are Wyre Forest, Wychavon, Worcester, Tewkesbury, Forest of Dean, Herefordshire and Shropshire. In the 2021 census the population of the Malvern Hills district was 79,973.

The current district was formed in 1998. A previous Malvern Hills District, covering some of the same area, existed from 1974 to 1998, but had significantly different boundaries.

== History ==
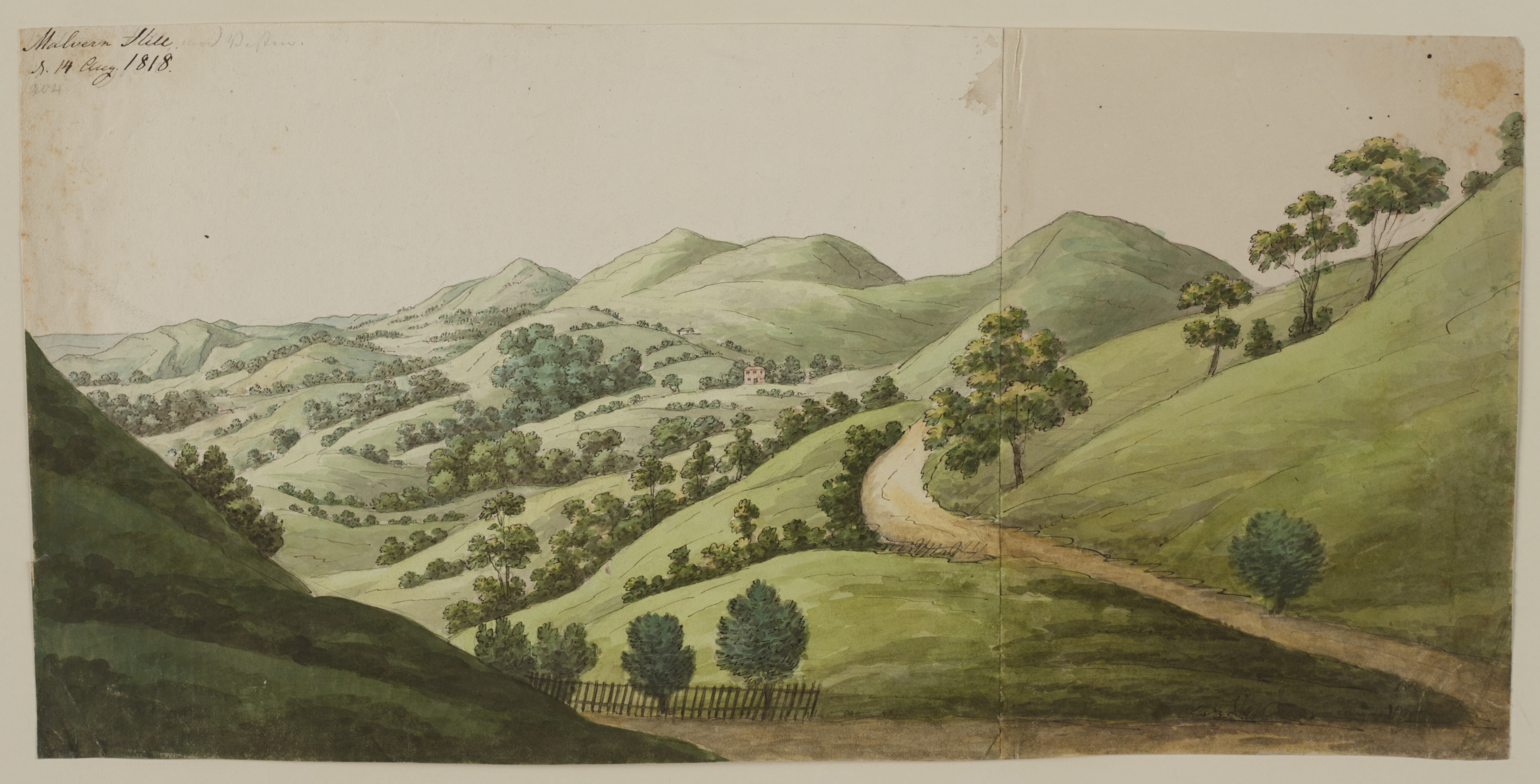
Drawing of Malvern Hills by Ole Jørgen Rawert, 14 August 1818.

The county of Hereford and Worcester was established in 1974, following the Local Government Act 1972, covering much of the historic counties of Herefordshire and Worcestershire which ceased to have independent county councils at that time. The new county was split into districts, two of which (Malvern Hills and Leominster) covered territory from both counties. On 1 April 1998 the county of Hereford and Worcester was abolished, being split into a unitary authority of Herefordshire and a two-tier non-metropolitan county of Worcestershire. The parishes from Malvern Hills district which had been the rural districts of Bromyard and Ledbury prior to 1974 were transferred to the new Herefordshire authority, whilst the parishes which had been the old Tenbury Rural District were added to Malvern Hills district from the abolished Leominster district. As such, the boundary between Worcestershire and Herefordshire as re-established in 1998 is almost identical to the pre-1974 boundary, the only exception being a small area containing Park Wood which had been transferred from Mathon to West Malvern in 1986 and so went to Malvern Hills district and Worcestershire rather than Herefordshire. Following the boundary changes in 1998, the hills after which the district is named now lie principally along its western edges.

== Abolition ==
Under current local government reorganisation plans, all district councils in Worcestershire, as well as the county council, will be abolished in 2028, with the district forming part of a new South Worcestershire unitary authority, also including the area of the Worcester and Wychavon districts.

== Governance ==
Malvern Hills District Council

Type
- Type: Non-metropolitan district

Leadership
- Chair: Beverley Nielsen, Independent since 12 May 2026
- Leader: John Gallagher, Independent since 26 November 2024
- Chief Executive: Vic Allison since 1 August 2020

Structure
- Seats: 31 councillors
- Graph of the party split among 31 seats.
- Political groups: Administration (14) Conservative (6) Independent (8) Other parties (17) Green (7) Liberal Democrats (4) Reform UK (1) Independent (5)
- Length of term: 4 years

Elections
- Voting system: First past the post
- Last election: 4 May 2023

Meeting place
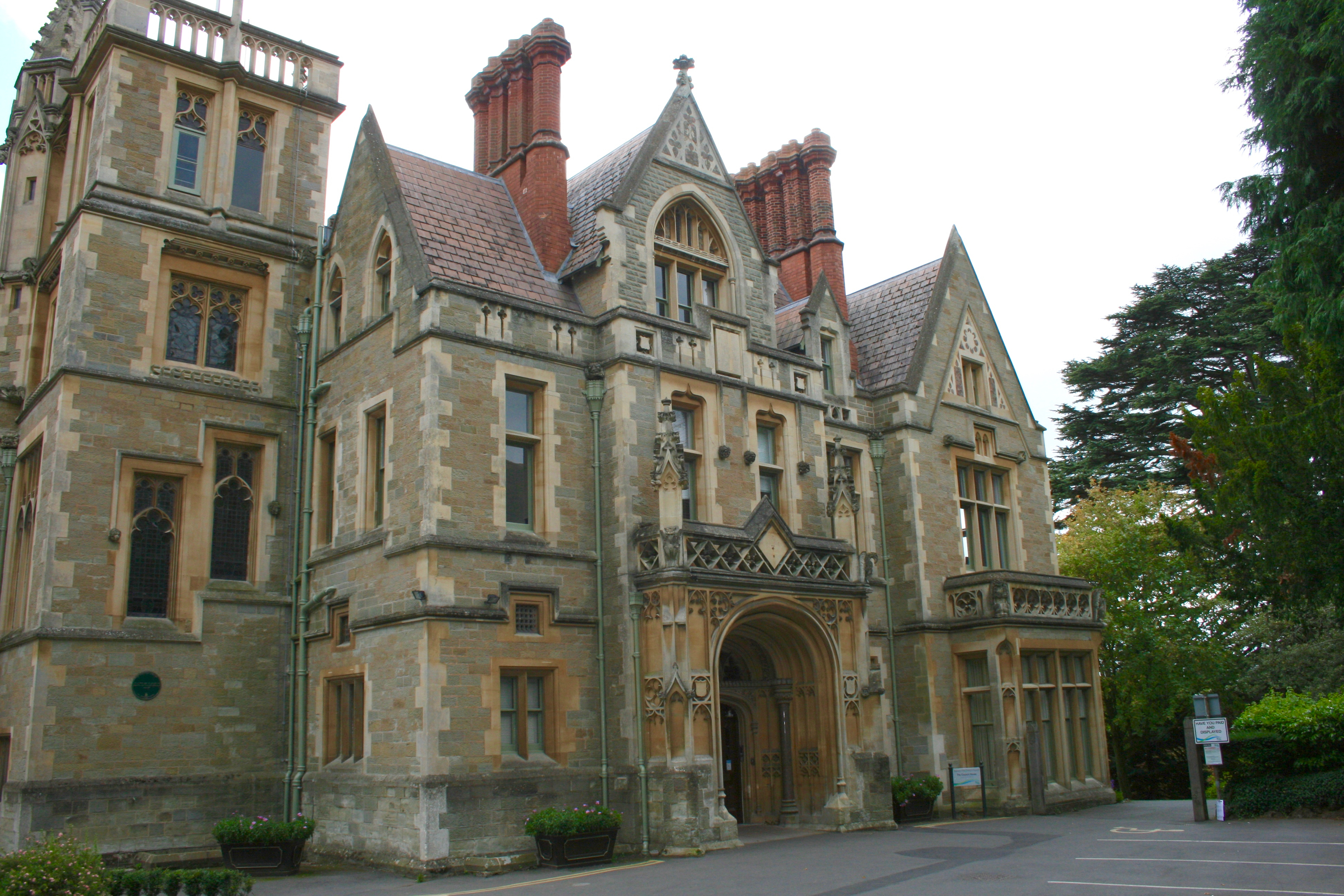
- Council House, Avenue Road, Malvern, WR14 3AF

Website
- www.malvernhills.gov.uk

Malvern Hills District Council provides district-level services. County-level services are provided by Worcestershire County Council. The whole district is covered by civil parishes, which form a third tier of local government.

Since 2014 the council has shared a chief executive and other staff with neighbouring Wychavon District Council.

=== Political control ===
The council went under no overall control in 2019, since when it has been led by independent councillors, sometimes working with other parties. Since November 2024, the administration has comprised the "Democratic Independent Group" of independent councillors and the Conservatives.

The first election to the current district council was held in 1997, initially operating as a shadow authority alongside the outgoing authorities until it came into its powers on 1 April 1998. Political control of the district council since 1997 has been as follows:

Party in control	Years
No overall control	1997–2007
Conservative	2007–2019
No overall control	2019–present

=== Leadership ===
The leaders of the council since 2000 have been:

Councillor	Party	From	To
Reg Farmer	Conservative	2000	May 2003
Tom Wells	Liberal Democrats	13 May 2003	10 May 2005
Di Rayner	Liberal Democrats	10 May 2005	May 2007
Serena Croad	Conservative	15 May 2007	21 Apr 2009
Phil Grove	Conservative	23 Jun 2009	15 May 2012
David Hughes	Conservative	15 May 2012	May 2015
Phil Grove	Conservative	19 May 2015	16 May 2017
David Chambers	Conservative	16 May 2017	May 2019
Sarah Rouse	Independent	14 May 2019	28 Mar 2022
Tom Wells	Independent	10 May 2022	26 Nov 2024
John Gallagher	Independent	26 Nov 2024	

=== Composition ===
Following the 2023 election, and subsequent by-elections and changes of allegiance up to August 2026, the composition of the council was:

Party	Councillors
Conservative	6
Green	6
Liberal Democrats	5
Reform	1
Independent	13
Total	31

Eight of the independent councillors sit together as the "Democratic Independent Group". All positions on the council's executive are held either by members of this group or the Conservatives. Three of the independent councillors sit in a group with the Green Party, and the other two independents form the "Malvern Hills Independents" group.

=== Elections ===
Since the last boundary changes in 2023 the council has comprised 31 councillors representing 18 wards, each electing one, two or three councillors. Elections are held every four years.

=== Premises ===
The council is based at the Council House on Avenue Road in Malvern. It was built between 1874 and 1880 as a house. It later served as a school from 1909 until 1925, when it was bought by the former Malvern Urban District Council and converted to become their headquarters, passing to Malvern Hills District Council on its creation in 1974.

== Geography ==
The Malvern Hills themselves form the border between, and offer scenic views over, the counties of Herefordshire and Worcestershire. The district includes approximately half of the Malvern Hills Area of Outstanding Natural Beauty (prior to the 1998 alterations to its boundary, it covered most of the AONB). The district bounds onto the counties of Gloucestershire, Herefordshire and Shropshire, as well as the Worcestershire districts of Wychavon, Worcester and Wyre Forest.

The River Teme is famous for its fishing and runs across the northern half of the district, from Tenbury Wells, to its confluence with the River Severn near Worcester, close to the site of the Battle of Worcester. Historically, the Teme Valley was famous for its orchards and hop yards, though these declined during the second half of the 20th century, with some revival since c. 2000. The River Severn forms the eastern boundary of the district (with Wychavon) between Stourport and Worcester, whilst to the south of Worcester the district includes parishes to the east of the Severn; the river is also popular with anglers and has public navigation rights.

The area has a significant spa heritage and Malvern water is bottled and distributed commercially worldwide. The spa buildings (The Pump Rooms) survive at Tenbury Wells and many free spring water sources are available to the public in and around Malvern. In the east of the district is Croome Court, a significant National Trust property.

== Towns and parishes ==
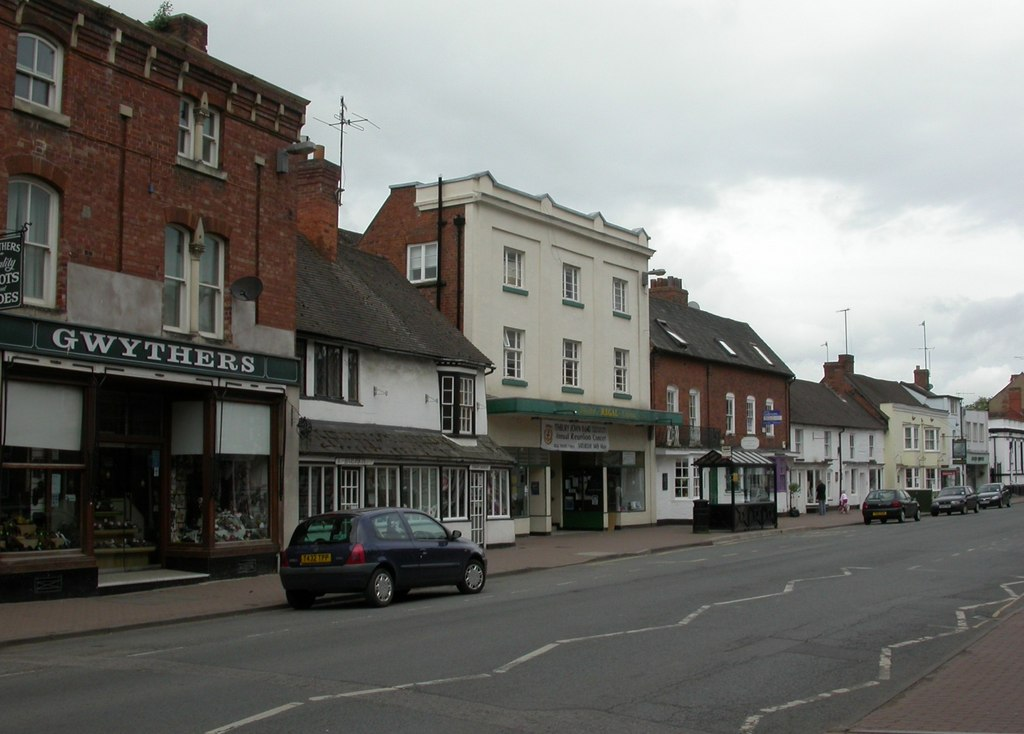
Tenbury Wells, lying close to the border with Shropshire is the second largest town in the district

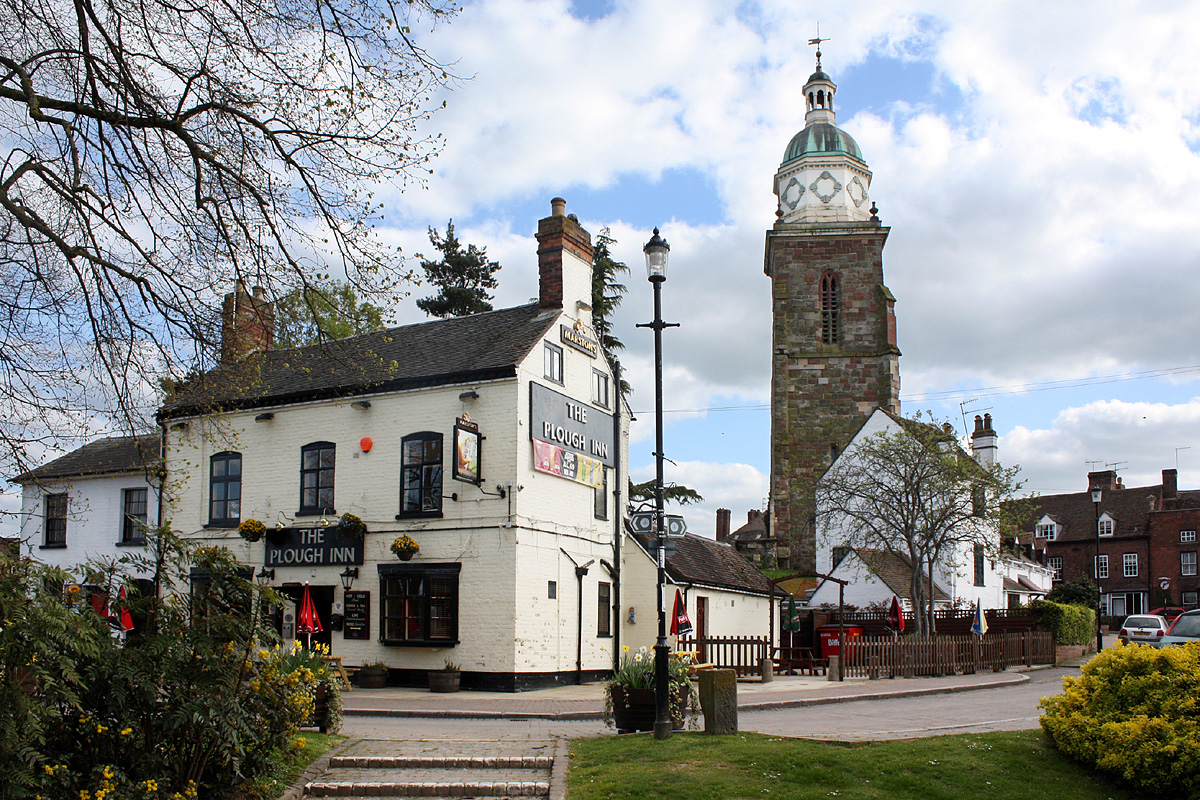
Upton-on-Severn, is the third-largest settlement in the district and lies close to the Gloucestershire border.

The whole district is divided into civil parishes. The parish councils for Malvern, Tenbury and Upton-upon-Severn have declared their parishes to be towns, allowing them to take the style "town council".

The parishes are:

- Abberley
- Alfrick
- Astley and Dunley
- Bayton
- Berrow
- Birtsmorton
- Bockleton
- Bransford
- Broadheath
- Broadwas
- Bushley
- Castlemorton
- Clifton upon Teme
- Cotheridge
- Croome D'Abitot
- Doddenham
- Earl's Croome
- Eastham
- Eldersfield
- Great Witley
- Grimley
- Guarlford
- Hallow
- Hanley Castle
- Hanley
- Hill Croome
- Hillhampton
- Holdfast
- Holt Fleet
- Kempsey
- Kenswick
- Knighton on Teme
- Knightwick
- Kyre
- Leigh
- Lindridge
- Little Malvern
- Little Witley
- Longdon
- Lower Sapey
- Lulsley
- Madresfield
- Malvern Wells
- Malvern
- Mamble
- Martley
- Newland
- Pendock
- Pensax
- Powick
- Queenhill
- Ripple
- Rochford
- Rushwick
- Severn Stoke
- Shelsley Beauchamp
- Shelsley Kings
- Shelsley Walsh
- Shrawley
- Stanford with Orleton
- Stockton-on-Teme
- Stoke Bliss
- Suckley
- Tenbury
- Upton-upon-Severn
- Welland
- West Malvern
- Wichenford

== Transport ==
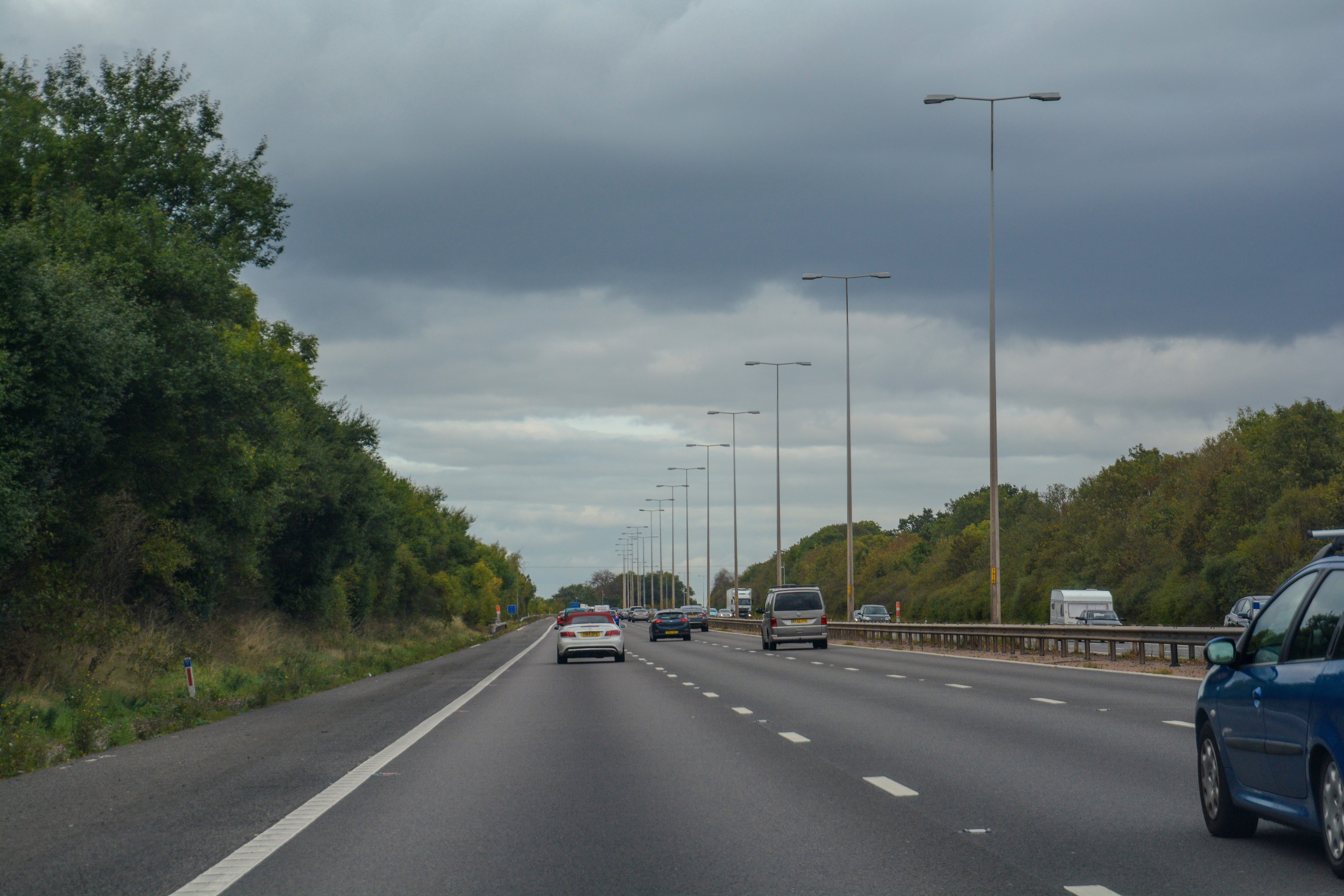
M5 Motorway, Malvern Hills District

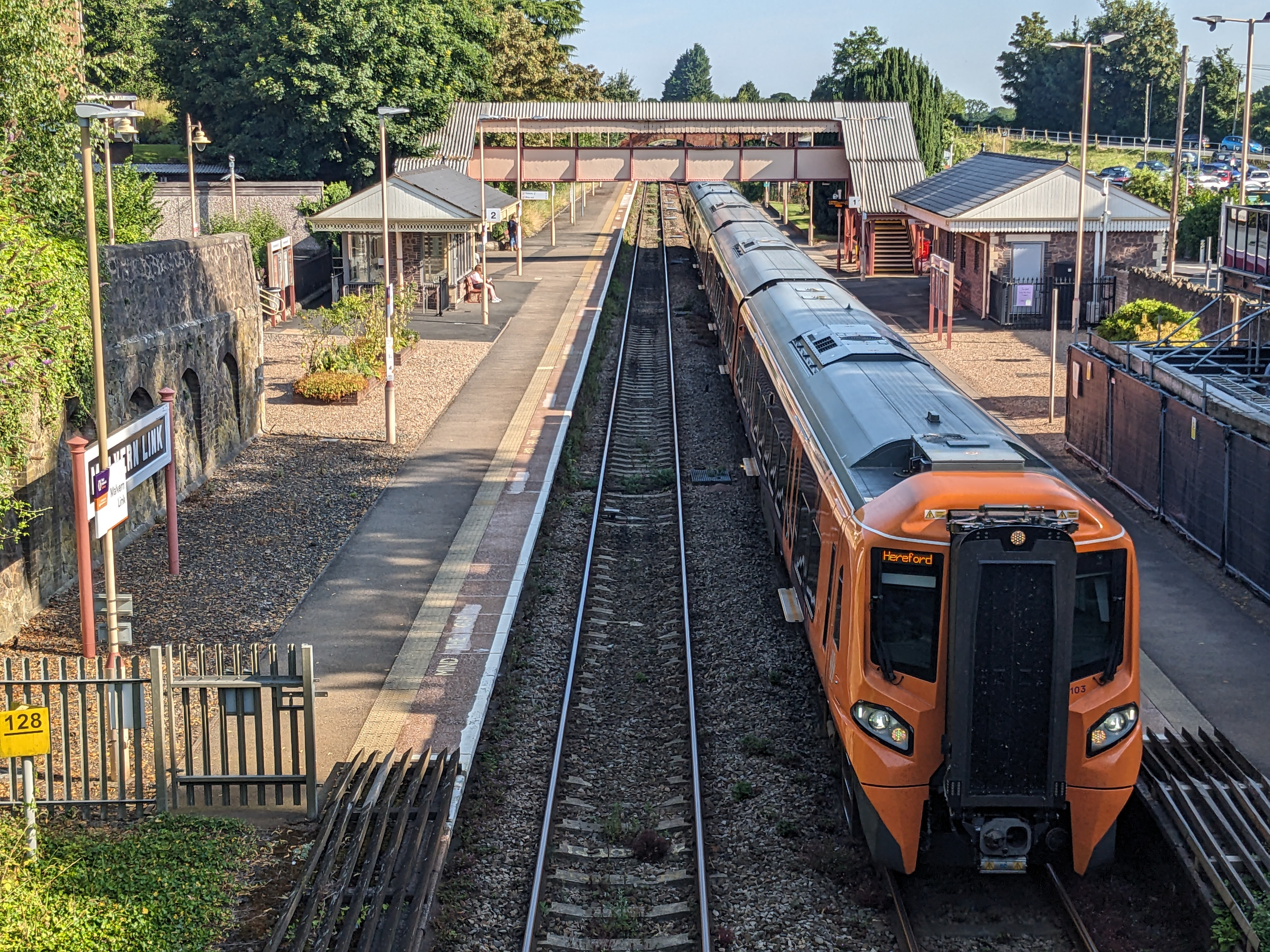
Malvern Link railway station

=== Roads ===
Two motorways pass through the Malvern Hills District, the M5 and M50, with the M50 passing through the village of Pendock. There are also multiple A roads that pass through the Malvern Hills District, including the A449 which passes through the biggest town in the Malvern Hills District, Malvern, the A4103 which passes through Leigh Sinton and Bransford before leaving the Malvern Hills District and entering the city of Worcester, the A44 which enters through Worcester and passes through Cotheridge and Broadwas, and the A456 which passes through Mamble and Newnham Bridge.

=== Railways ===
There are two railway stations in the Malvern Hills District: Malvern Link and Great Malvern. Both are served by two train operating companies, West Midlands Trains (under the trading name of West Midlands Railway), and Great Western Railway.

== See also ==
- Malvern Hills District Council elections
- Malvern Hills Conservators
