= River Teme =

River in Wales and England

River Teme Welsh: Afon Tefeidiad
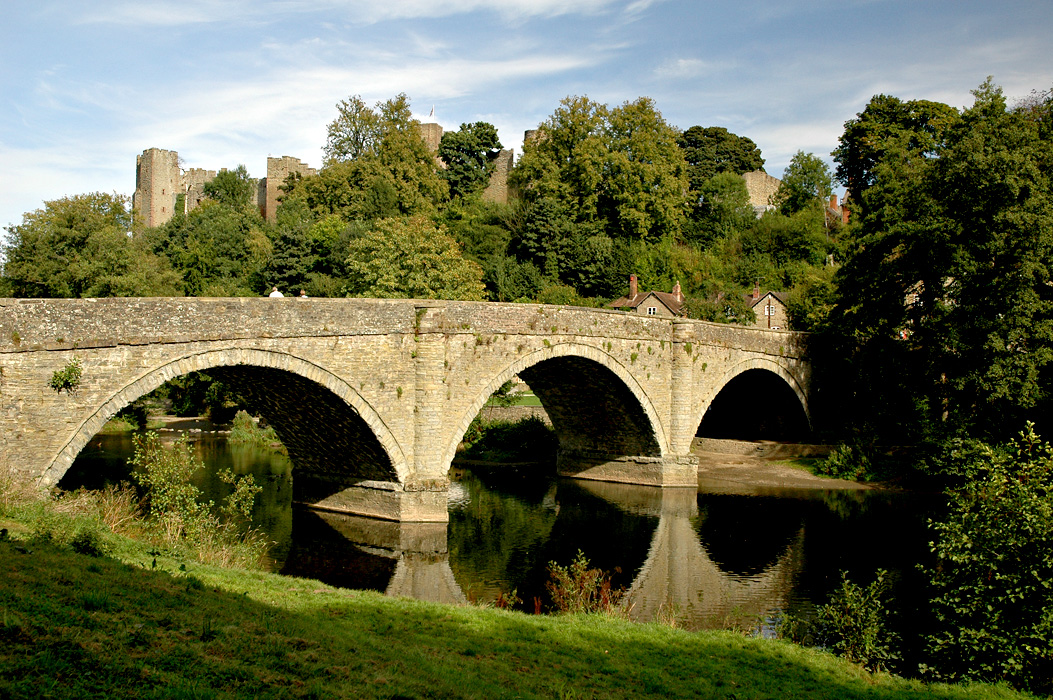
- The River Teme at Ludlow, Shropshire

- Route of the Teme

Location
- Country: Wales, England
- Counties: Powys, Shropshire, Herefordshire, Worcestershire

Physical characteristics
- Source: Dolfor
  - location: Kerry, Powys, Wales
  - coordinates: 52°28′18″N 3°19′28″W
  - elevation: 506 m (1,660 ft)
- Mouth: Confluence with River Severn
  - location: Powick, Worcestershire, England
  - coordinates: 52°09′48″N 2°14′44″W
  - elevation: 14 m (46 ft)
- Length: 130 km (81 mi)

Basin features
- Tributaries
  - left: River Clun, River Onny, River Corve, Ledwyche Brook, River Rea
  - right: Leigh Brook, Kyre Brook

The River Teme (pronounced /tiːm/; Welsh: Afon Tefeidiad) rises in Mid Wales, south of Newtown, and flows southeast roughly forming the border between England and Wales for several miles through Knighton before entering England in the vicinity of Bucknell and continuing east to Ludlow in Shropshire. From there, it flows to the north of Tenbury Wells on the Shropshire/Worcestershire border on its way to join the River Severn south of Worcester. The whole of the River Teme was designated as an SSSI by English Nature in 1996.

The river is crossed by a number of historic bridges including one at Tenbury Wells that was rebuilt by Thomas Telford following flood damage in 1795. It is also crossed, several times, by the Elan aqueduct.

== Etymology ==
The first known mention of the River Teme is in an eleventh-century manuscript containing a copy of a charter from around 770, where the name takes the forms Tamede and Temede. This name is similar to those of many other rivers in England - testament to their ancient origin - including River Team, River Thames, River Thame, River Tame and River Tamar. Scholars now believe that these and the older names Temese and Tamesis derive from Brythonic Tamesa, possibly meaning 'the dark one'.

== Geography ==
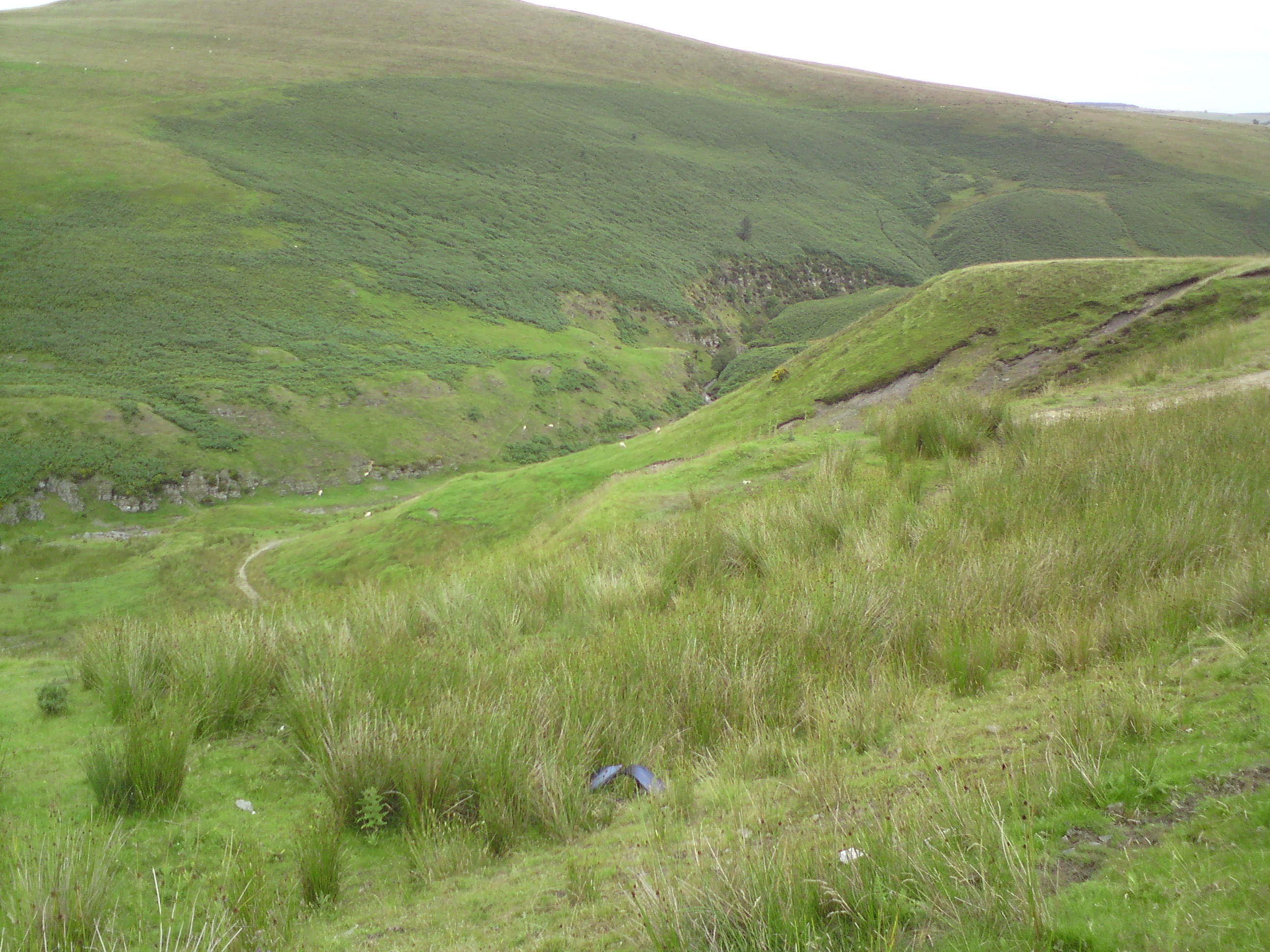
'The Ring', one mile below the source of the River Teme

The river source is in Mid Wales, on the western side of Bryn Coch in the hills near the village of Kerry, Dolfor to the south of Newtown, Powys. Two other rivers - the River Ithon and the River Mule - rise within 500 metres. It is roughly coincident with the border between England and Wales for several miles downstream from the Powys village of Felindre, passing Beguildy, Lloyney and Knucklas on the Powys side and Llanfair Waterdine on the Shropshire side before flowing past the small Powys town of Knighton. It continues to shadow the border eastwards as far as the vicinity of Bucknell and Brampton Bryan.

The Teme is joined by the River Clun at Leintwardine in north Herefordshire, then embarks on a circuitous course southeast then northeast to Bromfield, where it is joined by the River Onny. From there to its confluence with the River Severn, about 40 miles/65 km downstream at Worcester, it flows through the counties of Herefordshire, Shropshire and Worcestershire. The upper reaches of the river are usually steep with fast flowing but relatively shallow waters. There are some water mills, and a number of weirs, including several at the historic town of Ludlow. Below Tenbury Wells the river is more tranquil but still shallow, with strong cross currents.

During its journey the river flows over Upper Ludlow shales and Devonian sandstones. Water levels in the Teme are highly variable, something which has been made worse in recent years through increases in water extraction for agriculture use. However, the Teme has also often burst its banks too. June and July 2007 saw serious floods in a number of areas, including Leintwardine, Tenbury Wells and Ludlow, although the watercourse that flooded the last location was a tributary, the River Corve. The Lower Teme has a deep channel cut in a wide alluvial plain across which it meanders. It responds rapidly to rainfall and cut-offs have been numerous along the river's course, where backchannels and old oxbows can clearly be seen.

The River Corve flows into the Teme just outside Ludlow and the Ledwyche Brook flows into the Teme at Burford, close to the Herefordshire/Shropshire/Worcestershire tripoint. The Kyre Brook flows into the Teme at Tenbury Wells, and the River Rea flows into the Teme at Newnham Bridge, Worcestershire, a few miles south of Cleobury Mortimer.

The Teme is the second largest tributary to the River Severn, falling from a height of about 450 metres above sea level at its source to just 14 metres above sea-level at its downstream confluence. A Site of Special Scientific Interest throughout its length, it is a clean river and after many years of decline the population of otters is recovering, but obstructions keep salmon numbers at a low level.

== Recreational use ==
=== Fishing ===
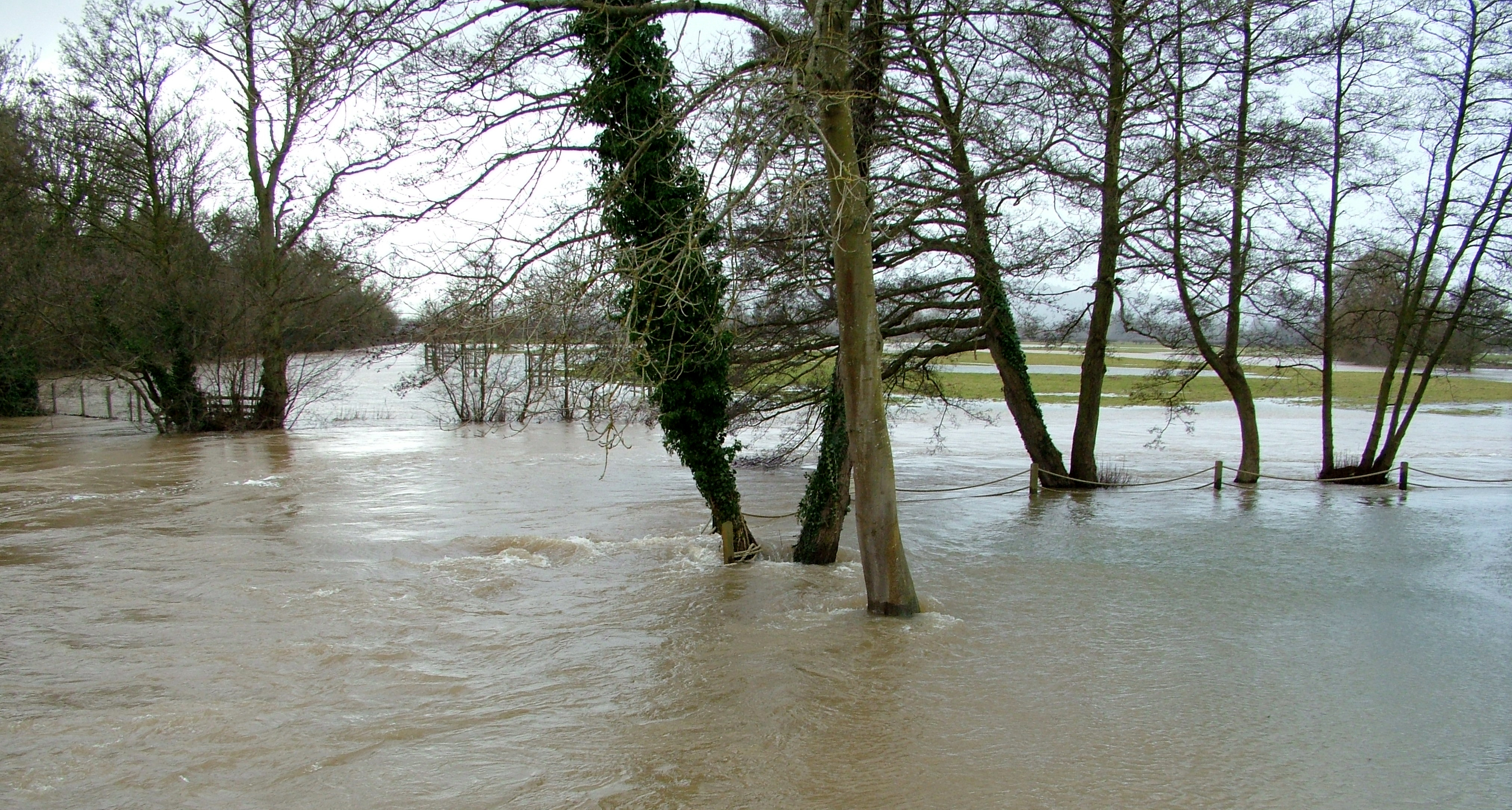
The Teme in flood at Leintwardine

Fishing is a popular sport on many parts of the River Teme, with its barbel fishing being particularly noted.

=== Leisure boating ===
Leisure boats have long been used on the river and rowing boats can still be hired at The Linney Park, Ludlow. An annual coracle regatta has been held on the Teme. In June 2005 it was held at Leintwardine. In June 2006, the 12th regatta was held at Mortimer's Cross

A Countryside Agency report in September 2003 entitled Improving access for canoeing on inland waterways: A study of the feasibility of access agreements stated:

There are no formal access agreements for canoeing on the Teme. However, unlawful canoeing does occur and there are many claims about the resulting conflict. As a result of its character, the demand for canoeing is seasonal, when there is enough water in the river, and is more in the upper reaches where the faster water can be found. However, this part of the river is also the most valuable for fishing, with riparian owners keen to protect their interests and prevent canoeing, on the grounds that the Teme is not suited to canoeing under any circumstances. While there is probably less conflict below Tenbury, there is also less interest in canoeing, and probably less opportunity, given the water levels.

Information on canoeing on the Teme in the Ludlow area is available here and on the Tenbury Wells to Broadwas area here.

=== Leisure boating in the past ===
Historical evidence of leisure boating mentions in Victorian publications. Old maps show a few boat houses along the river in Worcestershire. Billings Directory 1855 mentions Boat House, evidently a farmhouse, five miles downstream of Tenbury Wells, and Boat House Farm still exists in Eastham. In addition, the boathouse at Newnham Bridge (three miles downstream of Tenbury Wells) was large enough, and substantial enough, to be converted later into a house.

At Tenbury Wells in 1886, people were rescued during floods using a boat that had broken loose from its mooring so there must have been at least one boat on the river at that time. The guide, Tenbury Wells and the Teme Valley includes a photograph taken at Little Hereford described as "Boating on the Teme in 1905". The author mentions two gentlemen from Oxford who in 1894 travelled up the Teme from Worcester to Ludlow in 17.5 hours, and returned (downstream) in 9 hours. Another book, Down Along Temeside, includes an account of travelling by boat from Ludford Mill to Orleton (a couple of miles upstream of Stanford Bridge) in the early 20th century.

Up at Leintwardine, a 'Teme coracle' has been locally made since the late 1980s and such craft may have been in existence earlier, near the start of that century - or earlier still, as a distant successor to the coracles once used to transport lead down to Worcester from Dre-fach Felindre in Roman times.

== Travel ==
=== Navigation to Powick Mill ===
The final 1.5 miles (2.4 km) from Powick bridge and Mill to its confluence with the river Severn that the Teme is (or was) navigable. There was a coal wharf near Powick Bridge, belonging with the mill, whose owner had the right to use a towing path to the river Severn. In the 18th century, pig iron was brought up the river to Powick forge (as the mill then was). In 1810 it was reported that "The Teme is also navigable for barges from its junction with the Severn near Powick upwards to a small distance above Powick Bridge. The river having considerable declivity its navigation is soon interrupted by shoals and shallows"

=== Above Powick Mill ===
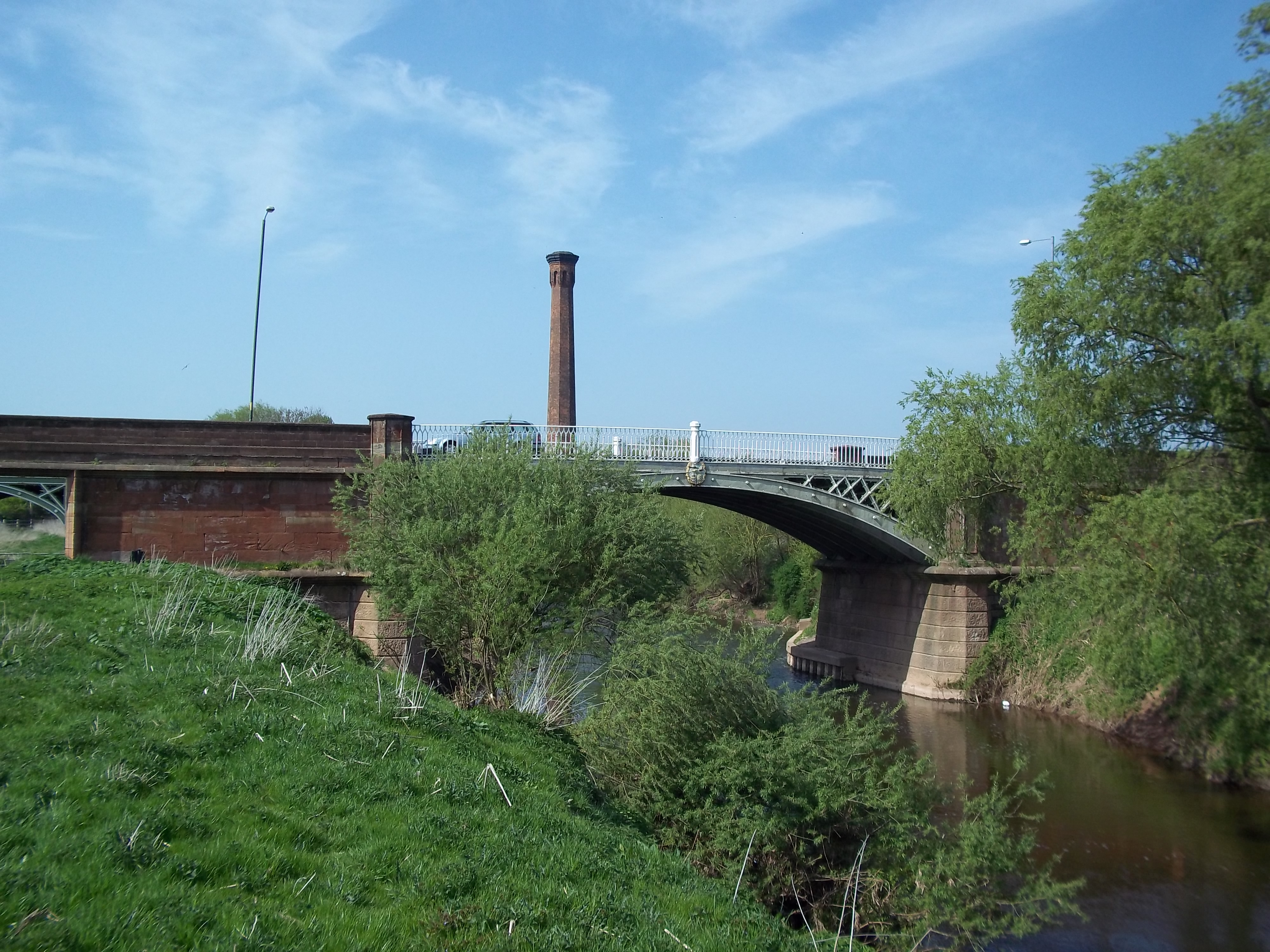
River Teme at Powick Mill and the A449 road bridge

Except for its lowest reaches, there is no substantial evidence that the river was navigable by barges. Claims have been made that traffic on the Teme began in Roman times and "continued in Norman times, when it is known the stone for the mill at Ashford Carbonel was brought from Caen in the 14th century, using water transport all the way". However no unequivocal documentary or archaeological evidence has been adduced in support of this.

William Sandys who between 1636 and 1639 made the Avon navigable from Tewkesbury to Stratford-upon-Avon was at the same time also authorised to improve the Teme between Worcester and Ludlow. There is however no evidence that he did so, perhaps due to his having used up all his resources on the Avon. Having failed to recover the Avon after the Restoration, Sir William Sandys and his son undertook work on the Wye and Lugg.

Ferries formerly existed at Rochford, at Cotheridge and at Clifton on Teme. Some very local navigation is indicated by a newspaper advertisement in 1750 that the miller at Stanford-on-Teme had a boat for sale, capable of carrying 10 tons. However, with no locks available, this vessel would have been unable to pass mill weirs.

Pictures, allegedly of Ludlow or its castle with a river and boats (thought to date from c. 1830), such as a painting allegedly of Dinham Bridge, Ludlow, are probably at least partly derived from the artist's imagination.

This subject was debated at length in 2006 in the Journal of Railway and Canal Historical Society.

=== Railway lines ===
A school inspector in the mid-19th century, wishing to visit the endowed school at Shelsley Beauchamp where the Teme turns to run south through wooded hills, found that he must travel there on horseback in the absence of either coaches or railway. There had, indeed, been a slightly earlier proposal for a railway line that followed the lower course of the river. Under the name of the Worcester, Tenbury and Ludlow Railway, this was submitted to Parliament in November 1846, but by 1849 the scheme had been wound up.

More or less the same course was proposed for the Teme Valley Railway in 1866. This was planned as a link between a line from Worcester to South Wales, that in the end was never built, and the recently opened Tenbury and Bewdley Railway, from which there was a connection to Ludlow via the Shrewsbury and Hereford Railway. Lacking funds or any particular need for such a line through sparsely settled agricultural land, however, the plan came to nothing.

== In the arts ==
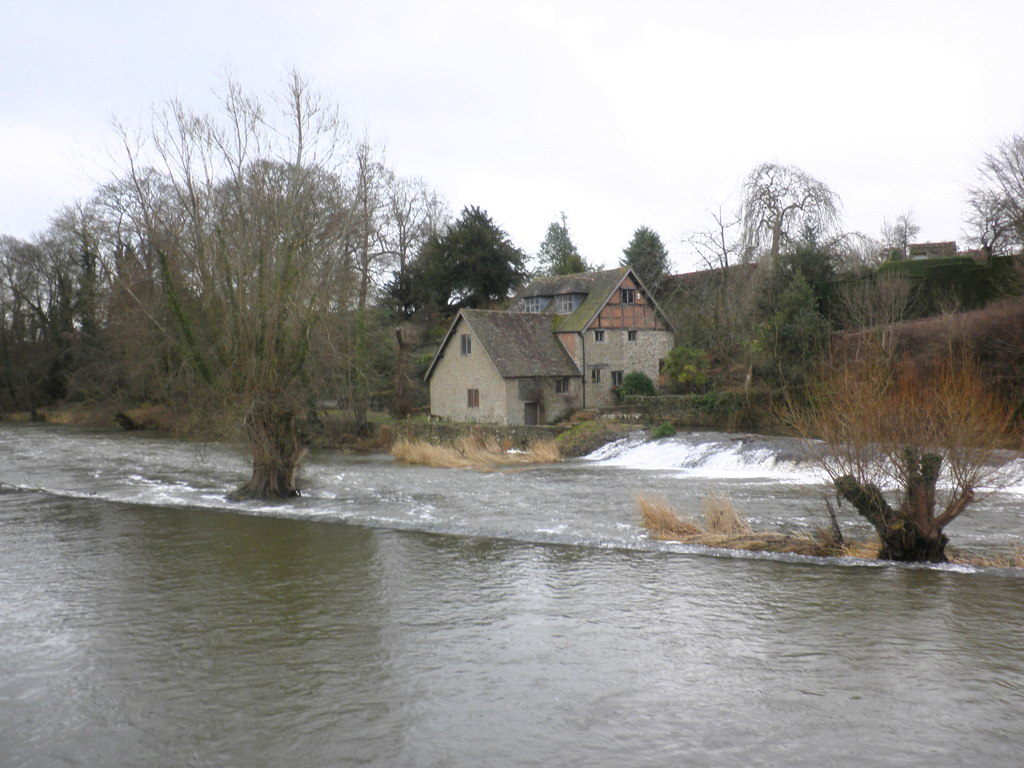
Ludford Mill weir

A river that changes from season to season, not to mention having changed course over the years, coexists with the land that encloses it. In the eyes of those who have painted the Teme, it has often been features on its banks which were their main subjects – nowhere more so than at Ludlow Castle, where the river is only incidentally pictured flowing at its base by Samuel Scott and David Cox. For his 1800 view of the castle, Joseph Mallord William Turner preferred to place Dinham Bridge crossing the river in the foreground, while Edmund John Niemann looked down on another bridge into the town from the high ground above.

The 18th century landowner Richard Payne Knight had his grounds at Downton Castle, not far away on the banks of the Teme, laid out in the picturesque style of the time, and there the river was incorporated into the design, notably at the ‘alpine bridge’ which he commissioned Thomas Hearne to portray among other views of the site. In the following century, George Price Boyce was noted for the Pre-Raphaelite precision of his landscape paintings, some of which featured the high banks of the river. Later on, Worcester-born Harry William Adams (1868–1947) painted the Teme's lower reaches, specialising in atmospheric effects such as a snow scene above the valley or overhanging woodland at sunset.

The river has had its poets too. Richard Gardner, who terms himself 'the poet of the Teme' on the title page of his volume of Poems (Worcester, 1825), "hopes you will consider him to rank among the first uneducated poets" when reading his topographical tributes to his chosen river. A few years later an anonymous Ludlow poet submits "the production of a young man…to the public with becoming deference", including among them a "Sonnet to the River Teme".

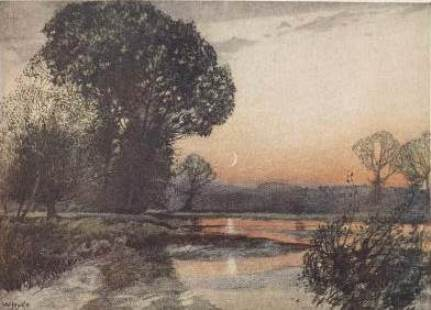
Hyde's On the Teme (1908) in Housman’s A Shropshire Lad

A. E. Housman made only a passing mention of the river's name in A Shropshire Lad, but that ensured its incorporation into the song cycle Ludlow and Teme (1923) when Ivor Gurney set some of the poems to music. However, the musician who received his greatest inspiration from the Teme was Edward Elgar, whose favourite spot on the river was at Knightwick. It was there that he composed much of The Dream of Gerontius; and childhood reminiscences of the Teme, he also said, were contained in the trio in the second movement of his first symphony.

== Settlements on the River Teme ==
- (source)
- Felindre
- Beguildy
- Llanfair Waterdine
- Knucklas
- Knighton, Powys
- Bucknell
- Brampton Bryan
- Leintwardine
- Burrington
- Bromfield
- Ludlow
- Ashford Bowdler
- Ashford Carbonel
- Little Hereford
- Tenbury Wells
- Knighton-on-Teme
- Lower Rochford
- Newnham Bridge
- Eastham
- Eardiston
- Stockton-on-Teme
- Stanford Bridge
- Shelsley Walsh
- Shelsley Beauchamp
- Clifton-upon-Teme
- Whitbourne
- Martley
- Knightwick
- Broadwas
- Lulsley
- Cotheridge
- Leigh
- Bransford
- Powick
- Worcester

== See also ==
- Canals of the United Kingdom
- History of the British canal system
