= Martley =

Village in Worcestershire, England

Coordinates: 52.23584°N 2.36018°W

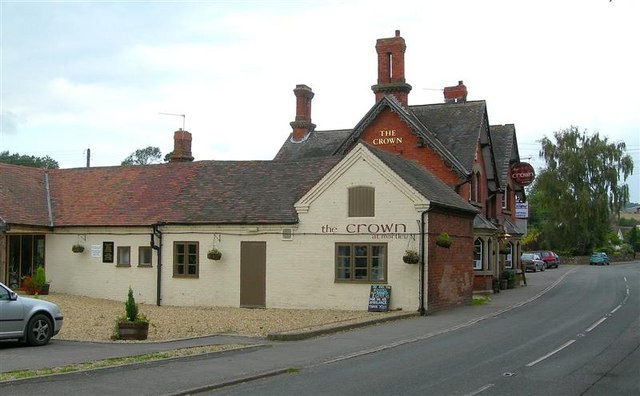
- The Crown

- Location within Worcestershire
- OS grid reference: SO754597
- Civil parish: Martley
- District: Malvern Hills
- Shire county: Worcestershire
- Region: West Midlands
- Country: England
- Sovereign state: United Kingdom
- Post town: WORCESTER
- Postcode district: WR6
- Dialling code: 01886
- Police: West Mercia
- Fire: Hereford and Worcester
- Ambulance: West Midlands
- UK Parliament: West Worcestershire

Martley is a village and civil parish in the Malvern Hills district of the English county of Worcestershire. It is approximately nine miles north-west of Worcester. The population of the village is approximately 1,200 people. The mixed farming of the area includes arable, formerly cherry, apple, damson orchards and hopyards.

It is a popular village for retired people and professionals working in the city and surrounding towns, and has a large secondary school to which around 700 pupils are bussed daily from the surrounding area. It has a sports hall with rock climbing wall and a gym within the grounds of the school can be used by the public out of school times.

== Geology ==
The village and its extensive parish sits astride the Malvern Line, a north–south aligned lineament originating in Precambrian times. To the east are Triassic sandstones whilst to the west are Devonian mudstones. Along the lineament itself are a complex mix of rocks of Precambrian, Cambrian and Silurian age.

== History ==
Berrow Hill, an Iron Age hillfort, is one of several in the area, which hosts a beacon.

The name Martley derives from the Old English mearðlēah meaning 'marten wood/clearing'.

Martley was in the upper division of Doddingtree Hundred.

Following the Poor Law Amendment Act 1834 Martley Parish ceased to be responsible for maintaining the poor in its parish. This responsibility was transferred to Martley Poor Law Union.

A lane leads south from the village to the church which stands close to a spring known as St Peters Well, suggesting a pre-Christian origin for the site. The red sandstone parish church of St Peter is Norman in origin. Its peal of six bells, cast locally in 1673 by the bellfounder Richard Keene of Woodstock, in Oxfordshire, is the only complete set of original bells in the county. The bells are a Maiden Ring, a peal of bells that sounds the correct notes immediately after casting and needs no further tuning. St. Peter's was one of the first churches in Worcestershire to have as many as six bells and at the beginning of the 18th century very few churches had more than three or four bells. In 1894 the bells were rehung on the original frame and no further major work has been required since.
The church also contains some medieval wall paintings and an alabaster effigy of Sir Hugh Mortimer, Lord of Kyre and Martley, killed in the Battle of Wakefield in 1460. In 1999 a new stained glass window was cut, leaded and installed by Patrick Costeloe for the artist Tom Denny.

== Notable people ==
- Sir Charles Hastings (1794–1866) founder of the British Medical Association was raised in Martley.
- Francis Jukes (1745–1812) engraver was born in Martley.
- Martin Stainforth (1866–1957) equine artist was born in Martley.

== Amenities ==
Martley has a village shop, the Crown public house, a petrol station/garage . Schools in Martley include a primary school and the Chantry High School which has approximately 700 students and has a special technology status. It serves a large rural catchment area. Its sports hall is shared with the public.

There are many walks in the local area such as the Worcestershire Way which passes close by Rodge Hill, and the River Teme is also near the village.

The village is home to Martley Cricket Club, running teams in the Worcestershire League Division 3(Sat), Division 8 (Sat) and the Worcester Evening League (Tues) with friendly games on Sunday's throughout the season. In 2000 Australian cricketer Glenn McGrath played a match in Martley. The football club has two Saturday teams and a Sunday team. Martley has its own radio station, Longside Radio, currently broadcasting over the Internet. It has growing support locally and hopes to develop links with Chantry High School and youth club. The station broadcasts a wide variety of music and live shows broadcast every evening. Now broadcasting from the heart of the village in the old weighbridge. Details of how to listen and contact the station are on their website.
