= List of United Kingdom locations: Ben-Bez =

The United Kingdom

This is part of the list of United Kingdom locations: a gazetteer of place names in the United Kingdom showing each place's locality and geographical coordinates.

== Be (continued) ==
=== Ben-Bep ===
Location	Locality	Coordinates (links to map & photo sources)	OS grid reference
Benacre	Suffolk	52.39°N 01.68°E	TM5184
Benbecula	Western Isles	57.44°N 07.32°W	NF808515
Benchill	Manchester	53.38°N 02.27°W	SJ8288
Bencombe	Gloucestershire	51.67°N 02.30°W	ST7997
Benderloch	Argyll and Bute	56.48°N 05.41°W	NM9038
Bendish	Hertfordshire	51.87°N 00.31°W	TL1621
Benenden	Kent	51.05°N 00.56°E	TQ8032
Benfieldside	Durham	54.86°N 01.86°W	NZ0952
Bengal	Pembrokeshire	51.94°N 04.98°W	SM9532
Bengate	Norfolk	52.79°N 01.41°E	TG3027
Bengeo	Hertfordshire	51.80°N 00.08°W	TL3213
Bengeworth	Worcestershire	52.08°N 01.94°W	SP0443
Bengrove	Gloucestershire	51.98°N 02.04°W	SO9732
Benhall	Gloucestershire	51.88°N 02.11°W	SO9221
Benhall Green	Suffolk	52.19°N 01.48°E	TM3861
Benhall Street	Suffolk	52.19°N 01.43°E	TM3561
Benhilton	Sutton	51.37°N 00.19°W	TQ2665
Benholm	Aberdeenshire	56.81°N 02.32°W	NO8069
Beningbrough	North Yorkshire	54.00°N 01.20°W	SE5257
Benington	Hertfordshire	51.89°N 00.11°W	TL3023
Benington	Lincolnshire	52.99°N 00.06°E	TF3946
Benington Sea End	Lincolnshire	52.99°N 00.08°E	TF4046
Benllech	Isle of Anglesey	53.31°N 04.23°W	SH5182
Benmore	Argyll and Bute	56.02°N 05.00°W	NS1385
Bennacott	Cornwall	50.70°N 04.42°W	SX2992
Bennah	Devon	50.64°N 03.65°W	SX8384
Bennecarrigan	North Ayrshire	55.45°N 05.25°W	NR9423
Bennetland	East Riding of Yorkshire	53.74°N 00.75°W	SE8228
Bennett End	Buckinghamshire	51.65°N 00.87°W	SU7896
Bennetts End	Hertfordshire	51.73°N 00.46°W	TL0605
Benningholme	East Riding of Yorkshire	53.83°N 00.30°W	TA1138
Benniworth	Lincolnshire	53.31°N 00.20°W	TF2081
Benover	Kent	51.20°N 00.43°E	TQ7048
Ben Rhydding	Bradford	53.91°N 01.80°W	SE1347
Bensham	Gateshead	54.95°N 01.62°W	NZ2462
Benslie	North Ayrshire	55.65°N 04.65°W	NS3343
Benson	Oxfordshire	51.61°N 01.12°W	SU6191
Benston	Shetland Islands	60.25°N 01.17°W	HU4653
Benter	Somerset	51.23°N 02.51°W	ST6449
Bentfield Bury	Essex	51.90°N 00.16°E	TL4925
Bentfield Green	Essex	51.90°N 00.17°E	TL5025
Bent Gate	Lancashire	53.68°N 02.31°W	SD7921
Bentgate	Rochdale	53.59°N 02.10°W	SD9311
Benthall	Shropshire	52.61°N 02.50°W	SJ6602
Bentham	Gloucestershire	51.84°N 02.13°W	SO9116
Benthoul	City of Aberdeen	57.11°N 02.33°W	NJ8003
Bentilee	City of Stoke-on-Trent	53.01°N 02.13°W	SJ9146
Bentlass	Pembrokeshire	51.67°N 04.95°W	SM9601
Bentlawnt	Shropshire	52.60°N 02.99°W	SJ3301
Bentley	Suffolk	51.99°N 01.07°W	TM1136
Bentley	Hampshire	51.19°N 00.88°W	SU7844
Bentley	Walsall	52.58°N 02.03°W	SO9898
Bentley	Warwickshire	52.55°N 01.58°W	SP2895
Bentley	Essex	51.64°N 00.25°E	TQ5696
Bentley	East Riding of Yorkshire	53.80°N 00.46°W	TA0135
Bentley	Doncaster	53.53°N 01.15°W	SE5605
Bentley Common	Warwickshire	52.56°N 01.58°W	SP2896
Bentley Heath	Solihull	52.37°N 01.76°W	SP1675
Bentley Heath	Hertfordshire	51.67°N 00.20°W	TQ2499
Bentley Rise	Doncaster	53.53°N 01.15°W	SE5604
Benton	Devon	51.10°N 03.92°W	SS6536
Benton Green	Solihull	52.40°N 01.63°W	SP2579
Bentpath	Dumfries and Galloway	55.19°N 03.08°W	NY3190
Bents	West Lothian	55.84°N 03.64°W	NS9762
Bents Head	Bradford	53.82°N 01.87°W	SE0836
Bentwitchen	Devon	51.08°N 03.81°W	SS7333
Bentworth	Hampshire	51.15°N 01.05°W	SU6640
Benvie	Perth and Kinross	56.46°N 03.10°W	NO3231
Benville	Dorset	50.82°N 02.65°W	ST5403
Benwell	Newcastle upon Tyne	54.97°N 01.67°W	NZ2164
Benwick	Cambridgeshire	52.49°N 00.02°W	TL3490
Beobridge	Shropshire	52.51°N 02.31°W	SO7991
Beoley	Worcestershire	52.31°N 01.91°W	SP0669
Beoraidbeg	Highland	56.96°N 05.83°W	NM6793
Bepton	West Sussex	50.95°N 00.79°W	SU8518

=== Ber ===
Location	Locality	Coordinates (links to map & photo sources)	OS grid reference
Berden	Essex	51.94°N 00.12°E	TL4629
Bere Alston	Devon	50.47°N 04.20°W	SX4466
Berechurch	Essex	51.86°N 00.88°E	TL9922
Bere Ferrers	Devon	50.44°N 04.18°W	SX4563
Berefold	Aberdeenshire	57.40°N 02.05°W	NJ9735
Berepper	Cornwall	50.05°N 05.28°W	SW6522
Bere Regis	Dorset	50.75°N 02.22°W	SY8495
Bergh Apton	Norfolk	52.55°N 01.39°E	TG3001
Berghers Hill	Buckinghamshire	51.57°N 00.68°W	SU9187
Berhill	Somerset	51.12°N 02.80°W	ST4436
Berinsfield	Oxfordshire	51.66°N 01.17°W	SU5796
Berkeley	Gloucestershire	51.68°N 02.46°W	ST6899
Berkeley Heath	Gloucestershire	51.68°N 02.44°W	ST6999
Berkeley Road	Gloucestershire	51.69°N 02.42°W	SO7100
Berkhamsted	Hertfordshire	51.76°N 00.58°W	SP9808
Berkley	Somerset	51.24°N 02.27°W	ST8149
Berkley Down	Somerset	51.23°N 02.30°W	ST7948
Berkley Marsh	Somerset	51.24°N 02.28°W	ST8049
Berkswell	Solihull	52.40°N 01.64°W	SP2479
Bermondsey	Southwark	51.49°N 00.08°W	TQ3379
Bermuda	Warwickshire	52.49°N 01.48°W	SP3589
Bernards Heath	Hertfordshire	51.75°N 00.33°W	TL1508
Berneray (Barra Isles)	Western Isles	56.78°N 07.63°W	NL560801
Berneray (North Uist)	Western Isles	57.72°N 07.18°W	NF917824
Berner's Cross	Devon	50.86°N 03.94°W	SS6309
Berner's Hill	East Sussex	51.04°N 00.42°E	TQ7030
Berners Roding	Essex	51.75°N 00.31°E	TL6009
Bernisdale	Highland	57.46°N 06.33°W	NG4050
Berrick Salome	Oxfordshire	51.64°N 01.10°W	SU6294
Berriedale	Highland	58.17°N 03.49°W	ND1222
Berrier	Cumbria	54.65°N 02.93°W	NY4029
Berriew	Powys	52.59°N 03.21°W	SJ1800
Berrington	Worcestershire	52.29°N 02.63°W	SO570675
Berrington	Northumberland	55.68°N 02.00°W	NU007431
Berrington	Shropshire	52.64°N 02.71°W	SJ529069
Berrington Green	Worcestershire	52.29°N 02.63°W	SO5766
Berriowbridge	Cornwall	50.54°N 04.44°W	SX2775
Berrow	Somerset	51.26°N 03.01°W	ST2952
Berrow	Worcestershire	52.00°N 02.30°W	SO7934
Berrow Green	Worcestershire	52.21°N 02.38°W	SO7458
Berry	Swansea	51.56°N 04.20°W	SS4787
Berry Brow	Kirklees	53.62°N 01.80°W	SE1314
Berry Cross	Devon	50.90°N 04.17°W	SS4714
Berry Down Cross	Devon	51.16°N 04.04°W	SS5743
Berryfield	Wiltshire	51.35°N 02.15°W	ST8962
Berrygate Hill	East Riding of Yorkshire	53.69°N 00.13°W	TA2324
Berry Hill	Gloucestershire	51.80°N 02.62°W	SO5712
Berry Hill	Pembrokeshire	52.02°N 04.82°W	SN0640
Berry Hill	City of Stoke-on-Trent	53.01°N 02.15°W	SJ9046
Berry Hill	Worcestershire	52.27°N 02.16°W	SO8964
Berryhillock	Moray	57.62°N 02.83°W	NJ5060
Berrylands	Kingston upon Thames	51.38°N 00.29°W	TQ1967
Berry Moor	Barnsley	53.52°N 01.56°W	SE2903
Berrynarbor	Devon	51.19°N 04.06°W	SS5646
Berry Pomeroy	Devon	50.43°N 03.66°W	SX8261
Berrysbridge	Devon	50.79°N 03.53°W	SS9201
Berry's Green	Bromley	51.31°N 00.05°E	TQ4359
Bersham	Wrexham	53.03°N 03.04°W	SJ3049
Berst Ness	Orkney Islands	59.26°N 02.98°W	HY437427
Berth-ddu	Flintshire	53.21°N 03.19°W	SJ2069
Berthengam	Flintshire	53.30°N 03.33°W	SJ1179
Berwick	Kent	51.07°N 01.02°E	TR1235
Berwick	East Sussex	50.82°N 00.14°E	TQ5105
Berwick	South Gloucestershire	51.51°N 02.64°W	ST5580
Berwick Bassett	Wiltshire	51.45°N 01.87°W	SU0973
Berwick Hill	Northumberland	55.06°N 01.73°W	NZ1775
Berwick Hills	Middlesbrough	54.55°N 01.21°W	NZ5118
Berwick St James	Wiltshire	51.15°N 01.90°W	SU0739
Berwick St John	Wiltshire	50.99°N 02.08°W	ST9422
Berwick St Leonard	Wiltshire	51.09°N 02.11°W	ST9233
Berwick-upon-Tweed	Northumberland	55.76°N 02.01°W	NT9952
Berwick Wharf	Shropshire	52.69°N 02.68°W	SJ5411
Berwyn	Denbighshire	52.97°N 03.20°W	SJ1943

=== Bes–Bey ===
Location	Locality	Coordinates (links to map & photo sources)	OS grid reference
Bescaby	Leicestershire	52.82°N 00.78°W	SK8226
Bescar	Lancashire	53.61°N 02.92°W	SD3913
Bescot	Sandwell	52.56°N 02.00°W	SP0096
Besford	Worcestershire	52.09°N 02.13°W	SO9144
Besford	Shropshire	52.81°N 02.66°W	SJ5524
Bessacarr	Doncaster	53.50°N 01.08°W	SE6101
Bessels Green	Kent	51.27°N 00.14°E	TQ5055
Bessels Leigh	Oxfordshire	51.70°N 01.35°W	SP4501
Besses o' th' Barn	Bury	53.54°N 02.28°W	SD8105
Bessingby	East Riding of Yorkshire	54.06°N 00.24°W	TA1565
Bessingham	Norfolk	52.87°N 01.20°E	TG1636
Best Beech Hill	East Sussex	51.05°N 00.29°E	TQ6131
Besthorpe	Norfolk	52.51°N 01.03°E	TM0695
Besthorpe	Nottinghamshire	53.16°N 00.77°W	SK8264
Bestwood	Nottinghamshire	52.99°N 01.16°W	SK5645
Bestwood Village	Nottinghamshire	53.01°N 01.18°W	SK5547
Beswick	East Riding of Yorkshire	53.91°N 00.46°W	TA0148
Beswick	Manchester	53.46°N 02.21°W	SJ8697
Betchcott	Shropshire	52.57°N 02.84°W	SO4398
Betchton Heath	Cheshire	53.13°N 02.34°W	SJ7760
Betchworth	Surrey	51.23°N 00.26°W	TQ2150
Bethania	Ceredigion	52.24°N 04.09°W	SN5763
Bethania (Blaenau Ffestiniog)	Gwynedd	52.98°N 03.93°W	SH7045
Bethania (Snowdonia)	Gwynedd	53.02°N 04.05°W	SH6250
Bethany	Cornwall	50.40°N 04.36°W	SX3259
Bethasda	Gwynedd	53.17°N 04.06°W	SH6266
Bethel	Isle of Anglesey	53.20°N 04.41°W	SH3970
Bethel	Cornwall	50.33°N 04.76°W	SX0352
Bethel (near Bala)	Gwynedd	52.93°N 03.51°W	SH9839
Bethel (Llanddeiniolen)	Gwynedd	53.16°N 04.21°W	SH5265
Bethersden	Kent	51.12°N 00.74°E	TQ9240
Bethesda	Pembrokeshire	51.81°N 04.77°W	SN0917
Bethesda Bach	Gwynedd	53.07°N 04.30°W	SH4656
Bethlehem	Carmarthenshire	51.90°N 03.92°W	SN6825
Bethnal Green	Tower Hamlets	51.527°N 00.056°W	TQ3482
Betley	Staffordshire	53.02°N 02.37°W	SJ7548
Betley Common	Cheshire	53.02°N 02.38°W	SJ7448
Betsham	Kent	51.41°N 00.29°E	TQ6071
Betteshanger	Kent	51.22°N 01.30°E	TR3152
Bettiscombe	Dorset	50.79°N 02.86°W	ST3900
Bettisfield	Wrexham	52.91°N 02.80°W	SJ4635
Betton	Shropshire	52.92°N 02.46°W	SJ6936
Betton Strange	Shropshire	52.67°N 02.74°W	SJ5009
Bettws	Monmouthshire	51.86°N 03.03°W	SO2919
Bettws	City of Newport	51.60°N 03.02°W	ST2990
Bettws Cedewain	Powys	52.55°N 03.29°W	SO1296
Betws Gwerfil Goch	Denbighshire	53.00°N 03.44°W	SJ0346
Bettws Newydd	Monmouthshire	51.74°N 02.92°W	SO3605
Bettws-y-Crwyn	Shropshire	52.42°N 03.17°W	SO2081
Bettyhill	Highland	58.51°N 04.23°W	NC7061
Betws	Carmarthenshire	51.78°N 03.98°W	SN6311
Betws	Bridgend	51.56°N 03.60°W	SS8986
Betws Bledrws	Ceredigion	52.14°N 04.06°W	SN5952
Betws Garmon	Gwynedd	53.08°N 04.18°W	SH5456
Betws Ifan	Ceredigion	52.09°N 04.48°W	SN3047
Betws-y-Coed	Conwy	53.08°N 03.80°W	SH7956
Betws-yn-Rhos	Conwy	53.25°N 03.66°W	SH8974
Beulah	Ceredigion	52.08°N 04.51°W	SN2846
Beulah	Powys	52.14°N 03.57°W	SN9251
Bevendean	Brighton and Hove	50.83°N 00.09°W	TQ3406
Bevere	Worcestershire	52.22°N 02.23°W	SO8459
Beverley	East Riding of Yorkshire	53.84°N 00.42°W	TA0440
Beverston	Gloucestershire	51.63°N 02.20°W	ST8693
Bevington	South Gloucestershire	51.66°N 02.50°W	ST6596
Bewaldeth	Cumbria	54.69°N 03.22°W	NY2134
Bewbush	West Sussex	51.10°N 00.23°W	TQ2435
Bewcastle	Cumbria	55.05°N 02.69°W	NY5674
Bewdley	Worcestershire	52.37°N 02.32°W	SO7875
Bewerley	North Yorkshire	54.07°N 01.77°W	SE1564
Bewholme	East Riding of Yorkshire	53.93°N 00.23°W	TA1650
Bewley Common	Wiltshire	51.41°N 02.10°W	ST9368
Bewlie	Scottish Borders	55.51°N 02.69°W	NT5625
Bewlie Mains	Scottish Borders	55.51°N 02.71°W	NT5525
Bewsey	Cheshire	53.39°N 02.61°W	SJ5989
Bexfield	Norfolk	52.78°N 00.99°E	TG0225
Bexhill	East Sussex	50.84°N 00.45°E	TQ7308
Bexley	Kent	51.45°N 00.10°E	TQ4675
Bexleyheath	Kent	51.45°N 00.12°E	TQ4875
Bexleyhill	West Sussex	51.01°N 00.70°W	SU9125
Bexley Village	Kent	51.45°N 00.10°E	TQ4675
Bexon	Kent	51.29°N 00.70°E	TQ8959
Bexwell	Norfolk	52.60°N 00.40°E	TF6303
Beyton	Suffolk	52.23°N 00.82°E	TL9363
Beyton Green	Suffolk	52.23°N 00.82°E	TL9363
