= Berrow =

Berrow may refer to:

== Places ==
- Berrow, Somerset
- Berrow, Worcestershire

== People with the surname ==
- Capel Berrow (1716–1782), English divine

== See also ==
- Berrow Green
- Berrow's Worcester Journal, a British newspaper established in 1690
