= Berrington =

Berrington may refer to

== Places in England ==
- Berrington, Northumberland
- Berrington, Shropshire
  - Berrington railway station
- Berrington, Worcestershire
- Berrington Green, Worcestershire
- Berrington Hall, a country house near Leominster, Herefordshire
  - Berrington and Eye railway station, a former station near Berrington Hall

== Ships ==
- Berrington (ship), two merchant ships, including:
  - Berrington (1783 EIC ship), an East Indiaman

== Persons ==
- Elizabeth Berrington (born 1970), English actress
- Emily Berrington (born 1985), English actress
