= Bentfield =

Bentfield may refer to the following places in Essex, England:

- Bentfield Bury
- Bentfield Green
