= River Pont =

River in Northumberland, England

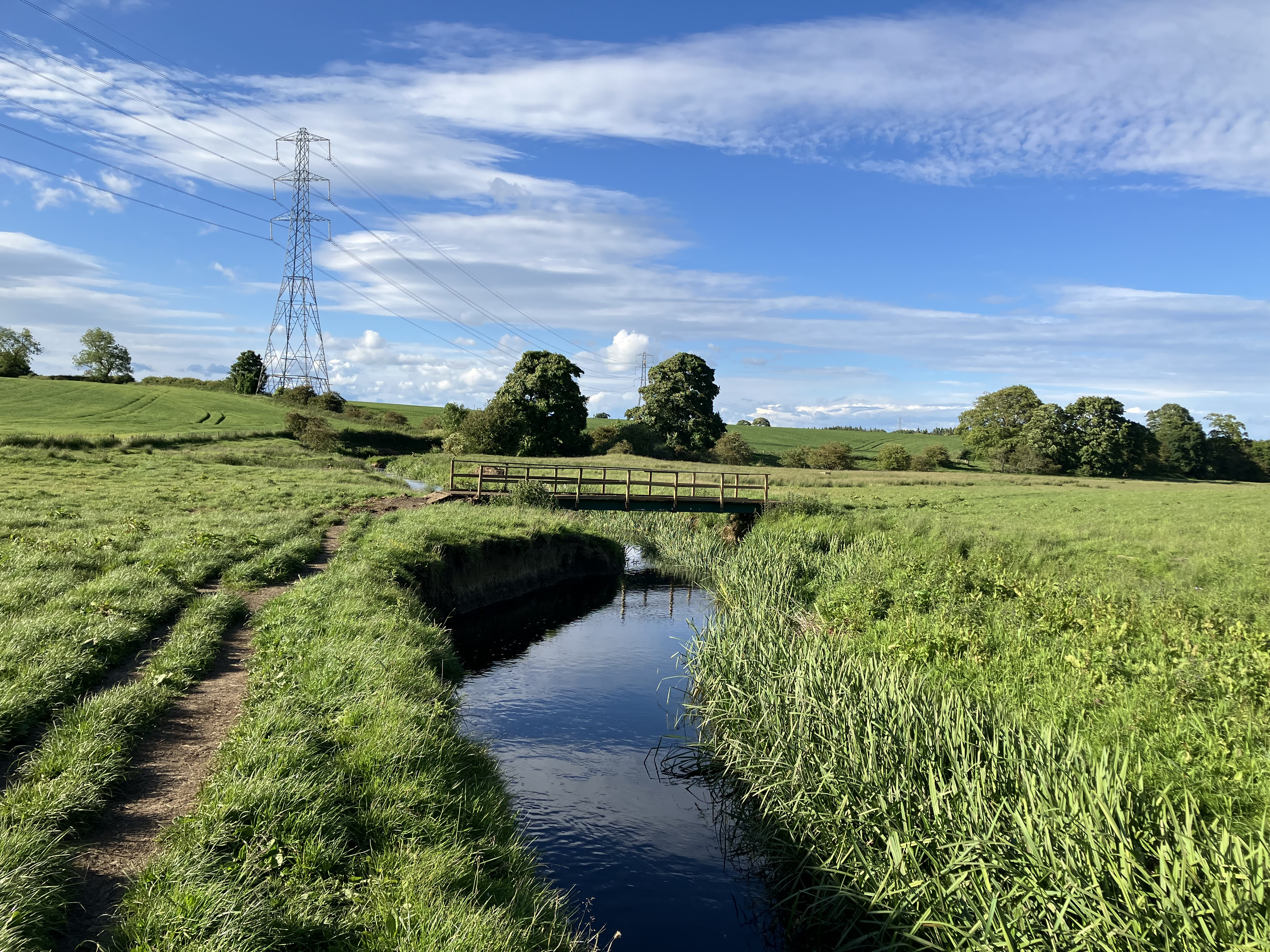
- River Pont near Ponteland

Location
- Country: United Kingdom
- County: Northumberland

Physical characteristics
- Source
  - location: Whittington Fell
- Mouth
  - location: River Blyth
  - coordinates: 55°05′36″N 1°43′19″W
- Length: 28 km (17 mi)

The River Pont is a river in Northumberland, England, and is a tributary of the River Blyth. It is 17 miles (28 km) in length. It has minor tributaries, which include the Med Burn, Fenwick Burn, and Small Burn.

The name Pont derives from Brittonic *pant, meaning 'valley'. The river gives its name to Ponteland.

The source of the River Pont is located near Great Whittington. It flows by Stamfordham, and the Med Burn flows into the Pont soon after in Dalton. It continues, passing through Ponteland, and which the Small Burn and Coldcoats Burn flows into. It continues to flow northward until flowing into the River Blyth near Berwick Hill.
