= Bevington =

Bevington can refer to:

== People ==
- David Bevington (1931–2019), academic
- Dennis Bevington (born 1953), politician
- Helen Bevington (1906–2001), poet
- Henry Bevington (1777–1850), English organ builder
- Stan Bevington, proprietor of Coach House Press, Toronto
- Terry Bevington (born 1956), baseball manager

== Places ==
- Bevington, Gloucestershire, a location in England
- Bevington, Iowa, United States
