= Edge rail =

Edge rail or edge rails may refer to:

- Edge rail (edgeways), in wagonways
- Edge rail (rail profile), in railways
- Edge rails (PCB), a single-board panelization method in printed circuit board manufacturing
