= Wagonway =

Railway using horses to pull goods wagons

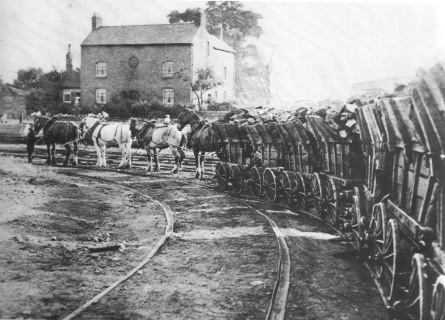
Benjamin Outram's Little Eaton Gangway in July 1908 with the last train of loaded coal wagons arriving.

A wagonway (or waggonway; also known as a horse-drawn tramway, horse-drawn railway, or horse-drawn railroad) was a method of railway transportation that preceded the steam locomotive and used horses to haul wagons. The terms plateway and tramway were also used. The advantage of wagonways was that far heavier loads could be transported with the same power compared to horse haulage along roads.

== Ancient systems ==
The earliest evidence is of the 6 to 8.5 km (3.7 to 5.3 mi) long Diolkos paved trackway, which transported boats across the Isthmus of Corinth in Greece from around 600 BC. Wheeled vehicles pulled by men and animals ran in grooves in limestone, which provided the track element, preventing the wagons from leaving the intended route. The Diolkos was in use for over 650 years, until at least the 1st century AD. Paved trackways were later built in Roman Egypt.

== Wooden rails ==
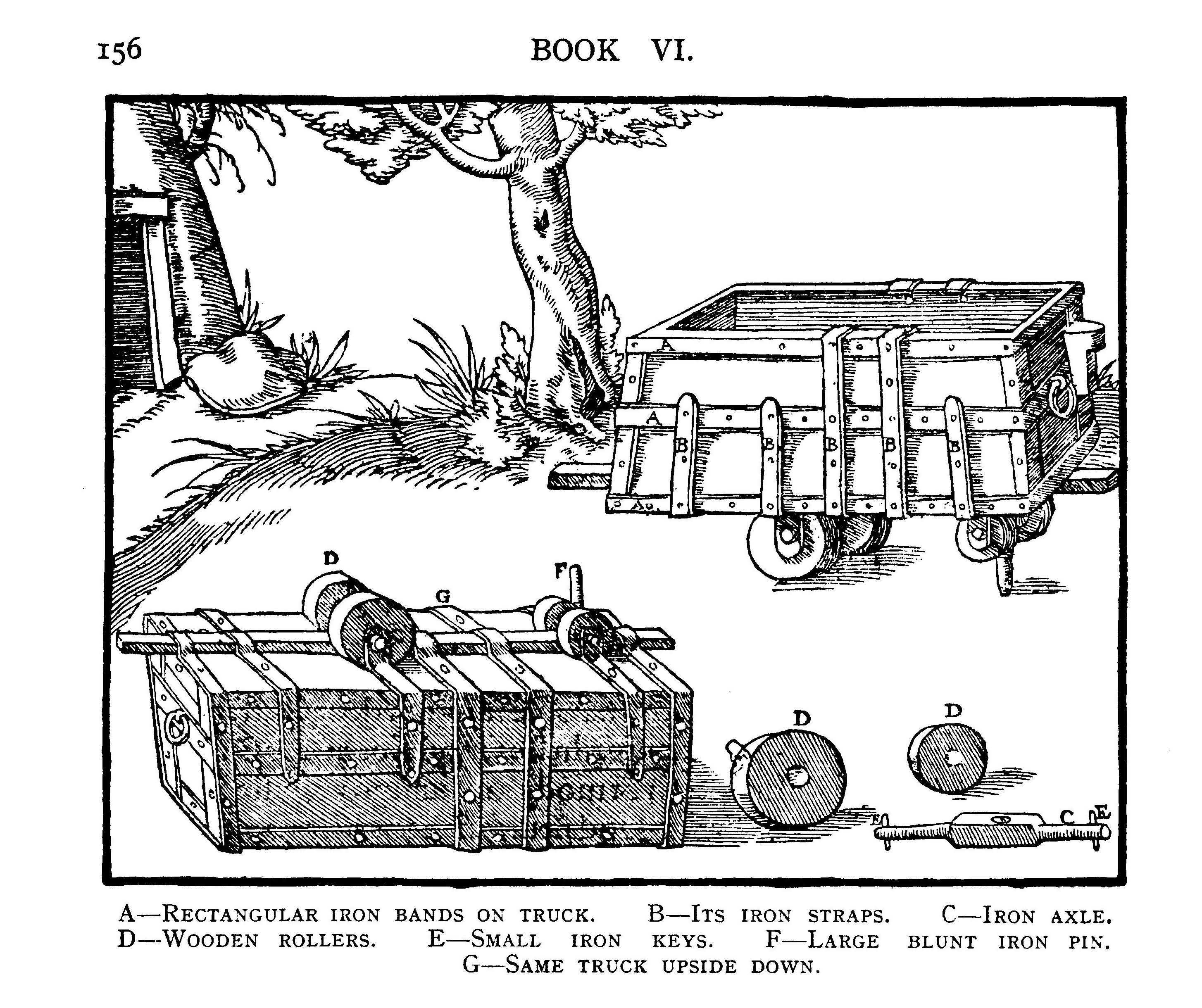
Minecart shown in De re metallica (1556). The guide pin fits in a groove between two wooden planks.

Such an operation was illustrated in Germany in 1556 by Georgius Agricola (image left) in his work De re metallica. This line used "Hund" carts with unflanged wheels running on wooden planks and a vertical pin on the truck fitting into the gap between the planks to keep it going the right way. The miners called the wagons Hunde ("dogs") from the noise they made on the tracks.

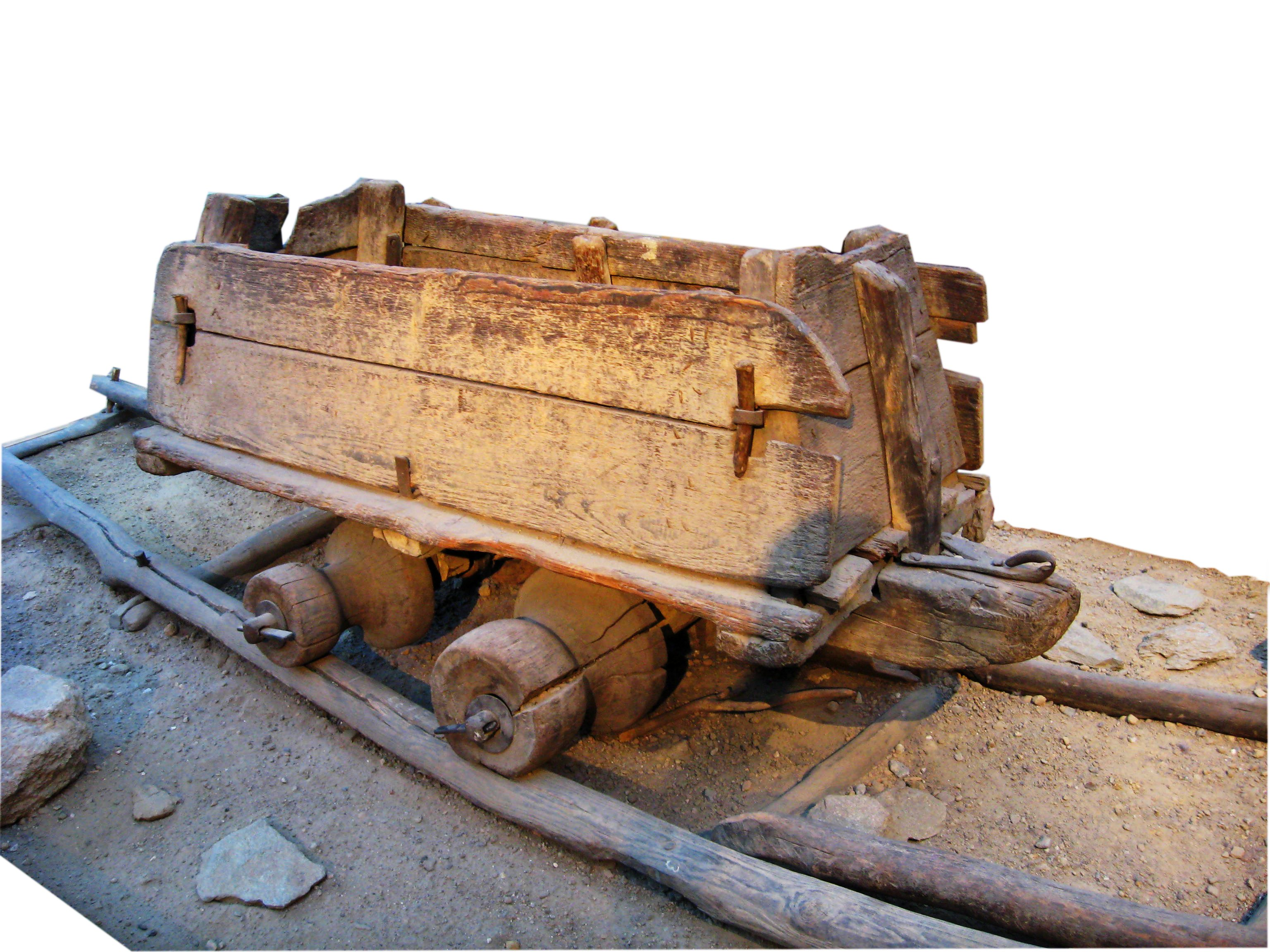
Minecart from 16th century, found in Transylvania

Around 1568, German miners working in the Mines Royal near Keswick used such a system. Archaeological work at the Mines Royal site at Caldbeck in the English Lake District confirmed the use of "Hunde".

In 1604, Huntingdon Beaumont completed the Wollaton Wagonway, built to transport coal from the mines at Strelley to Wollaton Lane End, just west of Nottingham, England. Wagonways have been discovered between Broseley and Jackfield in Shropshire from 1605, used by James Clifford to transport coal from his mines in Broseley to the Severn River. It has been suggested that these are somewhat older than that at Wollaton.

In 1610, Beaumont introduced wooden waggonways as a form of coal transport in South East Northumberland, waggons with one horse were used to carry coals from the local pits to the port on the River Blyth. From 1692 to 1709, the Plessey Waggonway was constructed from Plessey to Blyth, following the route of Plessey Road, where it derives its name. It was constructed of a double-line of beech rails on oak sleepers. The waggons had wooden wheels with nails driven into them to reduce wear on the wheels.

The Middleton Railway in Leeds, which was built in 1758 as a wagonway, later became the world's first operational railway (other than funiculars), albeit in an upgraded form. In 1764, the first railway in America was built in Lewiston, New York as a wagonway.

At Bersham Ironworks records exist from 1757 to 1759 of contracts to lay a railroad from coal and iron pits to the works, and in 1991 40 m (130 ft) of track were excavated at the works including a set of points. The track was made with oak sleepers and ash rails, and was 4 ft 1 in (1,245 mm) gauge.

Wagonways improved coal transport by allowing one horse to deliver between 10 and 13 long tons (10.2–13.2 t; 11.2–14.6 short tons) of coal per run—an approximate fourfold increase. Wagonways were usually designed to carry the fully loaded wagons downhill to a canal or boat dock and then return the empty wagons back to the mine.

== Metal rails ==
Until the beginning of the Industrial Revolution, rails were made of wood, were a few inches wide and were fastened end to end, on logs of wood or "sleepers", placed crosswise at intervals of two or three feet. In time, it became common to cover them with a thin flat sheathing or "plating" of iron, in order to add to their life and reduce friction. This caused more wear on the wooden rollers of the wagons and towards the middle of the 18th century, led to the introduction of iron wheels. However, the iron sheathing was not strong enough to resist buckling under the passage of the loaded wagons, so rails made wholly of iron were invented.

In 1760, the Coalbrookdale Iron Works began to reinforce their wooden-railed tramway with iron bars, which were found to facilitate passage and diminish expenses. As a result, in 1767, they began to make cast iron rails. These were probably 6 ft (1.829 m) long, with four projecting ears or lugs 3 by 3 3/4 in (75 × 95 mm) to enable them to be fixed to the sleepers. The rails were 3 3/4 in (95 mm) wide and 1 1/4 in (30 mm) thick. Later, descriptions also refer to rails 3 ft (914 mm) long and only 2 in (50 mm) wide.

=== Plateways, flangeways ===
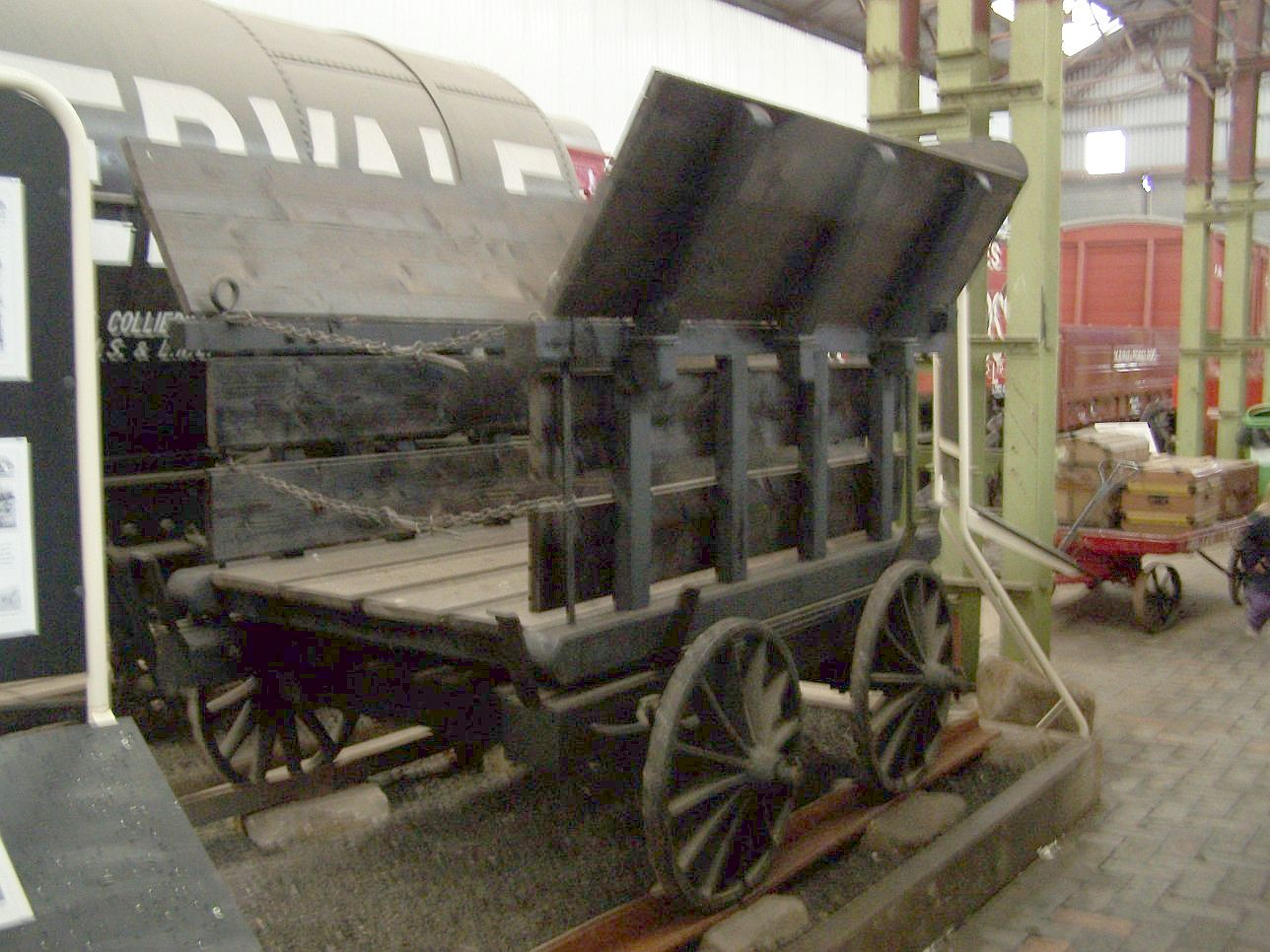
A replica of a "Little Eaton Tramway" wagon; the tracks are plateways

A later system involved L-shaped iron rails or plates, each 3 ft (914 mm) long and 4 in (102 mm) wide, having on the inner side an upright ledge or flange, 3 in (76 mm) high at the centre and tapering to 2 in (51 mm) at the ends, for the purpose of keeping the flat wheels on the track. Subsequently, to increase strength, a similar flange might be added below the rail. Wooden sleepers continued to be used—the rails were secured by spikes passing through the extremities—but, circa 1793, stone blocks began to be used, an innovation associated with Benjamin Outram, although he was not the originator. This type of rail was known as the plate-rail, tramway-plate or way-plate, names that are preserved in the modern term "platelayer" applied to the workers who lay and maintain the permanent way. The wheels of flangeway wagons were plain, but they could not operate on ordinary roads as the narrow rims would dig into the surface.

=== Edgeways ===
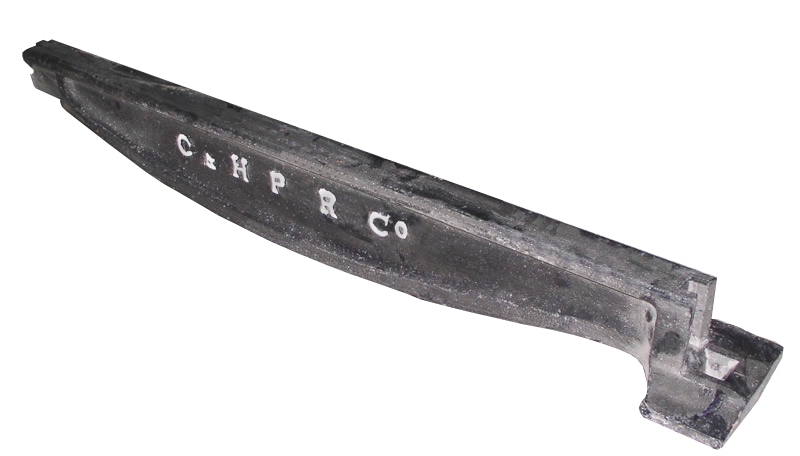
Cast iron fishbelly edge rail manufactured by Outram at the Butterley Company ironworks for the Cromford and High Peak Railway (1831). These are smooth edgerails for wheels with flanges.

Another form of rail, the edge rail, was first used by William Jessop on a line that was opened as part of the Charnwood Forest Canal between Loughborough and Nanpantan in Leicestershire in 1789. This line was originally designed as a plateway on the Outram system, but objections were raised to laying rails with upstanding ledges or flanges on the turnpike. This difficulty was overcome by paving or "causewaying" the road up to the level of the top of the flanges. In 1790, Jessop and his partner Outram began to manufacture edge-rails. Another example of the edge rail application was the Lake Lock Rail Road in the West Riding of Yorkshire (now West Yorkshire) used primarily for coal transport. The railway charged a toll and opened for traffic in 1798, making it the world's oldest public railway. The route started at Lake Lock, Stanley, on the Aire & Calder Navigation, running from Wakefield to Outwood, a distance of approximately 3 miles (4.8 km). Edge-rails (with a side rack) were used on the nearby Middleton-Leeds rack railway (a length of this rail is on display in Leeds City Museum). The wheels of an edgeway have flanges, like modern railways and tramways. Causewaying is also done on modern level crossings and tramways.

These two systems of constructing iron railways continued to exist until the early 19th century. In most parts of England the plate-rail was preferred. Plate-rails were used on the Surrey Iron Railway (SIR), from Wandsworth to West Croydon. The SIR was sanctioned by Parliament in 1801 and finished in 1803. Like the Lake Lock Rail Road, the SIR was available to the public on payment of tolls; previous lines had all been private and reserved exclusively for the use of their owners. Since it was used by individual operators, vehicles would vary greatly in wheel spacing (gauge) and the plate rail coped better. In South Wales again, where in 1811 the railways were connected with canals, collieries, ironworks, and copper works, and had a total length of nearly 150 miles (241 km), the plateway was almost universal. But in the North of England and in Scotland the edge-rail was held in greater favour, and soon its superiority was generally established. Wheels tended to bind against the flange of the plate rail and mud and stones would build up.

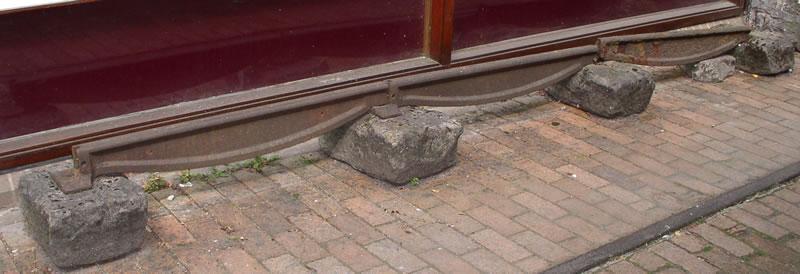
Lengths of fishbelly rail on stone support blocks. These are edgerails for wheels with flanges.

The manufacture of the rails themselves was gradually improved. By making them in longer lengths, the number of joints per mile was reduced. Joints were always the weakest part of the line. Another advance was the substitution of wrought iron for cast iron, though that material did not gain wide adoption until after the patent for an improved method of rolling rails was granted in 1820 to John Birkinshaw, of the Bedlington Ironworks. His rails were wedge-shaped in section, much wider at the top than at the bottom, with the intermediate portion or web thinner still. He recommended that they be made 18 ft (5.49 m) long, suggesting that several might be welded together end to end to form considerable lengths. They were supported on sleepers by chairs at intervals of 3 ft (914 mm), and were fish-bellied between the support points. As used by George Stephenson on the Stockton & Darlington, and Canterbury & Whitstable lines, they weighed 28 lb/yd (13.9 kg/m). On the Liverpool and Manchester Railway they were usually 12 or 15 ft (3.66 or 4.57 m) long and weighed 35 lb/yd (17.4 kg/m) and were fastened by iron wedges to chairs weighing 15 or 17 lb (6.8 or 7.7 kg) each. The chairs were in turn fixed to the sleepers by two iron spikes, half-round wooden cross sleepers employed on embankments and stone blocks 20 in (508 mm) square by 10 in (254 mm) deep in cuttings. The fish-bellied rails were found to break near the chairs and starting in 1834, they were gradually replaced with parallel rails weighing 50 lb/yd (24.8 kg/m).

== Steam power ==
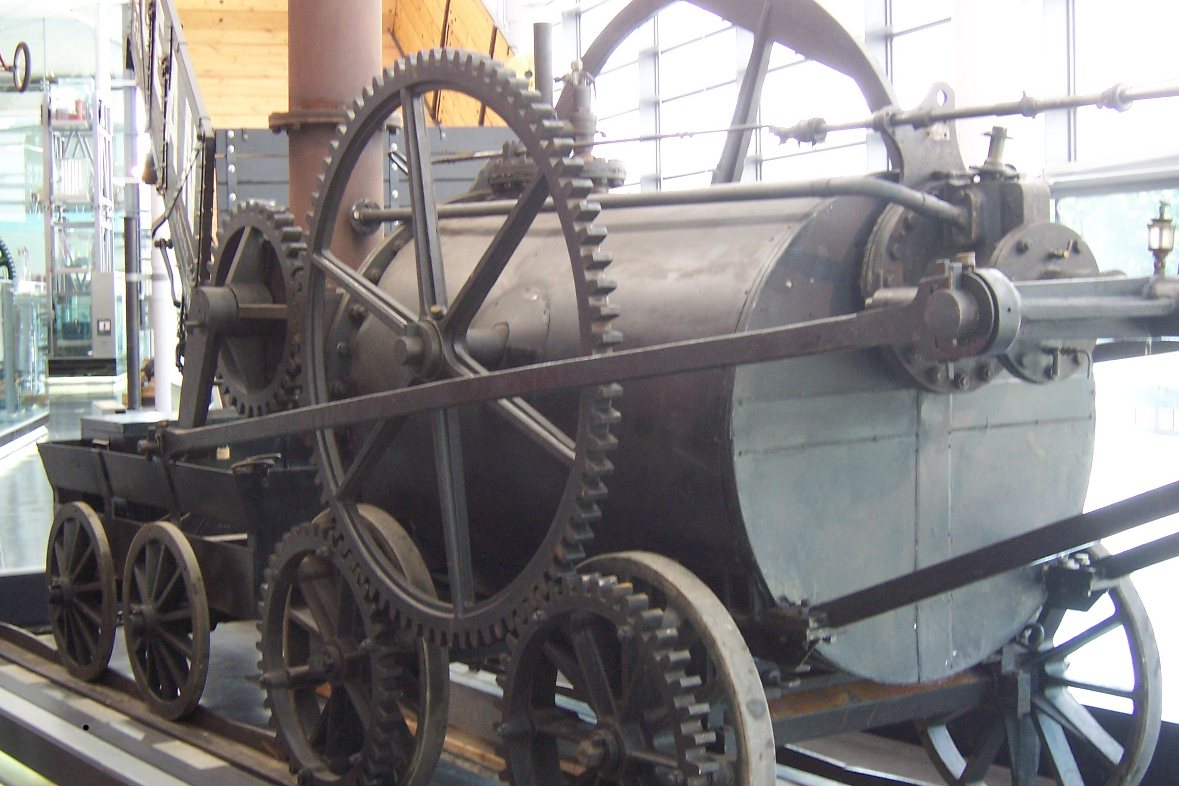
A replica of Trevithick's engine at the National Waterfront Museum, Swansea

In 1804, Richard Trevithick, in the first recorded use of steam power on a railway, ran a high-pressure steam locomotive with smooth wheels on an 'L' section plateway near Merthyr Tydfil, but it was more expensive than horses. He made three trips from the iron mines at Penydarren to the Merthyr–Cardiff Canal and each time broke the rails that were designed for horse wagon loads. There was general doubt at the time that smooth wheels could obtain traction on smooth rails. This resulted in proposals using rack or other drive mechanisms.

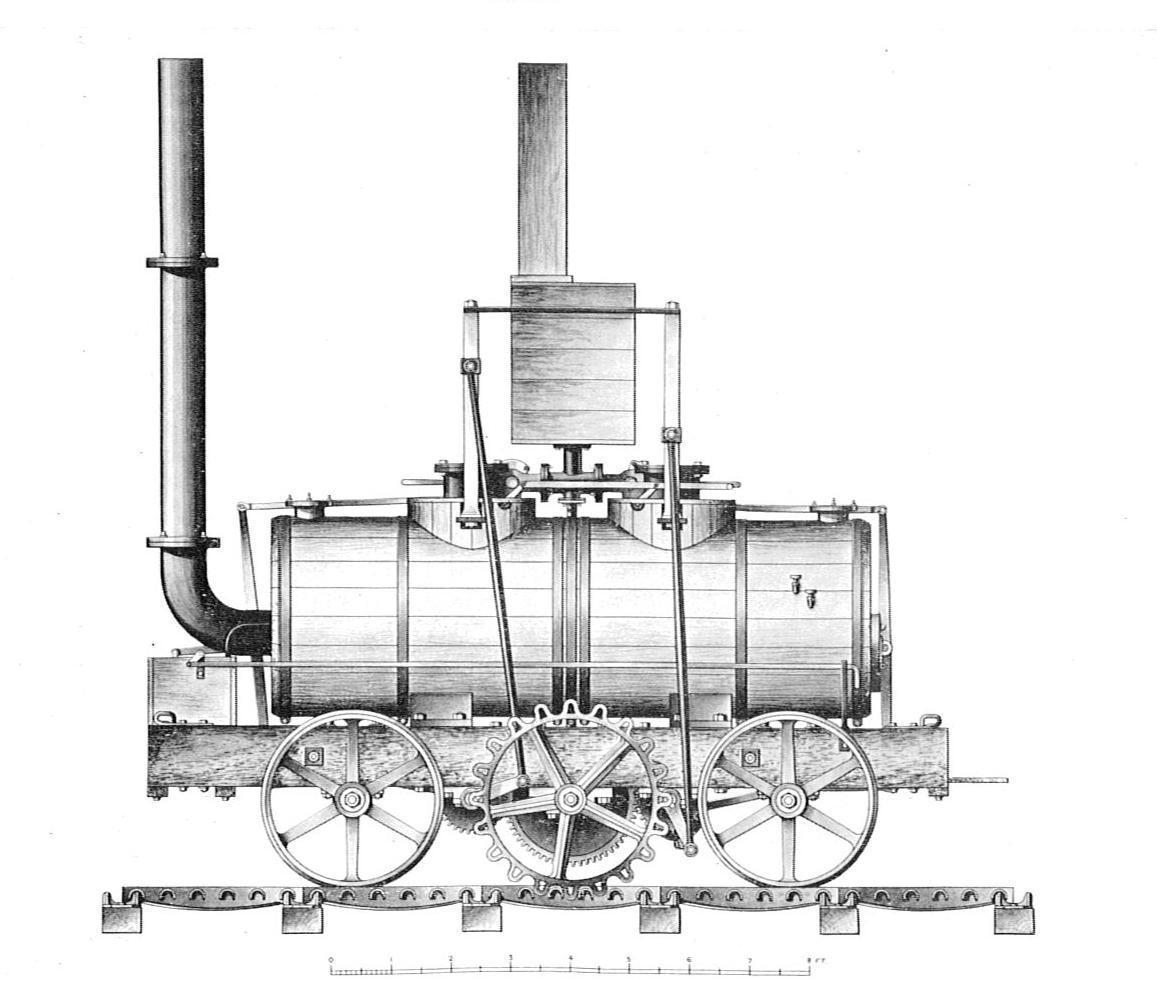
The Salamanca locomotive

Mr Blenkinsop of Middleton Colliery patented the use of cogged wheels in 1811 and in 1812, the Middleton Railway (edgeway, rack rail) successfully used twin cylinder steam locomotives made by Matthew Murray of Holbeck, Leeds. George Stephenson made his first steam locomotive in 1813 (patented 1815) for the Killingworth colliery, and found smooth wheels on smooth rails provided adequate grip. Although he later recounted that they called this locomotive 'My Lord' as it was financed by Lord Ravensworth, it seems that it was known at the time as Blücher. In 1814 William Stewart was engaged by Parkend Coal Co. in the Forest of Dean for the construction of a steam locomotive, which when trialled was reported to be successful. Stewart did not receive his expected reward and the two parties parted on bad terms. Stewart was "obliged to abandon the engine to that Company". In 1821 when a wagonway was proposed to connect the mines at West Durham, Darlington and the River Tees at Stockton, George Stephenson successfully argued that horse-drawn wagonways were obsolete and a steam-powered railway could carry 50 times as much coal. In 1825 he built the locomotive Locomotion for the Stockton and Darlington Railway in England's northeast, which became the world's first public steam railway in 1825, via both horse power and steam power on different runs.

Stationary steam engines for mining were generally available around the middle of the 18th century. Wagonways and steam-powered railways had steep uphill sections and would employ a cable powered by a stationary steam engine to work the inclined sections. British troops in Lewiston, New York used a cable wagonway to move supplies to bases before the American Revolutionary War. The Stockton and Darlington had two inclined sections powered by cable. The transition from a wagonway to a fully steam-powered railway was gradual. Railways up to the 1830s that were steam-powered often made runs with horses when the steam locomotives were unavailable. Even in the steam age, it was convenient to use horses in station yards to shunt wagons from one place to another. Horses do not need lengthy times to raise steam in the boiler, and can take shortcuts from one siding to another. At Hamley Bridge tenders were called for the supply of horses, in part because normal railway staff lacked horse handling skills.

== Pole road ==
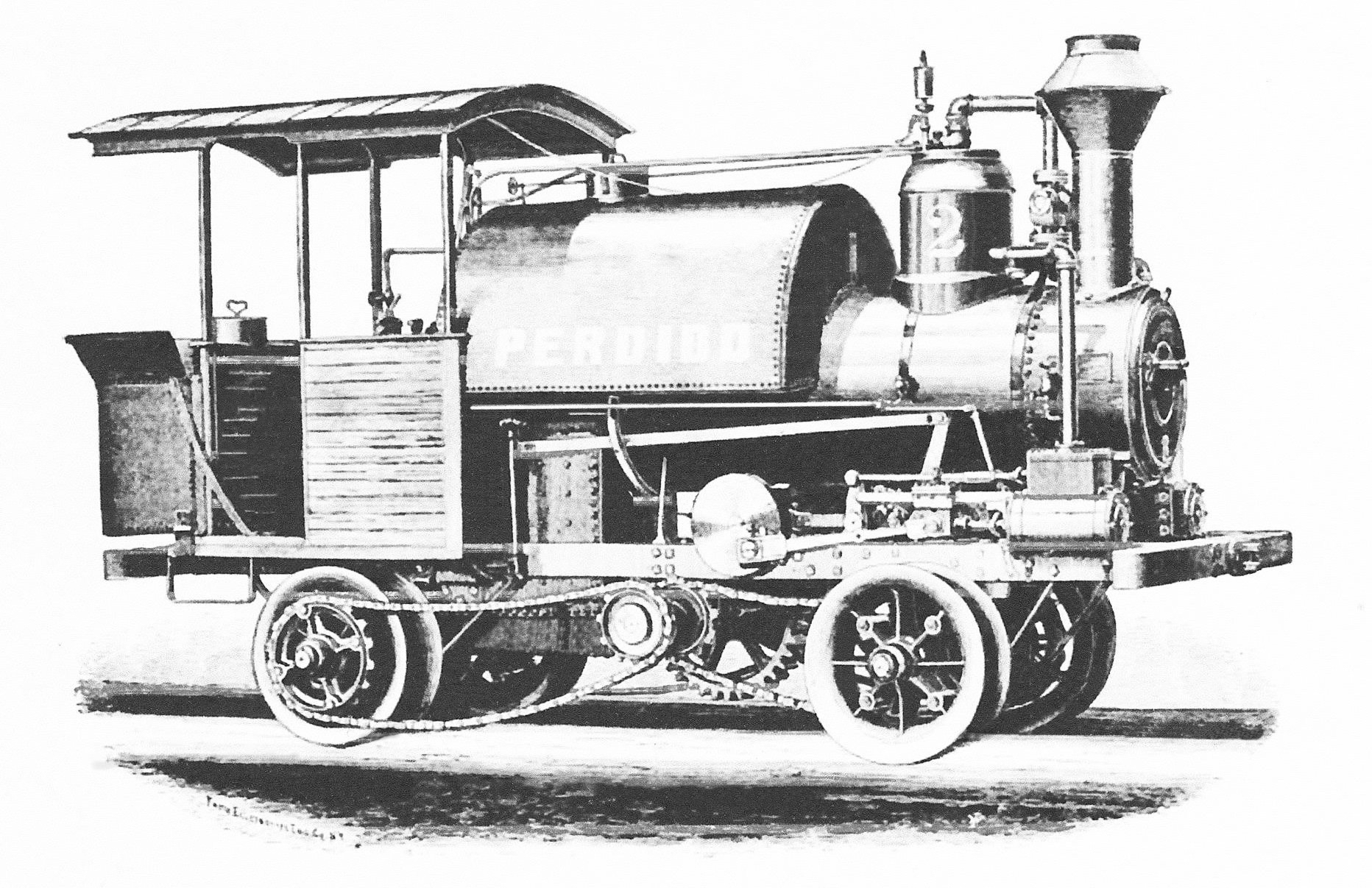
Perdido, a steam pole road locomotive

Wooden rails continued to be used for temporary railroads into the twentieth century. Some timber harvesting companies in the southeastern United States created pole roads using unmarketable logs, which were effectively free, to create tracks at a cost of between $100 and $500 per mile. Permanence was not an issue, as the lumberjacks moved on to other stands of timber as each area was cleared. At least one such pole road system reportedly extended some 20 miles (32 km).

Typically the pole rails were logs of 8 to 12 inches (20 to 30 cm) diameter, laid parallel directly on the ground without sleepers, and joined end-to-end with lap joints and wooden pegs. Rolling stock typically had wheels either with concave rims that hugged the top of the pole rails, or un-flanged wheels with separate guide wheels running against the side of each rail. Steam traction engines and some purpose-built locomotives were successfully used for hauling trains of logs. For example, Perdido was built by Adams & Price Locomotive and Machinery Works of Nashville, Tennessee in 1885 for the Wallace, Sanford and Company sawmill at Williams Station, Alabama, where it hauled up to seven cars of 3 or 4 logs each. This was a geared engine (4.5 to 1 gear ratio), driving four individually-rotating concave-rim wheels on stationary axles via chain drives; powerful but running less than 5 miles per hour (8.0 km/h). Still later, modified semitrailer tractors have been used.

== Decline ==
As steam power gradually replaced horse power throughout the 19th century, the term "wagonway" became obsolete and was superseded by the term "railway". As of 2026, very few horse or cable freight railways are operating, notable examples being the cable-hauled St Michael's Mount Tramway and the Reisszug, which has been in continuous operation since around 1900. A few passenger lines continue to operate, including the horse-hauled Douglas Bay Horse Tramway and the cable-hauled San Francisco cable cars.

== See also ==
- Barlow rail
- Granite Railway
- Guide rail
- Hay Railway
- Holy Island Waggonway
- Horsecar – Horse-powered tram or streetcar
- Mine railway
- Rail profile
- List of horse-drawn railways
- New Berlin horse-drawn tramway

== Bibliography ==
- Gwyn, David. The coming of the railway: a new global history.Yale University Press, 2023
- Smiles, Samuel; Stephenson, George (1858). The life of George Stephenson, Railway Engineer (PDF). London: Ticknor and Fields. OCLC 162233825. Archived (PDF) from the original on 3 July 2015.
- Westwood, John Norton (1988). The Pictorial History of Railways. London: Bison Books. ISBN 0-86124-446-X. OCLC 34774624.
