= Berrington (ship) =

Two ships have sailed for the British East India Company (EIC), under the name Berrington:

- Berrington (1721 EIC ship) made two voyages for the EIC; she was wrecked in 1730 at the entrance to Bombay Harbour while on her third voyage.
- Berrington (1783 EIC ship) made six voyages as an East Indiaman for the British East India Company (EIC). She then became a West Indiaman before again making a voyage under the auspices of the EIC bringing rice from Bengal to England for the British government. She returned to Indian waters and was last listed in 1807.
