= Bentwitchen =

Hamlet in Devon, England

Coordinates: 51.092°N 03.815°W

- Location within Devon
- OS grid reference: SS7333
- Civil parish: North Molton
- District: North Devon
- Shire county: Devon
- Region: South West
- Country: England
- Sovereign state: United Kingdom
- Post town: South Molton
- Postcode district: EX36
- Police: Devon and Cornwall
- Fire: Devon and Somerset
- Ambulance: South Western

Bentwitchen is a hamlet in Devon, England.

== Etymology ==
Bentwitchen first appeared in the Devon Lay Subsidy Rolls as Bayntwichene in 1330, but was later recorded in historical survey circa 1581 as Baintwitchin, later in 1609 it was recorded as Bentwichin. The prevailing theory is it comes from Old English and translates into "Baega's Crossways", with "Baega" being an Old English personal name possibly belonging to an early landowner or settler and the second element -witchen coming from the Middle English word "twichen(e)" which means a crossroads, narrow lane, or the meeting of roads.
