= Benington, Lincolnshire =

Village and civil parish in the Borough of Boston in Lincolnshire, England

Coordinates: 52.995020°N 0.079338°E

Benington
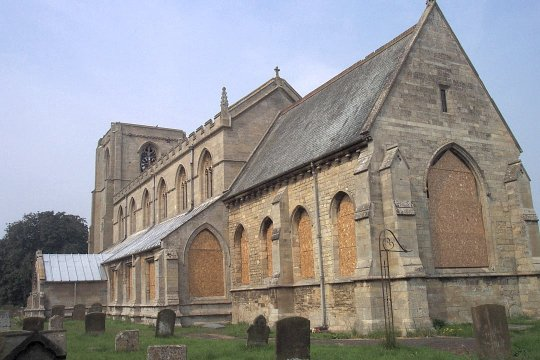
- All Saints, Benington, in 2003

- Location within Lincolnshire
- Population: 580 (2011)
- OS grid reference: TF396462
  - London: 100 mi (160 km) S
- District: Boston (borough)
- Shire county: Lincolnshire
- Region: East Midlands
- Country: England
- Sovereign state: United Kingdom
- Post town: Boston
- Postcode district: PE22
- Police: Lincolnshire
- Fire: Lincolnshire
- Ambulance: East Midlands
- UK Parliament: Boston and Skegness (UK Parliament constituency)

Benington is a village and civil parish in the Borough of Boston in Lincolnshire, England, and approximately 4 miles (6 km) east of Boston, and on the A52 road. The parish contains the hamlets of Benington Sea End and West End. Nearby villages are Butterwick and Leverton.

Benington parish has a population of 569, increasing to 580 at the 2011 Census. It is one of eighteen parishes which, together with Boston, form the borough. Local government has been arranged in this way since the reorganisation of 1 April 1974, which resulted from the Local Government Act 1972. The parish forms part of the Coastal electoral ward. Hitherto, the parish had formed part of Boston Rural District, in the Parts of Holland. Holland was one of the three divisions (formally known as parts) of the traditional county of Lincolnshire. Since the Local Government Act 1888, Holland had been in most respects, a county in itself.

The name derives from Old English meaning "Bennas farm or settlement".

The parish church is a Grade I listed building dedicated to All Saints and dating from the 13th to 15th centuries, although it was restored in 1873 by James Fowler of Louth. It has a 14th-century font. It closed as a church in 2003 (with its last service in 2001) and was boarded up. In 2015, the Benington Community Heritage Trust received a grant from the Heritage Lottery Fund, and as at early 2021 it is being refurbished for use as a community centre "The Beonna at All Saints" (named after Beonna, an eighth century king of East Anglia).

Purril's Almshouses date from the 15th century, although rebuilt in 1728, and are Grade II listed.

Year	Population
1801	362
1811	335
1821	406
1831	500
1841	539
1851	603
1881	542
1891	488
1901	475
1911	440
1921	498
1931	524
1941	N/A (World War II)
1951	547
1961	555
2001	569
2011	580
