= Berry Cross =

Hamlet in Devon, England

Coordinates: 50.90°N 04.17°W

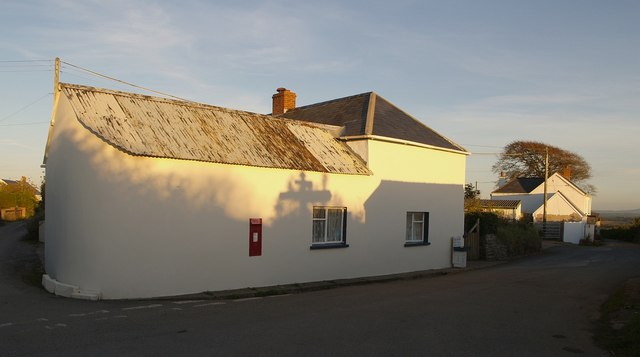
- Berry Cross

- Location within Devon
- OS grid reference: SS4714
- Shire county: Devon
- Region: South West
- Country: England
- Sovereign state: United Kingdom
- Police: Devon and Cornwall
- Fire: Devon and Somerset
- Ambulance: South Western

Berry Cross is a hamlet in Devon, England.
