= River Blyth, Northumberland =

River in Northumberland, England

River Blyth
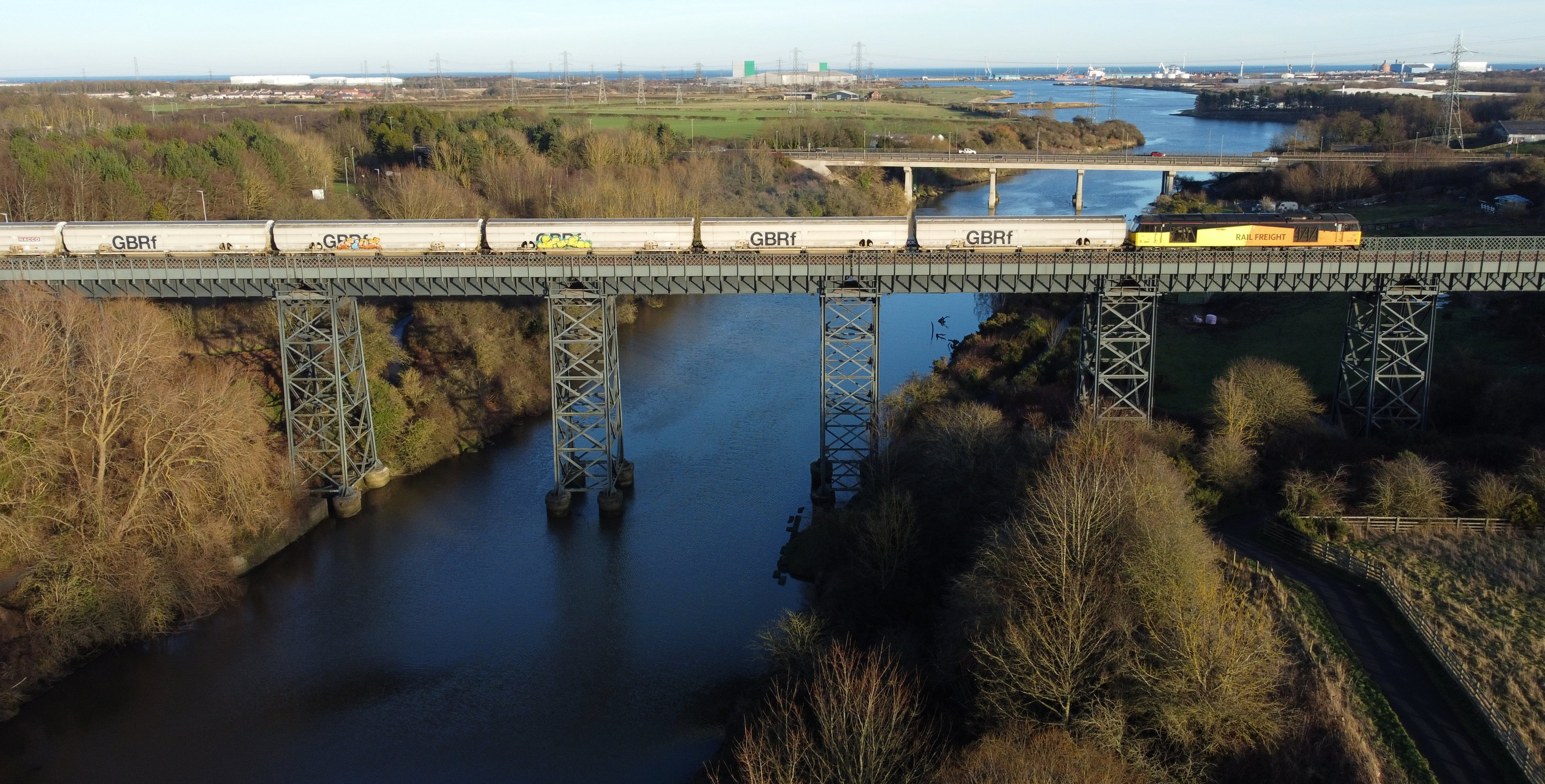
- River Blyth near Bedlington

- Location within Northumberland

Location
- Country: United Kingdom
- County: Northumberland

Physical characteristics
- Source
  - location: Kirkheaton, Northumberland, England
  - elevation: 215 m (705 ft)
- Mouth
  - location: Blyth
  - coordinates: 55.1165°N 1.4891°W
- Length: 44 km (27 mi)
- Discharge
  - location: Hartford Bridge, Northumberland
  - average: 2.14 m^{3}/s (76 cu ft/s)

The River Blyth (/ˈblaɪð/ BLYDHE) flows eastwards through southern Northumberland into the North Sea at the town of Blyth. It flows through Plessey Woods Country Park. The River Pont is a tributary. The Blyth is 27 miles (44 km) long and the Pont is 17 miles (28 km).

The tidal limit of the river is at Bebside. The estuary widens from this point eastwards and with the addition of a burn that enters on the northern side (Sleek Burn), it covers an area of 415 acres (168 hectares).

Ecologists have suggested that a dam on the river at Humford Country Park in Bedlington could be removed to allow for fish migration. The local community have expressed a desire to keep the dam as it is a local beauty spot; they have suggested that a fish passage be built alongside instead.
