= Berrow's Worcester Journal =

Newspaper based in Worcester, England

- The world's oldest newspaper: Established 1690
- Berrow's Worcester Journal Header
- Type: Weekly Freesheet Newspaper (Thursday)
- Format: Tabloid
- Owner(s): Newsquest Media Group; Subsidiary of Gannett
- Editor: Stephanie Preece
- Founded: 1690; 336 years ago
- Headquarters: Berrow's House; Hylton Road; Worcester; WR2 5JX.
- City: Worcester
- Country: England
- Circulation: 6,186 (as of 2023)
- Sister newspapers: Worcester News
- OCLC number: 31683341
- Website: berrowsjournal.co.uk

Berrow's Worcester Journal is a weekly freesheet tabloid newspaper, based in Worcester, England. Owned by Newsquest, the newspaper is delivered across central and southern Worcestershire.

== History ==
=== 16th century printing press ===
Worcester was one of the earliest locations in Britain to have a printing press where its first press was established in 1548 and set up by John Oswin who printed several books on it between 1548 and 1553.

=== Stephen Bryan ===
The first established records of a Worcester newspaper date from 1690 when Stephen Bryan founded the Worcester Post-Man, which has been published ever since, although its name changed to the Worcester Journal and then to the current name Berrow's Worcester Journal, thus laying claim to being the oldest newspaper in the world in continuous and current production.

Local news was relatively rare in the first decade of publication and it was published irregularly from 1690 until 1709, the period following the deposing of James II (& VII) after the Glorious Revolution of 1688 which had seen the beginning of a free press in the country. After about 1720 Bryan began to include more local items. In the time that Bryan owned the paper it was published on Fridays.

=== Berrow family ===
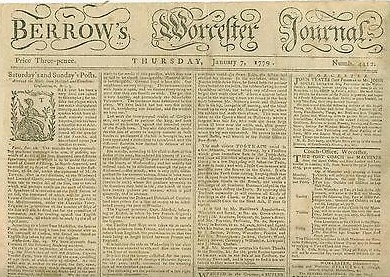
Front page of Berrow's Worcester Journal dated 7 January 1779

In April 1748, Bryan sold the paper to Harvey Berrow who changed its name to The Worcester Journal and its publication day to Thursday.

From 11 October 1753 the paper was published as Berrow's Worcester Journal.

This final name change was prompted when a competitor, Richard Lewis, tried to profit from the success of the Worcester Journal by launching the similar-sounding New Worcester Journal. Lewis's other efforts to take market share from the older paper included publishing on Wednesdays (the day before Berrow) and circulating a report in Bewdley, Kidderminster and Stourbridge that Berrow's newsmen had left his service.

Berrow was the third son of Capel Berrow (died 1751), a clergyman, and younger brother of Capel Berrow the writer, and was an apothecary in Peterborough. This was not unusual during this time as early newspaper proprietors would sell medicines alongside their newspapers. Berrow promoted in his paper his elixir for dropsy and his powder for gout. The paper was sold for 2½d every week with five pages.

Harvey Berrow carried on the Journal until his death on 16 August 1776, when his eldest son, also Harvey Berrow, continued the publication until his death in the following year, on 11 June 1777. The newspaper's ownership was succeeded by his sister, Elizabeth Berrow, whose name appeared upon the Journal until 23 December 1779, after which her name is superseded by that of John Tymbs, to whom she was married on 23 September 1779.

=== Present era ===
In 1982 Berrow's Worcester Journal was taken over by Reed International. The style of the newspaper changed on 26 June 1987 when it became a free newspaper. Newsquest subsequently acquired the Reed newspapers and is the current parent of Berrow's Worcester Journal.

In 1990, the newspaper celebrated its tercentenary (1690–1990) and to mark the occasion, specially commissioned china was produced by Royal Worcester Porcelain at its nearby city factory.

Although the Berrow family have long ceased to have any connection with the paper, their name has perpetuated and the paper continues to be published weekly. Alongside free doorstep delivery, the newspaper is accessible as a free and unsubscribed online edition.

As of December 2023, Berrow's Worcester Journal is one of a number of Newsquest's newspapers using AI-assisted journalism.
