= Berry Down Cross =

Village in Devon, England

Coordinates: 51.1753°N 4.0446°W

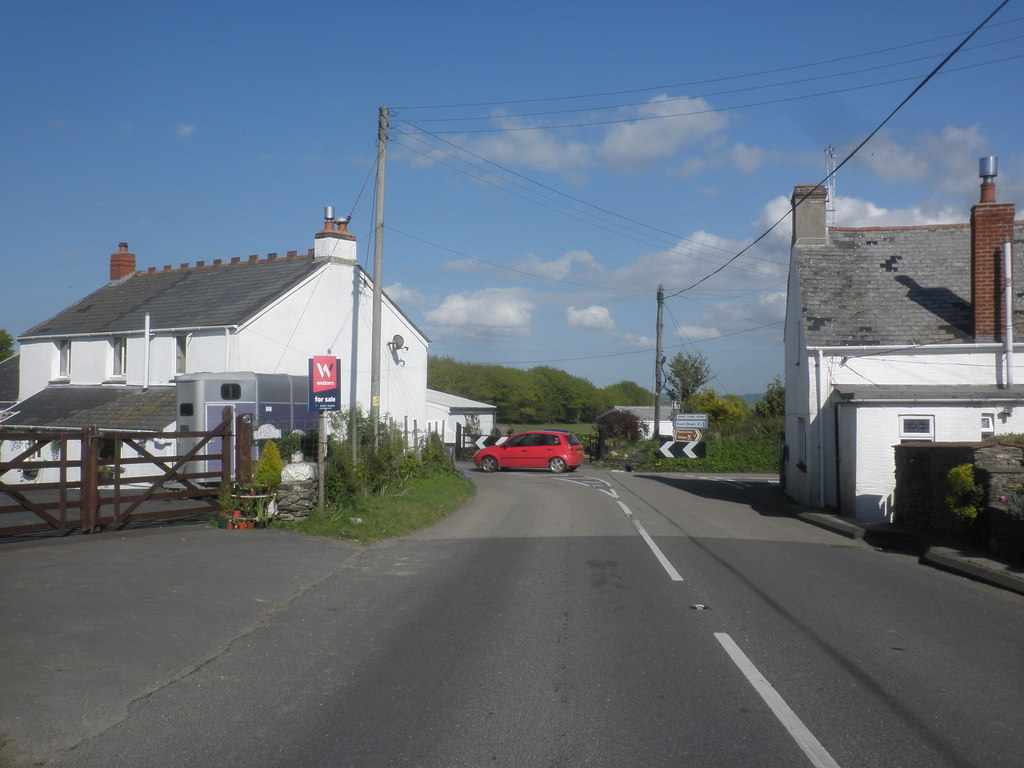
- Berry Down Cross

- Location within Devon
- OS grid reference: SS5743
- Shire county: Devon
- Region: South West
- Country: England
- Sovereign state: United Kingdom
- Police: Devon and Cornwall
- Fire: Devon and Somerset
- Ambulance: South Western

Berry Down Cross is a village in Devon, England. The village has two Bronze Age round barrows located within it and both are listed as scheduled monuments by Historic England.

== Junction ==
Berry Down Cross is infamous for its A3123 road junction, which gained a reputation for being unsafe. A house that had stood on the bend of the junction since the 1700s was crashed into by cars seventeen times over three years. In 2020, the Department for Transport announced a £2.2 million scheme to improve the safety of the road including a 40 mph (64 km/h) speed limit and cat's eyes.
