= Plessey Woods Country Park =

Country park in Northumberland, England

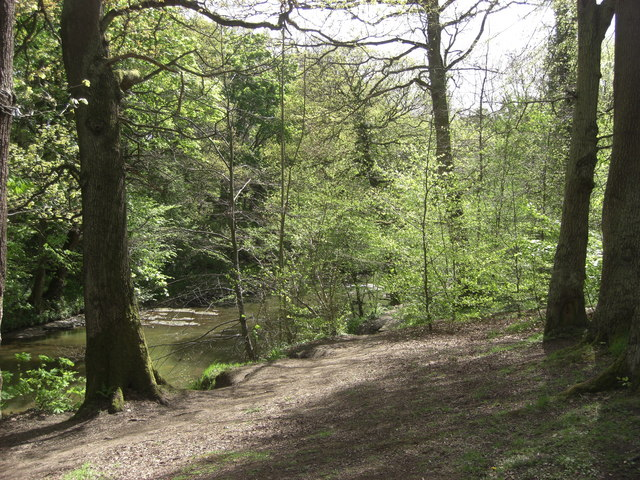

- Location within Northumberland
- OS grid: NZ239799
- Coordinates: 55.114°N 1.626°W
- Camp sites: No
- Parking: Pay-and-display on-site parking

Plessey Woods is a country park situated on the north bank of the River Blyth, in Northumberland. The park is accessed from the A192 in the village of Hartford Bridge, north of Cramlington and south west of Bedlington.

In 2016 charity Leading Link opened a youth-run Art Trail around Plessey Woods. Around the trail there are wooden owls and painted snakes, including hobbit doors in the trees near the river bank.

The park extends over 100 acres (0.40 km^{2}) of woodland, meadows and riverside, with a 1½ mile route circumnavigating these habitats and many smaller routes from this loop.

Free parking (for up to an hour) is available on site, as is a visitor centre with toilets and shop.
