= Bentley Common =

Coordinates: 52.56°N 01.58°W

- Location within Warwickshire
- OS grid reference: SP2896
- Shire county: Warwickshire
- Region: West Midlands
- Country: England
- Sovereign state: United Kingdom
- Post town: Atherstone
- Postcode district: CV9
- Police: Warwickshire
- Fire: Warwickshire
- Ambulance: West Midlands

Bentley Common is a village in Warwickshire, England. For population details see Merevale.
