= Bentlawnt =

Village in Shropshire, England

Coordinates: 52.605°N 2.987°W

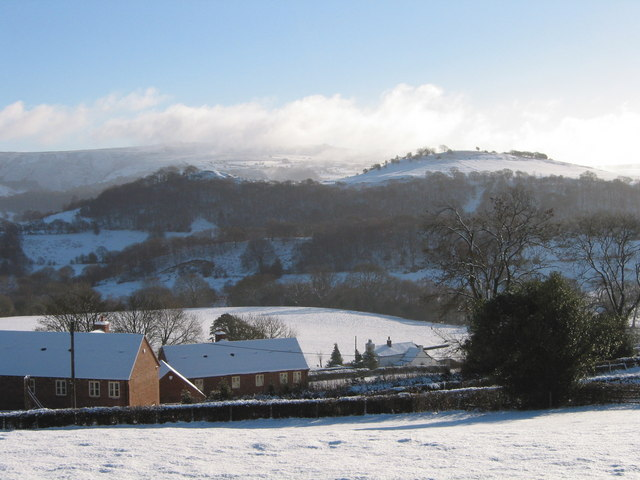
- Bentlawnt, with Stiperstones in the distance

- Location within Shropshire
- OS grid reference: SJ331012
- Civil parish: Worthen with Shelve
- Unitary authority: Shropshire
- Ceremonial county: Shropshire
- Region: West Midlands
- Country: England
- Sovereign state: United Kingdom
- Post town: SHREWSBURY
- Postcode district: SY5
- Dialling code: 01743
- Police: West Mercia
- Fire: Shropshire
- Ambulance: West Midlands
- UK Parliament: Ludlow

Bentlawnt is a village in Shropshire, England.
