= Betley Common =

Area of rural land in Staffordshire, England

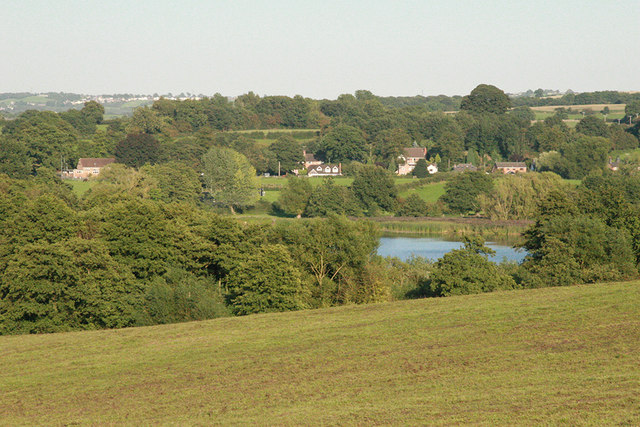
Betley Mere

Betley Common is an area of rural land adjacent to the village of Betley in Staffordshire, England.

The first mention of Betley Common in history is in Whites history 1851. Which states 'in 1717 the benefice was augmented with 20 acres of common land, given by Lord Powlett and others, and with £200 of Queen Anne's Bounty.' Lord William Powlett was an English MP. He served as Member of Parliament for Winchester from 1689 to 1710, for Lymington from 1710 to 1715 and for Winchester from 1715 until his death in 1729. His 2nd marriage was to Anne Egerton daughter of Major General Randolph Egerton who lived in Betley, thereby presumably his connection to Betley village. In 1797 an order recorded 'housing of the impotent poor on the Common' In those days 'Impotent' meant those who were unable to sustain themselves, i.e. the old, weak & unemployed. These developed into small farms, originally predominantly arable land but with the advent of the enclosure act these soon became traditional livestock holdings. Today the Common is accessed by an unadopted road and has many pleasant footpaths and green lanes. The West Coast Main Line railway runs between London and Glasgow to the west of the Common.

Betley Mere is a nearby Site of Special Scientific Interest, managed by Natural England it is the habitat of several rare and important fauna & flora. The underlying Triassic mudstones carry a mantle of glacial drift which has given rise to neutral or acidic stagnogleys with pockets of sandy soils. The result is a pleasant valley with habitats for much diverse wildlife.
