= Berepper =

Village in Cornwall, England

Coordinates: 50.061°N 05.270°W

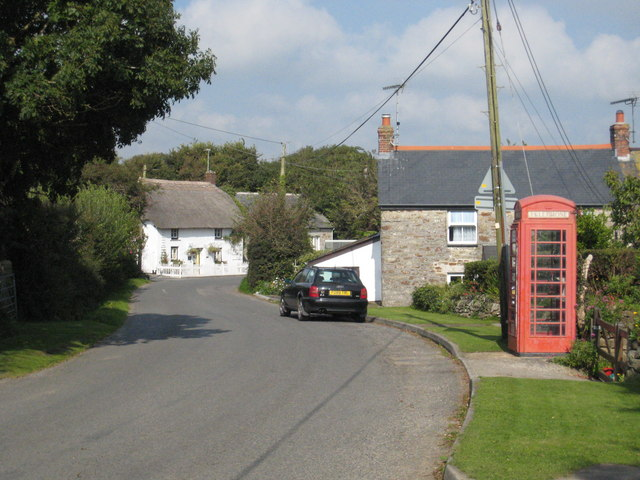

- Location within Cornwall
- OS grid reference: SW6522
- Civil parish: Gunwalloe
- Shire county: Cornwall
- Region: South West
- Country: England
- Sovereign state: United Kingdom
- Post town: Helston
- Postcode district: TR12 7
- Police: Devon and Cornwall
- Fire: Cornwall
- Ambulance: South Western

Berepper is a coastal village in south Cornwall, England, United Kingdom. It is situated on the west side of the Lizard peninsula four miles (6 km) south of Helston, near Gunwalloe. Unusually for Cornish names it derives from Norman French - 'beau-repaire', literally meaning 'beautiful retreat'. The Cornish name for it, 'Argelteg', is a literal translation meaning 'Pretty retreat'. It was Beauripper in 1476, Beaurepper in 1453, and Beureper in 1327 - all Anglo-Norman.

Berepper lies within the Cornwall Area of Outstanding Natural Beauty (AONB). Almost a third of Cornwall has AONB designation, with the same status and protection as a National Park.

== Cornish wrestling ==
Berepper held Cornsih wrestling tournaments for prizes in the 1800s.
