= Best Beech Hill =

Village in East Sussex, England

Coordinates: 51.066667°N 0.3°E

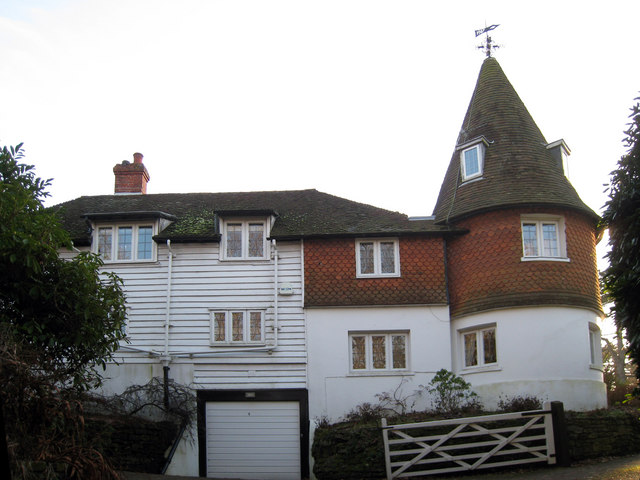
- An oast house in Best Beech Hill

- Location within East Sussex
- OS grid reference: TQ6125132220
- District: Wealden
- Shire county: East Sussex
- Region: South East
- Country: England
- Sovereign state: United Kingdom
- Post town: WADHURST
- Postcode district: TN5
- Dialling code: 01892
- Police: Sussex
- Fire: East Sussex
- Ambulance: South East Coast
- UK Parliament: Wealden

Best Beech Hill is a village in the civil parish of Wadhurst in the Wealden district of East Sussex, England. Wadhurst lies approximately 1.6 miles (2.6 km) north-east on the B2100 road.
