= Berrow, Worcestershire =

Village in Worcestershire, England

Coordinates: 52.00644°N 2.30094°W

Berrow
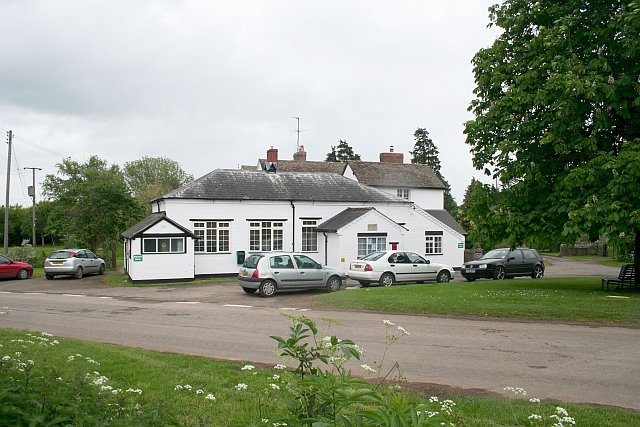
- Berrow Village Hall

- Location within Worcestershire
- Population: 334
- OS grid reference: SO794342
  - London: 100 miles (160 km)
- Civil parish: Berrow
- District: Malvern Hills
- Shire county: Worcestershire
- Region: West Midlands
- Country: England
- Sovereign state: United Kingdom
- Post town: MALVERN
- Postcode district: WR13
- Dialling code: 01684
- Police: West Mercia
- Fire: Hereford and Worcester
- Ambulance: West Midlands
- UK Parliament: West Worcestershire

Berrow is a village and civil parish in the Malvern Hills district of Worcestershire, England, about seven miles east of Ledbury. According to the 2021 census it had a population of 334.

== Parish Church ==
The parish church is dedicated to Saint Faith and is notable for a plaque regarding a gruesome murder that occurred in the parish in the 18th century.

== History ==
=== Name ===
The name Berrow derives from the Old English berg meaning 'hill/tumulus'.

=== The Berrow Murder ===
On the night of Saturday 6th or early morning of Sunday 7 May 1780 Edward Gummery, his wife Elizabeth and their daughter Anne, aged 9, and a visiting brother-in-law of Elizabeth's, Thomas Sheen, were murdered in their home in Berrow. The perpetrators were never found.

Reports at the inquest suggested that the murderers were disturbed by a visitor, a man called Player, at 4am. Player, having knocked, called out but received no answer. Concerned he raised his wife and having returned together found the front door now open. Having discovered corpses they raised the alarm.

Villagers began a search and detained six "tramps" and two of these were later charged with the destruction of enclosure fences at Malvern Link but were not charged with the murders.

In 1809, James Taynton, an octogenarian road labourer from Malvern Link was admitted to Worcester Royal Infirmary with a fractured leg. In his delirium he said a number of things which prompted further investigation and it was later ascertained that he was employed on the Malvern Link enclosures. The Berrow's Worcester Journal reported that he admitted to having been involved with the destruction of the Malvern Link enclosure. He was pressed by patients as to whether he knew anything of the Berrow Murder and reportedly said that the murderers were all alive and as old as himself. After further inquiry from a nurse it was suggested that he had been more directly involved. He later said that the murders had been committed using bills. He died shortly afterwards and no official investigation was made into his involvement.
