= Benington Sea End =

Hamlet in the Benington civil parish of the Borough of Boston in Lincolnshire, England

Coordinates: 52.9925°N 0.0979113°E

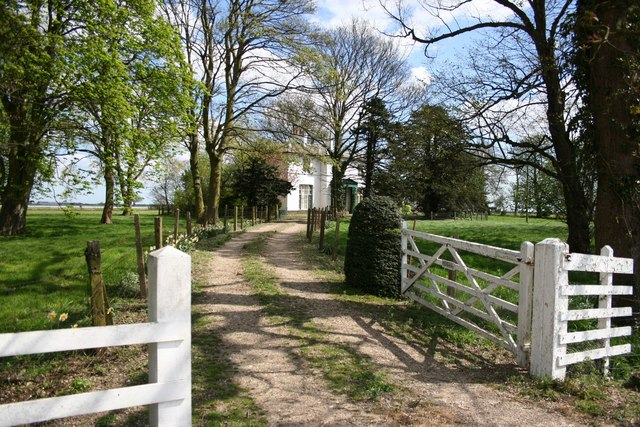
- The Old Rectory, Benington Sea End

- Location within Lincolnshire
- Population: 1,563
- OS grid reference: TF409459
  - London: 105 mi (169 km) S
- Civil parish: Benington
- District: Boston (borough)
- Shire county: Lincolnshire
- Region: East Midlands
- Country: England
- Sovereign state: United Kingdom
- Post town: Boston
- Postcode district: PE22
- Dialling code: 01205
- Police: Lincolnshire
- Fire: Lincolnshire
- Ambulance: East Midlands
- UK Parliament: Boston and Skegness (UK Parliament constituency)

Benington Sea End is a hamlet in the Benington civil parish of the Borough of Boston in Lincolnshire, England. It is 5 miles (8 km) east-northeast from Boston and 30 miles (48 km) south-east from the city and county town of Lincoln.

Benington Sea End is less than 1 mile (1.6 km) south-east from parish village of Bennington and the A52 road, which locally runs from Boston to Skegness. It is centred on the junction between Churchway, Sea End Road, and Spicer's Lane, and includes Sea End Lane and the circuitous Lamb Lane at the south-east. The hamlet is 1 mile north-east from the north-east bank of The Wash. At the east of the hamlet is a sea defence bank, at the south-west of which rises the Delph drain which runs along the landward side. A Second World War pillbox, an Historic England listed monument, sits on the bank just south from where it is crossed by Sea Lane.

The hamlet comprises cottages, four farms, and at the junction of Churchway and Spicer's Lane, The Old Rectory, which is a Grade II listed two-storey, hip roofed former rectory dating to 1830, described in the 1872 White's Directory as "a good residence, with pleasant grounds, near the sea coast". The rectory in the early 20th century was being rented out by the Church of England, and was later sold by them in 1924. The last rector of Benington to live there was Canon Walter Fallows Hodge (1878 - 1938).

Trade directories recorded late 19th and early 20th century agricultural production as of chiefly wheat and potatoes, and by 1919, celery. In 1872 there were listed seven farmers, and two fishermen of the same family; by 1885, five farmers; by 1905 four farmers, two of whom were of the same family, and one also a bulb merchant; and by 1919, a cottage farmer, a smallholder, and five farmers, one of whom was also listed as a potato grower.
