= Bentfield Bury =

Village in Essex, England

Coordinates: 51.90°N 00.16°E

- Location within Essex
- OS grid reference: TL4925
- Shire county: Essex
- Region: East
- Country: England
- Sovereign state: United Kingdom
- Police: Essex
- Fire: Essex
- Ambulance: East of England

Bentfield Bury is a small village in Essex, England. It is one of over 100 villages in the district of Uttlesford and is within Stansted Mountfitchet parish. Nearby towns include Saffron Walden and Bishop's Stortford.

Bentfield Bury is mentioned in the Domesday Book as one of the settlements in Clavering hundred.
