= Berrow Green =

Village in Worcestershire, England

Coordinates: 52.219755°N 2.371459°W

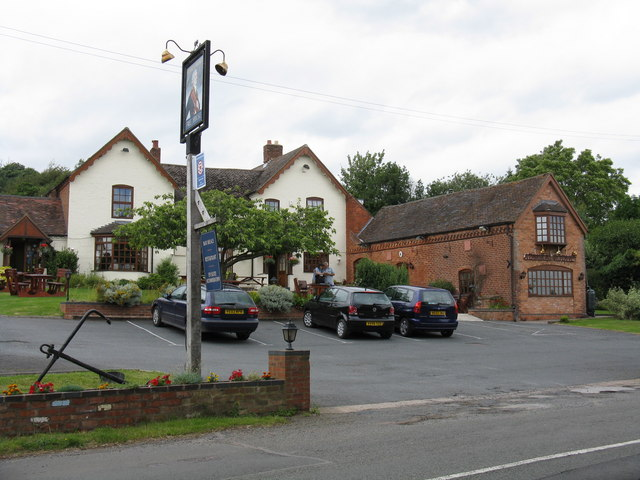
- Admiral Rodney public house

- Location within Worcestershire
- OS grid reference: SO747582
  - London: 109 miles (175 km)
- Civil parish: Martley
- District: Malvern Hills
- Shire county: Worcestershire
- Region: West Midlands
- Country: England
- Sovereign state: United Kingdom
- Post town: WORCESTER
- Postcode district: WR6
- Dialling code: 01886
- Police: West Mercia
- Fire: Hereford and Worcester
- Ambulance: West Midlands

Berrow Green is a village in Worcestershire, England. It lies within the civil parish of Martley, which in 2021 had a population of 1,386.

== Berrow Hill Camp ==
Berrow Green is situated just below Berrow Hill Camp, an Iron Age encampment or fort.

== Sources ==
- Historic England (2015). "Berrow Hill Camp (1005332)". National Heritage List for England.
- Bowen, AR (1952). "The Hill-Forts of Worcestershire and its Borders". Transactions of the Worcestershire Archaeological Society. New Series. XXIX: 33–37.
