= Berrington (1783 EIC ship) =

History

Great Britain
- Name: Berrington
- Owner: EIC voyages #1–5:Donald Cameron; EIC voyage #6:Thomas Newte; 1799:Princep & Saunders
- Builder: Perry & Hankey, Blackwall, or Randall
- Launched: 9 September 1783
- Fate: Last listed in 1807

General characteristics
- Tons burthen: 755, or 810, or 816, or 81680/94 (bm)
- Length: Overall:144 ft 6 in (44.0 m); Keel:117 ft 0 in (35.7 m)
- Beam: 36 ft 2 3/4 in (11.0 m)
- Depth of hold: 14 ft 9 3/4 in (4.5 m)
- Complement: 1795:100; 1799:70; 1800:60
- Armament: 1795:26 × 12&6-pounder guns + 6 swivel guns; 1799:26 × 12&6-pounder guns; 1800:20 × 12-pounder guns

Berrington was launched in 1783. She made six voyages as an East Indiaman for the British East India Company (EIC). She then became a West Indiaman before again making a voyage under the auspices of the EIC to bring rice from Bengal to England for the British government. She returned to Indian waters and was last listed in 1807.

== Career ==
=== EIC voyage #1 (1784–1785) ===
Captain John Johnson sailed from the Downs on 2 February 1784, bound for Madras and Bengal. Berrington reached Johanna on 12 May and Madras on 11 June. She arrived at Kedgeree on 3 July. Homeward bound she was at Saugor on 22 January 1785, reached St Helena on 15 April, and arrived at Blackwall on 23 June.

=== EIC voyage #2 (1786–1787) ===
Captain Thomas Ley sailed from the Downs on 4 March 1786, bound for Madras and Bengal. Berrington reached Madras on 28 June and arrived at Diamond Harbour on 7 July. Homeward bound she was at Saugor on 29 January 1787, Madras on 12 February, and the Cape of Good Hope on 16 May. She reached St Helena on 21 July and arrived at Long Reach on 19 August.

=== EIC voyage #3 (1789–1790) ===
Captain Ley sailed from the Downs on 23 March 1789, bound for Madras and Bengal. Berrington reached Madras on 29 June and arrived at Diamond Harbour on 15 July. Homeward bound, she was at Saugor on 9 January 1790 and Balasore on 23 February. She reached St Helena on 23 May and arrived at Long Reach on 25 July.

=== EIC voyage #4 (1793–1794) ===
Captain Ley sailed from Portsmouth on 5 April 1793, bound for Madras and Bengal. Berrington reached Madras on 15 Aug and arrived at Diamond Harbour on 6 September. Homeward bound, she was at Cox's Island on 7 November. She reached St Helena on 11 February 1794 and arrived at Long Reach on 2 May.

=== EIC voyage #5 (1795–1797) ===
Captain George Robertson acquired a letter of marque on 25 May 1795. He sailed from Portsmouth on 9 July, bound for Madras and Bengal. Berrington was at Santa Cruz on 7 September and reached Madras on 15 December. She visited Tranquebar on 22 December, before returning to Madras on 8 January 1796. She then sailed to Bengal, arriving at Kedgeree on 25 February. She was at Saugor on 18 May, back at Madras on 22 June, and back at Calcutta on 22 August.

Homeward bound, Berrington was at Saugor on 4 January 1797. She was at Colombo on 2 February and Trincomalee on 25 March. She reached the Cape on 12 July and St Helena on 11 September, and arrived at Long Reach on 20 December.

=== EIC voyage #5 (1798–1799) ===
Captain Robertson sailed from Portsmouth on 8 June 1798, bound for Madras and Bengal. Berrington reached Madras on 29 September and arrived at Diamond Harbour on 26 October. Homeward bound, she was at Saugor on 28 December, reached St Helena on 18 May 1799, and arrived at Long Reach on 1 August.

=== General trader ===
In 1799 Prinsep & Co. purchased Berrington. On 21 November 1799 Captain Michael Bonner acquired a letter of marque. The next day Berrington left Gravesend, bound for St Kitts. On 28 June 1800 she arrived back at Gravesend.

Lloyd's Register for 1801 showed Berrington with John Carse, master, Prinsep & Co., owners, and trade London–India.

Messrs. Princip and Saunders tendered her to the EIC to bring back rice from Bengal. She was one of 28 vessels that sailed between December 1800 and February 1801. On 12 December 1800 Captain John Carse acquired a letter of marque. It is not clear when she sailed or when she returned.

On 21 January 1801 she was at Deal, intending to sail again to India. In August 1801 she was London-bound from Bengal, but put into Madras where she was condemned. Apparently she was repaired and continued trading.

== Fate ==
On 5 May 1803 Berrington, King, master, arrived at Bombay from Batavia. Lloyd's Register continued to list her for a few more years, but with stale data and not having been surveyed since 1800.
