= Bentfield Green =

Common land in Essex, England

Coordinates: 51.90°N 00.17°E

- Location within Essex
- OS grid reference: TL5025
- Civil parish: Stansted Mountfitchet
- District: Uttlesford
- Shire county: Essex
- Region: East
- Country: England
- Sovereign state: United Kingdom
- Police: Essex
- Fire: Essex
- Ambulance: East of England

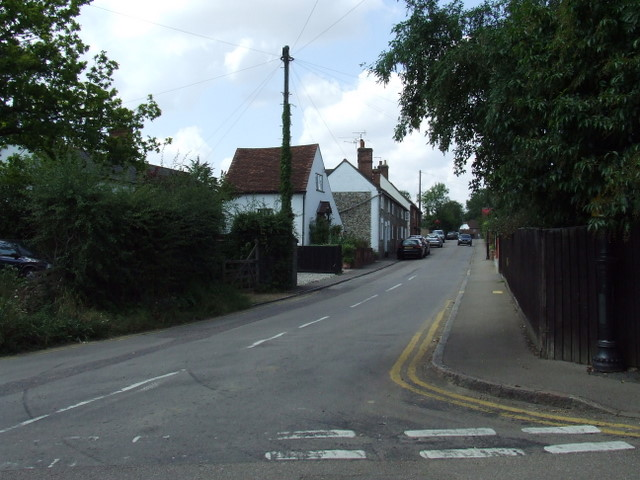
Bentfield End Causeway viewed from Bentfield Road.

Bentfield Green is an area of common land and settlement in the village of Stansted Mountfitchet, in the civil parish of Stansted Mountfitchet, in the Uttlesford district, in the county of Essex, England.
