= Capel Berrow =

- Born: 1716
- Died: 5 October 1782 (aged 65–66)
- Occupation: English Christian minister

Capel Berrow (1716–1782), was an English divine.

== Biography ==
He was born in 1716, son of Capel Berrow; (of Christ's College, Cambridge, B.A. 1703, M.A. 1712), chaplain to William, Earl Cowper, and for forty years the curate of Northill, Bedfordshire, who died 28 Oct. 1761 (Lysons, Bedfordshire, 120). He was admitted into Merchant Taylors' School 16 Oct. 1728, and became head scholar in 1733 (Robinson; M. T. School Register). He proceeded to the university of Oxford, matriculated a commoner of St. John's College 7 Sept. 1734, proceeded B.A. 1 June 1738, M.A. of Christ's College, Cambridge, 1758.

He became curate of St. Botolph's, Aldersgate, March 1741, and afterwards of St. Austin's, and on 12 July 1744 was chosen lecturer of St Benedict's, Paul's Wharf.

== Work ==
The title-pages of his different books show his further offices and dignities, as follows: 'Theological Dissertations by Capel Berrow, A.M. Rector of Rossington, Northamptonshire; Lecturer of St. Bennet's and St. Peter Paul's Wharf, and Chaplain to the Honourable Society of Judges and Serjeants in Serjeants' Inn,' 1782. This work was simply a binding-up together on his death of the unsold copies of his separately issued writings:

1. 'Remarks on the Rt. Rev. Dr. Sherlock's Discourses on the Use and Intent of Prophecy: in a Letter formerly sent to his Lordship.'
2. 'On Predestination, Election, Reprobation, and Future Punishments.'
3. 'A few Extracts from a Discourse concerning Origen and the Chiefest of his Opinions; first printed in the year 1661.'
4. 'Observations on the End and Design of Christ's Death.'
5. 'Deism not consistent with the Religion of Reason and Nature.'
6. 'A Lapse of Human Souls in a State of Pre-existence, the only Original Sin and the Ground Work of the Gospel Dispensation.'

Among the subscribers to the collective volume stands 'Samuel Johnson,' who in the ' Rambler ' had discussed Berrow's speculations. The last, originally published in 1766, is his only book now remembered. Various occasional sermons (1746 onward) were also published by him. He died on 5 October 1782.
