= Berwick Hill =

Village in Northumberland, England

Coordinates: 55.074°N 1.727°W

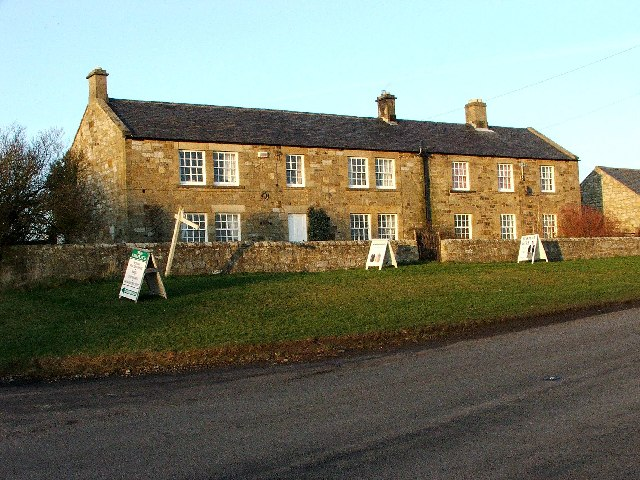

- Location within Northumberland
- OS grid reference: NZ175755
- Civil parish: Ponteland
- Unitary authority: Northumberland
- Ceremonial county: Northumberland
- Region: North East
- Country: England
- Sovereign state: United Kingdom
- Post town: NEWCASTLE UPON TYNE
- Postcode district: NE20
- Police: Northumbria
- Fire: Northumberland
- Ambulance: North East
- UK Parliament: Hexham

Berwick Hill is a village and former civil parish, now in the parish of Ponteland, in the county of Northumberland, England. It is situated to the north of Newcastle upon Tyne, near Ponteland. In 1951 the parish had a population of 41.

== Governance ==
Berwick Hill is in the parliamentary constituency of Hexham. Berwick Hill was formerly a township in Ponteland parish, from 1866 Berwick Hill was a civil parish in its own right until it was abolished on 1 April 1955 and merged with Ponteland.
