= Malvern Hills District Council elections =

Local government elections in Worcestershire, England

Malvern Hills District Council elections are held every four years. Malvern Hills District Council is the local authority for the non-metropolitan district of Malvern Hills in Worcestershire, England. Since the last boundary changes in 2023, 31 councillors have been elected from 18 wards.

== Council elections ==
- 1973 Malvern Hills District Council election
- 1976 Malvern Hills District Council election
- 1979 Malvern Hills District Council election (New ward boundaries)
- 1983 Malvern Hills District Council election
- 1987 Malvern Hills District Council election (District boundary changes took place but the number of seats remained the same)
- 1991 Malvern Hills District Council election
- 1995 Malvern Hills District Council election
- 1997 Malvern Hills District Council election (Elections to shadow authority on new boundaries, councillors took office on 1 April 1998)
- 2000 Malvern Hills District Council election
- 2003 Malvern Hills District Council election (New ward boundaries reduced the number of seats by 4)
- 2007 Malvern Hills District Council election
- 2011 Malvern Hills District Council election
- 2015 Malvern Hills District Council election
- 2019 Malvern Hills District Council election
- 2023 Malvern Hills District Council election (New ward boundaries reduced the number of seats by 7)

== Results maps ==
2003 results map

2007 results map

2011 results map

2015 results map

2019 results map

2023 results map

== By-election results ==
=== 1995-1997 ===
Kempsey By-Election 12 September 1996
| Party | Candidate | Votes | % | ±% |
|---|---|---|---|---|
| Independent | | 634 | 58.1 | |
| Liberal Democrats | | 458 | 41.9 | |
| Majority | | 176 | 16.2 | |
| Turnout | | 1,092 | 34.6 | |
| Independent gain from Conservative | | Swing | | |

=== 1997-2000 ===
Temeside By-Election 2 July 1998
| Party | Candidate | Votes | % | ±% |
|---|---|---|---|---|
| Independent | | 303 | 47.7 | −16.6 |
| Liberal Democrats | | 213 | 33.5 | −2.2 |
| Green | | 119 | 18.7 | +18.7 |
| Majority | | 90 | 14.2 | |
| Turnout | | 635 | | |
| Independent hold | | Swing | | |

Kempsey By-Election 6 May 1999
| Party | Candidate | Votes | % | ±% |
|---|---|---|---|---|
| Conservative | | 726 | 62.8 | +62.8 |
| Liberal Democrats | | 430 | 37.2 | +18.3 |
| Majority | | 296 | 25.6 | |
| Turnout | | 1,156 | 37.2 | |
| Conservative gain from Independent | | Swing | | |

Upton on Severn By-Election 6 May 1999
| Party | Candidate | Votes | % | ±% |
|---|---|---|---|---|
| Liberal Democrats | | 295 | 38.5 | +16.6 |
| Independent | | 257 | 33.5 | +33.5 |
| Conservative | | 215 | 28.0 | −1.5 |
| Majority | | 38 | 5.0 | |
| Turnout | | 767 | 33.1 | |
| Liberal Democrats gain from Conservative | | Swing | | |

=== 2000-2003 ===
Tenbury Town By-Election 26 October 2000
| Party | Candidate | Votes | % | ±% |
|---|---|---|---|---|
| Liberal Democrats | | 385 | 42.3 | |
| Conservative | | 305 | 33.5 | |
| Independent | | 137 | 15.0 | |
| Green | | 84 | 9.2 | |
| Majority | | 80 | 8.8 | |
| Turnout | | 911 | 38.0 | |
| Liberal Democrats gain from Conservative | | Swing | | |

West Malvern By-Election 8 February 2001
| Party | Candidate | Votes | % | ±% |
|---|---|---|---|---|
| Liberal Democrats | | 363 | 51.1 | +2.2 |
| Conservative | | 347 | 48.9 | +48.9 |
| Majority | | 16 | 2.2 | |
| Turnout | | 710 | 26.6 | |
| Liberal Democrats hold | | Swing | | |

Trinity By-Election 2 May 2002
| Party | Candidate | Votes | % | ±% |
|---|---|---|---|---|
| Conservative | | 1,125 | 57.3 | +11.0 |
| Liberal Democrats | | 839 | 42.7 | −11.0 |
| Majority | | 286 | 14.6 | |
| Turnout | | 1,964 | | |
| Conservative gain from Liberal Democrats | | Swing | | |

=== 2003-2007 ===
Alfrick & Leigh By-Election 21 October 2004
| Party | Candidate | Votes | % | ±% |
|---|---|---|---|---|
| Liberal Democrats | Sheila Young | 405 | 43.2 | +43.2 |
| Conservative | | 396 | 42.2 | +8.8 |
| Green | | 91 | 9.7 | +9.7 |
| UKIP | | 456 | 4.9 | −7.4 |
| Majority | | 9 | 1.0 | |
| Turnout | | 938 | 33.5 | |
| Liberal Democrats gain from Independent | | Swing | | |

=== 2007-2011 ===
Hallow By-Election 3 September 2009
| Party | Candidate | Votes | % | ±% |
|---|---|---|---|---|
| Liberal Democrats | | 504 | 61.6 | +16.5 |
| Conservative | | 314 | 38.4 | −16.5 |
| Majority | | 190 | 23.2 | |
| Turnout | | 818 | | |
| Liberal Democrats gain from Conservative | | Swing | | |

=== 2011-2015 ===
West By-Election 5 July 2012
| Party | Candidate | Votes | % | ±% |
|---|---|---|---|---|
| Green | Julian Roskams | 490 | 44.2 | −4.6 |
| Conservative | Jennie Kelly | 329 | 29.7 | −11.1 |
| Independent | Sarah Rouse | 130 | 11.7 | +11.7 |
| UKIP | Mike Savage | 91 | 8.2 | −2.3 |
| Labour | Christopher Burrows | 68 | 6.1 | +6.1 |
| Majority | | 161 | 14.5 | |
| Turnout | | 1,108 | | |
| Green hold | | Swing | | |

Chase By-Election 2 May 2013
| Party | Candidate | Votes | % | ±% |
|---|---|---|---|---|
| Conservative | Melanie Baker | 595 | 33.8 | −9.8 |
| Liberal Democrats | Robert Tilley | 513 | 29.1 | −12.9 |
| UKIP | Jeanette Sheen | 392 | 22.2 | +7.8 |
| Labour | Jill Smith | 262 | 14.9 | +14.9 |
| Majority | | 82 | 4.7 | |
| Turnout | | 1,762 | | |
| Conservative gain from Liberal Democrats | | Swing | | |

Lindridge By-Election 22 May 2014
| Party | Candidate | Votes | % | ±% |
|---|---|---|---|---|
| Conservative | Chris Dell | 437 | 55.0 | N/A |
| UKIP | Andrew Dolan | 229 | 28.8 | N/A |
| Liberal Democrats | Simon Gill | 128 | 16.1 | N/A |
| Majority | | 208 | 26.2 | |
| Turnout | | 794 | | |
| Conservative hold | | Swing | | |

Wells By-Election 7 August 2014
| Party | Candidate | Votes | % | ±% |
|---|---|---|---|---|
| Conservative | Chris O'Donnell | 317 | 37.3 | −25.3 |
| Liberal Democrats | Simon Gill | 227 | 26.7 | +26.7 |
| UKIP | Richard Spencer | 158 | 18.6 | +18.6 |
| Independent | Louise Gibson | 76 | 9.0 | +9.0 |
| Labour | Christopher Burrows | 71 | 8.4 | +8.4 |
| Majority | | 90 | 10.6 | |
| Turnout | | 849 | | |
| Conservative hold | | Swing | | |

=== 2015-2019 ===
Teme Valley By-Election 3 December 2015
| Party | Candidate | Votes | % | ±% |
|---|---|---|---|---|
| Conservative | Caroline Palethorpe | 268 | 63.8 | −8.5 |
| Labour | Daniel Walton | 96 | 22.9 | +22.9 |
| UKIP | Andrew Dolan | 56 | 13.3 | −14.4 |
| Majority | | 172 | 41.0 | |
| Turnout | | 420 | | |
| Conservative hold | | Swing | | |

West By-Election 4 May 2017
| Party | Candidate | Votes | % | ±% |
|---|---|---|---|---|
| Green | Natalie McVey | 549 | 38.6 | −20.9 |
| Conservative | Henry Clarke | 437 | 30.7 | −9.8 |
| Liberal Democrats | Dee Tomlin | 268 | 18.8 | +18.8 |
| Labour | Andy Gardner | 169 | 11.9 | +11.9 |
| Majority | | 112 | 7.9 | |
| Turnout | | 1,423 | | |
| Green hold | | Swing | | |

=== 2019-2023 ===
Tenbury By-Election 16 September 2021
| Party | Candidate | Votes | % | ±% |
|---|---|---|---|---|
| Independent | Lesley Bruton | 481 | 55.9 | N/A |
| Conservative | Liam Thompson | 269 | 31.3 | N/A |
| Labour | Jonathan Morgan | 78 | 9.1 | N/A |
| Liberal Democrats | Jed Marson | 32 | 3.7 | N/A |
| Majority | | 212 | 24.7 | |
| Turnout | | 860 | | |
| Independent gain from Conservative | | Swing | | |

=== 2023-2027 ===
Tenbury By-Election 30 April 2026
| Party | Candidate | Votes | % | ±% |
|---|---|---|---|---|
| Reform | Duane Hubbard | 687 | 45.1 | |
| Conservative | Carl Fordington | 461 | 30.3 | |
| Liberal Democrats | Jed Marson | 193 | 12.7 | |
| Green | Sam Lewis | 182 | 12.0 | |
| Majority | | 226 | 14.8 | |
| Turnout | | 1,523 | | |
| Reform gain from Conservative | | Swing | | |

Alfrick, Leigh and Rushwick By-Election 21 May 2026
| Party | Candidate | Votes | % | ±% |
|---|---|---|---|---|
| Liberal Democrats | Chris McSweeny | 452 | 25.8 | |
| Conservative | Seb Barbour | 391 | 22.3 | |
| Reform | Max Windsor-Peplow | 340 | 19.4 | |
| Independent | Tom Clarke | 296 | 16.9 | |
| Green | Charlie Anderton | 190 | 10.8 | |
| Independent | Matt Oliver | 83 | 4.7 | |
| Majority | | 61 | 3.5 | |
| Turnout | | 1,752 | | |
| Liberal Democrats gain from MH Independents | | Swing | | |
