= 2019 Malvern Hills District Council election =

2019 UK local government election

- 2 May 2019

All 38 seats to Malvern Hills District Council 20 seats needed for a majority

	First party	Second party	Third party
Party	Conservative	Liberal Democrats	Independent
Last election	23 seats, 43.5%	5 seats, 14.8%	7 seats, 16.6%
Seats won	13	9	10
Seat change	▼10	▲4	▲3
Popular vote	9,950	9,494	7,658
Percentage	28.9%	27.6%	22.2%
Swing	▼14.6%	▲12.8%	▲5.6%
	Fourth party	Fifth party
Party	Green	Labour
Last election	3 seats, 11.5%	0 seats, 6.8%
Seats won	5	1
Seat change	▲2	▲1
Popular vote	3,803	2,380
Percentage	11.0%	6.9%
Swing	▼0.5%	▲0.1%
- Results of the 2019 Malvern Hills District Council election
Council control before election
Conservative
Council control after election
No overall control

The 2019 Malvern Hills District Council election took place on 2 May 2019 to elect members of Malvern Hills District Council in England.

== Summary ==
=== Election result ===
2019 Malvern Hills District Council election
Party	Candidates	Seats	Gains	Losses	Net gain/loss	Seats %	Votes %	Votes	+/−
Conservative	32	13	0	10	▼10	39.5	28.9	9,950	–14.6
Liberal Democrats	27	9	4	0	▲4	23.7	27.6	9,494	+12.8
Independent	14	10	3	0	▲3	21.1	22.2	7,658	+5.6
Green	6	5	2	0	▲2	13.2	11.0	3,803	–0.5
Labour	8	1	1	0	▲1	2.6	6.9	2,380	+0.1
UKIP	7	0	0	0	Steady	0.0	3.4	1,165	–3.3

== Ward results ==
=== Alfrick & Leigh ===
Alfrick & Leigh
Party	Candidate	Votes	%	±%
Independent	Sarah Rouse *	764	63.6	
Independent	Peter Whatley	634	52.7	
Conservative	Karen Hanks	328	27.3	
Liberal Democrats	Niels Emmerson	168	14.0	
UKIP	Mike Savage	156	13.0	
UKIP	Mark Starr	91	7.6	
Majority				
Turnout				
Independent hold		Swing		
Independent hold		Swing		

=== Baldwin ===
Baldwin
Party	Candidate	Votes	%	±%
Conservative	Pam Cumming *	455	77.6	
Liberal Democrats	Danielle Bennett	131	22.4	
Majority				
Turnout				
Conservative hold		Swing		

=== Broadheath ===
Broadheath
Party	Candidate	Votes	%	±%
Independent	Daniel Walton	708	63.3	
Conservative	David Chambers *	419	37.5	
Conservative	Richard Moore	361	32.3	
Liberal Democrats	Jed Marson	252	22.5	
Liberal Democrats	Tom Travers	131	11.7	
Majority				
Turnout				
Independent gain from Conservative		Swing		
Conservative hold		Swing		

=== Chase ===
Chase
Party	Candidate	Votes	%	±%
Conservative	Caroline Baldwin	568	35.7	
Labour	Samantha Charles	548	34.4	
Conservative	James O'Donnell *	541	34.0	
Conservative	Kathy Leather	504	31.6	
Liberal Democrats	Josie Wilkinson	482	30.3	
Labour	Neil Morton	479	30.1	
Liberal Democrats	William Chaundy	478	30.0	
Liberal Democrats	Peter Wilkinson	354	22.2	
UKIP	Jeanette Sheen	214	13.4	
Majority				
Turnout				
Conservative hold		Swing		
Labour gain from Conservative		Swing		
Conservative hold		Swing		

=== Dyson Perrins ===
Dyson Perrins
Party	Candidate	Votes	%	±%
Green	Chris Reed *	645	64.5	
Green	Julie Wood	596	59.6	
Conservative	Tony Baker *	313	31.3	
Liberal Democrats	Amelia Emmerson	121	12.1	
Liberal Democrats	Charlie Emmerson	85	8.5	
Majority				
Turnout				
Green hold		Swing		
Green gain from Conservative		Swing		

=== Hallow ===
Hallow
Party	Candidate	Votes	%	±%
Independent	Dean Clarke *	476	82.8	
Conservative	Paul Selway-Swift	99	17.2	
Majority				
Turnout				
Independent hold		Swing		

=== Kempsey ===
Kempsey
Party	Candidate	Votes	%	±%
Independent	David Harrison *	957	83.2	
Independent	John Michael *	917	79.7	
Conservative	Harry Tanner	133	11.6	
Liberal Democrats	Madeline Slaney	93	8.1	
Liberal Democrats	Elaine Drage	90	7.8	
Majority				
Turnout				
Independent hold		Swing		
Independent hold		Swing		

=== Lindridge ===
Lindridge
Party	Candidate	Votes	%	±%
Conservative	Douglas Godwin	385	68.5	
Liberal Democrats	John Drage	177	31.5	
Majority				
Turnout				
Conservative hold		Swing		

=== Link ===
Link
Party	Candidate	Votes	%	±%
Liberal Democrats	Kwai Hung Chan *	753	44.7	
Liberal Democrats	Neville Mills	638	37.9	
Liberal Democrats	Kaleem Aksar	623	37.0	
Conservative	David Watkins *	439	26.1	
Conservative	Jennie Newman	425	25.3	
Independent	Heather Jeavons	360	21.4	
Conservative	Mo Dutta	318	18.9	
Labour	Martin Willis	307	18.2	
Labour	Christopher Burrows	282	16.8	
UKIP	Malcolm Delingpole	185	11.0	
UKIP	Brian Hill	169	10.0	
Majority				
Turnout				
Liberal Democrats hold		Swing		
Liberal Democrats gain from Conservative		Swing		
Liberal Democrats gain from Conservative		Swing		

=== Longdon ===
Longdon
Party	Candidate	Votes	%	±%
Conservative	Bronwen Behan *	374	62.1	
Liberal Democrats	John Humphreys	228	37.9	
Majority				
Turnout				
Conservative hold		Swing		

=== Martley ===
Martley
Party	Candidate	Votes	%	±%
Conservative	Barbara Williams *	362	72.3	
Independent	Arthur Mountford	139	27.7	
Majority				
Turnout				
Conservative hold		Swing		

=== Morton ===
Morton
Party	Candidate	Votes	%	±%
Independent	Mick Davies *	613	77.1	
Conservative	Neil Baldwin	182	22.9	
Majority				
Turnout				
Independent hold		Swing		

=== Pickersleigh ===
Pickersleigh
Party	Candidate	Votes	%	±%
Liberal Democrats	Caroline Bovey *	571	59.0	
Liberal Democrats	Paul Bennett	423	43.7	
Liberal Democrats	Richard Whitehead	410	42.4	
Conservative	Jane Yardley	272	24.4	
Labour	Lynne Lambeth	271	28.1	
Conservative	Sydney Harrison	265	27.4	
Labour	Lou Lowton	205	21.2	
Majority				
Turnout				
Liberal Democrats hold		Swing		
Liberal Democrats gain from Conservative		Swing		
Liberal Democrats hold		Swing		

=== Powick ===
Powick
Party	Candidate	Votes	%	±%
Liberal Democrats	Tom Wells *	965	68.1	
Liberal Democrats	Kathy Wells	729	51.4	
Independent	Elaine Newman	511	36.0	
UKIP	Dave Barrie	170	12.0	
Conservative	Sylwia Miziula	170	12.0	
Majority				
Turnout				
Liberal Democrats hold		Swing		
Liberal Democrats hold		Swing		

=== Priory ===
Priory
Party	Candidate	Votes	%	±%
Independent	Cynthia Palmer	484	38.5	
Liberal Democrats	Beverley Nielsen	419	33.4	
Conservative	Hannah Campbell *	406	32.3	
Conservative	Roger Hall-Jones *	395	31.4	
Liberal Democrats	Dee Tomlin	367	29.2	
Labour	Josephine Leibrandt	204	16.2	
Majority				
Turnout				
Independent gain from Conservative		Swing		
Liberal Democrats gain from Conservative		Swing		

=== Ripple ===
Ripple
Party	Candidate	Votes	%	±%
Conservative	Jeremy Owenson *	396	71.0	
Green	Anne Burge	162	29.0	
Majority				
Turnout				
Conservative hold		Swing		

=== Teme Valley ===
Teme Valley
Party	Candidate	Votes	%	±%
Conservative	Caroline Palethorpe	Unopposed		
Majority				
Turnout				
Conservative hold		Swing		

=== Tenbury ===
Tenbury
Party	Candidate	Votes	%	±%
Conservative	Tony Penn *	Unopposed		
Conservative	Bridget Thomas	Unopposed		
Majority				
Turnout				
Conservative hold		Swing		
Conservative hold		Swing		

=== Upton & Hanley ===
Upton & Hanley
Party	Candidate	Votes	%	±%
Conservative	Andrea Morgan *	540	48.3	
Green	Martin Allen	467	41.7	
Conservative	Debbie Collings	437	39.1	
Liberal Democrats	Robert Emmerson	290	25.9	
UKIP	Doug Guest	180	16.1	
Majority				
Turnout				
Conservative hold		Swing		
Green gain from Conservative		Swing		

=== Wells ===
Wells
Party	Candidate	Votes	%	±%
Independent	John Gallagher	423	37.9	
Independent	Mark Dyde	356	31.9	
Conservative	Jill Campbell	329	29.5	
Independent	Alison Oliver	316	28.3	
Conservative	Chris O'Donnell *	283	25.4	
Liberal Democrats	Elizabeth Mills	177	15.9	
Liberal Democrats	Ronan Head	149	13.4	
Labour	Daniel Roberts	84	7.5	
Majority				
Turnout				
Independent gain from Conservative		Swing		
Independent hold		Swing		

=== West ===
West
Party	Candidate	Votes	%	±%
Green	John Raine *	998	76.8	
Green	Natalie McVey	935	72.0	
Conservative	Jennie Kelly	251	19.3	
Liberal Democrats	Ben Murphy	190	14.6	
Majority				
Turnout				
Green hold		Swing		
Green hold		Swing		

=== Woodbury ===
Woodbury
Party	Candidate	Votes	%	±%
Conservative	Paul Cumming *	Unopposed		
Conservative hold		Swing		

== Changes 2019–2023 ==
- Kathy Wells and Tom Wells, elected as Liberal Democrat councillors for Powick, and Kwai Hung Chan and Beverley Nielsen, elected as Liberal Democrat councillors for Link and Priory respectively, all left the Liberal Democrat group in February 2021 to sit as independents.
- Caroline Bovey, elected as a Liberal Democrat councillor for Pickersleigh, left the Liberal Democrat group in June 2021 to sit as an independent.

== By-elections ==
=== Tenbury Wells ===
The Tenbury Wells by-election was triggered by the resignation of Conservative councillor Tony Penn, who stood down on age grounds at 87 after 14 years on the council.

Tenbury Wells: 16 September 2021
Party	Candidate	Votes	%	±%
Independent	Lesley Bruton	481	55.9	New
Conservative	Liam Thompson	269	31.3	−68.7
Labour	Jonathan Morgan	78	9.1	New
Liberal Democrats	Jed Marson	32	3.7	New
Majority		212	24.6	N/A
Turnout		862	28.3	N/A
Independent gain from Conservative		Swing		
