= 2015 Malvern Hills District Council election =

2015 UK local government election

Results of the 2015 Malvern Hills District Council election

The 2015 Malvern Hills District Council election took place on 7 May 2015 to elect members of Malvern Hills District Council in England. This was on the same day as the general election for the House of Commons of the United Kingdom and other local elections.

The Conservative Party maintained their control of the council.

== Ward results ==
Alfrick and Leigh
| Party | Candidate | Votes | % | ±% |
|---|---|---|---|---|
| Conservative | Peter Hawkins | 858 | 21.91 | |
| Conservative | David Hughes | 695 | 17.75 | |
| Independent | Sarah Rouse | 992 | 25.33 | |
| UKIP | Mike Savage | 421 | 10.75 | |
| Independent | Anthony Warburton | 950 | 24.26 | |
| Turnout | | 3,916 | 77.86 | |

Baldwin
| Party | Candidate | Votes | % | ±% |
|---|---|---|---|---|
| Conservative | Pam Cumming | N/A | N/A | |
| Turnout | | N/A | N/A | |

Broadheath
| Party | Candidate | Votes | % | ±% |
|---|---|---|---|---|
| Conservative | David Chambers | 1095 | 33.89 | |
| Conservative | Douglas Godwin | 877 | 27.14 | |
| Liberal Democrats | Neville Mills | 535 | 16.56 | |
| Independent | Aubrey Tarbuck | 724 | 22.41 | |
| Turnout | | 3,231 | 75.12 | |

Chase
| Party | Candidate | Votes | % | ±% |
|---|---|---|---|---|
| Conservative | Melanie Baker | 1272 | 14.48 | |
| Green | John Blewitt | 589 | 6.70 | |
| Green | Jan Dyer | 624 | 7.10 | |
| Liberal Democrats | Simon Gill | 799 | 9.09 | |
| Liberal Democrats | Cathy Jackson-Read | 811 | 9.23 | |
| Conservative | Rebecca Massey | 1127 | 12.83 | |
| Conservative | James O'Donnell | 1030 | 11.72 | |
| Liberal Democrats | Jill Smith | 504 | 5.74 | |
| UKIP | Richard Spencer | 714 | 8.13 | |
| Green | Fran Victory | 574 | 6.53 | |
| Liberal Democrats | Josie Wilkinson | 742 | 8.45 | |
| Turnout | | 8,786 | 71.87 | |

Dyson Perrins
| Party | Candidate | Votes | % | ±% |
|---|---|---|---|---|
| Conservative | Tony Baker | 1033 | 29.31 | |
| Green | Chris Reed | 971 | 27.55 | |
| UKIP | Jeanette Sheen | 724 | 20.54 | |
| Independent | Les Williamson | 796 | 22.59 | |
| Turnout | | 3,524 | 68.75 | |

Hallow
| Party | Candidate | Votes | % | ±% |
|---|---|---|---|---|
| Independent | Dean Clarke | 851 | 72.06 | |
| Conservative | Tony O'Donnell | 330 | 27.94 | |
| Turnout | | 1,181 | 78.4 | |

Kempsey
| Party | Candidate | Votes | % | ±% |
|---|---|---|---|---|
| Labour | Christopher Burrows | 268 | 6.54 | |
| Independent | David Harrison | 1398 | 34.14 | |
| Independent | Richard Michael | 1136 | 27.74 | |
| Conservative | Barbara Morgan | 597 | 14.58 | |
| Conservative | Adam Rea | 696 | 17.00 | |
| Turnout | | 4,095 | 74.84 | |

Lindridge
| Party | Candidate | Votes | % | ±% |
|---|---|---|---|---|
| Conservative | Chris Dell | N/A | N/A | |
| Turnout | | N/A | N/A | |

Link
| Party | Candidate | Votes | % | ±% |
|---|---|---|---|---|
| Liberal Democrats | Kwai Hung Chan | 1162 | 14.46 | |
| Labour | John Gallagher | 715 | 8.90 | |
| Conservative | Robert Kerby | 1004 | 12.49 | |
| UKIP | Will Richards | 793 | 9.87 | |
| Independent | Clive Smith | 798 | 9.93 | |
| Independent | Mike Soley | 764 | 9.50 | |
| Conservative | Jerry Thomas | 970 | 12.07 | |
| Conservative | David Watkins | 1095 | 13.62 | |
| Labour | Martin Willis | 737 | 9.17 | |
| Turnout | | 8,038 | 68.82 | |

Longdon
| Party | Candidate | Votes | % | ±% |
|---|---|---|---|---|
| Conservative | Bronwen Jane Behan | 890 | 69.31 | |
| Liberal Democrats | John Humphreys | 394 | 30.69 | |
| Turnout | | 1,284 | 77.34 | |

Martley
| Party | Candidate | Votes | % | ±% |
|---|---|---|---|---|
| Green | Malcolm Gordon Victory | 115 | 10.43 | |
| Labour | Lisa Walton | 220 | 19.95 | |
| Conservative | Barbara Williams | 768 | 69.63 | |
| Turnout | | 1,103 | 78.69 | |

Morton
| Party | Candidate | Votes | % | ±% |
|---|---|---|---|---|
| Independent | Nigel Caldicott | 88 | 6.92 | |
| Conservative | Roger Cousins | 327 | 25.73 | |
| Independent | Mick Davies | 856 | 67.35 | |
| Turnout | | 1,271 | 76.84 | |

Pickersleigh
| Party | Candidate | Votes | % | ±% |
|---|---|---|---|---|
| Liberal Democrats | Caroline Bovey | 766 | 12.93 | |
| Conservative | Leanne Halling | 710 | 11.99 | |
| Conservative | Ian Hopewood | 692 | 11.69 | |
| Labour | Lynne Lambeth | 639 | 10.79 | |
| Conservative | Patrick Terrace Mewton | 595 | 10.05 | |
| Liberal Democrats | Val Myatt | 701 | 11.84 | |
| Liberal Democrats | Brian Pilcher | 593 | 10.01 | |
| UKIP | David Scrimshaw | 600 | 10.13 | |
| Labour | Daniel Walton | 626 | 10.57 | |
| Turnout | | 5,922 | 56.87 | |

Powick
| Party | Candidate | Votes | % | ±% |
|---|---|---|---|---|
| UKIP | David Barrie | 343 | 8.14 | |
| Conservative | Sarah Beard | 711 | 16.87 | |
| Conservative | David Bicknell | 624 | 14.80 | |
| Liberal Democrats | Elaine Newman | 1001 | 23.75 | |
| Liberal Democrats | Tom Wells | 1536 | 36.44 | |
| Turnout | | 4,215 | 77.29 | |

Priory
| Party | Candidate | Votes | % | ±% |
|---|---|---|---|---|
| Conservative | Hannah Campbell | 962 | 23.24 | |
| Liberal Democrats | Will Chaundy | 637 | 15.39 | |
| UKIP | Malcolm Delingpole | 251 | 6.06 | |
| Green | Robert John Dowler | 520 | 12.56 | |
| Conservative | Roger Hall-Jones | 727 | 17.56 | |
| Liberal Democrats | Graham Myatt | 566 | 13.67 | |
| Green | Melinda Platt | 477 | 11.52 | |
| Turnout | | 4,140 | 74.8 | |

Ripple
| Party | Candidate | Votes | % | ±% |
|---|---|---|---|---|
| Conservative | Jeremy Owenson | 589 | 52.40 | |
| Independent | Roger Sutton | 535 | 47.60 | |
| Turnout | | 1,124 | 77.79 | |

Teme Valley
| Party | Candidate | Votes | % | ±% |
|---|---|---|---|---|
| UKIP | Andrew Dolan | 306 | 27.74 | |
| Conservative | Gill Farmer | 797 | 72.26 | |
| Turnout | | 1,103 | 75.76 | |

Tenbury
| Party | Candidate | Votes | % | ±% |
|---|---|---|---|---|
| Conservative | Phil Grove | 1414 | 46.77 | |
| Labour | Jonathan Pryce Morgan | 618 | 20.44 | |
| Conservative | Tony Penn | 991 | 32.78 | |
| Turnout | | 3,023 | 66.07 | |

Upton and Hanley
| Party | Candidate | Votes | % | ±% |
|---|---|---|---|---|
| UKIP | Doug Guest | 491 | 12.41 | |
| Conservative | Andrea Morgan | 1082 | 27.35 | |
| Conservative | Mike Morgan | 980 | 24.77 | |
| Independent | Tim Perry | 744 | 18.81 | |
| Labour | Les Roberts | 358 | 9.05 | |
| Green | Robin Whitebeam | 301 | 7.61 | |
| Turnout | | 3,956 | 78.82 | |

Wells
| Party | Candidate | Votes | % | ±% |
|---|---|---|---|---|
| Conservative | Paul Bennett | 766 | 23.50 | |
| Independent | Jill Campbell | 828 | 25.40 | |
| Conservative | Chris O'Donnell | 885 | 27.15 | |
| Green | Jackie Smethurst | 781 | 23.96 | |
| Turnout | | 3,260 | 76.23 | |

West
| Party | Candidate | Votes | % | ±% |
|---|---|---|---|---|
| Conservative | Jennie Kelly | 968 | 21.60 | |
| Conservative | Harry Lofthouse | 747 | 16.67 | |
| Green | John Raine | 1421 | 31.70 | |
| Green | Julian Roskams | 1346 | 30.03 | |
| Turnout | | 4,482 | 76.3 | |

Woodbury
| Party | Candidate | Votes | % | ±% |
|---|---|---|---|---|
| Conservative | Paul Cumming | 1097 | 82.92 | |
| Green | Steve Main | 226 | 17.08 | |
| Turnout | | 1,323 | 81.43 | |
