= Grade I listed buildings in East Suffolk District =

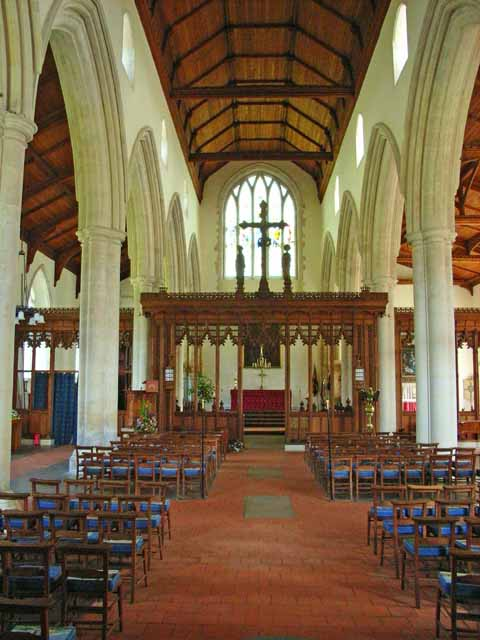
The interior of St Bartholomew's, the parish church of Orford.

There are many Grade I listed buildings in the East Suffolk District, a district formed in 2019 from a merge of Suffolk Coastal and Waveney. There are 60 such buildings from Suffolk Coastal, and 51 from Waveney.

In the United Kingdom, the term listed building refers to a building or other structure officially designated as being of "exceptional architectural or historic special interest"; Grade I structures are those considered to be "buildings of "exceptional interest, sometimes considered to be internationally important. Just 2.5% of listed buildings are Grade I." The total number of listed buildings in England is 372,905. Listing was begun by a provision in the Town and Country Planning Act 1947. Listing a building imposes severe restrictions on what the owner might wish to change or modify in the structure or its fittings. In England, the authority for listing under the Planning (Listed Buildings and Conservation Areas) Act 1990 rests with English Heritage, a non-departmental public body sponsored by the Department for Culture, Media and Sport.

Suffolk Coastal was a local government district with its administrative headquarters at Woodbridge, while the main town in the district is Felixstowe, which is also Britain's busiest container port. Waveney was a local government district with its administrative headquarters at Lowestoft, that was also the main town in the district and the second in Suffolk.

== List ==
Name	Location	Type	Completed (Note: The date given is the date used by Historic England as significant for the initial building or that of an important part in the structure's description.)	Date designated	Grid ref. (Note: The grid reference is based on the British national grid reference system, sometimes known as OSGB36, used by the Ordnance Survey.) Geo-coordinates	Entry number (Note: The "List Entry Number" is a unique number assigned to each listed building and scheduled monument by Historic England.)	Image	Ref.
Moot Hall	Aldeburgh	Market Cross	c. 1520	27 February 1950	TM4655256862; 52°09′18″N 1°36′11″E	1269716	Moot Hall More images	
Church of St John the Baptist	Badingham	Parish Church	13th century	7 December 1966	TM3056468318; 52°15′53″N 1°22′39″E	1030808	Church of St John the Baptist More images	
Holy Trinity Church	Blythburgh	Church	15th century	7 December 1966	TM4507675315; 52°19′16″N 1°35′41″E	1030710	Holy Trinity Church More images	
St Andrews Church	Bramfield	Parish Church	14th century	7 December 1966	TM3989973797; 52°18′35″N 1°31′04″E	1198687	St Andrews Church More images	
Tower of St Andrews Church	Bramfield	Bell Tower	12th century	7 December 1966	TM3988173784; 52°18′35″N 1°31′03″E	1030661	Tower of St Andrews Church More images	
Church of All Saints	Brandeston	Parish Church	14th century	7 December 1966	TM2478960303; 52°11′42″N 1°17′16″E	1030603	Church of All Saints More images	
Church of St Edmund	Bromeswell	Parish Church	15th century	16 March 1966	TM3029050677; 52°06′23″N 1°21′41″E	1030430	Church of St Edmund More images	
Church of St Peter	Bruisyard	Parish Church	13th century	7 December 1966	TM3252266270; 52°14′44″N 1°24′17″E	1377166	Church of St Peter More images	
Butley Abbey and Priory Gate House	Butley	Abbey	14th century	16 March 1966	TM3747449368; 52°05′30″N 1°27′55″E	1030850	Butley Abbey and Priory Gate House More images	
Church of St Peter	Charsfield	Parish Church	13th century	16 March 1966	TM2542156574; 52°09′41″N 1°17′40″E	1030343	Church of St Peter More images	
Church of St Mary	Chediston	Parish Church	Medieval	7 December 1966	TM3584077785; 52°20′51″N 1°27′40″E	1030488	Church of St Mary More images	
Church of St Michael	Cookley	Parish Church	Medieval	7 December 1966	TM3495275348; 52°19′33″N 1°26′47″E	1030493	Church of St Michael More images	
Church of St Mary	Cratfield	Parish Church	15th century	7 December 1966	TM3138474826; 52°19′22″N 1°23′38″E	1030502	Church of St Mary More images	
Church of All Saints	Darsham	Parish Church	15th century	7 December 1966	TM4209069920; 52°16′27″N 1°32′50″E	1198791	Church of All Saints More images	
Church of St Mary	Dennington	Parish Church	14th century	7 December 1966	TM2815966965; 52°15′13″N 1°20′29″E	1030822	Church of St Mary More images	
Church of St Mary	Earl Soham	Parish Church	15th century	7 December 1966	TM2364663284; 52°13′20″N 1°16′23″E	1030573	Church of St Mary More images	
Church of All Saints	Easton	Parish Church	13th century	7 December 1966	TM2830858768; 52°10′48″N 1°20′17″E	1030590	Church of All Saints More images	
Church of All Saints	Eyke	Parish Church	14th century	16 March 1966	TM3172151777; 52°06′57″N 1°22′59″E	1030431	Church of All Saints More images	
Landguard Fort	Felixstowe	Artillery Fort	1711	10 February 1986	TM2834831895; 51°56′19″N 1°19′14″E	1030415	Landguard Fort More images	
Church of St Michael	Framlingham	Parish Church	16th century	7 December 1966	TM2853863508; 52°13′20″N 1°20′40″E	1030391	Church of St Michael More images	
Framlingham Castle	Framlingham	Castle	12th century	18 December 1985	TM2866663768; 52°13′29″N 1°20′48″E	1030383	Framlingham Castle More images	
Poor-house to Framlingham Castle	Framlingham	Poor house	1729	25 October 1951	TM2864863742; 52°13′28″N 1°20′47″E	1283709	Poor-house to Framlingham Castle More images	
Church of All Saints	Great Glemham	Parish Church	15th century	7 December 1966	TM3399361635; 52°12′12″N 1°25′23″E	1278504	Church of All Saints More images	
Church of St Mary	Grundisburgh	Church	13th century	16 March 1966	TM2234651073; 52°06′48″N 1°14′45″E	1377182	Church of St Mary More images	
Church of All Saints	Hacheston	Parish Church	14th century	7 December 1966	TM3119658502; 52°10′35″N 1°22′48″E	1199742	Church of All Saints More images	
Church of St Margaret	Heveningham	Parish Church	15th century	7 December 1966	TM3333572583; 52°18′06″N 1°25′15″E	1030466	Church of St Margaret More images	
Heveningham Hall	Heveningham	Country House	1780	25 October 1951	TM3508473429; 52°18′31″N 1°26′50″E	1183040	Heveningham Hall More images	
Heveningham Hall Orangery	Heveningham	Orangery	c. 1790	25 October 1951	TM3515173249; 52°18′25″N 1°26′53″E	1377319	Upload Photo	
Church of St Mary	Huntingfield	Parish Church	15th century	7 December 1966	TM3362674308; 52°19′02″N 1°25′35″E	1183091	Church of St Mary More images	
Church of St Mary and St Peter	Kelsale	Parish Church	15th century	7 December 1966	TM3879065176; 52°13′59″N 1°29′44″E	1199020	Church of St Mary and St Peter More images	
Church of St Andrew	Kettleburgh	Parish Church	14th century	7 December 1966	TM2649860628; 52°11′50″N 1°18′46″E	1283194	Church of St Andrew More images	
St Mary's Abbey	Leiston, Suffolk Coastal	Abbey	1382	13 March 1951	TM4452164174; 52°13′17″N 1°34′43″E	1215753	St Mary's Abbey More images	
Church of St Peter	Levington	Church	c. 1500	16 March 1966	TM2343939022; 52°00′17″N 1°15′14″E	1377335	Church of St Peter More images	
Church of St Margaret	Linstead Parva	Parish Church	16th century	7 December 1966	TM3373277726; 52°20′52″N 1°25′49″E	1030442	Church of St Margaret More images	
Church of St Andrew	Little Glemham	Parish Church	15th century	7 December 1966	TM3465558712; 52°10′36″N 1°25′50″E	1230821	Church of St Andrew More images	
Little Glemham Hall	Little Glemham	Country House	1717	25 October 1951	TM3464559144; 52°10′50″N 1°25′51″E	1278507	Little Glemham Hall More images	
Church of St Andrew	Marlesford	Parish Church	15th century	7 December 1966	TM3232958311; 52°10′27″N 1°23′47″E	1278312	Church of St Andrew More images	
Church of St Mary	Newbourne	Parish Church	14th century	16 March 1966	TM2729743061; 52°02′22″N 1°18′46″E	1377128	Church of St Mary More images	
Orford Castle	Orford	Keep	1165-7	16 March 1966	TM4194349872; 52°05′39″N 1°31′51″E	1030873	Orford Castle More images	
Church of St Bartholomew	Orford	Church	14th century	16 March 1966	TM4222649988; 52°05′43″N 1°32′06″E	1377119	Church of St Bartholomew More images	
Otley Hall	Otley	Manor House	16th century	16 March 1966	TM2070456245; 52°09′37″N 1°13′31″E	1198837	Otley Hall More images	
Church of St Mary	Parham	Parish Church	14th century	7 December 1966	TM3095060510; 52°11′40″N 1°22′40″E	1030531	Church of St Mary More images	
Church of St Gregory the Great	Rendlesham	Parish Church	14th century	16 March 1966	TM3252252827; 52°07′29″N 1°23′44″E	1183412	Church of St Gregory the Great More images	
Church of All Saints	Saxtead	Parish Church	15th century	7 December 1966	TM2624465739; 52°14′36″N 1°18′45″E	1030537	Church of All Saints More images	
Church of St Peter	Sibton	Church	15th century	21 December 1984	TM3674269543; 52°16′23″N 1°28′07″E	1283976	Church of St Peter More images	
Church of St Peter	Theberton	Parish Church	12th century	7 December 1966	TM4372965918; 52°14′15″N 1°34′06″E	1227756	Church of St Peter More images	
St Peter's Church	Thorington	Parish Church	12th century	7 December 1966	TM4228374144; 52°18′43″N 1°33′11″E	1030681	St Peter's Church More images	
Church of St Martin	Tuddenham St Martin	Church	15th century	16 March 1966	TM1917248422; 52°05′27″N 1°11′53″E	1030516	Church of St Martin More images	
Blyth Turrets	Ubbeston	House	16th century	7 December 1966	TM3232672579; 52°18′08″N 1°24′22″E	1183254	Blyth Turrets More images	
Church of St Mary	Ufford	Church	15th century	16 March 1966	TM2985852184; 52°07′13″N 1°21′22″E	1030273	Church of St Mary More images	
St Andrew's Church	Walberswick	Church	1426	7 December 1966	TM4898374725; 52°18′51″N 1°39′06″E	1283823	St Andrew's Church More images	
Church of St John the Baptist	Wantisden	Parish Church	14th century	16 March 1966	TM3625353235; 52°07′37″N 1°27′01″E	1284058	Church of St John the Baptist More images	
Church of St Peter	Wenhaston	Parish Church	14th century	7 December 1966	TM4249375475; 52°19′26″N 1°33′25″E	1030612	Church of St Peter More images	
Church of St Mary Magdalene	Westerfield	Church	c. 1300	19 December 1951	TM1751647621; 52°05′03″N 1°10′24″E	1236090	Church of St Mary Magdalene More images	
Church of St Mary	Witnesham	Church	14th century	25 January 1985	TM1800250903; 52°06′48″N 1°10′57″E	1183185	Church of St Mary More images	
Church of St Mary	Woodbridge	Church	15th century	25 January 1951	TM2706849088; 52°05′37″N 1°18′48″E	1377024	Church of St Mary More images	
The Old Bell and Steelyard Inn	Woodbridge	Steelyard	1550	25 January 1951	TM2720449145; 52°05′38″N 1°18′56″E	1031046	The Old Bell and Steelyard Inn More images	
The Shire Hall and Corn Exchange	Woodbridge	Corn Exchange	c. 1575	25 January 1951	TM2708449139; 52°05′38″N 1°18′49″E	1377037	The Shire Hall and Corn Exchange More images	
Tide Mill	Woodbridge	Watermill	12th century	25 January 1951	TM2759548735; 52°05′24″N 1°19′15″E	1300451	Tide Mill More images	
Cockfield Hall	Yoxford	House	1613	25 October 1951	TM3959669133; 52°16′05″N 1°30′36″E	1030621	Cockfield Hall More images	
Holy Trinity Church	Barsham	Parish Church	15th century	1 September 1953	TM3969989633; 52°27′07″N 1°31′35″E	1032028	Holy Trinity Church More images	
Church of St Michael	Beccles	Church	c. 1350	16 March 1948	TM4209590482; 52°27′31″N 1°33′43″E	1186885	Church of St Michael More images	
Beccles bell tower	Beccles	Tower	1540	16 March 1948	TM4212590453; 52°27′30″N 1°33′45″E	1298972	Beccles bell tower More images	
Leman House	Beccles	House	16th century	16 March 1948	TM4195090153; 52°27′21″N 1°33′35″E	1205376	Leman House More images	
Roos Hall	Beccles	House	16th century	16 March 1948	TM4145389987; 52°27′16″N 1°33′08″E	1280729	Roos Hall More images	
St Peter's House	Beccles	House	18th century	16 March 1948	TM4212290585; 52°27′34″N 1°33′45″E	1298958	Upload Photo	
Waveney House	Beccles	House	16th century	16 March 1948	TM4204790580; 52°27′34″N 1°33′41″E	1186941	Waveney House More images	
Church of St Mary	Blundeston	Parish Church	14th century	27 November 1954	TM5134597234; 52°30′54″N 1°42′11″E	1251145	Church of St Mary More images	
Church of All Saints	Blyford	Church	13th century	1 September 1953	TM4245876746; 52°20′07″N 1°33′27″E	1182809	Church of All Saints More images	
Church of St Peter	Brampton	Church	15th century	1 September 1953	TM4349281536; 52°22′40″N 1°34′34″E	1352565	Church of St Peter More images	
Butter Cross	Bungay	Cross	1689	9 May 1949	TM3363689773; 52°27′21″N 1°26′14″E	1275987	Butter Cross More images	
Bungay Castle	Bungay	Castle	12th century	9 May 1949	TM3354789776; 52°27′21″N 1°26′10″E	1034404	Bungay Castle More images	
Church of Holy Trinity	Bungay	Church	15th century	9 May 1949	TM3382089714; 52°27′19″N 1°26′24″E	1216997	Church of Holy Trinity More images	
Church of St Mary and ruins of Bungay Priory	Bungay	Church	15th century	9 May 1949	TM3368589733; 52°27′20″N 1°26′17″E	1216850	Church of St Mary and ruins of Bungay Priory More images	
Church of St Andrew	Covehithe	Parish Church	1672	27 November 1954	TM5231081878; 52°22′36″N 1°42′20″E	1032168	Church of St Andrew More images	
Church of All Saints	Ellough	Parish Church	15th century	1 September 1953	TM4428986659; 52°25′24″N 1°35′29″E	1352599	Church of All Saints More images	
Church of All Saints	Frostenden	Church	15th century	27 November 1954	TM4792381755; 52°22′40″N 1°38′28″E	1032170	Church of All Saints More images	
Church of Holy Trinity	Gisleham	Parish Church	Medieval	17 April 1986	TM5141788571; 52°26′14″N 1°41′51″E	1182784	Church of Holy Trinity More images	
Church of St Mary	Henstead	Parish Church	15th century	17 April 1986	TM4883386086; 52°24′58″N 1°39′28″E	1182832	Church of St Mary More images	
Church of St Edmund	Kessingland	Parish Church	16th century	17 April 1986	TM5277586266; 52°24′57″N 1°42′57″E	1182858	Church of St Edmund More images	
Church of All Saints	Mettingham	Parish Church	14th century	1 September 1953	TM3628989985; 52°27′24″N 1°28′35″E	1284396	Church of All Saints More images	
Church of St Andrew	Mutford	Parish Church	14th century	17 April 1986	TM4863088591; 52°26′19″N 1°39′24″E	1032081	Church of St Andrew More images	
Church of St Botolph	North Cove	Parish Church	Medieval	1 September 1953	TM4616289390; 52°26′49″N 1°37′16″E	1032041	Church of St Botolph More images	
Church of St Michael	Oulton	Parish Church	14th century	27 November 1954	TM5100893578; 52°28′56″N 1°41′43″E	1352641	Church of St Michael More images	
Church of St Peter	Redisham	Parish Church	14th century	1 September 1953	TM4081984365; 52°24′15″N 1°32′20″E	1032042	Church of St Peter More images	
Church of St Michael and St Felix	Rumburgh	Church	15th century	1 September 1953	TM3464881871; 52°23′04″N 1°26′48″E	1283749	Church of St Michael and St Felix More images	
Church of St Michael and All Angels	Rushmere	Parish Church	Medieval	17 April 1986	TM4951088008; 52°25′59″N 1°40′09″E	1032082	Church of St Michael and All Angels More images	
Church of St John the Baptist	Shadingfield	Church	13th century	1 September 1953	TM4348583797; 52°23′53″N 1°34′39″E	1183123	Church of St John the Baptist More images	
Church of St Margaret	Herringfleet	Parish Church	16th century	27 November 1954	TM4766397814; 52°31′19″N 1°38′57″E	1031950	Church of St Margaret More images	
Church of St Mary	Ashby	Parish Church	16th century	27 November 1954	TM4897699037; 52°31′56″N 1°40′10″E	1352636	Church of St Mary More images	
Church of St Margaret	Sotterley Park, Sotterley	Church	14th century	1 September 1953	TM4592485285; 52°24′37″N 1°36′52″E	1032097	Church of St Margaret More images	
Sotterley Hall	Sotterley	Country House	c. 1745	17 March 1986	TM4590385204; 52°24′34″N 1°36′51″E	1183257	Sotterley Hall More images	
Church of St Lawrence	South Cove	Parish Church	15th century	27 November 1954	TM4999980884; 52°22′08″N 1°40′16″E	1032143	Church of St Lawrence More images	
Church of St Edmund	Southwold	Church	c1430-1470	21 April 1949	TM5075076388; 52°19′42″N 1°40′43″E	1384321	Church of St Edmund More images	
Church of St Andrew	Ilketshall St Andrew	Church	15th century	1 September 1953	TM3791387238; 52°25′53″N 1°29′54″E	1032019	Church of St Andrew More images	
Church of All Saints	South Elmham	Parish Church	14th century	1 September 1953	TM3296882802; 52°23′37″N 1°25′21″E	1031997	Church of All Saints More images	
Church of St George	St Cross, South Elmham	Parish Church	12th century	1 September 1953	TM2995484266; 52°24′29″N 1°22′46″E	1032003	Church of St George More images	f
South Elmham Hall	South Elmham	Bishops Palace/House	16th century	1 September 1953	TM3071483216; 52°23′54″N 1°23′23″E	1031966	South Elmham Hall More images	
Church of St James	St James, South Elmham	Parish Church	15th century	1 September 1953	TM3227281216; 52°22′47″N 1°24′41″E	1198203	Church of St James More images	
Church of St Margaret	Ilketshall St Margaret	Parish Church	12th century	27 August 1986	TM3497885242; 52°24′53″N 1°27′14″E	1198096	Church of St Margaret More images	
Church of St Margaret	St Margaret, South Elmham	Parish Church	14th century	1 September 1953	TM3141083967; 52°24′17″N 1°24′02″E	1198266	Church of St Margaret More images	
Church of St Michael	St Michael, South Elmham	Sundial	13th century	1 September 1953	TM3414783943; 52°24′12″N 1°26′27″E	1352613	Church of St Michael More images	
Church of St Mary	Uggeshall	Parish Church	12th century	17 March 1986	TM4555080396; 52°22′00″N 1°36′19″E	1284129	Church of St Mary More images	
Church of St Peter and St Paul	Wangford	Parish Church	15th century	27 November 1954	TM4659279119; 52°21′17″N 1°37′11″E	1182389	Church of St Peter and St Paul More images	
Church of St Andrew	Westhall	Church	14th century	1 September 1953	TM4232580434; 52°22′06″N 1°33′29″E	1352611	Church of St Andrew More images	
Church of St Peter	Weston	Parish Church	Medieval	1 September 1953	TM4290787106; 52°25′41″N 1°34′18″E	1032007	Church of St Peter More images	
Church of St Andrew	Wissett	Parish Church	14th century	1 September 1953	TM3661279292; 52°21′38″N 1°28′25″E	1199160	Church of St Andrew More images	
Worlingham Hall	Worlingham	Country House	18th century	1 September 1953	TM4425990176; 52°27′18″N 1°35′37″E	1032013	Worlingham Hall More images	
Church of St Nicholas	Wrentham	Parish Church	15th century	27 November 1954	TM4890783015; 52°23′19″N 1°39′24″E	1284532	Church of St Nicholas More images	
Church of St Margaret	Lowestoft	Parish Church	15th century	13 December 1949	TM5415594188; 52°29′11″N 1°44′31″E	1292943	Church of St Margaret More images	

== See also ==
- Grade I listed buildings in Suffolk
