= Ellough =

Civil parish in Suffolk, England

Coordinates: 52.431°N 1.606°E

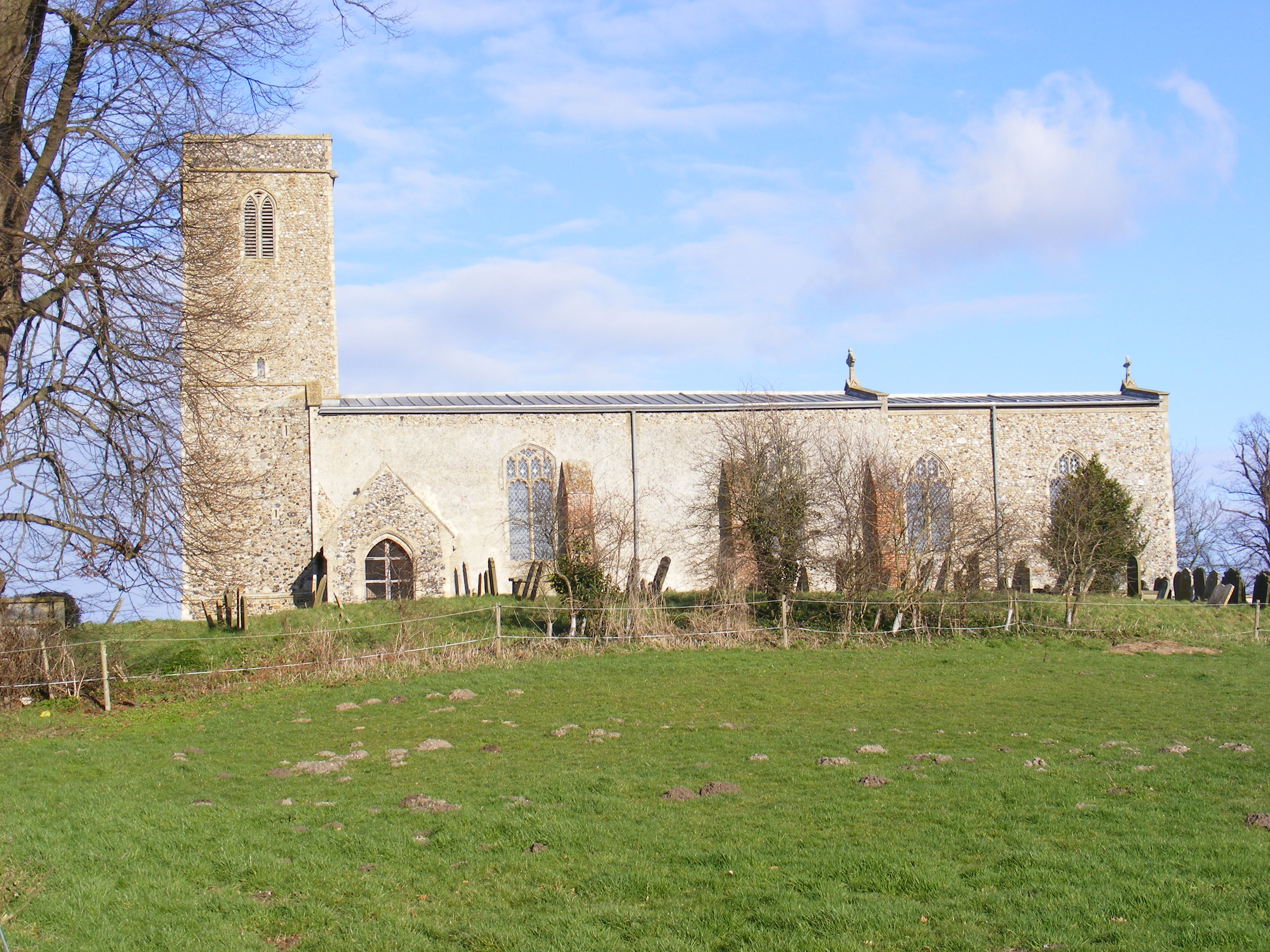
- All Saints Church, Ellough

- Location within Suffolk
- Area: 4.5 km^{2} (1.7 sq mi)
- Population: 40 (2005 est.)
  - Density: 9/km^{2} (23/sq mi)
- OS grid reference: TM443871
- Civil parish: Ellough
- District: East Suffolk
- Shire county: Suffolk
- Region: East
- Country: England
- Sovereign state: United Kingdom
- Post town: BECCLES
- Postcode district: NR34
- Dialling code: 01502
- UK Parliament: Lowestoft

Ellough is a civil parish in the East Suffolk district of the English county of Suffolk, located approximately 3 miles (5 km) south-east of Beccles. The area is sparsely populated with a mid-2005 population estimate of 40. (Note: 2011 United Kingdom census population data does not report population figures for parishes where the population is small enough to potential identify individuals. As a result no population figure is available for Ellough at the census.) The parish, which has an area of 4.5 square kilometres (1.7 mi^{2}), borders Worlingham, North Cove, Mutford, Weston, Sotterley, Willingham St Mary and Henstead with Hulver Street. The parish council operates to administer jointly the parishes of Shadingfield, Willingham St Mary, Sotterley and Ellough.

The parish was the site of a World War II airfield built in 1943, with part of it still operating today as Beccles Airfield. Other parts of the former airfield are used as a kart racetrack and as an industrial estate, including the main production site of local printing firm William Clowes Ltd. The village itself is dispersed and has few services. The A145 road, forming part of the Beccles southern bypass, runs along part of the northern border of the parish.

== History ==
At the time of the Domesday survey, Ellough, known then as Elga, was a small settlement of four or five households. It formed part of the lands of Roger Bigot and was held by Robert of Vaux, having been confiscated from Ralph Guader, former Earl of Norfolk, following a failed rebellion. It is recorded as El'gh prior to 1400 and as Ellowe on a map of 1610.

The manor passed through a number of owners, including the Playters of Sotterley, before being owned by the Earl of Gosford in the 1840s. The church held some of the glebe land of St Mary's church in Willingham. The population of the parish was 155 in 1848, falling to 125 in 1871, at which time the parish was worth £1,687 and consisted of 1,097 acres of land. The population declined dramatically following the second world war and now stands at less than 50.

== All Saints Church ==
Ellough church is dedicated to All Saints and stands in an exposed position on a ridge overlooking the parish. It is medieval in origin, was heavily restored in the late 19th century, and is now a Grade I listed building. It stands to the south of the valley of the Hundred River which has its mouth at Kessingland.

== RAF Beccles ==
Ellough Airfield was completed in 1943 and served as an RAF Bomber Command and RAF Coastal Command airfield during World War II as RAF Beccles. The airfield was decommissioned after the war and the land is now used as an industrial estate, a farmers market and for Ellough Park Raceway, a kart racing circuit. William Clowes Ltd. printers moved to the industrial park in 2004 and the park has one of the UK's largest solar roof installation sited on the roof of a Promens warehouse and with a generating capacity of 1.65MW. A series of solar farms have been built around the southern and western edges of the site.

A basic airstrip, known as Beccles Airfield, remains at the site, used as a training base and private airfield. For a time a heliport operated to service oil and gas rigs in the North Sea.
