= Worlingham =

Village in Suffolk, England

Coordinates: 52.452°N 1.595°E

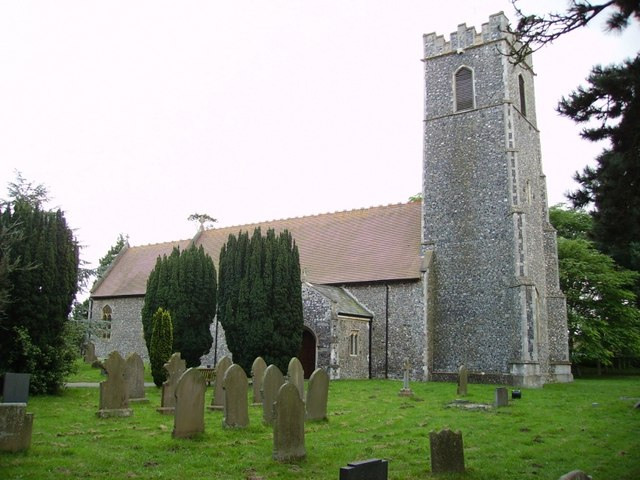
- All Saints Parish Church

- Location within Suffolk
- Area: 7 km^{2} (2.7 sq mi)
- Population: 3,745 (2011)
  - Density: 535/km^{2} (1,390/sq mi)
- OS grid reference: TM444898
- District: East Suffolk
- Shire county: Suffolk
- Region: East
- Country: England
- Sovereign state: United Kingdom
- Post town: Beccles
- Postcode district: NR34
- Dialling code: 01502
- UK Parliament: Lowestoft

Worlingham is a village and civil parish in the East Suffolk district of the English county of Suffolk. It is about 1.3 miles (2.1 km) east of Beccles, with the two places effectively joined to form one urban area. At the 2011 census it had a population of 3,745; the combined population of Beccles and Worlingham is 13,868. The parish has increased in population in recent years due to the development of suburban housing areas within the built up area, going up by over 13% between the 2001 and 2011 censuses.

Worlingham is around 5 miles (8.0 km) west of Lowestoft and 17 miles (27 km) south-east of Norwich. The parish is bordered to the north by the River Waveney and northern sections form part of The Broads National Park area. The Ipswich to Lowestoft railway line passes through this area, with the nearest railway station at Beccles.

Other than Beccles, the parish borders the parishes of North Cove, Mutford, Ellough and Weston. To the north the parish of Aldeby lies across the River Waveney in Norfolk. The A146 Beccles bypass, built during the 1980s, passes through the parish whilst the A145 Beccles southern relief road runs along the parish's eastern and southern borders. Parts of the Beccles Airfield site along the A145 are located within the parish; these are used for a variety of industrial uses, including the printing works of William Clowes which relocated from Beccles in the early 21st century.

== Community facilities ==
Worlingham has a limited range of shops including a local grocery and sub-post office, hairdresser, fish and chip shop, pharmacy and small newsagent. There are a number of parks.

The village church, which is approximately 900 years old, is dedicated to All Saints. Worlingham Hall is an 18th-century country house now converted to a country house hotel.

Worlingham CofEVC Primary School serves the village and children attend Sir John Leman High School in Beccles from age 11. A community steering group has been created to bring life back into the village by giving the local children and teenagers places to go and do activities. House prices in Worlingham are some of the highest in the northern area of East Suffolk District (formerly Waveney District).
