= Barnby, Suffolk =

Village in Suffolk, England

Coordinates: 52.448°N 1.641°E

Barnby
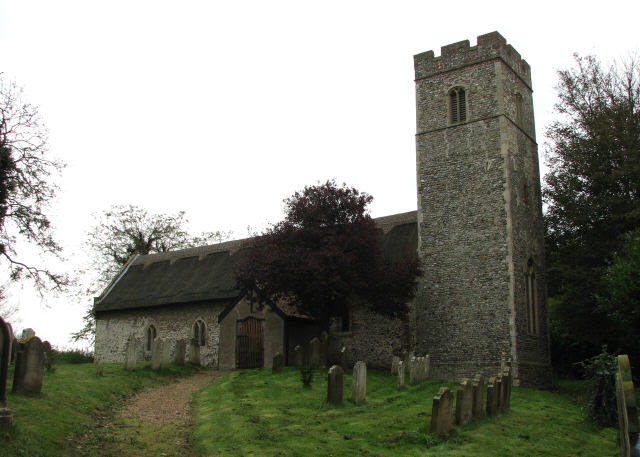
- St John the Baptist's church

- Location within Suffolk
- Area: 4 km^{2} (1.5 sq mi)
- Population: 479 (2011)
  - Density: 120/km^{2} (310/sq mi)
- OS grid reference: TM476895
- District: East Suffolk
- Shire county: Suffolk
- Region: East
- Country: England
- Sovereign state: United Kingdom
- Post town: Beccles
- Postcode district: NR34
- Dialling code: 01502
- UK Parliament: Lowestoft

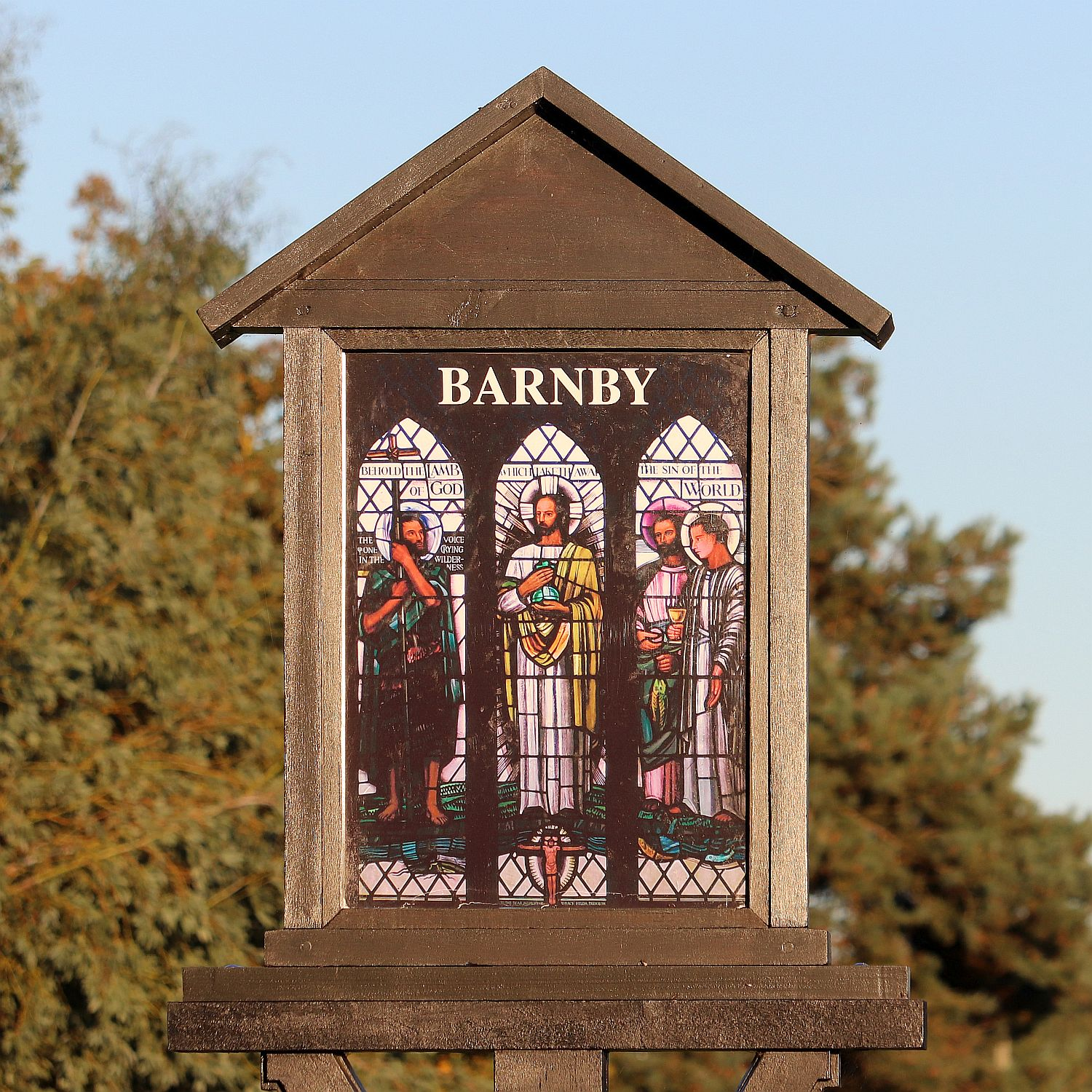
Barnby Village Sign

Barnby is a village and civil parish in the East Suffolk district of Suffolk, England. The village is 5 miles (8.0 km) west of Lowestoft and 3 miles (4.8 km) east of Beccles in the north of the county. It is effectively merged with the village of North Cove which constitutes a separate parish.

At the 2011 United Kingdom census the population of the parish was 479. This had fallen slightly from a mid-2005 estimated population of 510. (Note: 2011 United Kingdom census population data from the Office for National Statistics used a 'best-fit' method and, as a result, does not necessarily map exactly to parish boundaries.) Other than North Cove, it is bordered by Carlton Colville to the east, Mutford to the south, and to the north the Norfolk parish of Burgh St Peter across the river.

The northern border of the parish is marked by the River Waveney and the northern area lies within The Broads National Park. The village lies on the A146 road running between Norwich and Lowestoft. This bypasses the built up area on a series of bends known locally as the "Barnby bends". The Ipswich to Lowestoft railway line runs through the north of the parish, with the nearest stations at Oulton Broad South and Beccles.

== History ==
The village was mentioned in the Domesday Book of 1086. It had an average population at this time with about 13 families in the village. The village formed part of the holdings of Earl Hugh of Chester.

== Culture and community ==
The village contains a public house and a garden centre. Barnby and North Cove Primary School educates around 45 children aged 4 to 11. It is federated with Southwold primary school, sharing a headteacher. At age 11 children transfer to Sir John Leman High School in Beccles.

The village church is dedicated to St John the Baptist and is a grade II* listed building. The nave and chancel date from the 13th century with a 14th-century tower. There are the remains of three 15th-century wall paintings inside the church.

== Barnby Broad and Marshes SSSI ==
Barnby Broad and Marshes is designated as a Site of Special Scientific Interest. It covers an area of 189.6 hectares (469 acres) of grazing marsh, carr woodland and fen running from the village to the banks of the River Waveney to the north, much of it in the parish of North Cove. Barnby Broad itself is an area of open water resulting from medieval peat cutting and is part of the Broads system. A range of natural and semi-natural habitats are present in the area which is an important bird nesting site.
