= Mutford =

Village in Suffolk, England

Coordinates: 52.437°N 1.655°E

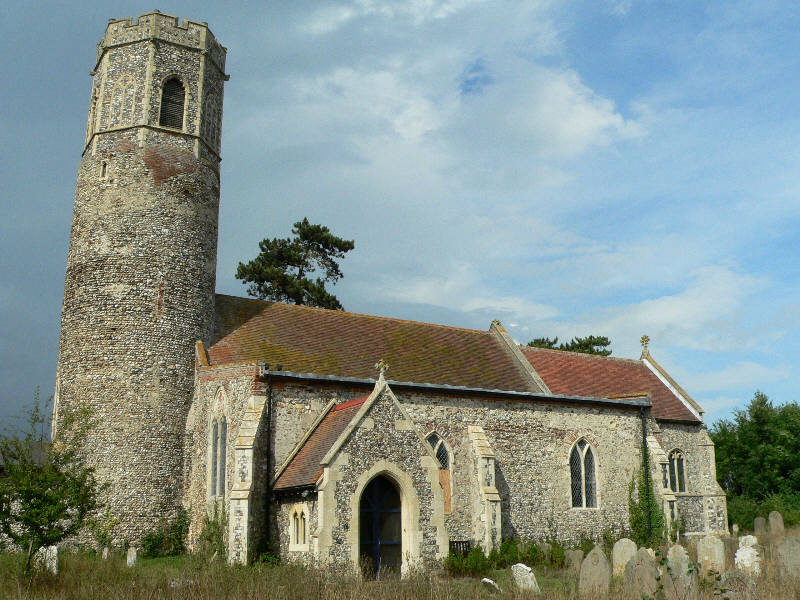
- Mutford church

- Location within Suffolk
- Area: 6 km^{2} (2.3 sq mi)
- Population: 471 (2011)
  - Density: 79/km^{2} (200/sq mi)
- OS grid reference: TM486884
- District: East Suffolk
- Shire county: Suffolk
- Region: East
- Country: England
- Sovereign state: United Kingdom
- Post town: Beccles
- Postcode district: NR34
- Dialling code: 01502
- UK Parliament: Lowestoft

Mutford is a village and civil parish in the East Suffolk District of the English county of Suffolk. The village is 5 miles (8.0 km) south-west of Lowestoft and 4 miles (6.4 km) south-east of Beccles in a rural area. The parish borders Barnby, Carlton Colville, Gisleham, Rushmere, Henstead with Hulver Street, Ellough and North Cove. The village gave its name to the Half Hundred of Mutford which is named in the Domesday Book.

The parish had a population of 471 at the 2011 United Kingdom census. The A146 Beccles to Lowestoft road runs to north of the parish, cutting through the north-western corner. The Hundred River marks the southern boundary with Henstead with Hulver Street.

== Culture and community ==
The majority of the parish is rural, with the main centre of population centred on an area in the centre of the parish. The post office closed in 2013, with few services remaining beyond a village hall and playing field. The medieval church of St Andrew is one of around 40 round-tower churches in Suffolk (Note: The exact number of round-tower churches in the county is a matter of debate. Some sources list 38, others cite between 40 and 43. They almost all date from the late Anglo-Saxon or early Norman periods and were mostly built between the 11th and 14th-centuries. There are around 183 round-tower churches in England, most of them in Norfolk, which has around 124, and Suffolk. Four of the churches now in Norfolk were previously in Suffolk before boundary changes in 1974.) and is a Grade I Listed Building.

== Notable people ==
Sir Stanley Rous, former president of FIFA, was born in Mutford in 1895, as was, in 1919, professional footballer Ivan Flowers. Also born in the village was Bill Crooks, manager of Eastwoodhill Arboretum, Ngatapa, Gisborne, New Zealand from 1967 to 1974.
