= Shadingfield =

Village in Suffolk, England

Coordinates: 52.398°N 1.579°E

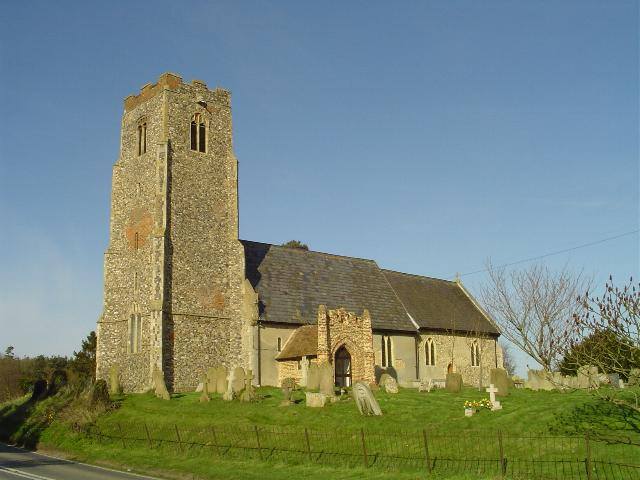
- Shadingfield St John the Baptist

- Location within Suffolk
- Area: 6 km^{2} (2.3 sq mi)
- Population: 178 (2011)
  - Density: 30/km^{2} (78/sq mi)
- OS grid reference: TM435838
- District: East Suffolk
- Shire county: Suffolk
- Region: East
- Country: England
- Sovereign state: United Kingdom
- Post town: Beccles
- Postcode district: NR34
- Dialling code: 01502
- UK Parliament: Waveney

Shadingfield is a village and civil parish in the East Suffolk district of the English county of Suffolk. It is located around 4 miles (6.4 km) south of Beccles in the north of the county.

The village is spread along a 1 1/4 miles (2.0 km) stretch of the A145 road between Beccles and Blythburgh to the south. The Ipswich to Lowestoft railway line runs through the west of the parish, with the nearest stations at Brampton and Beccles railway stations.

The village itself is joined with Willingham St Mary and 1 1/2 miles (2.4 km) west of Sotterley. The parish council operates to administer jointly the parishes of Shadingfield, Willingham, Sotterley and Ellough. Other than Willingham and Sotterley, the parish also borders Brampton with Stoven, Redisham and Weston.

At the 2011 United Kingdom census the population of the parish was 178. This had risen slightly from a mid-2005 population estimate of 170, (Note: 2011 United Kingdom census population data from the Office for National Statistics used a 'best-fit' method and, as a result, does not necessarily map exactly to parish boundaries.) and significantly from a 1981 population of 103. Some houses in Redisham village are within the Shadingfield parish area.

== Culture and community ==
Shadingfield and Willingham share the limited amenities in the village, with the village hall, playground area and a pub, the Shadingfield Fox, all on the parish boundary. Children attend a primary school in Brampton and the Sir John Leman High School in Beccles. The local church, alongside the A145, is dedicated to St John the Baptist.

Shadingfield Hall is a Grade II listed Georgian house. It was built between 1806 and 1808 for Thomas Charles Scott, replacing a mid 16th-century manor house. Scott's son, the Reverend T C Scott was Rector of Shadingfield until 1897. The house is now on the Sotterley estate. Then Prime Minister Gordon Brown took his family holiday at Shadingfield Hall in the summer of 2008.
