= All Saints Church, Ellough =

Coordinates: 52.4233°N 1.5915°E

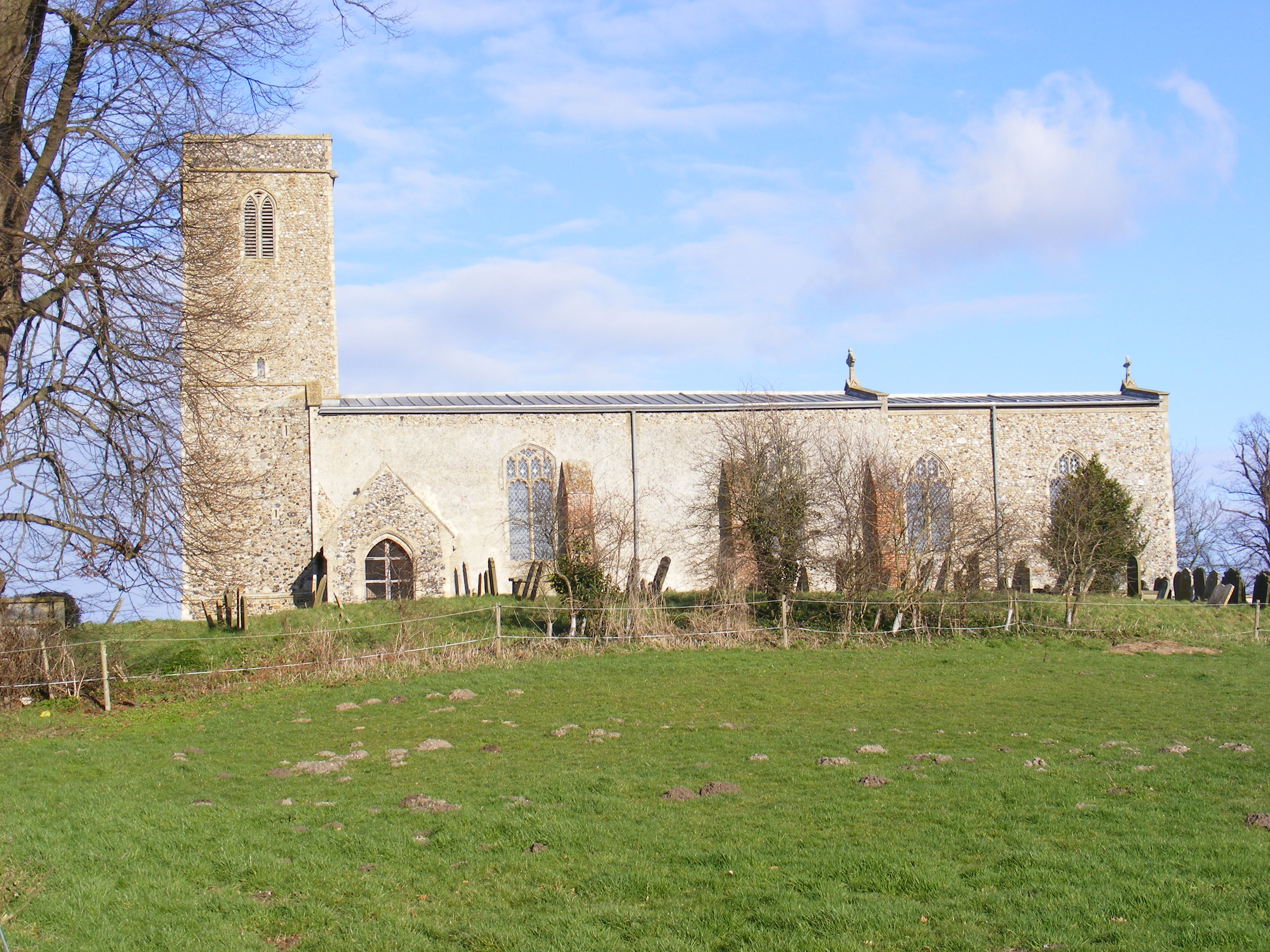
- All Saints Church, Ellough, from the south

- Location in Suffolk
- OS grid reference: TM 443 866
- Location: Ellough, Suffolk
- Country: England
- Denomination: Anglican
- Website: Churches Conservation Trust

Architecture
- Functional status: Redundant
- Heritage designation: Grade I
- Designated: 1 September 1953
- Architectural type: Church
- Style: Gothic
- Groundbreaking: 14th century
- Closed: 1970s

Specifications
- Materials: Flint with stone dressings

All Saints Church is a redundant Anglican church in the parish of Ellough, Suffolk, England. The church is medieval in origin and is recorded in the National Heritage List for England as a designated Grade I listed building, and is under the care of the Churches Conservation Trust. The church stands in an isolated position on the top of a low hill, some 2.5 miles (4 km) to the south-east of Beccles.

== History ==
The church dates from the 14th century, and a south porch was added in 1602, paid for by Thomas Love. Wall paintings were removed in 1643 when William Dowling, a strict puritan, visited the church. Land from the glebe of the church of St Marys in Willingham St Mary, the site of which is visible from the church, was consolidated with Ellough in the 18th century. The church was restored in 1882 by William Butterfield, including the replacement of the east window. Its parish was combined with that of Weston in the 1970s and All Saints was largely closed with only occasional services taking place.

Richard Aldous Arnold became rector of Ellough in 1830, a post he held for more than 60 years. He was the father of Australian politician William Munnings Arnold and the rower Frederick Arnold, both of whom were born at Ellough. Memorials to Arnold and his wife are found on the south wall of the chancel. Arnold is credited with building the parsonage immediately to the west of the church, which dates to around 1830 and is a Grade II listed building.

== Architecture ==
All Saints is constructed in flint rubble with stone dressings. The nave is rendered, and the roofs are felted. Its plan consists of a two-bay nave, a two-bay chancel, a south porch, a north organ chamber and a west tower. The tower dates from the 14th century and is unbuttressed. It has two-light bell openings containing Y-tracery, and a flat parapet. The nave contains 15th-century two-light windows. Its north doorway is blocked, and the south nave doorway and porch date from the 19th century. The chancel has two-light windows on its sides, and a three-light 19th-century east window.

Inside the church is a 14th-century piscina and a sedilia. The stairs leading to the former rood loft are still present. The octagonal font dates from the 15th century, and its bowl is carved with shields and flowers. The reredos and the chancel ceiling were designed by Butterfield. The memorials include two brasses in the sanctuary, and there is a ledger slab dating from the middle of the 18th century in the chancel. Many of the fittings have been removed.

== See also ==
- List of churches preserved by the Churches Conservation Trust in the East of England
