= EGSM =

EGSM may refer to:

- Beccles Airfield, Suffolk, England, ICAO code EGSM
- E-GSM, an extension of the GSM-900 frequency range
