= Willingham St Mary =

Village in Suffolk, England

Coordinates: 52.413°N 1.594°E

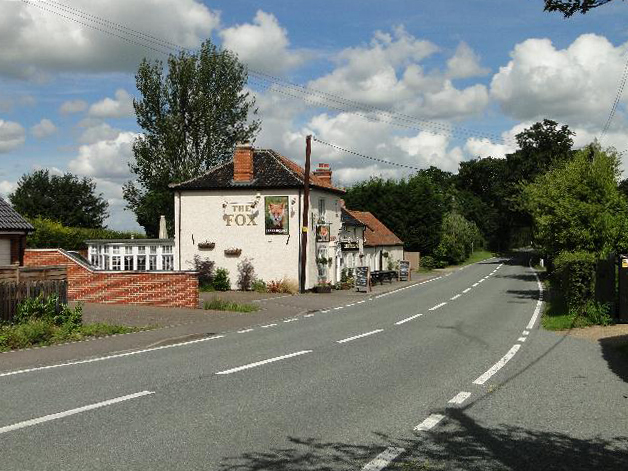
- The Fox public house on the A145 at Willingham St Mary

- Location within Suffolk
- Area: 4 km^{2} (1.5 sq mi)
- Population: 152 (2011)
  - Density: 38/km^{2} (98/sq mi)
- OS grid reference: TM445855
- District: East Suffolk
- Shire county: Suffolk
- Region: East
- Country: England
- Sovereign state: United Kingdom
- Post town: Beccles
- Postcode district: NR34
- Dialling code: 01502
- UK Parliament: Waveney

Willingham St Mary, also known simply as Willingham, is a village and civil parish in the English county of Suffolk located about 3.5 miles (6 km) south of Beccles in the East Suffolk district. Sections of the Sotterley estate are included within Willingham's western section. At the 2011 United Kingdom census, it had a population of 152.

== Overview ==
The largest population resides in the area where Willingham adjoins Shadingfield and where the A145 road cuts through the parish. Due to the small size of the village, children attend primary school in Brampton and high school in Beccles. The Fox public house on the A145 is within the parish boundary, although it is more commonly associated with Shadingfield. The two parishes also share a village hall and playing field, both located on the parish border. A joint parish council covers the parishes of Ellough, Shadingfield, Sotterley and Willingham St Mary. Willingham also borders the parish of Weston.

== History ==
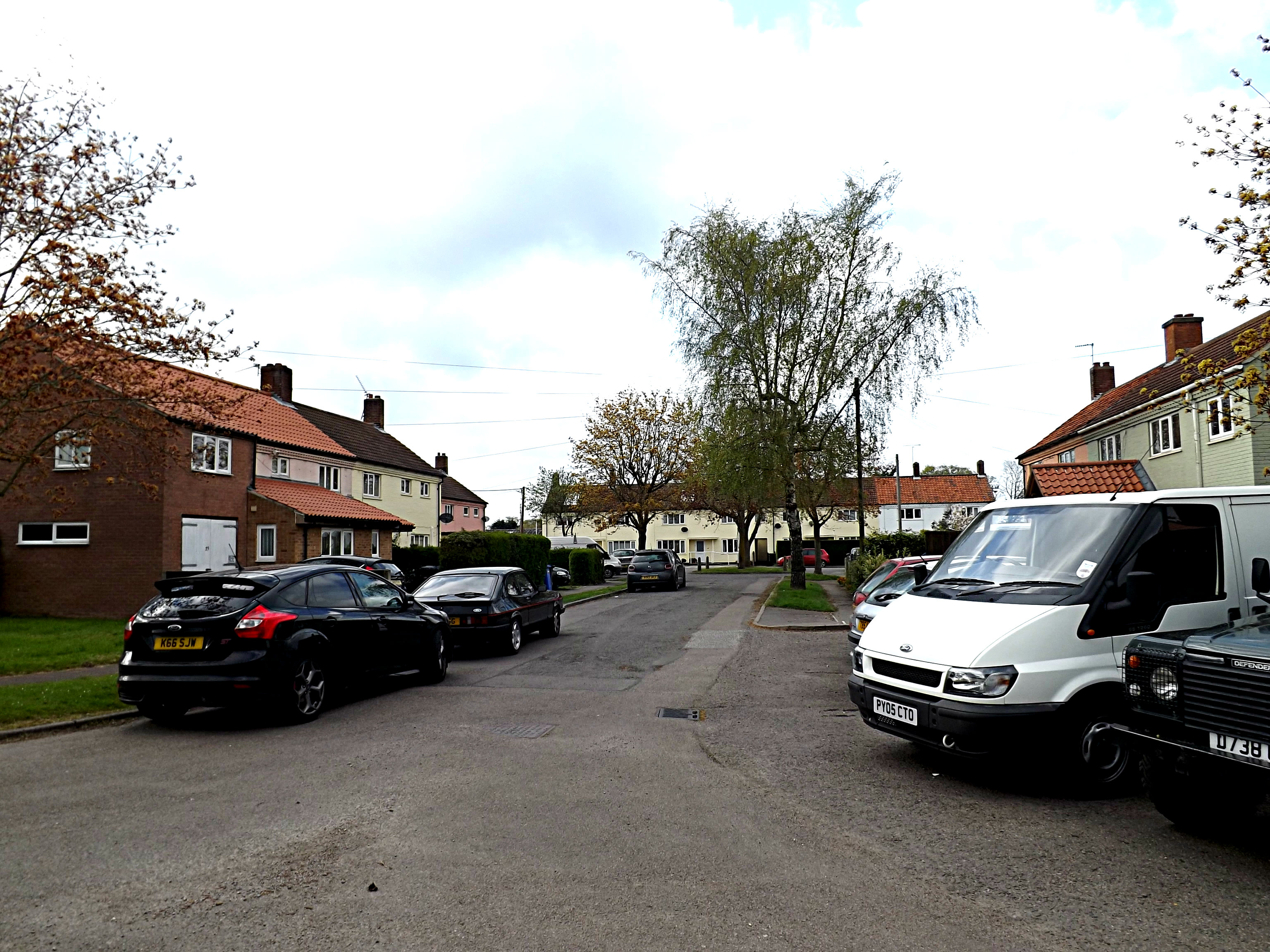
Post-war council housing at Chartres Piece, Willingham

At the Domesday Book survey of 1086, the village of "Willingaham" formed part of the estates of Hugh de Montfort. It consisted of around 31 families, including at least 15 freemen, and paid 5 geld in taxation. In 1281, the village formed part of the estate of Elisabeth Bruisyard and passed through various hands, including to the Playters of Sotterley, before becoming part of the estate of the Earl of Gosford, who owned the manor in 1846. It consisted of around 1,000 acres (400 ha) and had a population of 156 in 1848. By 1872 the population was 142 in 31 houses. The population has fluctuated slightly, although it has remained largely unchanged since the 1801 census, which record a population of 136.

There are four Grade II listed buildings in the parish: the 18th-century Fox Farmhouse; a late 17th- to early 18th-century timber-framed barn at Moat Farm; the late 16th- to early 17th-century Willingham Hall; and a late 17th-century timber-framed barn at Willingham Hall. Willingham Hall is located near one of two possible sites of a parish church believed to have fallen into disrepair at the beginning of the 16th century. Human bones have been observed in ploughsoil from one of the suspected sites for the church. The church, which was dedicated to St Mary and existed at the time of the Domesday survey, was recorded as "scarcely visible" by Suckling in 1846, although some remains could be seen in the 1920s. The parish was united with North Cove in 1526 and consolidated with Ellough following the reformation. In 1873 the rectory was united with the church at Sotterley. The area around the hall and church are possibly part of a deserted medieval village. A number of ditches and pottery finds indicate buildings were located in this area and a settlement is shown on a map from the late 18th century.
