= North Cove =

Village in Suffolk, England

Coordinates: 52.447°N 1.629°E

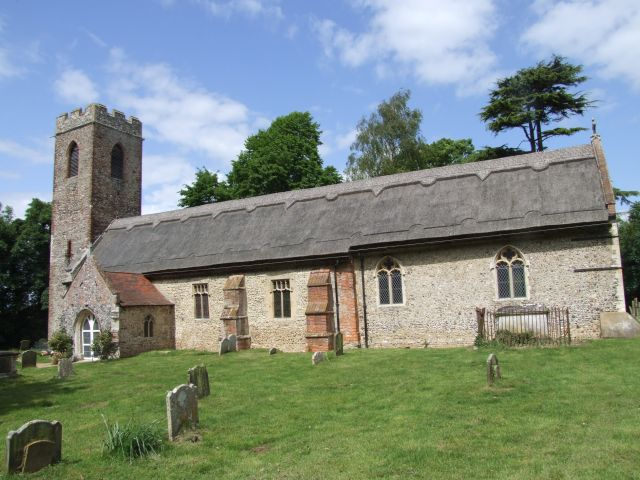
- Church of St Botolph

- Location within Suffolk
- Area: 5 km^{2} (1.9 sq mi)
- Population: 449 (2011)
  - Density: 90/km^{2} (230/sq mi)
- OS grid reference: TM467894
- Civil parish: North Cove
- District: East Suffolk
- Shire county: Suffolk
- Region: East
- Country: England
- Sovereign state: United Kingdom
- Post town: Beccles
- Postcode district: NR34
- Dialling code: 01502
- UK Parliament: Lowestoft

North Cove is a village and civil parish in the north of the English county of Suffolk. It is part of the East Suffolk district, located around 3 miles (4.8 km) east of Beccles and 5 miles (8.0 km) west of Lowestoft. It merges with the village of Barnby and the villages share some resources, although the two parishes retain separate parish councils.

The parish has an area of 5 square kilometres (1.9 mi^{2}) and at the 2011 United Kingdom census had a population of 449. (Note: 2011 United Kingdom census population data from the Office for National Statistics used a 'best-fit' method and, as a result, does not necessarily map exactly to parish boundaries.) This was estimated to have fallen slightly to 424 by 2016.

The northern section of the parish is inside the area of the Broads National Park, with the River Waveney forming the parish's northern boundary. The Ipswich to Lowestoft railway line runs through the parish, with the nearest railway stations at Beccles and Oulton Broad. The village is bypassed to the south by the A146 road, with the A145 Beccles to Blythburgh road joining the A146 in the parish.

Part of Beccles Airfield is in the extreme south of the parish where it borders Ellough. Worlingham lies to the immediate west, with Mutford and Barnby to the east and the south Norfolk parishes of Burgh St Peter and Aldeby being north of the River Waveney.

== History ==
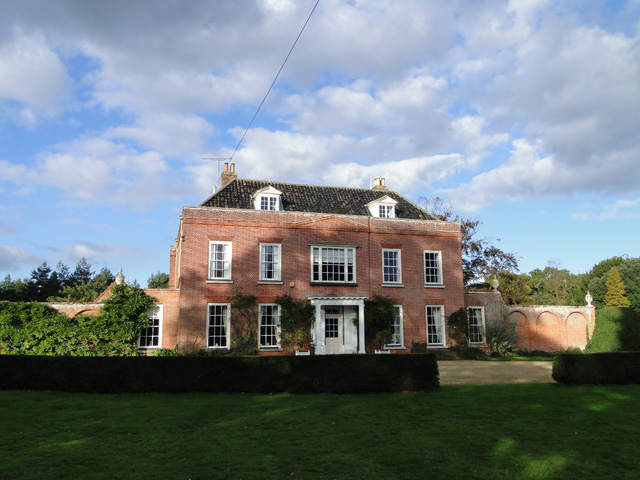
North Cove Hall, a Grade II* listed building

North Cove is not mentioned in the Domesday Book, although Barnby is described as a medium-sized village at this time, and it is likely that the parish was part of Worlingham at this time. The name probably refers to a creek from the then tidal estuary of the River Waveney and the village first appears in its own right in documents in 1204. Archaeological remains suggest that there was Romano-British habitation in the area in the 2nd to 4th century.

The parish church dates from the 12th century, and Wade Hall is a moated manorial site on the edge of the marshes to the north of the village which dates from the medieval period. This includes a mound which was possibly a tower platform. The manor, which was sometimes called Wathe, is recorded as being held by Robert Watheby of Cumberland in the 12th century. Wade Hall itself dates from the 17th century and is a listed building. North Cove Hall, on the western edge of the village, dates from the 17th century and is a Grade II* listed building.

In 1848 North Cove is recorded as having a population of 219 with the parish having annexed that of Willingham St Mary to the south.

Within the parish is the site of the lost village of Worlingham Parva which was recorded in the Domesday survey. This village had a round tower Saxon church dating from about 950 and dedicated to St Peter. Remains of the church and cemetery, including burials, were discovered in 1980 when a bypass was built around Beccles. The church is known to have still been in use in 1474.

== Church of St Botolph ==
The parish church is dedicated to St Botolph and contains medieval wall paintings and a thatched roof. It dates from the 12th century and has a number of medieval features including doorways and windows and a 15th-century square tower. It is a Grade I listed building which was rebuilt in parts in the 19th century.

The wall paintings are thought to be 14th century in origin and have been judged to be "some of the finest surviving medieval wall-paintings in all East Anglia". The paintings depict the Passion of Christ and judgement day. They were painted over in the later medieval period, restored in the 19th century and then in the 1990s to return them to their original condition.

== Culture and community ==
Barnby and North Cove Primary School, which is located in Barnby, educates around 45 children aged 4 to 11. It is federated with Southwold primary school, sharing a headteacher. At age 11 children transfer to Sir John Leman High School in Beccles.

The village also contains a public house, The Three Horseshoes, which dates from the 17th century.

== Barnby Broad and Marshes SSSI ==
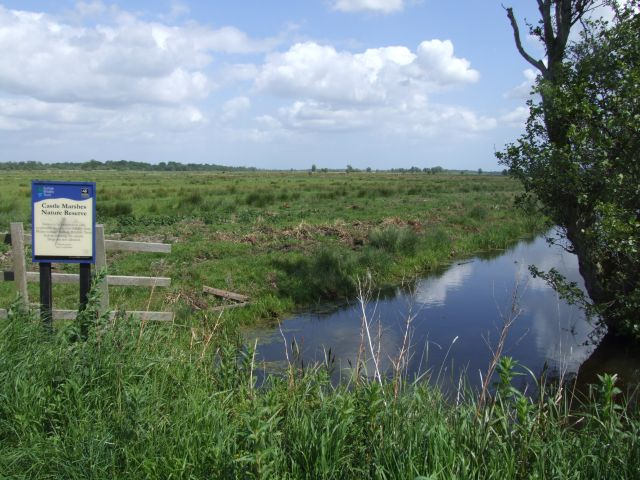
Castle Marshes Nature Reserve, part of Barnby Broad and Marches SSSI

Barnby Broad and Marshes is designated as a Site of Special Scientific Interest. It covers an area of 189.6 hectares (469 acres) of grazing marsh, carr woodland and fen running from the village to the banks of the River Waveney to the north. A range of natural and semi-natural habitats are present in the area which is an important bird nesting site and Suffolk Wildlife Trust maintains two nature reserves on the area.
