= Beccles Town Hall =

Municipal building in Beccles, Suffolk, England

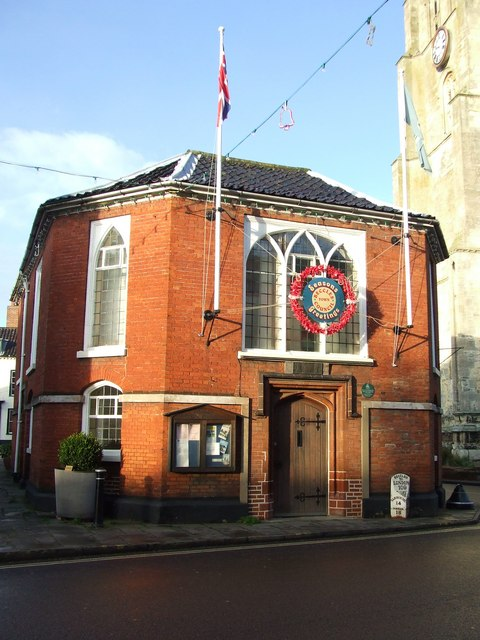
- Beccles Town Hall

- Shown in Suffolk
- 52.4581°N 1.5626°E
- Location: New Market, Beccles

History
- Built: 1726

Site notes
- Architectural style: Gothic Revival style

Listed Building – Grade II
- Official name: Town Hall
- Designated: 16 March 1948
- Reference no.: 1205749

Beccles Town Hall is a municipal structure in New Market, Beccles, Suffolk, England. The structure, which accommodates the offices and meeting place of Beccles Town Council, is a Grade II listed building.

== History ==
The first structure on the site was a medieval market hall and market cross. After the old building became dilapidated, civic leaders decided to demolish it and to replace it with a new structure. The new building was designed in the Gothic Revival style, built in red brick and completed in 1726. The lord of the manor, Robert Sparrow, agreed to grant the building to trustees in 1765, at which time it was substantially rebuilt.

The design involved a symmetrical main frontage with just three bays facing onto The Walk; the central bay featured a Tudor-style doorway on the ground floor and a large three-light gothic-style casement window on the first floor. The outer bays, which were canted giving the building an elongated octagonal shape, featured arched windows on the ground floor and single-light gothic-style casement windows on the first floor, and it originally had an octagonal turret above the doorway. Internally, the principal rooms were the courtroom and the mayor's parlour.

In the 19th century the courtroom served as the venue for both the quarters sessions and the petty sessions, and, following significant population growth, largely associated with the status of Beccles as a market town, the area became a municipal borough with the town hall as its headquarters in 1835. A public library and a literary institute were established in the town hall in 1874. Another building, which had been erected as the Assembly Rooms and Theatre in Smallgate in 1785, was confusingly referred to as the New Town Hall in the late 19th century, but by the early 20th century it had been renamed Beccles Public Hall.

The borough council acquired a large Georgian House known as Kilbrack in Blyburgate in 1947 and then converted it into municipal offices for council officers and their departments; however, the council continued to use the town hall as its main meeting place until 1974 when it ceased to be the local seat of government on the formation of the enlarged Waveney District Council. A finely sculpted coat of arms of Queen Elizabeth I dated 1589 was recovered from a timber-framed house on the south side of New Market and installed in the town wall in the 1980s, and a plaque to celebrate the life of the winner of the Nobel Prize in Chemistry, Dorothy Hodgkin, was installed on the south elevation of the town hall following her death in 1994.
