= No. 279 Squadron RAF =

Defunct flying squadron of the Royal Air Force

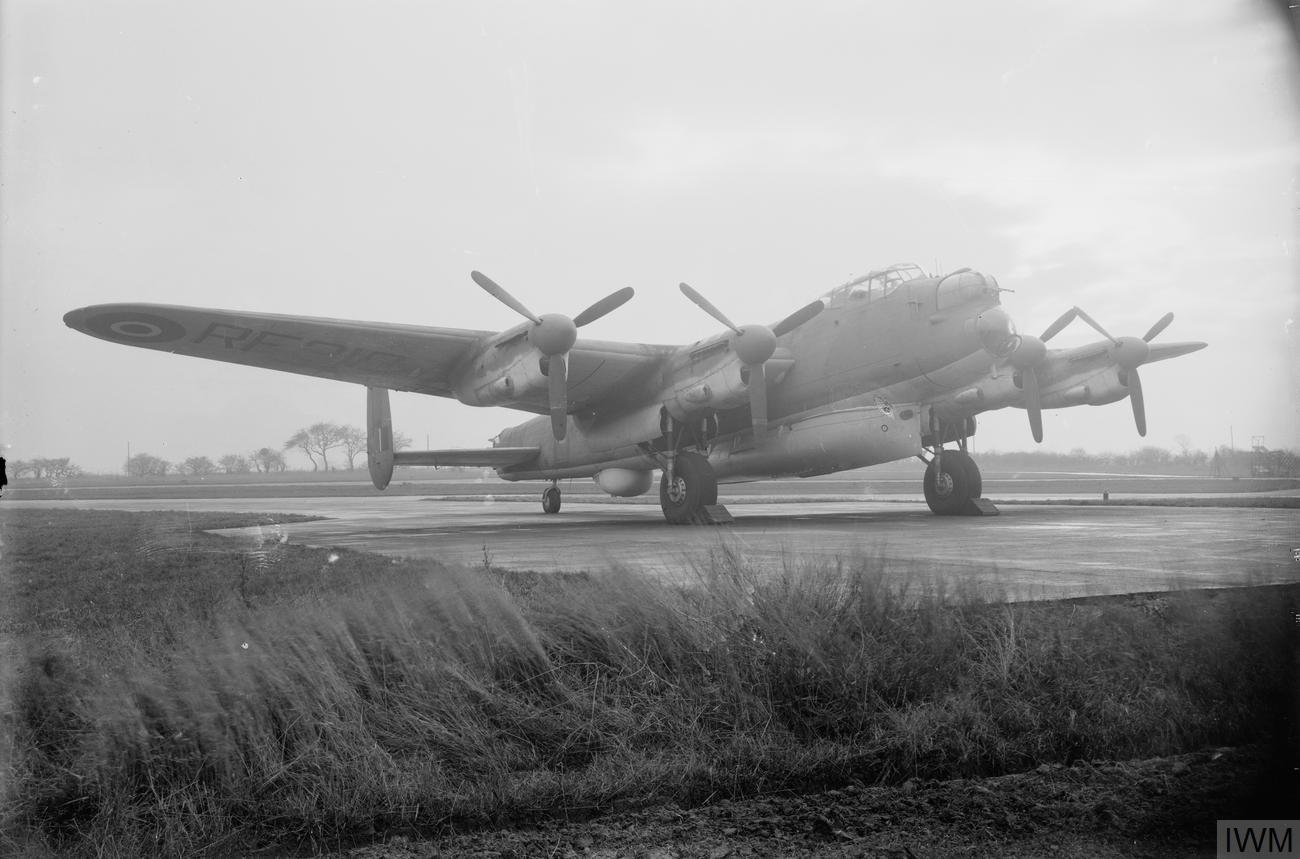
- One of No. 279 Squadron's Avro Lancasters carrying a lifeboat in December 1945
- Active: 16 Nov 1941 – 10 Mar 1946
- Country: United Kingdom
- Branch: Royal Air Force
- Role: Air-sea rescue
- Motto(s): To See and be Seen

Insignia
- Squadron Badge heraldry: Above waves of the sea, nine flashes of lightning
- Squadron codes: OS (Nov 1941 - Nov 1944); RL (Nov 1944 - Mar 1946)

No 279 Squadron RAF was a Royal Air Force air-sea rescue squadron of World War II. The squadron was formed on 16 November 1941 and disbanded on 10 March 1946.

== History ==
No. 279 Squadron was formed at RAF Bircham Newton on 16 November 1941. It was originally equipped with Lockheed Hudsons fitted, from 1943, to carry Mark I airborne lifeboats. Detachments of the squadron were stationed at several RAF stations in the south-west of England between April 1942 and December 1943 to provide an air-sea rescue capability over the Bay of Biscay and Western Approaches.

In October 1944 No. 279 Squadron was transferred to RAF Thornaby and re-equipped with Vickers Warwick aircraft. The squadron subsequently deployed detachments to RAF airfields in the north of Scotland to provide support to patrol and strike squadrons. Following the end of the war the Warwicks were replaced with Avro Lancasters in September 1945. These were flown until the squadron was disbanded on 10 March 1946 at RAF Beccles by being renumbered to No. 38 Squadron. A detachment had left in January 1946 for Pegu in Burma and upon arrival there around March was designated 1348 Air Sea Rescue Flight.

== Aircraft operated ==
Aircraft operated by No. 279 Squadron
From	To	Aircraft	Version
November 1941	November 1944	Lockheed Hudson	Mks. III, V, VI
November 1944	September 1945	Vickers Warwick	ASR Mks.I, VI
April 1945	June 1945	Hawker Hurricane	Mks.IIc, IV
July 1945	September 1945	Supermarine Sea Otter	Mk.II
September 1945	March 1946	Avro Lancaster	ASR.3

== Squadron locations ==
Airfields used by No. 279 Squadron
From	To	Airfield	Remark
16 November 1941	14 October 1944	RAF Bircham Newton	Posted
28 April 1942	29 May 1942	RAF Sumburgh	Detachment
29 June 1942	1942	RAF Benbecula	Detachment
15 July 1942	1942	RAF Leuchars	Detachment
26 July 1942	15 August 1942	RAF Reykjavik, Iceland	Detachment
14 August 1942	15 August 1942	RAF Thorney Island	Detachment
15 August 1942	19 August 1942	RAF Chivenor	Detachment
23 August 1942	5 February 1943	RAF St Eval	Detachment
25 September 1942	1942	RAF Beaulieu	Detachment
5 February 1943	9 June 1943	RAF Davidstow Moor	Detachment
9 June 1943	14 December 1943	RAF Harrowbeer	Detachment
28 September 1943	1945	RAF Wick	Detachment
1 January 1944	1 August 1944	RAF Reykjavik, Iceland	Detachment
1 October 1944	September 1945	RAF Tain	Detachment
1 October 1944	September 1945	RAF Wick	Detachment
14 October 1944	3 September 1945	RAF Thornaby	Posted
31 October 1944	27 December 1944	RAF Banff	Detachment
27 December 1944	September 1945	RAF Fraserburgh	Detachment
26 May 1945	September 1945	RAF Reykjavik, Iceland	Detachment
July 1945	September 1945	RAF Banff	Detachment
3 September 1945	10 March 1946	RAF Beccles	Posted
