= Weston, Suffolk =

Village in Suffolk, England

Coordinates: 52.425°N 1.574°E

Weston
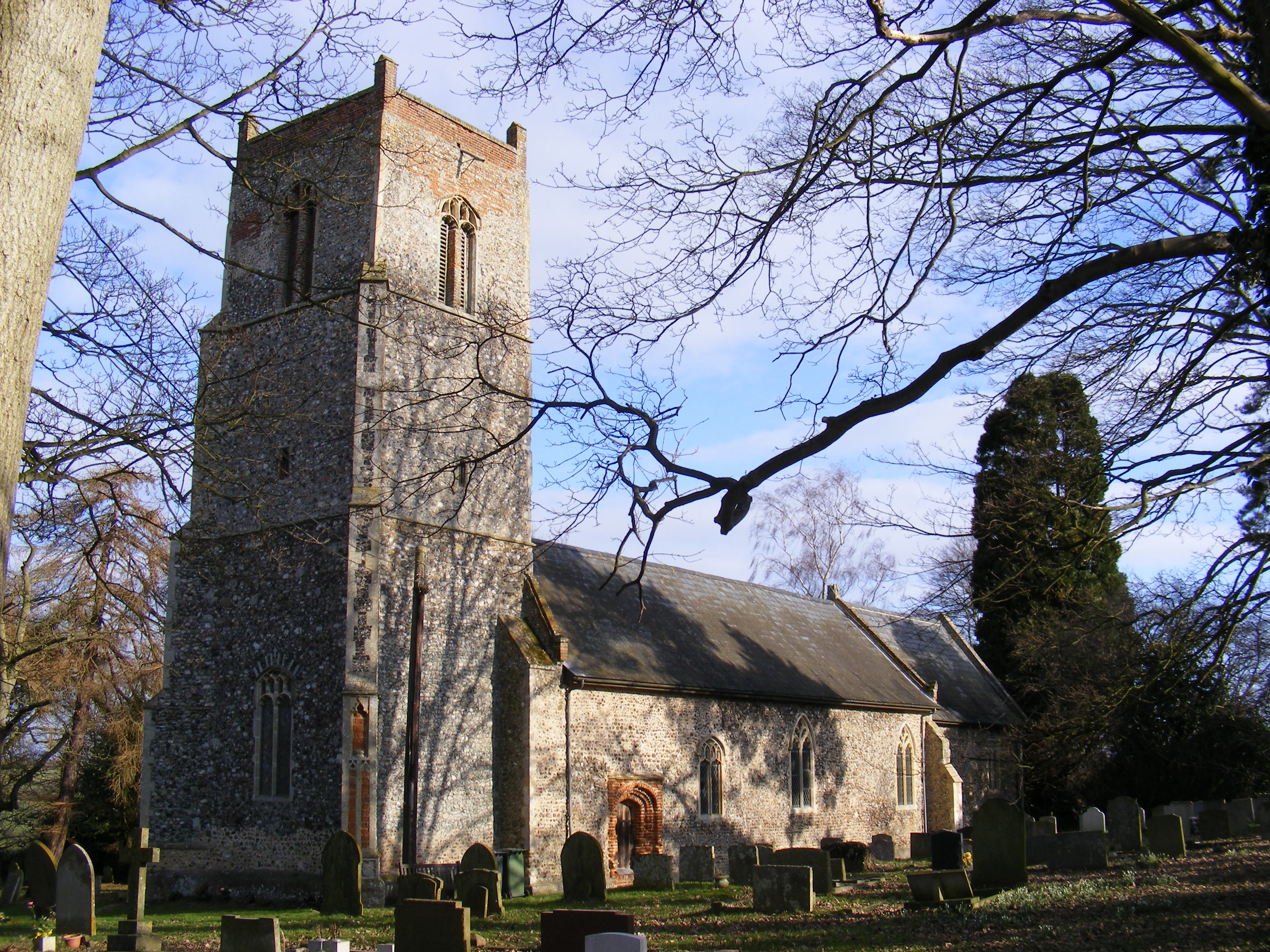
- Church of St Peter, Weston

- Location within Suffolk
- Area: 6 km^{2} (2.3 sq mi)
- Population: 230 (2005 est.)
  - Density: 38/km^{2} (98/sq mi)
- OS grid reference: TM428871
- District: East Suffolk
- Shire county: Suffolk
- Region: East
- Country: England
- Sovereign state: United Kingdom
- Post town: Beccles
- Postcode district: NR34
- Dialling code: 01502
- UK Parliament: Waveney

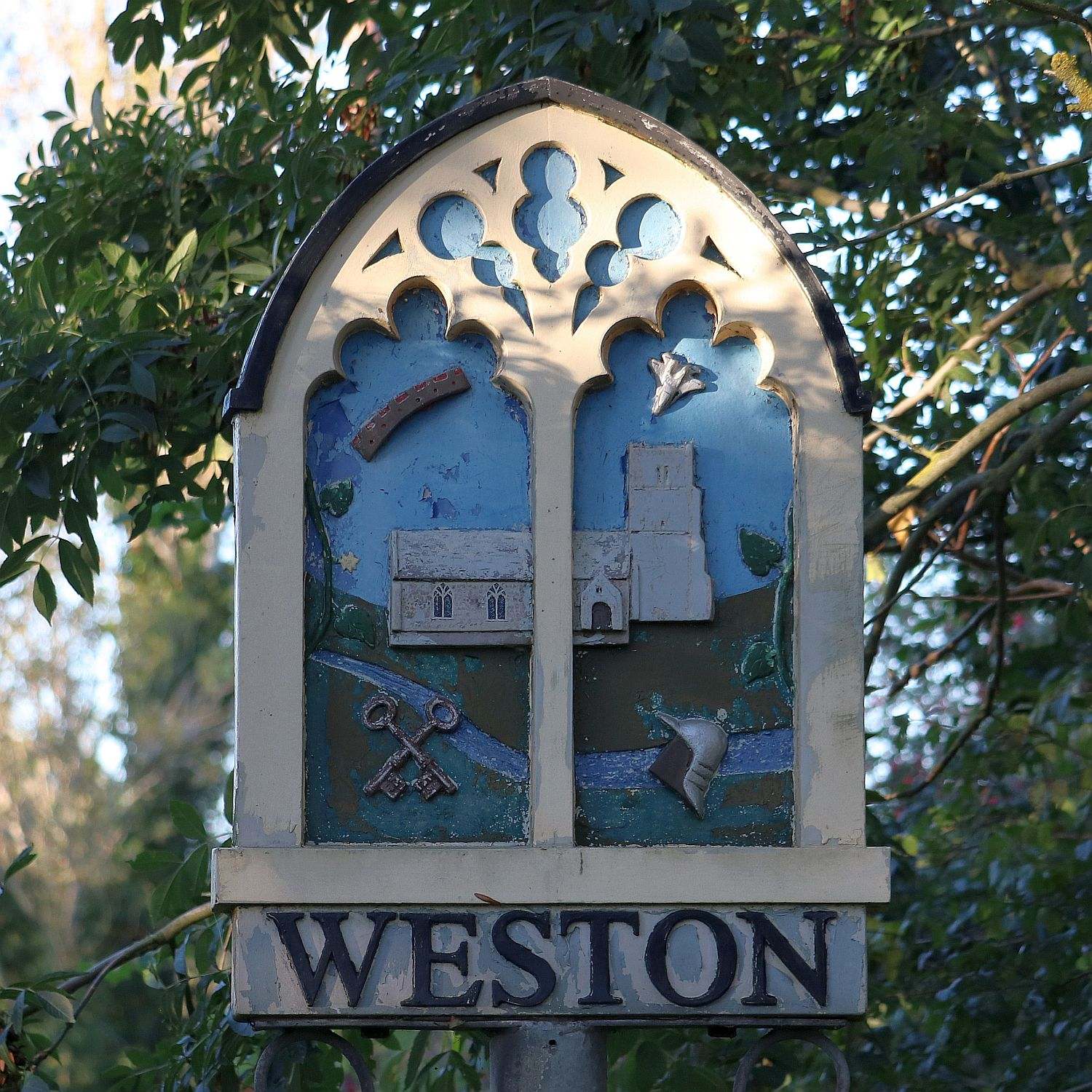
Weston Village Sign

Weston is a village and civil parish in the English county of Suffolk. It is around 2 miles (3 km) south of Beccles in the East Suffolk district. The parish lies either team of the A145 road and is crossed by the Ipswich to Lowestoft railway line. Neighbouring parishes include Ellough, Ringsfield, Willingham St Mary and Shadingfield. The village is largely dispersed with a population of around 230. (Note: 2011 United Kingdom census population data does not report population figures for parishes where the population is small enough to potential identify individuals and the population of Weston was combined with that of Ellough, which has an estimated population of around 40. As a result no population figure is available for either parish at the census.)

The village has few services and a joint parish council covers both Ringsfield and Weston. The village once had a school, on King's Lane, and a public house, the Duke of Marlborough on the main A145. Both are now closed and the major centre of population in the parish is to the west where it borders Ringsfield Corner.

The parish church is medieval in origin and dedicated to St Peter. It has a primarily Norman core and is a Grade I listed building. The parish was combined with that of All Saints Church, Ellough in the 1970s.

== History ==
The village is named in the Domesday Book as Westuna and formed part of the William the Conqueror's estate, with land also being held by Roger Bigot, Hugh de Montfort and Geoffrey de Mandeville. The village, which formed part of the Hundred of Wangford, had a population of around 30 families and paid around 2 geld in taxation.

The manor passed through many hands, including, in the reign of Henry I, the Lord Chancellor William Longchamp. Weston Hall was built in the late 16th century for the Rede family and partly demolished following a fire in 1821. The population of the parish was 211 in 1841, rising to 261 in 1871 and remaining at around that level until after the second world war.

== The church of St Peter ==
The main body of the church is Norman in origin, built of local flint and mainly dating from the 12th century. It has a square 15th-century tower and 15th-century porch with a 13th-century chancel and doorway to the nave. Suckling describes the church as "in a wretched state of repair and neglect" in 1846, at which time it was thatched. The building was restored in the 1860s, including the renewal of many of the windows, although remnants of earlier windows remain.

Inside, the church has a high 15th-century octagonal baptismal font carved with representations of the seven sacraments. The font stands over six feet above the floor of the church on a Maltese cross. A series of 15th-century carved bench ends and the remnants of three 16th-century wall paintings also remain within the church, which also features a rare example of the Arms of James II on the south nave wall.
