= Ellough Park Raceway =

Kart racing track in Suffolk, England

- Interactive map of Ellough Park Raceway
- Location: Ellough, Suffolk, England
- Coordinates: 52.434°N 1.601°E
- Type: Flood-lit kart racing and minimoto track

Construction
- Built: Early 1960s
- Opened: 2000
- Expanded: 2000, 2007, 2010, 2022

Website
- elloughpark.co.uk

Ellough Park Raceway is a kart racing track in Ellough in the English county of Suffolk. It is located around 2 miles (3 km) south-east of the market town of Beccles. It is primarily used for kart racing as it is a fast, but tight and twisty circuit.

The track, which is fully floodlit, has existed on the old Ellough Airfield since the early 1960s, but was not fully developed until 2000, when ex-Formula 1 driver Jackie Oliver opened the circuit. The authorities at the circuit extended it in 2007, from 800m to just over 1000m to make it more suitable for other forms of kart and minimoto racing. The circuit was extended further in 2010 to incorporate a new pits complex and add extra paddock space for hosting the Formula Kart Stars championship.

In 2022 the current owner of the circuit (Simon Francis) further extended the track. There is now a 190m straight which incorporates a breath taking and very physical chicane as well as 180 degree banked curve taken at full speed. The circuit is now over 1100m and is probably one the most demanding within the UK.

Today, the track plays host to national and local kart championships, as well as charity events, stag parties and corporate days which use the arrive and drive facilities at the track. A small clubhouse, shop and changing facilities are available.

== Park Champions ==
=== Open Grand Prix ===
Overall Champion

- 2002 – Steve English
- 2003 – Joe Larkin
- 2004 – Matt Bond
- 2005 – Steve English
- 2006 – Tony Rumball
- 2007 – Mel Paul

- 2008 – Andy Horne
- 2009 – Andy Horne
- 2010 – James Barnes
- 2011 – Guy Newstead
- 2012 – Alex Ready
- 2013 – Alex Ready

- 2014 – Tom Griffiths
- 2015 – Tom Griffiths
- 2016 – Tom Griffiths
- 2017 – Brett Wheatley
- 2018 – Brett Wheatley
- 2019 – Brett Wheatley

Heavyweight Champion

- 2012 – Lee Henderson

- 2013 – Lee Henderson

- 2014 – Lee Henderson

Rookie of the Year

- 2011 – Luke Cousins
- 2012 – Ian Howes

- 2013 – Dan Walker

- 2014 – James Lane

=== Open Endurance ===
Champion

- 2003 – Gill Building (Nick Gill, Andrew Gill)
- 2004 – Team Max Downforce (Matt Bond, Derek Flegg, Tom Ashton)
- 2005 – Red Dot (Tom Morfoot, Tony Rumball)
- 2006 – Brown Streak (Tony Rumball, Steve English, Heidi Bacon)
- 2011 – Pulham Pigs (Sinclair Glover, Steve Algar, Jerry Scoggins)
- 2012 – Ninpo (Ian Sandell, James Pearce)

- 2013 – GP Exiles (Alex Ready, Chris Lodge, Alex Vingoe)
- 2014 – Pulham Pigs (Sinclair Glover, Steve Algar, Jerry Scoggins)
- 2015 – Bro Racing (Daniel Walker, Luke Walker, Phillip Large, Tom Griffiths)
- 2016 – David & Co
- 2017 – David & Co
- 2022 – MagnaKarting (Josh Grout, Paul Gaston)

=== Car Trade Challenge ===
Champion

- 2006 – Wrights Mazda Norwich
- 2007 – Team Lind BMW

- 2008 – Wrights Mazda Norwich
- 2009 – Wrights Mazda Norwich

- 2010 – Glover Brothers

=== Junior League ===
Champion

- 2003 – Olly Larkin
- 2004 – Damien Swan
- 2005 – Tom Morfoot
- 2006 – Steven Hindry
- 2007 – Steven Hindry
- 2007 – Chris Long
- 2008 Winter – Jamie Cummings

- 2008 – Jamie Cummings
- 2009 Winter – Kieran Rudrum
- 2009 – Jake Dewbery
- 2010 Winter – Kieran Rudrum
- 2010 – Ryan Cummings
- 2011 Winter – Jak Warner
- 2011 – Harry Holdbrook

- 2012 Winter – Alex Ready
- 2012 – Alex Ready
- 2013 Winter – Jack Tritton
- 2013 – Georgie Whitbread
- 2014 Winter – Thomas Fousler
- 2014 – Jack Tritton
- 2015 Winter – Robert Welham
- 2015 – Robert Welham

=== Cadet League ===
Champion

- 2004 – Tom Morfoot
- 2005 – Tom Sykes
- 2006 – Tom Sykes
- 2007 – Alex Vingoe
- 2008 Winter – Craig Cummings
- 2008 – Jesse Chamberlain

- 2009 Winter – Craig Cummings
- 2009 – Arnold Lincoln
- 2010 Winter – Henry Dixon
- 2010 – Craig Cummings
- 2011 Winter – Craig Cummings

- 2011 – Sam Fitzpatrick
- 2012 Winter – Craig Cummings
- 2012 – Jason Hutton
- 2013 Winter – Jason Hutton
- 2013 – Thomas Foulser

=== Pro-Kart Endurance ===
Champions

- 2001 – Focus
- 2002 – Voodoo
- 2003 – Rivett Motors

- 2004 – Rivett Motors
- 2005 – Sonic Deaf Monkeys
- 2006 – Kart'orse (Carl Eweleit, Ian Sandell)

- 2007 – Rivett Motors (Martyn Rivett, Chris Bond)
- 2009 – Q Racing (Kyle Cumbers, Sean Curtis)

=== Pro-Kart Sprint Series (Formally 'Boat Boys') ===
Champions

- 2008 Winter – Tim Lewis
- 2008 Spring – Pete Mantripp
- 2008 Summer – Rob Mayo
- 2008 Autumn – Simon Francis
- 2008 Overall – Chris Wright
- 2009 Winter – Pete Mantripp
- 2009 Spring – Simon Francis
- 2009 Summer – Jonathan Lewis

- 2009 Winter – Simon Francis
- 2009 Overall – Simon Francis
- 2010 Winter – Darren Houghton
- 2010 Spring – Alex Wright
- 2010 Summer – Jay Austin
- 2010 Winter – Roger Smith
- 2010 Overall – Roger Smith
- 2011 Winter – Shaun Reeve

- 2011 Overall – Shaun Reeve
- 2011 Clubman – Pete Bennett
- 2012 Overall – Shaun Reeve
- 2012 Clubman – Brenden Stockdale
- 2013 Overall – Alex Wright
- 2013 Clubman – Hadleigh Wakefield

== All Stars Julian Durance Memorial Shield ==
The Ellough Park 'All Stars' competition was first set up in 2005 for current and past stars of the open Grand Prix series to compete for a one-off trophy. The inaugural event was won by Matt Bond from pole position. Tony Rumball and Aaron Bessey completed the podium.

The event was originally meant to be held every four years but returned in 2008 and has run every year since then. Matt Bond retained his title in 2008, to date his last appearance at Ellough Park. Steve English had taken pole position ahead of Steve Armstrong but the two drivers collided at turn 1, dropping them to the tail of the field. James Barnes and Andy Horne completed the podium.

For 2009, drivers from other leagues were granted entries for the first time, adding diversity to the field. In atrocious conditions, Steve English picked up his maiden ‘All-Stars’ title. Tony Rumball claimed second, having led most of the final with James Barnes in third. Andy Horne had started on pole but slipped back to tenth at the finish. 2010 saw another new champion in Tony Rumball, who was outstanding in the tricky conditions. Steve English and James Barnes rounded out the podium finishers.

The 'All-Stars' was renamed to 'Julian Durance Memorial Shield' in 2011 in memory of the circuit mechanic and former British Superkart racer who died in late 2010 at the age of 40. The 2011 race was run with a new ranking points system with the number one seed going to James Barnes. The event was won by the 23rd seed Ollie Thorn at his first attempt. Guy Newstead and Luke Dickerson also claimed their first ‘All-Stars’ podium finishes.

2012 produced the most competitive running of the meeting since its inception. Ollie Thorn entered as number one seed but the victory went the way of debutant Alex Ready, who had a run of success throughout the season also claiming the Open Grand Prix and Junior League titles. Chris Trott took the runner-up spot with Craig Pollard third after a spirited fightback when he spun to the tail of the field on lap one.
