= A145 road =

Road in Suffolk, England

Coordinates: 52.3991°N 1.5777°E

A145

Route information
- Length: 11 mi (18 km)

Major junctions
- North end: North Cove (A146)
- A146; B1062 (to Bungay); B1124 (to Halesworth); B1123 (to Halesworth); A12
- South end: Blythburgh (A12)

Location
- Country: United Kingdom
- Constituent country: England

Road network
- Roads in the United Kingdom; Motorways; A and B road zones

The A145 is an A road in the English county of Suffolk. It runs from east of the town of Beccles, close to the border with Norfolk, to the village of Blythburgh where it joins the A12 road. It is around 11 miles (18 km) in length and single carriageway throughout.

== Route description ==
The A145 runs from close to the village of North Cove, just east of Worlingham and Beccles, bypassing both places before passing through a rural area on its route to the A12 at Blythburgh. Until 2018 it ran through the town before a relief road was opened passing around the southern edge of Beccles. At the same time the route was re-designated, the route through the town becoming a 'B' road.

=== Beccles Relief Road section ===
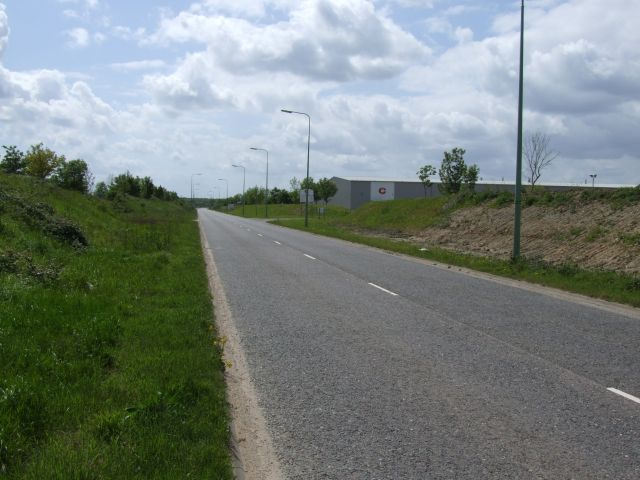
The route through the industrial area at Ellough

Beginning as Copland Way, the A145 has its northernmost point at a roundabout with the A146 road between Worlingham and North Cove to the east of Beccles. It runs southwards for around 0.9 miles (1.4 km) through farmland and an industrial area on the site of the World War II Ellough Airfield. The first section of the route was previously designated the B1127. It meets a roundabout on the south-eastern edge of the industrial area before turning to head west for 2 miles (3.2 km) along the southern edges of Worlingham and Beccles across farmland, bypassing the town. Along this section the road is crossed by Regional Cycle Route 31.

Prior to the opening of the Beccles Southern Relief road in October 2018, the road started on the northern edge Beccles at a roundabout junction with the A146. It passed through the town, splitting to form a one-way system before passing through an industrial area on the southern edge of the town. Before the building of the Beccles northern bypass in the 1980s, the A145 began at the junction of London Road and Blyburgate, with the roads through the town centre being designated as the A146.

The road rejoins its previous route at a roundabout 1.5 miles (2.4 km) south of the town centre where it heads in a southerly direction.

=== Rural section ===
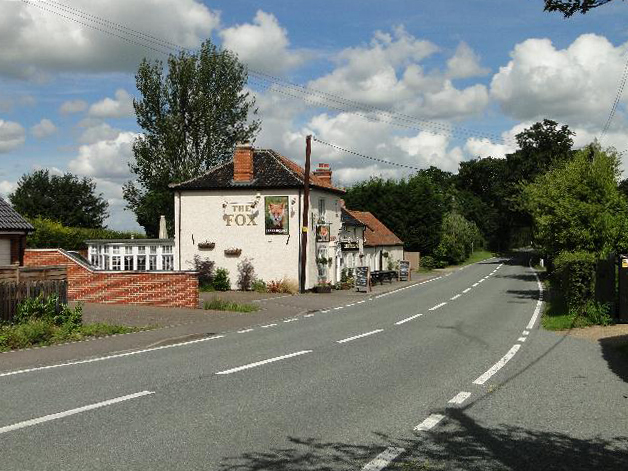
The Shadingfield Fox public house alongside the A145

To the south of Beccles the A145 becomes a rural route. It runs through the parishes of Weston, Willingham St Mary and Shadingfield immediately to the south of the town. In Weston it passes the former Duke of Marlborough public house and close to the Grade II* listed Weston Hall, built in the late 16th century for John Rede, and the 12th century parish church of St Peter which can be seen from the road at the junction with Church Lane. A small section of Willingham St Mary follows before the route reaches Shadingfield where it passes the Shadingfield Fox public house, the village hall and a water tower. The village is linear and extends for around 1 mile (1.6 km); at its southern edge the road passes the Grade I listed medieval church of St John the Baptist and Hill Farmhouse, dating from the 16th century and Grade II* listed.

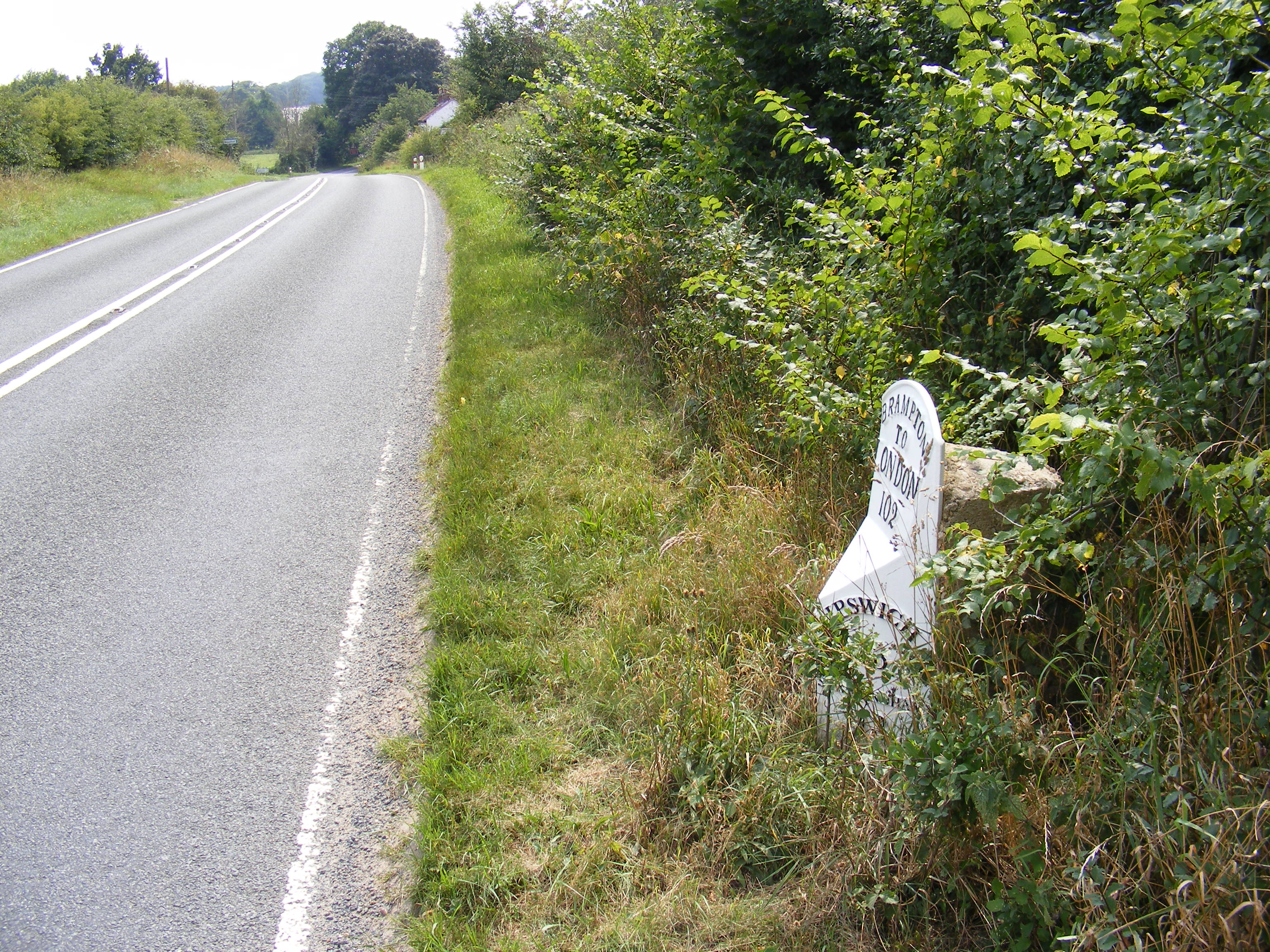
The road at Brampton, with one of the milestones seen alongside it.

South of Shadingfield the A145 passes through the parish of Brampton with Stoven. The village of Brampton is dispersed across a wide area either side of the road. At Brampton crossroads it passes the former Dog public house which closed in 1999 and is now a guesthouse. The crossroads were the site of the original Brampton Primary School and a post office, both of which are now private residences. A cast iron milestone stands at the crossroads alongside the village sign. Dating from 1822, the milestone was discovered and restored in 2010 before being replaced. It indicates that Beccles is 5 miles to the north, Great Yarmouth 19 miles and Norwich 23 miles and that the crossroads are 104 miles from London. A number of similar milestones can be seen along the road in this section. From the crossroads Station Road to the west leads to Brampton railway station, some 2 miles (3.2 km) away, whilst Southwold Road runs eastward, passing Brampton Primary School before heading towards Stoven and Wangford.

The A145 passes the Grade I listed Brampton church, dedicated to St Peter and with a 15th-century tower, before turning sharply and reaching a junction with the B1124 Halesworth road. It continues into the parish of Sotherton, passing the former Cross Bows Inn alongside the road, and then into Wangford with Henham where it passes along the western edge of Henham Park, the site of the Latitude festival, a major music and arts festival held annually in July, and the Grand Henham Steam Rally, held in September. The park was the site of Henham Hall, originally a Tudor house dating from the early 16th century. The original building burned down in 1773 and was replaced with a Georgian mansion in 1790. This was pulled down in 1953. An archaeological dig of the site featured in the Time Team television programme in January 2013.

The road then runs into the parish of Blythburgh where a junction with the B1123 at Bulcamp leads towards Halesworth. The Battle of Bulcamp occurred here in 653 or 654 AD between the forces of Anna of East Anglia and Penda of Mercia. Anna, the King of East Anglia, was defeated and killed along with his son Jurmin. Both are believed to have been buried at Blythburgh Priory. The main A12 road is reached at the southern end of the A145, around 0.4 miles (0.64 km) north of the village of Blythburgh, at a junction overlooking the estuary of the River Blyth.

== Road safety ==
The A145 is generally straight and has no record of significant safety issues. It has generally been rated as medium or low–medium risk in European Road Assessment Programme (EuroRAP) surveys. There were 8 fatalities associated with road traffic accidents along its length between 1999 and 2010. Accidents have occurred at Henham Park, Brampton and Willingham St Mary and Shadingfield. The road is limited to 30 miles per hour for a distance of around 1 mile (1.6 km) in Shadingfield and either side of Brampton crossroads. On the approach to the A12 at Blythburgh a speed limit of 40 mph is applied. Suffolk Constabulary operate mobile speed cameras on the road to enforce speed limits. An off-road cycle lane and footpath is in use alongside the section made up of the Beccles Southern Relief Road, with street lighting on the roundabouts at each end of this stretch. Outside of this there is limited street lighting in place along the road.

The Latitude Festival attracts a significant amount of road traffic and delays around the site at Henham and the junction of the A145 with the A12 are common over the festival weekend. The A145 and other approach roads are generally subject to temporary speed limits, diversions, no stopping orders and one way systems to ease traffic flow. Organisers have attempted to encourage festival goers to use cycle or bus transport to minimise congestion.
