= Beccles bell tower =

Building in Beccles, Suffolk, England

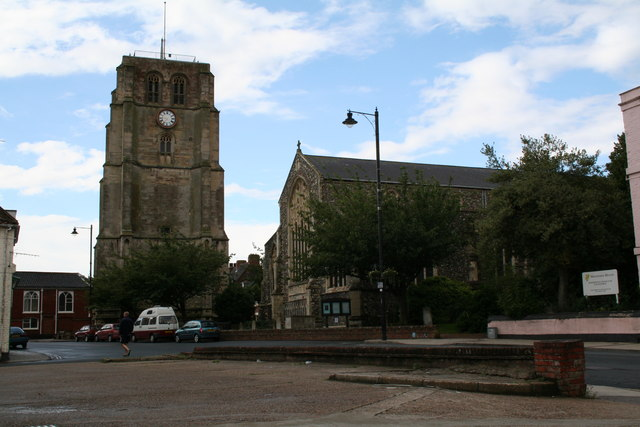
- Interactive map of the Beccles bell tower area

General information
- Architectural style: Perpendicular Gothic
- Location: Beccles, England
- Coordinates: 52.4583°N 1.5625°E
- Construction started: c1500
- Completed: 1540

Listed Building – Grade I
- Official name: Detached tower of Church of St Michael
- Designated: 16 March 1948
- Reference no.: 1298972

Beccles bell tower is a free-standing Grade I listed edifice associated with the adjacent St. Michael's Church in the market town of Beccles, Suffolk, England.

It stands near the edge of a cliff overlooking the River Waveney, the bell tower rises an additional 97 feet (29.6 m) and is thirty feet square (9m) at its base. It dominates the town as well as the surrounding countryside, much of which is comprised by The Broads National Park. Views of the Waveney, the North Sea on the eastern horizon, and the flat terrain of the broads extending south into Suffolk and, across the river, into nearby Norfolk, can be obtained by scaling the 122 steps to the top of the tower.

== History ==
Construction started around 1500, under the direction of the monks of Bury St Edmunds Abbey, the important pilgrimage destination in the nearby town of Bury St. Edmunds. Like the main body of St. Michael's church, the tower is Perpendicular Gothic in style. The tower is supported by deep foundations, very thick walls faced with Roche Abbey stone (so called because of its use in the now-ruined abbey near Maltby, South Yorkshire), and huge buttresses; there is a newelled staircase at each corner of the tower.

It is customary for bell towers (also called campanile) to be built at the western end of a church, the end opposite the altar. However, the site at Beccles, near the edge of a cliff, and the enormous weight of the proposed tower, approximately three thousand tons, dictated that the tower be built to the east of the church as a free-standing structure. Local historians believe that the tower was originally intended to have a steeple and spire but after forty years of construction, the Protestant Reformation during the reign of King Henry VIII (and the suppression of Roman Catholic institutions) intervened to bring work to a halt.

Great skill and care is evident in the tower's construction, particularly in the tracery and the ornamental niches and panels of the stonework. The tower entrance is similar to the south porch (portico) of the church; it features the coats of arms of local families who contributed substantially to the project. These families include the Garneys, the Redes and the Bowes.

The interior of St. Michael's was badly damaged by fire in 1586, but the tower was unaffected.

Early in the 18th century, two clock faces were affixed to the north and south sides of the tower, and, a century later, another was added to the east side and all three were raised to a slightly higher level. According to local legend, a clock face to the west was not added, as either the people of Norfolk would not pay for the clock, or the people of Beccles did not want to give the time to the people of Norfolk for free. At present the clock is run by electricity and controlled by computer, allowing the twice-yearly change between Greenwich Mean Time and British Summer Time to be made automatically. The tower bells sound on each quarter-hour and ring out the time on the hour.

Originally there was a ring of eight bells, but this was replaced, in 1762, by Lester & Pack of Whitechapel Bell Foundry, London, with a ring of ten bells. In 1909 all ten bells were completely restored by John Taylor & Co of Loughborough and re-hung on a new steel frame. The ringing chamber is on the second level of the tower, and the belfry is on the fourth.

One of the most historically significant events associated with this church and bell tower is the wedding, in 1749, of Catherine Suckling and the Reverend Edmund Nelson, the parents of England's seafaring hero, Horatio Nelson, 1st Viscount Nelson.
