= William Clowes Ltd. =

British book printer

William Clowes Ltd. is a British printing company founded in London in 1803 by William Clowes. It grew from a small, one press firm to one of the world's largest printing companies in the mid-19th century. The company merged with Caxton Press, operated by William Moore in Beccles, Suffolk in the late 19th century and concentrated its business in the town following World War II. It is one of the UK's largest manufacturers of directories and reference books and continues to operate out of its large printing factory at Ellough near Beccles as part of the CPI UK group.

== History ==
Clowes established the firm on 21 October 1803 at 20 Villiers Street, London next to the Strand. The company was small in the beginning, having only one printing press and one assistant. Clowes worked for three days and nights to finish his first job, which satisfied the customer. Business soon grew from word of mouth, as customers were impressed with the company's speed and accuracy.

=== Expansion and steam powered presses ===
The company expanded in 1823 with the purchase of Northumberland Court and the installation of its first steam-powered presses (made by Applegath and Cowper). However, the new noisy presses disturbed the Duke of Northumberland, whose palace was nearby, and he ordered the company to cease operation. When Clowes refused, the case was tried in court in June 1824, where the printer won with the help of his attorney John Copley. Clowes agreed to move the presses though in exchange for a sum paid by the Duke. The exchange proved fruitful for Clowes, as the bankruptcy of Archibald Constable caused a short period of bad business that afflicted the London publishing industry and the Duke's compensation helped offset the large losses Clowes experienced during this time.

In 1826, the company purchased and moved to premises on Duke Street (now Duchy Street), Lambeth. This had previously been occupied by Applegath and Cowper. The firm, which was renamed at William Clowes and Sons in 1839, grew rapidly, and by 1843 was one of the largest printing companies in the world: it operated 24 presses and had its own type and stereotype foundries, 2500 tonnes of stereotyped plates (at the time worth at least 500,000 pounds sterling), and a collection of 80,000 woodcuts. In 1847, Clowes died, and three of his sons, William Clowes the younger (1807–1883), Winchester, and George, took over running the company. In 1851, the company secured a large contract to print half a million catalogues for the Great Exhibition. The project involved the use of 50 tonnes of type, 30,000 reams of paper and three tonnes of ink.

=== Merger with Caxton Press ===
In 1873, William Clowes the younger's eldest son, William Archibald Clowes (1843–1904), and his nephew William Charles Knight Clowes (1838–1917) entered a partnership with William Moore, who operated the Caxton Press in Beccles, Suffolk. Although Moore suddenly disappeared, leaving a considerable debt, the firm survived and was re-established as Clowes and Clowes. It grew from operating four presses to 15 in just three years. In 1880, Clowes and Clowes merged with William Clowes & Sons to form William Clowes Ltd.

=== Relocation to Beccles ===
The company continued operating into the 20th century, but suffered a setback during World War II, when the Blitz destroyed its Duke Street offices. Following the war, the firm decided to concentrate on expanding its presses in Beccles. In the late 1970s, computerised phototypesetting was introduced to the company which has continued to invest in digital technology. The company sold its old Beccles premises in 2003 and moved to a new, custom-built factory at Ellough on the outskirts of Beccles in 2004.
