= A146 road =

'A road' in East Anglia, England

A146

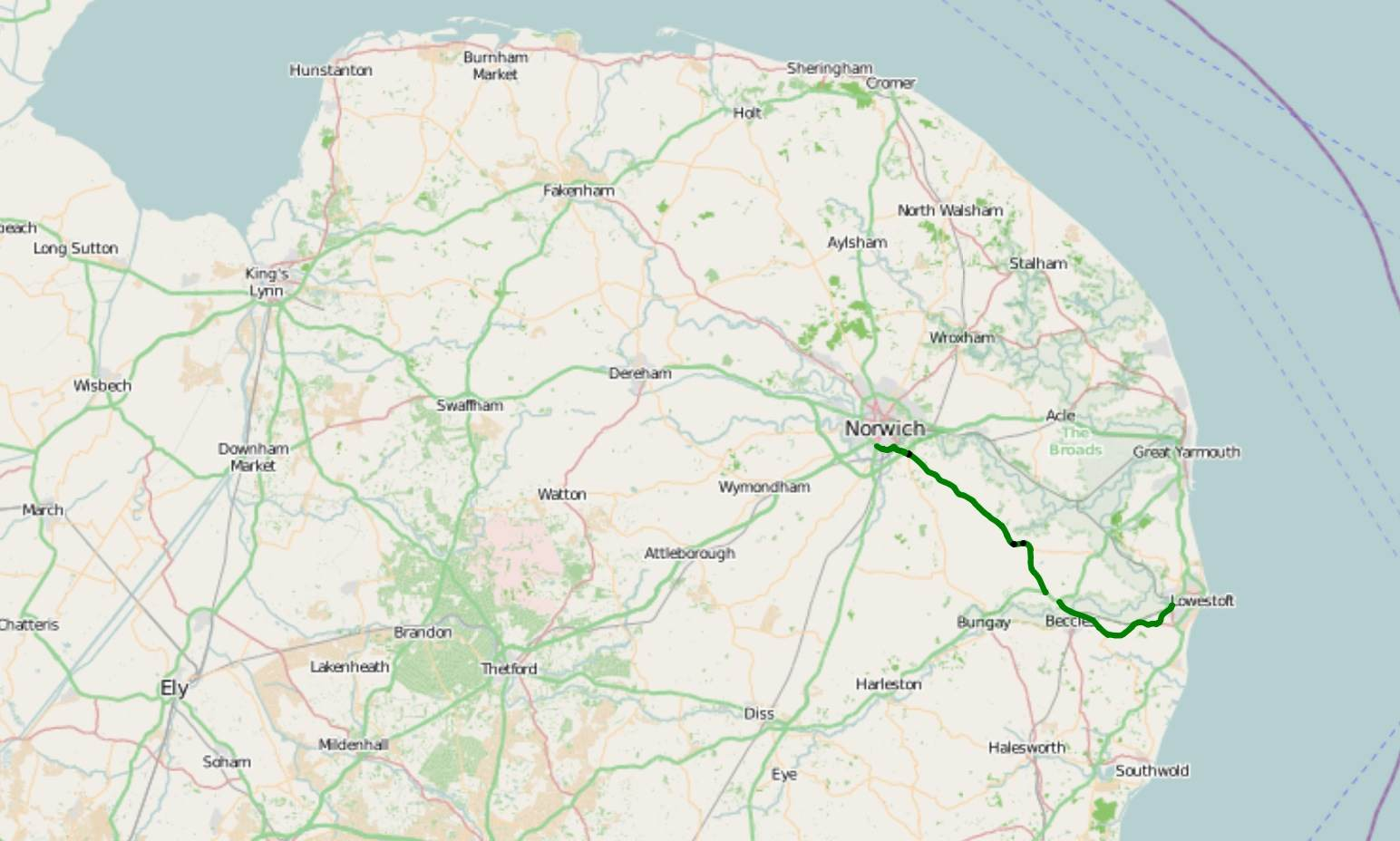
- Click map to enlarge

Route information
- Length: 27 mi (43 km)

Major junctions
- North-west end: Norwich (A140); 52.6127°N 1.2818°E
- A140 A1054; A47; B1332 to Bungay; B1136 to Great Yarmouth A143 A145 A1117
- South-east end: Lowestoft (A1117); 52.4687°N 1.7070°E

Location
- Country: United Kingdom
- Primary destinations: Beccles

Road network
- Roads in the United Kingdom; Motorways; A and B road zones

The A146 is an A road that connects Norwich in Norfolk and Lowestoft in Suffolk, two of East Anglia's largest population centres. It is around 27 miles (43 km) in length and has primary classification along its entire route. It is mainly single carriageway throughout its route, with the exception of a section of dual carriageway on the southern edge of Norwich.

== Route description ==
The A146 begins in Norwich before passing through a mainly rural area on its route to the eastern edge of Lowestoft.

=== Norwich ===
The A146 starts to the south of Norwich city centre as part of the city ring road. It begins at a junction with the A140 Ipswich Road and forms a section of the ring road which is approximately 1.5 miles (2.4 km) long, running to the east where it reaches a junction with the A1054. The A146 then runs south-easterly out of the city, a direction it generally continues in for the rest of its route, initially as a section of dual carriageway around 1 mile (1.6 km) in length, crossing the main Norwich to London railway line and the River Yare and bypassing the village of Trowse. The road passes under the A47 southern bypass with junctions controlled by traffic lights allowing access to and from the A47 and reaches a junction with the B1332, the former northern terminus of the A144.

Before the construction of the southern bypass the A146 began in the centre of Norwich and ran through Trowse.

=== Norwich to Beccles ===
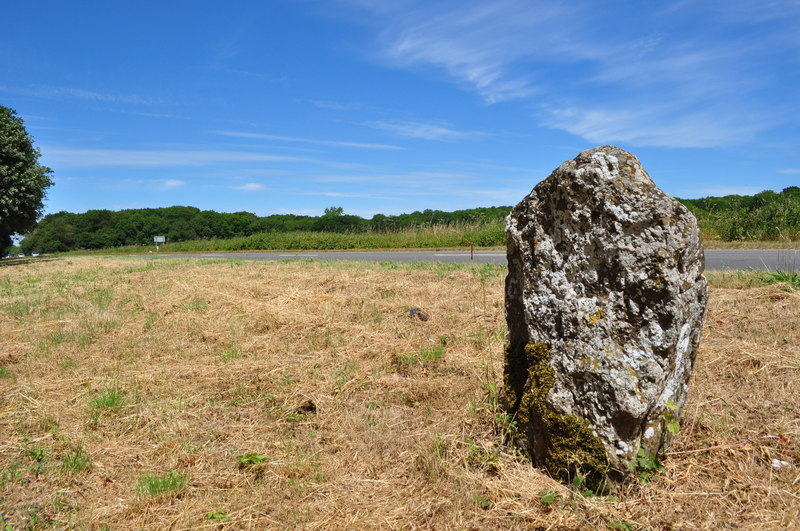
The Stockton Stone with the A146 in the background

After leaving Norwich the A146 returns to a single carriageway and runs through a rural section towards the town of Beccles on the Norfolk-Suffolk border. It passes through the parish of Hellington before reaching the village of Thurton where a 40 mph (64 km/h) speed limit is in force. After passing the grounds of Langley School it then bypasses the village of Chedgrave and the market town of Loddon, crossing the River Chet in the process. The route formerly passed through both of these settlements.

The road then passes the edge of the village of Hales at the roundabout leading to the B1136 for Great Yarmouth. Between Hales and Stockton several old stretches of the route can be seen in what are now laybys. It then reaches the A143 at a roundabout with the route to Bungay going west. The road briefly becomes the A143 for around 1 mile (1.6 km) before another roundabout on the northern edge of Gillingham where the A143 continues to the north-east towards Great Yarmouth. A service station and fast food restaurant are located at this junction.

The road then bypasses Gillingham and crosses the River Waveney, passing into Suffolk, before reaching the northern edge of the market town of Beccles at a roundabout. It formerly passed through Gillingham and crossed the Waveney at the narrow Beccles Old Bridge before passing through the town and Worlingham to the east.

=== Beccles to Lowestoft ===
The road passes to the north of Beccles and crosses the Lowestoft to Ipswich railway line at a level crossing. It passes Beccles Common and to the north of Worlingham, travelling now in a more easterly direction before rejoining its original route near the villages of North Cove, where there is a roundabout junction with the A145, and Barnby. Both villages are bypassed to the south by the modern road before it reaches the edge of the Lowestoft built up area at Carlton Colville. A relief road, the A1145, links Carlton Colville with the centre of Lowestoft whilst the A146 continues east.

The road terminates at a junction with the A1117 in Oulton Broad, just to the south of Oulton Broad South railway station. The road previously ended at a junction with the A12 in the centre of Lowestoft.

== History ==
The A146 formerly started in Norwich city centre and ran into the centre of Lowestoft. A range of improvements, including straightening of bends, have taken place over the years. Chedgrave and Loddon were bypassed in the 1970s. Beccles, Worlingham and Gillingham are also bypassed with the River Waveney crossed by Beccles New Bridge, replacing a 19th-century iron bridge which traffic used to have to cross in Beccles. The completion of the A47 Norwich southern bypass in 1992 created the dual carriageway section of the A146 on the edge of the city and bypassed the village of Trowse.

The A146 historically ran from Oulton Broad into the centre of Lowestoft along the route of what is today the B1531. The route ran to the south of Lake Lothing and terminated just to the south of the bascule bridge at a junction with the A12 immediately to the south of the entrance to the Port of Lowestoft.

In 2018 a roundabout was built to replace the Hales junction of the B1136 for Great Yarmouth. In 2020 a roundabout was built at Loddon, replacing the staggered crossroads that linked the A146 with Mundham Road and George Lane.

== Transport links ==
The route of the A146 passes near to Norwich railway station on the Great Eastern Main Line and both Beccles railway station and Oulton Broad South railway station on the East Suffolk Line. All stations are operated by Greater Anglia.

The First Norfolk & Suffolk X2, X21 and X22 bus routes also use the road for much of the journey between Norwich and Lowestoft, with the X21 and X22 serving all population centres on the route, and the X2 bypassing Loddon.
