= Promens =

Icelandic holding company

- Company type: Private limited company
- Industry: Plastics manufacturing, packaging
- Founded: 1984
- Headquarters: Kópavogur, Iceland
- Key people: Jakob Sigurðsson, President and CEO
- Products: Personal and Healthcare packaging, Food and Beverage packaging, Chemical packaging, Components for automotive and electric industries, Insulated double walled Sæplast containers, IBC´s and more
- Website: www.promens.com

Promens hf is an Icelandic holding company with primary interests in rigid plastics manufacturing.

It is majority owned by Icelandic investment companies Horn Invest and The Enterprise Investment Fund. Promens' headquarters are in Kópavogur, Iceland. It has main business operations in Iceland and India.

Promens operates 42 manufacturing in 19 countries, with 3800 employees, and total sales exceeding EUR 611 million in 2011.

Promens traces its roots back to 1984 when a group of local investors in Dalvik, Iceland, established a company called Sæplast to manufacture insulated, double walled containers for the fishing and fish processing industries. After extensive adoption by the Icelandic fisheries industry, the company began exporting its products worldwide. In 1993, Sæplast won the President of Iceland's Export Award. The same year Sæplast was listed on the Icelandic Stock Exchange.

During 1999–2000 Sæplast acquired three companies abroad; in 1999 the Dyno AS factories in Ålesund, Norway and St. John, Canada, and in 2000, Nordic Supplies Container AS of Norway.

This expanded Sæplast's product range from rotationally molded tubs to include floats and safety equipment for the marine industries. As a result of these acquisitions, Sæplast's turnover increased by 400%, with 40% of the company's turnover now coming from the floats and safety equipment. During this time, the number of overseas employees reached three times the personnel in Iceland.

In 2001 Sæplast Asia was established in Hong Kong. In 2002, Icebox Plastico, Spain was acquired by Sæplast, and in 2003 Plasti-Ned of the Netherlands was also acquired by Sæplast.

Atorka Group of Iceland purchased a majority interest in Sæplast in 2004 and delisted the company from the ICEX. In 2004 the largest Icelandic company in the field of expandable polystyrene production, Tempra hf was acquired by Sæplast.

In May 2005, Promens hf was formed to take over several of Sæplast's subsidiaries: Sæplast Dalvík ehf, and Tempra hf. in Iceland, Plasti-Ned BV and Sæplast Holland BV. in the Netherlands, Sæplast Iberia S.A. in Spain, Sæplast Asia Ltd. in Hong Kong and Sæplast UK Ltd., a 63% share in Sæplast India Ltd. Sæplast Ålesund AS., Sæplast Norge AS. and Sæplast Canada Inc. remained under Sæplast hf.

In July 2005 the company acquired, the Bonar Plastics division from Low and Bonar Plc, adding eleven rotomolding plants in ten countries within Europe and in North America. Sixty-five percent of the sales of Bonar Plastics is derived from custom moulded products manufactured for other producers of industrial products.

At the time of the acquisition Bonar Plastics produced parts for at least 15 industries and blue-chip customers include DaimlerChrysler, Caterpillar, John Deere, Peugeot, Renault and Volvo. At the time 35% of its sales were its own products, particularly tubs and tanks for storage and transportation of materials for the chemical, pharmaceutical and food industries.

== Divisions ==
Promens Plastics division operates 11 rotomoulding factories in eight countries. The division's factories are located in Dalvik in Iceland, Hockenheim in Germany, Deventer and Rijen in the Netherlands, Miedzyrzecz in Poland, Annezin, Bellignat, Blye, Geovreisset, L'Aigle, La Roche-sur-Foron and Montoir in France, Barcelona in Spain, Saint John in New Brunswick Canada, one plant in India and one plant in Taicang, China.

In 2016 January Promens and saeplast acquired by a UK based company called RPC and the business operations at India and china closed down
