= Beccles Airfield =

Aerodrome in Suffolk, England

Beccles Airfield Beccles Aerodrome
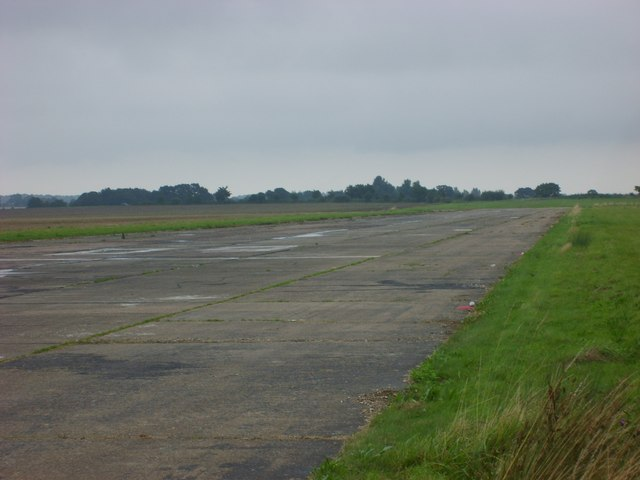
- IATA: none; ICAO: EGSM

Summary
- Airport type: Private
- Operator: Rain Air
- Location: Beccles
- Elevation AMSL: 80 ft / 24 m
- Coordinates: 52°26′07″N 001°37′06″E

Map
- Location in Suffolk

Runways
Direction	Length		Surface
Direction	m	ft	Surface
09/27	696	2,283	Concrete/grass
- Sources: UK AIP at NATS

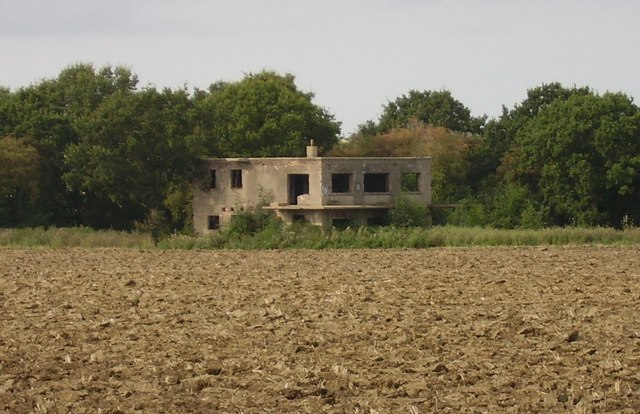
Control tower / watch office, RAF Beccles

Beccles Airfield, also known as Beccles Airport or Beccles Aerodrome (ICAO: EGSM), is located 2 NM (3.7 km; 2.3 mi) southeast of Beccles in the county of Suffolk, England. Built during the Second World War, it has operated as a heliport servicing the North Sea oil and gas industry and currently operates as a base for private flights, flight training and parachuting.

Beccles Aerodrome has a CAA Ordinary Licence (Number P837) that allows flights for the public transport of passengers or for flying instruction as authorised by the licensee (RainAir (Beccles) Limited). The aerodrome is not licensed for night use. The current airstrip consists of around 450 metres (1,480 ft) of the original wartime concrete surface with 150 metres (490 ft) of grass airstrip.

== Origin and wartime use ==
Always known locally as Ellough Airfield, Beccles Airfield was built under the direction of London construction company Holland, Hannen & Cubitts for the United States Army Air Forces (USAAF) and completed in August 1942. It used the three concrete runway layout typical of many bomber airfields in East Anglia, known as Class A layout, and was built for the 8th Air Force and allocated airfield number 132. It is possible that Ellough was intended to be used by the 3d Air Division, 95th Combat Bombardment Wing. The 95th had two Bombardment Groups, the 489th at RAF Halesworth and the 491st at RAF Metfield. Other combat wings had three Bomber Groups.

The airfield was the last to be completed in Suffolk during the war and the USAAF had no use for the airfield so it passed briefly to RAF Bomber Command before being operated by No. 16 Group RAF, RAF Coastal Command from August 1944. The field was used as an air-sea rescue post until closure in 1945, and saw operation by various RAF and FAA squadrons operating such diverse types as Vickers Warwick, Fairey Barracuda, Supermarine Walrus, Fairey Swordfish, Supermarine Sea Otter and Fairey Albacore on air-sea rescue and anti-shipping duties. The Fleet Air Arm used temporary lodging facilities at RAF Beccles under the stone frigate name HMS Hornbill II. (Note: Not to be confused with HMS Hornbill, which is a completely different establishment in Oxfordshire)

One of Ellough's few claims to fame is that in 1943 it was used by de Havilland Mosquitos of 618 Squadron to practise dropping spinning bombs called 'Highball' which were a derivative of the bouncing bombs used by 617 "Dambuster" Squadron to breach dams in Germany in May 1943. The use of 'Highball' is shown in the 1970 film Mosquito Squadron. In an interview late in his life, Captain (N) "Winkle" Brown, the first person to land a Mosquito on an aircraft carrier, recalls visiting the airfield to demonstrate deck landing skills to RAF personnel there. In the course of his visit, he encountered Barnes Wallis, designer of the bouncing bombs.

The wartime control tower was demolished in 2009. The airfield was the most easterly wartime airfield in England.

=== Units ===
The site was used by different units:

- No. 15 (RAAF) Air Crew Holding Unit
- No. 278 Squadron RAF
- No. 279 Squadron RAF
- No. 280 Squadron RAF
- No. 618 Squadron RAF
- 810 Naval Air Squadron
- 827 Naval Air Squadron

== Post-war use ==
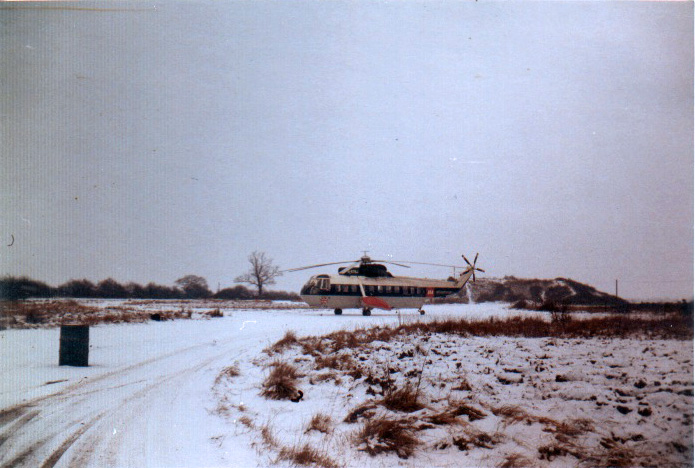
A Sikorsky S-61N at the BEA Helicopters base, Ellough, 1966

After the war the airfield remained dormant until 1965 when BEA Helicopters moved in to the hangars at the eastern end, serving North Sea oil and gas rigs with Sikorsky S-61 helicopters. Helicopter operations were transferred to Norwich International Airport in the 1990s. The airfield has been home to RainAir since 1997 when Rainer Forster transferred his flight training operations from Swanton Morley. The airfield is the base for No. 28 (Suffolk) Civil Air Patrol Unit, a volunteer organisation which aims to aid the emergency services. UK Parachuting carry out free-fall parachute training from the airfield, Virage Helicopter Academy conduct Helicopter training and Mid Anglia Microlights carry out Microlight flying training in both 3-axis (fixed wing) and weightshift machines. Since early 2016 Skylark Radio Control Flyers have been authorised to fly their models at the airfield operating from the concrete runway 09/27 in close cooperation with Rain Air operations.

== Other uses ==
Most of the runways have been broken up and much of the area of the airfield is now used for a variety of industrial uses. Beccles printing company William Clowes Ltd. moved their main factory to the site in 2004. Plastics company Promens operates a warehouse on the park which has the UK's largest solar roof installation with a generating capacity of 1.65MW. Large solar farms are located at the west and south points of the airfield.

Other areas of the site are used for agricultural use and as a site for a farmers market. A kart circuit, Ellough Park Raceway, also occupies part of the airfield site.
