= Sir John Leman High School =

Academy in Beccles, Suffolk, England

Location
- Ringsfield Road; Beccles, Suffolk, NR34 9PG; England; 52°27′02″N 1°33′30″E

Information
- Type: Academy
- Motto: Achievement For All & Also: Disce aut Discede (Roughly Learn or Leave)
- Established: 1631; 395 years ago
- Department for Education URN: 137055 Tables
- Headteacher: Sarah Hartshorn
- Gender: Coeducational
- Age: 11 to 18
- Enrolment: c. 1,680 pupils
- Houses: David Attenborough, Boudicca, Tim Peake, Dorothy Hodgkin, Stephen Hawking
- Colours: Blue and black
- Publication: The Dolphin
- Website: http://www.sirjohnleman.co.uk

Sir John Leman High School is a coeducational 11–18 secondary school with academy status serving part of the Waveney region in north Suffolk, England. The school is located on the western edge of the town of Beccles and serves the surrounding area, including Worlingham. Pupils from Norfolk villages such as Gillingham and Broome also sometimes attend the school. The school has approximately 1,400 pupils, including a sixth form of around 260 students.

== History ==
The school was established when locally-born merchant Sir John Leman left money in his will of 1631 which, after his death on 6 March 1632, provided for the education of 44 pupils from Beccles, two from Ringsfield and two from Gillingham. In 1914 it became the County Mixed Grammar School on its present site in Ringsfield Road. The old school has been converted into the Beccles Museum. In 1971 the school became a comprehensive high school and grew in size. In recent years building work has gone on to expand the school.

Until September 2012 the school only took 13- to 18-year-olds. Due to the reorganisation of schools in Suffolk, it now takes 11- to 18-year-olds. Years 7 and 8 temporarily went to the Lower School site on Castle Hill, previously the Beccles Middle School site. This site was occupied by the Beccles Free School in 2014 when it moved from Carlton Colville.

== Ofsted reports ==
In the Ofsted inspection report dated February 2006, it was rated as a 'good' school with a 'good' sixth form. In February 2009 it was again rated as a generally 'good' school, although with some features which were judged 'satisfactory'. The sixth form provision was judged as achieving an overall effectiveness of 'satisfactory', although post-16 curriculum provision was judged 'good'. The school's subsequent inspection reports again graded it as 'good' overall in October 2011 and October 2016.

== Academic performance ==
The school's 2016 GCSE results were overall above average for England with a Progress 8 score of +0.32. 65% of students achieved grades A*-C in GCSE English and Maths. The 2016 A-Level results were in line with the national average, with a progress score of +0.05 and an average grade of C.

== Notable former pupils ==
- Joseph Arnold, naval surgeon and naturalist
- Joan Crowfoot Payne, archaeologist and sister of Dorothy Hodgkin
- Dorothy Hodgkin, who won the Nobel prize in Chemistry entered the school in 1921 before studying chemistry at Somerville College, Oxford.
- Lin Homer (born 4 March 1957) British Civil Servant, Chief Executive HM Revenue & Customs.
- Sir Francis Avery Jones, eminent gasteroenterologist
- Chris Martin, striker for Bristol Rovers
- Sir John Mills, actor
- Sir Stanley Rous, the 6th President of FIFA and secretary of the Football Association attended Sir John Leman school in the period before the First World War.
- Jennifer Westwood, author, broadcaster and folklorist

== Charity work ==
Sir John Leman High School is known for many sponsors from charities, such as Cancer Research UK, East Anglian Air Ambulance,Beccles Rotary Charitable Trust and the universal Comic Relief. Sir John Leman High School also does events, such as Leman For Life and many other fundraisers.
