= Beccles =

Town in Suffolk, England

Coordinates: 52.458°N 1.563°E

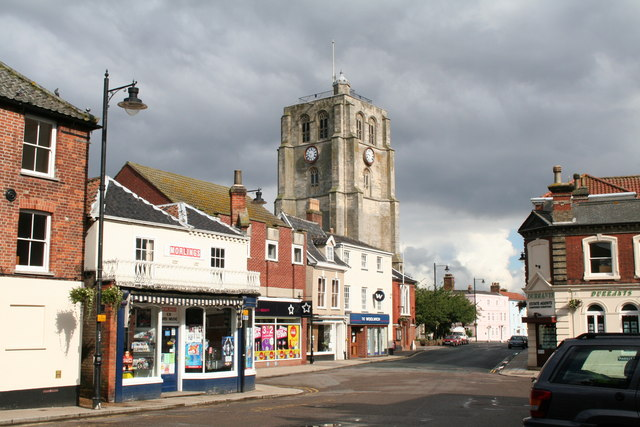
- St. Michael's Church

- Location within Suffolk
- Area: 8 km^{2} (3.1 sq mi)
- Population: 10,069 (2021)
  - Density: 1,259/km^{2} (3,260/sq mi)
- OS grid reference: TM422904
- Civil parish: Beccles
- District: East Suffolk
- Shire county: Suffolk
- Region: East
- Country: England
- Sovereign state: United Kingdom
- Post town: Beccles
- Postcode district: NR34
- Dialling code: 01502
- Police: Suffolk
- Fire: Suffolk
- Ambulance: East of England
- UK Parliament: Lowestoft
- Website: http://www.beccles.info/towncouncil/

Beccles (/ˈbɛkəlz/ BEK-əlz) is a market town and civil parish in the East Suffolk district, in the county of Suffolk, England. The town is located along the A145 and A12 roads, situated 16 miles (26 km) south-east of Norwich and 33 miles (53 km) north-northeast of Ipswich. Nearby towns include Lowestoft to the east and Great Yarmouth to the north-east. The town lies on the River Waveney on the edge of The Broads National Park.

It had a population at the 2021 census of 10,069. Beccles is twinned with Petit-Couronne in France, and has been since 1978.

== History ==
The place-name 'Beccles' is first attested in the Domesday Book of 1086, where it appears as 'Becles', located in the ancient hundred of Wangford. It appears as 'Beacles' circa 1095 in a document from Bury St Edmunds Abbey, and as 'Beclis' in 1157 and 'Becclis' in 1158 in the Pipe Rolls. The name is probably from the Old English bec-laes meaning 'pasture on the stream', cognate with the German word Bach meaning 'stream', and the English word lea meaning 'meadow'.

Once a flourishing Anglian riverport, Beccles lies in the Waveney valley and is a popular boating centre.

The town was first granted its Charter on 2 July 1584 by Elizabeth I, under the name of the Corporation of Beccles Fen. This was subsequently confirmed by James I on 19 May 1605.

John Leman (died 1632) was a tradesman from Beccles who became Lord Mayor of London.

Long associated with Beccles (including recent mayors) is the Peck family. Among those Pecks who have made a place in history is the Rev. Robert Peck, described by Blomfield in his history of Norfolk as a man with a 'violent schismatic spirit' who led a movement within the church of St Andrew's in nearby Hingham, Norfolk, in opposition to the established Anglicanism of the day. The Puritan Peck was eventually forced to flee to Hingham, Massachusetts, founded by many members of his parish, where he resided for several years, until King Charles I had been executed and Oliver Cromwell had taken the reins of government. Robert Peck then elected to return to Hingham, Norfolk, and resumed as rector of St Andrew's Church. He died in Hingham but left descendants in America, including his brother Joseph Peck, who settled in Rehoboth, Massachusetts. Robert's daughter Ann Peck (16 November 1619 – 30 June 1672) also remained in Massachusetts, and married John Mason, who led colonial forces in the Pequot War.

In 1794, French émigré François-René de Chateaubriand worked in Beccles as a French teacher. While there, he fell in love with Charlotte Ives, daughter of a clergyman who lived in nearby Bungay.

Under the Municipal Corporations Act 1835 the borough was reformed. It became part of the administrative county of East Suffolk in 1889. The district contained the parish of Beccles. On 1 April 1974 the district and parish were abolished and became part of Waveney district in the non-metropolitan county of Suffolk. A successor parish was formed covering the same area as the former district and its parish. The successor civil parish has adopted town status.

== Demographics ==
At the 2021 census, Beccles civil parish had a population of 10,069 people in 4,716 households. The Office for National Statistics (ONS) defined a contiguous built-up area (BUA) for the town, excluding outlying parts of the parish, with a population of 9,810 in 2021. Following the 2011 census, ONS defined a larger BUA consisting of Beccles and the adjacent suburb of Worlingham, which had a combined population is 13,868.

Census population of Beccles parish
Census	Population	Female	Male	Households	Source
2001	9,746	5,102	4,644	4,349	
2011	10,123	5,301	4,822	4,602	
2021	10,069	5,255	4,814	4,716	

== Landmarks ==
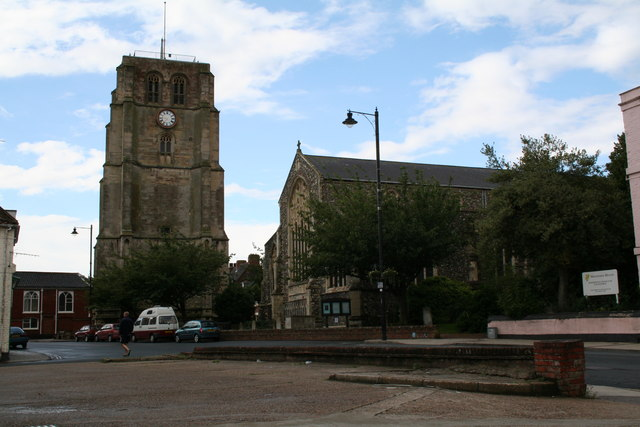
St Michael's Church and the Beccles bell tower

Many of the streets in the town centre have the suffix 'gate', for example, Ballygate, Smallgate and Blyburgate. This is derived from the Old Norse for 'street' and is similar to the modern Danish word gade.

The townscape is dominated by the detached 16th-century Beccles bell tower of St Michael's Church. Like the main body of the church, the tower is Perpendicular Gothic in style and is 97 feet (30 m) tall. The church was built in the 14th century but was rebuilt after being badly damaged by fire in 1586. It has a 13th-century octagonal baptismal font and 14th-century south porch. Both the church and the tower are grade I listed buildings.

Catherine Suckling married the Reverend Edmund Nelson, a former curate of Beccles, at the church in 1749. Their son, the naval hero Horatio Nelson, was born in 1758 in Norfolk. The Suffolk poet George Crabbe married Sarah Elmy at the church in the 18th century.

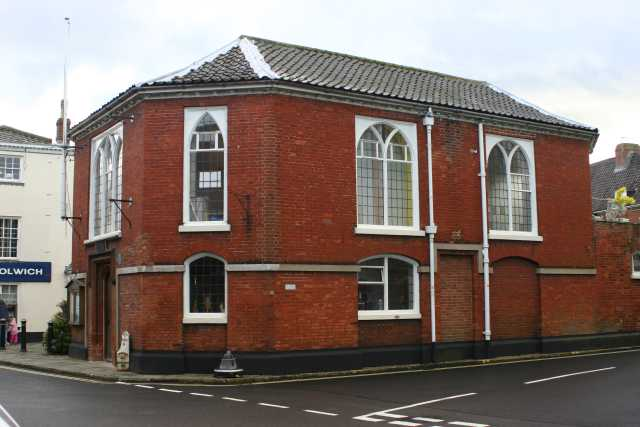
Beccles Town Hall

Opposite the church is Beccles Town Hall, built on the site of the town's market cross. This is at the centre of the Newmarket area, which still features a weekly market.

Beccles Museum is housed in Leman House, a grade I listed building to the south of the town centre on Ballygate. The building dates from the 16th century and was the original site of the town's Grammar School, named after John Leman who endowed it following his death in 1631.

Beccles Common is an area of common land, to the north west of the town. In the centre of Beccles Common sits a World War Two era pillbox built in 1940 or 1941. The area hosts Boney's Island, a man-made mound on the common. The name comes from Bonaparte. There are two different sources of the name Boney's Island. The more popular origin is that it was a prisoner-of-war camp during the Napoleonic Wars. The less popular origin is that a large bonfire was lit on the island to celebrate the end of the Napoleonic wars in 1814.

The old Corn Exchange in Exchange Square, which dates from the early 19th century, now accommodates a branch of Lloyds Bank.

== Transport ==
=== Buses ===
Bus services in the area are operated predominantly by First Eastern Counties and Borderbus; routes link the town with Norwich, Lowestoft, Great Yarmouth, Bungay and Southwold, along with surrounding villages.

=== Railway ===
The town is served by Beccles railway station on the East Suffolk Line between Ipswich and Lowestoft. Services run hourly in each direction on weekdays, following the completion of the Beccles rail loop in 2012; the disused island platform was rebuilt and the track relaid to allow trains to pass, the only point north of Halesworth where this is possible. Services are operated by Greater Anglia.

The town was formerly the southern terminus of the Yarmouth to Beccles Line, which ran across the River Waveney marshes to Great Yarmouth and the eastern terminus of the Waveney Valley Line, linking to the Great Eastern Main Line at Tivetshall in Norfolk. Both lines closed, in 1954 and 1966 respectively; the latter as a result of the Beeching Cuts.

=== Air ===
Beccles Airfield is located at Ellough, around 3 miles (4.8 km) south-east of the town. Originally built in 1942 as a wartime airfield, it was used as a heliport servicing the North Sea petrochemical industry and is now a base for light aircraft and parachuting.

=== Cycling ===
National Cycle Route 1, which runs from London to the Orkney Islands, passes through Beccles. Regional Route 30, which runs between Wells-next-the-Sea and Brandon, and Regional Route 31, from Reedham Ferry to Southwold, also pass through the town.

=== Roads ===
The town is by-passed to the north by the A146 road between Norwich in Norfolk and Lowestoft in Suffolk. The by-pass was built in the 1980s and the main road previously ran through the town, crossing the River Waveney at the narrow Beccles bridge. The link road between the A146 and the town is George Westwood Way, in memory of a Deputy Mayor, George Lionel Westwood, who fought hard for the construction of the by-pass.

The A145 used to run from the A146 through the town centre to link with the A12 at Blythburgh, 11 miles (18 km) to the south of Beccles. The official route of the road now runs via the Beccles Southern Relief Road to indicate to drivers, particularly those of HGVs, that they can avoid the town; this is intended to make the relief road effective in keeping unnecessary traffic out of the town.

==== Beccles Southern Relief Road ====
In 2006, a southern relief road for Beccles was approved, running from a roundabout just south of the town towards Ellough where the A145 connects with an industrial area, before joining with the A146 at North Cove. The completion cost was around £7.0 million and the road forms part of Suffolk County Council traffic management plans. It allows north–south industrial traffic to by-pass the narrow streets of the town centre, reducing congestion and increasing safety and officially opened on 25 September 2018.

== Education ==
Beccles is served by Sir John Leman High School (age 11–18) and SET Beccles School (11–16) for secondary education, both of which admit children from the town and the surrounding area, including from primary schools in Norfolk. Until 2012 a middle school system operated in the town, with most children moving to middle school at age 9 and on to high school at age 13. The Sir John Leman High School dates from 1632 when it was established in the town after the death of John Leman. It was a grammar school between 1914 and 1971.

Three primary schools operate in Beccles providing education from age 5 to 11: Beccles Primary Academy (formerly Crowfoot Primary School); St Benet's Catholic Primary School; and The Albert Pye School which is federated with Ravensmere Infants School (5–8). Children from the town also attend primary school in Worlingham as well as surrounding villages.

== Leisure ==
The annual Beccles Carnival and Family Fun weekend is held during the third weekend in August, which includes the popular Duck Race on the River Waveney.

The town's local newspaper is the weekly Beccles & Bungay Journal, formed in 1933 and now published by Archant.

Two Scout Association groups, 2nd Beccles and 5th Beccles, operate in the town, as do Girlguiding groups. Beccles Sea Cadets and Beccles Royal Marines Cadets run Training Ship Brave and the town is also home to 759 (Beccles) Air Cadets.

Beccles Cricket Club, founded in 1955, play on Beef Meadow on Beccles Common. They run two senior men's teams - the 1st team play in Division Two of the Norfolk Cricket Alliance and the 2nd team play in Division Six. They also run a women's softball team and junior teams from the under-11 age group through to under-15.

Beccles' main football club is Beccles Town, established in 1919. As of the 2023–24 season, they are members of the Anglian Combination Premier Division. Beccles also has a football team called Beccles Caxton, with "Caxton" being a name commonly found in Beccles, including the Caxton Club social club, the Caxton Arms pub and Caxton Road.

Ellough Park Raceway is south-east of Beccles on the site of the old Ellough airfield. It is a local centre for kart racing.

== Notable people ==
- Claude Auchinleck, general in India and North Africa during the Second World War
- Martin Bell, retired BBC journalist and newsreader
- Tim Buck, General Secretary of the Communist Party of Canada between 1929 and 1962
- Hester Burton, author of children's historical fiction, whose father served as Mayor three times
- Jordan Catchpole, British Paralympic swimmer. He won gold at the 2020 Summer Paralympics
- Grantly Dick-Read (1890-1959), obstetrician and a leading advocate of natural childbirth
- William Ellard, swimmer
- William Fiske, goalkeeper for Blackpool
- David Frost, broadcaster
- Charles Hartley, educationist and the Principal of Royal College, Colombo
- Dorothy Hodgkin, Nobel Prize winner
- Chris Martin, forward for Bristol City F.C.
- William Aldis Wright, writer, editor and philologist

== Arms ==
Coat of arms of Beccles

Notes
Granted 23 February 1956.
Crest
In front of a clump of rushes Proper issuant therefrom a demi lion Azure a dolphin Argent.
Torse
A wreath of the colours.
Escutcheon
Azure a bend wavy between two Ancient crowns each enfiling two arrows in saltire points downwards all Or.
Supporters
On the dexter side a dragon wings inverted and addorsed Gules gorged with a mural crown and supporting a staff Or flying therefrom a banner Argent charged with a Cross pommée Gules and on the sinister side a like dragon Or gorged with a mural crown Gules and supporting a staff Or flying therefrom a banner also Gules charged with two keys in saltire Or.
Motto
Prosperity Through Fidelity

== See also ==
- Beccles Airport
- Alan of Beccles
