= Amara Thornton =

American historian

- Occupation: Archaeologist

Academic background
- Education: University College London

Amara Thornton is a historian of archaeology. Her work focuses on British archaeologists in the Middle East and Eastern Mediterranean during the late 19th and early 20th centuries. She situates archaeology within its broader historical context, including the history of tourism, the history of publishing and popular media, the history of education, government policies and women's history. She is an Honorary Research Associate at UCL.

== Early life and education ==
Thornton studied for a MA in Museum Studies at University College of London.

== Career ==
She received a PhD from UCL in 2011 with a thesis entitled 'British archaeologists, social networks and the emergence of a profession', which explored the networks and lives of the archaeologists George Horsfield and Agnes Conway Horsfield; John Crowfoot and Grace Mary ‘Molly’ Crowfoot and John Garstang. In 2012, she received an honorary mention for the Leigh Douglas Memorial Prize of the British Society for Middle Eastern Studies, an annual award for the best Social Sciences or Humanities PhD dissertation on a Middle Eastern topic in Britain.

From 2013 to 2016 she held a British Academy postdoctoral research fellowship at UCL, from which she produced the book Archaeologists in Print: Publishing for the People. This has been described as "a highly readable and detailed exploration of the institutional networks of archaeological knowledge production" and "a refreshing new perspective on the history of archaeology and how it reached the public".

Thornton is a Principal Investigator of a collaborative research and digitisation project, Filming Antiquity. She held a Council for British Research in the Levant Centenary Award in 2018 to create a digital resource of the diary of George Horsfield and Agnes Conway from the 1929 excavations at Petra. From 2019 to 2020 Thornton was a Research Officer at the Ure Museum of Greek Archaeology, University of Reading.

Thornton was featured in the TrowelBlazers Raising Horizons exhibition alongside Margaret Murray. She was elected as a Fellow of the Society of Antiquaries in 2015.

== Selected publications ==
- 2011. The Allure of Archaeology: Agnes Conway and Jane Harrison at Newnham College, 1903–1907. Bulletin of the History of Archaeology 21(1).
- 2012. Tents, Tours, and Treks: Archaeologists, Antiquities Services, and Tourism in Mandate Palestine and Transjordan. Public Archaeology 11(4): 195-216 https://doi.org/10.1179/1465518713Z.00000000020
- 2014. The nobody: Exploring archaeological identity with George Horsfield (1882–1956). Archaeology International.
- 2015. Exhibition Season: Annual Archaeological Exhibitions in London, 1880s-1930s. Bulletin of the History of Archaeology 25.
- 2015. Social Networks in the History of Archaeology: Placing Archaeology in its context. In: Gisela Eberhardt and Fabian Link (Eds.), Historiographical Approaches to Past Archaeological Research. Berlin: Edition Topoi: 69–94.
- 2016. The digital makes visible the invisible. In P. de Montfort and R. E. Calvert, Still Invisible? Conversation Piece, British Art Studies 2.
- 2018. Archaeologists in Print: Publishing for the People. London: UCL Press.
