= Clara Brink Shoemaker =

Crystallographer

Clara Brink Shoemaker (20 June 1921 in Rolde - 30 September 2009) was a Dutch-born American crystallographer and a senior research professor at Oregon State University. As a postdoctoral researcher, she worked on the structure determination of vitamin B12 in the group of Dorothy Hodgkin. Together with her husband, David Shoemaker, she contributed to the research on transition metal phases and intermetallic compounds. They were the first to recognize that interstices in tetrahedrally close-packed metal crystals are exclusively tetrahedral and only have four types of coordination polyhedra.

== Life ==
In 1941, Shoemaker completed her undergraduate degree at the University of Leiden which was closed shortly after due to the Nazi occupation. She then started her graduate studies at the University of Utrecht where she studied under Anton Eduard van Arkel. At the end of the World War II, she completed her doctoral examination. Afterwards, Shoemaker assumed an assistantship at the University of Utrecht and she learned the techniques of X-ray crystallography under the renowned crystallographer Caroline MacGillavry. In 1950, Shoemaker received her PhD from the University of Utrecht and was hired by Anton Eduard van Arkel as an X-ray crystallographer at the University of Leiden. During this time, her research focused on crystal structures of monovalent ions. Starting later in 1950, she worked on the crystal structure of vitamin B12 in Dorothy Hodgkin's laboratory in Oxford for one year. This resulted in three publications co-authored with Hodgkin. The stay was funded by an International Federation of University Women fellowship. In 1953, Shoemaker took a one-year leave of absence and travelled to Massachusetts Institute of Technology to work with David Shoemaker on the structure of transition metals. David Shoemaker renewed her leave of absence contract for another year in 1954. In 1955, Clara Brink Shoemaker and David Shoemaker married. After the wedding, Clara Shoemaker moved to Barbara Low's laboratory at Harvard Medical School. In 1956, her son Robert was born. While taking care of her son, Shoemaker worked from home on the International Tables of Crystallography. In 1959, Shoemaker became a naturalized citizen of the United States of America. Clara and David Shoemaker relocated to Oregon State University in 1970, where David Shoemaker was hired as a chairman and professor of chemistry. Due to the nepotism guidelines of the university, Clara Shoemaker worked as a research associate under Kenneth Hedberg whereas Hedberg's wife Lise Hedberg worked under David Shoemaker. In 1982, Clara Shoemaker was promoted to senior research professor. In 1984, both Clara and David Shoemaker retired from Oregon State University but continued their scientific work.

== Research ==
Together with her husband, David Shoemaker she contributed to the research on transition metal phases and intermetallic compounds. They were the first to recognize that interstices in tetrahedrally close-packed metal crystals are exclusively tetrahedral and only have four types of coordination polyhedra.

== Selected publications ==
Together with Dorothy Hodgkin, she published 3 publications on the crystal structure of vitamin B12:

- Brink, Clara; Hodgkin, Dorothy Crowfoot; Lindsey, June; Pickworth, Jenny; Robertson, John H.; White, John G. (1954-12-01). "Structure of Vitamin B12: X-ray Crystallographic Evidence on the Structure of Vitamin B12". Nature. 174 (4443): 1169–1171. doi:10.1038/1741169a0. ISSN 0028-0836. PMID 13223773. S2CID 4207158.
- Hodgkin Dorothy Mary Crowfoot; Kamper Jennifer; Lindsey June; MacKay Maureen; Pickworth Jenny; Robertson J. H.; Brink-Shoemaker Clara; White John Graham; Prosen R. J. (1957-10-29). "The structure of vitamin B12. I. An outline of the crystallographic investigation of vitamin B12". Proceedings of the Royal Society of London. Series A. Mathematical and Physical Sciences. 242 (1229): 228–263. doi:10.1098/rspa.1957.0174. S2CID 93391328.
- Brink-Shoemaker Clara; Cruickshank Durward William John; Hodgkin Dorothy Mary Crowfoot; Kamper M. Jennifer; Pilling Diana (1964-03-10). "The structure of Vitamin B12 VI. The structure of crystals of vitamin B12 grown from and immersed in water". Proceedings of the Royal Society of London. Series A. Mathematical and Physical Sciences. 278 (1372): 1–26. doi:10.1098/rspa.1964.0042. S2CID 93447375.
