= John Winter Crowfoot =

British archaeologist

John Winter Crowfoot CBE (28 July 1873 – 6 December 1959) was a British educational administrator and archaeologist. He worked for 25 years in Egypt and Sudan, serving from 1914 to 1926 as Director of Education in the Sudan, before accepting an invitation to become Director of the British School of Archaeology in Jerusalem.

== Origins, education and early career ==
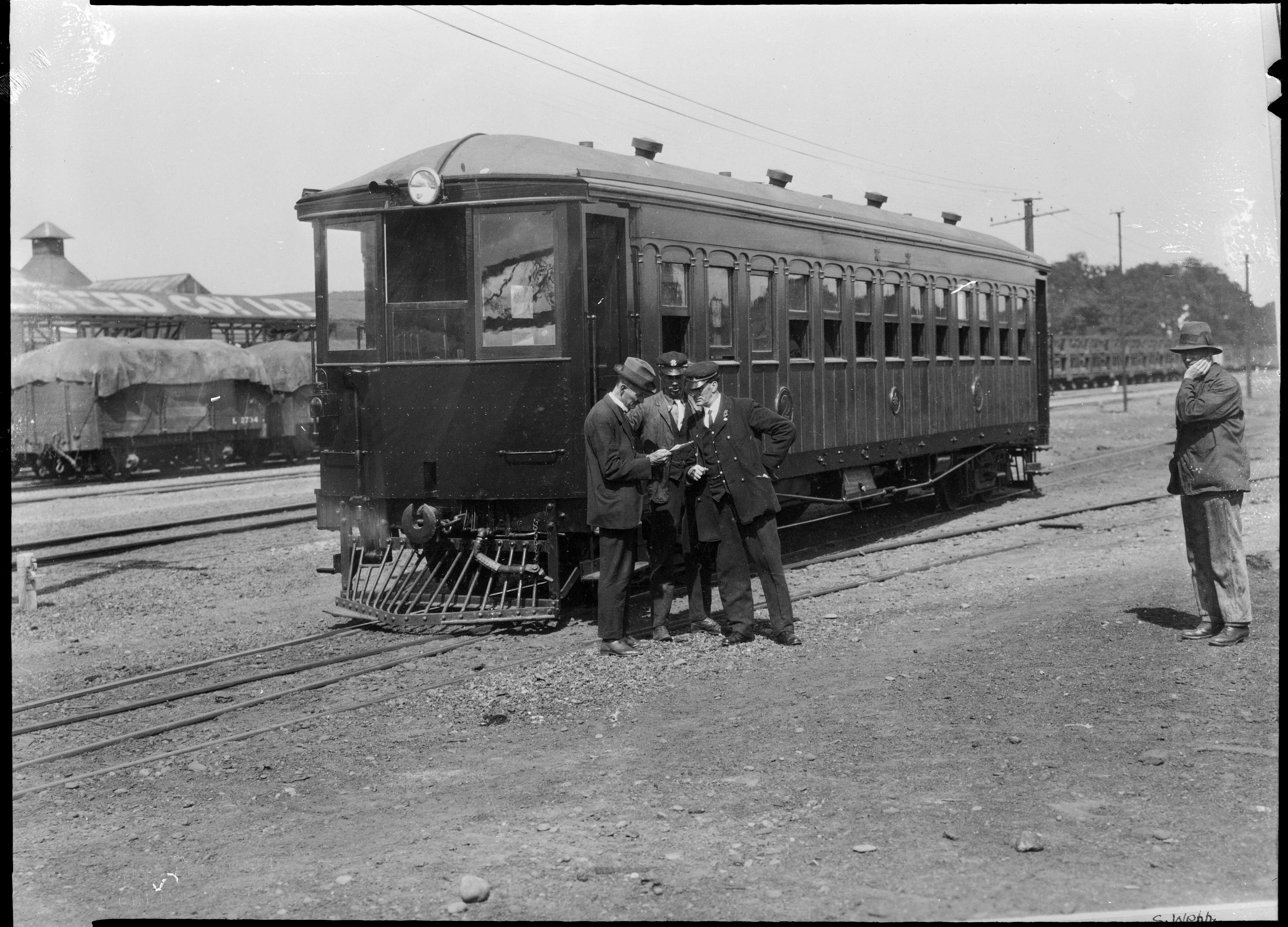

John Winter Crowfoot was the eldest of three children, and the only son, of clergyman John Henchman Crowfoot (1841–1927) and his wife Mary (née Bayly). A Fellow of Jesus College, Oxford, and later the Chancellor of Lincoln Cathedral, John Henchman lived with his wife Mary in Lincoln for most of their married life, retiring to Worthing before World War I.

By long tradition, the Crowfoots were a medical family. Between 1783 and 1907 they provided five generations of surgeons and doctors to the market town of Beccles in Suffolk. John's uncles William Miller Crowfoot (1837–1918) and Edward Bowles Crowfoot (1845–1897) were doctors in Beccles, as was his cousin William Bayly Crowfoot (1878–1907). In 1921 John and his wife Molly leased a house in Geldeston, near Beccles, which became the family home for the next sixty years.

John was educated at the Fauconberge School (Beccles) before entering Marlborough College and then Brasenose College, Oxford, where he read Greats and was Senior Hulme Exhibitioner in 1896.

On graduating Crowfoot studied from 1896 to 1897 at the British School at Athens. He excavated at the site of Hala Sultan Tekke in Cyprus in 1898, on behalf of the British Museum. Lacking private means or other funding to continue an archaeological career, John accepted an appointment in 1899 as lecturer in classics at Birmingham University, the first "red-brick university" to gain a royal charter in the United Kingdom.

== Sudan and Egypt ==
In 1901 John went to Egypt, to take up a post as Assistant Master at a school founded in Cairo by the late Tewfik Pasha. Between 1903 and 1908 he served as assistant director of Education and Acting Conservator of Antiquities for the Government of Sudan, before being appointed in 1908 as Inspector at the Ministry of Education in Cairo.

During his first period in Sudan John Crowfoot became acquainted with Babikr Bedri, a former soldier of the Mahdi. Colonial officials warned Bedri that his intention to set up the first modern school for girls in Sudan would be "under your own name and at your own expense". John Crowfoot made a personal donation of £10 towards the costs. The school opened in 1907.

In the early 20th century the colonial authorities in Sudan still feared a further eruption of Mahdism. As a consequence the region was under quasi-military rule. There were no European women in the country and any man recruited to work in Sudan had to provide assurances that he was not only unmarried but also without a fiancée. In 1909 after John moved to Cairo he was able to marry Grace Mary Hood (Molly), whom he had met in Lincoln years before. She joined him in Egypt and over the next four years their three eldest daughters Dorothy, Joan and Elisabeth were born in Cairo.

In 1916, on the recommendation of Lord Kitchener, Crowfoot returned to the Sudan as the Director of Education and Principal of Gordon College, Khartoum. He was now accompanied by his wife Molly. John Crowfoot served, at the same time, as Director of the Department of Antiquities of the Sudan. In 1919, Crowfoot was awarded the CBE, i.e., he was made a "Commander of the Order of the British Empire". His wartime services in the Sudan, included monitoring shipping in the Red Sea.

Government attitudes towards the provision of educational opportunities to the Sudanese hardened over time, particularly after political disturbances in 1924. Crowfoot, "who despite a lack of forcefulness was an educational administrator of long experience", decided to claim the pension to which he was already entitled and resigned in 1926.

== Palestine ==
That same year, still in his early fifties, John Crowfoot succeeded John Garstang as Director of the British School of Archaeology in Jerusalem. This enabled him and his wife Molly, at long last, to engage in archaeology full-time. He retained the directorship until his retirement in 1935.

Between 1928 and 1930 John Crowfoot directed the BSAJ-Yale University excavation of more than a dozen 5th- and 6th-century Christian churches at Jerash (Gerasa) in the Emirate of Transjordan. This broke with the prevailing "obsession" with the Old Testament among archaeologists in Palestine and their desire "to prove it true", i.e., that the words of the Old Testament could be taken as the literal truth. Under his guidance there was a shift to examining what survived of early Christian archaeology, which was "rich in architecture, art, epigraphy and the classical roots of Western society" (R.W. Hamilton).

From 1931 to 1935 John Crowfoot directed the Joint Expedition of the BSAJ, PEF, Harvard University and the Hebrew University at Samaria-Sebaste. These excavations made it possible to reconstruct the "dramatically changing fortunes" of this provincial capital of the ruler Omri and his son Ahab through twenty centuries, with the successive cultural contributions of Assyrians, Persians, Greeks, Romans, Byzantines and Crusaders. Three large volumes of the findings from this site were published, between 1938 and 1957.

In the words of the Palestine Exploration Fund, "Crowfoot's work in this period was of the greatest importance for Levantine archaeology, with major contributions to the understanding of the Iron Age ceramic sequence, the eastern terra sigillata, and pioneering work on early churches".

From 1945 to 1950 John Crowfoot was Chairman of the Palestine Exploration Fund.

== Family and retirement ==
John Crowfoot married Grace Mary ("Molly"), daughter of Sinclair Frankland Hood, of Nettleham Hall, Lincolnshire, in 1909. A botanist and fine draughtswoman, she became a distinguished scholar in her own right, an authority on archaeological textiles, and served as an equal partner in many of his professional activities. Their nephew (son of Molly's brother, Lt-Cmdr Martin Hood, RN) was the archaeologist Sinclair Hood.

In the years following the end of World War II Crowfoot was an active member of the housing committee at the Loddon Rural District Council, and took pride in his successful support of the distinctive local council housing designed by the Tayler & Green partnership.

At varying times and in varying ways his four daughters followed their parents in pursuing archaeological interests. Joan Crowfoot Payne (1912–2002) worked for thirty years on Egyptian antiquities at the Ashmolean Museum in Oxford; Elisabeth Crowfoot (1914–2005) succeeded her mother as a textile archaeologist; and Diana (1918–2018), a geographer, married Graham Rowley, the Arctic explorer and archaeologist.

Their eldest daughter, Dorothy, visited her parents on site in Jerash and helped with drawings of certain mosaics there. Her field was chemistry and in 1947, aged 36, she was elected a fellow of the Royal Society, only the third woman to have then received that honour. (In 1964 Dorothy would be awarded the Nobel Prize in Chemistry.)

John Winter Crowfoot died in 1959 and is buried, with his wife Molly, next to the tower of St Michael's parish church, Geldeston. The epigraph on their gravestone ("Shall not loveliness be loved forever?") is taken from Murray's translation of The Bacchae by Euripides.

== Papers and publications ==
- John Winter Crowfoot's unpublished papers relating to his time in Egypt, Sudan and Palestine are held, respectively, in the Sudan Archive at Durham University (see catalogue of his papers there) and the archives of the Palestine Exploration Fund in London.
- The published writings of John Winter Crowfoot include archaeological reports, articles on anthropology and folklore, and memoirs.

=== Early works (Anatolia) ===
- Survivals among the Kappadokian Kizilbash (Bektash) (1900)
- Kleinasien, ein Neuland der Kunstgeschichte (1903)

=== Sudan ===
- Some lacunae in the Anthropology of the Anglo-Egyptian Sudan (1907). A paper read before the British Association in August 1907 ..."
- The island of Meroë (London and Boston, 1911)
- Wedding Customs in the Northern Sudan (1922)
- Early Days, 1903–1931 (1954)

=== Palestine ===
- Palestine Exploration Quarterly, 1865 to present, online
- Excavations in the Tyropoeon Valley, Jerusalem, 1927 (Dawsons, 1929; with G.M. Fitzgerald)
- Churches at Jerash (1931)
- Churches at Bosra and Samaria-Sebaste (1937)
- Samaria-Sebaste 2: Early Ivories (1938)
- Gerasa, city of the Decapolis: The Christian churches (American Schools of Oriental Research, 1938)
- Early Churches in Palestine: Schweich Lectures of the British Academy, 1937 (Oxford University Press, 1941)
- Samaria-Sebaste 1: The Buildings (1942)
- Samaria-Sebaste 3: The Objects (1957)

== Sources ==
- Obituary by Kathleen Kenyon in the Palestinian Exploration Quarterly (1960) 92:2, pp. 161–163.
- The Memoirs of Babikr Bedri, Vol 2, Ithaca Press, London (1980). Numerous references to John and Molly Crowfoot.
- Elisabeth Crowfoot, "John Winter Crowfoot", Encyclopedia of Archaeology in the Near East (1997), Vol. 2, pp. 72–73. Published under the auspices of the American Schools of Oriental Research by Oxford University Press.
- Amara Thornton (2011) British Archaeologists, Social Networks and the Emergence of a Profession: The Social History of British Archaeology in the Eastern Mediterranean and Middle East, 1870–1939 (PhD in archaeology, UCL Institute of Archaeology). The thesis focuses on five British archaeologists—John Garstang, John Winter Crowfoot, Grace Mary Crowfoot, George Horsfield and Agnes Conway.
