= Grace Mary Crowfoot =

British archaeologist

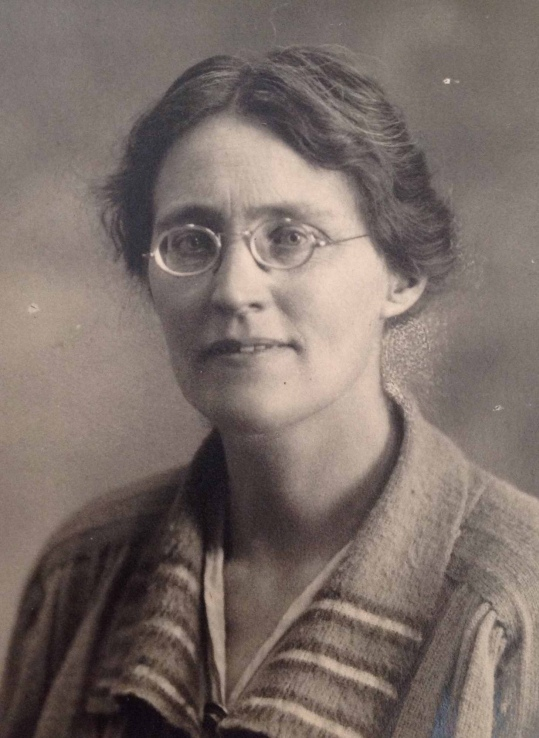
- Born: Grace Mary Hood; 1879; Lincolnshire, England
- Died: 1957 (aged 77–78); Geldeston, Norfolk
- Other name: Molly
- Occupations: botanist and textile archaeologist
- Notable work: From Cedar to Hyssop (1932, co-author)
- Spouse: John Winter Crowfoot (m. 1909)
- Children: Four girls, incl. Dorothy and Joan
- Relatives: Sinclair Hood (nephew)
- Scientific career
- Fields: Archaeology, botany

Grace Mary Crowfoot (née Hood; 1879–1957) was a British archaeologist and a pioneer in the study of archaeological textiles. During a long and active life Molly—as she was always known to friends, family and close colleagues—worked on a wide variety of textiles from North Africa, the Middle East, Europe and the British Isles. Returning to England in the mid-1930s after more than three decades spent in Egypt, Sudan and Palestine, Crowfoot co-authored a 1942 article on the "Tunic of Tutankhamun" and published short reports about textiles from the nearby Anglo-Saxon ship burial at Sutton Hoo (1951-1952) in Suffolk.

Molly Crowfoot trained a generation of textile archaeologists in Britain, among them Audrey Henshall and her daughter Elisabeth, and developed close contacts with textile archaeologists in Scandinavia such as Margrethe Hald, Marta Hoffman and Agnes Geijer. Together they established a new field of study, ensuring that textile remnants found at any site were henceforth preserved for analysis, instead of being cleaned from the metal and other objects to which they remained attached. Much of Crowfoot's collection of textiles, spinning and weaving implements is now held at the Textile Research Centre in Leiden.

Her eldest daughter Dorothy was a prominent chemist and crystallographer who won the Nobel Prize in Chemistry in 1964. Her second daughter Joan was an archaeologist and worked for many years at the Ashmolean Museum in Oxford.

After her death obituaries were published by her son-in-law, the Africanist Thomas Hodgkin and by the archaeologist Kathleen Kenyon.

== Early years, 1879–1908 ==
Born in Lincolnshire, England, in 1879 to Sinclair Frankland Hood, of Nettleham Hall, Lincolnshire, and his wife Grace, daughter of Rev. Charles Trollope Swan, rector of Welton le Wold, Lincolnshire, Grace Mary Hood was the oldest of six children, two girls and four boys. The Hood family were landed gentry, originally from Yorkshire. Her nephew, Sinclair Hood, also became an eminent archaeologist.

Her grandfather, Rev. William Frankland Hood, collected Egyptian antiquities, which were displayed in a wing added for the purpose to the main building of Nettleham Hall. The family interests put her in contact with many archaeologists, among them William Flinders Petrie, and she became lifelong friends with Petrie's wife Hilda.

Dame Elizabeth Wordsworth offered Hood a place at her newly founded women's college in Oxford, Lady Margaret Hall. However, Molly's mother did not see the need for women to attend university and she ultimately turned it down.

Molly's earliest venture into archaeology was in 1908-1909 when she excavated the prehistoric remains in the cave at Tana Bertrand, above San Remo on the Italian Riviera where her family often stayed. She found 300 beads and signs of early occupation. The work would not be published until 1926.

In 1908, determined to make a useful contribution to society, Molly trained to become a professional midwife at Clapham Maternity Hospital in London. The contacts made then proved invaluable later when she was living in the Sudan.

== Life and work in Egypt and Sudan ==
In 1909 Molly married John Winter Crowfoot, whom she had met years before in Lincoln. He was now the Assistant Director of Education in Sudan and she joined him in Cairo where their eldest daughters were born: Dorothy, Joan and Elisabeth. One who became acquainted with the Crowfoots during their years in Sudan, Babikr Bedri, refers to Mrs Crowfoot as "that gracious, unassuming, well-educated lady".

=== Activities ===
Crowfoot learned to take photographs and these illustrate the first of several botanical volumes she produced during their years in Egypt, Sudan and Palestine. In subsequent publications she reverted to line-drawings of her own, feeling that photographs could not represent with sufficient accuracy and clarity the detail of particular plants and flowers. After her death many of her field drawings of wild plants from Northeast Africa and the Middle East were deposited with Kew Gardens in London.

In 1916, in the middle of the First World War, Crowfoot and her husband moved to the Sudan, far from the fighting and remote from the expatriate society of Cairo. There were few white people in Khartoum, none of them women. Her husband was in charge of education and antiquities in the region, becoming Director of Gordon College (today Khartoum University). Meanwhile, Molly immersed herself in the life of the local women across the Nile in Omdurman.

To engage them in conversation she took up the spinning and weaving that occupied much of their time and became a proficient weaver herself, learning to weave cloth on primitive looms. Later she published two papers on this topic. At the request of Flinders Petrie, she compared these methods with the model illustrating Ancient Egyptian methods of spinning and weaving then recently discovered in an 11th dynasty tomb. The techniques and equipment, she found, had changed little since those times.

=== An early campaign against FGM ===
Learning their handicrafts was Crowfoot's way of getting to know the Sudanese women and understand their lives. Through these contacts she also learned, with horror, of the local tradition of Female Genital Mutilation which in Sudan took the most severe form, infibulation.

Always quick to respond, she considered how an outsider, someone related to the colonial government, might best intervene. In 1921, Molly attended a dinner party with the British Governor-General Sir Lee Stack where she spoke loudly and insistently about FGM, a custom that officials might never learn about during their three-year service in the country. As Stack later told a colleague, he was embarrassed to hear this shocking topic over dinner but Crowfoot would not be silenced. This interaction led to permission in 1921 to set up the Omdurman Midwifery Training School, the first such institution in Sudan. It aimed to train local midwives, improve conditions of childbirth and, at the same time, begin to tackle the practise of FGM. To head the school Crowfoot summoned two fellow pupils from her Clapham days, the midwife sisters "Bee" and "Gee" (Beatrice and Mabel) Wolff.

=== The family re-united ===
Following the birth of their fourth daughter Diana and the end of World War I she and her husband John returned for some months to England, where they were re-united with their three older girls and took a lease on a house in Geldeston, Norfolk. It was to be the family home for the next sixty years. Soon they returned to the Sudan.

== Life and work in Palestine, 1926–1935 ==
In 1926 John Crowfoot was offered the Directorship of the British School of Archaeology in Jerusalem. During his time there he ran a number of major excavations at Samaria-Sebaste, 1931-3 and 1935; the Jerusalem Ophel in 1927; and early Christian churches in Jerash, 1928–1930.

Molly Crowfoot was in charge of living and feeding arrangements on site for large, mixed groups that contained archaeologists from the UK, Palestine and US universities. She and her husband were admired for their diplomatic and organisational skills in the smooth running of these collaborative ventures. Molly took a keen interest in the finds and was among the authors and editors of the final three large volumes on Samaria-Sebaste.

While living in Jerusalem Molly Crowfoot gathered folk-tales with her friend Louise Baldensperger, whose missionary parents had settled in the country in 1848. Together they produced From Cedar to Hyssop: A study in the folklore of plants in Palestine (1932), an early work of ethno-botany. (Many years later the tales gathered by the two women were translated back into Arabic and re-published.)

== An active retirement ==
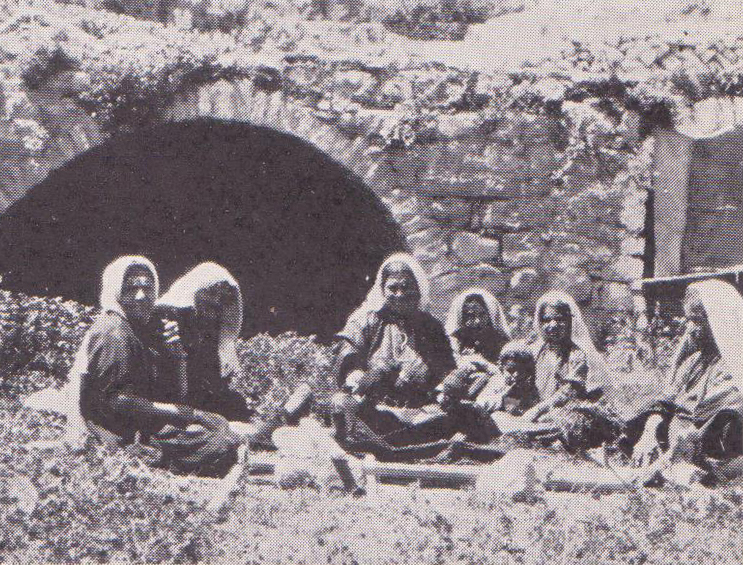
Sitt Hamdiya and Sitt Latifa of Artas demonstrating the use of a ground loom to weave a hammock cradle for Grace Crowfoot, circa 1944.

John and Molly Crowfoot returned to England in the mid-1930s, in time to see their two eldest daughters married and the arrival of the first of their 12 grandchildren.

The family home in Geldeston, the Old House, had a great many visitors over the next 20 years. One would be Yigael Yadin, the son of their friend and collaborator on the Samaria-Sebaste excavations, the Jewish archaeologist Eleazer Sukenik.

Molly Crowfoot always took an interest in village activities on their long summer visits in the 1920s and 1930s. In 1925 she set up a local branch of the Girl Guides. She remained actively involved in her retirement and, as well as being a regular churchgoer, served as wartime secretary of the new Village Produce Association (see "Digging for Victory"), and post-war chairwoman of its Labour Party.

In 1949 she attended the House of Commons when questions were raised about the continued prevalence of FGM in Sudan. Crowfoot approached the Colonial Secretary and the veteran Labour MP Leah Manning to inform them of her experience and views on the subject. An outright ban would merely drive the practise underground, she believed, and undo over two decades of careful work by the Midwives' School to reduce its incidence and harmful effects among Sudanese women.

During Molly Crowfoot's last years she was often bed-ridden as she battled, first, childhood tuberculosis and then leukaemia.

Her daughter Elisabeth helped her examine and analyse the numerous textile samples sent to the Old House from a variety of excavations. As doyenne of the study of ancient Middle-Eastern textiles, Molly was invited in 1949 to examine the linen wrappers of the Dead Sea Scrolls. A vivid preliminary account was published in 1951; a full description and analysis appeared in 1955.

She died in 1957 and is buried, with her husband John, next to the tower of the parish church of St Michael and All Saints in Geldeston.

== Papers, photos and textile collection ==
- The unpublished papers of Molly Crowfoot relating to her time in Egypt, Sudan and Palestine, and many of the photos she took then, are held, respectively, in the Sudan Archive at Durham University Library (see the catalogue of her papers there) and the Palestine Exploration Fund archives in London.
- Many of Crowfoot's drawings of the flora of Northeast Africa and the Middle East were lodged after her death with Kew Gardens. Some of the Palestinian costumes she collected were given to the now defunct Museum of Mankind. Crowfoot's collection of textiles, spinning and weaving implements is today preserved at the Textile Research Centre in Leiden (Netherlands).

== Publications ==
=== Botany ===
- Some desert flowers collected near Cairo (1914). 35 plates.
- Flowering Plants of the Northern and Central Sudan (1928), 163 line drawings.
- From Cedar to Hyssop: A study in the folklore of Plants in Palestine (1932). 76 plates.
- From Cedar to Hyssop (1932) is now available online.
- Some Palestine Flowers: 64 line drawings (1933)

=== Textiles, other crafts and folk-tales ===
1. Northeast Africa and Middle East

- Models of Egyptian Looms (1921)
- A tablet woven band, from Qau el Kebir (1924). From 6th-century A.D. wrapping of a Coptic body.
- Methods of hand spinning in Egypt and the Sudan (1931). Earlier versions of this text were published in Sudan Notes and Records, issues 3 (1920) and 4 (1921).
- Pots, ancient and modern (1932)
- Ramallah embroidery (1935)
- Samaria-Sebaste 2: Early Ivories (1938)
- The tunic of Tut'ankhamun, (1942)
- Palestine Exploration Quarterly, 1865 to present, online
- Handicrafts in Palestine, Primitive Weaving I: Plaiting and finger-weaving (1943)
- Handicrafts in Palestine, 2: Jerusalem hammock cradles and Hebron rugs (1944)
- Folk Tales of Artas—I (1951)
- Folk Tales of Artas—II (1952)
- The linen textiles (1955). Description and analysis of the linen wrappers from the Dead Sea Scrolls.

2. Europe and British Isles

- Anglo Saxon Tablet Weaving (1952)
- Textiles, Basketry and Mats (1954). Entry in History of Technology.
- The braids (1956). Tablet-woven braids from the vestments of St Cuthbert at Durham.
- The textiles (1983). Finds from Sutton Hoo ship burial by Elisabeth Crowfoot, expanding on earlier joint publications in 1951-2 by her mother and herself.

== About Molly Crowfoot ==
- Kathleen Kenyon, obituary
- Thomas Hodgkin, obituary
- Elisabeth Crowfoot, "Grace Mary Crowfoot", Women in Old World Archaeology, 2004. For the complete text, with a full list of Crowfoot's publications, see the linked pdf file. A summary and selected photos are available online.
- Amara Thornton (2011), British Archaeologists, Social Networks and the Emergence of a Profession: the social history of British archaeology in the Eastern Mediterranean and Middle East, 1870–1939 (PhD in Archaeology, UCL Institute of Archaeology). The thesis focuses on five British archaeologists—John Garstang, John Winter Crowfoot, Grace Mary Crowfoot, George Horsfield and Agnes Conway.
- John R. Crowfoot (2012), "Grace Mary Crowfoot", entry in Owen-Crocker G., Coatsworth E. and Hayward M. (eds), Encyclopaedia of Mediaeval Dress and Textiles of the British Isles, Brill: Leiden, 2012, pp. 161–165.
- "Grace Mary Crowfoot (1877–1957), a Grande Dame of Archaeological Textiles", The Textile Research Centre, Leiden (Netherlands).
