= Crystallography on stamps =

Postage stamps with a crystallographic theme

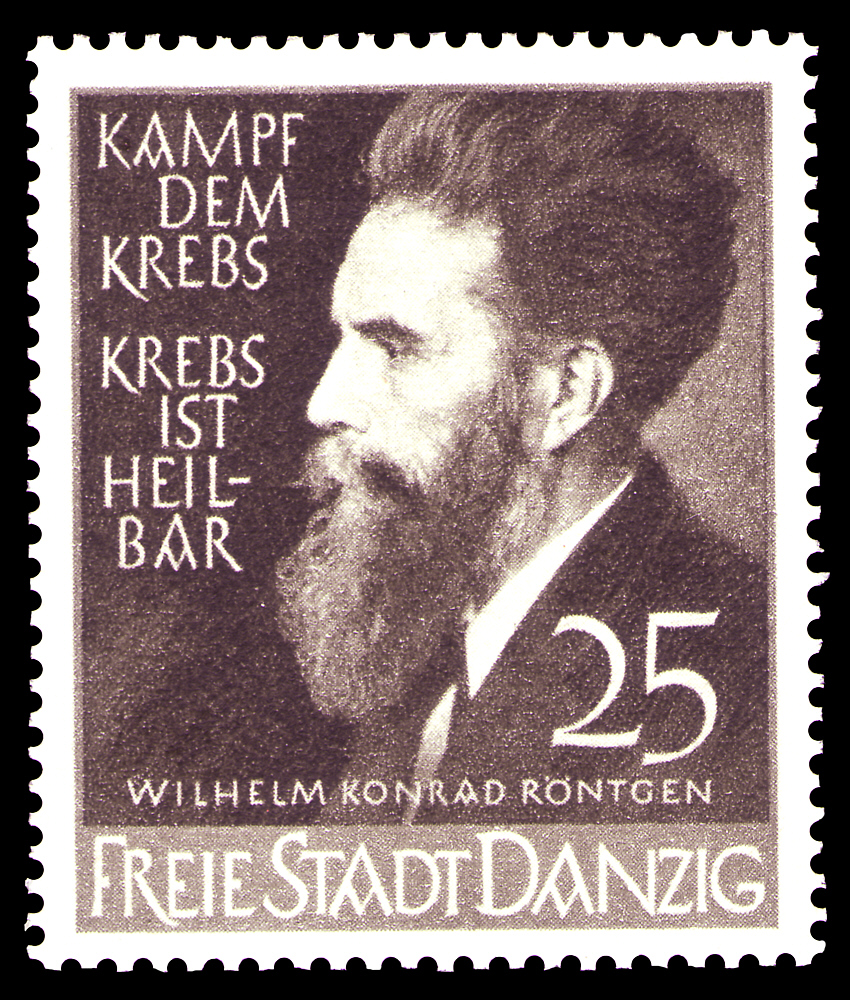
Wilhelm Röntgen, Free City of Danzig, 1939

The depiction of crystallography on stamps began in 1939 with the issue of a Danzig stamp commemorating Wilhelm Röntgen who discovered X-rays. Crystallographic stamps contribute to crystallography education and to the public understanding of science.

Crystallography on stamps was promoted as part of the International Year of Crystallography in 2014.

== Scope ==
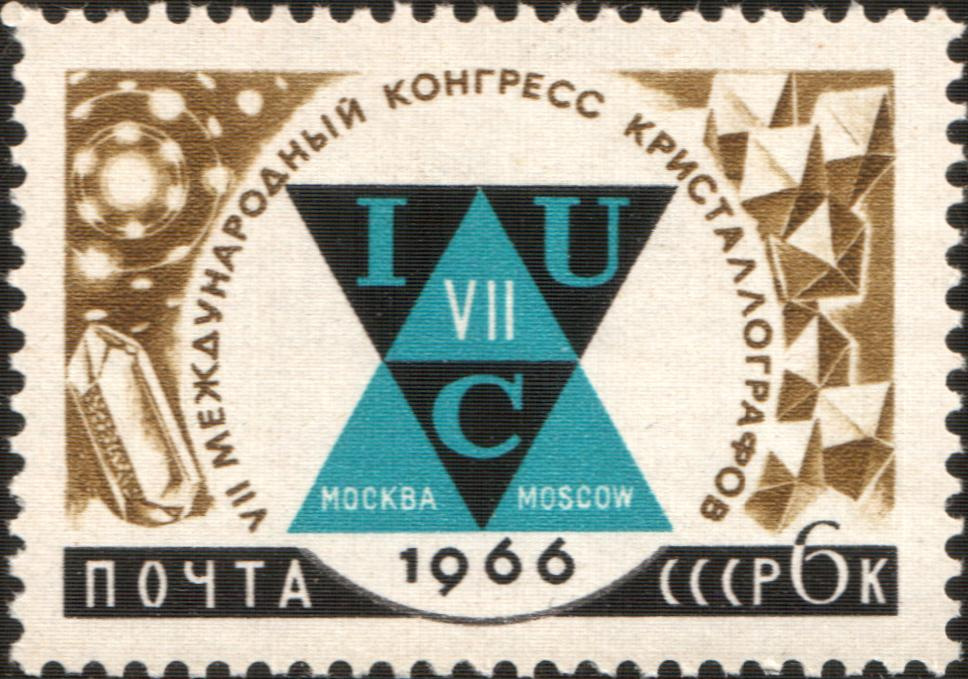
7th Crystallography International Congress, USSR, 1966

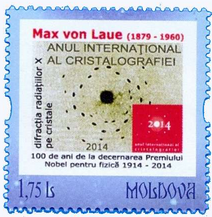
Personalised stamp commemorating Max von Laue and the IYCr, Moldova, 2014

A crystallography stamp has one or more of the following characteristics:

- It depicts a crystallographer, or a polymath who did significant work in the crystallography field
- It depicts a crystallographic concept, such as quasicrystals, or a crystallographic object, such as a crystal prepared for X-ray diffraction
- It depicts a crystallographic symbol or formula such as Bragg's law
- It commemorates a crystallographic event, such as an international congress, or an international year in the crystallographic field

The following types of material are excluded (although they may also be collected by crystallography stamp enthusiasts):

- Postal stationery, e.g. a postcard depicting a crystallographer with a non-crystallographic stamp affixed
- Cinderella, local, private or personal issues, i.e. unofficial stamps
- Non-postal stamps, e.g. revenue stamps
- Stamps issued by non-existing/unrecognized countries and/or in excess of actual postal requirements

== Examples ==
=== Crystallographers ===
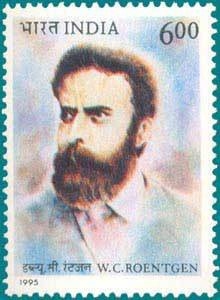
Wilhelm Röntgen, India, 1995

Stamps depicting individual crystallographers are sometimes issued by countries to commemorate the birth or death anniversaries of their significant national crystallographers, For example, on August 6, 1996, the British postal service (Royal Mail) issued a stamp honouring Dorothy Hodgkin, a pioneer of protein crystallography (Great Britain's first female Nobel laureate, in 1964, in Chemistry). Some countries have also issued stamps depicting internationally famous scientists associated with crystallography. For example, up to 2023, 55 stamps from 40 countries have been issued commemorating Wilhelm Röntgen the discoverer of X-rays.

A number of crystallographers have been awarded the Nobel Prize and have subsequently appeared on stamps. The following Nobel prize-winning crystallographers (or their work) have been depicted on stamps: Charles Glover Barkla, Paul D. Boyer, Lawrence Bragg, William Henry Bragg, Georges Charpak, Emmanuelle Charpentier, Francis Crick, Robert Curl, Clinton Davisson, Peter Debye, Johann Deisenhofer, Louis de Broglie, Jennifer Doudna, Ben Feringa, Andre Geim, Herbert A. Hauptman, Dorothy Hodgkin, Jerome Karle, Martin Karplus, Aaron Klug, Brian Kobilka, Harry Kroto, Robert Lefkowitz, Michael Levitt, Hartmut Michel, Konstantin Novoselov, Ardem Patapoutian, Linus Pauling, Max Perutz, Venki Ramakrishnan. Wilhelm Röntgen, Jean-Pierre Sauvage, Dan Shechtman, Richard Smalley, Thomas A. Steitz, Fraser Stoddart, George Paget Thomson, Max von Laue, Arieh Warshel, James Watson, Maurice Wilkins, Ada Yonath.

=== Crystallographic concepts and objects ===
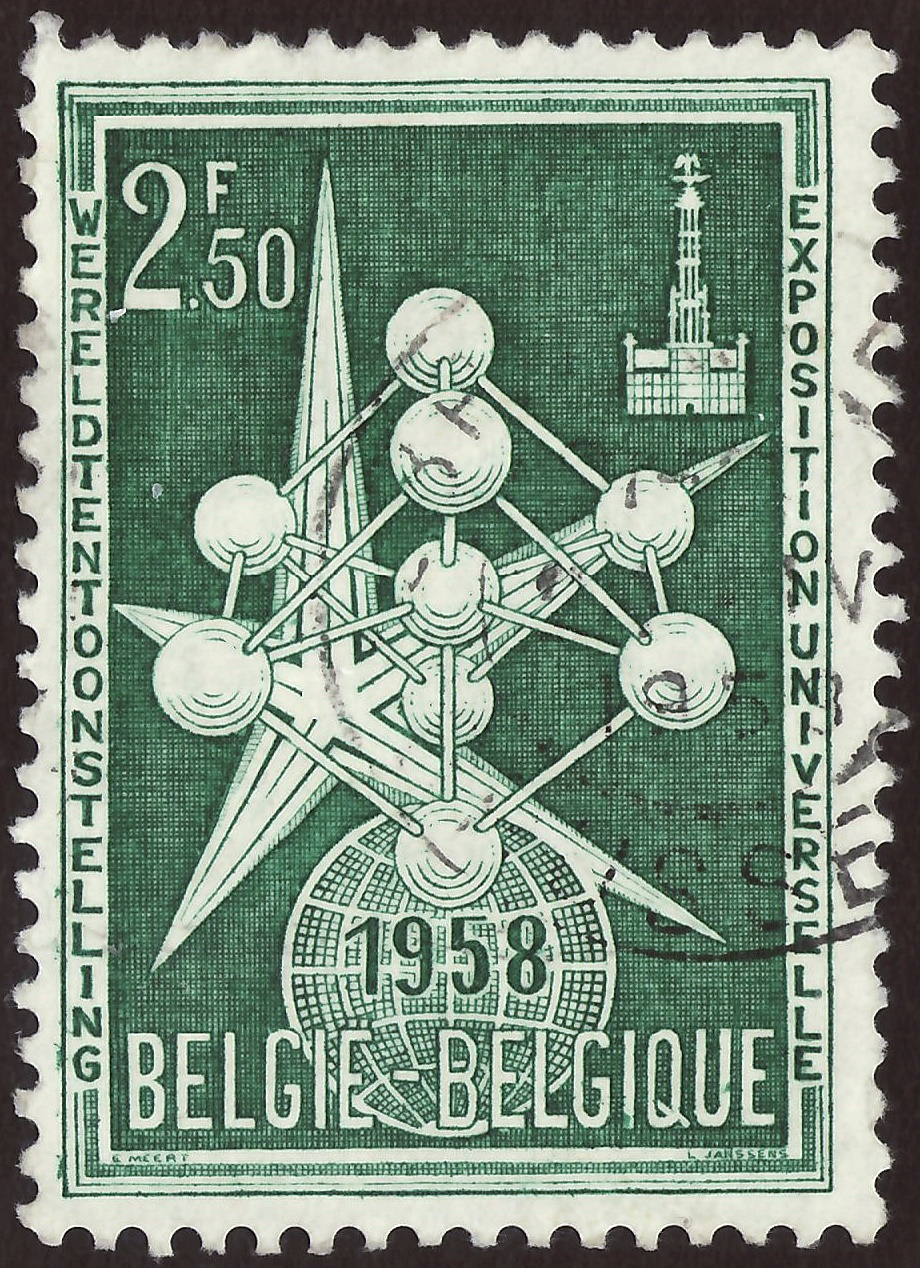
Body-centred cubic structure, Belgium, 1958

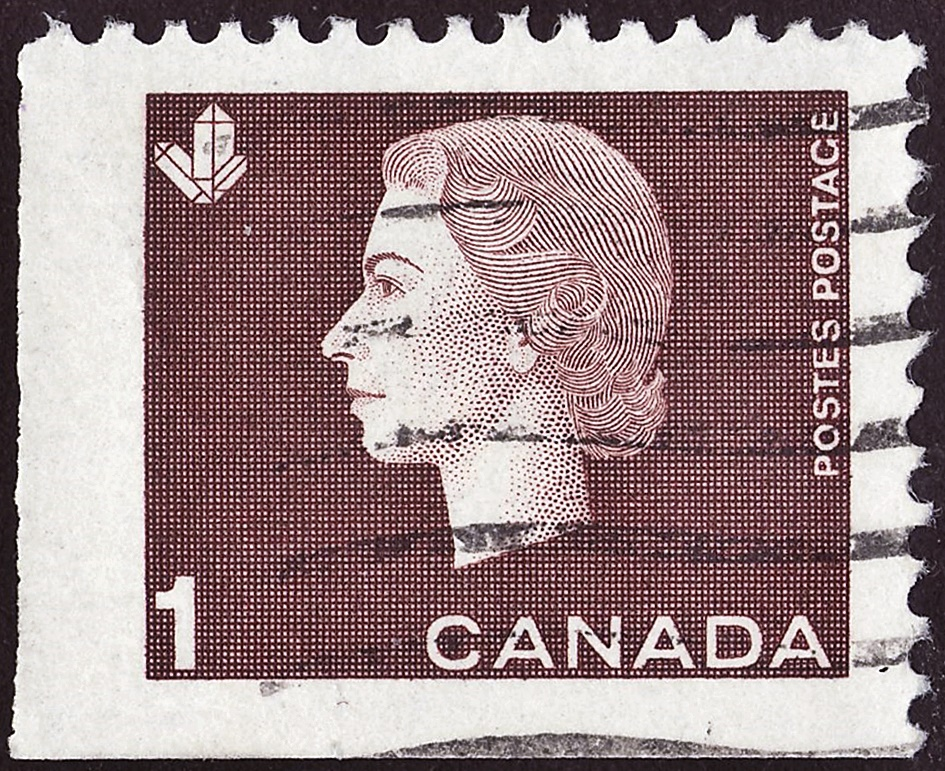
Mining for minerals, Canada, 1963

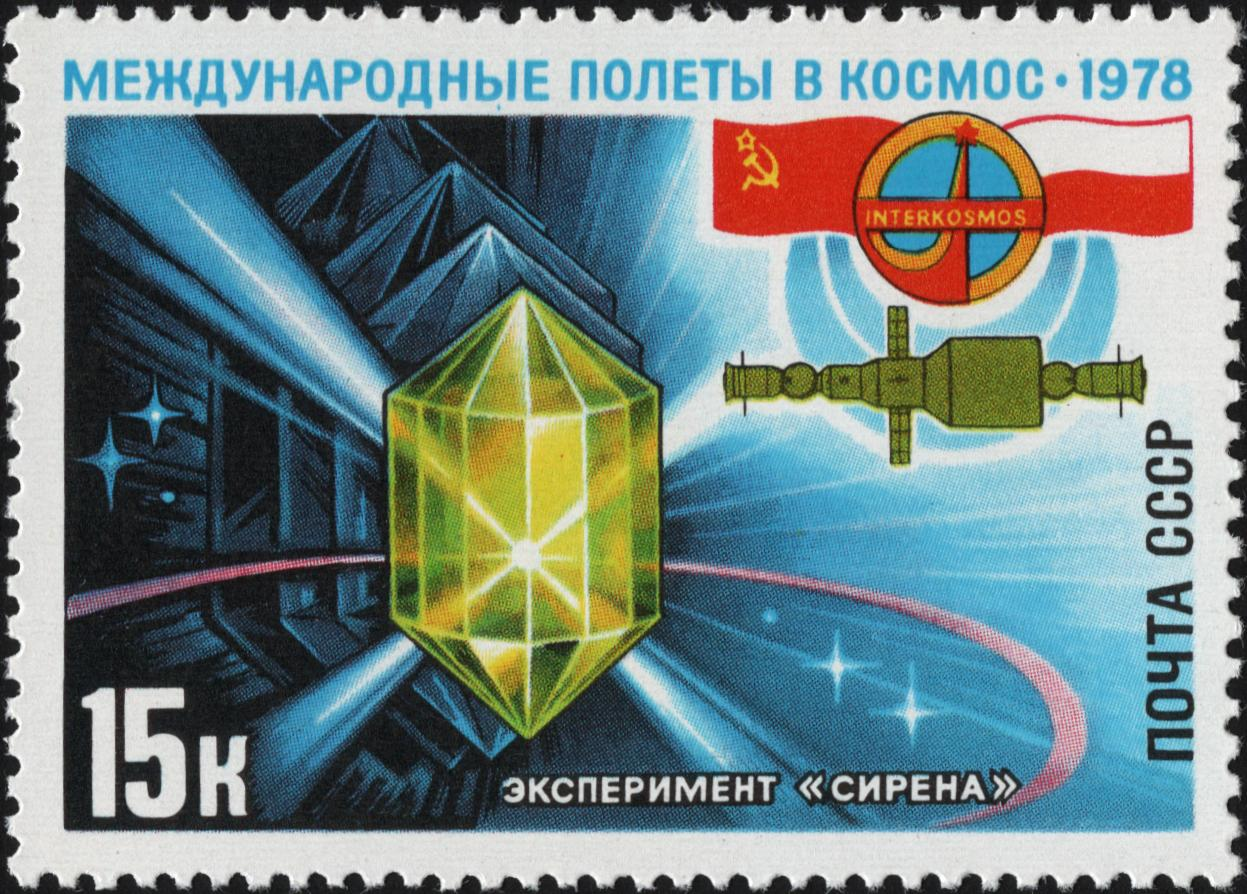
Crystallogenesis, USSR, 1978

Stamps depicting a crystallographic concept or object are sometimes combined with a portrait of the crystallographer responsible for inventing the concept or object. Examples of crystallographic concepts and objects are shown in the gallery above: a 1958 Belgian stamp illustrating body-centred cubic structure, a 1963 Canadian stamp illustrating mining for minerals, and a 1978 Soviet stamp depicting crystallogenesis and commemorating Soviet-Polish cooperation in space flight.

=== Crystals and crystallographic symbols ===
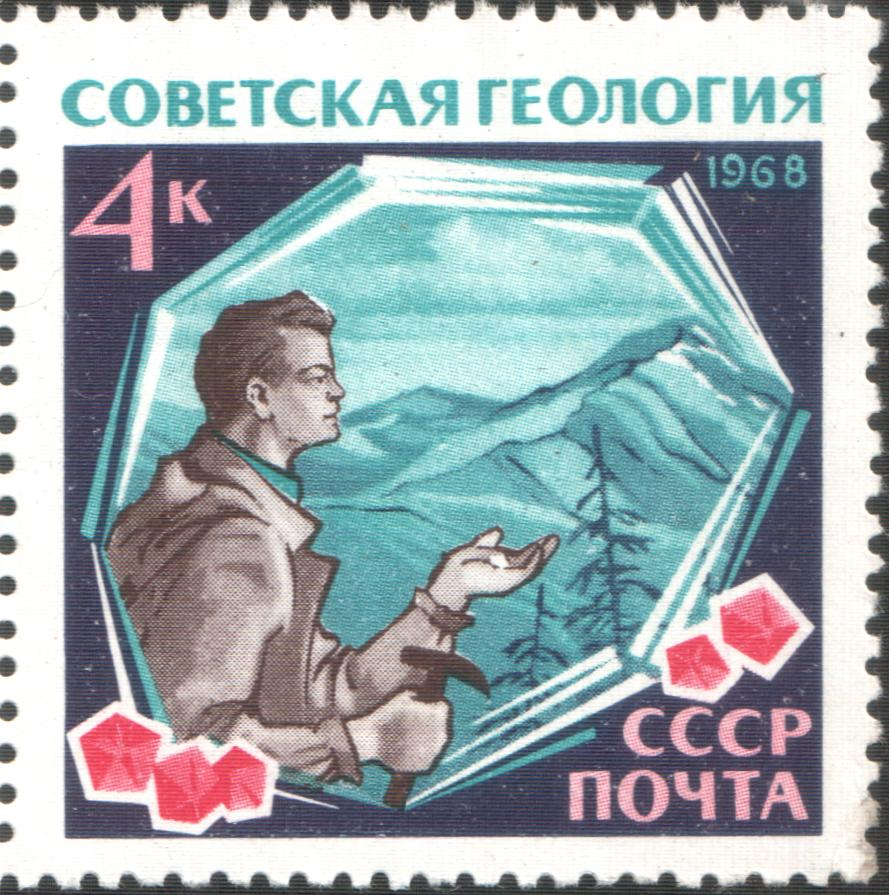
Geologist and garnets, USSR, 1968

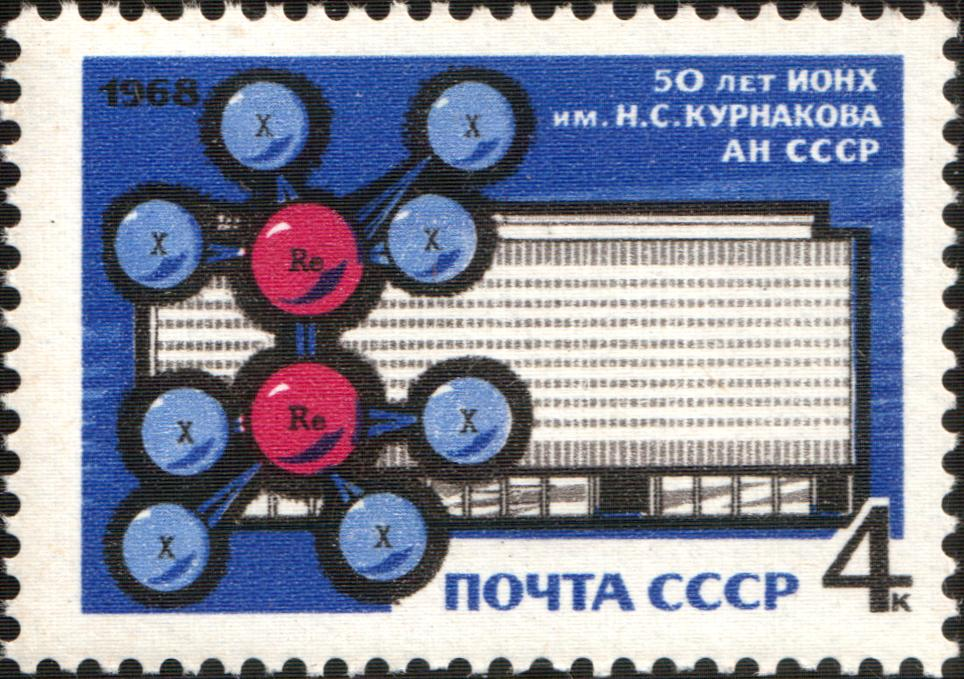
Rhenium dimeric anion with a Re-Re bond, USSR, 1968

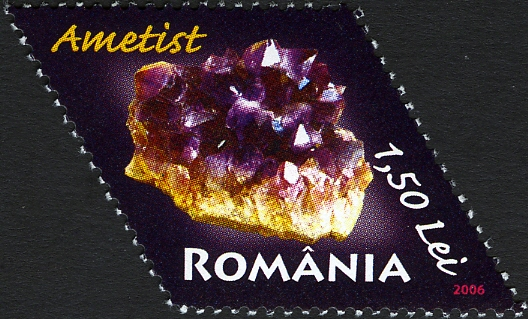
Amethyst, Romania, 2006

Stamps depicting crystals or crystallographic symbols are shown in the gallery above: a 1968 Soviet stamp depicting a geologist and garnet crystals, a 1968 Soviet stamp depicting a Rhenium dimeric anion with a quadruple Re-Re bond (Re_{2}Cl_{8}^{2-}), and a 2006 Romanian stamp illustrating amethyst crystals.

=== International Year of Crystallography ===
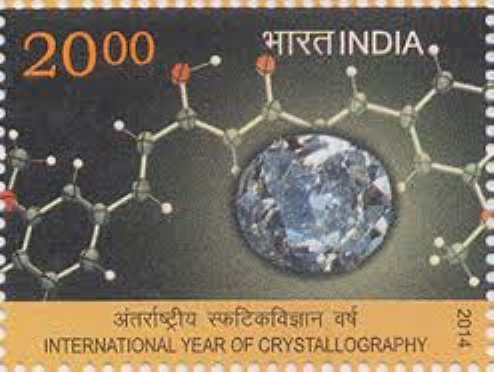
IYCr and curcumin, India, 2014

The International Year of Crystallography (IYCr) took place in 2014. To promote crystallography the following countries issued stamps to commemorate the IYCr: Austria (personalised), Belgium, India, Israel, Liechtenstein, Mexico, Moldova (personalised), North Korea, Poland, Portugal, South Korea, Slovakia, Slovenia and Switzerland.

== Publications ==
No book has yet been published exclusively in the area of crystallographic stamps, however much crystallographic material is included in the book A philatelic ramble through chemistry by Edgar Heilbronner and Foil Miller.

Daniel Rabinovich is the current leading writer in the field having published articles on the International Year of Crystallography, and 35 articles covering chemistry, crystallography and physics philatelic subjects in the journal Chemistry International from 2007 to 2013.

The Chemistry and Physics on Stamps Study Unit (CPOSSU) of the American Topical Association has published a members' journal Philatelia Chimica et Physica since 1979 and a number of articles cover crystallographic topics.

Listings of new issues of crystallographic stamps are included in the monthly Scott Stamp magazine and in Linn's Stamp News; they are also available online from October 2010 to date in the Science & Technology section.
