= Joan Crowfoot Payne =

British Curator, Egyptologist

Joan Crowfoot Payne

Joan Crowfoot Payne (16 January 1912 – 4 October 2002) was a British archaeologist specialising in the study of lithics (stone tools and chipped stone) from the Ancient Near East and worked as Cataloguer of the Ancient Egyptian collection at the Ashmolean Museum in Oxford.

== Early life and education ==
The second of four sisters, Joan Crowfoot was born in 1912 in Giza (Egypt) to the educationalist and archaeologist John Winter Crowfoot (1873–1959) and Molly Crowfoot (née Hood) (1877–1957). She and her older sister, the future Nobel-prize-winning chemist Dorothy Crowfoot Hodgkin, attended the Sir John Leman Grammar School in Beccles, Suffolk.

From 1929 to 1932 Crowfoot Payne studied at the London School of Medicine for Women but was unable to complete her medical training due to an eye condition. The following year, in 1932–1933, she attended the University of Cambridge as a Research Student on the Diploma Course in Archaeology. Her lack of Latin meant she could not sit the qualifying exam for the course. (Her sister Dorothy had to cram Latin in order to take up a place at Somerville College in Oxford.)

== Career ==
Joan Crowfoot Payne participated in archaeological excavations in the U.K., Palestine, and Iraq studying lithics (chipped stone), and working with her father John Winter Crowfoot, Dorothy Garrod, John Garstang, Mortimer Wheeler, and Kathleen Kenyon among other archaeologists.

In 1957 Crowfoot Payne was appointed to the post of Cataloguer in the Ashmolean Museum in Oxford, with responsibility for cataloguing the Egyptian and Nubian collections, resulting in her 1993 publication of the Catalogue of the Predynastic Egyptian Collection in the Ashmolean Museum; she was also involved in creating displays of lithic material in the Egyptian and Near Eastern galleries. Crowfoot Payne collaborated with Elise Jenny Baumgartel on the publication of Flinders Petrie's excavations at Naqada, publishing an update to Baumgartel's Petrie's Naqada Excavations: A supplement (1970). In 1965 she was promoted to a Departmental Assistantship at the Ashmolean.

She retired in 1979 and a year later was awarded an Honorary Master of Arts degree by the University of Oxford. Her papers are in the Griffith Institute Archive in Oxford.

== Personal life ==
Joan Crowfoot married Denis Payne in 1938; they had five children, four girls and a boy. Crowfoot Payne died in 2002, aged 90, and is buried with her parents and sister Elisabeth next to the church tower in Geldeston, the village in Norfolk where the family had its English base from 1921 onwards.

== Selected publications ==
- 'An Early Amethyst Vase', Journal of Egyptian Archaeology. 60. pp. 79–81 (1974)
- An Early Dynastic 3. Flint Industry from Abu Salabikh (London, 1980)
- 'Appendix to Naqada Excavations Supplement', Journal of Egyptian Archaeology 73:1, pp. 181–9 (1987)
- Catalogue of the Predynastic Egyptian Collection in the Ashmolean Museum (Oxford, 1993)
- 'Lapis Lazuli in Early Egypt', Iraq 30:1, pp. 58–61 (1968)
- 'The Chronology of Predynastic Egyptian Decorated Ware', Eretz-Israel. Archaeological, Historical and Geographical Studies. 21 pp. 77–82 (1990)
- 'Tomb 100: The Decorated Tomb at Hierakonpolis Confirmed', Journal of Egyptian Archaeology. 59, pp. 31–35 (1973)
