= Sinclair Hood =

British anthropologist and archaeologist (1917–2021)

Sinclair Hood FBA
- Hood in his office as Director of the BSA, 1954–1962
- Born: Martin Sinclair Frankland Hood; 31 January 1917; Cobh, Ireland
- Died: 18 January 2021 (aged 103)
- Education: Harrow School; British School at Athens; British Institute at Ankara
- Alma mater: Magdalen College, Oxford; University of London
- Spouse: Rachel Simmons (m. 1957; died 2016)
- Children: 3
- Relatives: Grace Mary Crowfoot (aunt)

Martin Sinclair Frankland Hood, FBA (31 January 1917 – 18 January 2021), generally known as Sinclair Hood, was a British archaeologist and academic. He was Director of the British School at Athens from 1954 to 1962, and led the excavations at Knossos from 1957 to 1961. He turned 100 in January 2017 and died in January 2021, two weeks short of his 104th birthday.

As its review in the American Journal of Archaeology forecast, his The Arts in Prehistoric Greece became a "standard authoritative handbook for years to come" on Aegean art.

== Early life and education ==
Martin Sinclair Frankland Hood was born in Cobh, (then Queenstown, and a British naval base), Ireland, in 1917. He was the only child of Martin Arthur Frankland Hood, a lieutenant commander in the Royal Navy, and Frances Ellis, the daughter of James Miller Winants, of Bayonne, New Jersey, United States, and stepdaughter of Lucius F. Donohoe, twice-elected Mayor of Bayonne. Hood's paternal ancestors were lowland Scots. His ancestor John Hood came to England in January 1660, during the English Civil War, with the Parliamentarian army of George Monck. He transferred to be under the command of Thomas Fairfax and settled in Yorkshire. His successor married a daughter of Francis Radclyffe, 1st Earl of Derwentwater.

Subsequent generations of Hoods moved south, and by the early nineteenth century were landed gentry of Nettleham Hall, Lincolnshire: they had strong ecclesiastical and military traditions. His father's sister, Grace Mary Crowfoot, was a pioneer of archaeological textiles, and married the educational administrator and archaeologist John Winter Crowfoot. Sinclair Hood's father died shortly after the First World War ended in November 1918. Sinclair was raised by his mother in London in an Anglo-Catholic milieu, not far from Bude on the northern coast of Cornwall.

After Harrow, Hood studied Classics and Modern History and received a Master of Arts degree from Magdalen College, Oxford, in 1938. During World War II he was a conscientious objector serving with the Civil Defence Service and Holborn Stretcher Party. At his mother's behest, he apprenticed to a Chiswick architect for a time, which Hood considered a "great help for [his] later career" in that he learned to measure and draw. After the war, in 1947, he received a Diploma in Prehistoric European Archaeology from the University of London, having been taught by Kathleen Kenyon and V. Gordon Childe. Fellow students included Leslie Grinsell and Leslie R. H. Willis; senior by a year were Nancy Sandars, Grace Simpson, and Edward Pyddoke. He learned the rigorous method of excavation and the stratigraphical approach pioneered by Mortimer Wheeler and Kathleen Kenyon, working with her in London (Southwark) and also as the last assistant of Leonard Woolley at Atchana (then in Turkey). Hood visited Greece (but not Crete) before the Second World War, and after the war was a student at the British School at Athens, and the British Institute at Ankara.

== Academic career ==
Hood was assistant director of the British School at Athens from 1949 to 1951, and served as its director from 1954 to 1962. His work was done mostly in mainland Greece and in Turkey, but also in Mandatory Palestine and on the island of Crete. He excavated at Emporio on Chios between 1952 and 1955, with several study sessions to 1961, and at Knossos between 1957 and 1961.

In the 1960s, Hood returned to England, settling in Great Milton near Oxford. He took no academic or museum positions. Early in his career he did not take a post as assistant professor at Birmingham. Later, by his own account, he "was asked to put in for the job to run the Ashmolean, but ... decided not to go for it".

A colleague noted, "He is a prime example of a teacher who has never taught, at least in the narrower academic sense of the word. His instruction is tacit, by example; or explicit, and then informal, in the trench or the museum or over the dinner table."

From the 1960s, Hood continued to excavate in Greece, and to write books. His contributions to academic research include The Bronze Age Palace at Knossos: Plan and Sections and the Archaeological Survey of the Knossos Area both published in 1981. He considered his major life work to be the catalogue of the Bronze Age masons' marks at Knossos: The Masons' Marks of Minoan Knossos, edited by Lisa Bendall and published in 2020.

He gave the following advice to aspiring archaeologists:

"Well, to think for themselves and not take anything for granted. And to look at things; to look at the originals as much as you can, and also at the countryside where things are. It is very much a matter of observation, of looking with your eyes. It is extraordinary what you may find which other people just simply haven't seen because they haven't looked or not looked thoroughly enough or in the right place. It is very much a matter of looking."

== Personal life ==
On 4 March 1957, Hood married Girton College, Cambridge-educated (MA 1949) classicist Rachel Simmons (1931–2016), whom he had met conducting the excavations at Emporio. She had previously been a secretary to writer J. B. Priestley, and would later organise Adult Literacy at Thame. They had a son, Martin, and two daughters, Mary and Dictynna.

== Select bibliography ==
For a fuller Bibliography of the Works of Sinclair Hood as published to 1994 and forthcoming from 1994, see Knossos: A Labyrinth of History, 1994, pages xix to xxv.

General Works

- The Home of the Heroes: The Aegean before the Greeks (London, 1967)
- The Minoans – Ancient Peoples and Places (Thames & Hudson Ltd 1971)
- The Arts in Prehistoric Greece (Pelican History of Art 1978, 2nd edn. 1992)

Excavation Reports

- Prehistoric Emporio and Ayio Gala: V. 1: Excavations in Chios, 1938–55 (British School at Athens Studies, 1982)
- With Cadogan, Gerald. Knossos Excavations 1957–61: Early Minoan (BSA, 2011).

Miscellaneous

- (with William Taylor) The Bronze Age Palace at Knossos: Plan and Sections (BSA Supplementary Volume 13; London 1981)
- (with David Smyth) Archaeological Survey of the Knossos Area (2nd edition revised and expanded; BSA Supplementary Volume 14; London 1981)
- The Masons' Marks of Minoan Knossos edited by Lisa Bendall (BSA Supplementary Volume 49, London 2020)
