= Tim Murray (archaeologist) =

Australian archaeologist

Timothy Andrew Murray (born 12 February 1955) is an Australian archaeologist.

== Early life and education ==
Murray was born in Sydney on 12 February 1955 and raised on his family's pastoral station on the Darling River New South Wales, Australia. He was the fourth generation of Murrays on the property, while his grandfather, Hubert Murray (1867–1957), was an amateur anthropologist and Aboriginal stone tool collector.

Murray was educated as a boarder at Sydney Grammar School where he was made Joint Captain in 1972. He won a scholarship to the University of Sydney where he studied under specialist in race history Bob Dreher and historian of fascism Richard Bosworth. He completed a double honours Bachelor of Arts degree in history.

After short periods as a graduate student at Cambridge University and the University of Arizona in the 1980s Murray undertook post graduate studies at the University of Sydney with his PhD dissertation, Remembrance of Things Present: Appeals to Authority in the History and Philosophy of Archaeology in 1987.

== Academic career ==
He joined the Archaeology department of La Trobe University in 1986 as a lecturer. On the retirement of the foundation Chair Professor Jim Allen, Murray was appointed to the Chair of Archaeology in 1995 which he held until 2014. From 2009-2014 he was Dean of the Faculty of Humanities at La Trobe, and in 2010 was appointed Charles La Trobe Professor of Archaeology. He has also taught at the University of New South Wales, the University of Sydney, Cambridge University, the University of Leiden (The Netherlands), the Université de Paris I (Panthéon-Sorbonne), the Ecole des hautes etudes en sciences sociales (Paris) and the Institute of Archaeology, University College London, and has twice been appointed as Director’s Scholar at the Getty Research Institute and the Getty Museum in Los Angeles, California. He was elected a Fellow of the Society of Antiquaries of London in 2003 and Fellow of the Australian Academy of the Humanities in the same year.

== Research projects ==
His research interests include the history, philosophy and sociology of archaeology, theoretical archaeology (particularly issues of temporality), contact archaeology, the archaeology of the modern world, and heritage issues. He was editor in chief of the Bulletin of the History of Archaeology.

In Melbourne, he has played prominent roles in developing large scale historical archaeological excavations in urban contexts including the Casselden Place dig, and recent excavations at the Royal Exhibition Building.

- Sir John Lubbock and the foundation of prehistoric archaeology
- Building Transnational Archaeologies in the Modern World 1750-1950
- Urban Archaeology in Melbourne
- Exploring the Archaeology of the Modern City
- An Archaeology of Australia
- A Global History of Archaeology

== Bibliography ==
- Encyclopedia of archaeology, edited by Tim Murray, Santa Barbara, Calif.: ABC-CLIO, c1999-2001
- Archaeology from Australia, edited by Tim Murray, Melbourne, Vic. : Australian Scholarly Publishing, 2004. ISBN 1740970632
