= Carolina Henriette MacGillavry =

Dutch chemist (1904–1993)

- Born: 22 January 1904; Amsterdam, Netherlands
- Died: 9 May 1993 (aged 89); Amsterdam, Netherlands
- Education: University of Amsterdam
- Occupations: Chemist and crystallographer
- Known for: Discoveries about diffraction in crystallography
- Spouse: J. H. Nieuwenhuijsen
- Scientific career
- Doctoral advisor: Adriaan H. W. Aten
- Other academic advisors: Johannes Martin Bijvoet
- Doctoral students: Clara Brink Shoemaker; Philip Coppens

Carolina Henriette MacGillavry (22 January 1904 – 9 May 1993) was a Dutch chemist and crystallographer. She is known for her discoveries on the use of diffraction in crystallography.

== Biography ==
MacGillavry (nicknamed "Mac") was born on 22 January 1904, in Amsterdam, the second of six children in an intellectual family (her father was a brain surgeon, her mother a teacher).

=== Education ===
In 1921, MacGillavry began studying chemistry at the University of Amsterdam. After graduating in 1925, she developed an interest in the (then) emerging field of quantum mechanics. In 1928, she gave "a very topical" presentation on quantum mechanical calculations on the hydrogen molecule.

She obtained her master's degree (cum laude) on March 16, 1932, and continued to work as an assistant to a chemist named A. Smits. She became a friend of J. M. Bijvoet, and became interested in crystallography which led to her 1937 PhD thesis on the subject, which she completed cum laude with Prof. AHW Aten on 27 January 1937. She then became an assistant to Anton Eduard van Arkel at Leiden, but Bijvoet asked her to come back to the Amsterdam crystallography laboratory that same year. Together with Bijvoet, she researched electromagnetic diffraction and its use in crystallography. She also did research in inorganic chemistry.

=== Crystallography ===
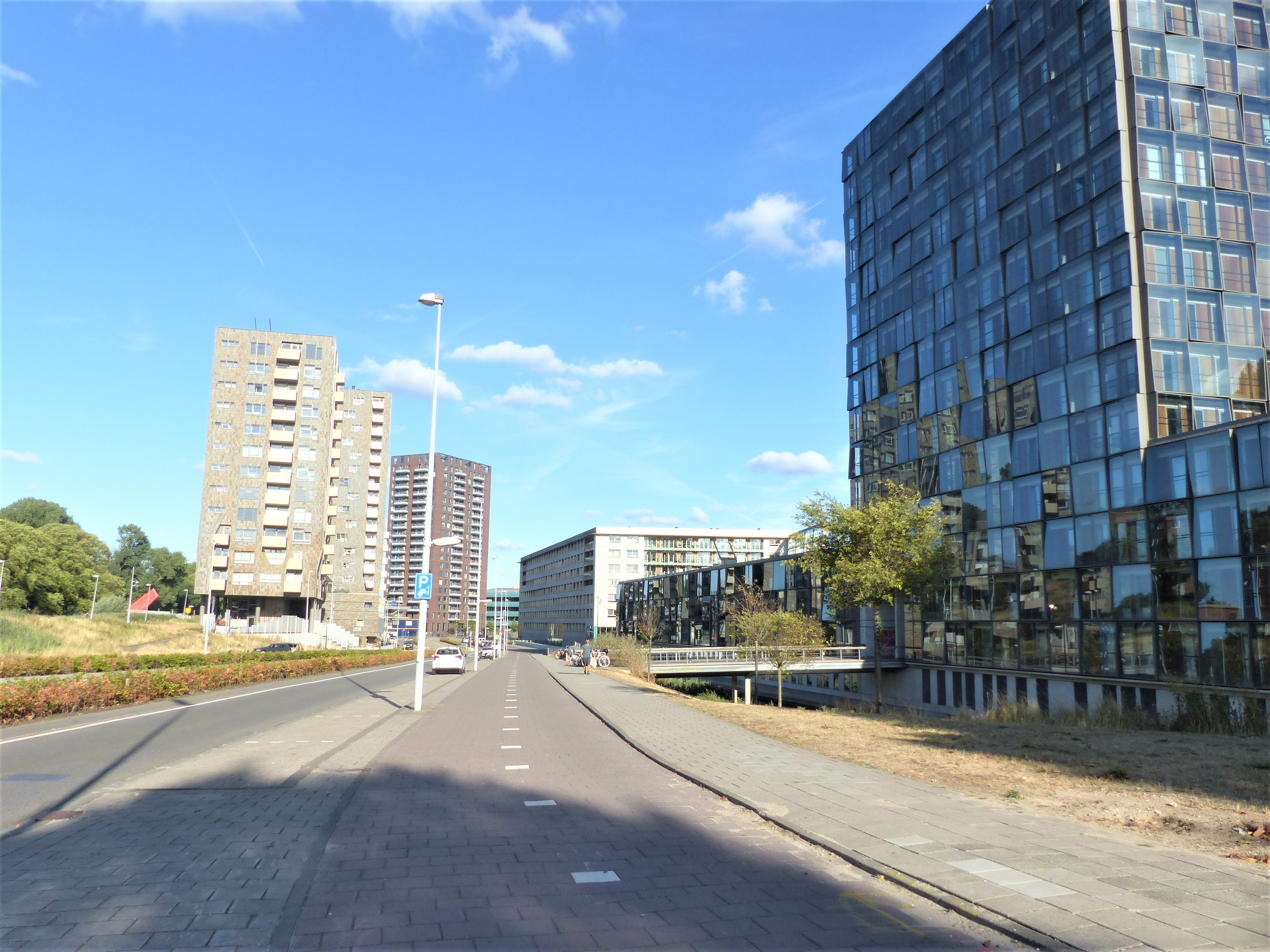
Carolina Macgillavry street, Watergraafsmeer.

After World War II, MacGillavry was one of the developers of direct methods, an innovative calculus that could be used in crystallography. The method uses the Harker–Kasper inequality, that was first published in 1948 by crystallographers D. Harker and John Simon Kasper. Due to her work on Harker–Kasper inequalities, she became an international authority on the subject and co-authored the standard text about it in the Netherlands.

In 1948, she worked with Raymond Pepinsky in Auburn, Alabama, for a year. The Dutch company Philips also grew interested in her work on the chemistry of solids.

In 1950, she became the first woman to be appointed to the Royal Netherlands Academy of Arts and Sciences. In the same year she became a professor at the University of Amsterdam and she retired in 1972.

In 1986, In the English-speaking world MacGillavry became famous for her book Symmetry aspects of M. C. Escher's periodic drawings on the works of the Dutch graphic artist M. C. Escher. The book was instrumental in drawing international attention to the artist.

=== Personal life ===
MacGillavry married the oto-rhino-laryngologist J. H. Nieuwenhuijsen in 1968.

She died 9 May 1993, aged 89, in Amsterdam, and is buried in Utrecht.

A street in Watergraafsmeer, the Netherlands, is named in her honor.
