= List of fellows of the Royal Society elected in 1947 =

Fellows of the Royal Society elected in 1947.

== Fellows ==
- William Joscelyn Arkell
- Clement Attlee
- George Macdonald Bennett
- William Sawney Bisat
- Dame Mary Lucy Cartwright
- Edward Joseph Conway
- Thomas George Cowling
- James Craigie
- Morley Benjamin Crane
- William Jolly Duncan
- Meredith Gwynne Evans
- Wilhelm Siegmund Feldberg
- Tom Goodey
- Dorothy Mary Crowfoot Hodgkin
- John Hutchinson
- Derek Jackson
- Sir Geoffrey Jefferson
- Sir Hans Adolf Krebs
- Frederick George Mann
- Philip Burton Moon
- Egon Orowan
- Friedrich Adolf Paneth
- Muriel Robertson
- Frederick John Marrian Stratton
- Conrad Hal Waddington
- Sir Frank Whittle

== Foreign members ==
- Élie Joseph Cartan
- Paul Karrer
- Harold Clayton Urey
- Ojvind Winge

== Royal Fellow (later Patron) ==
- Elizabeth II
