= Symmetry aspects of M. C. Escher's periodic drawings =

Book about M. C. Escher's art

- Cover page of the 2017 third edition
- Author: Caroline H. MacGillavry
- Language: English
- Subject: Symmetry, Tessellation, M. C. Escher
- Publisher: Oosthoek
- Publication date: 1965
- Publication place: Netherlands
- Media type: Print
- Pages: 84
- OCLC: 471923910
- Dewey Decimal: 769.924
- LC Class: NC745.M3
- Text: Symmetry aspects of M. C. Escher's periodic drawings at Internet Archive

Symmetry aspects of M. C. Escher's periodic drawings is a book by crystallographer Caroline H. MacGillavry published for the International Union of Crystallography (IUCr) by Oosthoek in 1965. The book analyzes the symmetry of M. C. Escher's colored periodic drawings using the international crystallographic notation.

In 1959, MacGillavry met Escher. His work, the regular tiling of the plane, showed obvious links with the symmetry principles of crystallography. After seeking approval from the organisers (Joseph and Gabrielle Donnay), MacGillavry asked Escher to exhibit his lithographic works at the IUCr Congress in Cambridge, U.K. in 1960. The exhibition was a success, and as a consequence the IUCr commissioned MacGillavry to write the book under its auspices.

== Structure and topics ==
The book has three chapters. In the first chapter, entitled Patterns with Classical Symmetry, the author introduces the concepts of motif, symmetry operations, lattice and unit cell, and uses these to analyze the symmetry of 13 of Escher's tiling designs.

In the second chapter, Patterns with Black-white Symmetry, the antisymmetry operation (indicated by a prime ') is introduced. The chapter analyzes 22 of Escher's design in terms of black-white symmetry and assigns each a symbol in the international notation describing its symmetries.

In the third chapter, Patterns with Polychromatic Symmetry, the analysis is extended to 7 of Escher's design possessing three or more colors. The book is printed in full color to facilitate the recognition of color symmetries in the images.

== Audience ==
The publication of the book was sponsored by the IUCr and the original target audience was crystallography students learning the principles of symmetry, particularly color symmetry. In the introduction to the book the author states "Although the book is meant primarily for undergraduate students, I hope that many people who are simply amused and intrigued by Escher's designs will be interested to see how they illustrate the laws of symmetry".

== Reception and influence ==
The reception of the book was positive. Robert M. Mengel in Scientific American wrote "[the author] has organized this unique and beautiful book from the corpus of marvelous spacefilling periodic drawings made over two decades by the artist Maurits C. Escher. Adding a few specially drawn for this work, Escher has here given us the classical crystal groups in the plane, and a good many more that exploit the latest extensions to color symmetry, foreseen by the artist before mathematicians had officially recognized and classified them."

F. I. G. Rawlins in Acta Crystallographica wrote "Under [the author's] sure guidance the reader is skilfully conducted through such regions of the theory of symmetry as are necessary for a tolerable grasp of the full significance of these patterns, several of them produced in full colour."

J. Bohm reviewed the book in Kristall Und Technik. Bohm acknowledged the special value of Escher's art as crystallographic teaching material. He praised the author for preparing the material in a detailed, crystallographically valid and didactically appealing way. Overall he stated that the book was a successful collaboration between the artist, author, publisher and the IUCr.

In 1976 an announcement in the IUCr's journals stated that the book was "extremely popular" and this had a necessitated a reprint in both the Netherlands and the U.S.A. In an obituary of the author it is stated that the publication of the book helped to popularise M. C. Escher's work in the U.S.A. MacGillavry's book inspired further work on the symmetry analysis of M. C. Escher's work, particularly by Doris Schattschneider in M. C. Escher: Visions of Symmetry.

== Editions ==
- First edition published for International Union of Crystallography by Oosthoek in 1965
- Second edition published for International Union of Crystallography by Bohn, Scheltema & Holkema in 1976
- Reprint edition with the title Fantasy & symmetry: the periodic drawings of M. C. Escher published by Harry N. Abrams in 1976
- Third edition published by International Union of Crystallography in 2017
