= Barbara Low (biochemist) =

American biochemist and biophysicist (1920–2019)

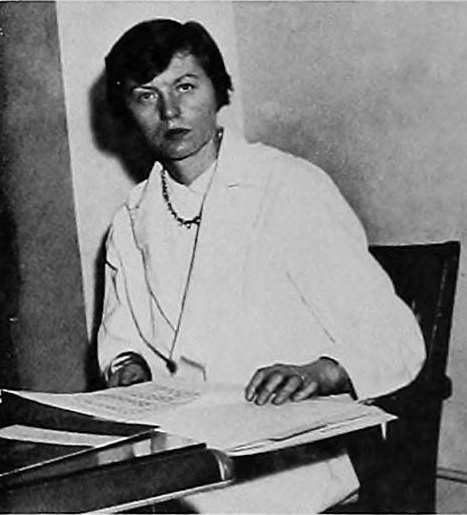
- Low in 1960
- Born: Barbara Wharton Low; March 23, 1920; Lancaster, England
- Died: January 10, 2019 (aged 98); Riverdale, Bronx, New York, US
- Education: B.A. (1943), M.A. (1946), D.Phil. (1948)
- Alma mater: Somerville College, Oxford
- Known for: Discovery of penicillin structure, discovery of pi helix
- Title: Professor of Biochemistry & Molecular Biophysics
- Partner: Metchie J. E. Budka
- Scientific career
- Fields: Biochemistry, Biophysics
- Workplaces: Columbia University
- Doctoral advisor: Dorothy Hodgkin
- Notable students: Frederic M. Richards, Helen M. Berman, Clara Shoemaker

Barbara Wharton Low (March 23, 1920 – January 10, 2019) was a biochemist, biophysicist, and a researcher involved in discovering the structure of penicillin and the characteristics of other antibiotics. Her early work at Oxford University with Dorothy Hodgkin used X-ray crystallography to confirm the molecular structure of penicillin, which at the time was the largest molecule whose structure has been determined using that method. Later graduate work saw her study with Linus Pauling and Edwin Cohn before becoming a professor in her own right. Low's laboratory would accomplish the discovery of the pi helix, investigate the structure of insulin, and conduct research into neurotoxins.

== Childhood and education ==
Low was born on March 23, 1920, in Lancaster, England, to her parents, Matthew Low and Mary Jane Wharton. She attended Park School in Preston. Her father Matthew Low was a fruit trader, who lived at Brook House on Inkerman St in Preston.

She undertook her tertiary education at Somerville College, Oxford, graduating with a bachelor's degree in 1943. That same year she began work under the biochemist Dorothy Hodgkin as a research assistant for the university's department of chemical crystallography. Due to Hodgkin's focus on protein crystallography, Low and her academic colleagues were engaged in researching the use of X-rays to determine the structure of crystallized proteins. Low obtained Master's and doctoral degrees in chemistry from Oxford University in 1946 and 1948 respectively, before moving on to a research associate position at the California Institute of Technology (Caltech). To do so, she obtained a United States passport through emigration and later full citizenship in 1956.

While at Caltech, she worked under Nobel Laureate Linus Pauling for a year before moving to another yearly research associate position at Harvard University working with Edwin Cohn. The following year, in 1950, Harvard offered Low her first academic appointment as assistant professor of biophysical chemistry at the newly created laboratory building for "fundamental studies of the makeup of body fluids and cells". She relocated to Columbia University in 1956 as an associate professor, and was promoted to a full professorship in 1966. Low continued at Columbia until her retirement in 1990 as professor emerita of biochemistry and molecular biophysics. She still did routine academic rounds as a "Special Lecturer" at the university, however, up until 2013.

== Career ==
Penicillin core

During Low's early work with the Hodgkin laboratory in the final years of World War II, she discovered the sulfur elemental components of penicillin that allowed for its mass production and later transformation into other antibiotic compounds. Up to that point, a pure sample of penicillin had not been successfully synthesized due to a lack of understanding of its physical structure of the compound, specifically the variation of its penam core. Due to the size of the molecule, only careful examination of the X-ray results allowed for any information on the overall construction, but the two finally completed the investigation in 1945. During this time, she was one of the first scientists in the United States to conduct studies of X-ray diffraction of crystalline proteins in a laboratory setting. At that time, it was the largest molecule ever to have had its structure determined by crystallography. Because the knowledge Low and Hodgkin obtained was of such importance and the research had been funded by the UK government, however, their work on penicillin remained classified for decades afterwards.

At Harvard, Low turned to topics she would continue in her later positions at Columbia University: the structure and composition of insulin and structural investigations into albumin crystals. Once her Columbia lab was established, Low also included research into neurotoxins on her schedule, including curare and its derivatives. The general protein studies from her lab resulted in 1952 with the discovery of the pi helix, a fundamental structural component of a significant number of proteins. Her X-ray crystallography images were used in 1953 to disprove the existence of "beta ice" as first claimed by Russian scientist N. Saljakov to be a different non-hexagonal form of ice.

As a member of the Columbia University committee on affirmative action, Low strongly believed in diversifying the faculty and workstaff at the university. She wished to help improve the standing of women in science and did so in one way by hiring and nurturing a large number of female graduate students in her lab.

== Honors and awards ==
Low received a fellowship for women scholars in 1946 from the American Association of University Women. This Rose Sidgwick Memorial Fellowship is specifically offered to women researchers in England to allow them to study in the United States and was awarded to Low for her work on the structure of penicillin. She was elected to the American Academy of Arts and Sciences in 1953.

== Personal life ==
Low identified herself as a Quaker and valued humanitarian work. At Somerville, she studied the Polish language and considered pursuing post-war aid in Poland. During her three-year assistantship, her leftist ideologies created conflict with Margaret Roberts, another student of Hodgkins who would later become Baroness Thatcher and, eventually, the Prime Minister of the United Kingdom. Her political views and affiliation with pro-world peace organizations rumored to have association with communist parties also created conflict with her standing as a U.S. citizen. Low was denied a U.S. visa until the 1950s, during which time she became a U.S. citizen. In 1950, Low married Harvard historian Metchie J. E. Budka. She was widowed in 1995 and spent her later years at her home in Riverdale, Bronx. She died on January 10, 2019, at the age of 98.

== Selected works ==
- Crowfoot, D.; Bunn, C. W.; Rogers-Low, B. W.; Turner-Jones, A. (1949). "XI. The X-Ray Crystallographic Investigation of the Structure of Penicillin". Chemistry of Penicillin. pp. 310–366. doi:10.1515/9781400874910-012. ISBN 978-1-4008-7491-0.
- Low, Barbara W.; Baybutt, R. B. (November 1952). "The π helix—a hydrogen bonded configuration of the polypeptide chain". Journal of the American Chemical Society. 74 (22): 5806–5807. doi:10.1021/ja01142a539.
- McGavin, A. Stewart; Einstein, J. Ralph; Low, Barbara W. (1962). "Insulin-Gross Molecular Structure: Trial-and-Error Studies Using Transform and Patterson Function Techniques". Proceedings of the National Academy of Sciences of the United States of America. 48 (12): 2150–2157. doi:10.1073/pnas.48.12.2150. JSTOR 71573. PMC 221137. PMID 16591028.
- Einstein, J. Ralph; McGavin, A. Stewart; Low, Barbara W. (1963). "Insulin-A Probable Gross Molecular Structure". Proceedings of the National Academy of Sciences of the United States of America. 49 (1): 74–81. Bibcode:1963PNAS...49...74E. doi:10.1073/pnas.49.1.74. JSTOR 71651. PMC 300631. PMID 16591042.
- Low, Barbara W.; Chen, Celia C. H. (1966). "Deamino-Oxytocin and 1-γ-Mercaptobutyric Acid-Oxytocin: X-ray Crystallographic Data". Science. 151 (3717): 1552–1553. Bibcode:1966Sci...151.1552L. doi:10.1126/science.151.3717.1552. JSTOR 1718065. PMID 5909592. S2CID 93916310.
- Low, Barbara W.; Lovell, F. M.; Rudko, Andrew D. (1968). "Prediction of α -helical Regions in Proteins of Known Sequence". Proceedings of the National Academy of Sciences of the United States of America. 60 (4): 1519–1526. Bibcode:1968PNAS...60.1519L. doi:10.1073/pnas.60.4.1519. JSTOR 59075. PMC 224949. PMID 5244757.
- Fullerton, W. Wardle; Potter, Reginald; Low, Barbara W. (1970). "Proinsulin: Crystallization and Preliminary X-Ray Diffraction Studies". Proceedings of the National Academy of Sciences of the United States of America. 66 (4): 1213–1219. Bibcode:1970PNAS...66.1213W. doi:10.1073/pnas.66.4.1213. JSTOR 59942. PMC 335808. PMID 5273450.
- Low, Barbara W.; Preston, Hugh S.; Sato, Atsushi; Rosen, Lawrence S.; Searl, James E.; Rudko, Andrew D.; Richardson, Jane S. (1976). "Three Dimensional Structure of Erabutoxin b Neurotoxic Protein: Inhibitor of Acetylcholine Receptor". Proceedings of the National Academy of Sciences of the United States of America. 73 (9): 2991–2994. Bibcode:1976PNAS...73.2991L. doi:10.1073/pnas.73.9.2991. JSTOR 65657. PMC 430904. PMID 1067597.
