= International Year of Crystallography =

2014 event for X-ray crystallography

The International Year of Crystallography (abbreviation: IYCr2014) was an event promoted in the year 2014 by the United Nations to celebrate the centenary of the discovery of X-ray crystallography and to emphasise the global importance of crystallography in human life.

UNESCO and the International Union of Crystallography (IUCr) are responsible for this event.

The opening ceremony of the International Year of Crystallography was held in Paris on 20 and 21 January 2014. Many activities followed to celebrate the International Year of Crystallography all over the world.

The event drew the attention of the BBC and the Spanish newspaper El País.

== Participating organisations ==
Most crystallographic organisation in the world are organizing different events. They include among others the International Union of Crystallography, the European Crystallographic Association, the American Crystallographic Association, the Turkish Crystallographic Association and the German Crystallographic Society, and the Crystallographic Society of Japan.

== Commemorative publications ==
Australia, Austria, Belgium, Great Britain, India, Israel, Italy, Liechtenstein, North Korea, Mexico, Moldavia, Poland, Portugal, Slovakia, Slovenia, South Korea and Switzerland issued special stamps for the occasion.
