= David Shoemaker =

American philosopher (born 1964)

- Born: 1964 (age 61–62)

Education
- Education: University of California, Irvine (PhD), Houghton College (BA)
- Doctoral advisor: Gary L. Watson
- Other advisor: Gregory S. Kavka

Philosophical work
- Era: 21st-century philosophy
- Region: Western philosophy
- Institutions: Cornell University (2021-), Tulane University (2007-2021), Bowling Green State University, California State University
- Website: https://sites.google.com/site/dshoemakr/home

David W. Shoemaker (born 1964) is an American philosopher who currently serves as the Wyn and William Y. Hutchinson Professor in Ethics and Public Life at Cornell University. He is known for his works on moral philosophy.

== Books ==
- Wisecracks: Humor and Morality in Everyday Life, forthcoming with University of Chicago Press 2024
- Responsibility from the Margins, Oxford University Press 2015
- Personal Identity and Ethics: A Brief Introduction, Broadview Press, 2009
