= Bulletin of the History of Archaeology =

Open-access peer-reviewed academic journal

- Discipline: Archaeology
- Language: English
- Edited by: Robert James Vigar, Artemis Papatheodorou, Hélène Maloigne, Sam Holley-Kline

Publication details
- History: 1991–present
- Publisher: Ubiquity Press
- Frequency: Biannually
- Open access: Yes

Standard abbreviations
- ISO 4: Bull. Hist. Archaeol.

Indexing
- ISSN: 1062-4740
- OCLC no.: 24683018

Links
- Journal homepage; Online access; Online archive

The Bulletin of the History of Archaeology is an open access, peer-reviewed academic journal publishing research, reviews, and short communications on the history of archaeology. It was established in May 1991 by Douglas Givens. It was edited for many years by Tim Murray, subsequently edited by Gabriel Moshenska between 2015-2023 and is now edited by four co-editors: Robert James Vigar, Artemis Papatheodorou, Hélène Maloigne and Sam Holley-Kline.
