= Chemistry International =

- Discipline: Chemistry
- Language: English

Publication details
- History: 1979–
- Open access: No

Standard abbreviations
- ISO 4: Chem. Int.

Indexing
- ISSN: 0193-6484 (print); 1476-4687 (web)

Links
- Journal homepage

Chemistry International is a news magazine published by the International Union of Pure and Applied Chemistry (IUPAC). According to its website, it was originally published in editions covering two months at a time. In 2017 the magazine began to be published quarterly, and as of 2022, the print edition was discontinued in favor of freely accessible online editions.
