= June Lindsey =

British-Canadian physicist (1922–2021)

- Born: June 7, 1922; Doncaster, England, U.K.
- Died: November 4, 2021 (aged 99); Ottawa, Ontario, Canada
- Education: University of Cambridge
- Known for: Structure of Adenine and Guanine
- Scientific career
- Fields: Crystallography
- Workplaces: University of Oxford; National Research Council
- Thesis: An X-ray investigation of certain sulphonates and purines. (1950)

June Monica Lindsey (née Broomhead, June 7, 1922 – November 4, 2021) was a British-Canadian physical chemist. Whilst working on X-ray crystallography at the University of Cambridge, Lindsey was influential in the elucidation of the structure of DNA. She solved the structures of the purines, adenine and guanine. Her depiction of intramolecular hydrogen bonds in adenine crystals was central to Watson and Crick's elucidation of the double helical structure of DNA.

== Education and early career ==
June Broomhead was born in Doncaster, England in June 1922. She joined the University of Cambridge, UK, in 1941. She completed the requirements for her degree in 1944, and joined the Cavendish Laboratory at the University of Cambridge. World War II forced her to leave her research career, however. She was encouraged to become a teacher and spent two years teaching science in a school. She returned to Cambridge in 1946.

She completed her undergraduate courses in 1944 at Newnham College, but Cambridge did not give women undergraduate degrees prior to 1948. She was awarded her bachelor's degree 50 years after earning it.

She solved the crystal structure of a complex of adenine and guanine. She delineated the shape and dimensions of the two nitrogenous subunits of DNA. She proposed that complementary nucleobases are bound together by hydrogen bonds, work that was expanded by Bill Cochran. Her research, particularly the prediction of hydrogen bonds, was researched and used by Watson and Crick to determine the structure of DNA. They created cardboard models based on the dimensions from Lindsey's crystal structures. Francis Crick worked opposite Lindsey at the University of Cambridge. They did not recognise the contributions of Lindsey in their discovery of the molecular structure of nucleic acids.

== Career ==
Lindsey was awarded her doctorate (Ph.D.) in 1950, and then moved to the University of Oxford where she worked as a postdoctoral scholar with Dorothy Hodgkin on Vitamin B_{12}. Lindsey moved to Canada in 1951. Before she left, Lawrence Bragg wrote to her requesting that she join him working on experimental and theoretical crystallography. In a letter, he wrote: “We badly need your hands to tackle knotty crystallographic problems, both experimental and theoretical. I wish all these things had come up while you were still with us; they would have been just in your line.”

She worked at the National Research Council Canada on the structure of codeine and morphine. Her husband, George Lindsey, was stationed in Montreal. Lindsey left her career in crystallography to look after her two children. They moved to Italy on a NATO mission in 1961.

Lindsey collected her bachelor's degree in 1998, over 50 years after completing it, when Cambridge granted Dr. Lindsey and 900 other "unofficial" female graduates their degrees earned prior to 1948.

=== Belated recognition ===
Alex MacKenzie, a pediatrician at the Children's Hospital of Eastern Ontario in Ottawa, who knew Lindsey as a family friend, asked her about her career. She told him about her 1940s work on crystallography, which inspired him to research her scientific contributions. MacKenzie was amazed by what he found and did not want her work to go unnoticed; it is "something we should shout from the mountaintops". He led the rediscovery of her contributions to the discovery of the double helix structure of DNA.

== Personal life ==
Lindsey died in Ottawa on November 4, 2021, at the age of 99. She was predeceased by her husband, George.
