= George Horsfield =

British architect and archaeologist

George Horsfield (1882–1956) was a British architect and archaeologist. He was Chief Inspector of Antiquities in Transjordan in 1928–36. Horsfield began the initial clearance and conservation of Jerash in 1925, and excavated at Petra with his future wife, Agnes Conway in 1929.

== Personal life ==
George Horsfield was born in Meanwood, Leeds, Yorkshire, England on 19 April 1882 to Richard Horsfield and his wife Sarah. He attended Leeds Grammar School and moved to London to train in architecture in the office of noted Gothic architect George Frederick Bodley. Horsfield then moved to the United States to work for the architectural firm Cram, Goodhue & Ferguson.

Horsfield returned to the UK in 1914 at the outbreak of war and volunteered for service in the Royal Naval Brigade. He saw action in the Gallipoli campaign in 1915, after which he was commissioned into the 7th West Yorkshire Regiment and took part in the Battle of the Somme in 1916. After contracting trench fever he was posted to India in 1918, attached to the Royal Engineers, and became the Chief Architect for Military Works, Rawalpindi, and Simla.

In 1923, Horsfield became a student at the recently established British School of Archaeology in Jerusalem. Its first Director, John Garstang, valued Horsfield's architectural background.

== Bibliography ==
- Thornton, A. 2009. George Horsfield, Conservation and the British School of Archaeology in Jerusalem. Antiquity Project Gallery.
- Wilson, E. 1906. Leeds Grammar School Admission Books, Vol. 14. Thoresby Society Publications.
- Who Was Who, 1951–1960. Horsfield, George. London: A. C. Black, p. 544.
- Evans, J. 1966. The Conways: A History of Three Generations. London: Museum Press.
