= Agnes Conway =

British archaeologist and historian

The Honourable Agnes Conway
- Born: Agnes Ethel Conway; 2 May 1885
- Died: 1950 (aged 64–65)
- Spouse: George Horsfield (m. 1932)

Academic background
- Education: Newnham College, Cambridge

Academic work
- Discipline: Archaeologist

Agnes Ethel Conway (2 May 1885 – 1950), later Agnes Horsfield, was a British writer, historian and archaeologist who worked in the Middle East from 1929 to 1936. Perhaps best known for her excavations at Petra and Kilwa, she also produced publications on the history of Allington Castle, which had been owned by the Wyatt family in the 16th century.

== Personal life ==
Agnes Conway was born in 1885 to William Martin Conway, who was, himself, an art historian, collector, explorer and politician, and Katrina Conway (née Lombard). She attended Baker Street High School and Kings College before becoming a student at Newnham College, Cambridge from 1903 - 1907.

After passing both parts of her History Tripos by 1907, Conway added to and catalogued her father's collection of photographs of objects, working with Eugenie Sellers Strong at the British School at Rome in 1912 on this project.

While working with him in Petra, Conway married George Horsfield, a fellow archaeologist, in St George's Cathedral in Jerusalem in January 1932. They lived together in Jerash until 1936, and then began to travel around the Mediterranean. Eventually, they returned to England and remained there until her death in 1950. She left her family papers to the medievalist and art historian Joan Evans, who eventually produced a volume on the family. These papers are now kept at the Cambridge University Library, having been presented by Evans in 1966.

== Career ==
Although Conway predominantly studied Ancient History for a History Tripos at Newnham College, Cambridge, she also studied Greek under Jane Ellen Harrison, acclaimed classist and then Lecturer in Classical Archaeology at Newnham.

Admitted as a student of the British School at Athens for the 1913/1914 session, Conway travelled widely in Greece and the Balkans in 1914 with a friend, Evelyn Radford, who had also attended Newnham. She published an account of the journey in 1917, titled "A Ride through the Balkans, on Classic Ground with a Camera". Her account placed photographs taken of refugees and the aftermath of the war alongside prose recounting her journey and encounters.

From 1917 to 1929, Conway worked on gathering materials representing women's work in the First World War as the chair of the Women's Work Sub-Committee of the newly established Imperial War Museum. She was the curator of the Women's Work Section of the Imperial War Museum, and was named Honorary Secretary of the Women's Committee between 1917 and 1920. As part of these activities she took part in a March 1919 tour of France and Belgium with the photographer Olive Edis.

Shortly after the war, Conway began studying in London at the Institute of Historical Research on the economic history of sixteenth-century England, a topic she returned to in later publications. Her father, Martin Conway, had bought Allington Castle in Kent in 1905, and begun a lengthy restoration of the castle in the following years. In this period, Conway published several articles relating to the castle and the Wyatt family.

Conway visited Petra for the first time in 1927, accompanying family friends on an extensive trip through the Middle East: Egypt, Palestine, Transjordan and Iraq. She contacted George Horsfield, Chief Inspector of Antiquities for the Transjordan Government, in order to find out more about the site; eventually becoming part of a team of archaeologists, including Horsfield, Tawfiq Canaan, a Palestinian physician, and Dr Detlief Nielsen, from Copenhagen, to explore Petra in detail in March 1929. Conway lectured on Petra at the Royal Geographical Society in 1930, in a talk titled Historical and Topographical Notes on Edom: With an Account of the First Excavations at Petra. She published a paper corresponding to the talk with the same title, also the first publication of any archaeological excavation at Petra, co-authored with George Horsfield. She and Horsfield published reports on the site during the 1930s and 40s.

In 1932, Conway visited Kilwa along with Horsfield and Nelson Glueck, then director of the American School of Oriental Research in Jerusalem. This five-day expedition produced a co-authored article from the three in 1933.

An archive consisting of hundreds of small personal photographs, some letters, postcards and excavation notes she and Horsfield produced while travelling and excavating is now kept at UCL's Institute of Archaeology. Conway is credited for the majority of photographs in the collection.

== Publications ==
=== Books ===
- (with Martin Conway) The Children's Book of Art (1909). London: Adam and Charles Black.
- A Ride Through the Balkans, on Classic Ground with a Camera (1917). London: R. Scott.
- (with a chapter by Edmund Curtis) Henry VII's relations with Scotland and Ireland, 1485-1498 (1932). Cambridge: Cambridge University Press.

=== Articles ===
- 'The Owners of Allington Castle, Maidstone (1086-1279)'. 1911. Archaeologia Cantiana. 29: 1-40.
- 'The Family of William Longchamp, Bishop of Ely, Chancellor and Juticiar of England, 1190—1191'. 1923. Archaeologia Cantiana. 36: 15–42.
- 'The Wyatt Mss. in the Possession of the Earl of Romney'. 1924. Bulletin of the Institute of Historical Research. 1 (3): 73–76. doi:10.1111/j.1468-2281.1924.tb01314.x. ISSN 0950-3471.
- 'The Maidstone Sector of Buckingham's Rebellion Act, Oct. 18, 1483'. 1925. Archaeologia Cantiana. 37:97-120.
- (with George Horsfield) 'Historical and Topographical Notes on Edom: with an account of the first excavations at Petra'. 1930. The Geographical Journal. 76 (5): 369–390. doi:10.2307/1784200
- (with George Horsfield and Nelson Glueck) 'Prehistoric Rock-Drawings in Transjordan'. 1933. The American Journal of Archaeology. 37 (3): 381–386. doi:10.2307/498950
- (with George Horsfield) Sela-Petra, The Rock of Edom and Nabatene I. The Topography of Petra. II. Houses. 1938. Quarterly of the Department of Antiquities of Palestine 7: 1–42.
- (with George Horsfield) Sela-Petra, the Rock, of Edom and Nabatene. III. Excavations. 1938. Quarterly of the Department of Antiquities of Palestine 8: 87–115.
- (with George Horsfield) Sela-Petra, the Rock, of Edom and Nabatene. IV. The Finds. 1942. Quarterly of the Department of Antiquities of Palestine 9: 105–204.
