= Mutford and Lothingland Rural District =

Former rural district in West Suffolk, England

Coordinates: 52.50°N 1.70°E

Mutford and Lothingland
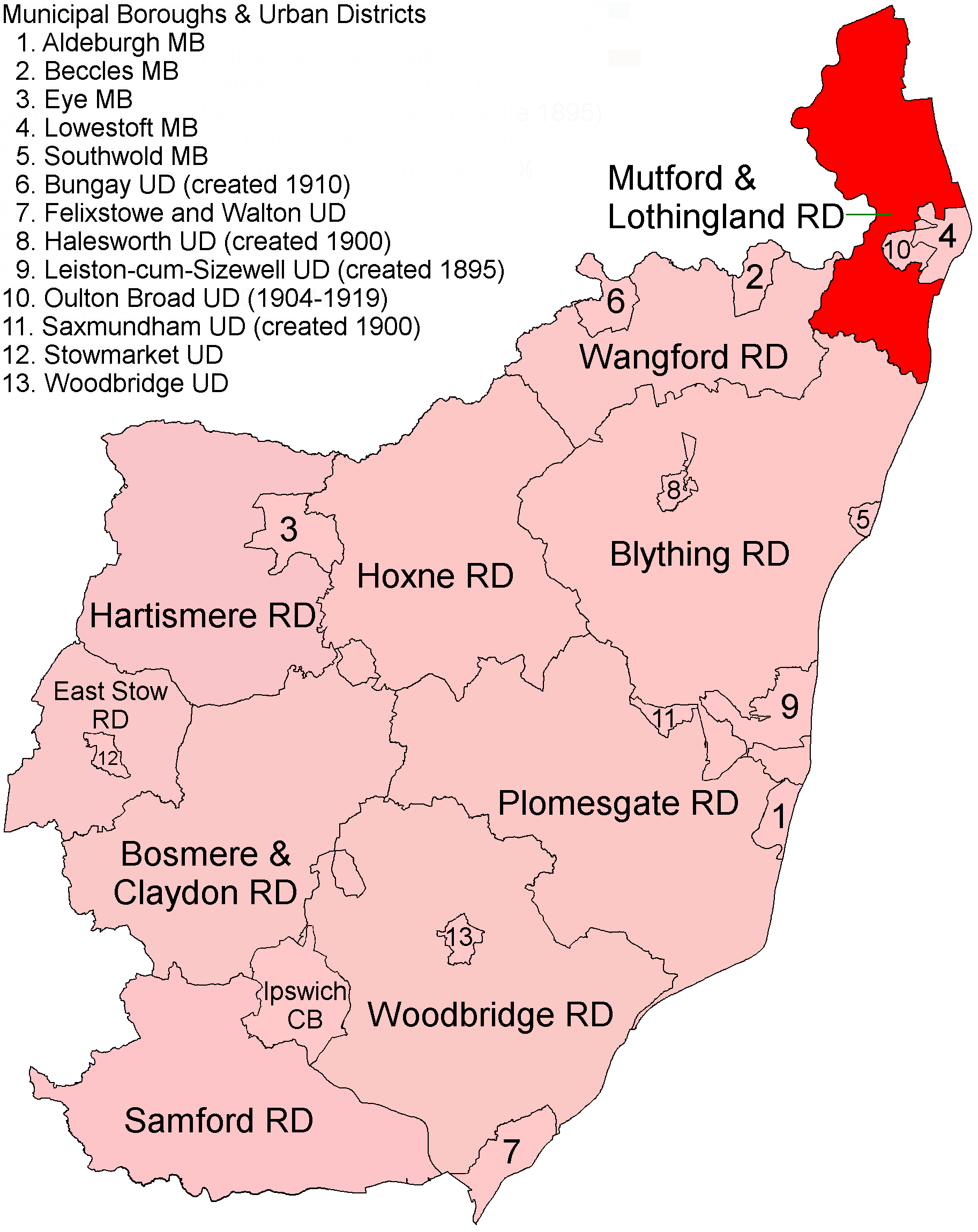
- Location within East Suffolk, 1894
- History
  - Created: 1894
  - Abolished: 1934
  - Succeeded by: Lothingland Rural District
- Status: Rural district

Mutford and Lothingland Rural District was a rural district within the administrative county of East Suffolk between 1894 and 1934. It was created out of the earlier Mutford and Lothingland rural sanitary district. It was named after the historic hundred of Mutford and Lothingland, whose boundaries it closely matched.

In 1904 a new Oulton Broad Urban District was created out of parts of Carlton Colville and Oulton parishes. Oulton Broad UD was absorbed by the Municipal Borough of Lowestoft in 1919.

In 1934, under a County Review Order, Mutford and Lothingland Rural District was abolished and its parishes transferred to the new Lothingland Rural District, apart from Gunton and some part parishes which were added to Lowestoft MB. In 1974 the area was divided between the new districts of Great Yarmouth (in Norfolk) and Waveney in Suffolk.

== Statistics ==
Year	Area		Population	Density (pop/ha)
Year	acres	ha	Population	Density (pop/ha)
1911	28,171	11,401	11,184	0.98
1921	28,171	11,401	11,865	1.04
1931	28,171	11,401	11,996	1.05

== Parishes ==
Mutford and Lothingland RD contained the parishes of Ashby, Barnby, Belton, Blundeston, Bradwell, Burgh Castle, Carlton Colville, Corton, Flixton, Fritton, Gisleham, Gunton, Herringfleet, Hopton on Sea, Kessingland, Lound, Mutford, Oulton, Pakefield, Rushmere and Somerleyton.
