= Lothingland Rural District =

Former rural district in East Suffolk, England

Coordinates: 52.44°N 1.71°E

Lothingland
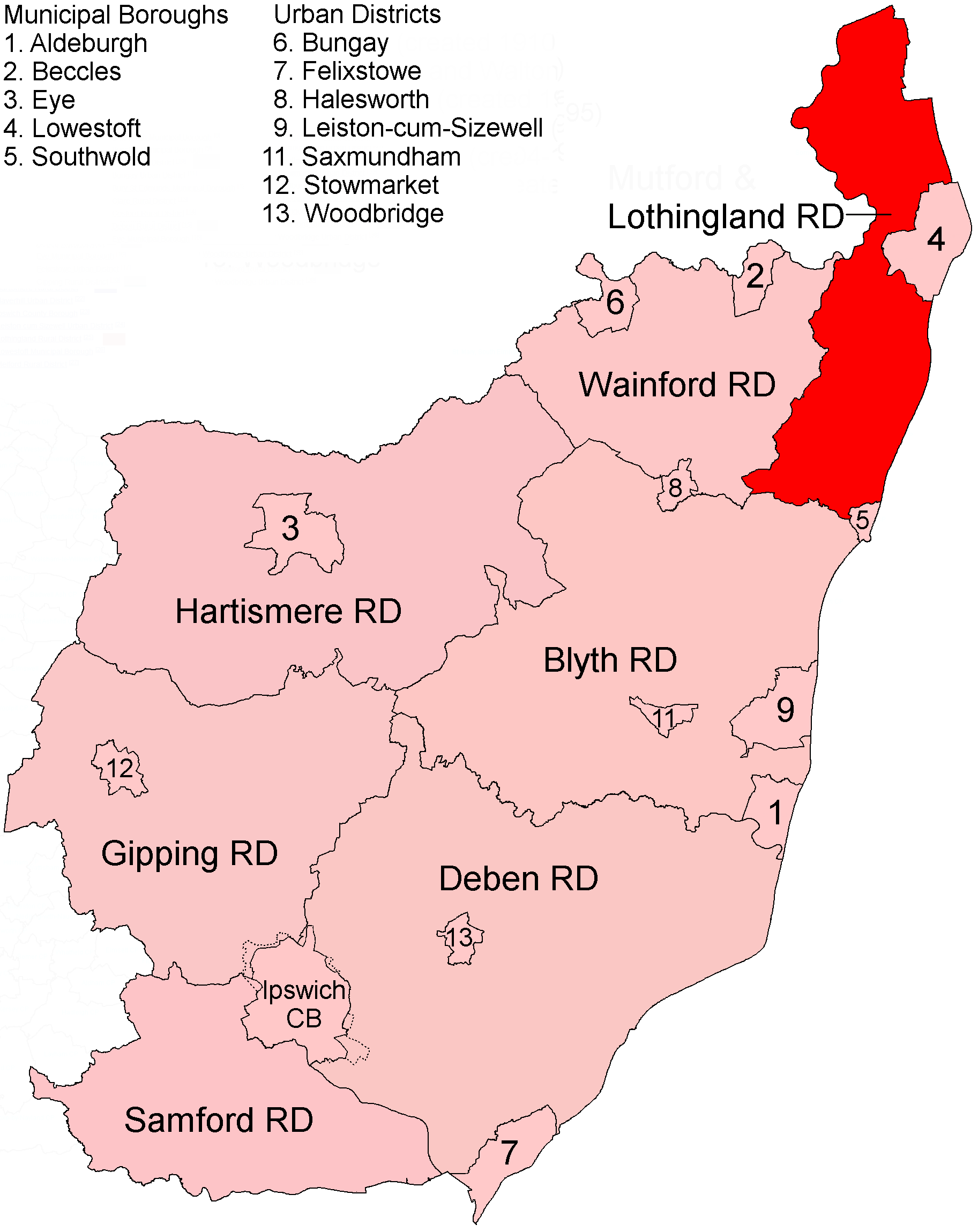
- Location within East Suffolk, 1934
- History
  - Created: 1934
  - Abolished: 1974
  - Succeeded by: Waveney; Great Yarmouth
- Status: Rural district

Lothingland was a rural district in East Suffolk, England, named after the ancient half-hundred of Lothingland which was merged with Mutford half-hundred in 1763 to form Mutford and Lothingland.

The rural district was formed in 1934 by the merger of most of Mutford and Lothingland Rural District along with part of Blything Rural District, both of which were being abolished. It covered a coastal area between Great Yarmouth and Lowestoft.

The district was administered from offices in Rectory Road, Lowestoft. The site is now occupied by Kingswear Court.

The district was abolished in 1974 under the Local Government Act 1972, and split between the new districts of the borough of Great Yarmouth (in Norfolk) and Waveney (in Suffolk).

== Statistics ==
Year	Area		Population	Density (pop/ha)
Year	acres	ha	Population	Density (pop/ha)
1951	44,675	18,080	14,716	0.81
1961	44,675	18,080	16,034	0.89

== Parishes ==
Parishes formerly in Blything RD: Benacre, Covehithe, Easton Bavents, Frostenden, Henham, Henstead, Reydon, South Cove, Uggeshall, Wangford, Wrentham.

Formerly in Mutford and Lothingland RD: Ashby, Barnby, Belton, Blundeston, Bradwell, Burgh Castle, Carlton Colville, Corton, Flixton (Lothingland), Fritton, Gisleham, Herringfleet, Hopton on Sea, Kessingland, Lound, Mutford, Oulton, Rushmere, Somerleyton.
