= Mutford and Lothingland Hundred =

Historical division of Suffolk, England

Coordinates: 52.5°N 1.7°E

Mutford and Lothingland was a hundred of Suffolk, with an area of 33,368 acres (135.04 km^{2}). Lowestoft Ness, the most easterly point of Great Britain fell within its bounds.

Мutford and Lothingland Hundred formed the north-eastern corner of Suffolk. Around five miles (8.0 km) wide, but fifteen miles (24 km) from north to south it was bounded by Norfolk to the north and west, and the North Sea to the east, other than the strip of land occupied by Great Yarmouth. Its border with Norfolk was formed by the River Waveney as it bends north on its final approaches to the sea, and Breydon Water. It was separated to the south by the appropriately named Hundred River from the hundreds of Wangford and Blything.

The parishes of Belton with Browston, Bradwell, Burgh Castle and Hopton-on-Sea, historically in Suffolk, were moved to Great Yarmouth district in Norfolk in 1974 following the changes of the Local Government Act 1972.

The southern part of the hundred was formerly the Half Hundred of Mutford, comprising the parishes of Barnby, Carlton Colville, Gisleham, Kessingland, Kirkley, Mutford, Pakefield, and Rushmere. It was separated from Lothingland by Oulton Broad and Lake Lothing through which the River Waveney formerly flowed to reach the sea. The northern Half Hundred of Lothingland was merged with that of Mutford in 1763.

Listed as Ludingaland in the Domesday Book of 1086, Lothingland is named after Lake Lothing, which in turn probably refers to a tribe or family named Luthings. The name Mutford, taken from the village of the same name, may mean "ford near the meeting of the streams", from the Anglo-Saxon mutha meaning mouth of a river. If this is correct, the ford in question is presumably that where a stream enters the Hundred River in the grounds of Mutford Hall.

== Parishes ==
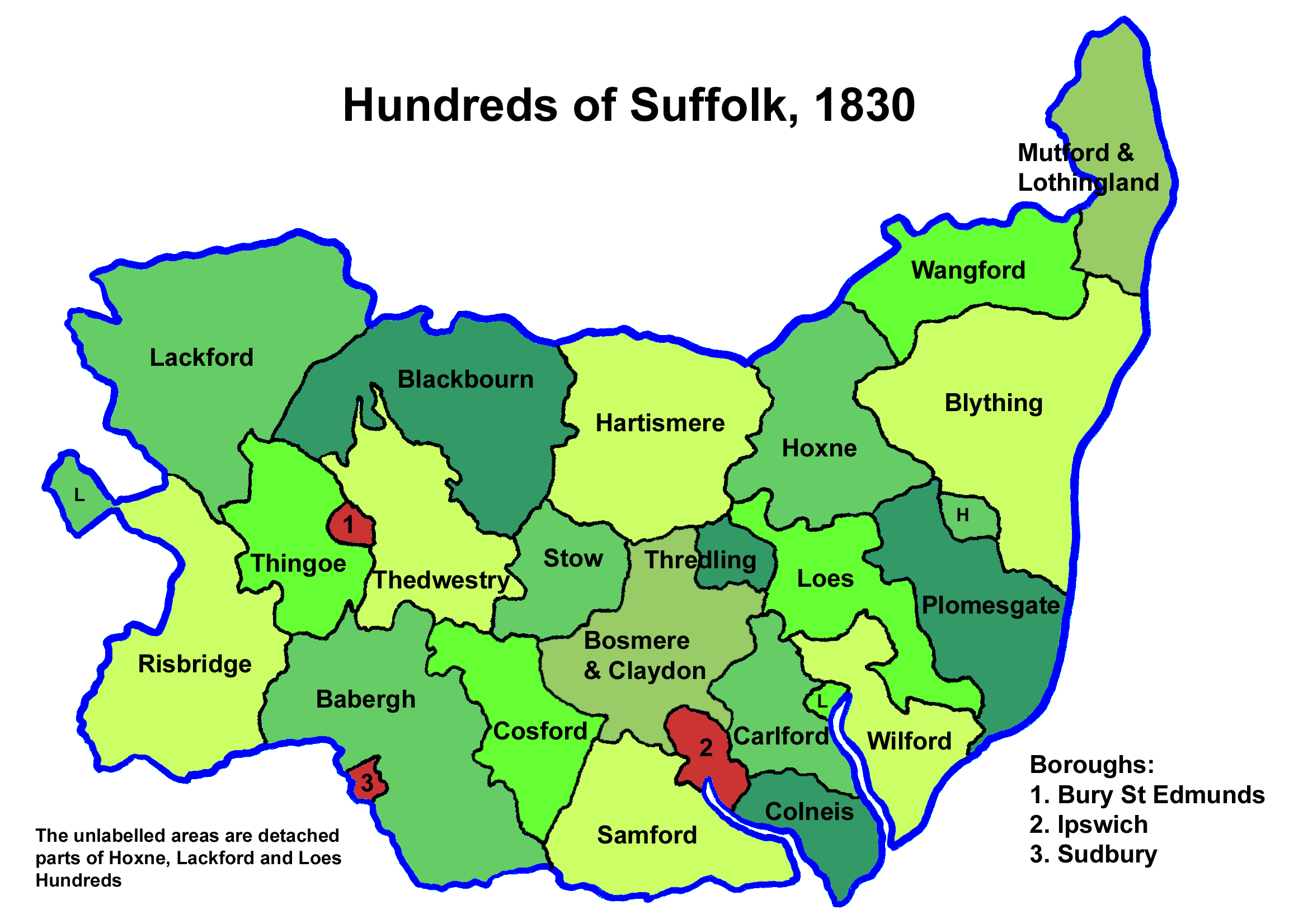
Suffolk hundreds

Mutford and Lothingland Hundred consisted of the following 24 parishes:

Parish	Area (acres)
Ashby	1045
Barnby	1029
Belton with Browston	2009
Blundeston	1573
Bradwell	2295
Burgh Castle	1497
Carlton Colville	2780
Corton	1180
Flixton	602
Fritton	1478
Gisleham	1344
Gorleston	1335
Gunton	862
Herringfleet	1309
Hopton-on-Sea	1267
Kessingland	1616
Kirkley	514
Lound	1242
Lowestoft	1486
Mutford	1499
Oulton	1979
Pakefield	670
Rushmere	780
Somerleyton	1380
South Town	597

== See also ==
- Lothingland
- Lothingland Rural District
