= Charles Burrell & Sons =

British manufacturer (1770–1928)

Charles Burrell & Sons Ltd
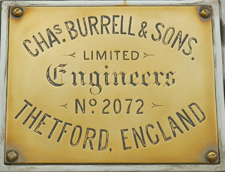
- Type: Limited Liability Company
- Industry: Agricultural Engineering
- Founded: 1770
- Defunct: 1928
- Successor: Richard Garrett & Sons
- Headquarters: Thetford, Norfolk, England
- Products: Showmans Locomotives; Traction Engines; Road Rollers; Portable Engines

Charles Burrell & Sons were builders of steam traction engines, agricultural machinery, steam lorries and steam tram engines. The company was based in Thetford, Norfolk, and operated from the St Nicholas works on Minstergate and St Nicholas Street, some of which survives today.

At their height they employed over 350 people and were the largest employer within the town. The company became known for producing reliable and good-looking traction engines which were always built to customers' requirements. The company declined after the First World War when internal combustion engines started to become a cheaper alternative to steam power. The company finally closed in 1928, with the final engines being built by Richard Garrett & Sons at Leiston, Suffolk.

== History ==
=== 1770 to 1847: Early years ===
In 1770 a Joseph Burrell, a master smith, established a small forge in Thetford, for the manufacture and repair of agricultural implements. In 1801 a Joseph Burrell was found to be advertising "Chaff Engines, Drill Rolls and Drill Machines", items of agricultural equipment, from his foundry on Kings Street Thetford. By 1805 Joseph had joined with his two brothers James and William and were advertising Threshing Machines for sale. In 1817 Charles Burrell was born. Charles was James Burrell's third child. William Burrell died in 1822 and Joseph died in 1831. The sole surviving brother James inherited the business; five years later he died, and control of the business passed to his son and Joseph's nephew, Charles, in 1836 when he was only 19 years old.

=== 1848 to 1906: Growth with steam ===
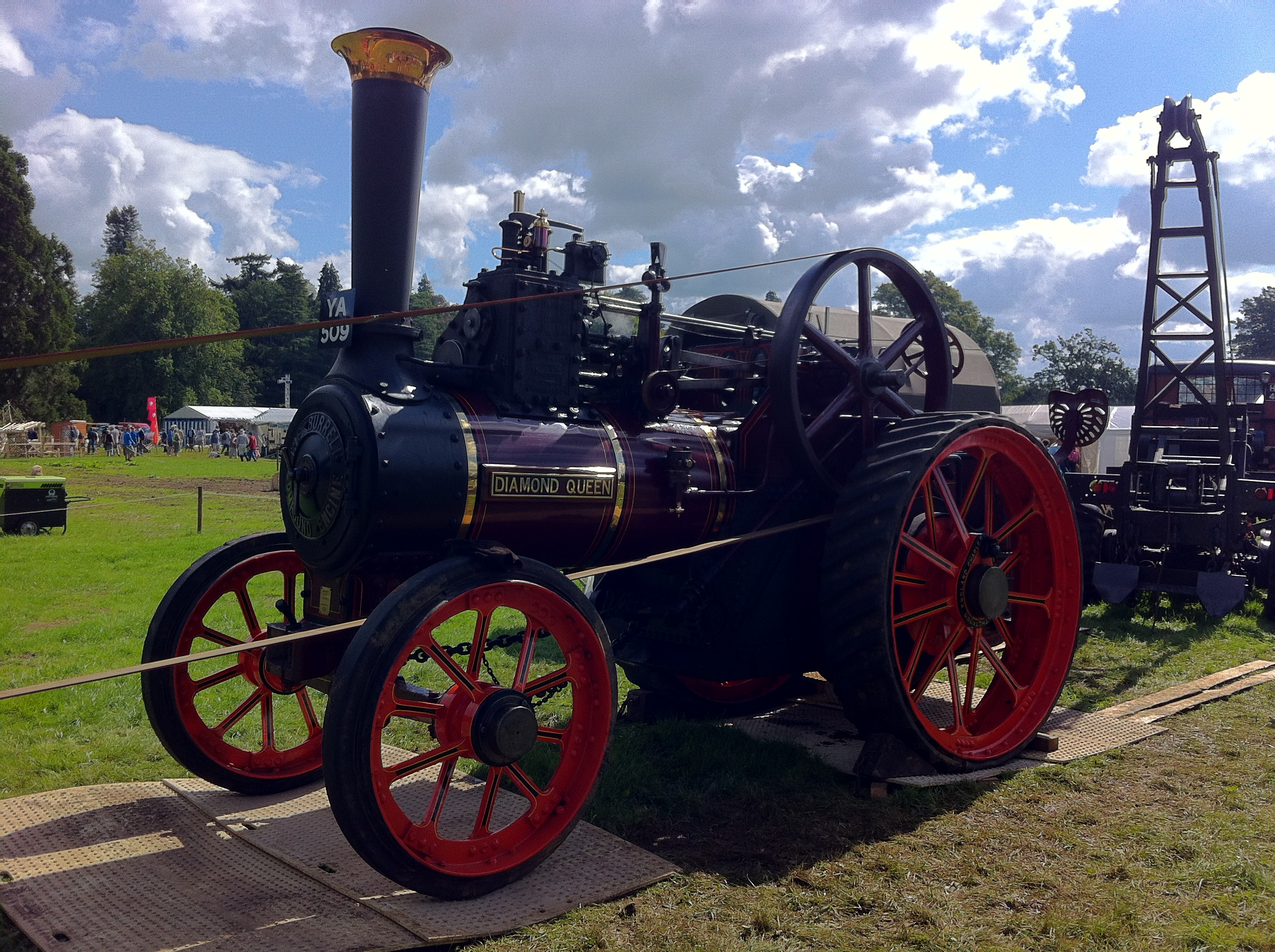
Diamond Queen traction engine, manufactured by Charles Burrell & Sons, 1897

Charles Burrell built the company's first steam engine in 1848. Initially like most other manufacturers they built portable engines but they gradually moved into self-moving agricultural engines and later engines built specifically for road transport. In 1856 they built the first road haulage engine in conjunction with James Boydell. Boydell had invented a system where flat boards were attached to a wheel loosely at their centers, as the wheels revolved they were capable of spreading the weight of an engine over the surface of the board, versions of these became known as Dreadnaught Wheels. The wheels were not unlike the continuous track used in tanks today.

The company was converted to a Limited Liability Company in 1884. In 1906 Charles Burrell died at his home St. Mary's House on Bury Road in Thetford. His son Robert, a talented engineer, had died two years earlier in 1904. The success of the company was undoubtedly due to the fine partnership between Charles and his three sons, Frederick, Robert and Charles Jnr. In 1900 after 64 years control of the company was handed over by Charles to his third son Charles Jnr who ran day-to-day operations until the company's closure.

=== 1907 to 1913: At their height ===
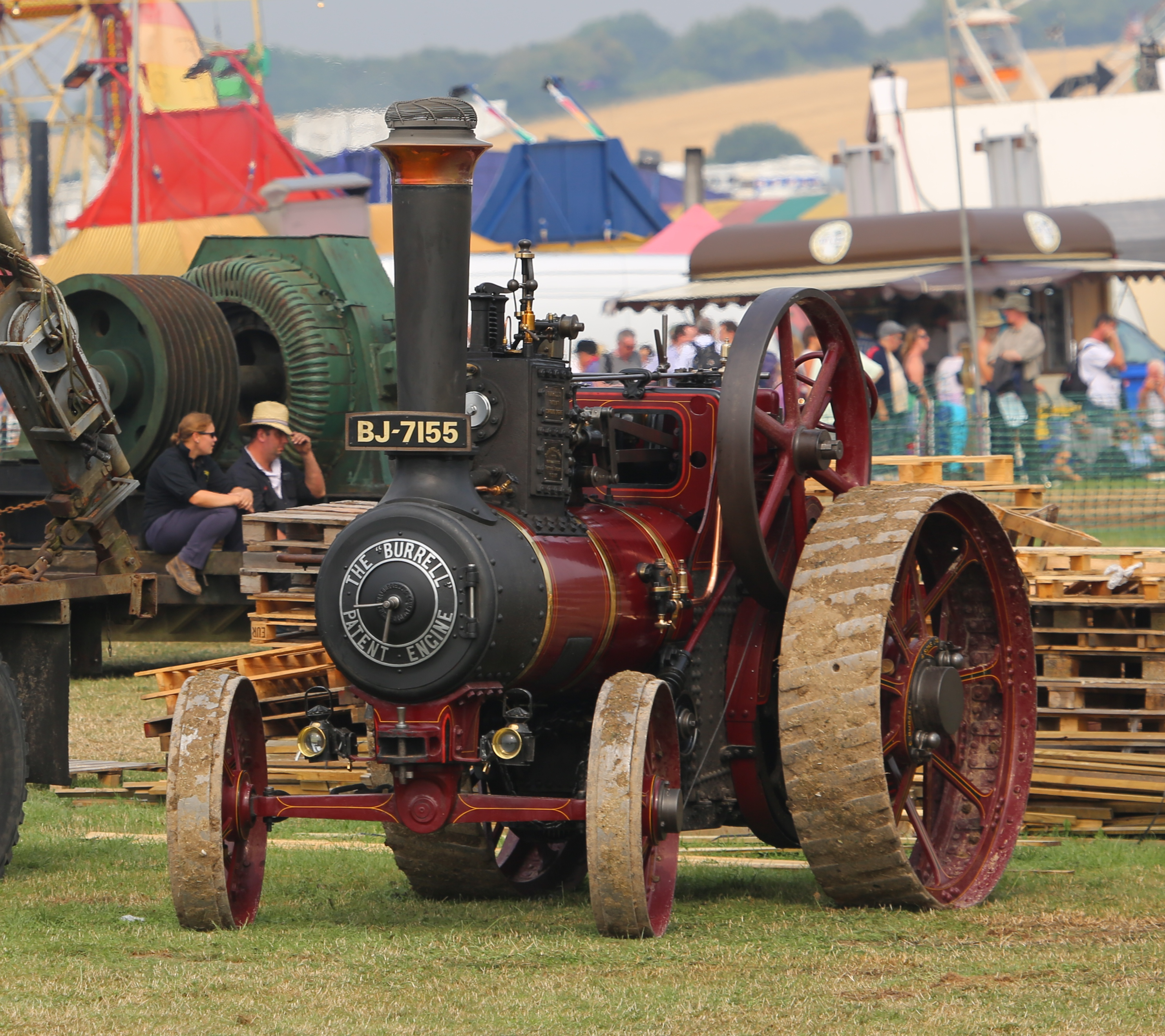
A 1909 Burrell general purpose engine

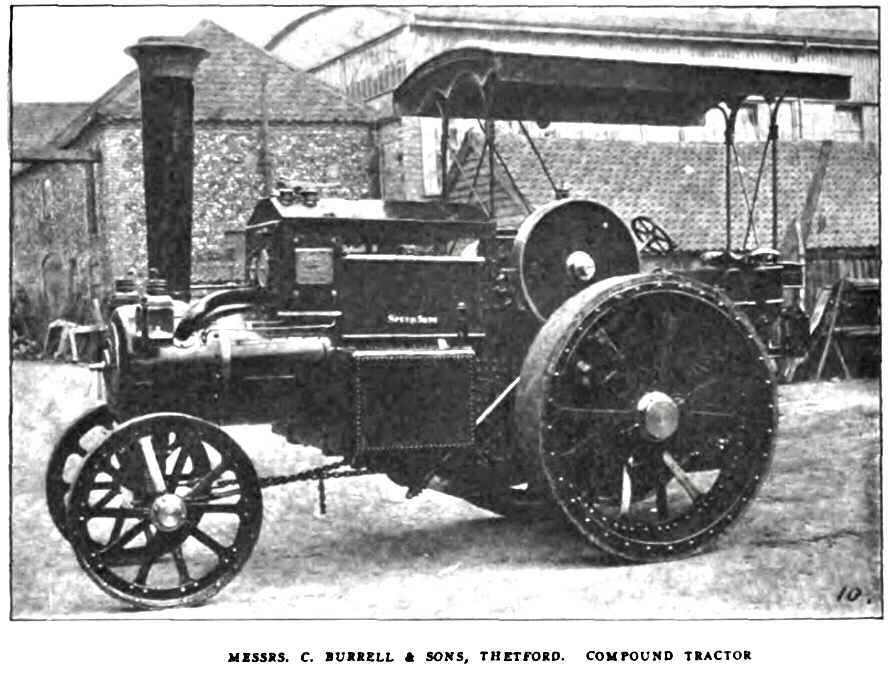
Charles Burrell & Sons (1909)

Production grew gradually throughout the early 20th century; this culminated in 1913, the company's most successful year, with over 104 engines completed in 12 months. Construction of portable engines ended in 1908. By this time the company was focusing on the production of traction engines for agricultural use and engines built for the needs of traveling showmen.

=== 1914 to 1918: First World War ===
Like many engineering companies at the time, production was turned over during the First World War to the construction of various munitions, some of which survive to this day. Engine production continued, however, and a large number of engines left the factory despite the war effort.

=== 1919 to 1932: AGE and decline ===
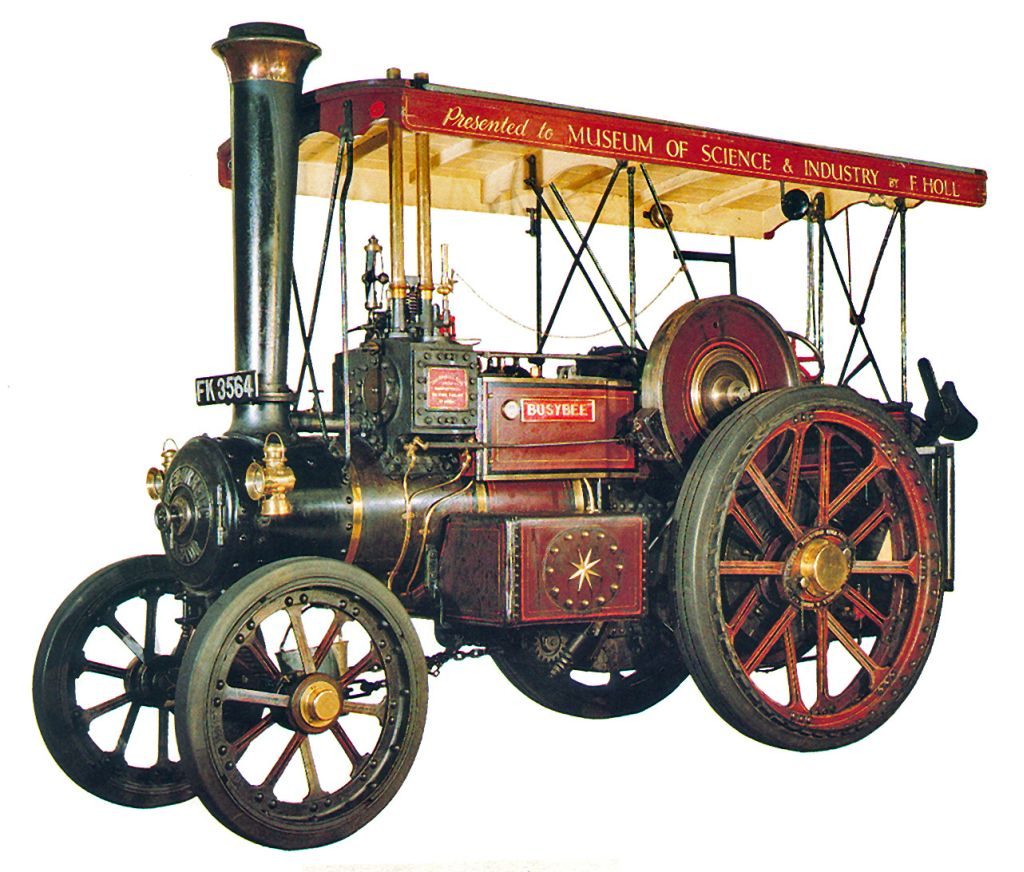
Burrell 'Busy Bee' Steam Tractor.

Sales declined after the war had ended, and these were difficult years for the company. The company suffered resulting from the economic situation but also from increased competition from other manufacturers. The depression caused many orders for equipment worn out during the war to be cancelled, to compound this there was a glut of secondhand engines which had been produced for war use that were being sold cheaply to showmen and haulage contractors, two of the company's key markets. For a time the workforce at the St Nicholas Works was reduced to a four-day week. In 1919 Burrell joined the formation of the Agricultural & General Engineers (AGE). Like many of the companies who joined, this proved to be a disastrous move. 1923 and 1924 showed an improvement in sales but by this time the writing was on the wall with other technologies coming to the fore. On 4 June 1928 the company closed its doors at Thetford for good, with the final engines being built at Leiston by Richard Garrett & Sons.

The original plans to many of the Burrell engines are held privately by the Palmer family of Haughley in Suffolk through the marriage of Mrs Annie Palmer to Mr Thomas Doran whom with his brother founded Doran Bros of Thetford at Haughley House in Croxton Road, Thetford.

Around 330 Burrell engines survived into preservation. The first Burrell reunion rally took place in 1972 with 30 Burrell engines in the programme.

== Products ==
=== Portable engines ===
The first portable engine produced by Charles Burrell & Sons and their first steam engine of any kind was completed in 1846. This engine survived in a derelict form in the St Nicholas works yard until the 1920s before being scrapped. Three engines of this early design with wrought iron boilers were produced and exhibited at the RASE show in the late 1840s. Following this development was rapid and in only five years by 1851 the design of portable engines had matured into a form that was to remain unaltered for the rest of the steam era. Portable engines were very simple with no gearing connected to the road wheels, no tanks were fitted, water was drawn to the engine from a barrel placed alongside, and the majority had single cylinders; however compound versions were produced. Charles Burrell & Sons produced portables in a range of sizes, these were rated by the company in NHP.

Around 670 portable engines were completed by the firm; however by the turn of the 20th century production of portables had slowed to a crawl as the company became more occupied with production of self-moving steam engines, and the final portable engine was sold in 1908.

=== Steam tractors ===
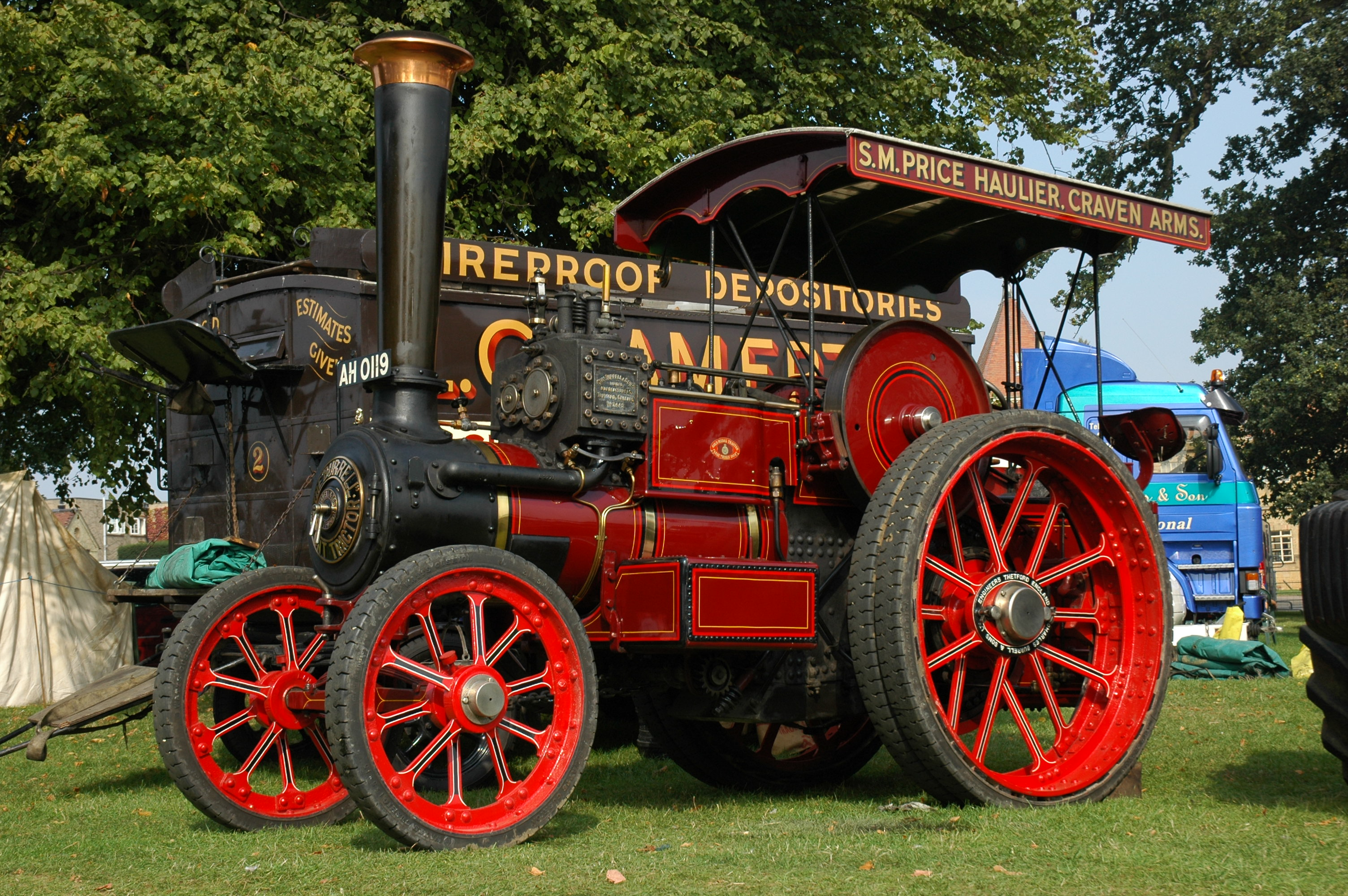
Charles Burrell & Sons 1913 'Gold Medal' Steam Tractor now in preservation

The first Burrell steam tractor was produced in 1905 following changes in Parliamentary legislation which allowed one-man operation of traction engines on the public highway, engines however could weigh no more than five tons unladen and were limited to a top speed of 5 mph (8.0 km/h). The prototype steam tractor was a single-cylinder design but in 1906 a compound-cylinder version was produced, and this proved to be by far the most popular version with customers.

In 1908 the RAC organised a trial of competing makers' steam tractors to ascertain the best. Charles Burrell & Sons entered engine number 2932, a standard example of their range, but this engine was fitted with special patented wheels constructed of steel but with wooden blocks on the outer rim. After 22 days and 686 miles (1,104 km) Burrell's entry was declared the winner. From this point onwards tractors produced by the firm became known as "Burrell Gold Medal Tractors".

Charles Burrell & Sons also added showmans fittings or forward mounted cranes to their tractors. In all 11 were sold new to amusement caterers, with at a further 5 receiving showmans fittings by external companies and 6 engines were supplied new to the War Department with a 2-ton capacity crane fitted. In 1923 road legislation was changed again, and engines up to 7 1/4 tons were allowed to be operated on the road by a single operative. In response the company designed a larger steam tractor to service this new market, but it came too late for Charles Burrell & Sons, who by this time were in financial trouble and only three of this type of engine were completed. Burrell's five-ton tractors found much favour with haulage contractors, quarry owners, timber hauliers, the military and amusement caterers, generally working with the use of a similar-sized trailer. After a production run of 20 years with over 200 engines completed, the final steam tractor was supplied in 1927.

=== Road locomotives ===
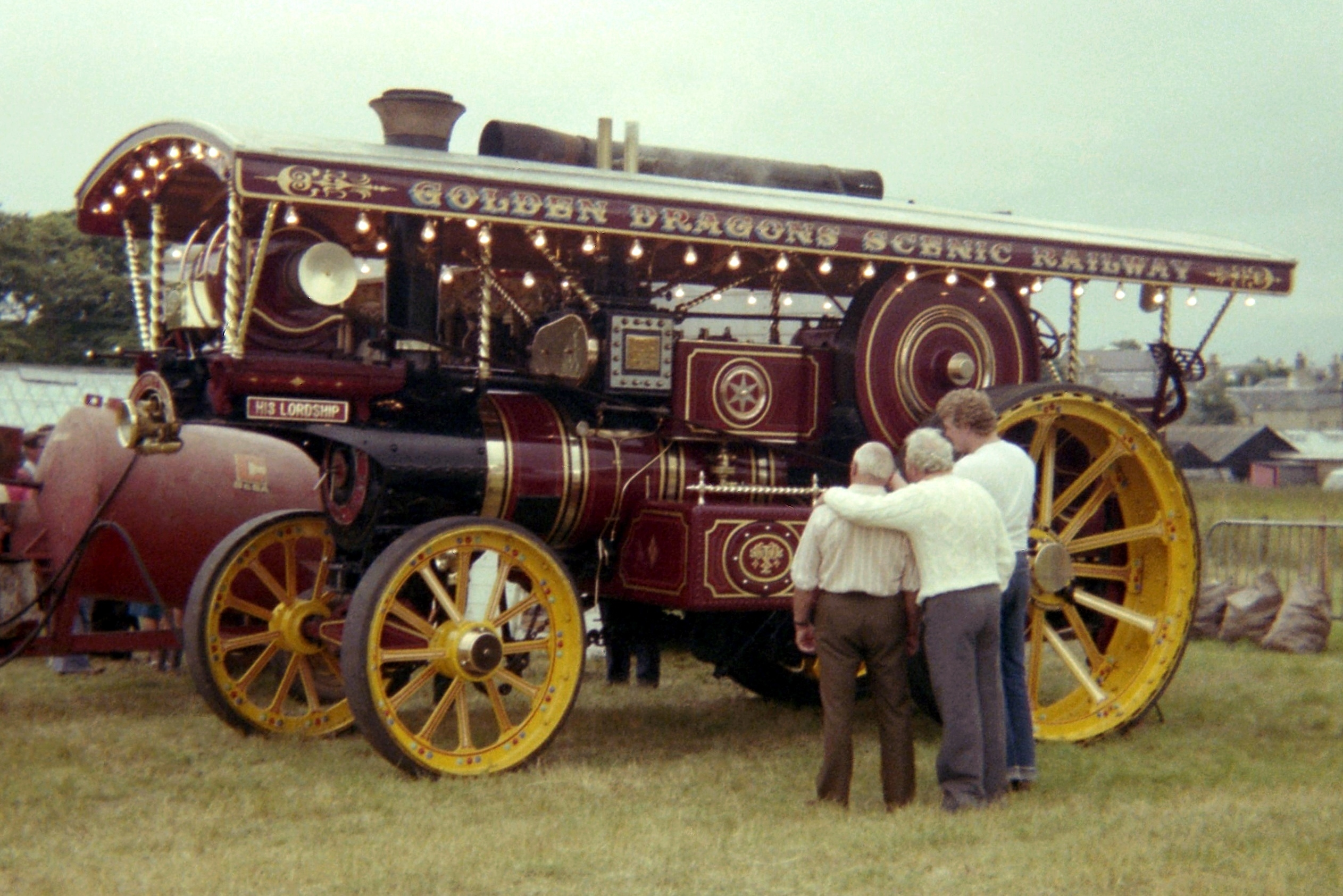
His Lordship, Burrell Showman's road locomotive, in the Tom Varley collection. 1970s photo.

The first road locomotives started to emerge from the St Nicholas works in the late 1870s, with 14 engines specifically designed for the job of road haulage produced between 1878 and 1890. Following the changes to the law made by the Locomotives on Highways Act 1896 the market for road locomotives expanded considerably. Charles Burrell & Sons road locomotives were slightly modified versions of their general-purpose engines to allow for faster rates of travel over long journeys. A general-purpose engine was designed to spend much of its life stationary, powering belt-driven equipment, whereas a road locomotive was constantly on the move, therefore subtle design differences were needed. These modifications included stronger drive shafts, gears and wheels; additional water-carrying capacity; generally a canopy was fitted; solid flywheels and additional platework around the engine's cylinder motion.

Loads hauled could be anything that could be carried in accompanying wagons, this included coal, bricks, stone, timber, grain etc. During the late 18th to early 19th century it was not uncommon for road locomotives to haul up to three fully laden wagons of 10 tons each, but as smaller steam engines became more common, the use of multiple wagons became infrequent – the use of road locomotives shifting to the movement of indivisible loads such as boilers, marine engine parts, railways engines or electrical equipment.

The largest engine produced by Charles Burrell & Sons was a road locomotive produced for William Kerr of Mavisbank in Glasgow. Works number 3419, the engine was named "Clyde" and completed in October 1912. Clyde was a special order, built specifically for the haulage of enormous loads across the west of Scotland. Following many years of service the engine was sold at the end of the Second World War and driven away from Kerr's yard in Glasgow by a young man and his wife and never seen again - it is believed that the engine was broken-up shortly after in a Tyneside breakers yard.

=== Road rollers ===
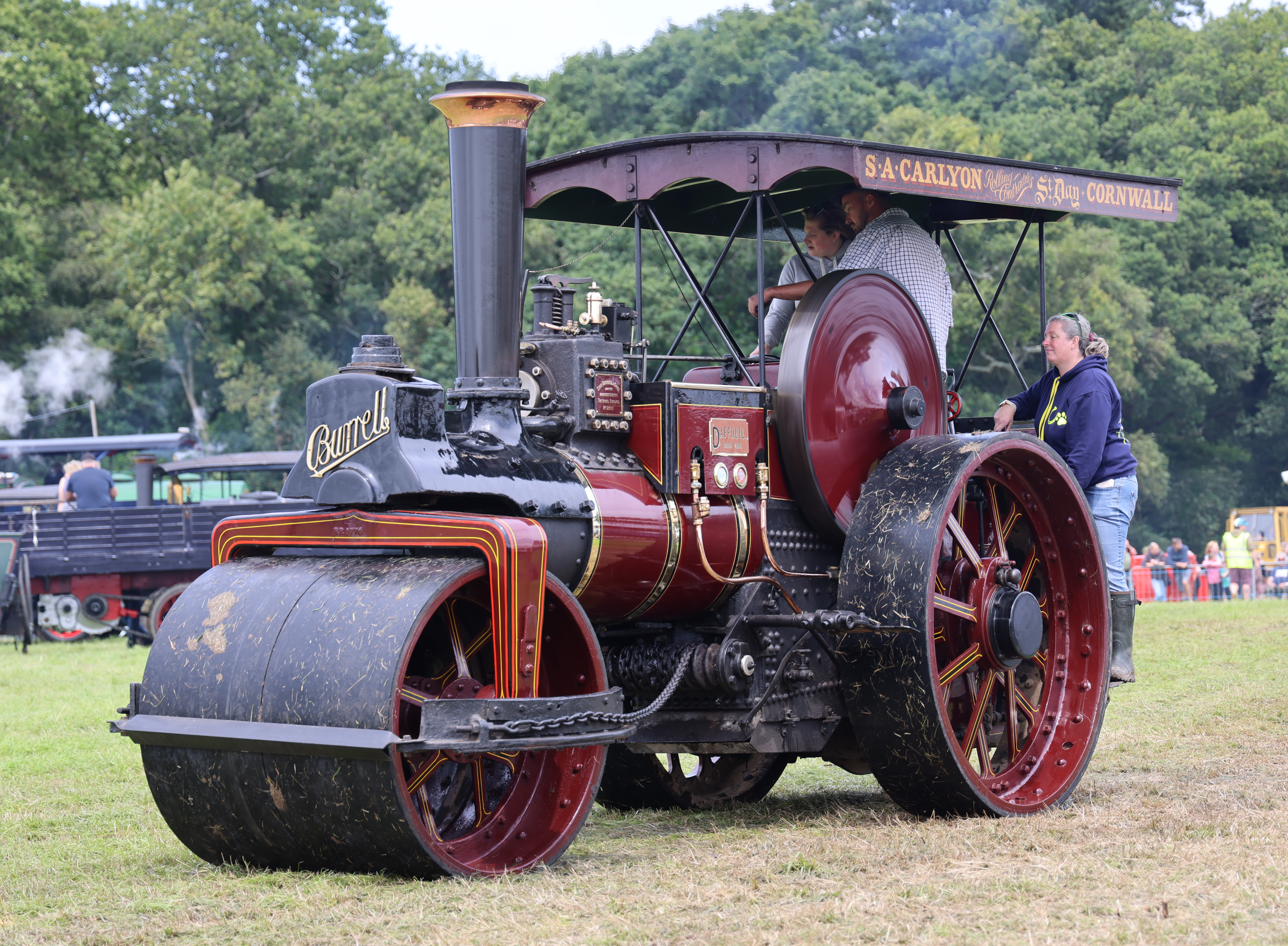
Burrell A class 5NHP roller from 1924

Burrell's made their first road roller in 1891 which was supplied to a local contractor close to Roudham, Norfolk. Production increased gradually until the turn of the century when there was regular demand for new machines. Burrell road rollers were a very conventional design and changed little in their total run of production. Five different sizes of rollers were available, 6 ton, 8 ton, 10 ton (class A), 12 ton (class B), 14 ton (class C) all available with additional extras, for example scarifiers which broke up the road surface prior to re-laying. In total the company built 384 road rollers in a variety of sizes and configurations with a number of engines converted to rollers at a later date. The final roller was despatched in 1929 to Mutford & Lothingland Rural District Council in Suffolk.

=== Ploughing engines ===
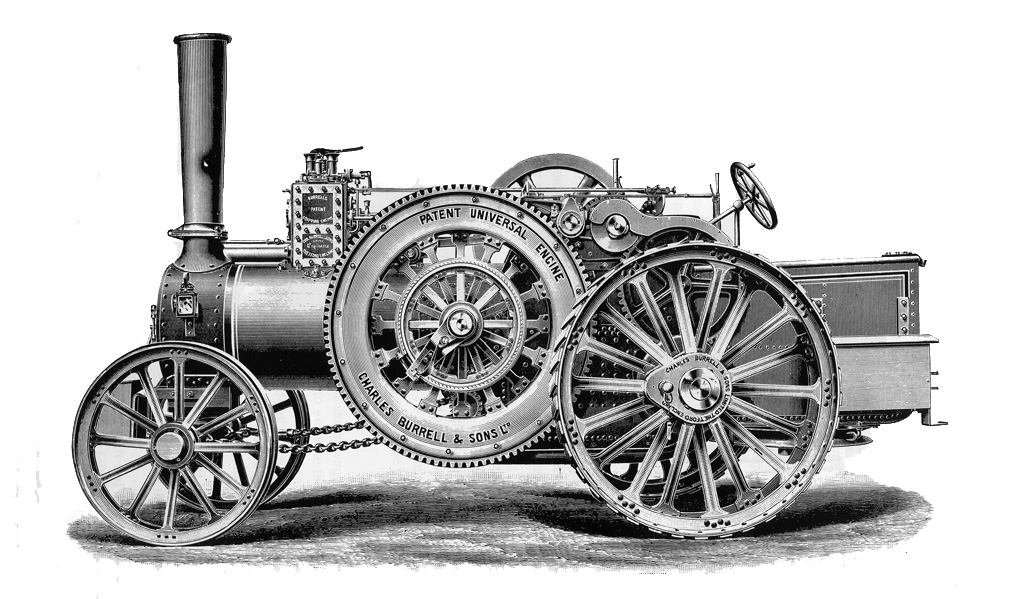
Burrell Universal type Ploughing Engine line drawing as used in Burrell advertising material.

Charles Burrell started building ploughing engines from as early as 1860 in the very infancy of steam ploughing. These engines were built under license from John Fowler & Co who had patented the system of steam cultivation with two engines several years earlier. These early engines were very similar to the Kitson and Hewitson design of ploughing engine with the exception of the drive to the rear wheels which was via chain. In addition Burrell produced, again under licence from Fowler, a range of implements for cable ploughing including balance ploughs, turn-about cultivators and a patented small cultivator for use on light land with a single engine. Despite these early exploits and the company having extensive interests in producing engines for agricultural purposes Burrell paid scant attention to the construction of ploughing engines. All told the company produced 142 ploughing engines between 1860 and 1914 when the final pair of engines was completed for a customer in Germany. Early engines were often chain driven but later engines were gear driven speciality order engines for overseas customers.

Burrell also experimented with a system whereupon the winding drum was mounted vertically on the boiler; this had the advantage that external stresses placed on the boiler were much reduced over the standard means of mounting the drum on the underside of an engine's boiler. This system was first patented by two agricultural engineers from nearby Fakenham, Percival Everitt and William John Adams. By arrangement Burrells built ploughing engines incorporating the Everitt and Adams winding drum arrangement and engines were supplied either as a pair with left and right drums or singly with a double drum for use with supplied roundabout tackle. In 1881 Everitt and Adams transferred commercial rights for the system to Burrell for royalties of £5 per engine sold, this type of engine then became known as Universal Type Ploughing Engines. This pattern of side drum mounting was never widely adopted and most of the limited number of engines produced were sold overseas.

A single set of Burrell ploughing engines have survived into preservation, comprising works numbers 776 & 777 built for a customer in West Sussex and completed in June 1879. After several owners in preservation the engines passed to the Museum of East Anglian Life in Stowmarket, Suffolk and occasionally appear at local events demonstrating steam ploughing.

=== Steam wagons ===
A heavily restored 1915 Burrell Double chain steam wagon

Charles Burrell & Sons produced their first steam wagon in 1901, however it appears that this experimental engine never went into production and was retained by the company for their own use. It was not until 1911 that they made a serious attempt to enter what was now a growing market. The Burrell wagons generally followed the design used by market leader Foden of Sandbach and several revisions were produced when Foden had established an improved design. Overall the company produced around 120 overtype steam wagons between 1911 and 1928. Two wagons supplied were fitted with a dynamo and full showman's fittings, works numbers 3843 "The Lion" and 3883 "Electra". In 1939 the second of these was totally destroyed in a Nazi bombing raid over Plymouth. The company's steam wagons were never serious competitors to rivals Foden, whose products were much better regarded and had cornered the market prior to Burrell entering somewhat late.

== Other Products ==
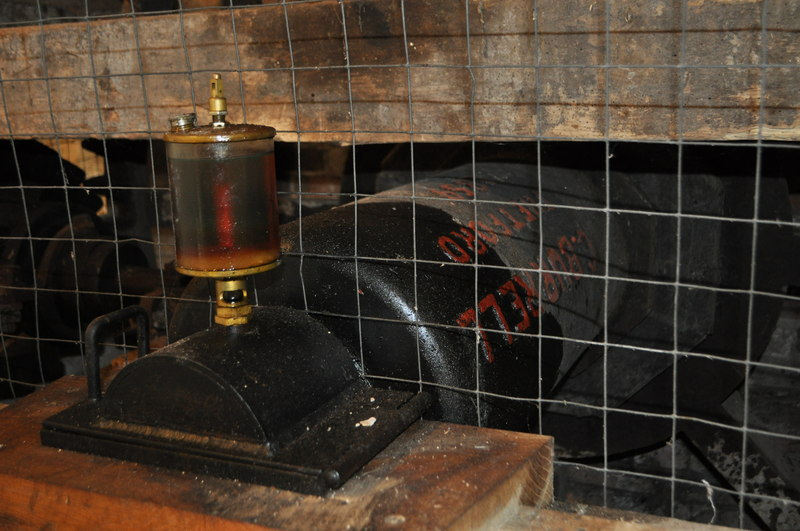
The Axle, stamped with the firm's name

Three miles south of Thetford is Euston Hall, in the grounds is a private watermill. The mill was designed to pump water and also grind corn. Being only a short distance from the factory an axle for the waterwheel was produced. This is the only known surviving waterwheel axle made by the firm.

== St Nicholas Works ==
=== Factory ===
The St Nicholas works was named after the long demolished church of St Nicholas which had stood nearby. The Thetford site where Burrell designed and built their equipment occupied a 3-acre (12,000 m^{2}) area close to the centre of the town, next to the Little Ouse river, with the buildings divided by Minstergate Street. At its closure the works consisted of 15 separate parts each with a distinct purpose.

=== Workforce ===
The labour force of Charles Burrell & Sons Ltd tended to be static and two or three generations of the same family could be employed within the works at the same time. The employees generally enjoyed tolerable surroundings and were not subjected to the unrelenting demands for greater productivity and efficiency as was the case at other highly industrialised companies at that time. In the 1890s the company employed about 300 men, including a number of indentured apprentices. By 1914 this had grown to in excess of 400.

The company produced a number of notable employees who went on to contribute to the development of various spheres of engineering in the twentieth century after leaving Burrell, the most famous of these being Edmund Bruce Ball who later went on to become President of the Institution of Mechanical Engineers in 1939. Another was former Head Salesman Sidney Harrison who worked for the company from 1900 until its closure in 1928, he had an enormous fund of recollections concerning his experiences with the company.

== The Burrell Hiring Company ==
In 1887 in an effort to promote business Burrell set up The Burrell Hiring Company whereby customers could purchase engines on a hire purchase scheme without having to stand the total cost of an engine. The hiring company was founded with Charles Burrell Jnr and Frederick Burrell as directors and the company purchased engines at list prices less 10% from the parent company. An agreement was made with the customer allowing for an initial payment followed by a series of instalments, usually sixteen, paid at quarterly or half yearly intervals with interest usually charged at 6% and on occasions 7.5%, the total terms of repayment usually being 3 or 4 years. Failure to maintain regular payments meant repossession and the equipment was offered for sale. There are a number of documented cases of these repossessions occurring. All engines owned by the Hiring Company carried a brass plate giving a reference number, it was a term of the agreement that this plate could not be removed until the final payment had been made and ownership transferred. The scheme was available for both new and second hand Burrell engines and equipment and a considerable proportion of Burrell's output was purchased on these terms. The scheme was extended upon Burrell entering of the AGE group and several other members of the group offered items for sale through the Hiring Company.

== See also ==
- Charles Burrell Museum in Thetford
