= Hulver Street =

Coordinates: 52.2530°N 1.3747°E

- Hamlet
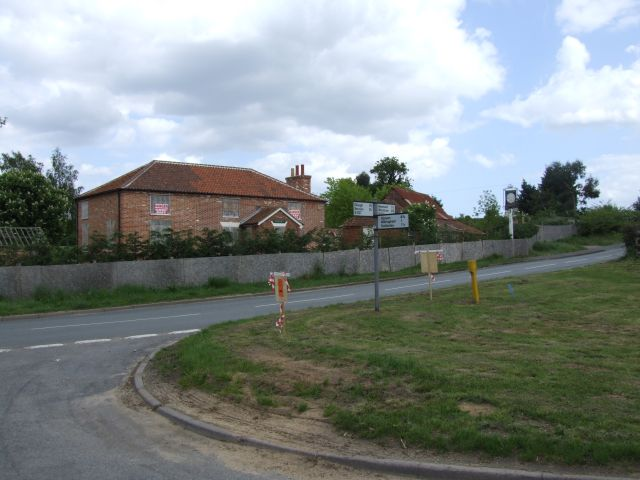

- Location within Suffolk
- OS grid reference: TM 46870 86983
- Civil parish: Henstead with Hulver Street
- District: East Suffolk
- Shire county: Suffolk
- Region: East
- Country: England
- Sovereign state: United Kingdom
- Post town: Beccles
- Postcode district: NR34
- Dialling code: 01502
- UK Parliament: Waveney

Hulver Street, also known simply as Hulver, is a hamlet near the market town of Beccles, in the civil parish of Henstead with Hulver Street, in the East Suffolk district, in the county of Suffolk, England. Until 2019 it was in Waveney district. It borders the River Hundred to the north and north-west, Mutford to the north, Henstead to the east, Sotterley to the south, and Ellough to the north-east.

The majority of its housing is situated along the B1127 road that connects to the A146 in North Cove and the A12 in Wrentham.

Hulver lacks most major public amenities. However, it does have a village hall. The hall hosts birthday parties and celebrations alongside activities such as short mat bowls and yoga classes.

== History ==
Hulver was named after the numerous holly trees which once lined the road.

In 1870–72, John Marius Wilson's Imperial Gazetteer of England and Wales described Hulver like this:

HULVER, or HULVER-STREET, a hamlet in Henstead parish, Suffolk; 4 miles SE of Beccles. It has a postoffice, of the name of Hulver, under Beccles, and a Wesleyan chapel. Acres, 490. Real property, £913. Pop., 293

The village used to have a pub - The Gate. However, this was closed at a date between 1997 and 2007 and has since been converted into a house.
