= St Mary the Virgin's Church, Blundeston =

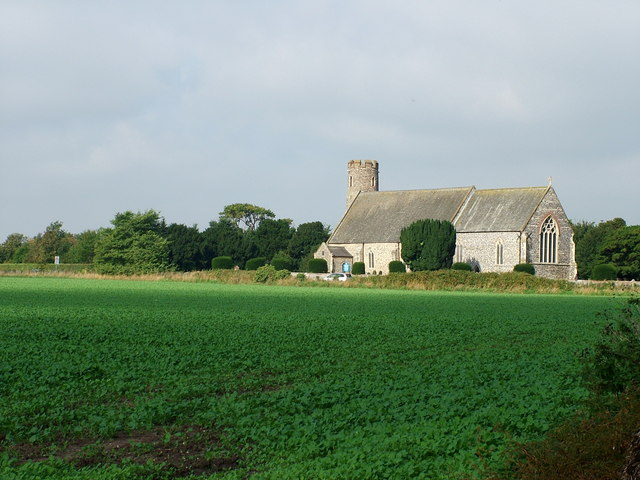
- St Mary the Virgin's Church, Blundeston
- OS grid reference: TM5134597234
- Location: Church Road, Blundeston, Suffolk NR32 5AX
- Country: England
- Denomination: Anglican
- Churchmanship: Central Anglican

History
- Status: Parish church

Architecture
- Functional status: Active
- Heritage designation: Grade I
- Designated: 27 November 1954
- Architectural type: Church

Administration
- Province: Canterbury
- Diocese: Diocese of Norwich
- Archdeaconry: Norfolk
- Deanery: Lothingland
- Parish: Blundeston with Flixton

St Mary the Virgin Church is located in the village of Blundeston near Lowestoft. It is an active Anglican parish church in the deanery of Lothingland, part of the archdeaconry of Norfolk, and the Diocese of Norwich.

St Mary the Virgin's Church was listed at Grade I on 27 November 1954.

== History ==
The original building dates from the Anglo-Saxon era. The church tower has sections dating from the 11th century including the remnants of the former belfry. Other sections on the tower date from between the 15th to 16th century, including the top third of the tower which was cast in redbrick. The church nave originally built in the 12th century and rebuilt in the 14th contains windows made between the 13th and 15th century The chancel of the church contains brass inscriptions from the 17th century and located over the south door the arms of Charles II dated 1673.

== See also ==
- Grade I listed buildings in Suffolk
