= Corton Windmill =

Tower mill in Suffolk, England

Corton Mill
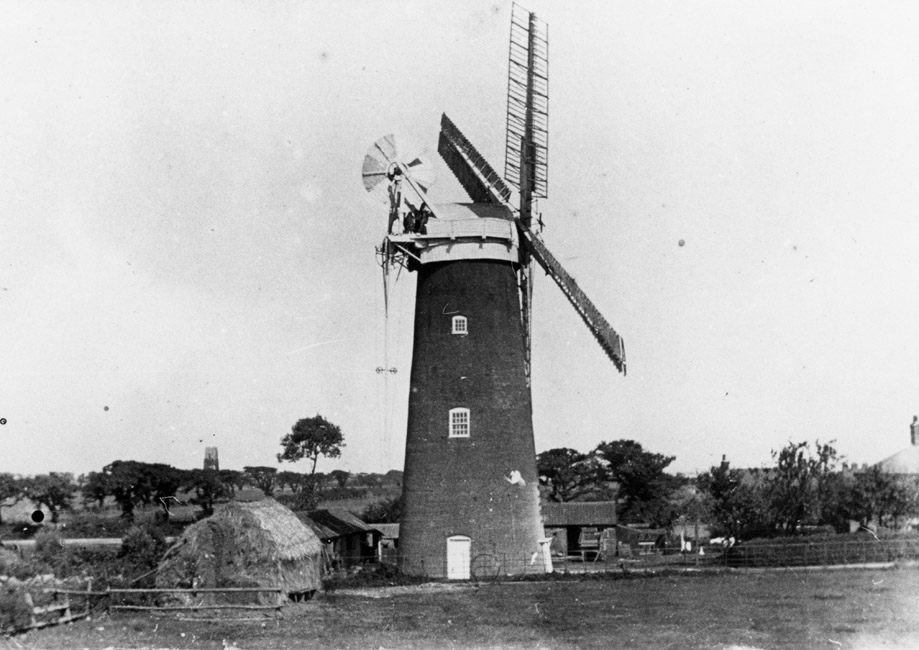
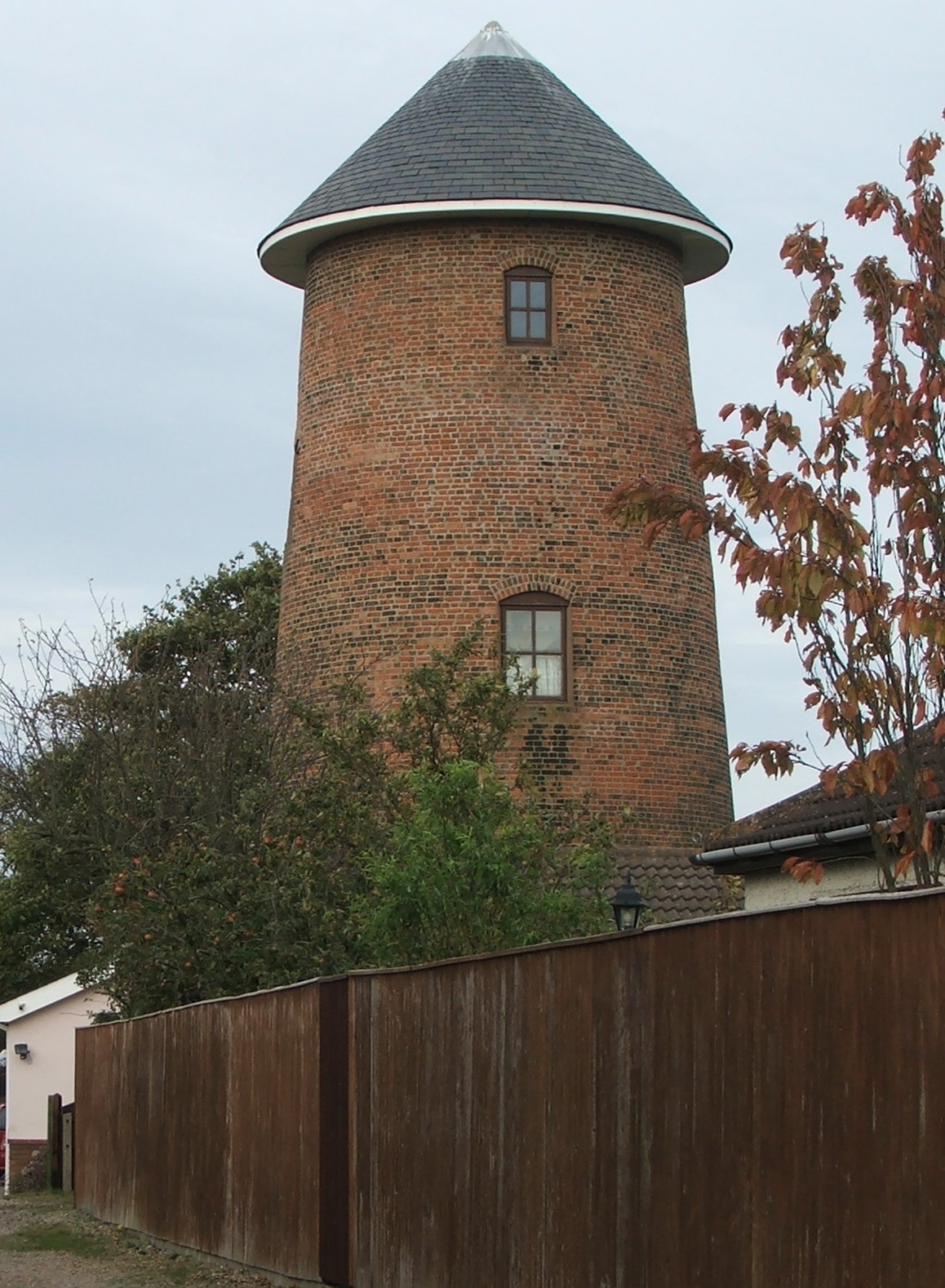
- The mill in 1910 (above) and the converted mill (below)

Origin
- Mill name: Corton Mill
- Mill location: TM 542 974
- Coordinates: 52°30′55″N 1°44′44″E
- Operator(s): Private
- Year built: 1837

Information
- Purpose: Corn mill
- Type: Tower mill
- Storeys: six storeys
- No. of sails: Four Sails
- Type of sails: Patent sails
- Winding: Fantail
- Fantail blades: Six blades
- No. of pairs of millstones: Two pairs
- Year lost: Early 20th century

Corton Mill is a Grade II listed tower mill at Corton, Suffolk, England, which has been converted to residential accommodation.

== History ==
Corton Mill was erected in 1837. It ceased work before the First World War and was later truncated by one storey. The mill was used for many years as a store.

== Description ==
Corton Mill was a six-storey tower mill. It had a boat shaped cap winded by a bladed fantail. The four Patent sails drove two pairs of millstones. The mill was built with room to add a further two pairs of millstones. Photographs show the fantail to have been six bladed and that the sails had ten bays of three shutters.
