= Henstead =

Village in Suffolk, England

Coordinates: 52.415°N 1.667°E

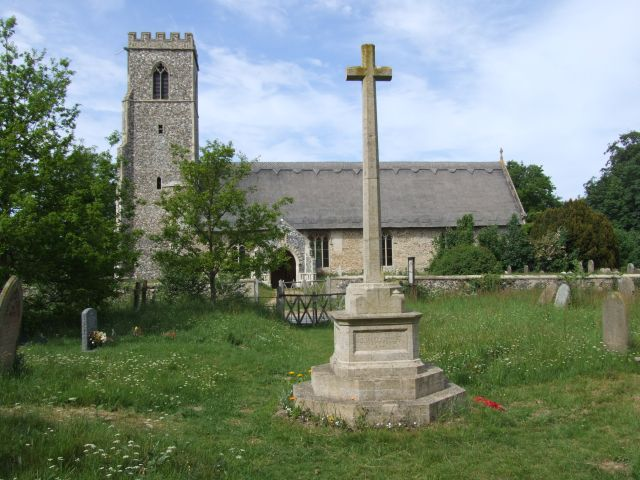
- Henstead, Church of St Mary

- Location within Suffolk
- Population: 408 (2011 census, parish)
- OS grid reference: TM495860
- Civil parish: Henstead with Hulver Street
- District: East Suffolk
- Shire county: Suffolk
- Region: East
- Country: England
- Sovereign state: United Kingdom
- Post town: Beccles
- Postcode district: NR34
- Dialling code: 01502
- UK Parliament: Waveney

Henstead is a village in the civil parish of Henstead with Hulver Street, in the East Suffolk district, in the county of Suffolk, England. It has a church called Church of St Mary which is a Grade I listed building. It has very few housing areas, and is a rural area. It is situated near Rushmere and Kessingland and the A12.

The parish has a population of 408, which contains many very similar sized civil parishes.

The Private preparatory school, The Old School Henstead, is also located in the village.

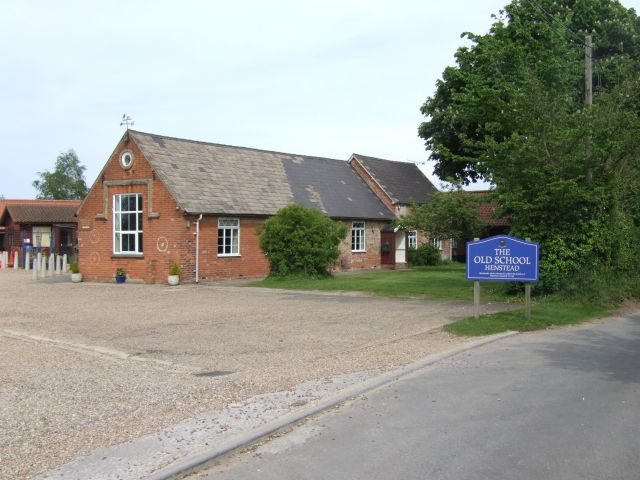
The Old School, Henstead.

.

The church has a Norman doorway, and an embattled tower. The village stands three miles from the coast, and five miles south-east of Beccles railway station.

== History ==
The name "Henstead" means 'Hen place'. In 1771 the landscape artist, Thomas Hearne spent six weeks with the young George Beaumont in Henstead at the home of the latter's tutor at Eton, Charles Davy (a priest). For Beaumont it proved the inspiration for his future profession as a landscape painter himself. Through time, Henstead has had a history of having job opportunities mainly in agriculture, retail and handicraft.

In 1831, out of a total of 144 people, 107 worked in agriculture, 20 worked in retail and handicraft, and 17 worked in other domains.

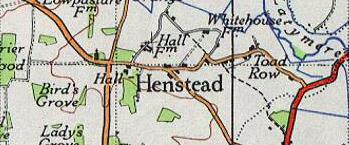
Map of Henstead from the 20th century

The structure of jobs in Henstead has not changed, it is still a rural area, with most jobs available in the agricultural domain. For example, in 1881, around 130 jobs were in the agricultural domain, the highest of all sectors.
This is a description from the 1870s:

The parish contains also the hamlet of Hulver, which has a post office under Beccles. Acres, 1, 918. Real property, £2, 090. Pop., 534. Houses, 120.

Henstead has had a history of poor social structure:

In 1831, 134 people lived in Henstead and 106 of those were labourers or servants. There were very few occupations that offered high wages, most were in primary industry.

A map of Henstead from the 20th century is shown to the left.
