= Henstead with Hulver Street =

Civil parish in Suffolk, England

Coordinates: 52.416°N 1.657°E

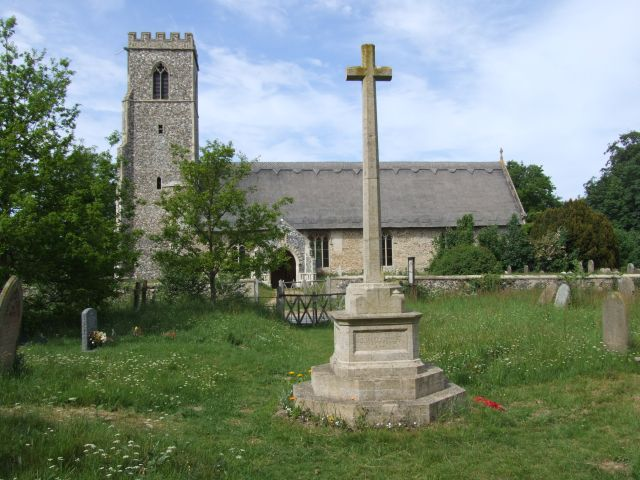
- Henstead church

- Location within Suffolk
- Area: 8 km^{2} (3.1 sq mi)
- Population: 408
  - Density: 51/km^{2} (130/sq mi)
- OS grid reference: TM488861
- District: East Suffolk
- Shire county: Suffolk
- Region: East
- Country: England
- Sovereign state: United Kingdom
- Post town: Beccles
- Postcode district: NR34
- Dialling code: 01502
- Police: Suffolk
- Fire: Suffolk
- Ambulance: East of England
- UK Parliament: Suffolk Coastal

Henstead with Hulver Street is a civil parish in the East Suffolk district of the English county of Suffolk. It is around 5 miles (8.0 km) south-west of Lowestoft, 5 miles (8.0 km) south-east of Beccles and 6 miles (9.7 km) north of the coastal town of Southwold. The parish has an area of 8 square kilometres (3.1 mi^{2}) and consists of the villages of Henstead, where the parish church is located, and Hulver Street. It borders the parishes of Benacre, Ellough, Gisleham, Kessingland, Mutford, Rushmere, Sotterley and Wrentham.

At the 2011 United Kingdom census the parish had a population of 408, having increased from a mid 2005 estimate of 320. (Note: 2011 United Kingdom census population data from the Office for National Statistics used a 'best-fit' method and, as a result, does not necessarily map exactly to parish boundaries.) A 2016 estimate suggested that the population had risen slightly to 416.

The main A12 road cuts across the eastern border of the parish, with the B1127 Beccles to Benacre road running through Hulver Street and past Henstead church. The Hundred River defines much of the northern border of the parish, with the western boundary bordered by the Sotterley estate.
