= Lynn Grove Academy =

Location
- Lynn Grove, Gorleston-on-Sea; Great Yarmouth, Norfolk, NR31 8AP; England; 52°35′01″N 1°42′33″E

Information
- Type: Academy
- Motto: Small enough to care, big enough to be exciting
- Established: 1965
- Trust: Creative Education Trust
- Department for Education URN: 137541 Tables
- Ofsted: Reports
- Principal: Amy Brookes
- Staff: 110
- Gender: Coeducational
- Age: 11 to 16
- Enrolment: Approx. 1,400 pupils
- Website: http://www.lynngroveacademy.org.uk

Lynn Grove Academy (formerly Lynn Grove High School) is a secondary school with academy status, located between the Gorleston-on-Sea and Bradwell areas of Great Yarmouth in the English county of Norfolk. The school educates about 1,400 children between the ages of 11 and 16. The school was originally constructed as one main building which has been extended and other blocks and facilities such as a new library and astroturf area have been added. Following an Ofsted inspection in May 2015 the school was rated 'Requires Improvement'. Following a further inspection in May 2017 the school was rated 'Good'.

== School history ==
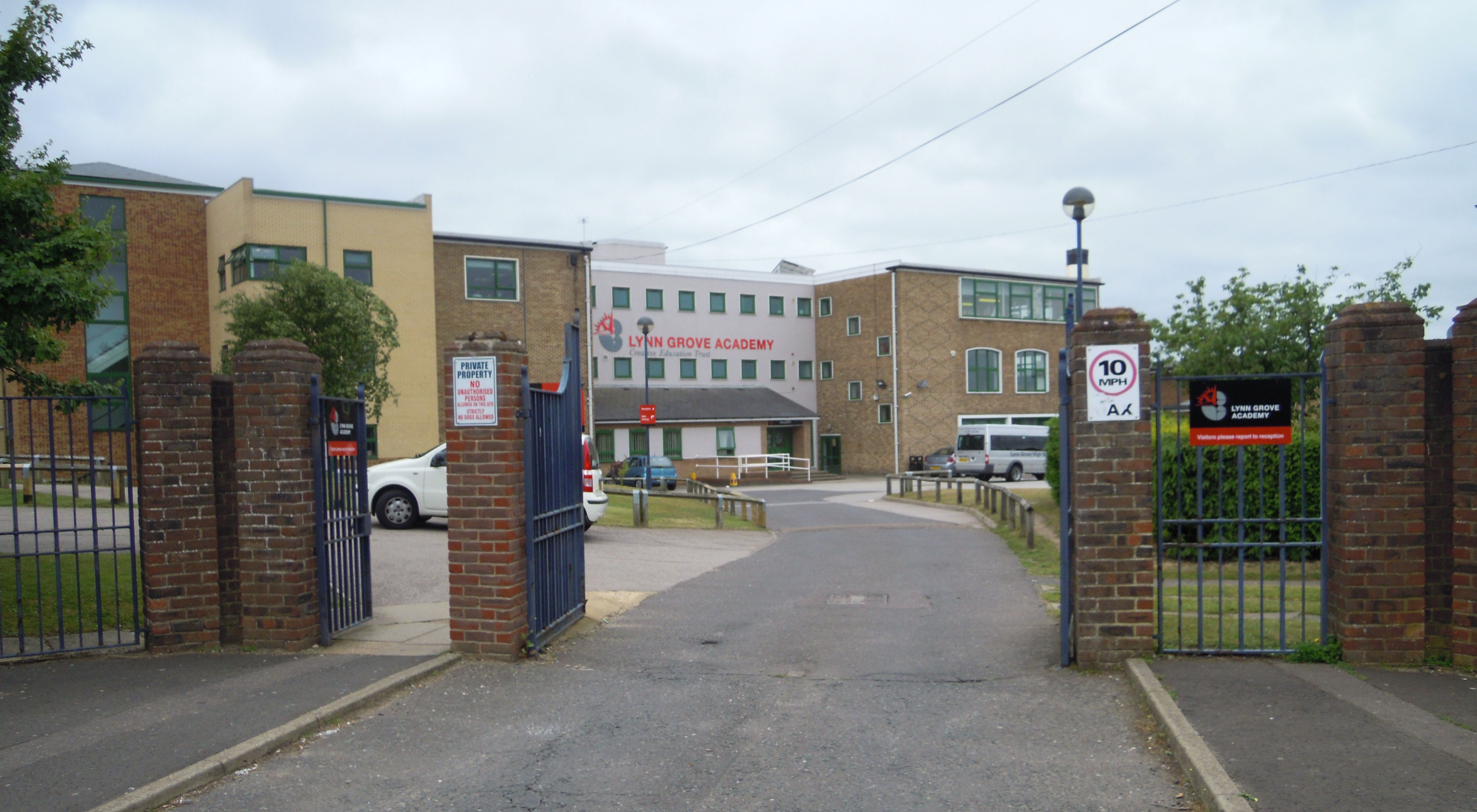
Lynn Grove Academy in 2015

The school building was originally built for the Great Yarmouth High School for Girls which moved from Trafalgar Road in Great Yarmouth to the new building in 1957. It became the coeducational Gorleston-on-Sea Grammar School in 1970. In 2015, the school became Lynn Grove Academy.

The school joined the Creative Education Trust in 2015.

== Ofsted reports ==
The school was inspected by Ofsted in 2010, receiving an overall Grade 1 (outstanding). After becoming an academy the school was inspected in December 2013 when it was judged inadequate (Grade 4). Following a further inspection by Ofsted in May 2015 the school was rated 'Requires Improvement' (Grade 3); it gained this rating in three out of four categories, the other (Pupil Behaviour) being rated 'Good'. Following a further inspection in May 2017 the school was rated 'Good'.

== Notable pupils ==
- Hannah Spearritt of S Club 7 attended the school
- Bimini Bon-Boulash of Rupaul's Drag Race UK attended the school
