= Corton Cliffs =

Site of Special Scientific Interest in England

Coordinates: 52.509°N 1.75°E

- Site of Special Scientific Interest
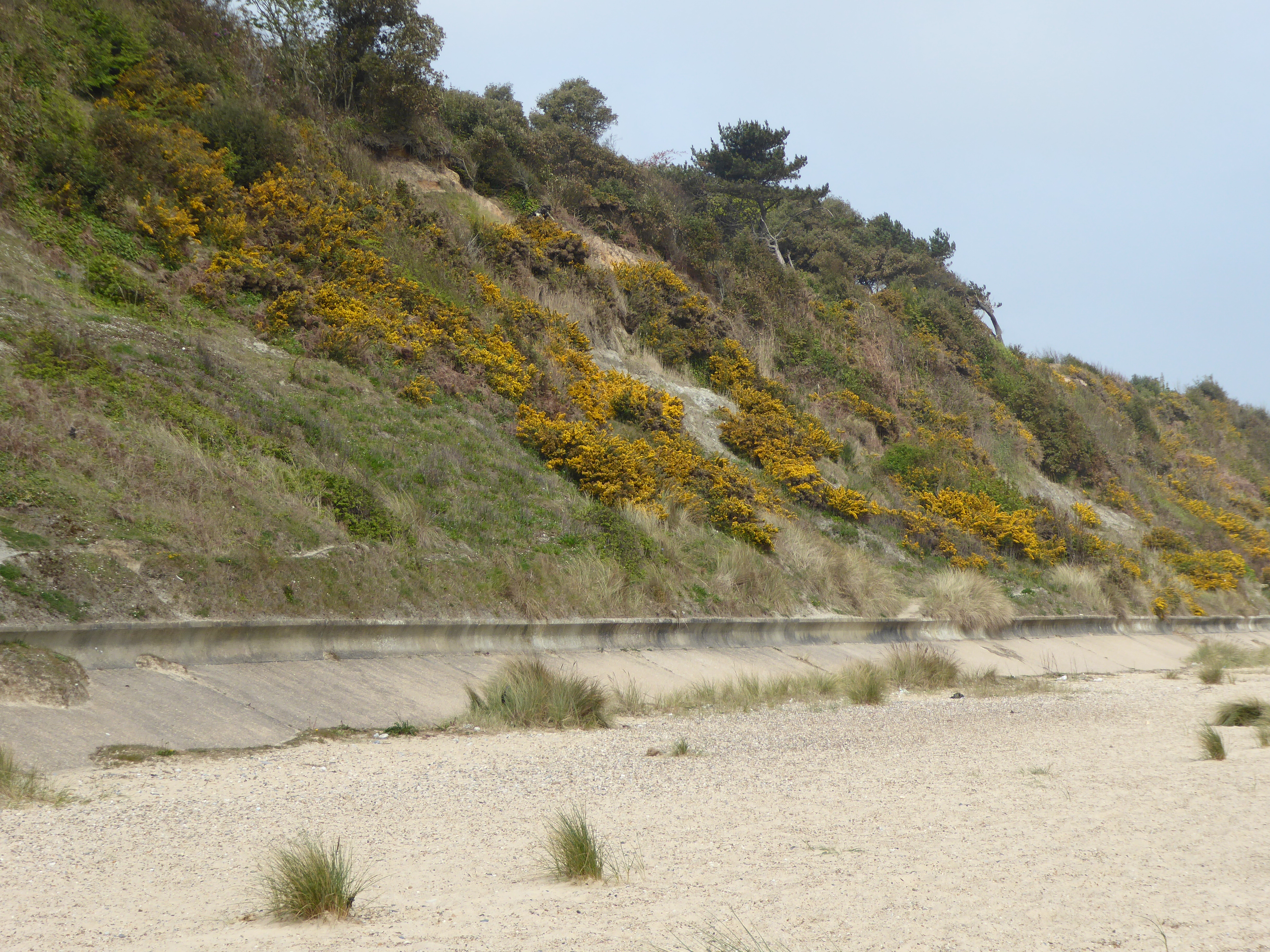
- Location of Corton Cliffs.
- Area of search: Suffolk
- Grid reference: TM 546 967
- Interest: Geological
- Area: 5.5 hectares
- Notification date: 1987
- Location map: Magic Map

Corton Cliffs is a 5.5-hectare (14-acre) geological Site of Special Scientific Interest north of Lowestoft in Suffolk. It is a Geological Conservation Review site.

This is described by Natural England as a "nationally important" site, as it is the type locality for the Anglian glaciation around 450,000 years ago. The Anglian was the most extreme ice age of the Pleistocene epoch. The site displays the complete Anglian sequence and its relation to the preceding Cromerian stage.

Below the site is a public beach. Corton Beach was designated a naturist beach in the 1970s.
