= Bradwell, Norfolk =

Village in Norfolk, England

Coordinates: 52.574°N 1.694°E

Bradwell
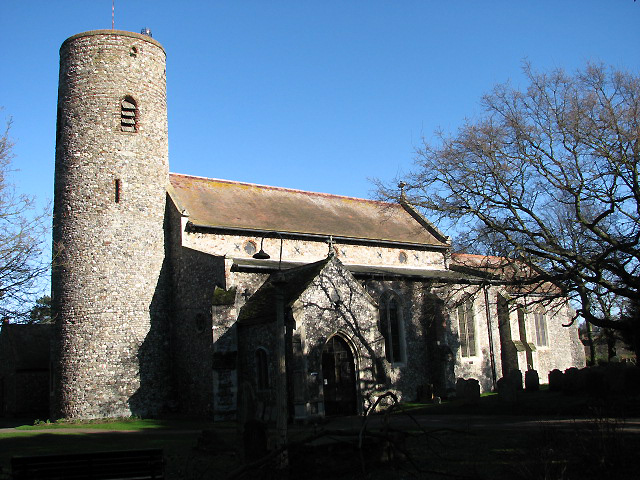
- Church of St. Nicholas, Bradwell

- Location within Norfolk
- Area: 9.74 km^{2} (3.76 sq mi)
- Population: 11,628 (2021)
  - Density: 1,194/km^{2} (3,090/sq mi)
- OS grid reference: TG504038
- District: Great Yarmouth
- Shire county: Norfolk
- Region: East
- Country: England
- Sovereign state: United Kingdom
- Post town: GREAT YARMOUTH
- Postcode district: NR31
- Dialling code: 01493
- Police: Norfolk
- Fire: Norfolk
- Ambulance: East of England
- UK Parliament: Great Yarmouth

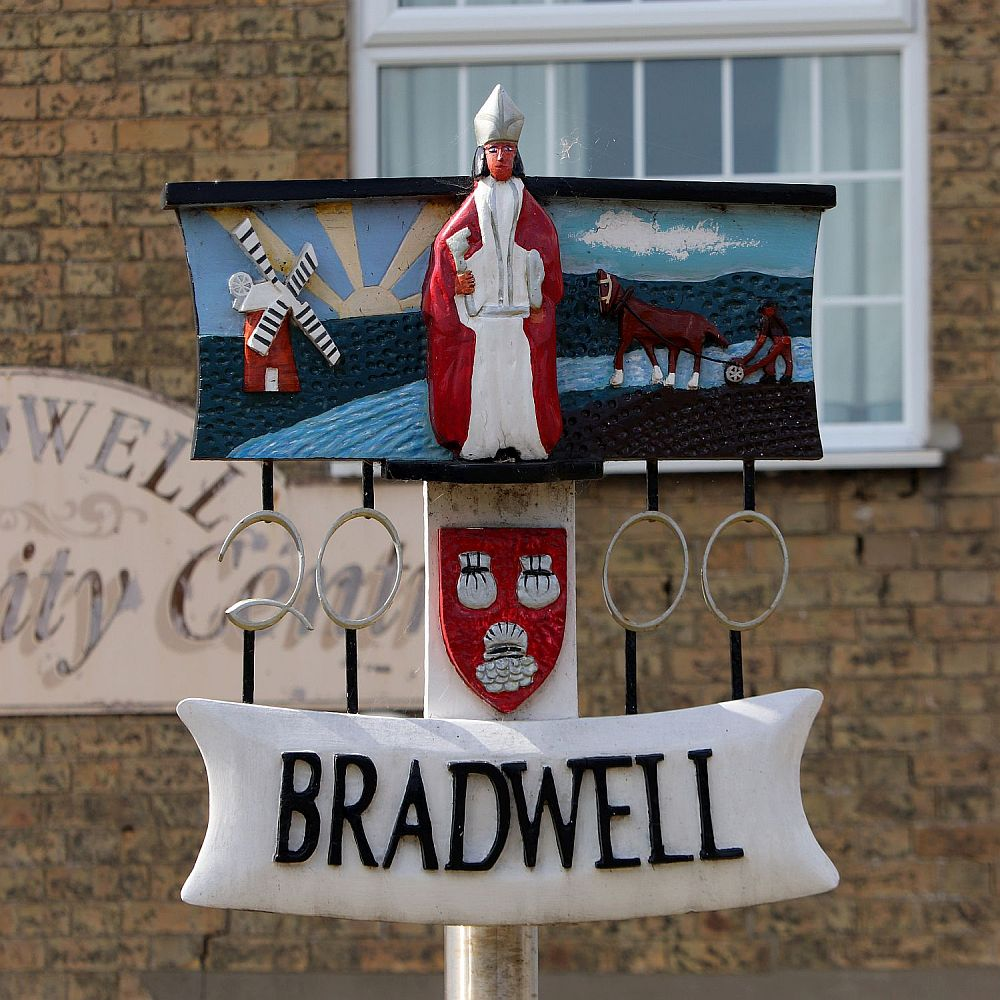
Bradwell Village Sign

Bradwell is a village and civil parish in the English county of Norfolk. The village is immediately west of, and largely indistinguishable from, the built-up urban area of the towns of Great Yarmouth and Gorleston-on-Sea.

== History ==
Bradwell's name is of Anglo-Saxon origin, although the village is not recorded in the Domesday Book.

During the Second World War, Bradwell was hit by several air raids designed to attack Great Yarmouth. There were searchlight batteries and pillboxes built in the village during the war.

== Geography ==
The civil parish has an area of 9.74 square kilometres (3.76 sq mi) and according to the 2021 census, Bradwell has a population of 11,628 people which shows a large increase from the 10,528 people recorded in the 2011 census.

The A143 road, between Gorleston-on-Sea and Haverhill, bisects Bradwell.

== St. Nicholas' Church ==
Bradwell's parish church is dedicated to Saint Nicholas, is located on Church Walk and is also one of the 185 surviving English Round-tower churches, built before the Norman Conquest. The font dates from the 15th-century and shows clear signs of an iconoclastic attack in the 17th-century.

== Education ==
Schools within the parish include Hillside Primary School, Homefield Church of England Primary and Nursery School, Lynn Grove Academy, Wroughton Academies, and Woodlands Primary and Nursery School.

== Governance ==
For the purposes of local government, the parish today falls within the district of Great Yarmouth. However prior to the Local Government Act 1972, the parish was within Lothingland Rural District in Suffolk. It is part of the Great Yarmouth parliamentary constituency.

Bradwell Parish Council has responsibility for a number of amenities within the village. It is based at the Leo Coles Pavilion, located at the Green Lane playing field. The council publishes a twice-yearly newspaper, The Bradwellian.

== Notable people ==
- Mervyn King, professional darts player.
- Sophie McKinna, British Olympic shot putter.
