= Belton with Browston =

Civil parish in Norfolk, England

Coordinates: 52.567°N 1.660°E

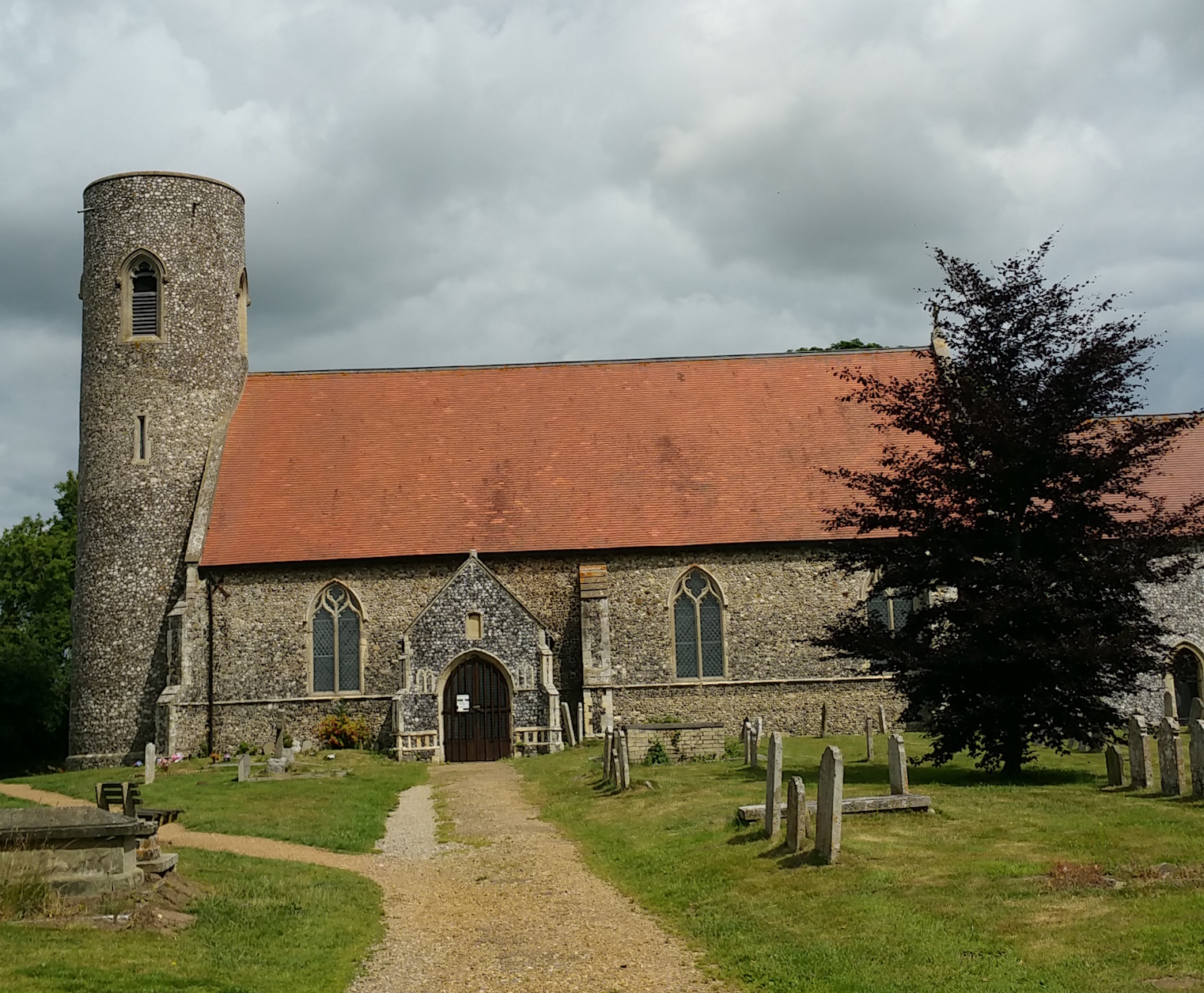
- Belton's medieval church

- Location within Norfolk
- Area: 8.36 km^{2} (3.23 sq mi)
- Population: 3,805 (2011)
  - Density: 455/km^{2} (1,180/sq mi)
- OS grid reference: TG 481 029
- Civil parish: Belton with Browston
- District: Great Yarmouth
- Shire county: Norfolk
- Region: East
- Country: England
- Sovereign state: United Kingdom
- Post town: GREAT YARMOUTH
- Postcode district: NR31
- Dialling code: 01493
- Police: Norfolk
- Fire: Norfolk
- Ambulance: East of England

Belton with Browston is a civil parish in the Borough of Great Yarmouth in Norfolk, England. Historically part of Suffolk, the parish consists of the villages of Belton and Browston Green, and is situated 5 miles (8.0 km) south-west of Great Yarmouth and 6 miles (9.7 km) north-west of Lowestoft.

The civil parish has an area of 8.36 square kilometres (3.23 sq mi) and at the 2001 census had a population of 4,098 in 1,589 households, the population reducing to 3,805 at the 2011 Census. For the purposes of local government, the parish today falls within the borough of Great Yarmouth in Norfolk. Prior to the Local Government Act 1972, the parish was within Lothingland Rural District in Suffolk.

== History ==
The earliest evidence of human inhabitation is a flint axehead from the Palaeolithic period. Burgh Castle Roman Site was inhabited throughout the Roman Britain period.

Belton (as Beletun) and Browston (as Brockestuna) are both mentioned in Domesday Book. The population was probably around 50–60 in each of the villages.

During the medieval period, Belton and Browston were agricultural communities, and evidence has indicated that Browston could have been the larger of the two during this time. There is no mention of a church in Belton at the time of Domesday book. The earliest record of the church is in the time of Henry I who ruled from 1100 to 1135. Judging by architectural style, the current church building dates from the 1300s with major restoration work taking place from 1837 Rev Revd Francis Howes and his family. The tower was rebuilt in 1849. Belton continued as a small farming community and in 1858, Belton Station was opened, giving the village a railway link to Great Yarmouth. This helped the local farming industry as Belton became a market gardening centre.

Belton Common was used by the Suffolk Regiment for military and training purposes during World War I. During World War II the Royal Norfolk Regiment were billeted in the parish. An American B-24 Liberator bomber,Belle of the East crash-landed in the parish. The crew survived the crash and were aided by the villagers; a plaque on the Tavern pub commemorates the incident with a nearby street bearing the name "Belle of the East Way".

After 1950 the population of the village increased greatly, especially during the rapid expansion of the 1970s. On 26 September 1990 the parish was renamed from "Belton" to "Belton with Browston".

== Notable people ==
- John Mills, actor. Spent his early years in Belton as his father was the headmaster of the village school. He recalled on Desert Island Discs many years later that his first public performance was in a concert in the village institute organised by his father.
- Jessica-Jane Applegate, paralympic swimmer. A gold postbox close to the Tavern pub in the village recognises her Paralympic Gold in 2012.
