= Lothingland =

Area in the English counties of Suffolk and Norfolk on the North Sea coast

Coordinates: 52.52°N 1.70°E

Lothingland is an area in the English counties of Suffolk and Norfolk on the North Sea coast. It is bound by the River Yare and Breydon Water to the north, the River Waveney to the west and Oulton Broad to the south, and includes the parts of Lowestoft north of Lake Lothing.

In antiquity the River Waveney flowed to the sea through Oulton Broad and Lake Lothing, reaching the sea at Lowestoft, meaning that together with the mouth of the River Yare Lothingland was historically an island, and was indeed known as the Island of Lothingland. When the Waveney deviated its course on its current sharp turn to the north this was no longer the case. In 1833 the Norwich and Lowestoft Navigation opened for sea-borne vessels to pass through Oulton Broad and Lake Lothing, the area once again effectively became an island.

Historically it formed a half-hundred, which was incorporated into Mutford to form Mutford and Lothingland. A Lothingland Rural District (excluding Lowestoft) in the former county of East Suffolk existed until 1974. The area was all within the historic county of Suffolk until boundaries were redrawn in 1974 and some of the area was transferred to Norfolk. Local government in Lothingland is now split between the borough of Great Yarmouth in Norfolk and East Suffolk District in Suffolk. There is a ward within East Suffolk named Lothingland; the population of the ward taken at the 2011 census was 5,479.

Lothingland is also the name of a deanery in the Diocese of Norwich.
