= Oulton, Suffolk =

Civil parish in Suffolk, England

Coordinates: 52.489°N 1.709°E

Oulton
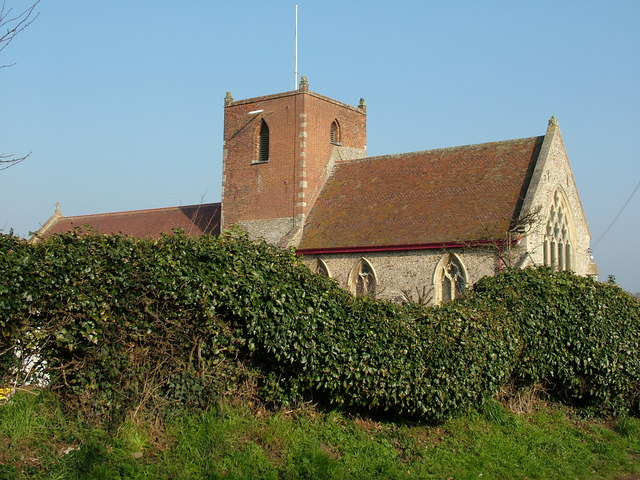
- Church of St Michael

- Location within Suffolk
- Area: 5 km^{2} (1.9 sq mi)
- Population: 4,020 (2011 est.)
  - Density: 804/km^{2} (2,080/sq mi)
- OS grid reference: TM519943
- District: East Suffolk
- Shire county: Suffolk
- Region: East
- Country: England
- Sovereign state: United Kingdom
- Post town: Lowestoft
- Postcode district: NR32
- Dialling code: 01502
- Police: Suffolk
- Fire: Suffolk
- Ambulance: East of England
- UK Parliament: Waveney

Oulton is a civil parish on the western edge of the town of Lowestoft in the north of the English county of Suffolk. It is in the East Suffolk district. The eastern part of the parish forms part of the suburbs of Lowestoft, whilst the western section extends into The Broads national park, reaching the River Waveney and Oulton Dyke.

At the 2011 United Kingdom census the parish had an estimated population of 4,020. (Note: The population of the neighbouring parish of Flixton was combined with Oulton at the 2011 census. The census does not report population figures for parishes where the population is small enough to potential identify individuals. The population of Flixton in 2005 was estimated to be around 40.) It borders the Suffolk parishes of Blundeston, Carlton Colville, Corton, Flixton, Lowestoft and Oulton Broad and the Norfolk parish of Burgh St Peter across the River Waveney.

The B1074 Lowestoft to Somerleyton road passes through the parish, as do the A117 and B1375 roads running north to the A47 road. The Lowestoft to Norwich railway line passes through the western part of the parish, running through areas of marshland near to the River Waveney. The nearest railway station is Oulton Broad North.

== History ==
The Anglo Saxon village of Dunestuna or Dunston, which is mentioned in the Domesday Book, is thought to have been within the current area of Oulton. Oulton first appeared as Olton and Oldton on maps from the late 16th-century. A manor called Houghton or Houton existed in the area in the later medieval period and the name of the current parish may well have developed from this.

In September 2020, archaeologists announced the discovery in the parish of an Anglo-Saxon cemetery with 17 cremations and 191 burials dating back to the 7th century, comparable to the date of Sutton Hoo to the south. The graves contained the remains of men, women and children, as well as artefacts including small iron knives and silver pennies, wrist clasps, strings of amber and glass beads. According to Andrew Peachey, who carried out the excavations, the skeletons had mostly vanished because of the highly acidic soil. They were preserved as brittle shapes and "sand silhouettes" in the sand.

The neighbouring area of Oulton Broad was once part of the parish, but became its own parish in 1904.

== Landmarks ==
There are six listed buildings in Oulton, including a late 16th-century manor house. The parish church is dedicated to St Michael. It dates from the 12th-century, although there may have been a church on the site at the time of the Domesday Book. It was built with a cruciform pattern and a low tower and retains a Norman doorway and 15th-century octagonal font. The church is the only Grade I listed building in the parish. Two commemorative brass plates, one of which was dedicated to the memory of John Fastolf and his wide Katherine, were stolen when the church was refurbished in 1857.
