= Blundeston =

Village in Suffolk, England

Coordinates: 52.516°N 1.707°E

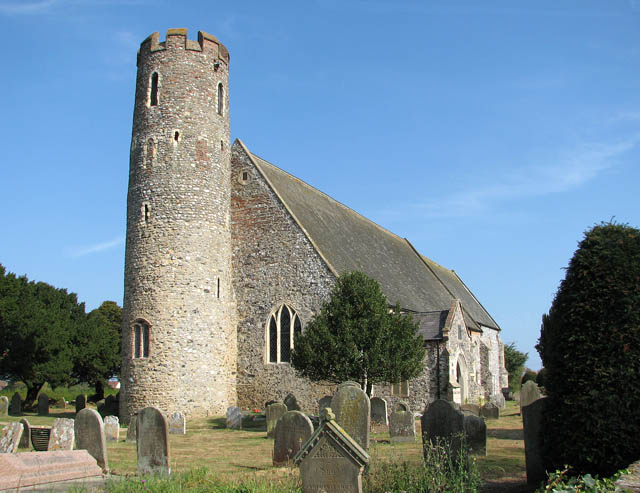
- Church of St Mary

- Location within Suffolk
- Area: 6 km^{2} (2.3 sq mi)
- Population: 1,637 (2011)
  - Density: 273/km^{2} (710/sq mi)
- OS grid reference: TM516974
- District: East Suffolk
- Shire county: Suffolk
- Region: East
- Country: England
- Sovereign state: United Kingdom
- Post town: Lowestoft
- Postcode district: NR32
- Dialling code: 01502
- UK Parliament: Waveney

Blundeston is a village and civil parish in the north of the English county of Suffolk. It is 3.5 miles (5.6 km) north-west of Lowestoft, 6 miles (9.7 km) south of Great Yarmouth and around 1.75 miles (2.82 km) inland from the North Sea coast. It is part of the area known as Lothingland in the East Suffolk district. Blundeston Prison was located on the southern edge of the village but closed in early 2014.

The parish had a population of 1,637 at the 2011 United Kingdom census. It extends from the River Waveney, which marks the county border with Norfolk, in the west to the A47 road in the east. It borders the Suffolk parishes of Corton, Flixton, Oulton, Lound and Somerleyton, Ashby and Herringfleet as well as the Norfolk parish of Burgh St Peter across the Waveney. The parish council is operated jointly with the sparsely populated parish of Flixton to the south.

The village is clustered in the centre of the parish. The Lowestoft to Norwich railway line crosses the western section of the parish, with the nearest station at Somerleyton railway station. This part of the parish consists of a series of drainage marshes in the floodplain of the Waveney. The B1075 Lowestoft to Somerleyton road crosses the parish.

== History ==
At the Domesday Survey of 1086, Blundeston was named as Dunstuna. It was a small village in the hundred of Lothingland consisting of a handful of families. The land was part of the holdings of Robert of Vaux and Count Alan of Brittany.

During the medieval period the land was split between two manors, one at Blundeston Hall and one owned by the Gonville family. A medieval moated site at Blundeston Hall is a scheduled monument. In the 17th century the hall was owned by William Heveningham who was one of the judges at the trial of Charles I. He was later found guilty of treason and imprisoned at Windsor Castle for the rest of his life.

The ecclesiastical parish was combined with neighbouring Flixton in the 18th century. During the 19th century the hall was owned for a time by Samuel Morton Peto, a railway developer who also owned the nearby Somerleyton Hall. Peto sold the hall following his bankruptcy at the end of the 1860s and by the 1880s it was owned by Richard Henry Reeve, a prominent local landowner.

== Culture and community ==
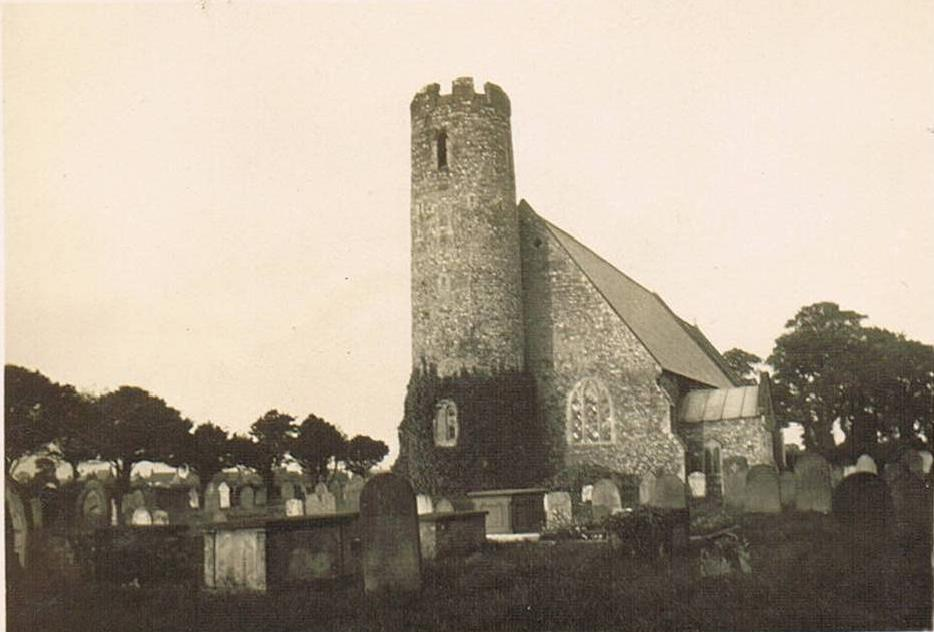
Blundeston Church in 1929

St Mary the Virgin's Church, Blundeston is medieval in origin and is one of around 40 round-tower churches in Suffolk. (Note: The exact number of round-tower churches in the county is a matter of debate. Some sources list 38, others cite between 40 and 43. They almost all date from the late Anglo-Saxon or early Norman periods and were mostly built between the 11th and 14th centuries. There are around 183 round-tower churches in England, most of them in Norfolk, which has around 124, and Suffolk. Four of the churches now in Norfolk were previously in Suffolk before boundary changes in 1974.) The tower includes stonework dating from the 11th century or earlier, whilst the nave is 12th century and includes a number of 14th- and 15th-century features. The octagonal font is 12th-century and the rood screen dates from the 15th century; the building is a Grade I listed building. The font and alter from the ruined St Andrew's church in Flixton were moved to Blundeston after it was destroyed in the Great Storm of 1703.

The village has a number of basic services, including Blundeston Primary School, a village hall, bowls club and a public house, the Plough Inn, which dates from 1701 and is a Grade II listed building. Another pub, the Red Lion, closed in 2010, and the village is known to have had at least two other pubs during the 19th century. At the junction of Church Road and Pound Lane is a circular village pound which was used for storing stray animals. At the end of Church Road at the junction between Short Road and The Street is the disused Blundeston Windmill. The village is the home of Blundeston Cricket Club, who play in the Norfolk Cricket League.

== Blundeston Prison ==
Blundeston prison was built in the early 1960s as a Category C men's prison. It housed around 500 inmates, including at one time Reggie Kray. The prison was closed in early 2014 and the 10 ha (25 acres) site sold to a property developer.

== Notable residents ==
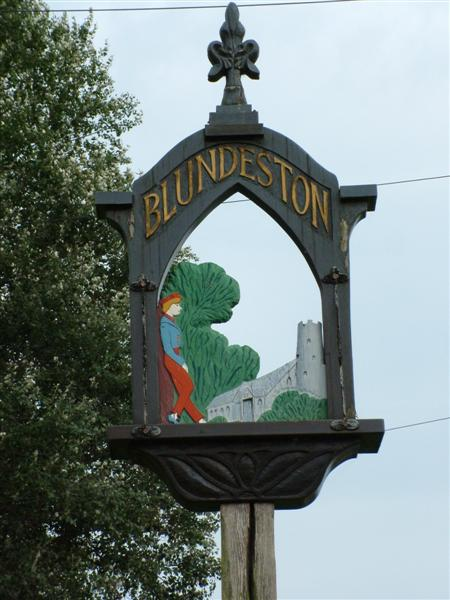
Blundeston village sign, featuring David Copperfield.

Author and illustrator James Mayhew was brought up in Blundeston.

The character David Copperfield in the Charles Dickens novel of the same name was born at "Blunderstone" and a number of local landmarks are referenced in the novel. It is not known whether Dickens ever visited Blundeston, but from letters he wrote he mentions choosing the name after seeing it on a signpost during a visit to Great Yarmouth. Road names such as Copperfield Terrace and Dickens Court reference the novel and on the village sign David is pictured looking towards the church. The Plough Inn has a plaque over its entrance that says "Barkis (the Carrier) from the novel David Copperfield by Charles Dickens, started from here"
