= Corton, Suffolk =

Village in Suffolk, England

Coordinates: 52.515°N 1.747°E

Corton
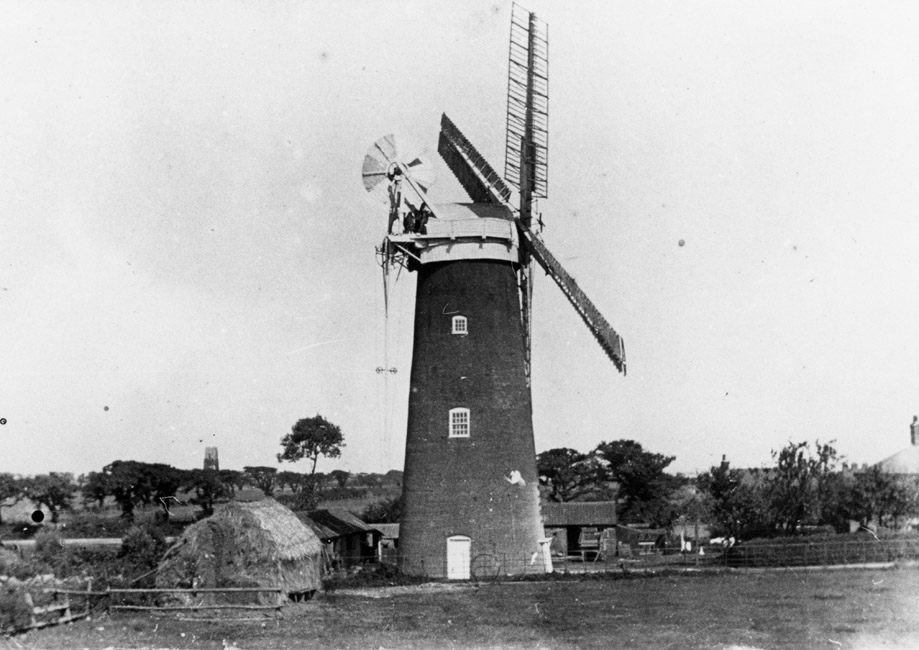
- Corton Windmill in 1910

- Location within Suffolk
- Area: 4 km^{2} (1.5 sq mi)
- Population: 1,099 (2011)
  - Density: 275/km^{2} (710/sq mi)
- OS grid reference: TM544973
- District: East Suffolk
- Shire county: Suffolk
- Region: East
- Country: England
- Sovereign state: United Kingdom
- Post town: Lowestoft
- Postcode district: NR32
- Dialling code: 01502
- UK Parliament: Lowestoft

Corton is a village and civil parish in the north of the English county of Suffolk. It is 3 miles (4.8 km) north of the centre of Lowestoft in the East Suffolk district. The village is on the North Sea coast with the county border with Norfolk to the north.

At the 2011 United Kingdom census the parish had a population of 1,099. It borders the Suffolk parishes of Lound, Blundeston and Flixton as well as the Lowestoft suburb of Gunton and, to the north, the Norfolk parish of Hopton-on-Sea.

The A47 road runs along much of the western border of the parish and cuts through the south-western portion, along with the A1117. The roads meet at a junction near the Pleasurewood Hills theme park, located just south of the parish boundary in Gunton. The former Yarmouth–Lowestoft railway line ran through the village and Corton railway station operated between 1903 and 1970 when the line was closed.

== History ==
Corton is recorded in the Domesday Book of 1086 as Caretuna or Karetuna, a name probably derived from the Viking name Kari. It formed part of the Half Hundred of Lothingland, had a population of around 21 households and formed part of the King's holdings. This included the village of Newton which was lost to coastal erosion during the medieval period. The remaining narrow strip of land was attached to Corton in 1515. This land was transferred from Corton to Hopton, which was also in Suffolk at the time, as part of county reorganisation in 1974, at which point Hopton was renamed Hopton-on-Sea, as it then gained a coastline.

During the 19th-century, the manor of Corton was owned by Samuel Morton Peto, a railway developer who owned the nearby Somerleyton Hall. Corton Windmill, a six-storey tower mill, was built in the 1830s and operated until the early 20th-century. It has since been converted to a private residence and is a Grade II listed building.

In the early 1870s, John Marius Wilson's Imperial Gazetteer of England and Wales described Corton as:

CORTON was 1,495 acres (6.05 km^{2}); of which 140 are water. Real property, £2,614. Pop., 530. Houses, 126. The property is subdivided. The sea has made encroachments. Mammoth bones and other interesting fossils have been found. The church, excepting chancel and tower, was long dilapidated; but has been partially restored.

A lightvessel operated 6 miles (9.7 km) off the coast at Corton from the 1860s until the 20th-century protecting shipping from an area of sandbanks. One of the vessels was sunk by a submarine mine in 1916 during World War I. Corton railway station closed in 1970 and the station building is now used as a private residence.

== Culture and community ==
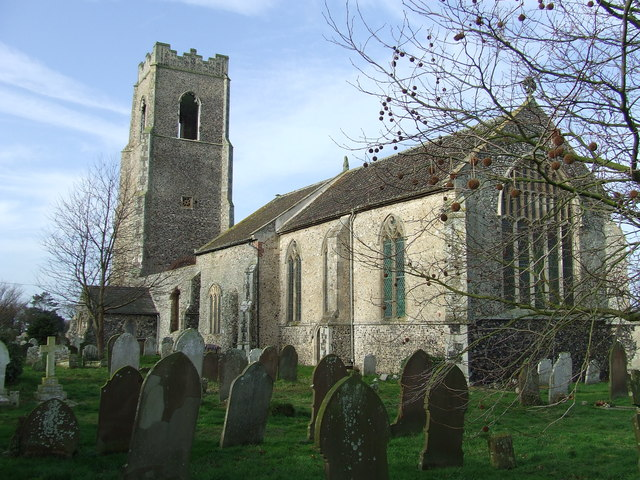
Church of St Bartholomew, Corton, with its nave roof and tower tracery missing

Corton is a seaside holiday centre, with two holiday centres and a long sandy beach. The beach a little to the south of the village, under Corton Cliffs, was designated a naturist beach in 1979, but was de-designated in 2009 alongside revoking a byelaw prohibiting naturists elsewhere; so the previous practice has continued.

The parish church is dedicated to St Bartholomew, and is a partial ruin, with only the chancel roofed. It lies north of the village in an isolated position. The church was built in the medieval period, with some 14th-century stonework remaining, and may have been founded by John de Dersham, the abbot of Leiston Abbey. It was largely derelict by the 17th century and was restored, with the chancel re-roofed, starting in the 1840s. It features a 15th-century tower and a 14th-century carved cross. The building is a Grade II* listed building.

The village has a primary school and a public house, the White Horse. Three more pubs used to operate in the village, the Corton Hut closing in 2018.

== Governance ==
Corton is part of the electoral ward called Gunton and Corton. The population of this ward at the 2011 census was 4,400.
