= Flixton, Lothingland =

Civil parish in Suffolk, England

Coordinates: 52.501°N 1.703°E

Flixton
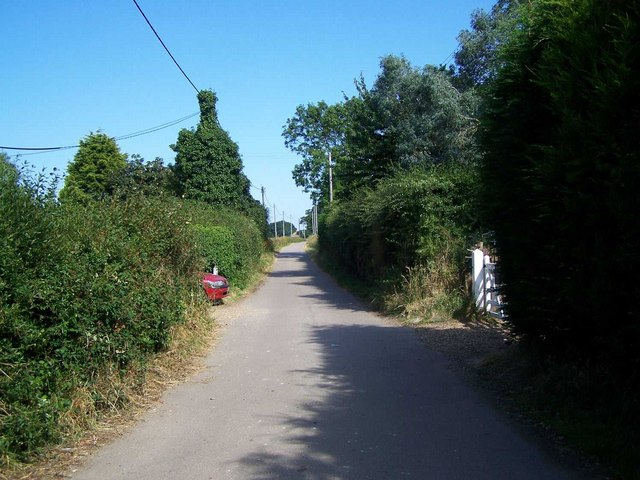
- Track To Old Hall Farm

- Location within Suffolk
- Area: 2.4 km^{2} (0.93 sq mi)
- Population: 40 (2005 est.)
  - Density: 17/km^{2} (44/sq mi)
- OS grid reference: TM514957
- District: East Suffolk
- Shire county: Suffolk
- Region: East
- Country: England
- Sovereign state: United Kingdom
- Post town: Lowestoft
- Postcode district: NR32
- Dialling code: 01502
- UK Parliament: Waveney

Flixton is a civil parish in the north of the English county of Suffolk. It is 2 miles (3.2 km) north-west of Lowestoft in the East Suffolk district.

The parish is sparsely populated with an estimated population of around 40. (Note: 2011 United Kingdom census population data does not report population figures for parishes where the population is small enough to potential identify individuals. As a result no population figure is available for Flixton at the census and its population is recorded with Oulton.) It borders the parishes of Blundeston, Oulton and Corton. The parish council is operated jointly with Blundeston. The B1075 Lowestoft to Somerleyton road crosses the parish.

== History ==
Flixton was recorded in the Domesday Book of 1086 as "Flixtuna". The parish church, which was dedicated to St Andrew, was at least partly in ruins by the 16th century and was abandoned after the Great Storm of 1703 blew off the roof. The ecclesiastical parish was combined with Blundeston. Some ruins, which include 12th-century stonework and Roman bricks possibly reused from the nearby fort at Burgh Castle, remain and are protected as a Grade II listed building and a scheduled monument.

== Flixton Decoy ==
Flixton Decoy, an area of wooded marshland with a 14 acres (5.7 ha) open water lake, is in the west of the parish and within the area of The Broads national park. The lake is believed to have been created as a result of peat digging. It was the site of a duck decoy owned by the Morse family.

Marshland at the edge of the floodplain of the River Waveney extends to the Decoy, with the Lowestoft to Norwich railway line running just to the west of the parish boundary. The nearest railway stations are at Somerleyton and Oulton Broad North.
