= Gisleham =

Village in Suffolk, England

Coordinates: 52.437°N 1.698°E

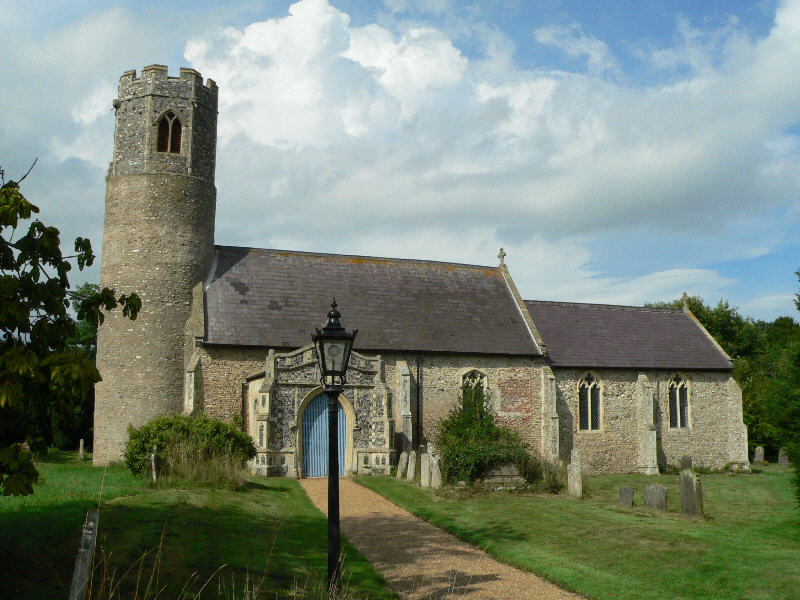
- Holy Trinity, Gisleham

- Location within Suffolk
- Area: 6 km^{2} (2.3 sq mi)
- Population: 778 (2011)
  - Density: 130/km^{2} (340/sq mi)
- OS grid reference: TM514885
- Civil parish: Gisleham
- District: East Suffolk
- Shire county: Suffolk
- Region: East
- Country: England
- Sovereign state: United Kingdom
- Post town: LOWESTOFT
- Postcode district: NR33
- Dialling code: 01502
- UK Parliament: Lowestoft

Gisleham is a village and civil parish in the English county of Suffolk. It is on the edge of Lowestoft, around 5 miles (8.0 km) south-west of the town centre. The parish is in the East Suffolk district, situated between Carlton Colville and Kessingland.

The parish had a population of 778 at the 2011 United Kingdom census. The main A12 road cuts through the eastern portion of the parish close to the North Sea coast. The coastal section of the parish to the east of the main road has developed as a series of holiday parks, including a large Pontins park. (Note: The Pontins holiday park is usually described as being in Pakefield but today lies entirely within the parish of Gisleham. At the start of the 20th-century the area was part of the parish of Pakefield.) The parish extends south as far as the Hundred River where it borders Henstead with Hulver Street and Rushmere parishes.

== History ==
The place name of Gisleham derives from the Old English gysla and ham, meaning "Gysla's Village".

Gisleham Manor is a moated site dating to the 13th century. A house once existed that was enclosed within the moats, and is likely to have been a fortified manor house. The house and associated buildings no longer exist.The site is a scheduled monument.

The lordship of Gisleham Manor was held by a number of families in succession.

== Culture and community ==
Residential development at Bloodmoor Hill on the edge of Carlton Colville has led to a rapid growth in the parish population since the 1980s when it stood at 456. The South Lowestoft Industrial Estate, including a number of large retail stores, has also been built where the parish borders Pakefield on the southern edge of Lowestoft.

The traditional area of the village is centred around the parish church and extends in a linear style. It includes an area of housing at Black Street in the south of the parish and development to the north around the site of the former Gisleham Middle School. This was closed in 2011 as part of a reorganisation of schools in parts of Suffolk, and is now the site of Carlton Colville Primary School.

== Holy Trinity church ==
Holy Trinity church is one of around 40 round-tower churches in Suffolk. (Note: The exact number of round-tower churches in the county is a matter of debate. Some sources list 38, others cite between 40 and 43. They almost all date from the late Anglo-Saxon or early Norman periods and were mostly built between the 11th and 14th-centuries. There are around 183 round-tower churches in England, most of them in Norfolk, which has around 124, and Suffolk. Four of the churches now in Norfolk were previously in Suffolk before boundary changes in 1974.) The church has a late Saxon or early Norman round base topped with a 15th-century octagonal brick crown. The medieval church was restored in 1861 and 1887, and the chancel in 1902 to 1908. It is a Grade I listed building.
