= Kessingland =

Village in Suffolk, England

Coordinates: 52.419°N 1.723°E

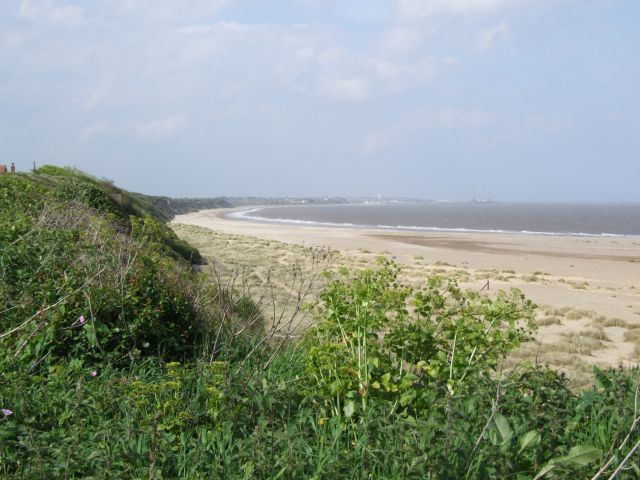
- The coastline at Kessingland

- Location within Suffolk
- Area: 7 km^{2} (2.7 sq mi)
- Population: 4,327 (2011)
  - Density: 618/km^{2} (1,600/sq mi)
- OS grid reference: TM525865
- District: East Suffolk
- Shire county: Suffolk
- Region: East
- Country: England
- Sovereign state: United Kingdom
- Post town: Lowestoft
- Postcode district: NR33
- Dialling code: 01502
- UK Parliament: Lowestoft

Kessingland is a village and civil parish in the East Suffolk district of the English county of Suffolk. It is located around 4 miles (6 km) south of Lowestoft on the east coast of the United Kingdom. It is of interest to archaeologists as Palaeolithic and Neolithic implements have been found here; the remains of an ancient forest lie buried on the seabed. It also lays a claim to being the most easterly village in England.

The parish, which had a population of 4,327 at the 2011 United Kingdom census, borders the parishes of Gisleham, Henstead with Hulver Street and Benacre. It extends from the edge of the Pontins holiday park south of Pakefield in the north to the Hundred River which marks the southern border of the parish. The main A12 road cuts through the parish, bypassing the main built up area of the village.

== History ==
Suffolk was settled by Angles from the fifth century onwards. The name Kessingland may preserve evidence of early Angle naming. One interpretation derives it from Old English elements meaning “land of *Cyssi’s people” (a personal name + -inga- “people of” + land). Another interpretation derives it from Old English cærsing “cress-bed” + land, giving “newly cultivated land at the cress-bed”.

There has been a settlement at Kessingland since Palaeolithic times. Between the Hundred River and Latmer Dam was once a large estuary which was used by the Vikings and Romans. The sea provided the village with its main livelihood, and at one time the village paid a rent of 22,000 herrings to their Lords, which then made it more important than nearby Lowestoft.

The Domesday Book of 1086 records: "Kessingalanda / gelanda: King's land, kept by Roger Bigot; Earl Hugh and Hugh FitzNorman from him; Hugh de Montfort Mill (100 herrings). 43 pigs." Roger Bigod or Bigot was a Norman Knight who came to England in the Norman Conquest.

During the early part of World War II, anti-tank defences and gun batteries were installed at Kessingland to help protect the adjacent stretch of vulnerable coastline and the south of Lowestoft itself. As the threat of invasion receded from 1942 onwards, defence levels were reduced, although the advent of V1s prompted a shift of focus to anti-aircraft defences.

The village comprised two separate communities: the "beach" and the "street" and it was not until the 1960s that more housing united the village into a single community. The population is little over 4,000 – though this can double due to the holiday-makers in the many chalets and holiday villages in the area.

The Suffolk Coast and Heaths area was designated an Area of Outstanding Natural Beauty in 1970 and the Suffolk Coasts and Heath Project runs many conservation projects.

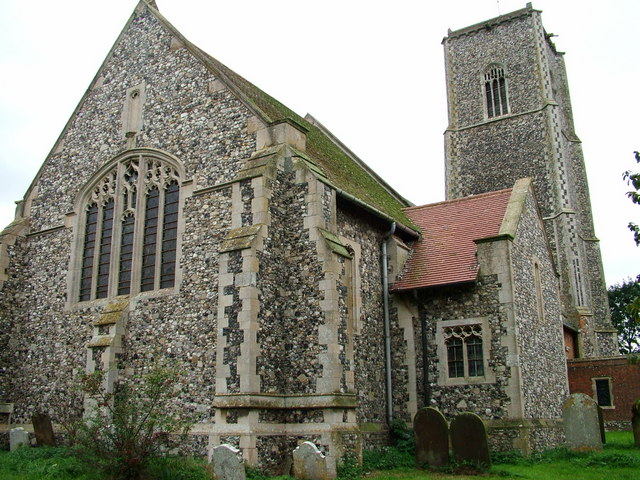
Church of St Edmund, Kessingland

St Edmund's church is one of the finest in the region. With an imposing 98-foot (30 m) tower it was built in around 1436 for the Franciscans of London. The tower, built like many coastal churches to act as a beacon for ships out at sea, constitutes the majority of the medieval structure, the rest having been rebuilt in the ensuing centuries. Renovations continue in the contemporary era, with a new window by Nicola Kantorowicz being added in 2007.

== Governance ==
An electoral ward of the same name exists. This ward includes Gisleham and had a total population at the 2011 census of 5,105.

== Features of the village ==
Kessingland is home to the Hollies Leisure Resort and a Parkdean Resorts holiday park with caravans, chalets and various leisure facilities which are open to the general public, along with other independent parks. There is also a small tearooms housed in a repurposed and refurbished beach hut, which is next to a children's playground and a fish and chip shop. Kessingland is also home to Africa Alive, an African-themed zoo. The village also has a medieval church.

== Connections to the arts ==
Sir Henry Rider Haggard, the author of King Solomon's Mines, was born in Bradenham, but later in his life spent his summers at Kessingland in a cliff-top house called The Grange (now demolished, however a local road, Rider Haggard Lane, is named after Haggard). He was visited by his friend Rudyard Kipling. In a letter to Haggard dated 20 July 1912, his daughter Lillias documented a sighting of a sea serpent off the coast of Kessingland: "we are convinced we saw a sea serpent! I happened to look up when I was sitting on the lawn, and saw what looked like a thin, dark line with a blob at one end, shooting through the water at such a terrific speed it hardly seemed likely that anything alive could go at such a pace ... I suppose it was about 60 feet long." The letter was printed in the Eastern Daily Press shortly after. To counter the force of the North Sea and the winds off it, H. Rider Haggard sloped the cliff on the edge of his property and experimented with growing marram grass upon it. The experiment proved a success, and the slope increased in height rather than decreased. He spent the rest of the year at Ditchingham some 16 miles (26 km) to the west. In 1928 Kessingland Grange was sold to a Mr Catchpole who established a holiday camp in the grounds, and subsequently demolished the Grange. The current Kessingland Cottages development was begun in 1979.

The social history photographer Hardwicke Knight visited Kessingland in the 1950s and documented aspects of the village in a series of 35 mm Kodachrome slide images.

German writer (and sometime lecturer at the University of East Anglia) W. G. Sebald in his second book The Rings of Saturn (German: Die Ringe des Saturn) details a coastal walk along the Suffolk coast. In his book he describes Kessingland beach fishermen with their oilskins and thermoses as resembling "the last stragglers of some nomadic people ... at the outermost limit of the earth, in expectation of the miracle longed for since time immemorial, the miracle which would justify all their erstwhile privations and wanderings." He also mentions nearby Benacre, Lowestoft and Covehithe.

BBC Radio 4's Jan Zalasiewicz recorded a programme about geology on Kessingland's stony beach.

Fashion historian and television presenter Amber Butchart is from Kessingland.

The pioneering cave diver, Penelope Powell, was born in Kessingland in 1904.
