= Rushmere, north Suffolk =

Village in Suffolk, England

Coordinates: 52.425°N 1.674°E

Rushmere
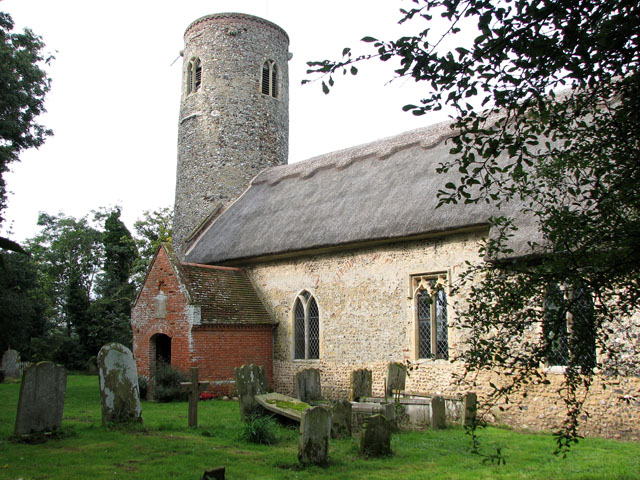
- Church of St Michael and All Angels

- Location within Suffolk
- Area: 3 km^{2} (1.2 sq mi)
- Population: 60 (2016 est)
  - Density: 20/km^{2} (52/sq mi)
- OS grid reference: TM495871
- District: East Suffolk
- Shire county: Suffolk
- Region: East
- Country: England
- Sovereign state: United Kingdom
- Post town: Lowestoft
- Postcode district: NR33
- Dialling code: 01502
- UK Parliament: Suffolk Coastal

Rushmere is a village and civil parish in the East Suffolk district of the English county of Suffolk. The village is around 5 miles (8.0 km) south-west of Lowestoft and 5 1/2 miles (8.9 km) south-east of Beccles. Neighbouring parishes include Gisleham, Henstead with Hulver Street and Mutford. The Hundred River forms the southern boundary of the parish.

Settlement within the parish is dispersed without a village centre. The population was estimated at 60 in 2016. The majority of the land in the parish is agricultural with the name meaning a rushy enclosure or lake.

== History ==
The village was recorded in the Domesday Book with around 18 households as part of the holdings of King William. The population varied between around 100 and 150 between 1800 and 1950 before declining in the later 20th century. In 1846 the manor formed part of the land owned by Samuel Morton Peto. Rushmere Hall, which dates to the 16th century, is a Grade II* listed farmhouse.

The parish church is a round-tower church which dates to the Norman period and is a Grade I listed building. The church is dedicated to St. Michael and All Angels and is situated to the north of the parish, close to the parish boundary with Mutford. The majority of the building is medieval and the roof is thatched. The building was derelict in the 1930s but was restored by the local community and reopened in 2010.
