= Charles Ball (disambiguation) =

Charles Ball (1780–?) was a fugitive slave and soldier in the War of 1812.

Charles Ball may also refer to:

- Charles Ball (politician) (1819–1903), California politician, president of the Chico Board of Trustees, jeweler and watchmaker
- Charles Bent Ball (1851–1916), Irish surgeon
- Charles Richard Ball (1833–1918), Anglican priest
- Charles Clyde Ball (1881–1955), American football and basketball player and coach
- C. Olin Ball (1893–1970), American food scientist
- Sir Charles Arthur Kinahan Ball, 2nd Baronet (1877–1945) of the Ball baronets
- Sir Charles Irwin Ball, 4th Baronet (1924–2002) of the Ball baronets

== See also ==
- Ball (surname)
