= Anderson baronets =

Extinct baronetcy in the Baronetage of the United Kingdom

There have been nine baronetcies created for persons with the surname Anderson, four in the Baronetage of England, one in the Baronetage of Great Britain and four in the Baronetage of the United Kingdom. All creations are extinct.

- Anderson baronets of St Ives (1629)
- Anderson baronets of Penley (1643)
- Anderson baronets of Broughton (1660)
- Anderson baronets of Eyworth (1664)
- Anderson baronets of Mill Hill (1798): see Sir John Anderson, 1st Baronet, of Mill Hill
- Anderson baronets of Fermoy (1813): see Sir James Anderson, 1st Baronet
- Anderson baronets of Parkmount (1911): see Sir Robert Anderson, 1st Baronet (1837–1921)
- Anderson baronets of Ardtaraig (1919): see Sir Kenneth Anderson, 1st Baronet (1866–1942)
- Anderson baronets of Harrold Priory (1920): see Sir John Anderson, 1st Baronet, of Harrold Priory (1878–1963)
