= Benacre =

Benacre may refer to:

- Benacre, Suffolk, a village and civil parish in the East Suffolk district of Suffolk, England
- Benacre NNR, a National Nature Reserve in Suffolk, England
- Benacre Broad, an isolated broad that is part of Benacre NNR
- Benacre Estate and Benacre Hall, the seat of the Gooch Baronetcy of Suffolk, England
- Benacre to Easton Bavents Lagoons, a "Special Area of Conservation" in England
- Benacre, Glen Osmond, South Australia, a house on the Australian Register of the National Estate
