= The King's (The Cathedral) School =

- (Schola Regia Petriburgensis)

Location
- Park Road; Peterborough, Cambridgeshire, PE1 2UE; England
- 52°34′54″N 0°14′19″W

Information
- Type: Academy (partially selective); Cathedral school
- Motto: A Family Achieving Excellence
- Religious affiliation: Church of England
- Denomination: Church of England
- Established: 1541; 485 years ago
- Founder: Henry VIII
- Department for Education URN: 136398 Tables
- Ofsted: Reports
- Dean: The Dean of Peterborough
- Headmaster: John Harrison
- Chaplain: Revd Lex Bradley-Stow
- Gender: Mixed
- Age: 7 to 18
- Enrollment: 1200
- Houses: 4
- Publication: The Petriburgian Magazine
- Alumni name: Old Petriburgians
- Website: kings.peterborough.sch.uk

The King's (The Cathedral) School is a state-funded Church of England Cathedral Chorister School located in Peterborough, England. It is the chorister school for Peterborough Cathedral, and was founded in 1541 by Henry VIII. Former pupils are known as Old Petriburgians.

Although for centuries a boys-only grammar school, "Kings" is now mixed and has a junior department in Madeley House. Madeley House was previously the home for boarders, and many cathedral choristers were boarders there. Today, the school has day pupils only.

As part of the wider chapter of Peterborough Cathedral, the headteacher retains his own stall in the choir today.

== The Cathedral Chorister School ==
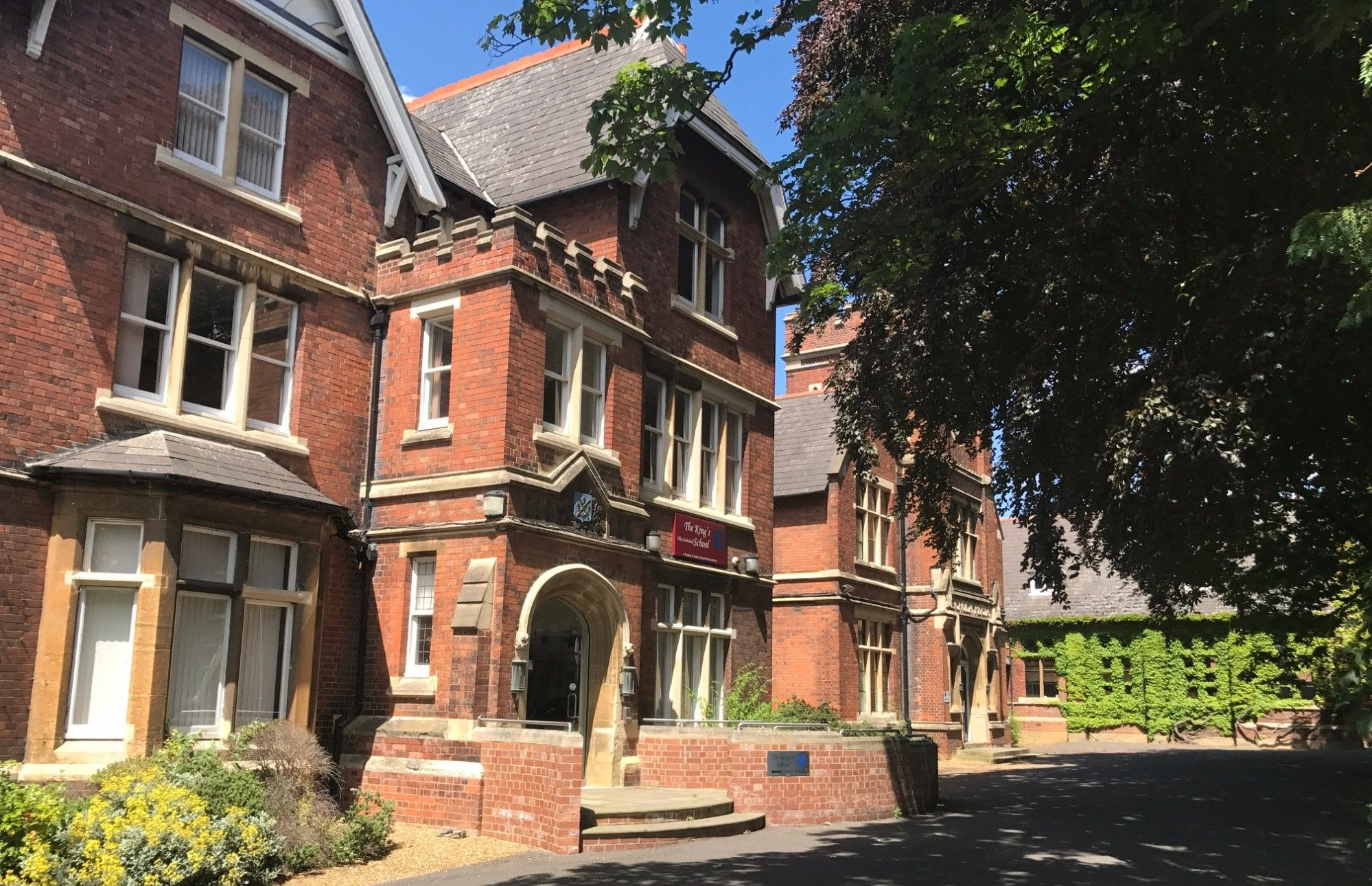
School buildings

The King's School was founded by King Henry VIII in 1541 as the Cathedral School to educate 'twenty poor boys' and is one of seven established, re-endowed or renamed, during the Dissolution of the monasteries. Originally, the school was housed in the Cathedral Precincts at the Becket Chapel. The headmaster was paid £16–3s–4d, his deputy £8 per annum. School began at 5.00 a.m., with prayers in the Cathedral at 6.30 a.m. The curriculum consisted largely of Latin, Greek and Scripture.

The King's School remains the Cathedral Chorister School and educates the boy and girl Cathedral Choristers in Years 3–8. The whole school attend services at Peterborough Cathedral, marking the beginning and end of the 3 school terms. It is one of only three Anglican cathedral schools in the UK to be funded through the state system, the other two being Bristol Cathedral Choir School and The Minster School, Southwell in Nottinghamshire. There are also two state-funded Roman Catholic choir schools: St Edward's College in Liverpool and the London Oratory.

By 1872, the School had 67 pupils and was outgrowing its cramped premises in the Cathedral precincts. The governors moved to purchase land for a new school, initially in Thorpe Road. A fatal accident at the railway crossing caused a change of heart, and the current site was purchased instead on Park Road, which the Peterborough Land Company was in the process of developing. The School was built by John Thompson, a local builder and former pupil; it moved in on 13 October 1885.

== Twentieth century ==
During the Second World War several staff, including the headmaster, joined the armed forces; others were heavily involved in the Home Guard (which used the school facilities for meetings and training), fire-watching and Digging for Victory, on the land then owned in Park Crescent. Female staff joined for the first time and served throughout the War. The staff and the 288 pupils dug trenches on the School Field and at one point a downed German Junkers Ju 88 bomber was exhibited to raise funds for ‘Weapons Week’.

In the early sixties, under the headship of Dr C. M. Harrison, the entire school would traipse up Park Road for morning service at All Saint's C-of-E church. School Inspectors declared this practice to be in contravention of the Education Act 1944's requirement to hold the daily assembly on-site. Also in the 1960s, teaching included Saturday morning classes; and boarders were obliged to attend Sunday matins and/or evensong at the Cathedral.

=== Fee-paying school ===
King's was unusual in once being a grammar school that took boarders, all in School House. Many boarders had parents in the forces and or the colonial services; the very low fees being more affordable than at public schools. The accommodation at 201/203 Park Road (which is now the Music School) was affectionately known as "The Pig", as it was said to have once been the "Pig & Whistle" pub. The building was originally called, and is once more known by those at the school as Madeley House, after Madeley Manor in Shropshire, the family home of Reverend Charles Richard Ball, the original owner of the building.

== Selective state school ==
Until 1976 the school was a Church of England grammar school for around 450 boys. 1976 saw the school become both comprehensive and coeducational. Until 1997, however, there remained provision for boys to board. Since 1976, King's School has been a co-educational state school with around 650 boys and girls. The school acquired Academy status on 1 January 2011 and thus became an independent school while still providing state funded education for all its pupils. On entry to King's in Year 7 pupils are placed in one of five tutor groups, which change upon entry into the fourth year. The school's Junior Department opened in September 2011 for "key stage two" pupils (Ages 7 – 11), including cathedral choristers.

Being a state-funded academy, the school is allowed a degree of selection. Each year 12 places are allocated according to an entry examination and three are allocated according to ability in music; so 12.5% of the school's annual intake is by selection. In addition, there are up to nine places for Cathedral choristers, of both sexes. As with all state schools, King's gives first priority to ensuring that all children in foster families wanting a place at the school receive one. The remaining places are allocated to pupils according to a list of entry criteria, including religion, siblings already attending the school, and geographical distance from the school.

On 1 January 2011, the school became an academy, controversially abandoning its historic name, "King's School, Peterborough", and adopting a new title.

The King's School was recognised in June 1999 with the award of Beacon status; and as of 21 March 2013, the school holds the Ofsted rating of Outstanding. From 2006 to the present As of 2013, The King's School has been the top-performing state school in the Peterborough local authority area for GCSE and A-Level results, with 91%+ of pupils achieving 5 or more passes at GCSE grades 9-4 (Old GCSE A*-C), and an average of 1066.3 As/A-level points per pupil.

In 2019, The Sunday Times Good Schools Guide deemed The King's (The Cathedral School) to be the Best State School in East Anglia.

== Sixth form ==
Almost 1200 pupils attend The King's School, of whom approximately 400 are in the Sixth form, for which there is a minimum examination qualification for internal entry of seven A*–C grades at GCSE level, of which three must be at grade B or above. Given the school's high GCSE pass rate, the majority of pupils proceed into the sixth form. External applicants to the sixth form must meet a set of criteria. The school currently offers no vocational qualifications. The subjects available for study, at AS and A2 level, are:

- Art
- Biology
- Business Studies
- Chemistry
- Classical Civilisations
- Computer Science
- Design and Technology (3D Design & Textiles Design)
- Economics
- English Language and Literature (single award)
- English Literature
- Geography
- History
- Languages (French and German)
- Mathematics (and Further Maths)
- Music
- Physics
- Psychology
- Religious Studies
- Sports Studies

A compulsory double lesson each fortnight named 'Learning for Life' is designed to prepare the pupil for the A Level examinations and for the UCAS application system to universities. All pupils are required to take General Studies A-level, unless timetable scheduling prevents this. The school has a prefect system, comprising: head boy and head girl, deputy head boy and deputy head girl, House captains and vice captains, senior prefects, and prefects.

== Houses ==
The school has four houses: St. Chad's House (house colour red), St. Oswald's House (house colour yellow), St. Peter's House (house colour blue) and School House (house colour green). Two others, Tudor House (house colour was blue) and Thomson's House (house colour was purple), named after former pupil Sir St Clair Thomson, were abolished in 1976. Pupil allocation to houses is random, but siblings generally follow through the same House. When there was a boarding house, all boarders were members of School House. Each house has two House captains and four House vice captains, as well as a House master and/or House mistress. Permanent teachers are also allocated to houses as "House staff", although PE teachers, music teachers, deputy headmaster and the headmaster are not allotted houses to avoid bias.

== House Music ==
"House Music" is the annual competitive event in which each house competes for a trophy by presenting four pieces of modern or traditional music, as follows:

- A Lower School Choir piece (Years 7–9 and for which there is a separate trophy)
- An orchestral piece (for which there is a separate trophy)
- A band piece (for which there is a separate trophy)
- A Senior Choir piece (Years 10–13 and for which there is a separate trophy)
- Finale (in which the entire house takes part and for which, as of 2016, there is a separate trophy)

The House Music event was originally held in the school hall. Growing numbers led to the event being held next at the Broadway Theatre, and in 2007 it moved again to KingsGate Community Church's building in Parnwell. House Music was unable to proceed in the regular fashion in 2020 and 2021. In 2021 it took place in the school hall.

== Histories of the school ==
The school's early history is covered in the Victoria County History of Northampton.

An early history of The King's School was published in 1905 by A. F. Leach, a noted historian. This history ends in 1904 when E. S. T. Badger was headmaster.

In 1966, W. D. Larrett, a former deputy-headmaster, published A History of The King's School Peterborough. The account tells of the pre-reformation school, the foundation of King's by Henry VIII, and of the times when the school was close to bankruptcy and when some headmasters felt obliged to resign. In 2005, the 1966 edition was restored and updated.

== Headmasters ==
A comprehensive history of former archididascali (head teachers) and headmasters titled Mortarboards and Mitres was undertaken jointly by Trevor Elliott (M.A. Edin.) (archivist and headmaster 1993–1994) and local historian Jane King. It was completed in 2017 and is published on the school's website.

Pre-Reformation archididascali (until 1541):
- Thomas Keywood
- Robert Clerke
- Thomas Sharpp

Headmasters of the Cathedral Grammar School endowed by King Henry VIII:

- 1541–1544 Robert [Ralph] Radcliffe, M.A. Cantab.
- 1544–1561 Mr Thomas Hare
- 1561–1567 Richard Stevenson
- 1567–1591 Rev. Simon English, M.A. Cantab.
- 1591–1596 Rev. Thomas Yates
- 1596–1600 Rev. Edward Wager, M.A. Cantab.
- 1600–1605 Mr. Edmund Morrey [Murray], M.A. Cantab.
- 1605–1614 Rev. Humphrey Rowe, M.A. Cantab.
- 1614–1629 Rev. Robert Thurlby, M.A. Cantab.
- 1629–1636 Rev. Henry Dixon, M.A. Cantab.
- 1636–1642 Rev. James Wildbore, M.A. Cantab.
- 1642–1649 Dr. Thomas Wright, M.D. Cantab.
- 1649–1656 Rev. Francis Standish, M.A. Cantab.
- 1656–1658 Mr. James Firth
- 1658–1662 Rev. Richard Bunworth, M.A. Cantab.
- 1662–1683 Rev. Robert Smith, M.A. Cantab.
- 1683–1708 Rev. William Waring, M.A. Cantab.
- 1708–1720 Rev. David Standish, M.A. Cantab.
- 1720–1725 Rev. David Standish Jr, M.A. Cantab.
- 1725–1726 Rev. Edward Poole, M.A. Cantab.
- 1726–1736 Rev. Thomas Bradfield, M.A. Cantab.
- 1736–1757 Rev. Thomas Marshall, M.A. Cantab.
- 1757–1767 Rev. Thomas Marsham, M.A. Cantab.
- 1767–1772 Rev. Charles Favell, M.A. Cantab.
- 1772–1776 Rev. Robert Fowler, LL.B Cantab.
- 1776–1796 Rev. Henry Freeman, M.A. Cantab.
- 1796–1812 Rev. William Loftus, M.A. Cantab.
- 1812–1815 Rev. John Hinde
- 1815–1818 Mr. Christopher Massey
- 1818–1820 Cpt. Thomas Fernyhough, later Governor of the Military Knights of Windsor. He was the first person to be buried in the catacombs beneath St George's Chapel.
- 1820–1830 Rev. Thomas Garbett, M.A. Oxon, FSA.
- 1830–1852 Rev. William Cape, M.A. Cantab.
- 1852–1856 Rev. William Ameers White, M.A. Cantab.
- 1856–1861 Rev. James Wallce, M.A. Cantab.
- 1861–1875 Rev. Edward Bower Whyley, M.A. Cantab.
- 1875–1882 Rev. Walter Debenham Sweeting, M.A. Cantab.
- 1882–1897 Rev. Edward John Cunningham, M.A. Oxon.
- 1897–1903 Rt. Rev. Edward Bidwell, M.A. Oxon, later Bishop of Ontario (1917–1926).
- 1903–1909 Mr. Edward Badger, M.A. Cantab.
- 1909–1913 Mr. Walter Cross, M.A. Cantab.
- 1913–1915 Mr. Archibald Annand, M.C., M.A. Cantab.
- 1915–1932 Rev. Herbert Baxter, M.A. Oxon, B.D. Londin.
- 1932-1932 Mr. Walter Shearcroft, B.Sc.
- 1932–1939 Mr. Oliver Mitchell, M.A. Oxon.
- 1939–1940 Mr. Harry Hornsby, MBE, M.A. Oxon.
- 1940–1946 Mr. Walter Shearcroft, B.Sc.
- 1946–1951 Mr. Harry Hornsby. M.B.E., M.A. Oxon.
- 1951–1969 Rev. Cecil Harrison, M.A. Cantab, previously headmaster of Felsted School.
- 1969–1970 Mr. Kenneth Wheeler, M.A. Oxon.
- 1970–1974 Mr. David Smith, OBE, M.A. Oxon.
- 1974–1993 Mr. Michael Barcroft, M.A. Cantab.
- 1993–1994 Mr. Trevor Elliott, M.A. Edin.
- 1994–2014 Mr. Gary Longman, B.Sc., F.Coll.P Nott.
- 2014–2022 Mr. Darren Ayling, M.A., B.A., M.B.A.
- 2022–present Mr. John Harrison B.A. Lanc.

== Notable alumni ==
Former pupils are known as Old Petriburgians.

- Sir John Archer, Commander-in-Chief, Land Forces (1978–80)
- Sir Thomas Armstrong, Principal of the Royal Academy of Music (1955–68) and Organist of Christ Church, Oxford (1933–1955).
- Andy Bell, member of Erasure
- Paul Barber, 1988 Olympic hockey gold medallist.
- Sir John Benstead, general secretary of the National Union of Railwaymen, deputy chairman of the British Transport Commission.
- J. D. Beresford, science fiction writer and father of Elisabeth Beresford, author of The Wombles
- Peter Boizot, entrepreneur and founder of Pizza Express in 1965
- Frank Close, Professor of Theoretical Physics at the University of Oxford, head of the Department of Physics at the University of Oxford and Fellow of Exeter College, Oxford. Winner of the 2013 Michael Faraday Prize.
- Sir Robert Cotton, English politician and founder of the Cotton library.
- James Crowden, Lord Lieutenant of Cambridgeshire (1992–2002).
- Jamie Day, Crawley Town FC football player.
- John Fletcher, Jacobean dramatist and collaborator with William Shakespeare.
- Brian J. Ford, President Emeritus of University of Cambridge Society for the Application of Research.
- Neil Hubbard, guitarist with Juicy Lucy and Roxy Music.
- Gray Jolliffe, Wicked Willie cartoonist.
- Robert Johnson, Archdeacon of Leicester, Founder of Oakham School and Uppingham School.
- Barry Kay, Professor of Clinical Immunology (1980–2004) at Imperial College London.
- David Lammy, Foreign Secretary, previous Shadow Foreign Secretary, MP for Tottenham since 2000
- Ed Lowe, English track cyclist and Olympian for Great Britain.
- Roger Manvell, first Director of the British Film Academy (1947–1959). Professor of Film, Boston University. Biographer of Adolf Hitler, Rudolf Hess, Heinrich Himmler, Joseph Goebbels and Hermann Göring.
- Tulip Mazumdar, BBC Journalist.
- Claude Morley, entomologist, author of Ichneumons of Great Britain.
- Edward Rainbow, master of Magdalene College, Cambridge, vice-chancellor of the University of Cambridge, Dean of Peterborough and Bishop of Carlisle.
- Richard Reynolds, Archdeacon of Northampton, Dean of Peterborough, Bishop of Bangor, Lord Bishop of Lincoln
- Arthur Robertson, 1908 Olympic Runner.
- Sir St Clair Thomson, throat specialist to King Edward VII, (after whom Thomson's House was named).
- Sir Herbert Watts, General Officer Commanding XIX Corps during the First World War.
- Harry Wells, professional rugby player for Leicester Tigers and England Rugby.

== Miscellaneous ==
In 2003, Timothy Coldwell, a one-time head of Physics, was convicted for downloading indecent images of children.

In 2005, Gavin Lister, a P.E. teacher, was convicted of engaging in sexual activity with a girl between the ages of 13 and 15.

In 2014, headmaster Gary Longman retired after 20 years in the position. His successor was Darren Ayling, formerly senior deputy head (academic) at the Ipswich School in Suffolk.

The school has had links with the Werner-Jaeger-Gymnasium Nettetal in Germany since 1976.

In 2016 deputy headteacher, Trevor Elliot retired after 40 years at Kings. His replacements are: deputy headteacher (pastoral) Helen Birch, formerly assistant headteacher; and deputy headteacher (academic) Duncan Rhodes, from Portsmouth and Plymouth.

In 2017, Andrew Brown, former governor was convicted of possessing indecent images and films of children as young as 3. These included child abuse photos and video. Claimed a man who burgled his house placed the images on devices he had stolen in order to blackmail him. He was jailed for two years, however, did not serve his full sentence.

The school is sometimes known as "KSP", or simply "King's".
