= Covehithe =

Village in Suffolk, England

Coordinates: 52.376°N 1.705°E

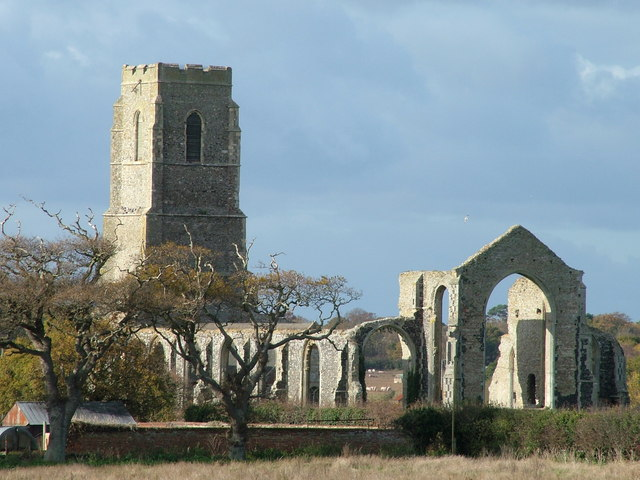
- St Andrew's Church, Covehithe

- Location within Suffolk
- District: East Suffolk
- Shire county: Suffolk
- Region: East
- Country: England
- Sovereign state: United Kingdom
- Post town: Beccles
- Postcode district: NR34
- Dialling code: 01502
- UK Parliament: Suffolk Coastal

Covehithe is a village and civil parish in the East Suffolk district of the English county of Suffolk. It lies on the North Sea coast around four miles (six kilometres) north of Southwold and seven miles (eleven kilometres) south of Lowestoft. Neighbouring settlements include Benacre, South Cove and Frostenden.

The coastline in the Covehithe area suffers from the highest rate of erosion in the UK, and the settlement has suffered significant loss of land and buildings in the past. Attempts to slow erosion are thought to be unsustainable, and estimates suggest that Covehithe will disappear entirely within 100 years. The village is located within the Suffolk Coast & Heaths AONB.

== History ==
A possible section of Roman road has been discovered in the parish which, along with pottery finds and a possible Roman enclosure, suggests that the area was inhabited in the Roman period. Anglo-Saxon remains, including a possible cemetery and evidence of sunken feature buildings, have been found in the area around St Andrew's church and suggest habitation from the post Roman period. A number of mid to late Saxon finds, including an 8th or 9th century dugout canoe found at the coast, support this theory.

At the Domesday survey of 1086 the village is named as Nordhalla or Nordhals, and is recorded as being a medium-sized settlement with 13 households of freemen or smallholders. The land was held by William son of Reginald from William de Warenne, 1st Earl of Surrey, although other tenants in chief included the King and Roger Bigod.

In the Middle Ages Covehithe prospered as a small town and during the reign of Edward I was granted a fair on the feast day of St Andrew. It takes its modern name from the de Cove family who held land there at that time, and the fact that it had a hithe, or quay, for loading and unloading small vessels. By the 17th century however it had fallen victim, like nearby Dunwich, to coastal erosion. The large church of St Andrew, which had been built on the back of its wealth, was largely pulled down, although its tall tower remains, and a smaller thatched church was erected amongst the ruins in 1672. There is archaeological evidence of the linen industry having been carried out at Covehithe until the 18th century.

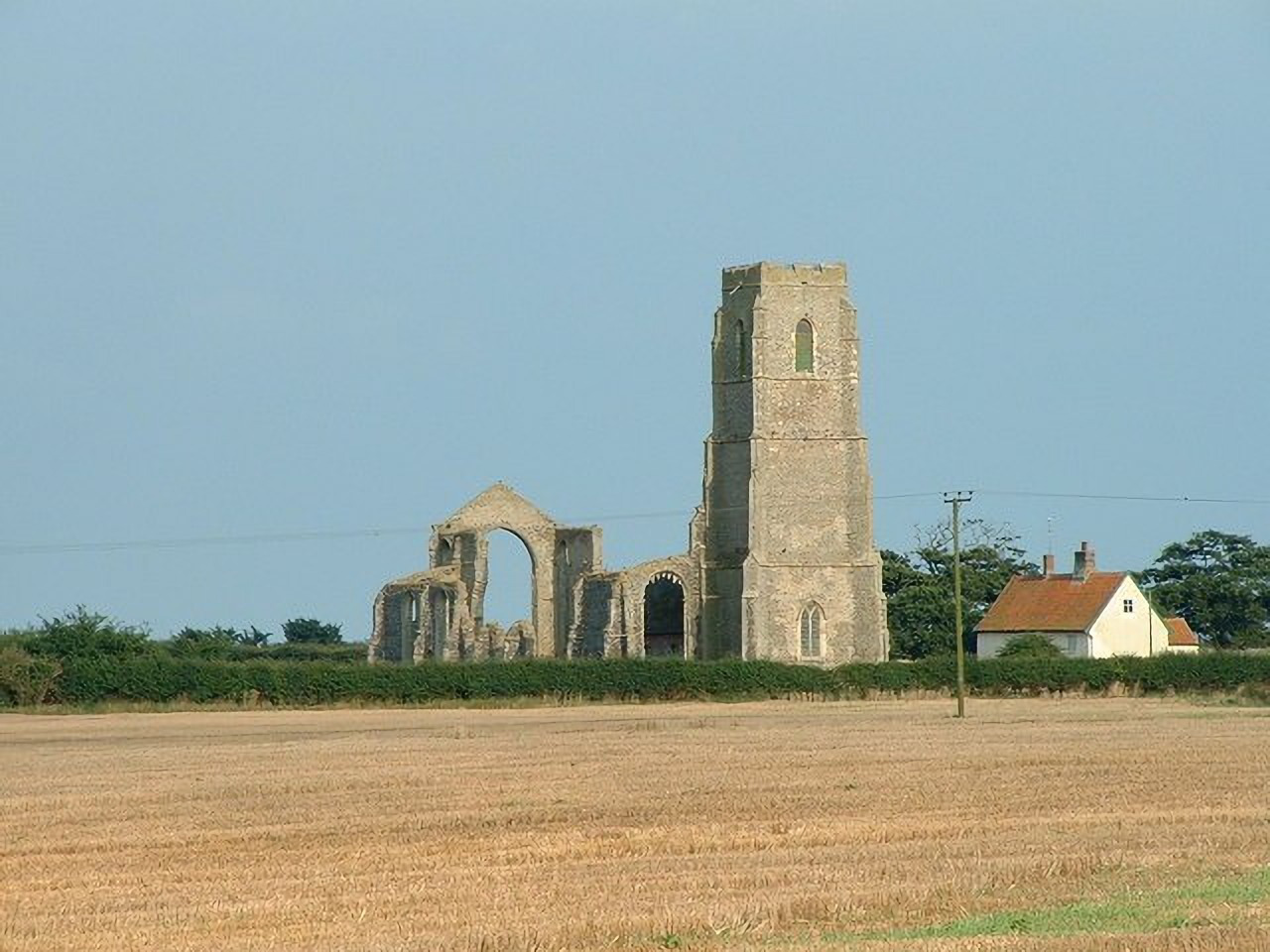
The church of St Andrew at Covehithe. A smaller thatched church lies within its ruins.

In 1910 Peter Ditchfield wrote:

At Covehithe, on the Suffolk coast, there has been the greatest loss of land. In 1887 sixty feet was claimed by the sea, and in ten years (1878–87) the loss was at the rate of over eighteen feet a year. In 1895 another heavy loss occurred between Southwold and Covehithe and a new cove formed.

— Peter Ditchfield, Vanishing England

Erosion caused the coastline at Covehithe to retreat more than 500 metres between the 1830s and 2001, according to contemporary Ordnance Survey maps. This can be seen most obviously on the sand cliffs above the beach where the road running from the church simply falls away down onto the beach. The only recorded pub in the village, the Anchor public house, had closed by 1882 although the building remains in use as a house.

During World War I Covehithe airfield, a night-landing ground, was operated from 1915 to 1919 by the Royal Naval Air Service as a satellite station for RNS Great Yarmouth. The airfield, covering 33 hectares (82 acres) and equipped with searchlights and paraffin lights for night landing, was used for anti-Zeppelin patrols by the Number 73 Wing. In 1918 the station was transferred to 273 Squadron of No. 4 Group RAF which flew DH9, DH4 and Sopwith Camel aircraft from the site. The Covehithe airfield was closed in 1919, its land returned to agricultural use.

During World War II the coastline at Covehithe formed part of the defence line against possible German invasion. A series of pillboxes and other defences were in place, although most of these have since been lost to coastal erosion. A Chain Home Extra Low radar station was established at Covehithe in 1942 by the Royal Air Force.

== Geography ==
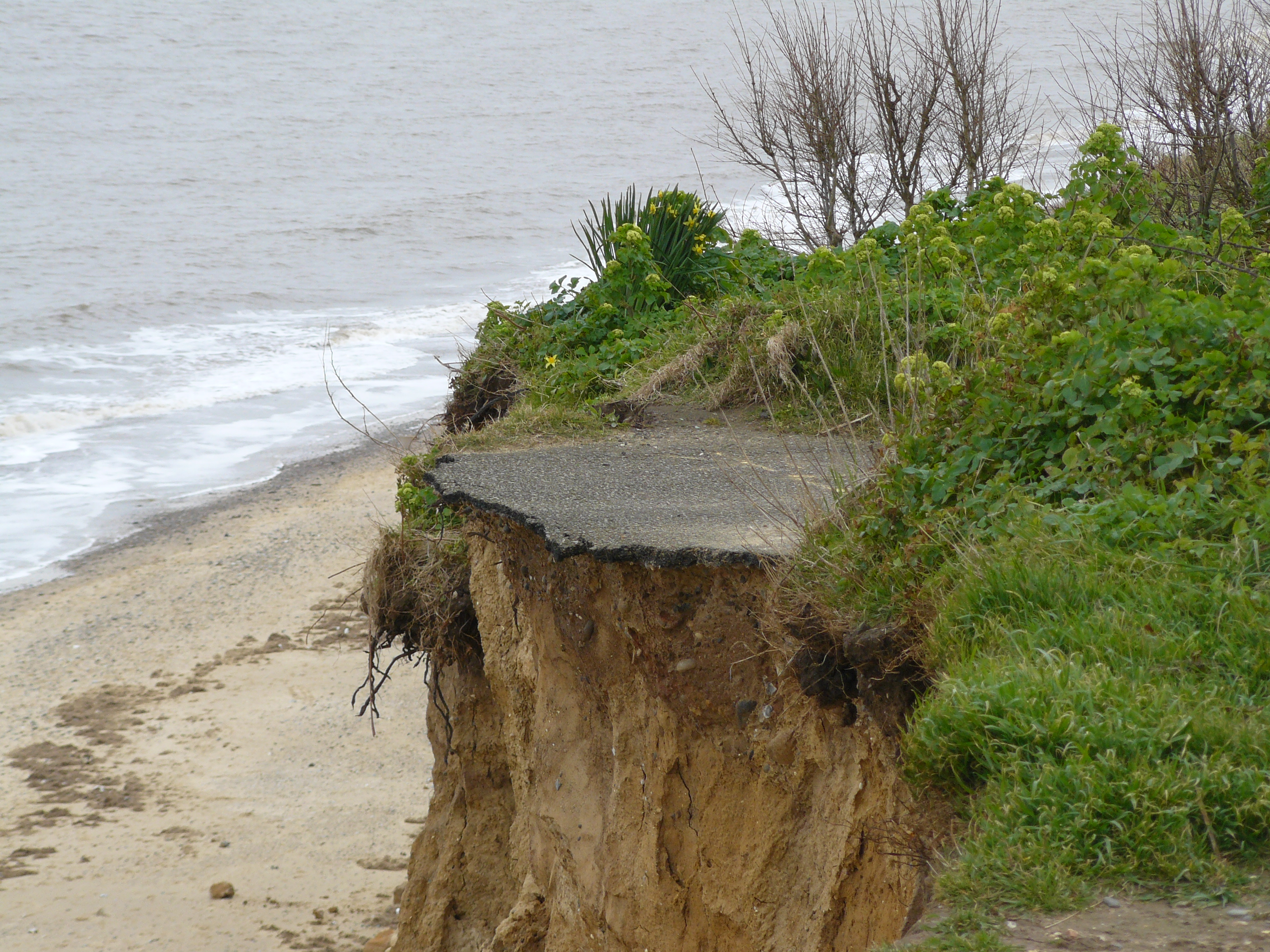
Eroded road running from the church

The coastal cliffs at Covehithe are formed of glacial sands and other deposits. Loose and unconsolidated, they erode rapidly, currently at around 4.5 metres a year, although Environment Agency studies found that 75 metres (250 ft) had been lost between 1992 and 2006 at a rate of 5.3 metres (17 ft) a year. The main part of the settlement at Covehithe, around 250 metres from the current shoreline, is expected to be lost to erosion by 2110, possibly even by 2040. Any future attempts to protect Covehithe are thought to be unsustainable, and would likely increase erosion rates at the larger settlement of Southwold to the south.

To the north of Covehithe, Benacre Broad is an area of open water lagoons and reed beds with a shingle beach and alder carr woodland. These form important habitats for bird species such as marsh harriers, bearded reedling and water rail. Bitterns have been recorded in the area. Along with Covehithe Broad and Easton Broad to the south this forms Benacre National Nature Reserve, and falls within the Pakefield to Easton Bavents Site of Special Scientific Interest.

== Present day ==
Modern Covehithe has a population of around 20. The parish of Covehithe has been combined for ecclesiastical purpose with that of neighbouring Benacre. The area is largely used for agriculture and has formed part of the Benacre Estate since 1742 and owned by the Gooch family since 1746.

A P. D. James mystery, Death in Holy Orders, was set in Covehithe, and a television episode was filmed at the church ruins, and in 1999–2000 an adaptation of David Copperfield filmed a boat beach scene on the beach nearby. The village also featured in W. G. Sebald's The Rings of Saturn, a record of the author's journey on foot through coastal East Anglia. The Monty Python sketch "The First Man to Jump the Channel" was partly filmed at Covehithe beach.

== See also ==
- Easton Bavents
