= Ball baronets of Merrion Square and Killybegs (1911) =

Escutcheon of the Ball baronets of Merrion Square and Killybegs

The Ball Baronetcy, of Merrion Square in the County and City Dublin and of Killybegs in the County of Donegal, was created in the Baronetage of the United Kingdom on 23 June 1911 for the Irish surgeon Charles Ball. He was Regius Professor of Surgery at Trinity College Dublin, and President of the Royal Academy of Medicine of Ireland. His eldest son, the second Baronet, was also Regius Professor of Surgery. He died without male issue and was succeeded by his younger brother, the third Baronet. He was Professor of Botany at University College, Colombo, Sr Lanka. As of 2023 the title is held by the latter's grandson, the fifth Baronet, who succeeded his father in 2002.

== Ball baronets, of Merrion Square and Killybegs (1911) ==
- Sir Charles Bent Ball, 1st Baronet (1851–1916)
- Sir Charles Arthur Kinahan Ball, 2nd Baronet (1877–1945)
- Sir Nigel Gresley Ball, 3rd Baronet (1892–1978)
- Sir Charles Irwin Ball, 4th Baronet (1924–2002)
- Sir Richard Bentley Ball, 5th Baronet (born 1953)

The heir presumptive is Christopher Nigel Morton Ball (born 1951), first cousin of the present holder. His heir apparent is his only son Peter Jonathan Ball (born 1981).<ref name="Debrett">Debrett's Peerage and Baronetage. London: Debrett's Peerage. 2000. p. B52. ISBN 033354577X.</ref

== Notes ==
Baronetage of the United Kingdom
Preceded by Anderson baronets	Ball baronets of Merrion Square and Killybegs; 23 June 1911	Succeeded by Bethell baronets
