= South Cove =

South Cove may refer to the following places:

- South Cove, Boston, former name for an area of Bay Village, Boston, Massachusetts
- South Cove, Lake Mead, on the Arizona side of the reservoir
- South Cove, Suffolk, village and parish in the United Kingdom
