= South Cove, Suffolk =

Civil parish in Suffolk, England

Coordinates: 52.369°N 1.670°E

South Cove
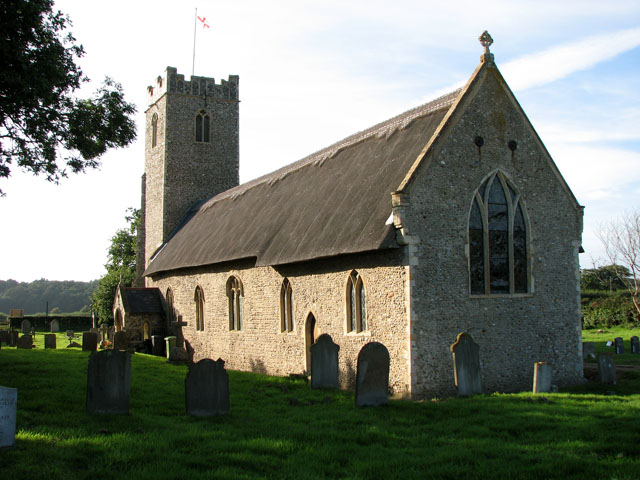
- St Lawrence's church

- Location within Suffolk
- Area: 4.9 km^{2} (1.9 sq mi)
- Population: 20 (2005 est.)
  - Density: 4/km^{2} (10/sq mi)
- OS grid reference: TM499809
- District: East Suffolk
- Shire county: Suffolk
- Region: East
- Country: England
- Sovereign state: United Kingdom
- Post town: Beccles
- Postcode district: NR34
- Dialling code: 01502
- UK Parliament: Lowestoft

South Cove is a civil parish in the east of the English county of Suffolk. It is 3 miles (4.8 km) north of the coastal town of Southwold and 1 mile (1.6 km) south of the village of Wrentham in the East Suffolk district. Neighbouring parishes include Covehithe, Frostenden and Reydon as well as Wrentham. The village lies to the east of the main A12 road, on the B1127 road between Wrentham and Southwold, and is around 1 1/2 miles (2.4 km) from the North Sea coast.

The parish is sparsely populated. At the 1981 United Kingdom census it had a population of 35 in 11 inhabited houses; (Note: The 1981 census was the last time the population of South Cove as a parish was recorded.) in 2005 the population was estimated to be around 20. The parish council operates as a joint council with Frostenden and Uggeshall.

== History ==
Archaeological remains in the parish include flint tools from the Neolithic period (4,000 to 2,000 BCE) and two possible round barrow sites that may date to the Bronze Age (2,400 to 700 BCE). A series of earthworks in the west of the parish were partially excavated during the 1950s and may be the remains of a camp used by Danish invaders during the Anglo-Saxon period or of a dock recorded in the Domesday Book as being at Frostenden. Claude Morley discussed the possible origins of the site in 1923.

South Cove is mentioned in the Domesday Book, at which point it was known simply as Cove, (Note: The addition of South to the parish name was to distinguish it from both Covehithe and North Cove, a parish to the north on the border with Norfolk. The parish was still being recorded as Cove (South) by William White in 1844 and John Marius Wilson in the 1870s.) as part of Blything Hundred. The population was listed as 12 households, with Count Alan of Brittany and Robert Malet holding land in the village.

By the 13th century the parish church was owned by Rumburgh Priory, a Benedictine priory established during the 11th century. The manor, which was combined with Covehithe to form the manor of South Cove and North Hales, was held by a variety of owners until it was bought by the Blois family in the late 17th century. (Note: The seat of the Blois family was at Cockfield Hall at Yoxford.) A second manor, named Polfrey or Blueflory-Cove, was owned by the Gooch baronets of Benacre Hall by the start of the 19th century. The family owned most of the land in South Cove and in neighbouring Covehithe by the middle of the century and remain the major landowners in the area. An Act of Parliament to enclose land in the parish was passed in 1797.

The population of the parish peaked during the mid-19th century at around 200. It declined rapidly after the 1930s. The land has always been primarily used for agriculture, although clay dug in the parish was used for brick making at Cove Bottom from the 1870s until 2005. During World War II the parish formed part of the immediate invasion defences and a number of anti-tank ditches and other invasion defences were built. From 1944 a heavy anti-aircraft battery operated in the east of the parish.

== Geography ==
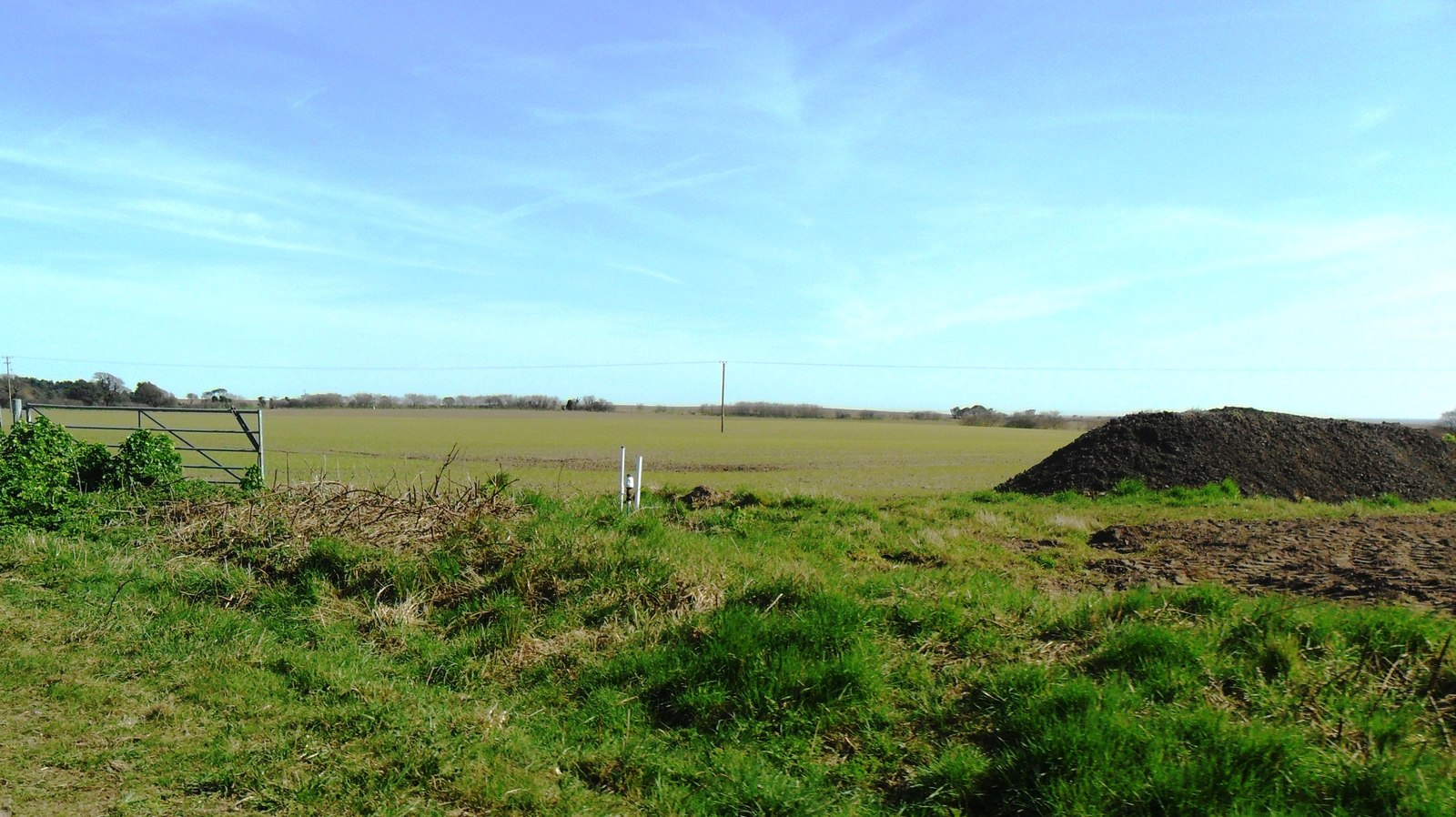
Agrciculrutal land in the parish

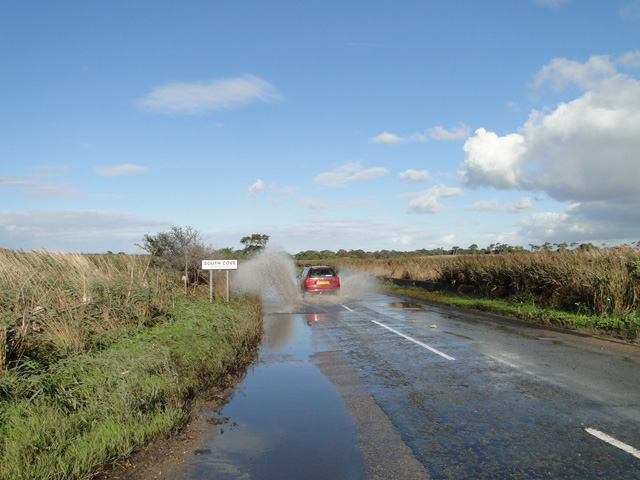
Potter's Bridge on the B1127 on the southern edge of the parish

The majority of the land in the parish is used for agriculture, primarily arable crops. The underlying geology of Norwich Crag Formations is overlain with glacial clays, sands and gravels. The majority of the parish is classified as forming part of the North Suffolk Sandlings landscape with quick draining sandy soils. The Sotterley and Benacre farmland plateau, with clay soil, extends into the north-east of the parish area. This produces a gently rolling landscape suited to arable crops.

The southern and eastern boundaries of the parish feature areas of low-lying wetlands with marshland and reed beds classified as estuarine marsh. These form part of the Pakefield to Easton Bavents coastal Site of Special Scientific Interest, with areas in the south-east of the parish falling into the Benacre National Nature Reserve and the Benacre to Easton Bavents Lagoons Special Area of Conservation and Special Protection Area. Much of the parish is designated as part of the Suffolk Coast and Heaths, an Area of Outstanding Natural Beauty.

The B1127 roads crosses the marshland at Potter's Bridge, linking the parish to Reydon and Southwold to the south. The area has been subject to flooding, leading to extended road closures. The marshland areas were navigable in the early medieval period, with a port recorded at neighbouring Frostenden at the Domesday survey. The coast at Covehithe to the east and the former parish of Easton Bavents to the south-east, (Note: Easton Bavents was merged with Reydon in 1987.) are subject to rapid coastal erosion.

== Religion ==
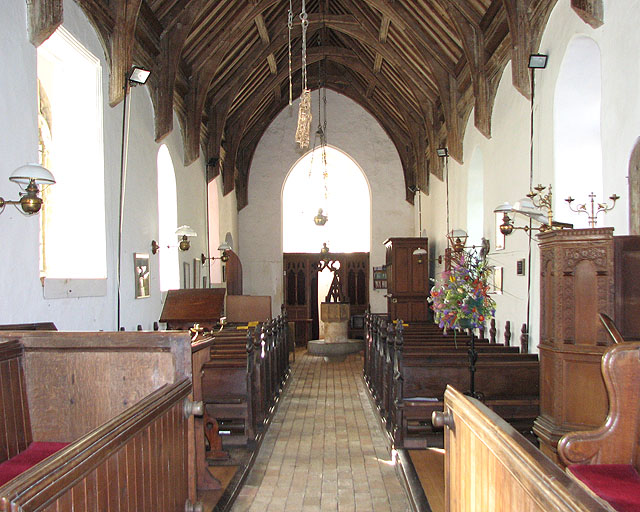
Interior of the church of St Lawrence

The Church of England parish church of St Lawrence is in the centre of the parish alongside the B1127. It possibly dates from the late Saxon period and may have been included as one of the two churches listed at Frostenden at the Domesday survey. It is certainly Norman at the latest, with a 12th-century nave with original doorways and a chancel that dates from the 14th-century. It has a thatched roof and a tall, flint-built tower which dates from the 15th-century. Windows in the nave date from as early as 1300 and a piscina in the chancel has been dated to the 13th-century.

Part of the rood screen survives, and a 15th-century painting of St Michael was rediscovered in 1929 and restored by Ernest William Tristram in the 1930s. Many of the original features of the church were destroyed by William Dowsing in the 1640s as part of the Puritanical movement, and it is possible that this painting was white-washed or plastered over to protect it from Dowsing. The church was restored in 1877 and the building designated as Grade I listed in 1953. Today the parish is part of the Sole Bay benefice, a group of eight churches administered from St Edmund's Church, Southwold. The weathered 15th-century font in the church may have been moved from Dunwich after the loss of one the town's churches to coastal erosion and flooding.

The churchyard features a war memorial with five names from World War I and three from World War II. It is Grade II listed and also mentions the loss of an American Air Force plane in the parish in March 1945. The B24 Liberator bomber of the 409th Bombardment Squadron, 93d Bombardment Group, crashed near the church with the loss of all nine crew members. A hand-written memorial inside the church lists their names alongside the names of the men on the war memorial.

The church was used as a filming location for the 2001 film Iris, a biopic of Iris Murdoch.

== Culture and community ==
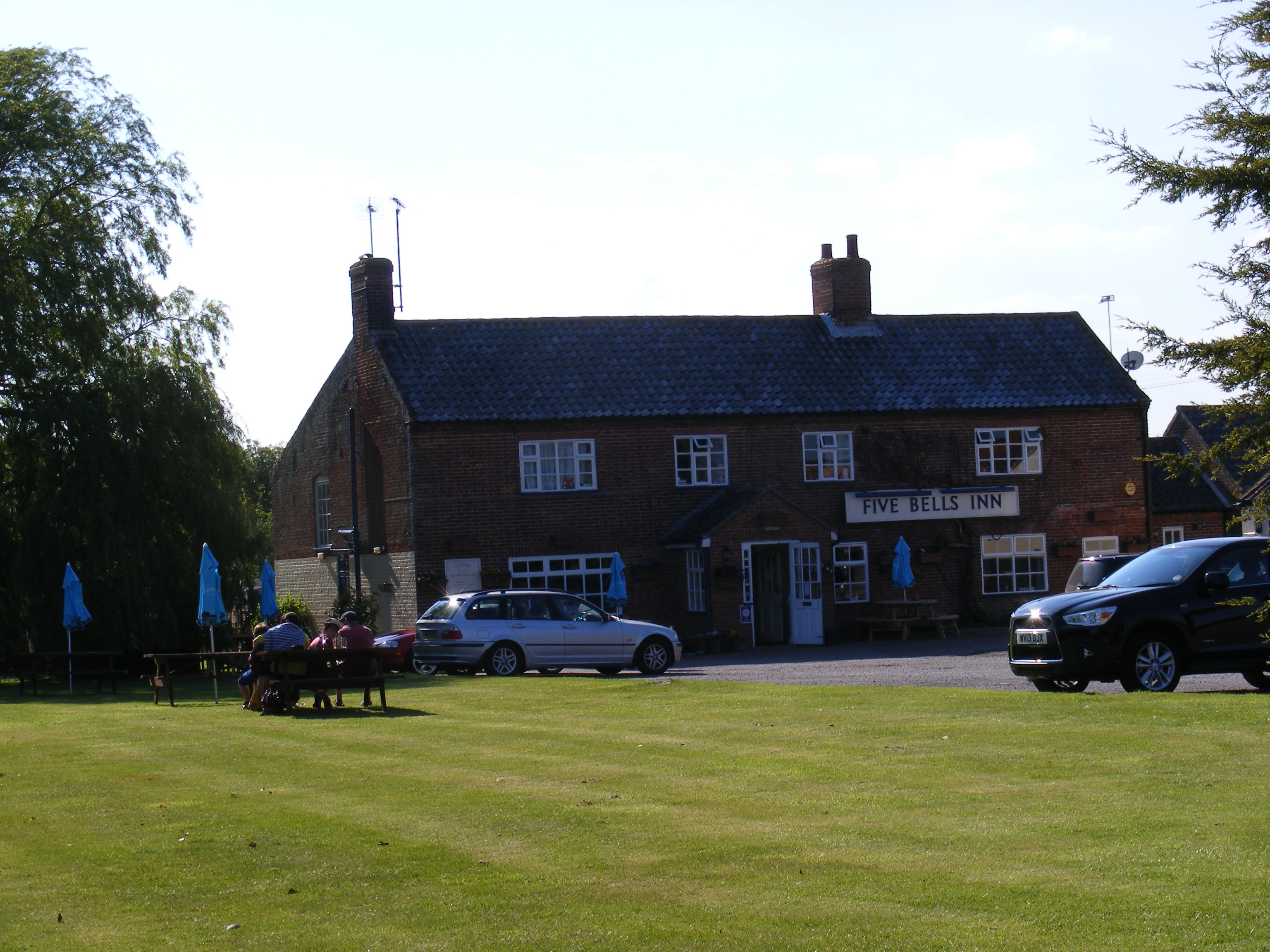
The Five Bells public house on the northern border of the parish

The population of the parish is concentrated in a small cluster of buildings around the church and another at Cove Bottom, close to the site of the former brickworks. The Five Bells public house on the northern edge of the parish is technically within the parish area but generally considered to be within Wrentham. It has operated since at least 1835. Another pub, The Chequer, is known to have been put up for sale in 1801, although this may have been an earlier name for the Five Bells.

Other than the church and pub, the parish has no services, although it shares a village hall with Frostenden. A Sunday School is known to have operated during the 1830s.
