= Frostenden =

Village in Suffolk, England

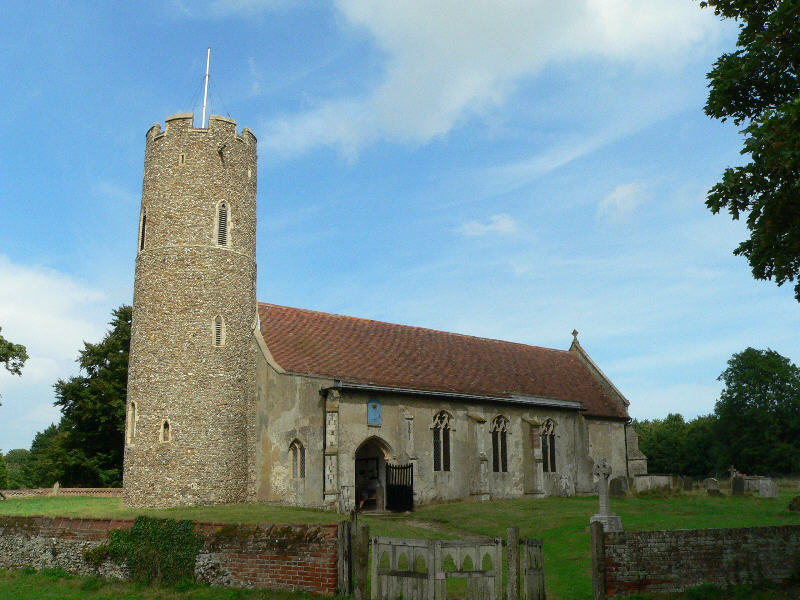
- Frostenden All Saints

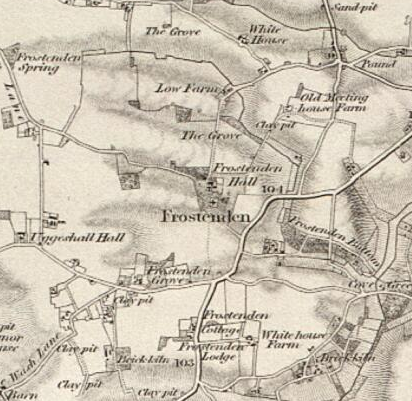
- 19th Century Map of Frostenden

- Location within Suffolk
- Population: 167 (2011 Census)
- Civil parish: Frostenden
- District: East Suffolk
- Shire county: Suffolk
- Region: East
- Country: England
- Sovereign state: United Kingdom
- Post town: BECCLES
- Postcode district: NR34
- Dialling code: 01502
- Police: Suffolk
- Fire: Suffolk
- Ambulance: East of England

Frostenden is a village and civil parish in the East Suffolk district of the English county of Suffolk. It is around 8 miles (13 km) south-west of Lowestoft and 3.5 miles (5.6 km) north-west of Southwold and lies on the A12 road between Wrentham and Wangford. Neighbouring parishes include Wrentham, Sotterley, Uggeshall, Wangford with Henham, Reydon and South Cove.

At the 2011 United Kingdom census the population of the parish was 167. The parish council operates jointly with the neighbouring parishes of South Cove and Uggeshall. The parish church, All Saints, is one of around 40 round-tower churches in Suffolk. (Note: The exact number of round-tower churches in the county is a matter of debate. Some sources list 38, others cite between 40 and 43. They almost all date from the late Anglo-Saxon or early Norman periods and were mostly built between the 11th and 14th-centuries. There are around 183 round-tower churches in England, most of them in Norfolk―which has around 124―and Suffolk. Four of the churches now in Norfolk were previously in Suffolk before boundary changes in 1974.)

== History ==
Frostenden appears in the Domesday Book. Prior to the Norman Conquest the manor, which had three carucates of land, was held by Thorth son of Ulfkil. (Note: Also referred to as Thored and Toret, Thorth held up to 16 manors prior to the conquest, all of them in East Anglia. These included at Wangford, Bulcamp and Reydon, all close to Frostenden.) In 1086 it formed part of the land held by Ralph Baynard and was part of Blything Hundred. The population was listed as 33 households, or approximately 165 people. (Note: Open Doomsday estimates five people living in a household.)

The village is listed as having two churches at the time of the Domesday survey, although one of these may be the church of St Lawrence in neighbouring South Cove. A port is recorded in the parish in 1086, with salt production having also taken place prior to the survey. It is believed that this was sited along the eastern boundary of the modern parish where the low-lying marshland which forms the border with South Cove was previously navigable.

During the 1870s, Frostenden was described by John Marius Wilson in the Imperial Gazetteer of England and Wales:

The property is divided among a few. The living is a rectory in the diocese of Norwich. Value, £348. Patron, Thomas Barne, Esq. The church is chiefly early English; has a round western tower; and contains an early English piscina and a later English font. Charities, £28.

=== Mound ===
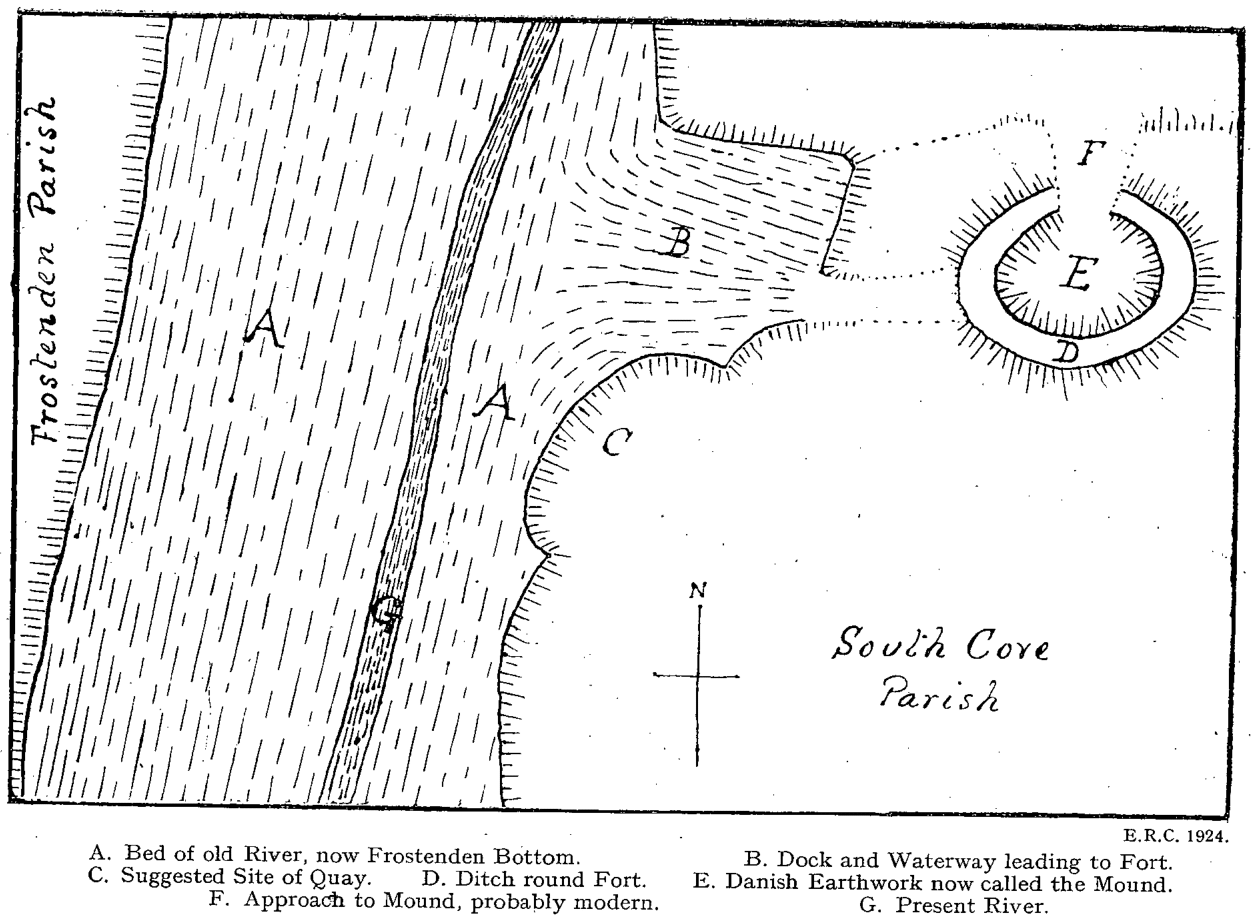
A map by Ernest Cooper of the earthworks they found and their understanding of how the sea port would have been laid out.

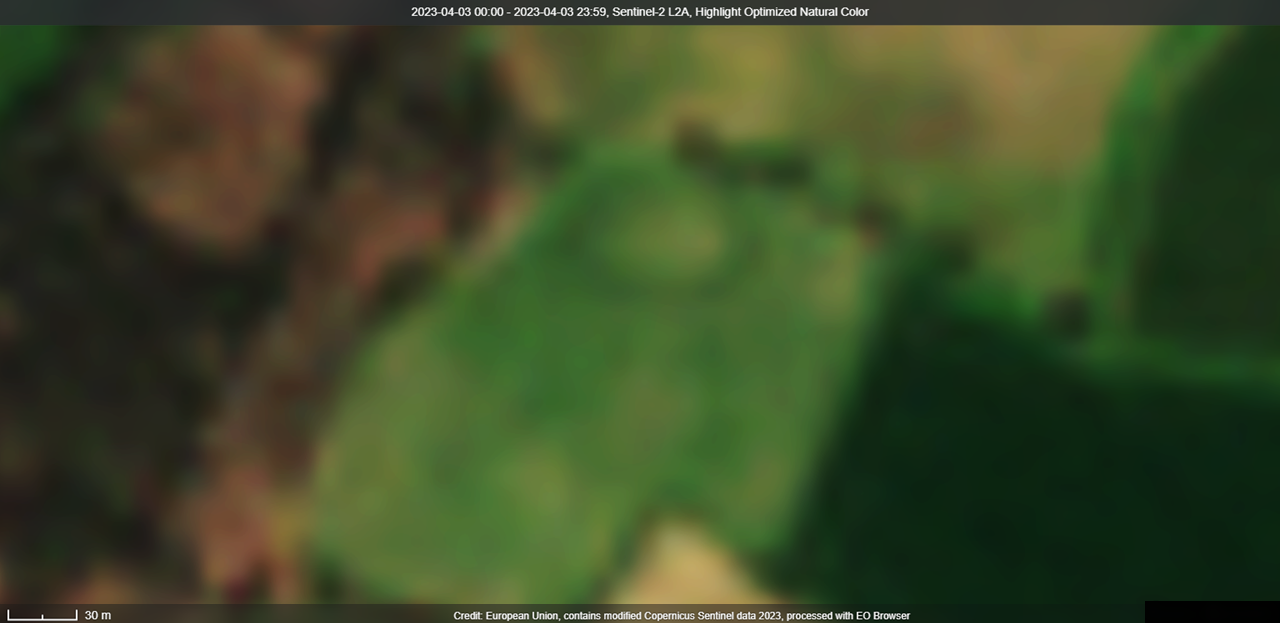
A satellite image of the mound with a scale

There is a historically significant mound and ditch (52.3644°N 1.6605°E) typically described as in Frostenden and associated with the sea port recorded at Domesday, but actually across the parish boundary in South Cove. It is approximately equidistant between Frostenden Corner and Cove Bottom. It is a suspected Viking-era Danish fortification, the only one in Suffolk identified by Ben Raffield's study of the National Monuments Record, Medieval Archaeology, Archaeology Data Service, and Suffolk's Historical Environmental Record.

The site may have been excavated by Eustace Grubb, which would have predated Morley's involvement.

It was first suggested as a Danish fortification by Claude Morley in 1924, after finding a site on the nearby river bank that he suspected to be the Domesday port. Ernest Cooper, writing with Morley, stated that the fort was built to protect the port, which included a dock in which the Vikings would lay up ships for the winter, though also said it may be a ship burial. Sometime between its discovery and 1951, Hugh Braun suggested it was too small to be a Danish fortress and was more likely the location of a Normal hall.

The site was the excavated by Peter Woodard in January to February 1951. He told journalists that it might be a ship burial, but later stated in a letter to the East Anglian Daily Times that it was only one of a number of possibilities he was considering. During the excavation, he found glazed tiles (which he dated to the thirteenth century), a Gallic pot, the foundations of a wall, the remains of timber, evidence of burning and a mound of burnt flint at the jetty. (Note: can be found in. can be found in "Newspaper clippings" (1949–1990). Collings Collection, ID: 2089/2/5/7/1. Ipswich: The Hold, Suffolk Archives.)

Basil Brown visited the site with Guy Maynard (then curator of Ipswich Museum) during the excavation (on 31 January), and suggested it might have been constructed to prevent landing from the river. Officials from the British Museum observed the excavations but were sceptical of it being a ship burial as well, suggesting it may be a medieval farm house. Woodard finished the excavation in May 1951, declaring it to be inconclusive and that a large scale excavation in the future by someone more competent than him would be needed to tell. However, he said "for various reasons" he remained convinced that it was a ship burial.

It was surveyed again by Charles W. Phillips, working as an archaeological officer for Ordnance Survey in 1954, who stated that it was unlikely to be a ship burial as these were constructed on the highest available land near the water, and the mound is within a slight valley. He added that while it was not impossible for it to be a fortification, "it is very oddly sited in relation to the surrounding ground", again because of the valley. Phillips described the suggested dock as "not impossible but very difficult to prove."

The site was surveyed again on 11 January 1972. The surveyor stated that "its position rules out the possibility of it being a round barrow, motte, or windmill mound" and that the suggested dock "is a line of natural slopes".

The river was dredged around 1978, during which pottery, oyster shells, and bones were found, possibly from where the docks were situated though the location was not recorded.

Gatehouse Gazetteer opined that statements dismissing the possibility of it being a fortification were probably overstated and "based on false ideas about the function of castles." It describes it as "a ditched mound, with a palisade and clearly used in C11."

== Demography ==
In 1881, the population of the parish was 386; by 2011 it had decreased to 167. The highest population recorded was in the 1851 census with a total of 456 people.

== Church of All Saints' ==
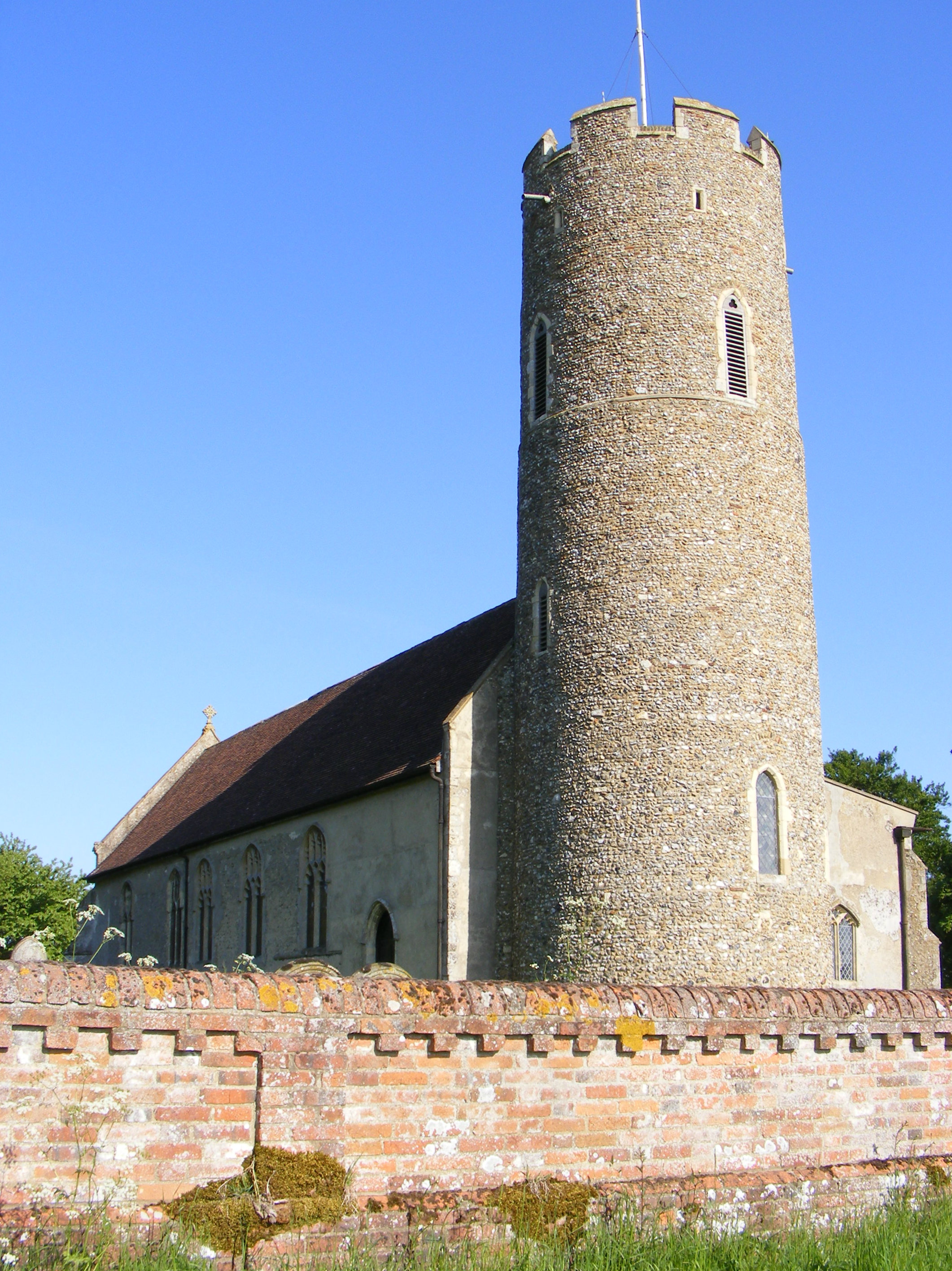
All Saints' Church, Frostenden

A key feature of Frostenden is the round-tower church, which is now a Grade I listed building. The tower is one of the oldest in Suffolk and dates back to either the Norman or Saxon era. The church however dates back to the 13th century. Above the southern door to the church sits a distinctive and bright sundial, thought to be from the 18th century, reading "vigilate et orate" meaning "Watch and Pray" in Latin. The stained glass windows of the church are much newer, dating back to the early 20th century.

There are several memorials on the site of the church, for both World War I and the World War II. Unusually for the area, the parish lost more men during the Second World War, which is uncommon in rural areas.
