= Pakefield to Easton Bavents =

Protected area in Suffolk, England

Coordinates: 52.38°N 1.7°E

- Site of Special Scientific Interest
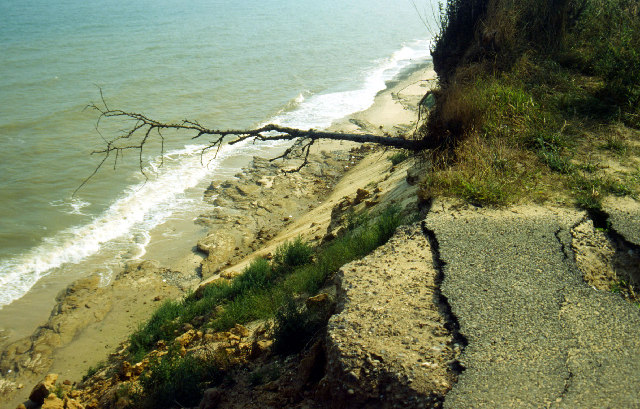
- Cliffs at Covehithe
- Location of Pakefield to Easton Bavents.
- Area of search: Suffolk
- Grid reference: TM 519 818
- Interest: Biological geological
- Area: 735.4 hectares
- Notification date: 2005
- Location map: Magic Map

Pakefield to Easton Bavents is a 735.4-hectare (1,817-acre) biological and geological Site of Special Scientific Interest which stretches along the Suffolk coast between Lowestoft and Southwold. It includes three Geological Conservation Review sites, and part of the Benacre National Nature Reserve. An area of 326.7 hectares is the Benacre to Easton Bavents Lagoons Special Area of Conservation, and 470.6 hectares is the Benacre to Easton Bavents Special Protection Area under the European Union Directive on the Conservation of Wild Birds. The site is also partly in the Suffolk Coast and Heaths Area of Outstanding Natural Beauty.

The site is described by Natural England as nationally important for its exposures of the Lower Pleistocene Norwich Crag Formation, its vegetated shingle features, saline lagoons, flood-plain fens, its nationally scarce vascular plants, and for its scarce breeding birds and wintering bitterns.
