= Nigel Ball =

Irish-born professor (1892–1978)

Sir Nigel Gresley Ball, 3rd Baronet (27 August 1892 – July 1978) was Professor of Botany at Ceylon University College, Sri Lanka, (1924–1943).

== Background and family ==
Ball was the younger son of Sir Charles Bent Ball and his wife Annie Julia Kinahan.

On 28 December 1922, he married Florine Isabel Irwin, the daughter of Colonel Herbert Edwardes Irwin.

== Education ==
He was educated at Trinity College, Dublin, graduating BA, DSc, and later MA.

== Career ==
He served with the Royal Dublin Fusiliers and was promoted to captain.

He was a Professor of Botany between 1924 and 1943 at University College, Colombo, then moved to King's College London, where he was a lecturer in Botany (1944–1955), Reader in Botany (1955–1957), and Special Reader in Botany (1957–1959).

== Title ==
On 21 December 1945, Ball succeeded his brother as a baronet (3rd UK Baronet Ball, of Merion Square, Dublin and Killybegs, County Donegal, created 1911).

Baronetage of the United Kingdom
Preceded by Charles Ball	Baronet (of Merion Square, Dublin and Killybegs, County Donegal); 1945–1978	Succeeded by Charles Ball
