= Sir Robert Anderson, 1st Baronet =

Irish businessman and politician

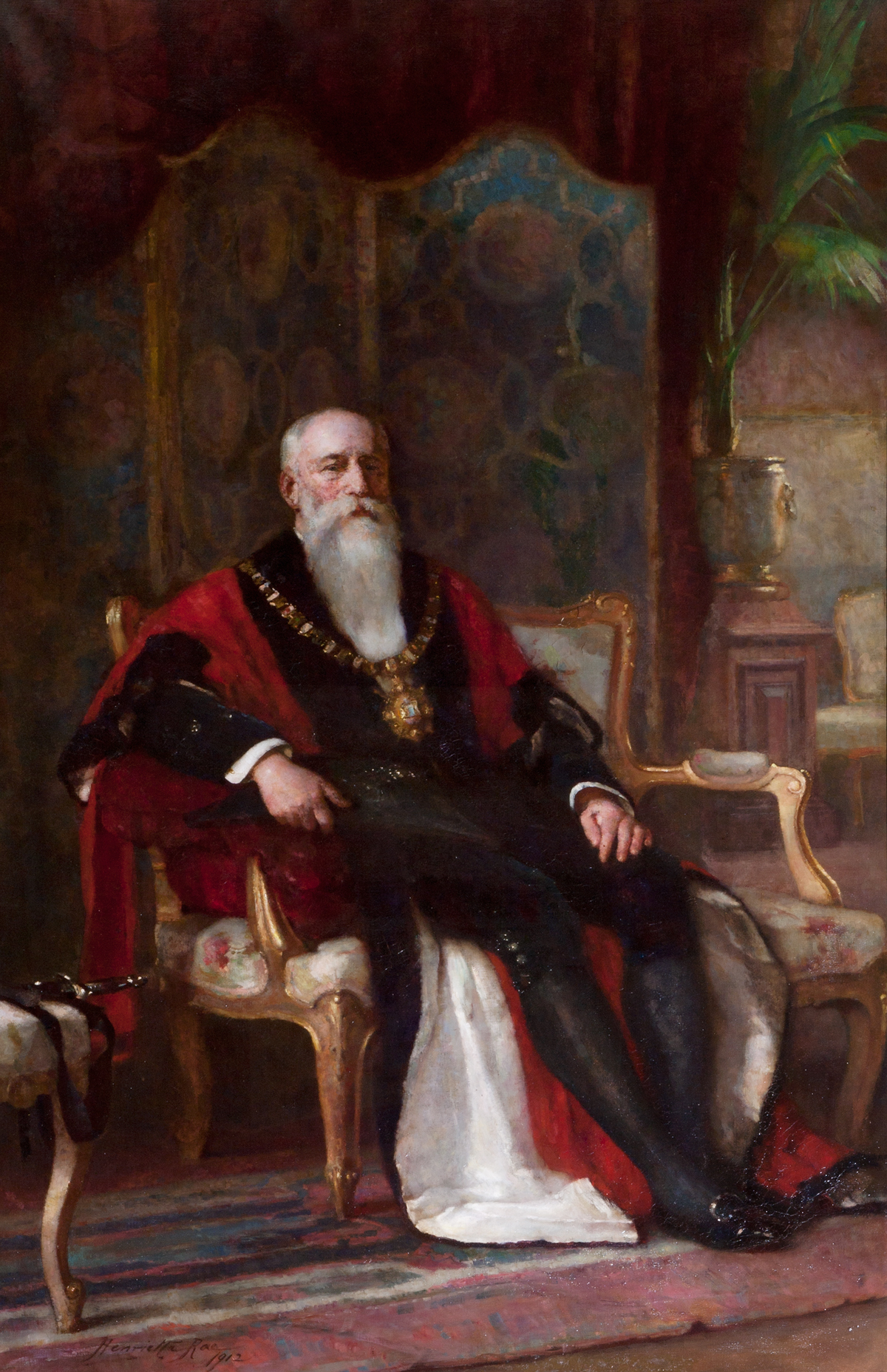
Sir Robert Anderson, as Lord Mayor

Sir Robert Anderson, 1st Baronet (8 December 1837 – 16 July 1921), was an Irish businessman, High Sheriff and Lord Mayor of Belfast.

== Early life ==
He was the son of James Anderson, of Corbofin, County Monaghan, and his wife Elizabeth Ker, daughter of Andrew Ker of Newbliss. He moved to Belfast at the age of 15, going to work in the business of John Arnott.

== Business ==
In 1861 Anderson and John B. McAuley founded Anderson & McAuley, a drapery business and Belfast department store. In 1874, as "Importers, Manufacturers and Warehousemen", they advertised at their Donegall Place store "Irish Linens, Irish Poplins, Irish Lace, &c.", with "real Balbriggan hosiery".

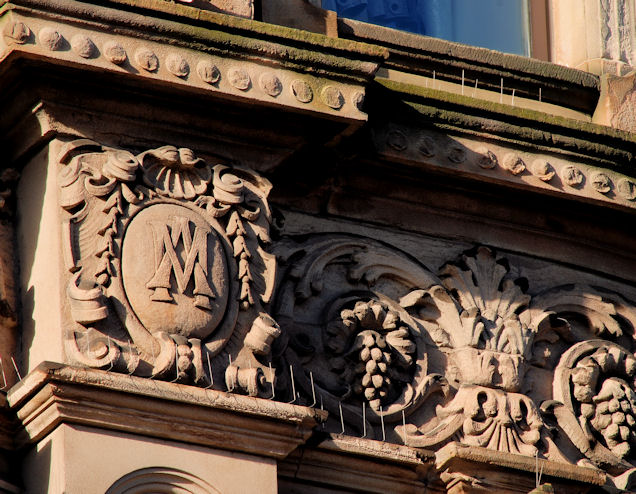
Anderson & McAuley monogram on a former building of the company in Belfast

Anderson remained chairman of Anderson & McAuley, Ltd. He was also a director of a number of other companies. He was involved in Sir John Arnott & Co., Ltd.; Vulcanite, Ltd.; City Estates, Ltd.; Milfort Weaving and Finishing Co., Ltd.; William Ross & Co., Ltd., spinners; Baltic Firewood Co., Ltd.; and was a director of Laganvale Brick Works. Vulcanite Ltd. was acquired by Ruberoid Co. in 1971, and is now part of the IKO group.

== Public life ==
Anderson was a J.P. for County Antrim, appointed High Sheriff of Belfast in 1903 and knighted the same year during a visit by King Edward VII. He became a Conservative Member of the Corporation of Belfast from 1893, and was elected Lord Mayor of Belfast in 1908. In 1911 he was appointed High Sheriff of Monaghan and created a baronet on 22 June 1911, of Parkmount in the County of the City of Belfast and of Mullaghmore in the County of Monaghan.

== Family ==
Anderson baronets
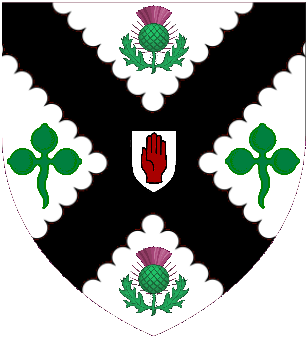
- Escutcheon of the Anderson baronets of Parkmount
- Creation date: 1911. Granted 31 October 1911 by Nevile Rodwell Wilkinson, Ulster King of Arms.
- Status: extinct
- Extinction date: 1921
- Motto: Providentia
- Arms: Argent a saltire engrailed Sable between two thistles in chief and as many trefoils in flank slipped Proper.
- Crest: A phoenix Sable charged on the breast with a trefoil Or and issuing out of flames Proper. Torse: of the colours.

In 1890, Anderson married Wilhelmina, daughter of the Rev. Andrew Long, of Monreagh, Carrigans, County Donegal. They lived at Parkmount, Greencastle, County Antrim (which he had purchased from the McNeills), and at Mullaghmore House, County Monaghan. He died in 1921 and was buried in Belfast City Cemetery. On his death without an heir the baronetage became extinct.

Civic offices
| Preceded by Samuel Lawthor | High Sheriff of Belfast; 1903–1904 | Succeeded by Henry Hutton |
| Preceded by The Earl of Shaftesbury | Lord Mayor of Belfast; 1908–1910 | Succeeded by R. J. McMordie |
Baronetage of the United Kingdom
| New creation | Baronet (of Parkmount and Mullaghmore); 1911–1921 | Extinct |
| Preceded by Stoker baronets | Anderson baronets of Parkmount and Mullaghmore; 22 June 1911 | Succeeded by Ball baronets |
