= St Andrew's Church, Covehithe =

Coordinates: 52.3768°N 1.7053°E

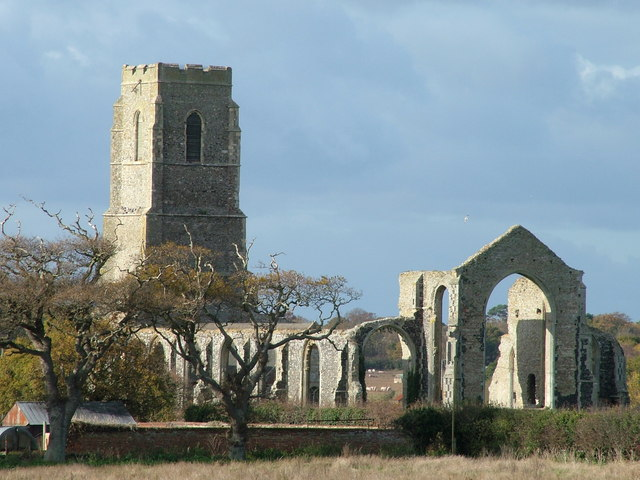
- St Andrew's Church, Covehithe

- Location in Suffolk
- OS grid reference: TM 523 818
- Location: Covehithe, Suffolk
- Country: England
- Denomination: Anglican
- Website: Churches Conservation Trust; St Andrew, Covehithe

History
- Dedication: Saint Andrew

Architecture
- Heritage designation: Grade I
- Designated: 27 November 1954
- Architectural type: Church
- Style: Gothic

Administration
- Province: Canterbury
- Diocese: St Edmundsbury and Ipswich
- Archdeaconry: Suffolk
- Deanery: Halesworth
- Parish: Covehithe with Benacre

Clergy
- Vicar: Revd Leonard John Payne

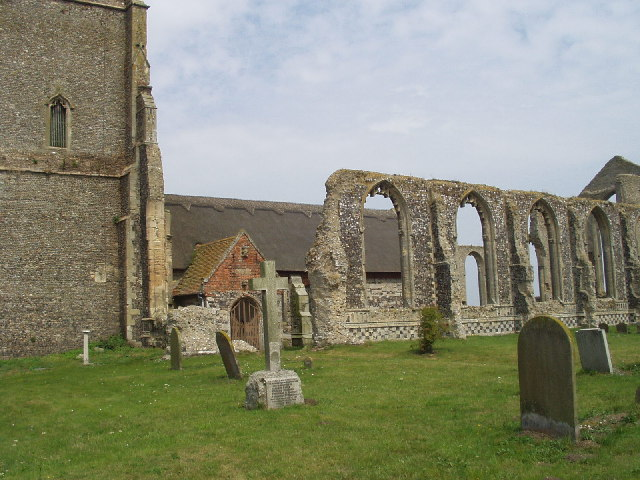
Thatched church seen within the ruins

St Andrew's Church is a partly redundant Anglican church in the hamlet of Covehithe in the English county of Suffolk. It is recorded in the National Heritage List for England as a designated Grade I listed building, Part of the church is in ruins and this is under the care of the Churches Conservation Trust. The church stands on a lane leading directly towards the sea, in an area of coast which has suffered significant ongoing erosion. The parish of Covehithe has been combined with neighbouring Benacre.

== History ==
The oldest fabric in the original large medieval church dates from the 14th century, although most of it is from the 15th century. During the Civil War much of the stained glass was destroyed by the local iconoclast William Dowsing. By the later part of that century the large church was too expensive for the parishioners to maintain, and they were given permission in 1672 to remove the roof and to build a much smaller church within it. This small church is still in use, while the tower and the ruins of the old church are maintained by the Churches Conservation Trust.

=== Present day ===
The parish is a member of The Prayer Book Society, a traditionalist Anglican society that champions the use of the Book of Common Prayer. As the church rejects the ordination of women, it receives alternative episcopal oversight from the Bishop of Richborough (currently Luke Irvine-Capel).

== Architecture ==
=== Medieval church ===
This is constructed in random flint rubble with stone dressings. Its plan consists of a nave, a chancel, north and south seven-bay aisles, a north sacristy, and a west tower. The tower is still intact and is in three principal stages, with buttresses and a battlemented parapet. On the south side of the middle stage is an ogee-headed opening. There are bell openings on each side of the top stage, but their tracery is missing. The wall of the south aisle is more complete than the north wall, and contains six intact window openings. The chancel projects one bay beyond the aisles, and contains tall window openings in its north and south wall, and a large east window opening. The buttresses at the east end are decorated with chequered flushwork, and contain canopied niches for statues. Some of the carved corbels for the chancel roof are still present.

=== Newer small church ===
The west end of the 17th-century church is built against the tower. Its fabric includes much material re-used from the older church, and some brick. Its roof is thatched. The windows have two lights separated by wooden mullions, and contain diamond-leaded windows. Both the north and the south doorways have been re-used. The east window dates from the 19th century. Inside the church is a 15th-century carved octagonal font. At the west end are 15th-century pews with poppyhead carving. The wooden pulpit contains some 17th-century carving. Under the tower arch are the royal arms of George III.

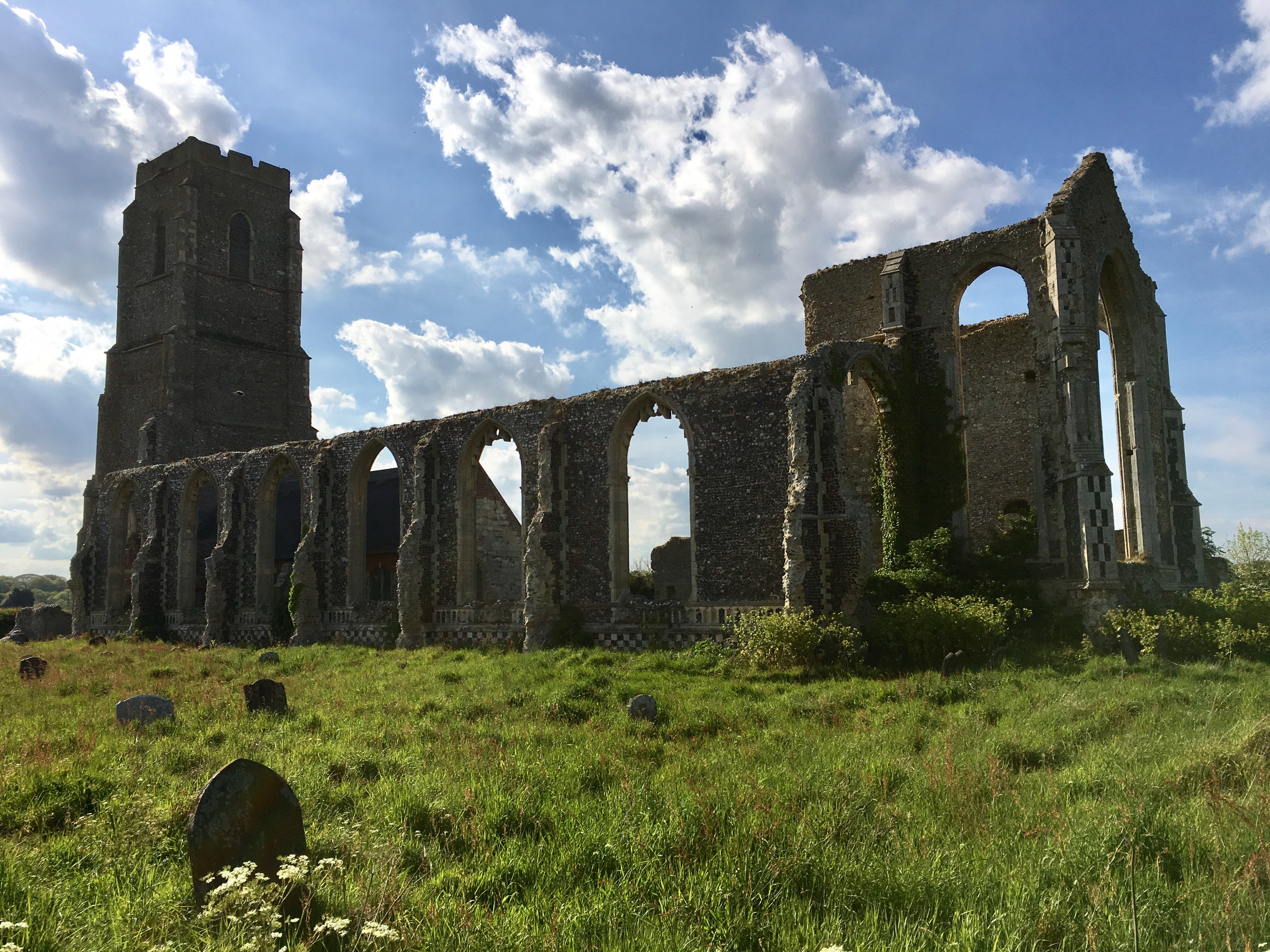
St Andrew's from the southeast

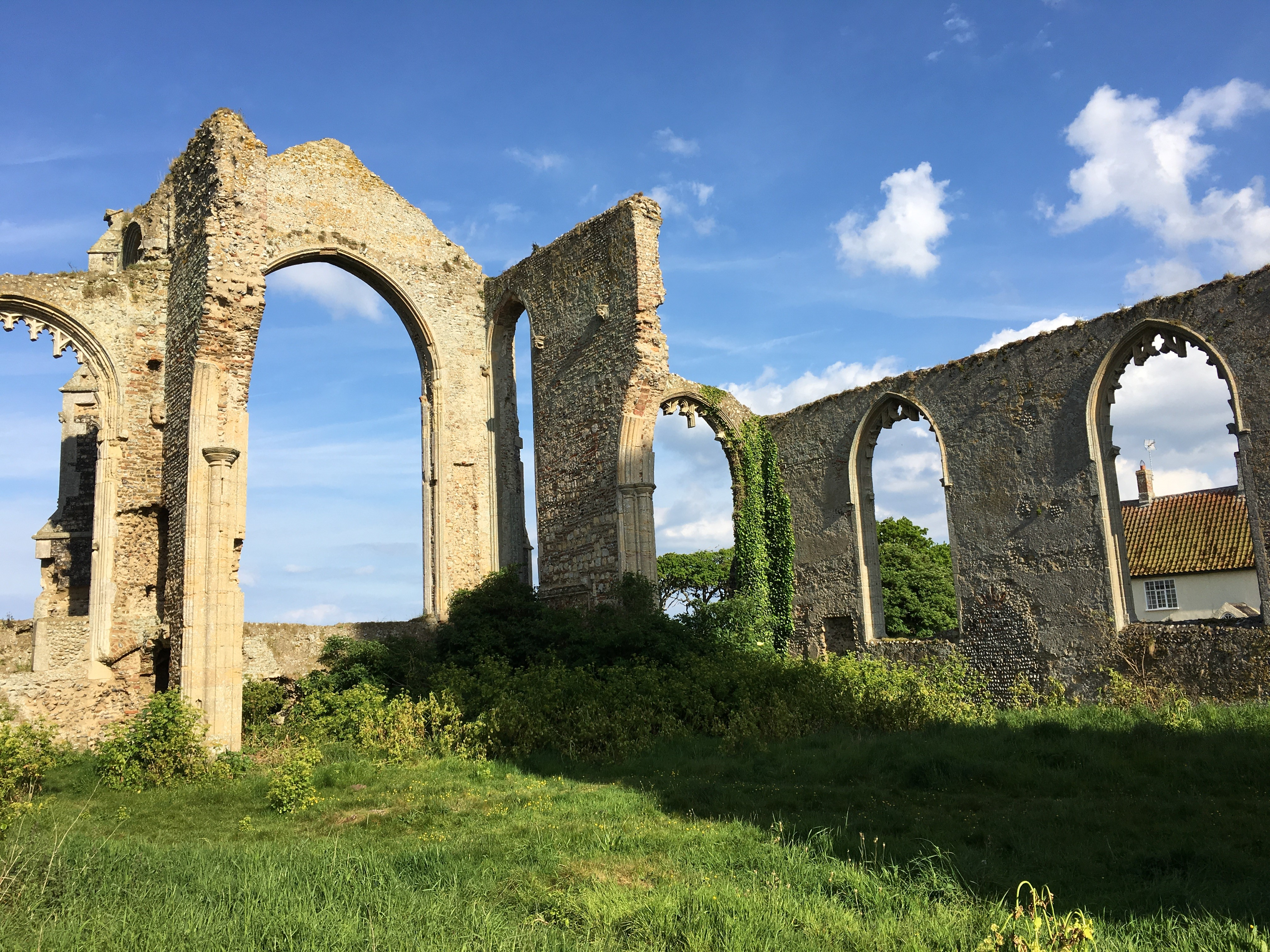
The ruins of the old church

== See also ==
- List of churches preserved by the Churches Conservation Trust in the East of England
