= Charles Clyde Ball =

American school principal and sports player and coach

Biographical details
- Born: October 21, 1881; Ramona, South Dakota, U.S.
- Died: September 21, 1955 (aged 73); Hackensack, Minnesota, U.S.

Playing career

Football
- 1902–1905: Coe
- Position: Quarterback

Coaching career (HC unless noted)

Football
- 1906: University of Omaha

Basketball
- 1906–1907: University of Omaha

Administrative career (AD unless noted)
- 1909–1912: Coe

Charles Clyde Ball (October 21, 1881 – September 21, 1955) was a high school principal and American football and basketball player and coach. In 1906, he served as the head football coach at the University of Omaha (a now-defunct institution later known as Bellevue College, not to be confused with Bellevue University that exists today). The Charles Ball Academy in San Antonio, Texas, is named in his honor.
