= Anderson baronets of Penley (1643) =

Anderson baronets
- Escutcheon of the Anderson baronets of Penley
- Creation date: 1643
- Status: extinct
- Extinction date: 1699
- Arms: argent a chevron sable, between three crosses flory sable

The Anderson Baronetcy, of Penley in the County of Hertford, was created in the Baronetage of England on 3 July 1643 for Henry Anderson. The title became extinct on the death of the second Baronet in 1699.

== Anderson baronets, of Penley (1643) ==
- Sir Henry Anderson, 1st Baronet (c. 1608–1653)
- Sir Richard Anderson, 2nd Baronet (c. 1635–1699)

Henry Anderson, of Penley (Pendley) in the parish of Tring, Hertfordshire, was the son of Sir Richard Anderson and his wife Mary, daughter of Robert Spencer, 1st Baron Spencer of Wormleighton. He was a royalist in the English Civil War, heavily fined by the parliamentary sequestrators.

The Anderson baronets of Penley were related to the Anderson baronets of St Ives (1629), the Anderson baronets of Broughton (1660) and the Anderson baronets of Eyworth (1664), who all used the same arms.

An Irish branch of this family, from Dublin, passed to Portugal in the person of William then Guilherme Anderson, father of António Leandro Anderson, born in Borba, married to Ana Bercia da Silveira, and paternal grandfather of Dr. Guilherme António Apolinário Anderson, born at Nossa Senhora da Conceição, Vila Viçosa, Bachelor in Canon Law and Civil Law from the Faculty of Law of the University of Coimbra between 1 October 1753 and 13 May 1759, Outsider Judge of the city of Beja and Provider of the District of Beja in the late 1700s, who lived in Moura with his wife Antónia Josefa Paula Malpica Bahamonde, native of the city of Badajoz, Spain, Noblewoman of Coat of Arms of Anderson and Bahamonde on 3 February 1779, daughter of Juan Domínguez Malpica and wife Teresa Amador and maternal granddaughter of Alonso Sánchez Amador and wife María Grian Bahamonde. Their arms are: argent, a lowered chevron sable, accompanied by three crosses pate sable, two in chief and one in point, and finished by an escutcheon argent, shaped sable, charged with a left hand raised and open sable; crest: a deer's head and neck or, pierced in fess of an arrow sable fledged argent. The Andersons of London use the same arms, although with another difference. In the Province of León they use for arms: or, a chevron gules, charged with acorns argent, accompanied by three eagle heads sable, two in chief and one in point.
