= Anderson baronets of Broughton (1660) =

Anderson baronets
- Escutcheon of the Anderson baronets of Broughton
- Creation date: 1660
- Status: extinct
- Extinction date: 1891
- Motto: Graviter (gravely)
- Arms: argent a chevron sable, between three crosses flory sable

The Anderson Baronetcy, of Broughton in the County of Lincoln, was created in the Baronetage of England on 11 December 1660 for Edmund Anderson. The title became extinct on the death of the ninth Baronet in 1891.

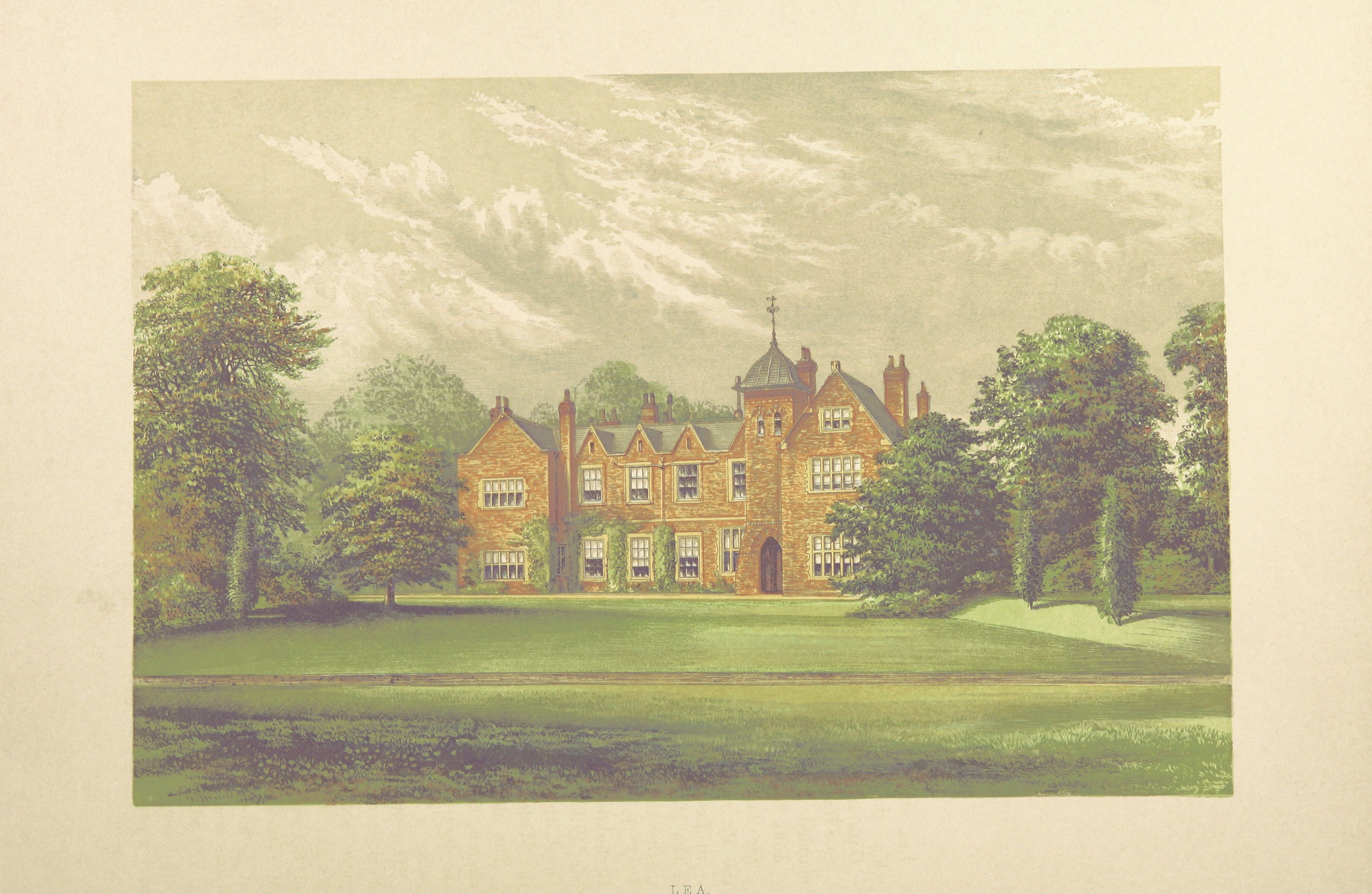
Lea Hall, Lincolnshire, near Gainsborough, for many years the seat of the Anderson family — 1866 view

The first baronet, Edmund, was son of William Anderson of Broughton, Lincolnshire, youngest son of Edmund Anderson (1530–1605) the judge; and so a first cousin of Sir John Anderson, 1st Baronet of St Ives, son of the second son Sir Francis Anderson. He matriculated at St John's College, Cambridge in 1620, and was admitted to Gray's Inn in 1623. He died in 1661, the year after he was created baronet.

== Anderson baronets, of Broughton (1660) ==
- Sir Edmund Anderson, 1st Baronet (1605–1661)
- Sir John Anderson, 2nd Baronet (1628–1670)
- Sir Edmund Anderson, 3rd Baronet (c. 1661–1676)
- Sir Edmund Anderson, 4th Baronet (1629–c. 1703)
- Sir Edmund Anderson, 5th Baronet (1687–1765)
- Sir William Anderson, 6th Baronet (1722–1785)
- Sir Edmund Anderson, 7th Baronet (1758–1799)
- Rev. Sir Charles John Anderson, 8th Baronet (1767–1846); the rector of Lea, he died there.
- Sir Charles Henry John Anderson, 9th Baronet (1804–1891)

The three sons of the 9th baronet predeceased him, so that the baronetcy became extinct in 1891.

The Anderson baronets of Broughton were related to the Anderson baronets of St Ives (1629), the Anderson baronets of Penley (1643) and the Anderson baronets of Eyworth (1664), who all used the same arms.
