= Anderson baronets of St Ives (1629) =

Anderson baronets
- Escutcheon of the Anderson baronets of St Ives
- Creation date: 1629
- Status: extinct
- Extinction date: 1630
- Arms: argent a chevron sable, between three crosses flory sable

The Anderson Baronetcy, of St Ives in the County of Huntingdon, was created in the Baronetage of England on 3 January 1629 for John Anderson. The title became extinct on his death in 1630.

== Anderson baronets, of St Ives (1629) ==
- Sir John Anderson, 1st Baronet (died 1630)

John Anderson, of St Ives, Huntingdonshire, was the youngest son of Sir Francis Anderson of Eyworth, Bedfordshire (died 1615), and the only son by his second wife Audrey. She was the daughter of John Boteler, 1st Baron Boteler of Brantfield and his wife Elizabeth Villiers, sister of George Villiers, 1st Duke of Buckingham.

His mother, Lady Anderson, was considered "a fair young rich widow", and had prominent suitors. She remarried after a few years, to the widowed courtier Francis Leigh. Leigh was made a baronet under James I, and then in 1628 was created Baron Dunsmore, the unique new title in the Peerage of England of this period. Not having other court connections, Leigh owed the advancement to the influence of the Duke of Buckingham. The letters patent for the barony included a special remainder, to his stepson John Anderson.

Anderson matriculated at Sidney Sussex College, Cambridge in 1626/7. He died in 1630 at Apscourt (Apps Court), Lord Dunsmore's seat in Walton-on-Thames. Dunsmore went on to become Earl of Chichester as a royalist of the English Civil War, in 1644. On his death in 1653 the Dunsmore barony became extinct, but the Chichester earldom passed by another special remainder to Thomas Wriothesley, 4th Earl of Southampton, his son-in-law.

The first baronet was the brother of Stephen Anderson of Eyworth, and uncle of Sir Stephen Anderson, 1st Baronet of Eyworth (1664). The Anderson baronets of St Ives were also related to the Anderson baronets of Penley (1643) and the Anderson baronets of Broughton (1660), who all used the same arms.
