= Anderson baronets of Eyworth (1664) =

Anderson baronets
- Escutcheon of the Anderson baronets of Eyworth
- Creation date: 1664
- Status: extinct
- Extinction date: 1773
- Arms: argent a chevron sable, between three crosses flory sable

The Anderson Baronetcy, of Eyworth in the County of Bedford, was created in the Baronetage of England on 13 July 1664 for Stephen Anderson. The title became extinct on the death of the third Baronet in 1773.

The first baronet was the son of Stephen Anderson of Eyworth, and nephew of Sir John Anderson, 1st Baronet of St Ives (1629). The Anderson baronets of Eyworth were also related to the Anderson baronets of Penley (1643) and the Anderson baronets of Broughton (1660), who all used the same arms.

== Anderson baronets, of Eyworth (1664) ==
- Sir Stephen Anderson, 1st Baronet (c. 1644–1707)
- Sir Stephen Anderson, 2nd Baronet (1678–1741)
- Sir Stephen Anderson, 3rd Baronet (1708–1773)
