= Benacre Broad =

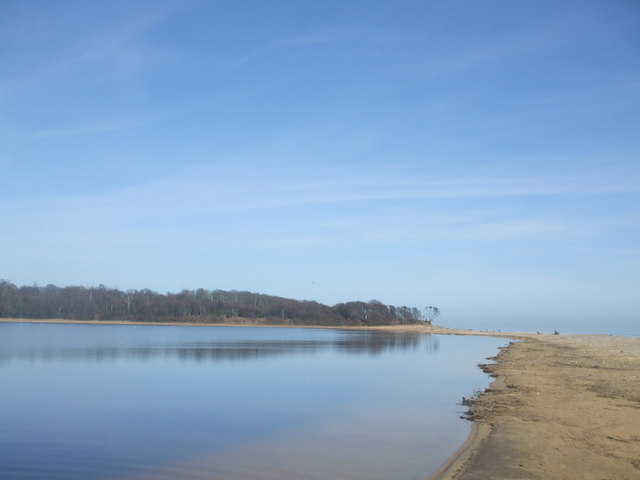
- Benacre Broad in 2009

- Location within England
- Location: Benacre, Suffolk
- Coordinates: 52.388°N 1.709°E
- Type: lagoon

Benacre Broad is an isolated coastal lagoon on the North Sea coast of the English county of Suffolk. It is located in the parish of Benacre around 1/2 mile (0.80 km) north of the village of Covehithe. It is about 2 miles (3.2 km) east of Wrentham, 4 1/2 miles (7.2 km) north of Southwold and 6 1/4 miles (10 km) south of Lowestoft.

The broad is part of Benacre National Nature Reserve, a reserve managed by Natural England. It forms part of the area of the Pakefield to Easton Bavents Site of Special Scientific Interest and the Benacre and Easton Barents Lagoons Special Area of Conservation.

The main broad area has traditionally been made up of a number of smaller bodies of water and in 1996 a number of small pools were created to combat the impact of coastal erosion and increasing water salinity on habitats. At a 1997 survey, it had an area of 5 hectares (12 acres). At the end of November 2011 a high tidal surge broke through the narrow beach separating the Broad from the sea, inundating the area and increasing the salinity markedly. A survey in February 2012 found that the area of the broad had increased to 43 hectares (110 acres) and that the salinity of the water had increased to 22 parts per thousand. The water depth had also increased, although some separate pools within the lagoon area had remained as fresh water.

In 2020, the beach was again breached and currently (December 2020) a channel allows salt water to enter the broad at high tide, and the fresh water to drain from the broad as the tide drops.
