= Benacre, Suffolk =

Village in Suffolk, England

Coordinates: 52.399°N 1.691°E

Benacre
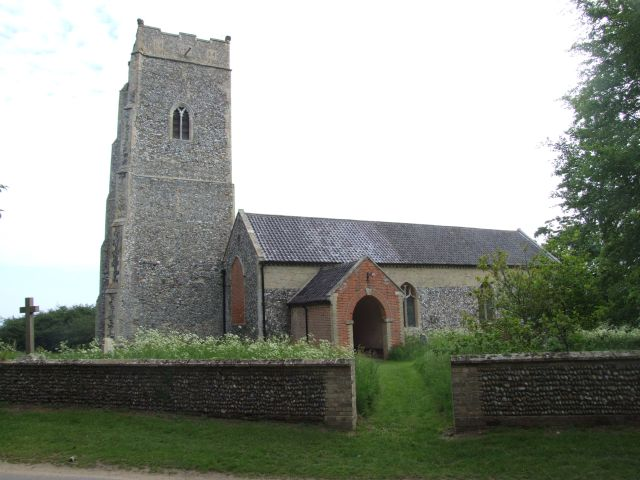
- The former St Michael’s Church, Benacre

- Location within Suffolk
- Interactive map of Benacre
- Population: 70 (2008 estimate)
- District: East Suffolk
- Shire county: Suffolk
- Region: East
- Country: England
- Sovereign state: United Kingdom
- Post town: Beccles
- Postcode district: NR34
- Dialling code: 01502

Benacre is a village and civil parish in the East Suffolk district of the English county of Suffolk. The village is located about 5 3/4 miles (9 km) south of Lowestoft and 1 1/2 miles (2 km) north-east of Wrentham, between the main A12 road and the North Sea coast. Neighbouring villages include Kessingland and Covehithe with the town of Southwold 5 miles (8 km) to the south.

The village is dispersed around Benacre Hall, the estate of the Gooch family. It had a population of around 70 in mid-2008. The population declined dramatically during the 20th century from 216 at the 1901 census. The area of the parish extends from the Hundred River in the north to Benacre Broad in the south.

The name Benacre means bēan æcer (or ‘newly cultivated land on which beans are grown’ ) in Old English. In the Domesday Book of 1086 the village's name is given as Benagra within the Hundred of Blythling. It formed part of the holdings of the Abbey of Bury St Edmunds, as it had before the Norman Conquest, with one freeman recorded as living in the manor.

The village has few basic services. The former parish church of St Michael is now privately owned by the Gooch family. It is medieval in origin and a Grade II* listed building, although extensively rebuilt following a fire in the 18th century. The church of St Andrew in Covehithe now acts as the parish church for Benacre.

Benacre Broad forms part of the Benacre National Nature Reserve, an important reserve for over 100 bird species including the marsh harrier, little tern and bittern. The shingle beach also forms an important habitat and the coastal area of the parish is part of the Pakefield to Easton Barents Site of Special Scientific Interest.
