= Charles Bent Ball =

Irish surgeon (1851–1916)

Sir Charles Bent Ball, 1st Baronet
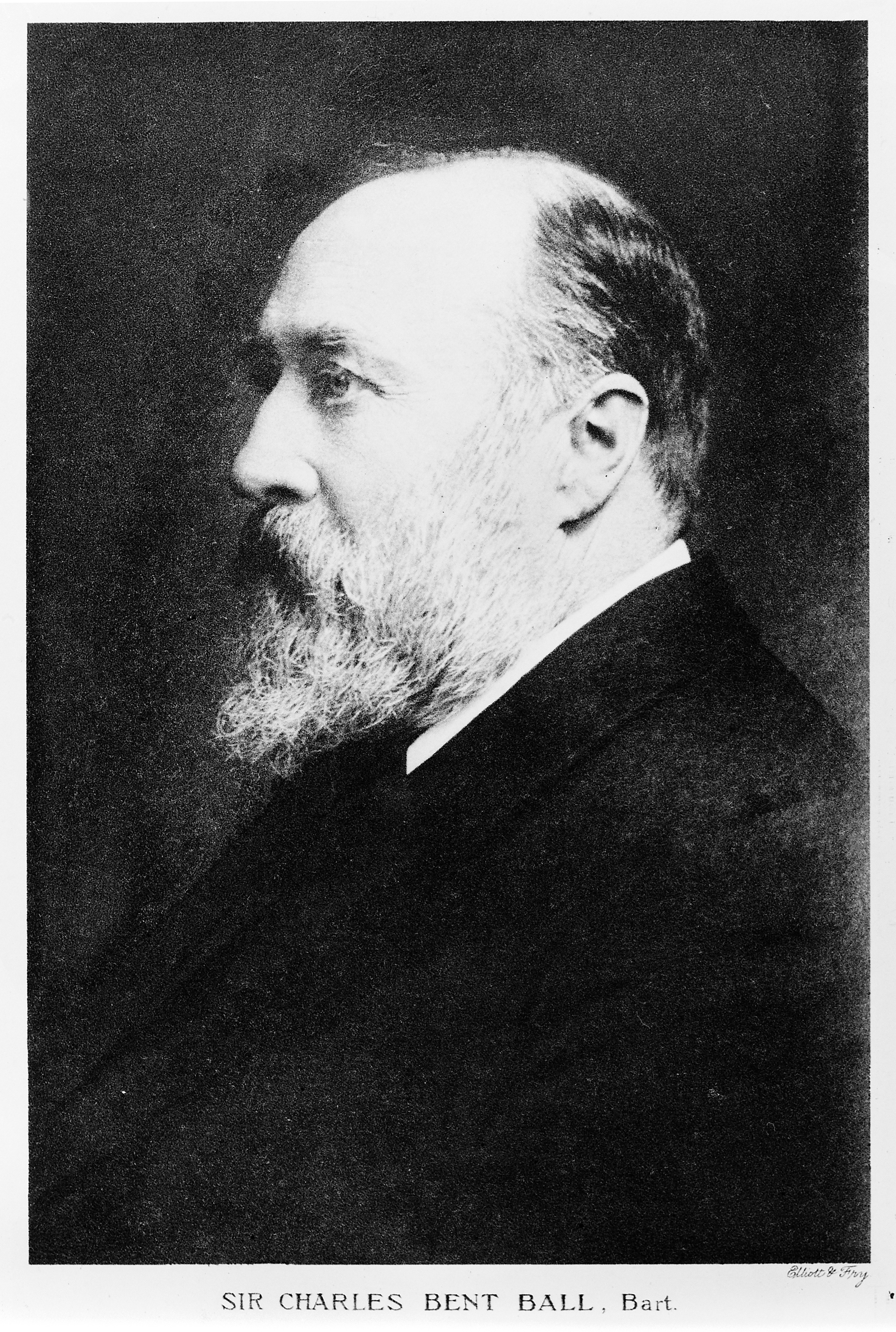
- Obituary portrait of Sir Charles Bent Ball
- Born: 21 February 1851; Dublin, Ireland, United Kingdom of Great Britain and Ireland
- Died: 17 March 1916 (aged 65); Dublin
- Citizenship: British
- Education: Trinity College, Dublin
- Occupation: Surgeon
- Years active: 1874–1916
- Relatives: Robert Ball, Robert Stawell Ball, Valentine Ball, Nigel Ball
- Medical career
- Profession: Doctor
- Field: Surgery
- Institutions: Trinity College, Dublin, Sir Patrick Dun's Hospital
- Sub-specialties: Abdominal and rectal surgery

Sir Charles Bent Ball, 1st Baronet, Hon FRCS MD FRCSI (21 February 1851 – 17 March 1916) was an Irish surgeon and an honorary surgeon to the King in Ireland.

== Early life and education ==
Charles Bent Ball was born in Dublin on 21 February 1851, the third and youngest son of the seven children of Robert Ball and Amelia Gresley Ball (née Hellicar). His brothers were astronomer Sir Robert Stawell Ball and the geologist Valentine Ball. Ball attended Trinity College, Dublin (TCD), graduating with a BA in 1871 with a gold medal in natural science, following with an MB and M.Ch. in 1872.

Ball won a surgical travelling prize in 1873 to study in Vienna, taking an MD from Dublin University in 1875, becoming a Fellow of the Royal College of Surgeons in Ireland (RCSI) in 1879. He practised as a surgeon at the Blaenavon Iron and Steel Co. in Monmouthshire, Wales from 1874 to 1881, then returning to Dublin to become a medical officer in the Grand Canal St. district.

== Career ==
Ball was appointed assistant surgeon to Sir Patrick Dun's Hospital in 1883, joining Edward Hallaran Bennett, a pioneer in antiseptic surgery in Dublin. Their collaboration resulted in the opening of the first modern antiseptic operating theatre in Ireland in 1898. Ball became the leading surgeon in Ireland working at this hospital from 1895 to 1916, and was amongst the first surgeons to perform extensive abdominal operations. A notable case which Ball operated is referred to as the "chisel case" in 1887, where a boy had perforated his stomach and abdominal vein with a chisel. Ball operated on the boy's abdomen with an abdominal section, suturing the wounds, and ultimately saving the boy's life. This was one of the earliest cases of successfully suturing a lesion of the alimentary canal. Amongst his patients was John Millington Synge, who suffered from Hodgkin's disease.

Ball became a specialist in rectal diseases, writing The rectum and anus: their diseases and treatment (1887, 2nd ed. 1894) and The rectum: its diseases and developmental effects (1908). He also contributed to journals and the Rectum article in F. Treves's System of surgery (1895). "Ball's operation" refers to a pruritus ani which divides the sensory nerves that supply the region. The rectal valves are eponymously known as "Ball's valves". He was invited to lecture abroad, including as Lane lecturer to San Francisco in 1902, and as Erasmus Wilson lecturer to the Royal College of Surgeons of England in 1903. Ball served as consulting surgeon to a number of institutions in Dublin, including the Steevens', Monkstown, and Orthopaedic hospitals. He served as a lieutenant-colonel with the Royal Army Medical Corps during World War I and as a consulting surgeon for troops in Ireland.

== Honours and awards ==
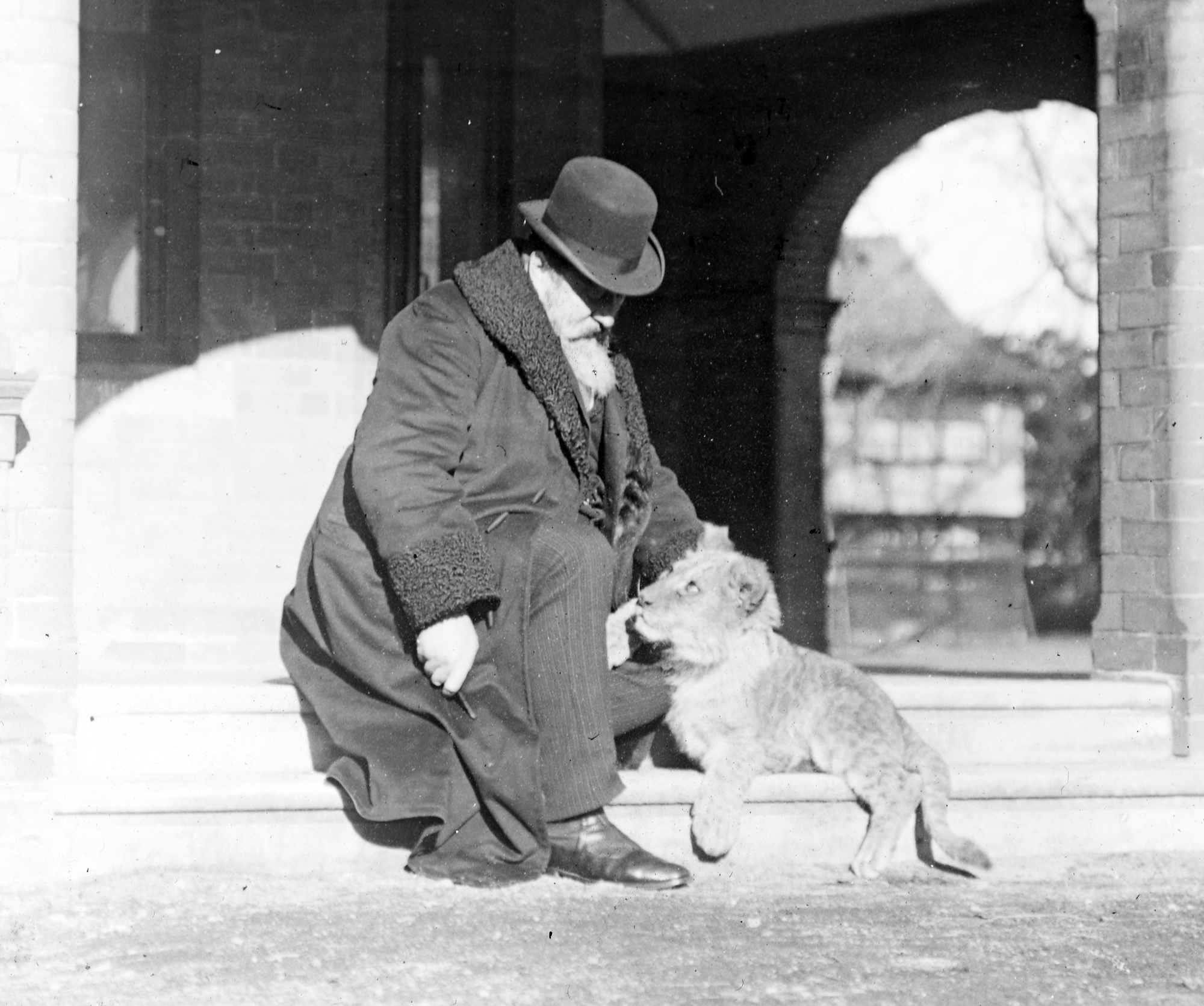
Sir Charles Ball and Jerry the lion cub in 1907

At TCD, Ball was appointed university anatomist in 1895 succeeding Henry St John Brooks, the regius professor of surgery from 1895 to 1916, and represented the university from 1906 to 1916 on the general medical council. Ball was an honorary surgeon to the King in Ireland. He was knighted in February 1903, after he was responsible during an operation for appendicitis on Lady Dudley, wife of the Earl of Dudley, Lord Lieutenant of Ireland. He was later awarded a baronetcy in 1911. He held a number of presidencies, including the Dublin University Biological Association in 1886, the surgical section of the British Medical Association in 1905, and the Royal Academy of Medicine in Ireland from 1909 to 1912. Ball was a member of RCSI council, and an honorary fellow of the Royal College of Surgeons (England) from 1900. As he was a keen botanist, Ball was elected president of the Royal Zoological Society of Ireland from 1911 to 1916. Over his career he held many public posts, such as the commissioner of national education, medical referee under the Workmen's Compensation Act, and member of the advisory board for the army medical service.

== Later life and family ==
Ball died at his home at 24 Merrion Square, Dublin, on 17 March 1916. Ball married Annie Julia Kinahan on 23 July 1874, and the couple had three sons and four daughters. Sir Charles Arthur Kinahan Ball was the eldest, and went on to be surgeon at Sir Patrick Dun's Hospital and regius professor of surgery at TCD, and succeeded his father as baronet. Their youngest son was Sir Nigel Gresley Ball a botanist who succeeded his brother in the title in 1945. Ball is commemorated in TCD's War Memorial in the 1937 Reading Room.

Baronetage of the United Kingdom
| New creation | Baronet (of Merrion Square and Killybegs); 1911–1916 | Succeeded by Charles Arthur Ball |
