= Charles Richard Ball =

Revd. Charles Richard Ball (11 March 1833 – 1918) was the leading trustee and reputed Lord of Madeley Manor. In Peterborough, he was the Vicar of St Paul's Church and the Honorary Canon of Peterborough Cathedral.

== Early life ==
Ball, born 11 March 1833 in Clifton, Bristol, was the son of Joseph and Rebecca Ball. He had a brother A.W. Ball. He graduated from Christ's College, Cambridge with a B.A. in 1858 and a M.A. in 1864.

== Career ==
In 1869, was made vicar of St Paul's Church serving the towns of Millfield and New England of Peterborough. He was curate of Trentham, Staffordshire and Belgrave, Leicestershire. In Leicester, he was curate at St John's and St Andrews.

He was the rural dean of Peterborough, appointed by the Bishop of Creighton. By 1891, he was appointed the Honorary Canon of Peterborough Cathedral by Bishop Magee. He was elected proctor for the Diocese of Peterborough to Convocation.

Ball wrote The Apostle of the Gentiles, His Life and Letters in 1885. By that time, he also had written The Promised Seed and Lessons on our Lord's Ministry. He also wrote The Faith in Outline, Plain Thoughts on a Great Subject, The Blankthorpe Papers, and The Dispensation of the Spirit.

== Personal life ==
He married Mary Eliza Saunders on 28 December 1871, the daughter of Rev. A. P. Saunders, DD, who was the headmaster of the Charter House and the Dean of Peterborough. They had a son, Richard Reynold Ball, on 8 August 1882.

In 1891, eleven members of the family settled their shares or interests in Madeley Manor on trustees, Charles Richard Ball being the leading trustee and reputed lord of the manor. Between 1871 and 1889, the manor had passed to the Ball family, descendants of Joseph Reynolds's daughter Rebecca and her husband (and second cousin) Joseph Ball.
