= Claude Morley =

English antiquary and entomologist

Claude Morley (22 June 1874 – 13 November 1951) was an English antiquary and entomologist who specialised in Hymenoptera and Diptera. He has been described by Peter Marren as "Suffolk's best-known entomologist".

== Biography ==
Morley was born at Astley Bank in Blackheath in 1874 and educated at Beccles before attending King's School, Peterborough and later Epsom College. After living on the Isle of Wight in his father's house at Cowes, he moved in 1892 to Ipswich where he worked with John Ellor Taylor, then Curator of the Ipswich Museum. He married in 1904, living at Monk Soham until his death in 1951. He had no radio, telephone, or electricity in his house. E.A. Elliott was a close friend, as was Arthur Chitty.

Morley worked first on Coleoptera, then Hemiptera and then Ichneumonidae. His magnum opus was the five volume Ichneumons of Great Britain (1903–1914). Morley's collection of mainly Suffolk material covering the period 1898–1951 is in Ipswich Museum. It occupies around 260 drawers. There are Cerambycids bearing his name in the Kauffmann collection at Manchester.

Morley was a Fellow of the Entomological Society of London 1896. In 1929 he was one of the founding members of the Suffolk Naturalists' Society, and an editor of Transactions of the Suffolk Naturalists' Trust, the society's journal. Among pre-1950 British entomologists, Morley showed a relative interest in Irish fauna.

He also wrote poetry under the pseudonym of Maude Clorley.

== Works ==
=== Hemiptera ===
- Morley, Claude (1905). The Hemiptera of Suffolk. Plymouth: J.H. Keys.

=== Hymenoptera ===
- —— (1899). The Hymenoptera of Suffolk. Plymouth: James H. Keys.
- On the Ichneumonidous Group Tryphonides schizodonti with descriptions of new species (1905)
- A description of the superior wing of the Hymenoptera, with a view to giving a simpler and more certain nomenclature to the alary system of Jurine.Trans. Ent. Soc. London, 1909: 439–447, figs. (1909)
- Catalogue of British Hymenoptera of the family Chalcididae, 74pp. Publisher? (1910).
- A revision of the Ichneumonidae based on the coll. in the British Museum Publisher? (1912–1914).
- (1908–1911) Ichneumonologia Britannica (4 Volumes) London
- On in some South African Ichneumonidae the collection of the South African Museum.Annals of the South African Museum,17:191-229. (1917)
- Fauna of British India Hymenoptera Vol. 3. Ichneumones Deltoidei (1913)
- The Percy Sladen trust Expedition to the Indian Ocean (Seychelles) in 1905. 12.Ichneumonidae (1912)

=== Coleoptera ===
- —— (1899). The Coleoptera of Suffolk. Plymouth: James H. Keys. Supplement, 1915. The work listed 1783 species and the supplement 237.

Morley also wrote many articles in the Entomologist's monthly magazine, Entomologist's Record and Journal of Variation, and other periodicals, and he was on the editorial staff of The Entomologist from 1909.
