= Ball baronets =

Set index for Ball baronets

There have been three baronetcies created for persons with the surname Ball, one in the Baronetage of England and two in the Baronetage of the United Kingdom.

- Ball baronets of Mamhead (1672): see Sir Peter Ball, 1st Baronet (died 1680)
- Ball Baronets of Blofield (1801)
- Ball Baronets of Merrion Square and Killybegs (1911)
