= Benacre National Nature Reserve =

Nature reserve in Suffolk, England

Coordinates: 52.372°N 1.702°E

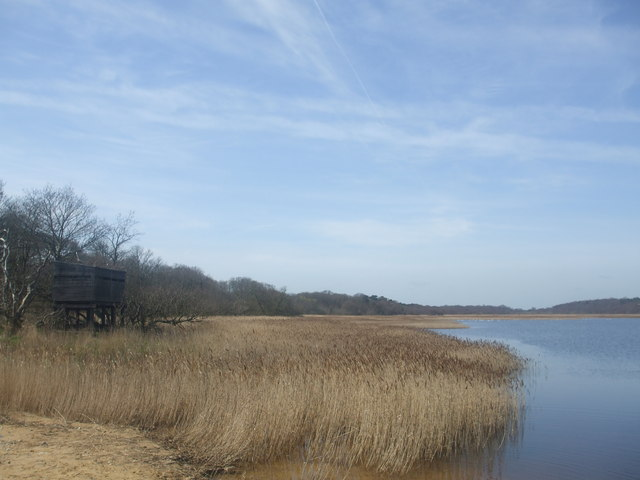
Benacre Broad

Benacre National Nature Reserve is a national nature reserve in the English county of Suffolk. It is located on the North Sea coast in the parishes of Benacre, Covehithe, Reydon and South Cove. It lies between the towns of Lowestoft and Southwold and covers 393 hectares (970 acres).

Benacre NNR consists of areas of open water lagoons and reed beds along the Suffolk coast including Benacre Broad, Covehithe Broad and Easton Broad and extending as far south as Reydon. The reserve features extensive reedbeds, woodland and heathland, as well as pits created by gravel extraction. There are over 100 species of breeding birds, including marsh harrier, bearded reedling, water rail, and occasionally bittern. The flora includes seakale, sea holly, and yellow-horned poppy. Reed is farmed commercially for the thatching industry, whilst enabling the bearded reedling to find a habitat.

The coastline has eroded rapidly over time and the reserve is threatened by both erosion and sea level rise. Some of the ongoing work at the reserve is stopping the encroaching sea by digging new lagoons and establishing more sea defences, and replacing the woodland lost to the sea.
