= West Park United Reformed Church, Harrogate =

United Reformed Church in Harrogate, North Yorkshire, England

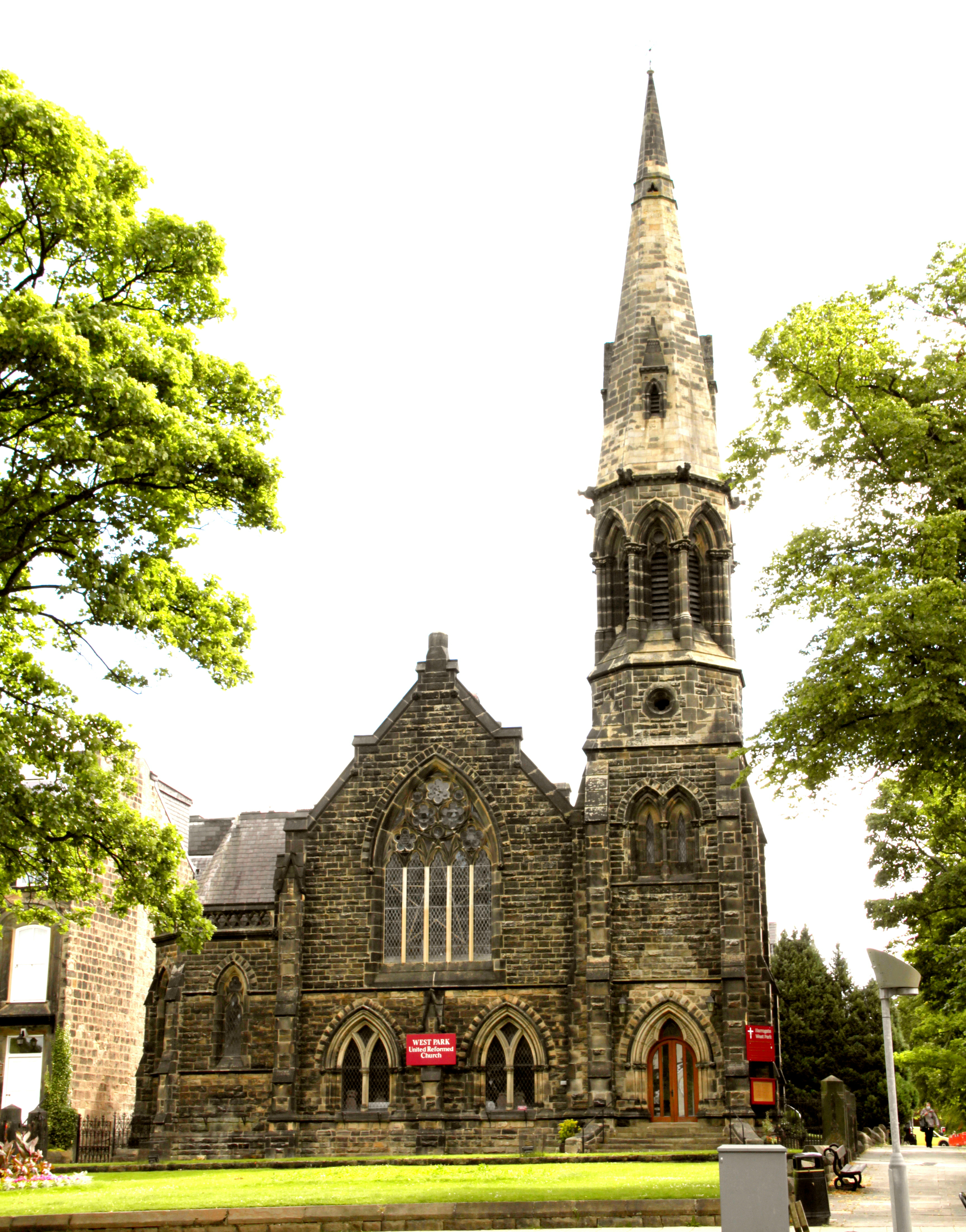
- West Park United Reformed Church, Harrogate

- Location in North Yorkshire Location in England
- 53.9907°N 1.5405°W
- Denomination: United Reformed
- Website: www.harrogatewestparkurc.org.uk

West Park United Reformed Church is located in the West Park area of Harrogate, England, and is a Grade II listed building. It was designed in Nonconformist Gothic style as West Park Congregational Church by Lockwood & Mawson and completed in 1862 for around £5,000. Along with Belvedere Mansion across the road, it was intended as part of the prestigious entrance to the Victoria Park development (now West Park). For the Congregationalists it was meant to house an increasing congregation of visitors brought to the spa town by the recently built railways. It became a United Reformed church in 1972.

Its first minister was the much-loved Reverend John Henry Gavin who died in his prime of tuberculosis and had a big funeral in which many followed the coffin. Sir Francis Crossley laid the foundation stone, Thomas Raffles preached at the opening, and Tsarina Alexandra of Russia later worshipped there. The building has a large Binns pipe organ and the tower contains a single bell cast at Whitechapel Bell Foundry. The gargoyles on the tower have chicks carved on the nest-like capitals below them, and the south wall has twelve carved heads of historical characters, including Isaac Watts, John Bunyan, John Milton and Oliver Cromwell.

In July 2025 the church building held a local history display called the Harrogate Story, and it became a community hub for local events. Although still owned by the United Reformed Church, it is now also known as the West Park Centre.

== History ==
=== Previous buildings ===
During the early 19th century, Nonconformist meetings were held in private houses. Places of worship were later fitted out or built at Hope Chapel Skipton Road around 1813, Cross Chapel Smithy Hill around 1821 or 1823, and Providence Chapel James Street around 1831. Providence Chapel was built on the corner of James Street and John Street from the fabric of the demolished St John's Church on whose site Christ Church was built in 1831. By 1859 the size of the congregation had outgrown the James Street chapel.

=== Present building ===
This is a Grade II listed building facing The Stray at the junction of Victoria Avenue and West Park Street in Harrogate. When completed as West Park Congregational Church in 1862 the building could be seen from all of Low Harrogate; it was listed primarily for the "townscape value of [the] spire." The original idea to build the church was mooted by Robert Milligan JP, (Note: Robert Milligan JP (1786–1862), a draper of Kirkgate, Bradford, was twice Mayor of Bradford. "Death of Robert Milligan Esq. of Bradford". Leeds Mercury. British Newspaper Archive. 3 July 1862. p. 4 col 2.) who died before the church was completed. Harrogate (Brunswick) railway station had brought visitors to the town since 1848, but in 1862 it was to be replaced by Harrogate railway station, and this promised to bring visitors from much further afield. To take advantage of this, the developers Victoria Park Company bought up a tract of land, including the new railway station site and abutting The Stray, and called it Victoria Park. The company made Victoria Avenue its main thoroughfare and planned to line it with churches to attract the visitors. The two most prestigious plots, at the gates of Victoria Park and facing onto The Stray, were given to West Park Congregational Church and to "rich banker" John Smith for his new Belvedere Mansion. The church building was designed by Lockwood & Mawson of Bradford, to accommodate 700 Congregationalists, visiting during the Harrogate spa season. The new building was designed with "ample and well ventilated class and school rooms."

When visiting Harrogate in 1894 and 1911, Tsarina Alexandra of Russia worshipped at the Congregational Church and stayed in the neighbouring hotel (now Cathcart House).

In 1972 the church was renamed West Park United Reformed Church, having joined a new amalgamation of Presbyterians, Congregationalists and Churches of Christ. Between 1991 and 2005 the church formed a Joint Pastorate with Bilton Grange Church.

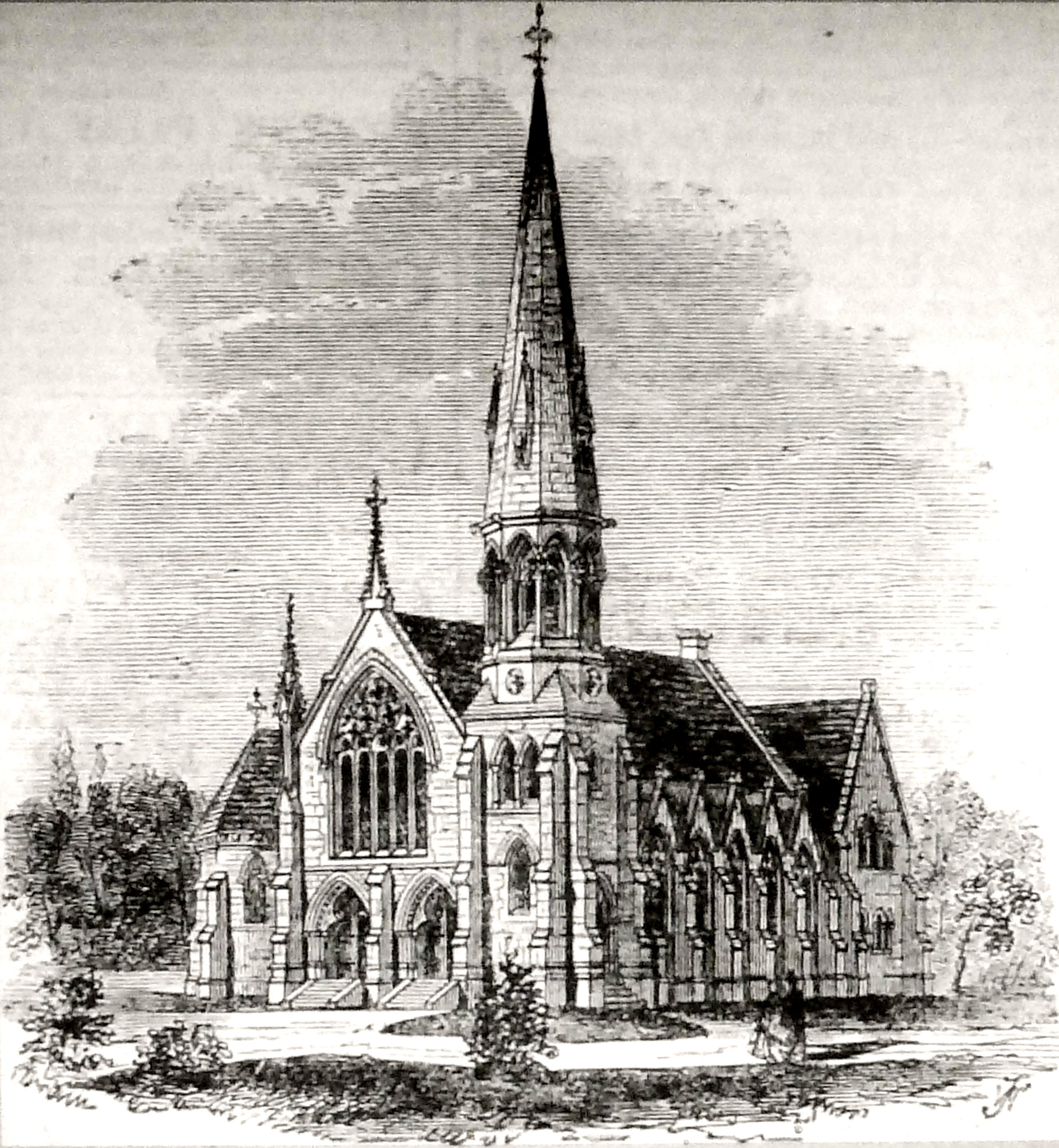
Original building with two front doors and two pinnacles, 1862

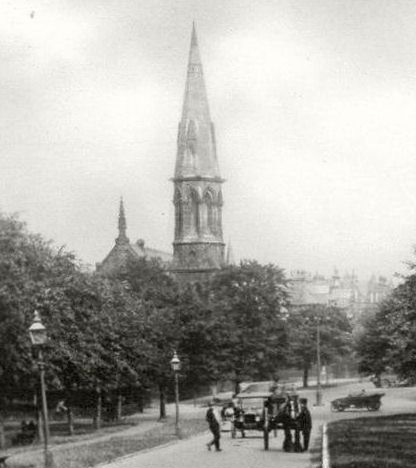
Church still has one pinnacle, 1900–1914

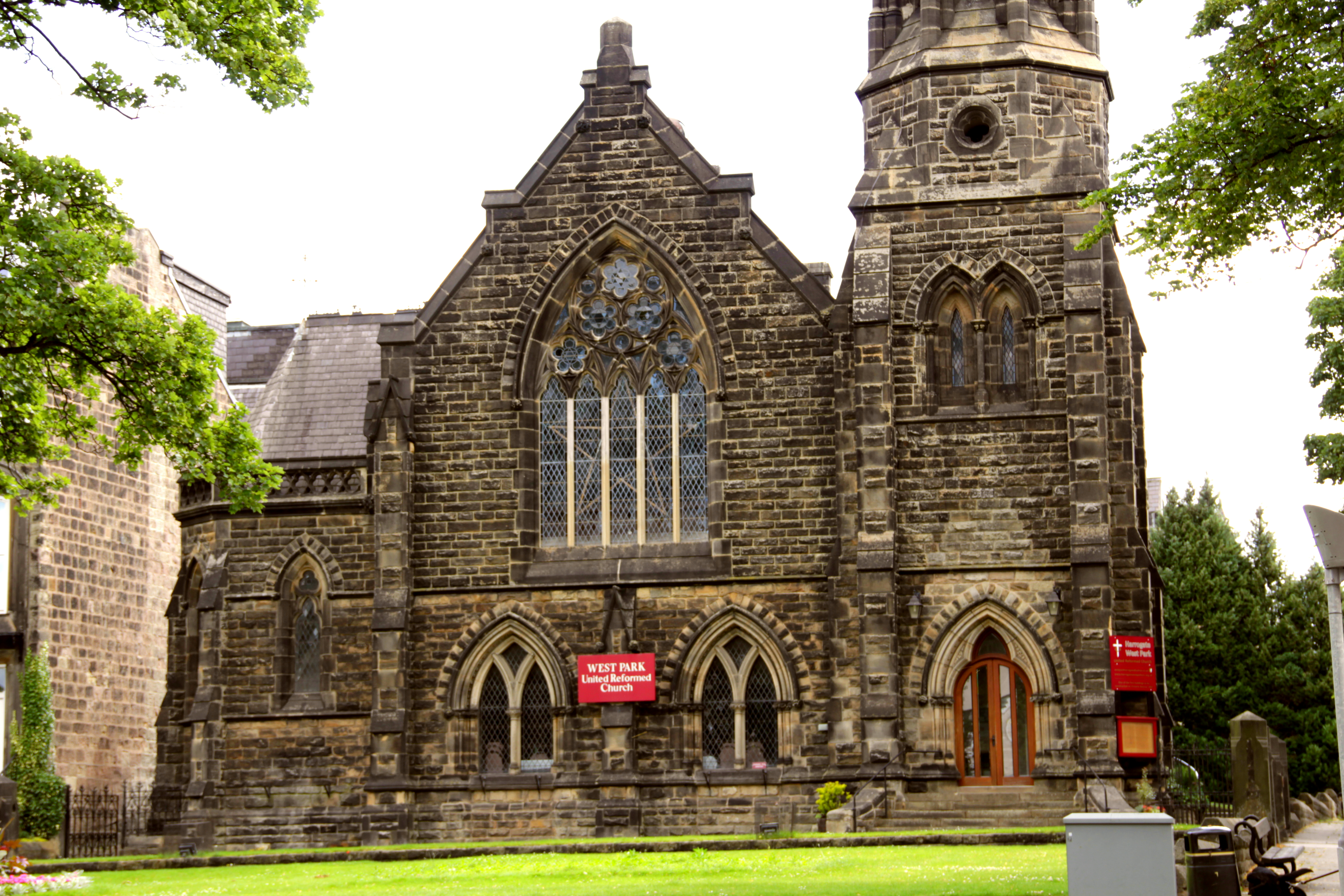
One front door (moved to tower) and no pinnacle, 2020

=== Foundation stone ===
The works had already started when the foundation stone was laid on Wednesday 14 August 1861, in front of a large crowd of Harrogate spa visitors and residents, by Frank Crossley MP. Following a service and a sermon "remarkable for the power and elegance of its diction" by Reverend G.W. Conder, (Note: George William Conder (1821–1874). Minister of Belgrave Chapel, Leeds 1849–1864.) at the Independent Chapel, the company including twenty priests and three judges processed to the new site. A "large concourse of persons ... including a considerable number of ladies" awaited them. Under the cornerstone was placed a time capsule in the form of a sealed bottle, containing documents, newspapers and coins. Using his presentation silver trowel, Crossley laid the cornerstone over the cavity and sealed bottle. The company was treated to an address on the history and benefits of Nonconformism. A feast then took place for 130 ladies and gentlemen, followed by speeches and fund-raising for the church; they had so far raised about half of the estimated cost of £5,000.

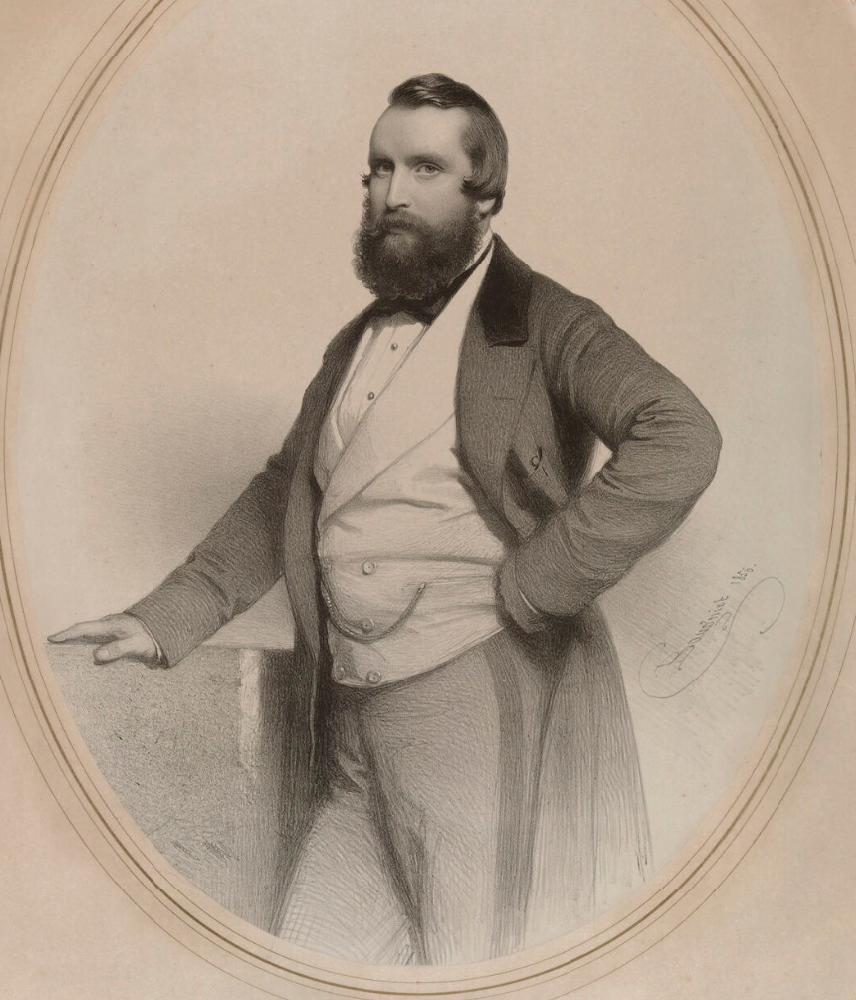
Francis Crossley MP

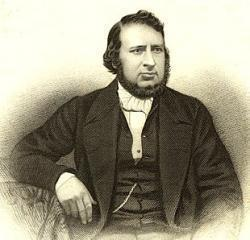
Rev. George William Conder

=== Opening ===
The church opened at 11.00 a.m. on 13 August 1862. At the opening service, the church was full to the extent that extra seating was included in the aisles. Present were "a number of the leading Nonconformist gentlemen of the county [of Yorkshire]." These included John Crossley, (Note: John Crossley of Halifax, politician, owner of John Crossley & Sons carpet mill, and elder brother of Frank Crossley) Edwin Firth, (Note: Edwin Firth, owner of a cotton machinery mill in Huddersfield "Huddersfield County Court". Huddersfield Chronicle. British Newspaper Library. 2 December 1873. p. 3 col 5.) Judge William Willans, (Note: William Willans (b.ca.1801), wool stapler and Justice of the Peace, of Huddersfield "The late William Willans Esq. JP". Huddersfield Chronicle. British Newspaper Archive. 12 September 1863. p. 6 col 1.) Thomas Freeman Firth, (Note: Thomas Freeman Firth (b.ca.1826), merchant and manufacturer of Heckmondwike "Spen Valley baronet's will". Bradford Weekly Telegraph. British Newspaper Archive. 28 January 1910. p. 12 col 3.) Henry Brown, (Note: Henry Brown, mayor of Bradford 1856–1859, philanthropist "The Bradford Eye and Ear Hospital". Bradford Daily Telegraph. British Newspaper Archive. 7 October 1907. p. 3 col 2.) William Milnes, (Note: William Milnes, wool stapler and mill owner, mayor of Bradford "Marriages". Bradford Observer. British Newspaper Archive. 17 April 1834. p. 8 col 1.) John Wade, William Scholefield, Dr John Greenwood, Miles Illingworth, (Note: Miles Illingworth, co-owner with William Murgatroyd of a worsted woollen mill in Bradford. "Obituary notices". Bradford Observer. British Newspaper Archive. 27 April 1865. p. 5 col 2.) John Peele Clapham JP, (Note: John Peele Clapham J.P., of Burley Grange, York (later owned by Bradford Council and Bradford College), landed gentry with coat of arms, wrote the Hymns Selected and Original, Sunday School Union Handbook (1833) "Death of Mr John Peele Clapham". Leeds Times. British Newspaper Archive. 27 November 1875. p. 3 col 3.) John Northorp, (Note: John Northorp, gentleman, of Wakefield) William Hartley Lee, (Note: William Hartley Lee, son-in-law of John Northorp. Lee was a Woollen and worsted yarn manufacturer and a prominent figure in Wakefield public life. "Great meeting at the Bull Hotel". Wakefield and West Riding Herald. British Newspaper Archive. 6 November 1875. p. 6 col 1–2.) John Shaw, (Note: John Shaw, wool stapler (mill owner) and representative for Huddersfield at the Chamber of Commerce. "A minister of commerce". South Wales Echo. British Newspaper Archive. 26 September 1888. p. 3 col 5.) Jabez Howell (Note: Jabez Howell (1815–1888) of Harrogate, son of nonconformist minister William Howell and brother of artist Samuel Howell (1807–1876). "Funeral of the late Mr Samuel Howell". Huddersfield Chronicle. British Newspaper Archive. 21 October 1876. p. 7 col 3.), George Brown, R. Gallsworthy, Henry Francis Lockwood, Rev. Dr Thomas Raffles, Rev. S. Martin, Rev. J.G. Neall, Rev. G.W. Conder, (Note: Rev. George William Conder (1821–1874), Belgrave Chapel, Leeds "Death of the Rev. G.W. Conder". Leicester Guardian. British Newspaper Archive. 11 November 1874. p. 3 col 6.) Rev. J.H. Morgan, (Note: Rev. James Hughes Morgan, son of Rev. David Morgan (Pendre Chapel Llanfillin), independent minister of Holbeck who took part in the 1866 Manhood Suffrage (Reform) demonstration on Woodhouse Moor, and was banned from preaching at a Leeds chapel in consequence (although he and Rev. G.W. Conder hastily denied the ban later) "The Rev. J.H. Morgan and Headingley Hill Church (followed by) The Rev Mr. Morgan's speech on Woodhouse Moor". Leeds Mercury. British Newspaper Archive. 27 October 1866. p. 8 col 2.) Rev. W. Howes, (Note: Rev. W. Howes may be a misprint. Rev. W. Howe was a missionary who returned from Tahiti in 1845 after its population under Queen Pomare had risen against them in the Franco-Tahitian War and driven them out. "Arrival of the missionaries from Tahiti". Leeds Mercury. British Newspaper Archive. 8 February 1845. p. 4 col 2.) Rev. R. Harris, (Note: Rev. R. Harris was a minister of the Zion Chapel, Morley, Leeds. "Morley". Leeds Mercury. British Newspaper Archive. 25 June 1857. p. 3 col 3.) Rev. F. Barnes, (Note: Rev. F. Barnes B.A. of the Old Chapel, Morley, West Yorkshire (misprinted as Banes in the guest list). "Leeds Missionary Society, Morley Auxiliary". Leeds Mercury. British Newspaper Archive. 7 October 1863. p. 3 col 5.) Rev. Henry Simon, (Note: Rev. Henry Simon (1837–1892), a Congregational minister at Harecourt, Westminster and Tolmers Square chapels, London. "The late Rev. Henry Simon". Islington Gazette. British Newspaper Archive. 29 August 1892. p. 3 col 3.) Rev. Joseph Croft, (Note: Rev. Joseph Croft, minister at the Independent Chapel, Ripon "Lecture, Ripon". Richmond & Ripon Chronicle. British Newspaper Archive. 12 December 1857. p. 3 col 4.) and Rev. Horrocks Cox. (Note: Rev. Horrocks Cox was minister at Tockholes Congregational Church 1857–1861. He was involved in a court case in 1867. "Tockholes Congregational Church, laying memorial stone". Blackburn Standard. British Newspaper Archive. 15 May 1880. p. 8 col 4.) Rev Raffles preached a "powerful sermon" which brought in a respectable collection of £89 6s. 3d.

The building committee and many of the visiting VIPs met in the school room in the afternoon to organise efforts to complete funding of the works. Even after raising £1,290 in the sale of the former chapel, the committee would still owe £1,500. The VIPs brought money gifts and promises totalling £710 towards the debt. The evening service, bringing in a collection of £51. 9s. 9d., was conducted by Rev. S. Martin of Westminster.

=== At the opening ===
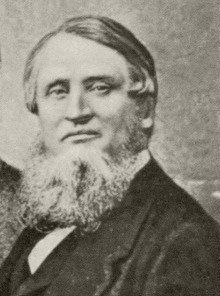
John Crossley MP

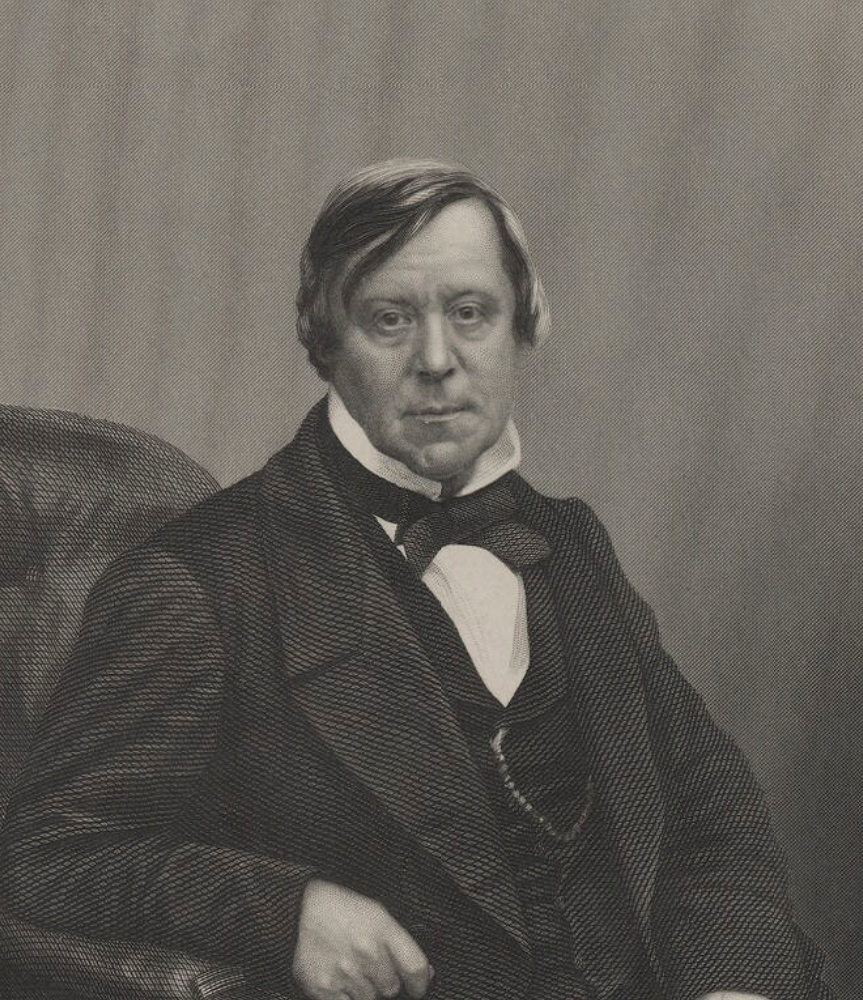
William Scholefield MP

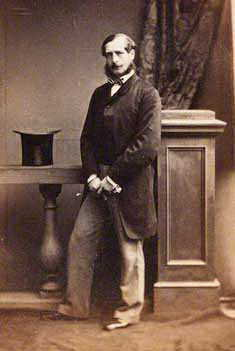
John Greenwood MP

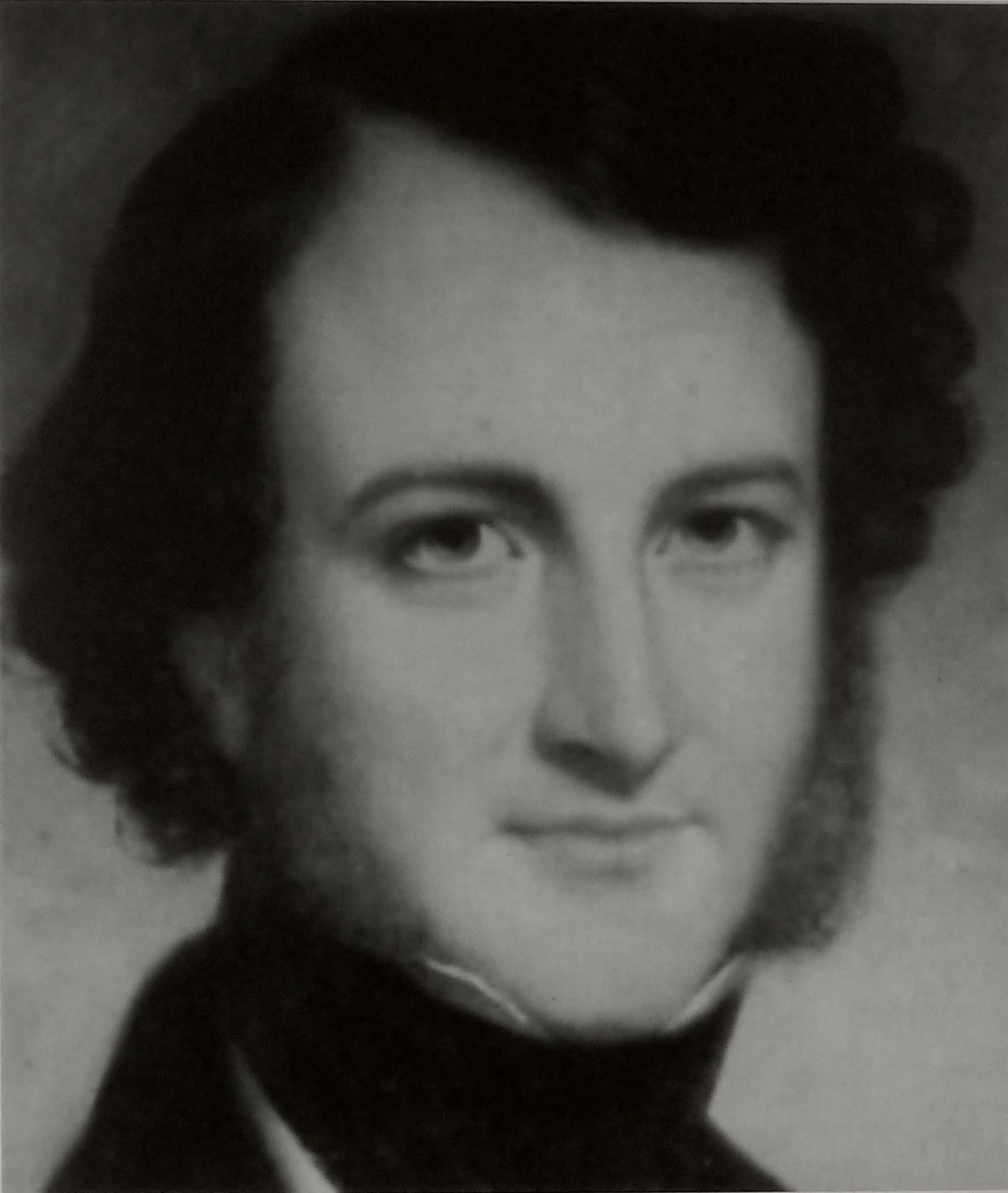
Henry Francis Lockwood, architect

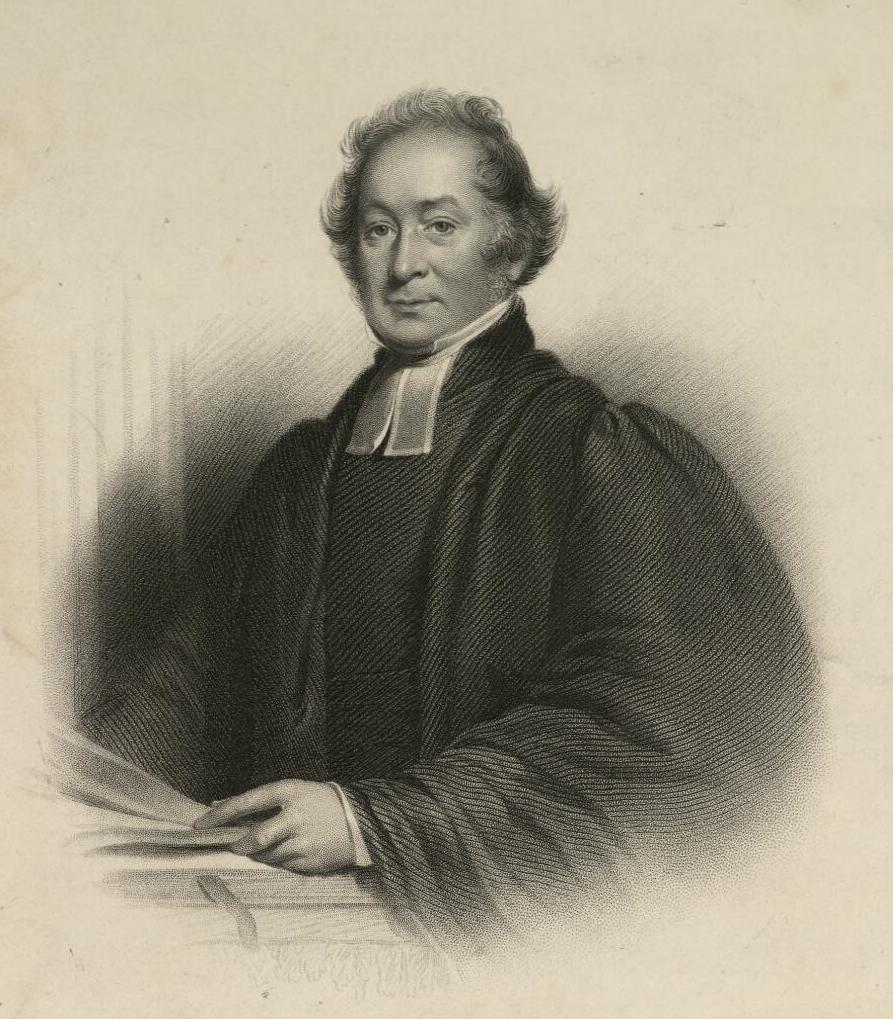
Rev. Thomas Raffles

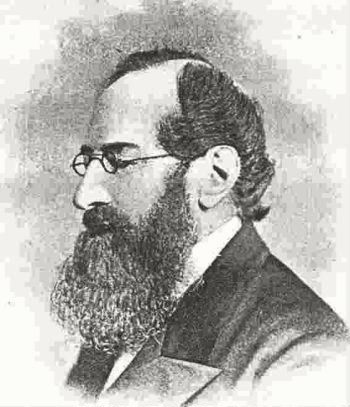
John Peele Clapham JP

== Building ==
=== Site and works ===
The site of the church was at one of the entrances to the development estate of Victoria Park, which was created at about the same time, and faced west towards The Stray. "The site [was originally] inclosed by a low fence-wall and handsome Gothic railing and gates, and the flagged footpath [was] five yards in width." The total cost of land, materials and labour was £5,871 19s. 5d, the building alone costing £4,339. The contractor for the works was R. Ellis Junior of Harrogate. John P. Clapham J.P. led the building committee and superintended the works.

=== Exterior ===
It was described in 1863 by the Illustrated London News as a "beautiful Congregational Church." It is built of "rusticated gritstone ashlar with strings, buttresses and pairs of gargoyles, (Note: Historic England mentions gargoyles between the bays, but those are heads of Protestant Reformers; the gargoyles are on the tower) between bays." It was designed for 700 people, and has a tower and a "very elegant" spire 130 feet (40 m) high, the whole being inspired by the Decorated Gothic style. The belfry and spire are octagonal. The building originally had three main trefoiled doorways, giving access to the vestibule, and thence to the aisles, the ground floor, and the staircase to the west gallery. The two west-front entrances are now windows, and the tower contains the single main entrance, which has been moved to the west side. The west end of the building has a five-light window and a small belfry. The two-light windows on the south side have coped gables above, and on the exterior of those gables are the twelve sculpted heads of historical characters, including Isaac Watts, John Bunyan, John Milton and Oliver Cromwell. These sculptures appear to be late 19th or early 20th century replacements, and the church website says they may have been carved by a Roman Catholic artist. The roof has fishtail slates. At the back of the building are the chapel, and the minister's and deacon's vestries. At right angles to the building are the school and classrooms to seat 200 children, and these were built with separate entrances for boys and girls.

In 1999 an outside ramp was added along the southern wall for wheelchair access. In 2000, as a millennium project, floodlights were installed to light up the exterior.

=== Heads on south wall ===
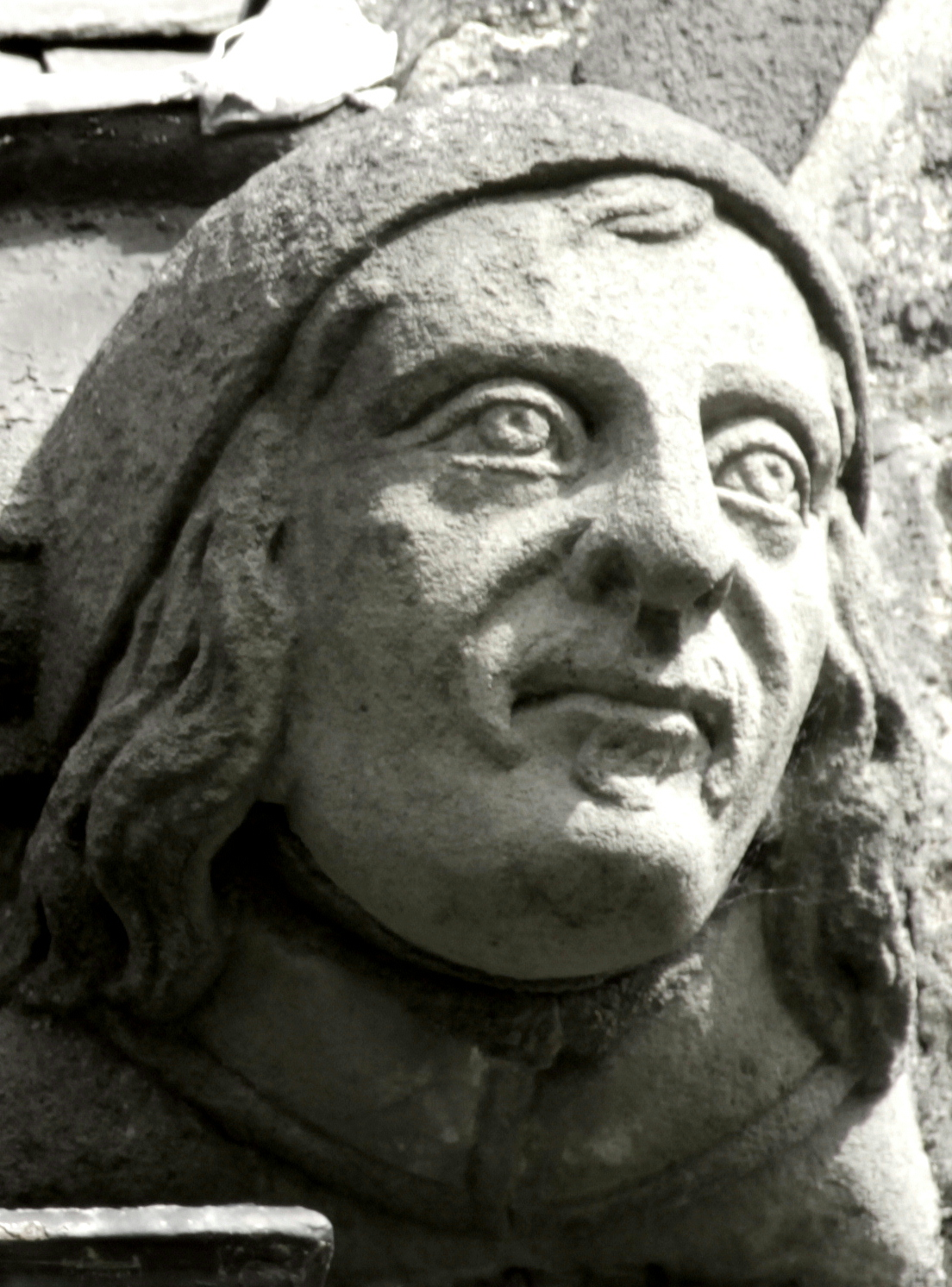
John Bunyan

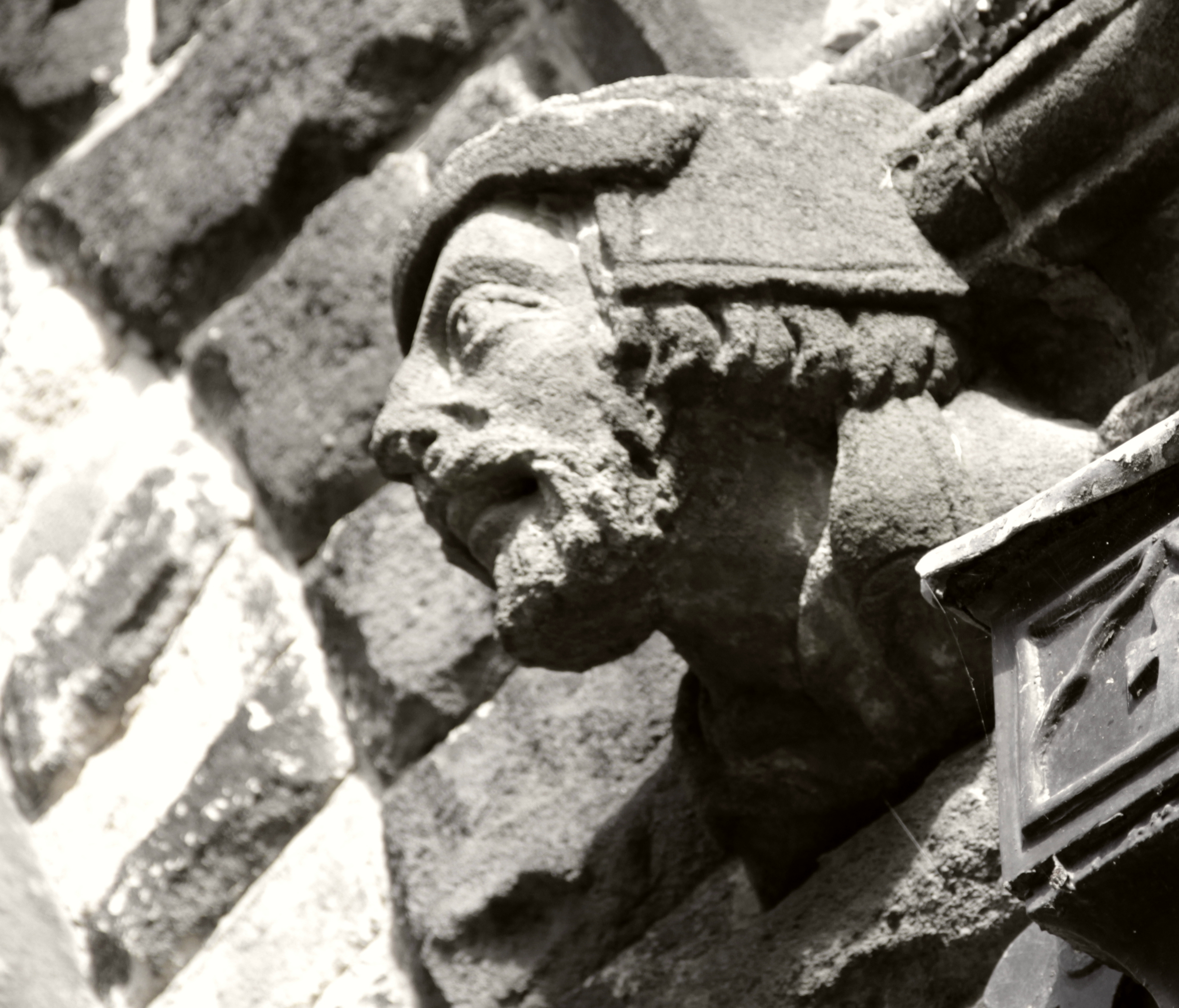
John Calvin

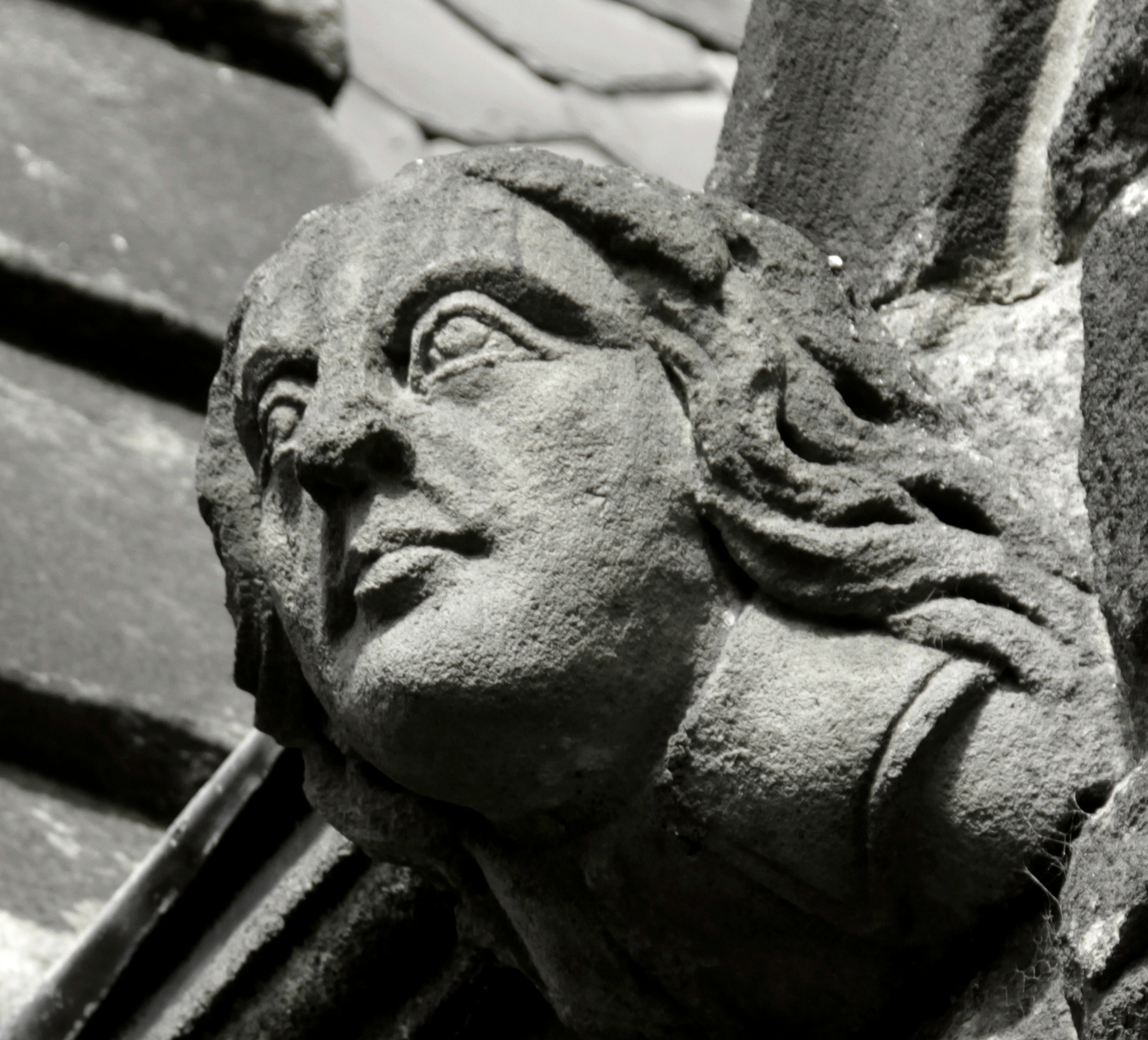
Oliver Cromwell

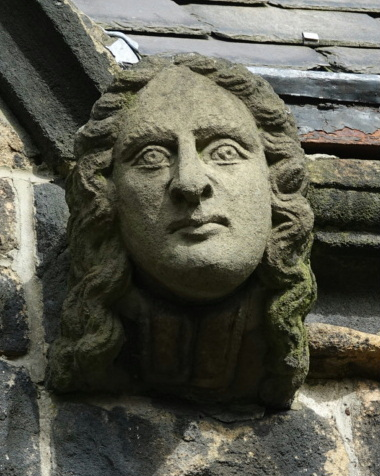
Philip Doddridge

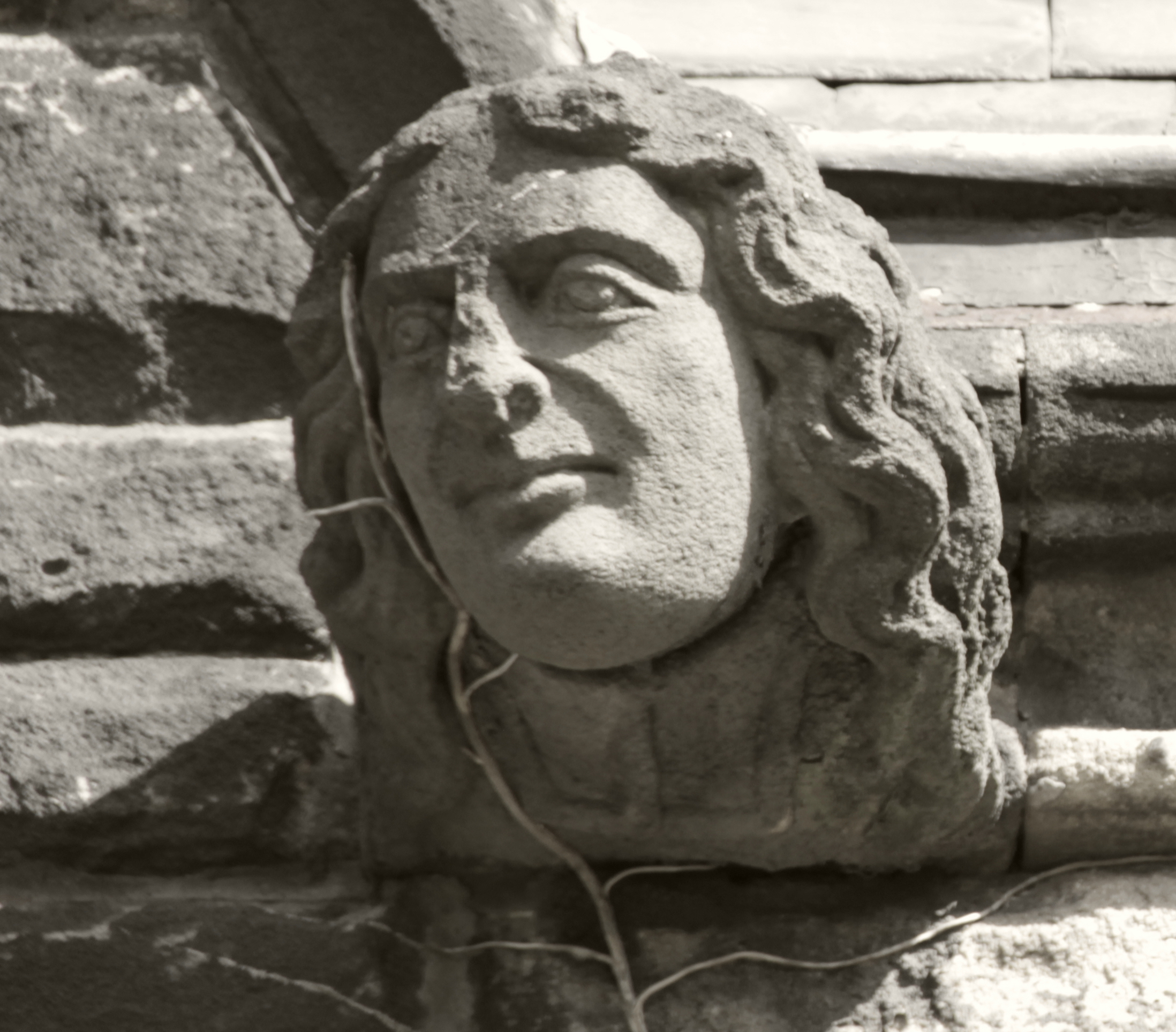
John Dryden

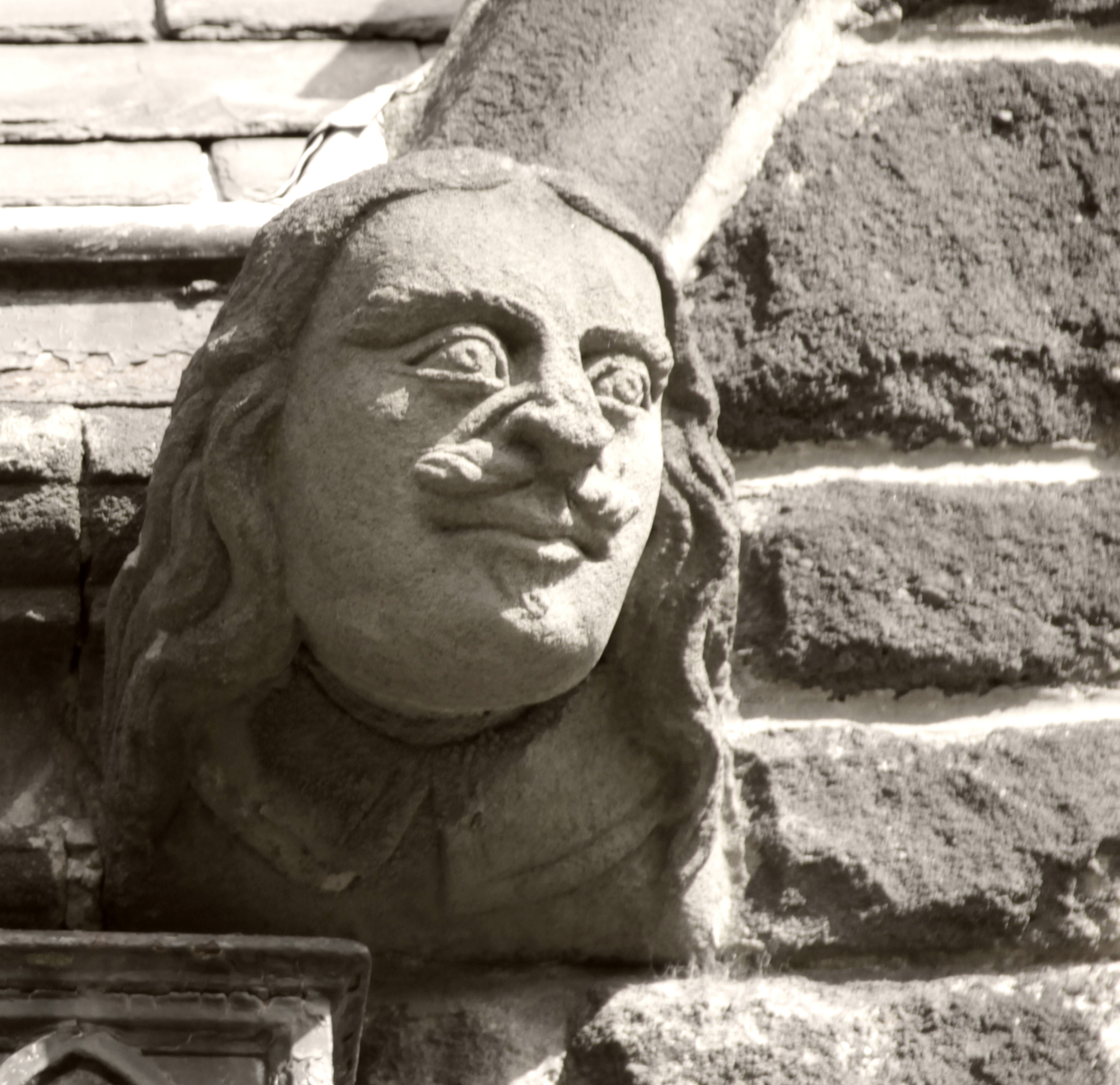
Thomas Fairfax

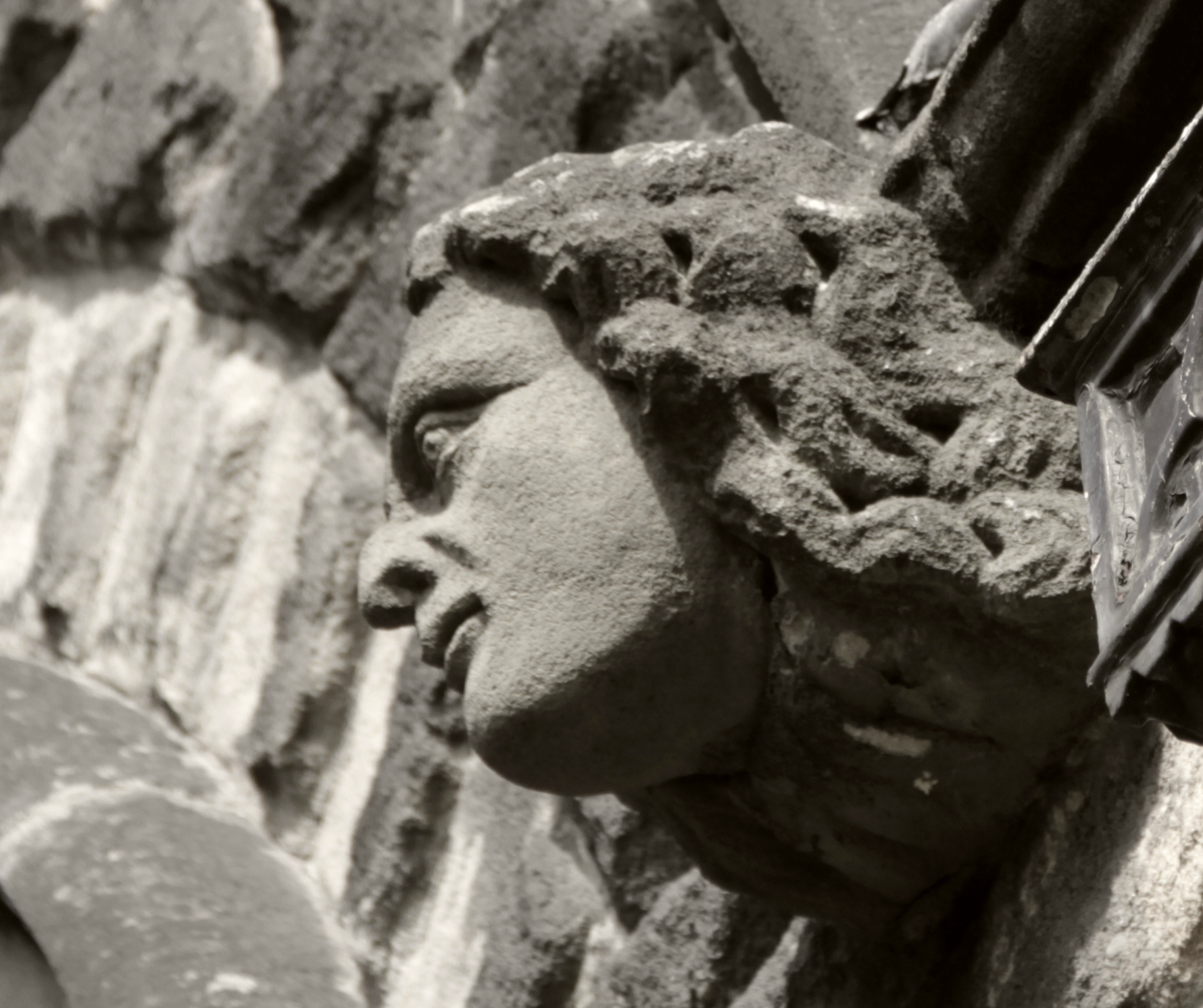
John Locke

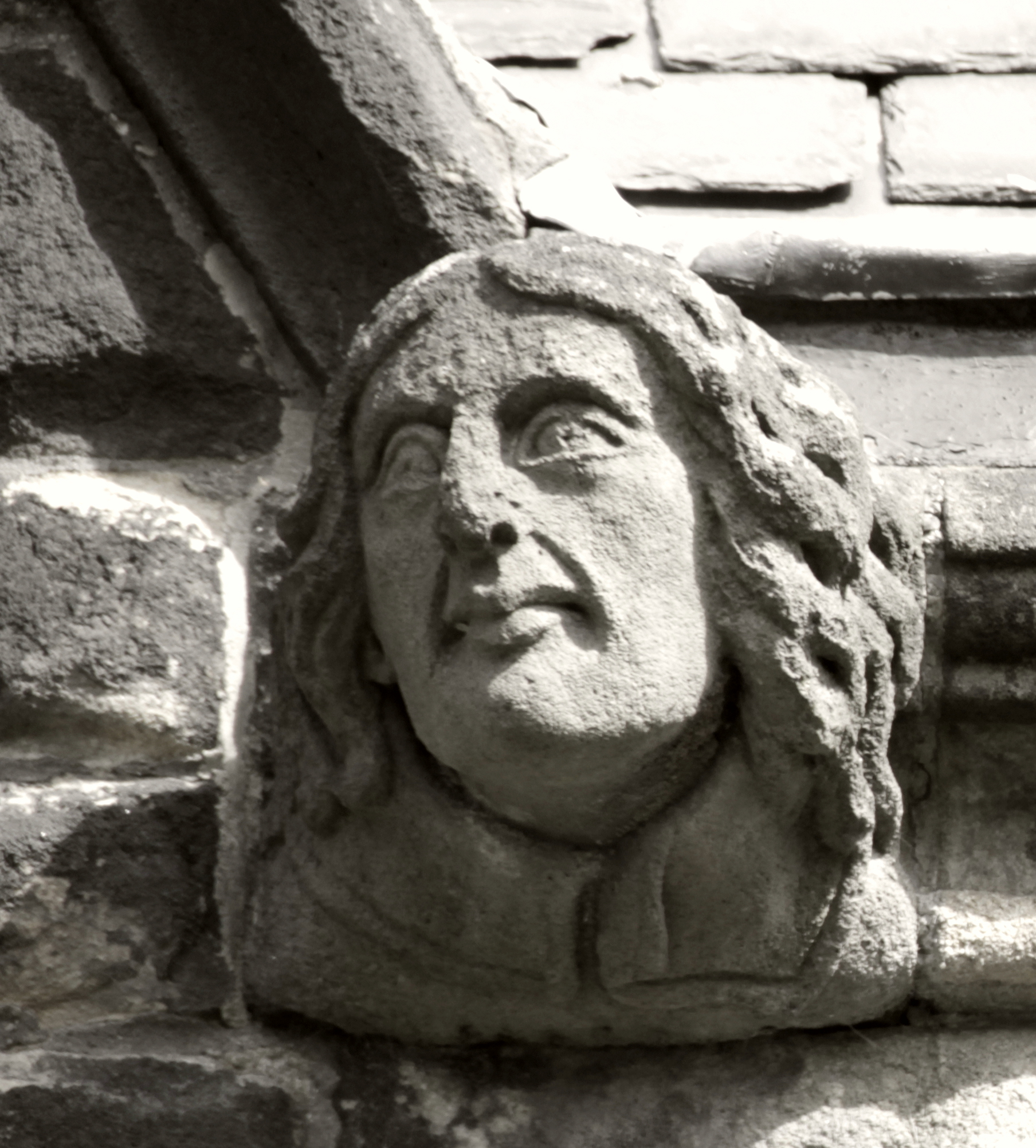
Andrew Marvell

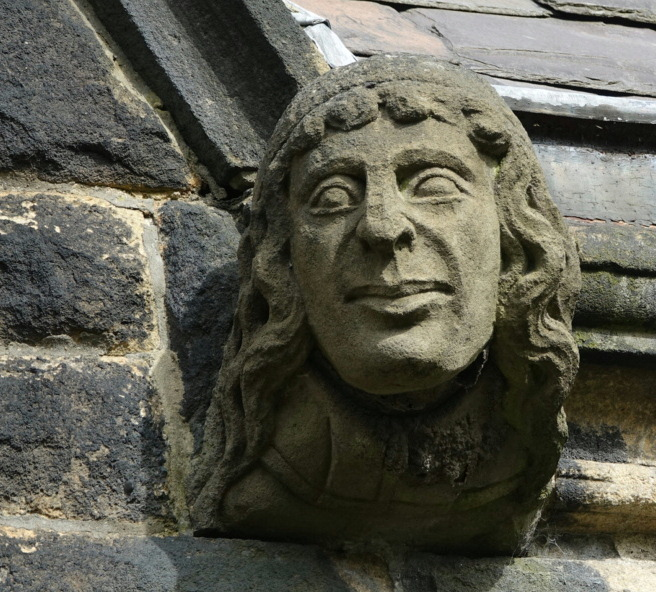
John Milton

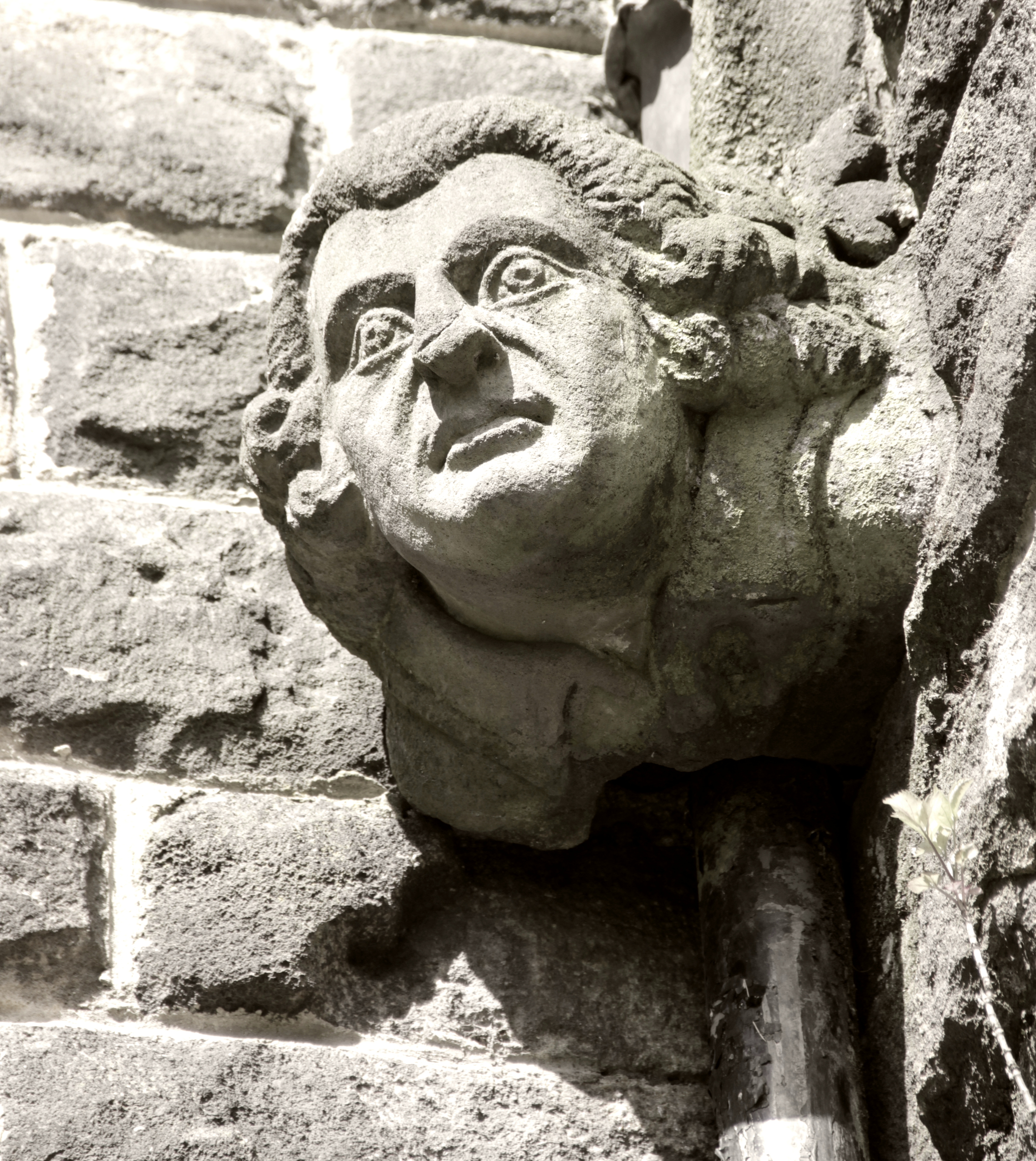
Joseph Priestley

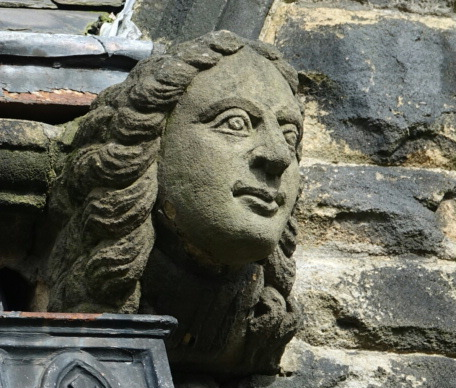
Isaac Watts

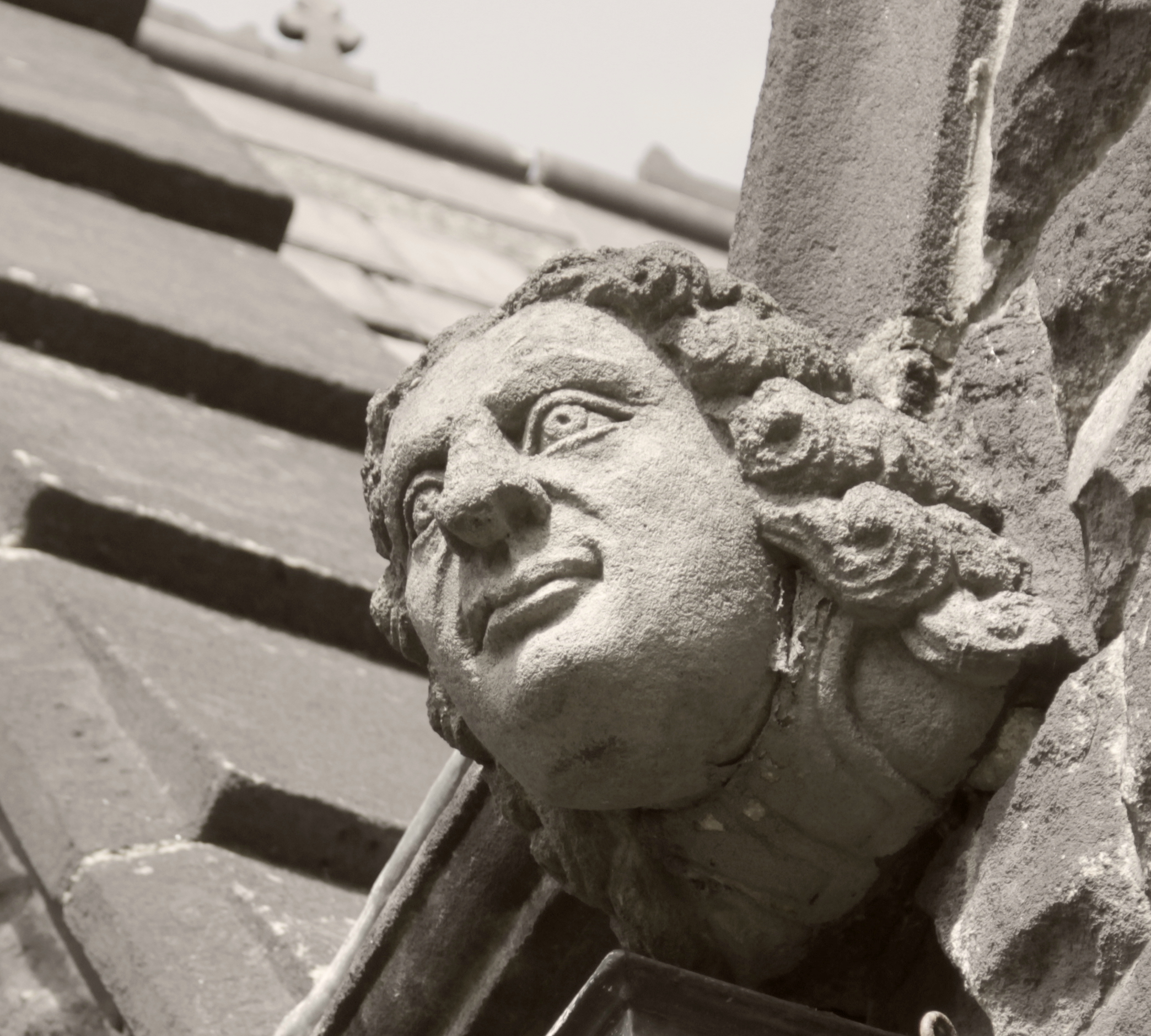
Charles Wesley

=== Interior ===
The main interior ground floor space is a 72 by 44 feet (22 m × 13 m) parallelogram and is 38.5 feet (11.7 m) high, the lack of transepts and side-aisles being conducive to good acoustics. The roof is supported internally by iron columns with foliated capitals, and the five traceried lights of the west window are visible above the gallery. The original open pews (destroyed in 2019) had leaning backs, and were wide so as to accommodate the wide skirts - or perhaps figures - of rich visitors in the spa season. The interior was originally lit by "two handsome brass coronas, each of thirty lights." There are three First World War memorials: two stained glass windows with figures of St Michael with St George, and David and Jonathan, and a brass wall plaque. There are also plaques in memory of John Peel Clapham who chaired the building committee 1861–1862, (Note: As of August 2020, the Clapham plaque is now missing) and the church's first minister Rev. John H. Gavin.

Considerable modernisation has taken place here. In 1993 the pulpit was removed and the sanctuary adapted for use by drama and music groups. The Communion table was moved to the centre of the dais, and the organ was rebuilt at this time. The old lavatory known as the ladies' parlour became a suite of renovated toilets and the Raglan Room, which is now used for meetings. In 1994 the original school rooms at the east end of the building were modernised and adapted for use by various organisations. In 1999 floor levels were adapted for accessibility. At some point the interior was split vertically so that it had a first floor hall with a stage and kitchen. In 2002 this upstairs space was fully modernised with a badminton court, and named the West Park Hall in 2003. Between 2012 and 2014 the heating was repaired, the sanctuary refurbished and the pews removed. As of 2020 the church is considering "further major alterations."

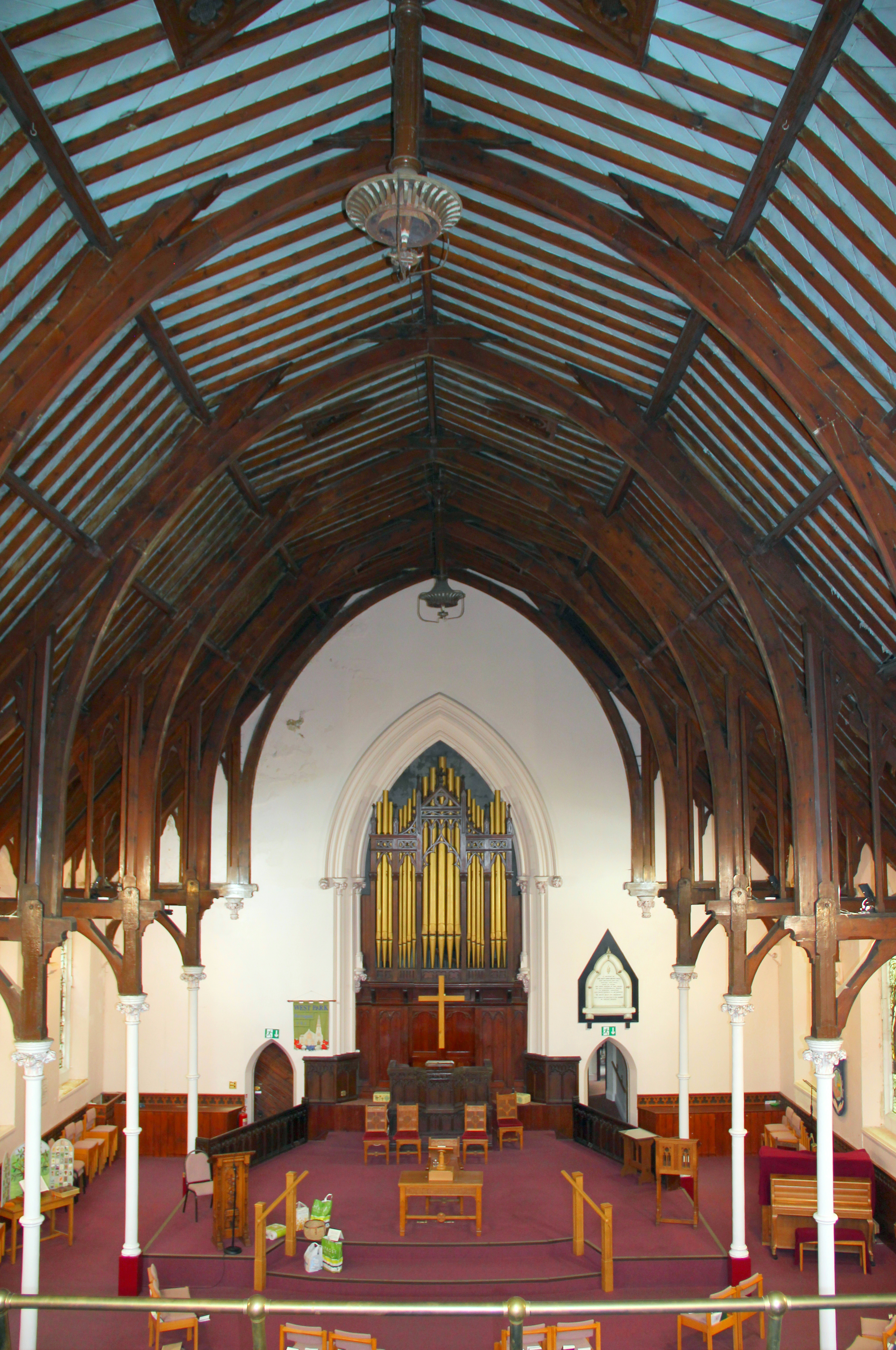
False hammer beam roof

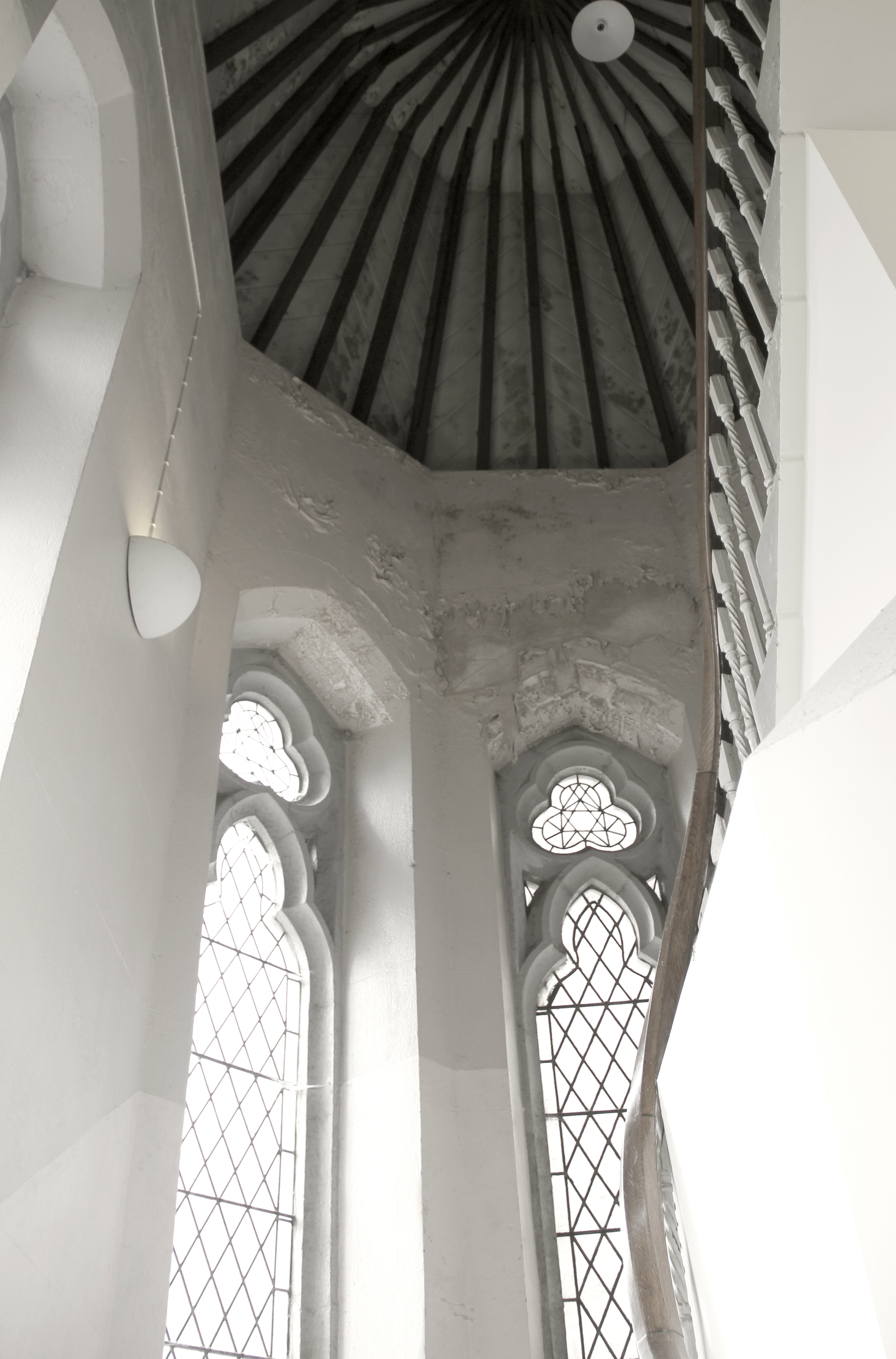
Gallery staircase

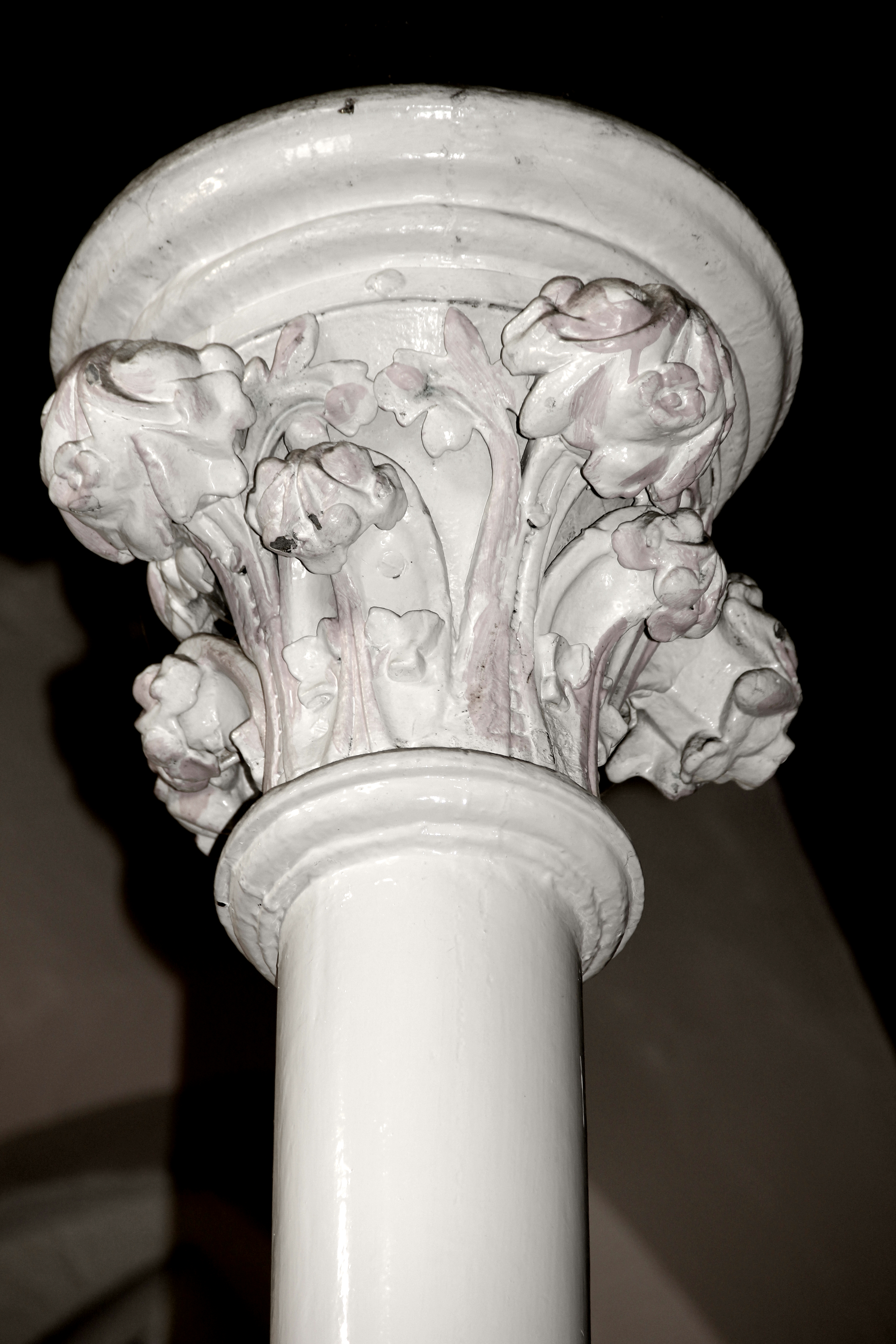
Cast iron column

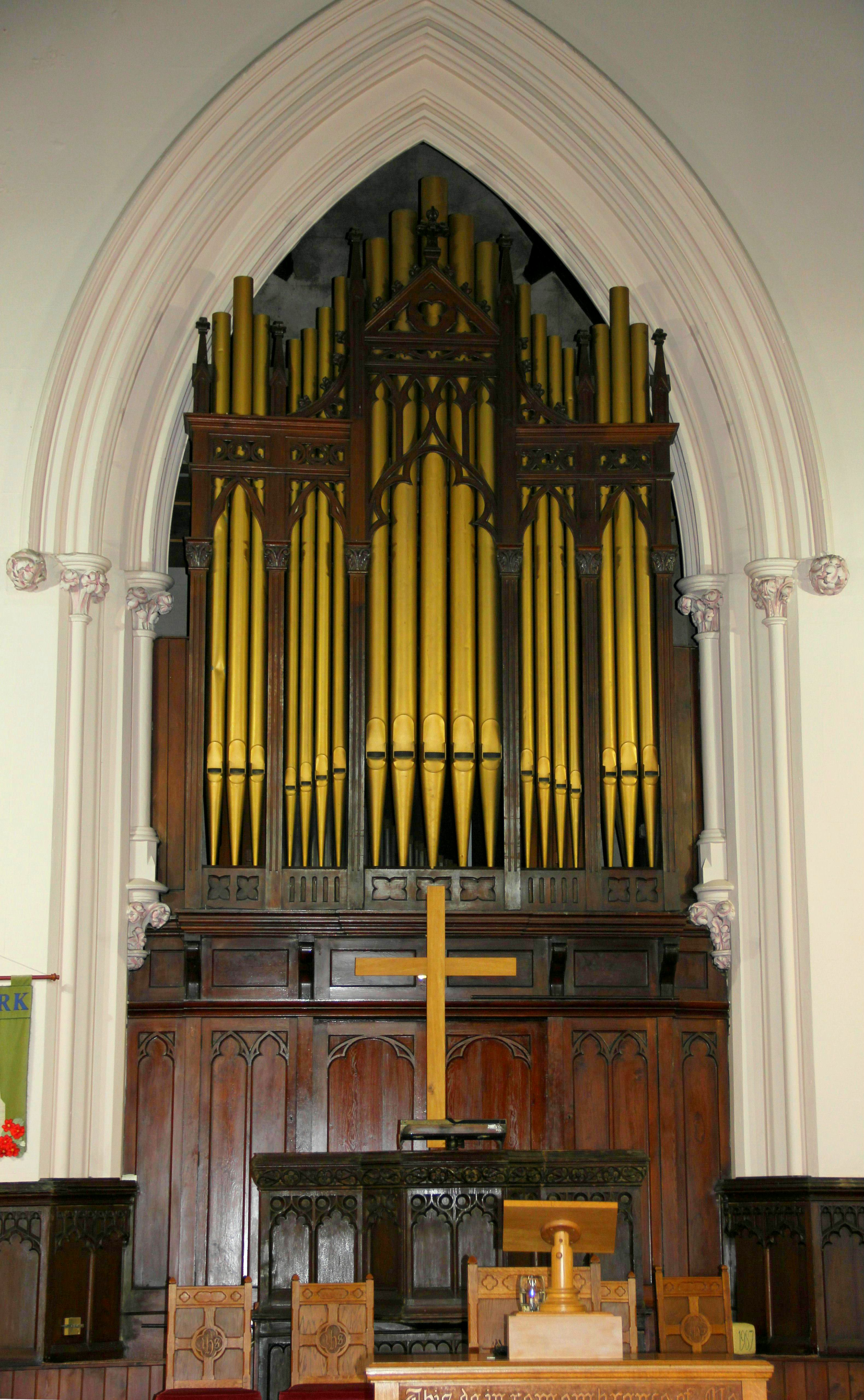
Binns organ

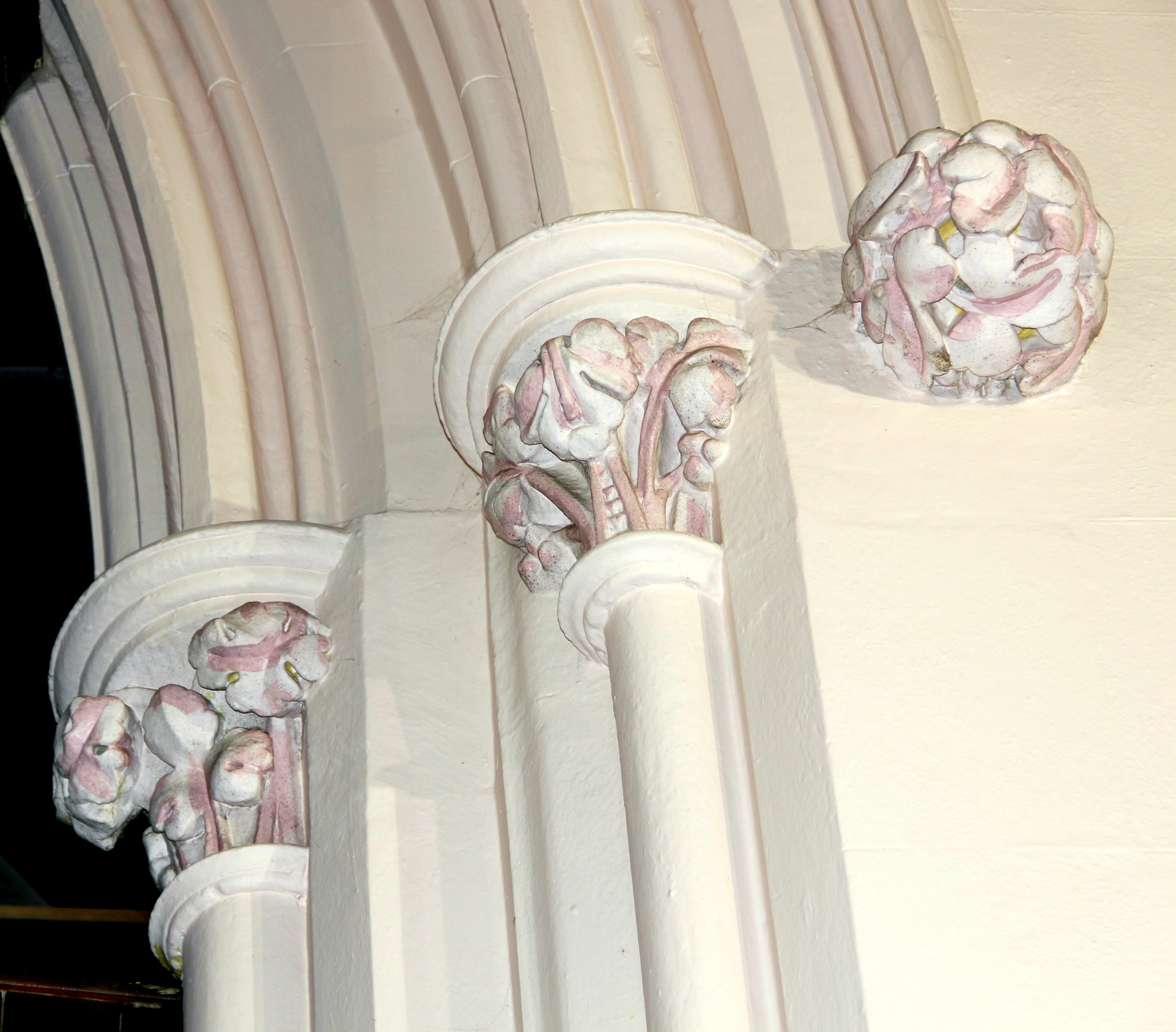
Carving on organ arch

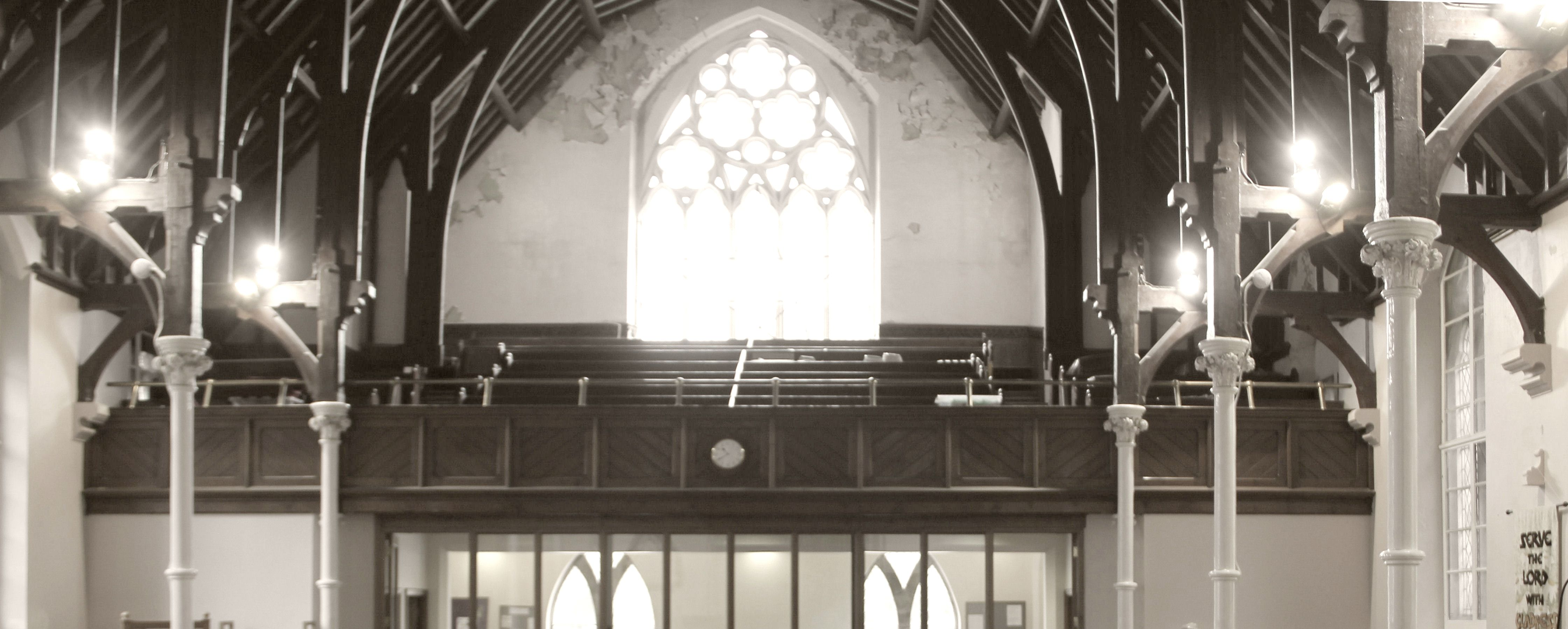
Gallery with original pews

=== Organ and bell ===
The church's first organ was installed by Booth of Wakefield at a cost of £350 in 1869. On 7 July 1869 organist W.T. Best opened the instrument by playing "airs, solos, recitatives, quartets and choruses." The second pipe organ was obtained from Forster and Andrews in 1899. The current 1894 James Jepson Binns organ was obtained from the much larger St. Paul's Church, Semilong, Northampton, (Note: St Paul Northampton (built 1890, designed by Matthew Holding) was demolished around 1999) in 1993 and installed inside the original Forster and Andrews casing by Peter Wood. (Note: The organ console was made by Peter Woods' father, and the pump is now electrified. (information from Peter Wood).)

There is one Mears 3 cwt bell in G in the tower. It was cast in 1812. The inscription on the bell says: "IB: THOS EMMATT CHAPEL WARDEN 1812 THOS MEARS OF LONDON FECIT." When Christ Church was built in 1831, St John's, the previous church on that site, was demolished and its bell taken by the Nonconformists to their chapel in James Street, and later in 1862 to the present building. As of February 2020 the bell was still rung on Sundays.

=== Stained glass windows ===
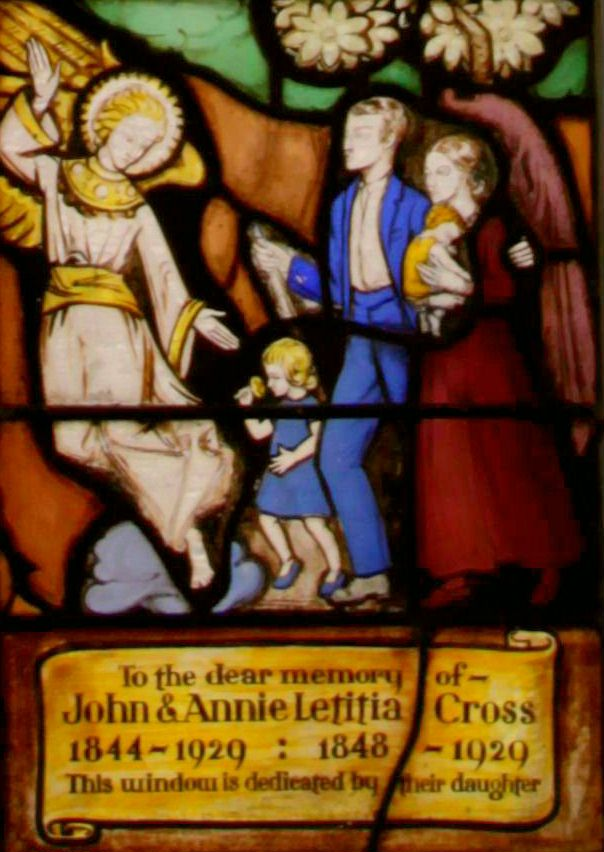
Cross family, 1929

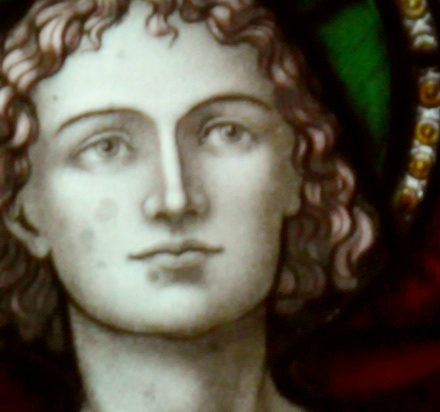
David, ca.1921

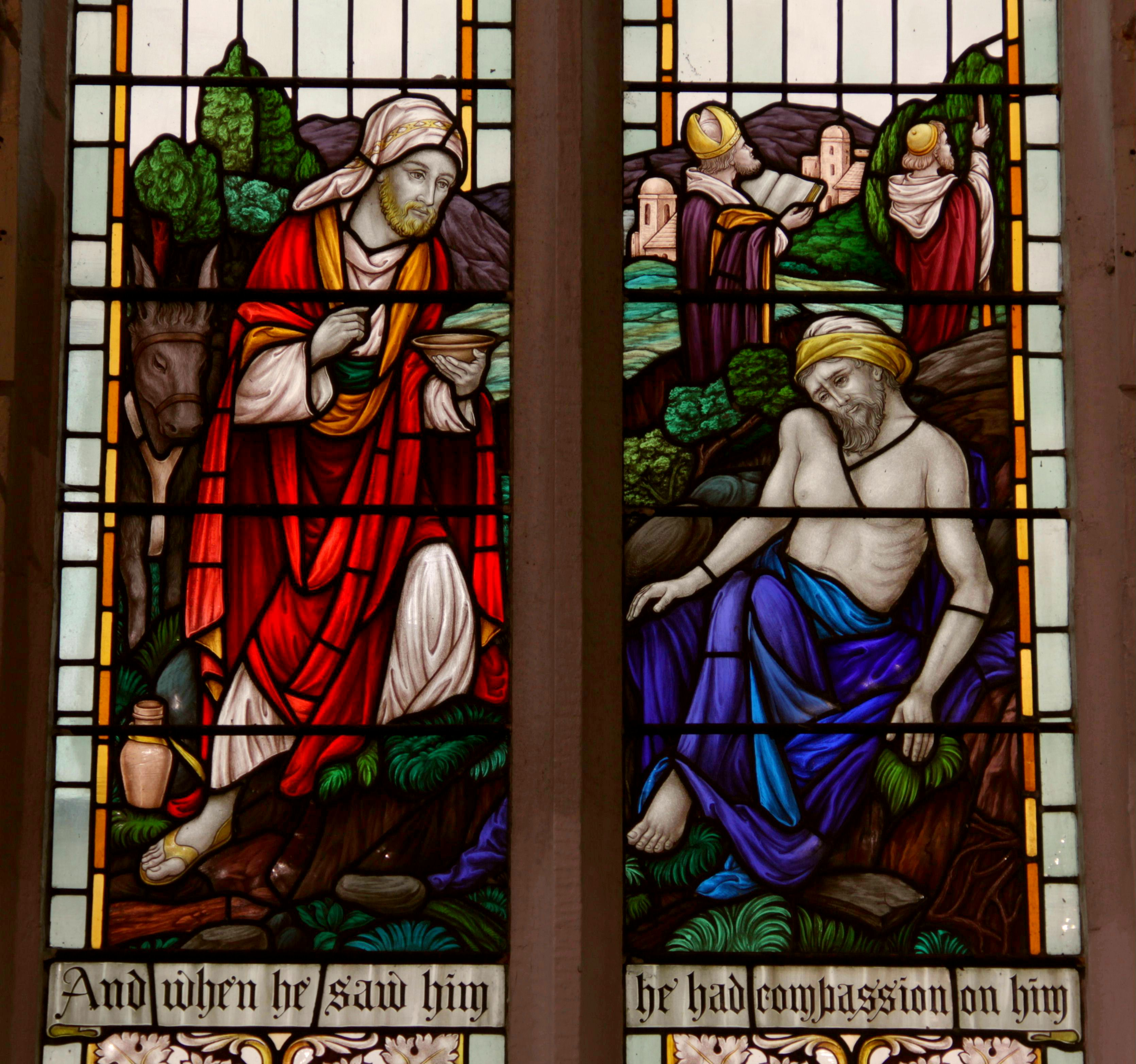
Good Samaritan, 1960s

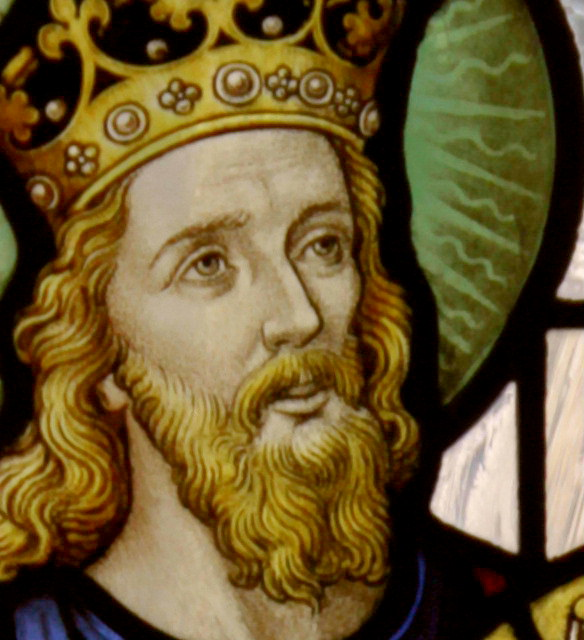
David, 1928

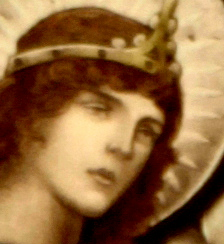
Angel, ca.1921

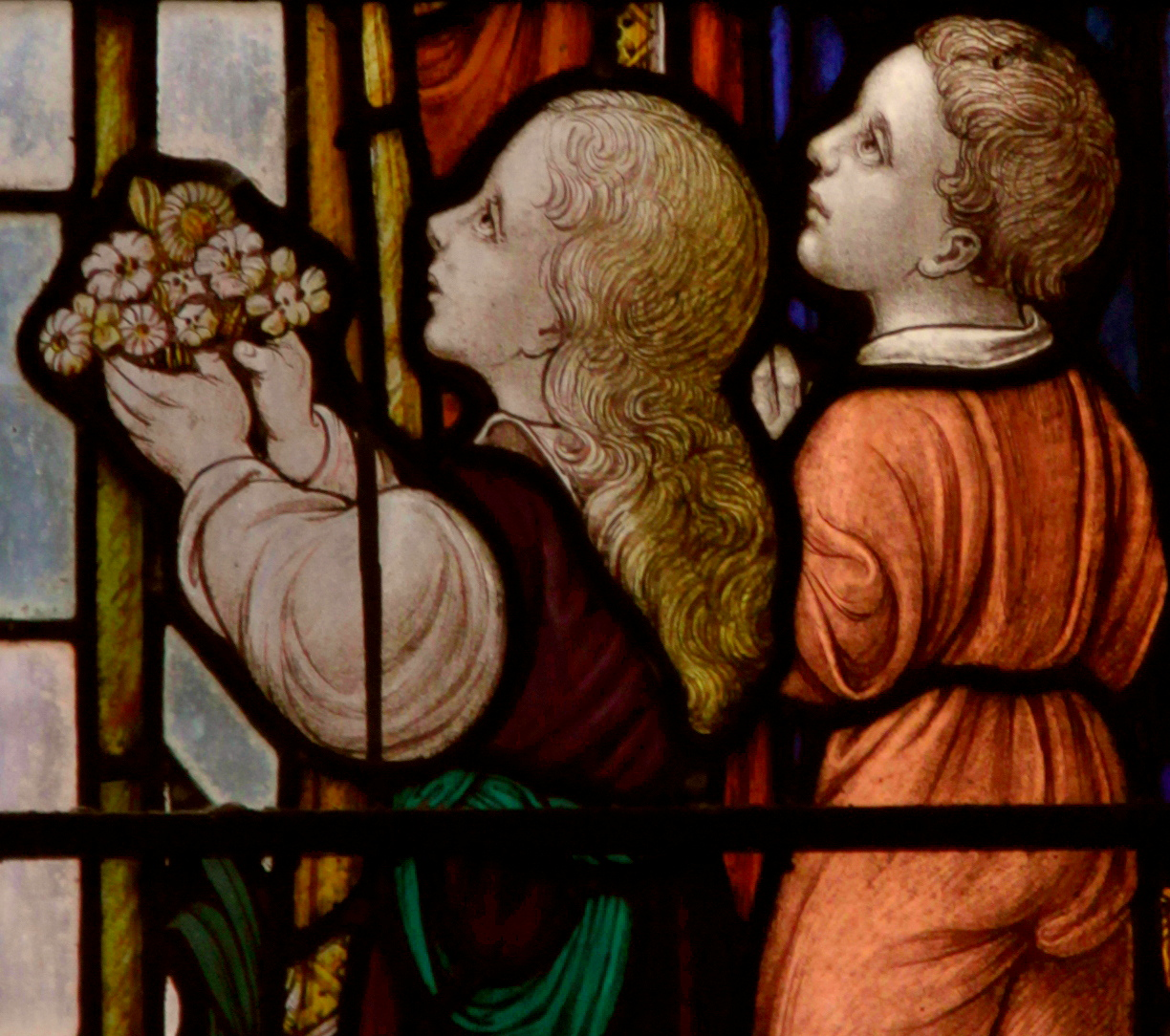
Children, 1940s

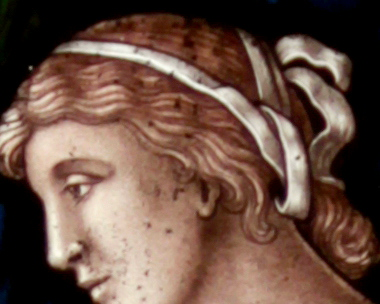
Possible portrait of Clayra Reason, 1901

== Ministers ==
=== Before the West Park building ===
Although there had been Dissenters in the town before, William Howell (1752–20 May 1842) (Note: Rev. William Howell was minister of Congregational Church, Windsor Lane, Knaresborough, for nearly 60 years.) of Knaresborough began a more formal Nonconformist movement in Harrogate when he held regular meetings in Harrogate residences in the early 1800s. Following Howell, ministers at Hope Chapel Skipton Road (c.1813), Cross Chapel Smithy Hill (1823) and Providence Chapel James Street (c.1831) were: Thomas B. Wildsmith (1820), (Note: Thomas Broadbent Wildsmith (1786 – Huddersfield 1856)) William Eltringham (1821–1827), John Whitridge (1827–1829), (Note: Rev. John Whitridge, formerly for 3 years minister at Cannon Street Chapel Manchester, "compelled to change his residence by considerations of health and needed leisure for the accomplishment of undertakings connected with the Holy Scriptures.) H.C. O'Donnohue (1830–1834) and George William Conder (1855–1856).

=== Rev. John Henry Gavin ===
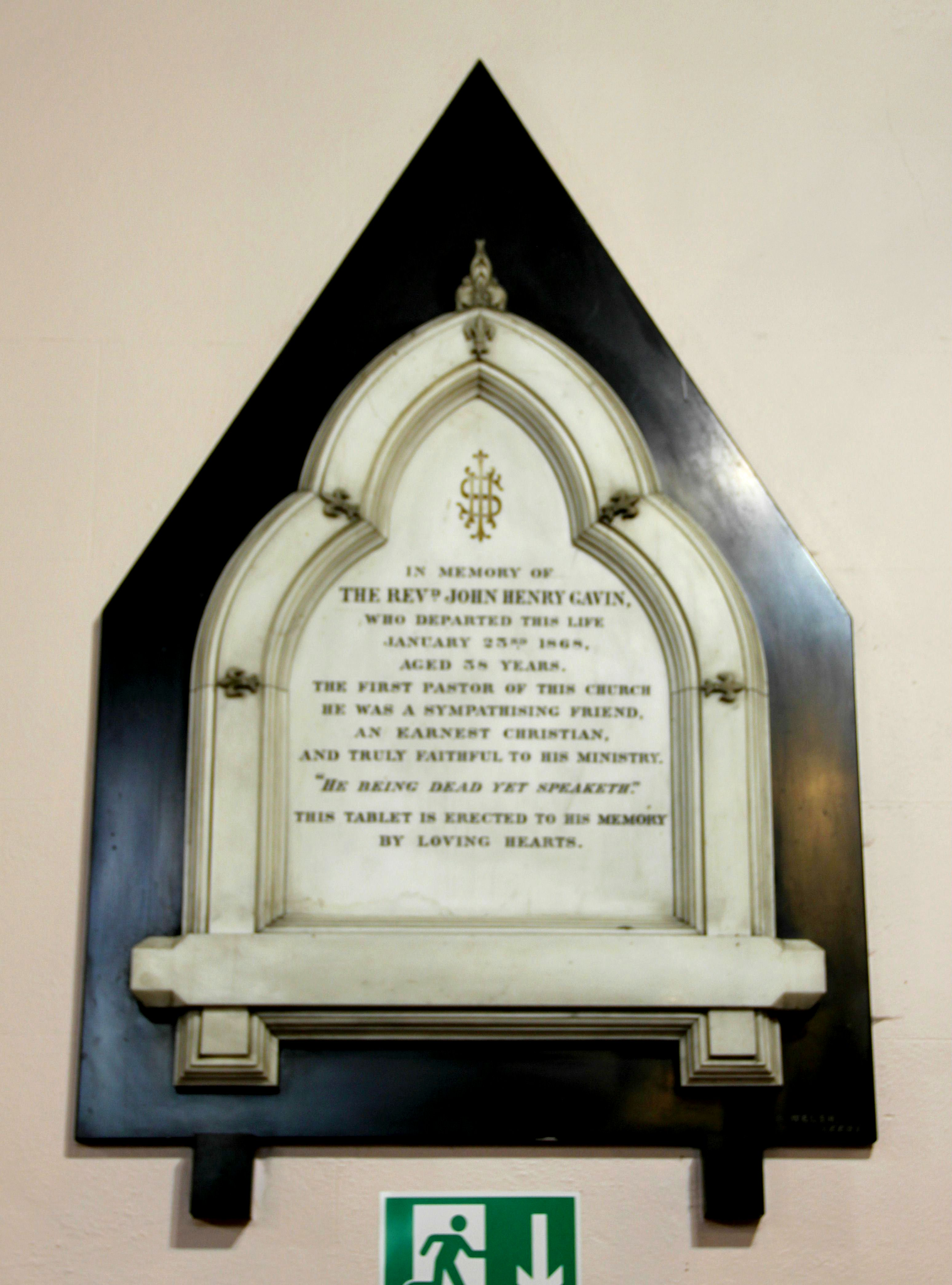
Gavin memorial, in the nave

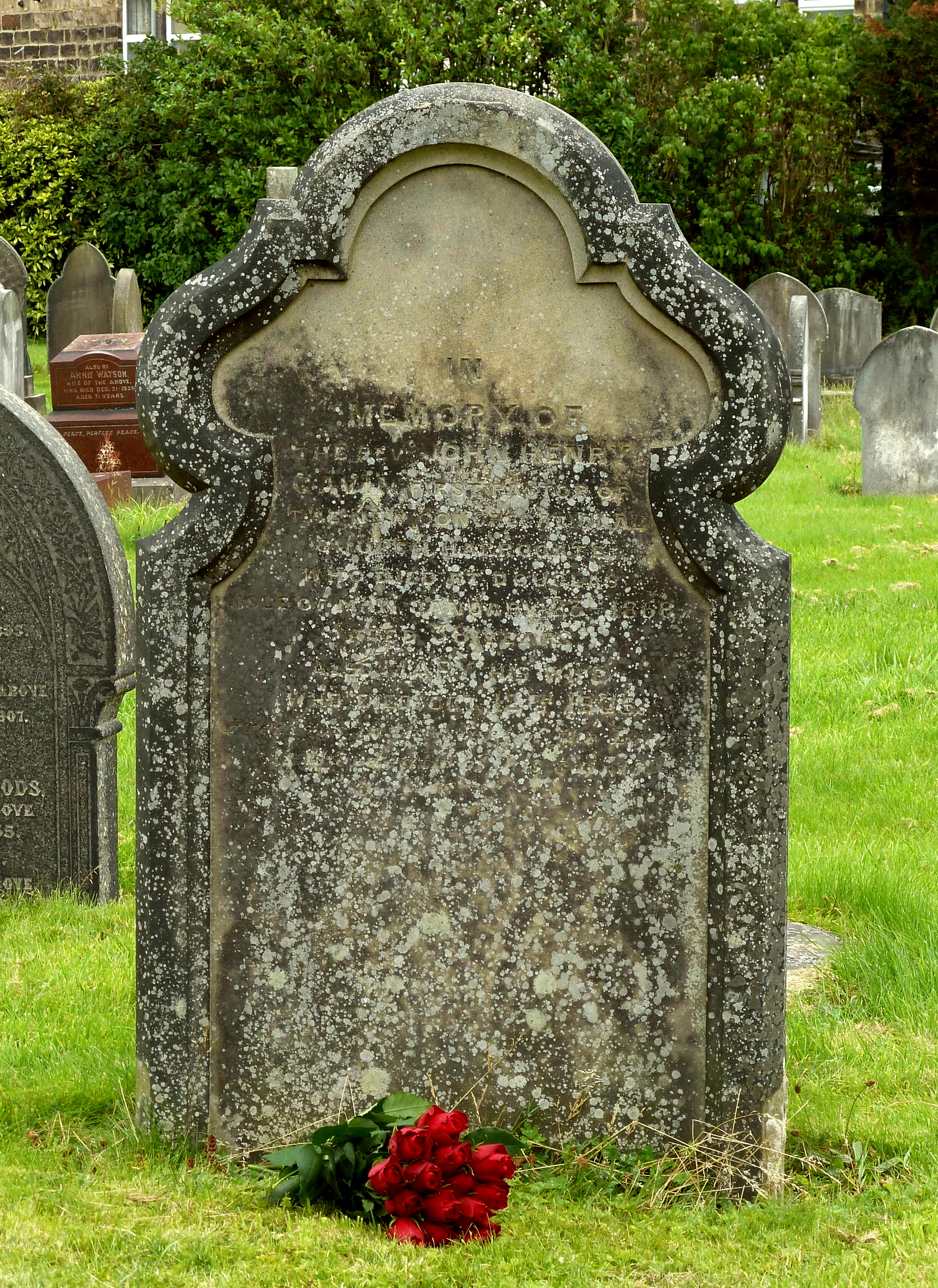
Gravestone of John Henry and Mary Gavin

The first minister at West Park Congregational Church was John Henry Gavin B.A. (Bay of Biscay ca.1831 – Douglas, Isle of Man 23 January 1868). His father was John Patrick Gavin (d.1864), an army man and railway official from Ireland. As Patrick Gavin in the British Army he was stationed in Portugal and the Ionian Islands, and at Liverpool as a sergeant major recruitment officer until 1848. John Henry's mother was Mary Boleridge, from Wexford (d. before 1843). Mary married John Patrick in 1833 in Santa Maura after John Henry's birth. In 1841, at 10 years old, he was living at Ligionere Barracks, Devonport, with his father and brother. Rev. Gavin married Mary Northcroft (Egham ca.1830 - Harrogate 12 October 1905), on 13 July 1858 at Bangor Cathedral. Her father was William Northcroft, a gentleman, in Victorian terms a man of independent means. They had four children: Hamilton Gavin (4 June 1859– 30 December 1874), Mary Cotton (1860–1861), Maud (1861–1947) and Ida Stukeley née Gavin (1864–1957). (Note: Ida Gavin married Edward Charles Stukeley (b.ca.1860), curate of Sudborough, assistant to diocesan inspector of Northamptonshire. They had two sons, Alastair Theodore and Stewart Gavin.) Hamilton died aged 15 years at the Royal Albert Asylum, an institution for children with learning problems, at Scotforth. He died of "tuberculosis and tubercular meningitis, 7 days, with effusion 24 hours." (Note: Information from original birth and death certificates)

Rev. John Henry Gavin was trained at Lancashire Independent College. He was robbed of a silver watch while a student. His first position was at the Congregational Church, Union Street, Hyde, around 1857. (Note: An image of Union Street Congregational Church, Hyde, is here: File:Union Street Congregational Church next to library, Hyde.gif) By 1861 Gavin was still working as a minister at Hyde, and living at Werneth. Gavin served West Park Congregational Church between 1863 and 1868. He died on the Isle of Man aged 38 years, following some years' suffering with tuberculosis, and a year's leave of absence at Douglas. He had a grand funeral and was buried on 31 January 1868 in Grove Road Cemetery, Harrogate, in plot G1123.

Gavin "had endeared himself to the members of his Church by the active, earnest and self-denying zeal of his ministry, and he was highly respected by Christians of all denominations for his readiness at all times to unite with them in all good works."

Unpaid and unofficial, a 19th-century minister's wife's pastoral work frequently equalled her husband's. The death of Gavin left Mary Gavin and the children without support, and a subscription was raised so that she could open a "boarding school for young ladies." The 1871 Census does indeed show Mary Gavin running a boarding school at 7 Park Road, Harrogate. However, by 1881 she was running a boarding house at 100 York Place, Harrogate. In 1887 she was one of the honorary secretaries of the church. By 1901 Mary and Maud had moved back to Hyde, both living on their own means. Mary died of breast cancer on 12 October 1905 aged 84, at 90 Station Parade, Harrogate. In 1879 a black memorial slab with white tablet was dedicated to Gavin, and was fixed above the vestry door inside the church.

=== Later ministers at West Park ===
Other ministers at the church were: Frederick Fox-Thomas (1869–1889), Joseph A. Meeson (1889–1896), Edwin J. Dukes (1898–1899), A. Cooke Hill (1901–1910), W. Henry Pace (1911–1913), W. Morton (1914–1926), Herbert H. Summers (1927–1946), C. Leslie Atkins (1946–1953), and Norman F.W. McPherson (1955–1964). In 1970 the church became West Park URC Church, and the minister who oversaw this change was Hewlett E. Coltman (1965–1981). After Coltman came Ian K. Bird (1981–1990), Richard Kayes (1991–1997), and Robert Heathcote (1998–2004).

Reverend John Campbell was minister of the church from 2011 to 2017. As of 2019 the Elders were running the church, along with interim moderator Rev. Jason McCullagh, minister of Bridge URC Church, Otley. Local guest ministers lead the services.

== Recent events ==
On several days between 4 and 12 August 2012 the church celebrated the 150th anniversary of the opening of the present building, plus the 40 years since the congregation joined the United Reformed Church. There was an anniversary meal, a flower festival, a celebration service, and a fly-past by a Spitfire. VIP visitors were Rev Kevin Watson, moderator of the Yorkshire Synod, and Mayor and Mayoress Robert and Sylvia Windass.

The church has a history of supporting various causes including Baby Basics, a charity run by volunteers who assist new mothers. In December 2017 the church's yearly gift service was dedicated to that charity. Donations from the service and profits from the church's coffee shop were donated to Baby Basics.

On 11 August 2019 Rev. Jason McCullagh led a Songs of Praise for the International Gilbert and Sullivan Festival 2019. In September 2019 the finish line of the UCI Road World Championships was placed in front of the west entrance of the church. The building was used for press conferences following each race, and this helped with fundraising for the building. Local businesses were permitted to promote their trade on church land between the building and the finish line. A media team from Calendar filmed a news item there.

The church's Stray View Coffee Shop has supported around 40 charities since opening in 2005. Charities supported by the church include overseas mission charities, and local missions including Harrogate Homesless Project. The church magazine is called The Messenger, published six times per year

== Original 1862 carvings ==
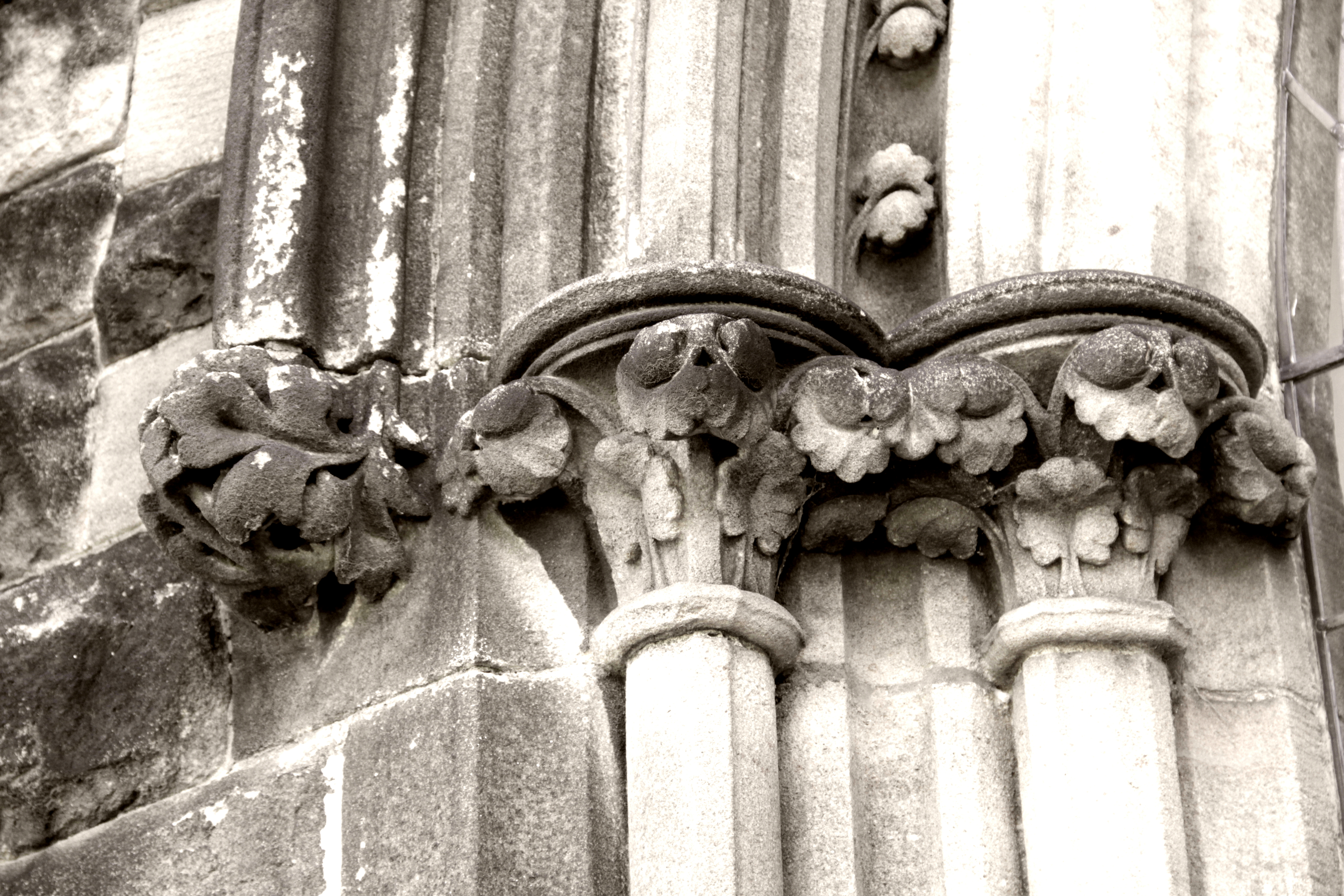
Capitals and label stop by William Ingle

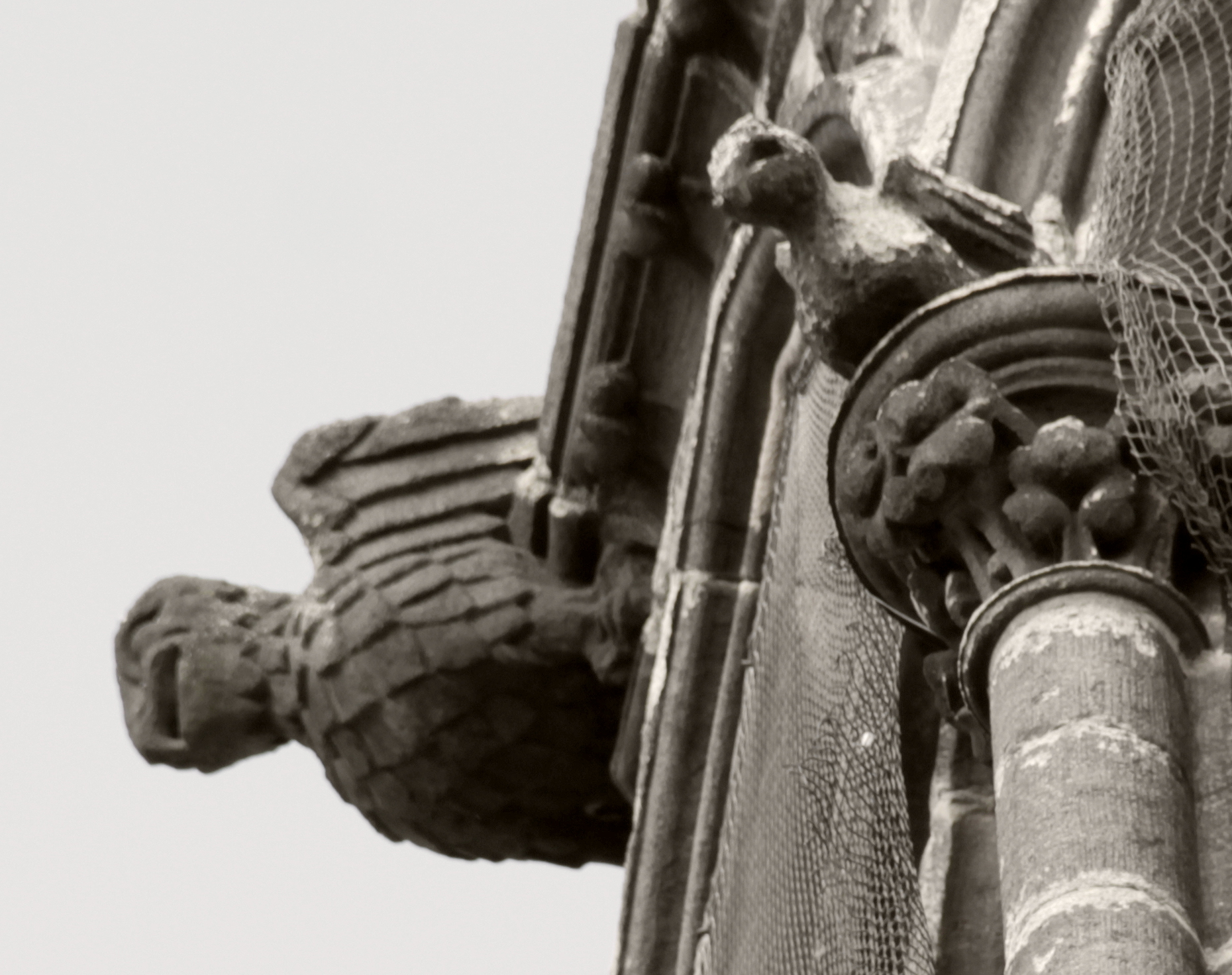
Gargoyle and chick, by William Ingle

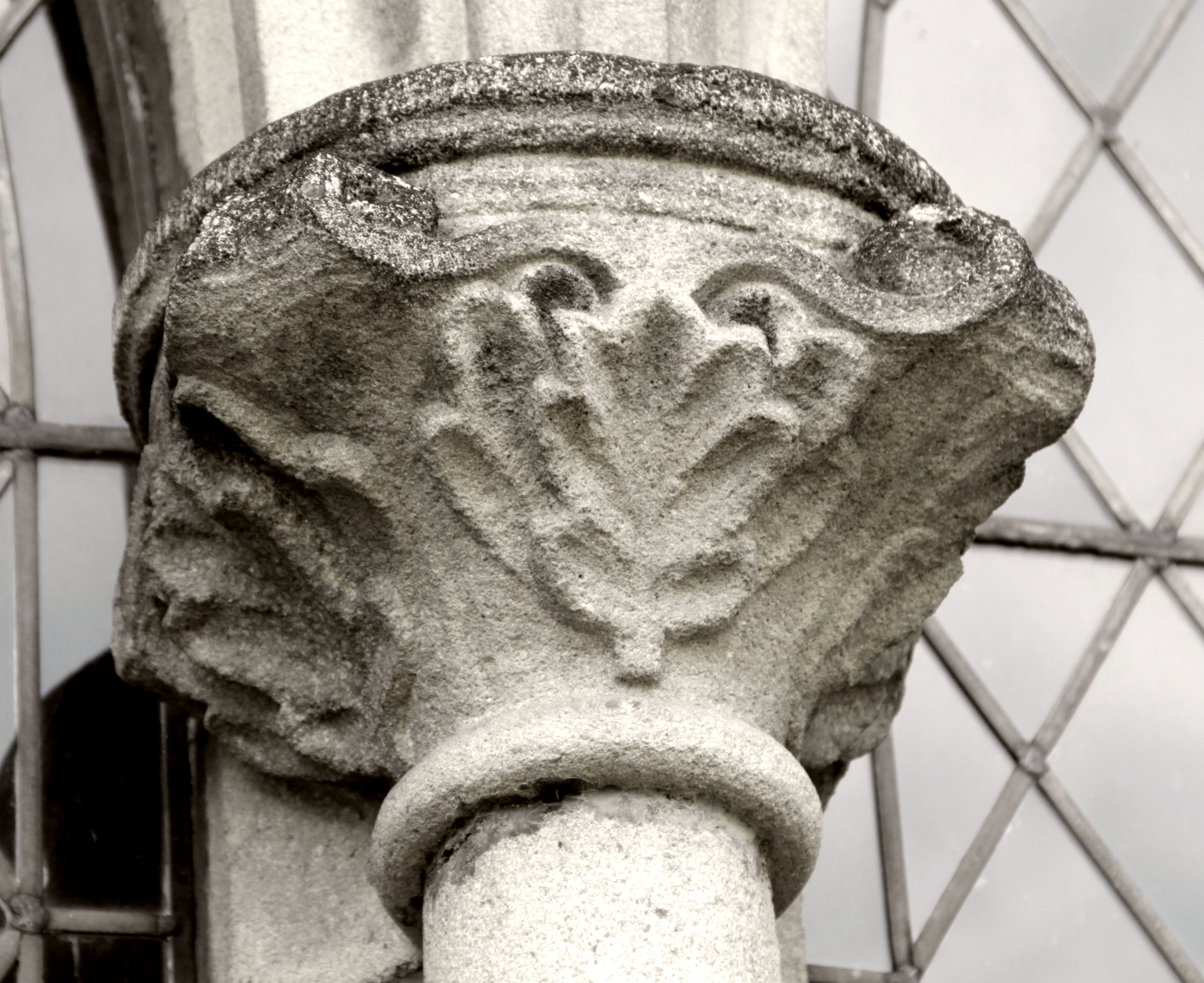
Romanesque capital, by Charles Mawer

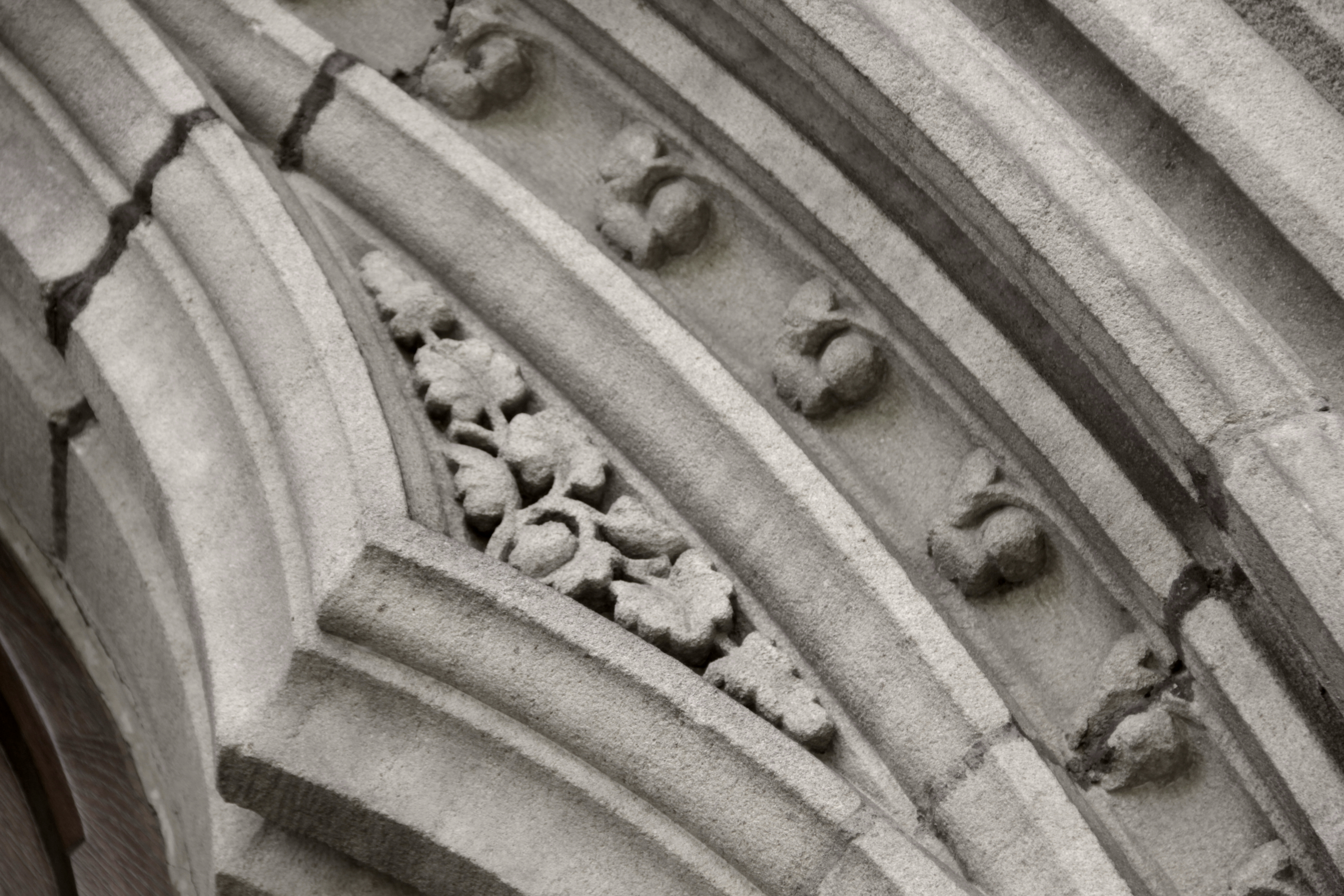
Spandrel, by William Ingle

== See also ==
- Listed buildings in Harrogate (Low Harrogate Ward)
