= Martha Crossley =

- Born: February 3, 1775; Northowram
- Died: May 26, 1854 (aged 79); Dean Clough, Halifax
- Occupation: Carpet manufacturer
- Spouse: John Crossley

Martha Crossley, born Martha Turner (3 February 1775 – 26 May 1854), was a British carpet manufacturer in Halifax.

== Life ==
Martha Crossley was born in Northowram in 1775 at Folly Hall, Ambler Thorn. Her father, John Turner, was a farmer and he was married to Sarah. Her father had been a worsted manufacturer.

She was married on 28 January 1801 to John Crossley, despite her parents' objections. She had other suitors but John pressed his case and showed her the house she would have if they married. She did not like his family but it was agreed that this was not a problem. They had eight children. Her husband worked for a carpet manufacturer and in time he partnered with Robert Abbott and Francis Ellerton to form Abbott Crossley & Co. Her husband's contribution to the business was not capital but expertise. The business continued but her husband started a new business to do the spinning called Crossley, Travis and Crossley; she was involved in finding their building. This business lasted for twenty years and each partner made £1,200 when it was sold up. Martha operated a loom and would get up early to do so. She was keen that the Crossley family should profit-share and that their success should be shared with the poor of Halifax.

Her husband died at the age of 64 at Dean Clough, Halifax, on 17 January 1837.

== Death and legacy ==
Martha died on 26 May 1854 at Dean Clough in Halifax. She and John had three sons, John, Joseph and Frank, who took over the running of the mills after her husband died.

Her gravestone, which had been at Square Chapel, was moved in the 1970s to allow building work. The stone was lost but rediscovered in 2010 at Elland cemetery. The find was timely as a play, "Woven in the Fabric", had been written about Martha's life and was staged in that year at the Halifax Festival.
