= 1872 Northern West Riding of Yorkshire by-election =

UK Parliamentary by-election

The 1872 Northern West Riding of Yorkshire by-election was fought on 3 February 1872. The by-election was fought due to the death of the incumbent MP of the Liberal Party, Sir Francis Crossley. It was won by the Conservative candidate Francis Sharp Powell.
