= Francis Crossley =

British carpet manufacturer, philanthropist and Liberal Party politician

Sir Francis Crossley
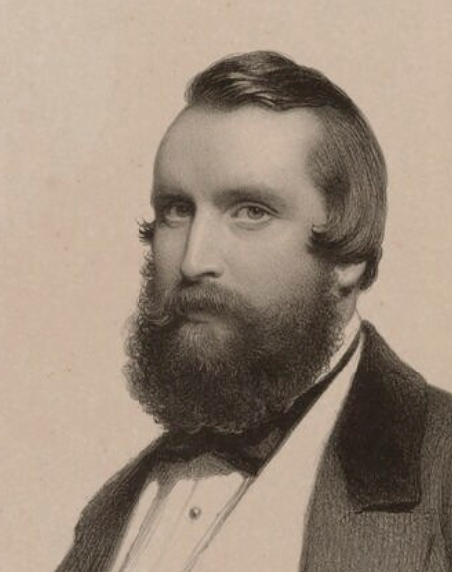
- Francis Crossley by Charles Baugniet, 1856

Member of the British Parliament for Halifax, West Yorkshire

Personal details
- Born: October 26, 1817 Halifax
- Died: January 5, 1872 (aged 54) Bellevue, Hopwood Lane, Halifax
- Resting place: Halifax General Cemetery
- Party: Liberal Party
- Spouse: Martha Eliza Brinton
- Children: Savile Crossley
- Parent(s): John and Martha Crossley
- Occupation: Carpet manufacturer
- Known for: Philanthropy

Sir Francis Crossley, 1st Baronet, of Halifax (Halifax, 26 October 1817 – 5 January 1872), known to his contemporaries as Frank Crossley, was a British carpet manufacturer, philanthropist and Liberal Party politician. He was founder of the company Crossley Carpets.

== Background ==
His parents were Martha (d. 1854) and John Crossley (d. 1837), who was a carpet manufacturer at Dean Clough Mills, Halifax. He was one of eight children. His older brother, John, was also an MP for Halifax, from 1874 to 1877.

== Trade ==
The fifth and youngest son, Francis, was sent to school at Halifax; while still a schoolboy his pocket money was made dependent on his own work. A loom was set up for him in his father's mill, on which he spent the time not spent at school.

The carpet manufactory at Dean Clough was commenced by John Crossley in a small way, but it became, under the management of John Crossley, jun., Joseph Crossley, and Francis Crossley, who constituted the firm of J. Crossley & Sons, the largest concern of its kind in the world. Its buildings covered an area of 20 acres (81,000 m^{2}), and the firm gave employment to between five and six thousand. Its rapid growth was by application of steam power and machinery to the production of carpets. The Crossley firm acquired patents and then devised and patented improvements which placed them in advance of the rest of the trade. One loom, the patent of which became their property, was found capable of weaving about six times as much as could be produced by the old hand loom. Manufacturers of tapestry and Brussels carpets applied to Messrs. Crossley for licences to work their patents, and large sums accrued to them from royalties alone.

In 1864 the concern was changed into a limited liability company, and a portion of the shares in the new company were offered to workers under favourable conditions.

== Politics ==
Crossley was elected in the liberal interest as MP for Halifax, 8 July 1852; he sat for the borough until 1859, when he became the member for the West Riding of Yorkshire. On the division of the riding in 1868 he was returned for the northern division, which he continued to represent to the time of his death.

== Philanthropy ==
His first major gift to Halifax consisted in the erection of twenty-one almshouses in 1855, with an endowment which gave six shillings a week to each person.

On his return from America in 1855 he announced his intention to present the people of Halifax with a park, and on 15 August 1857 this park was opened. It consists of more than 12 acres (49,000 m^{2}) of ground, laid out from designs by Sir Joseph Paxton and Edward Milner. With a sum of money invested for its maintenance in 1867, it cost the donor £41,300.

About 1860, with his brothers John and Joseph, Crossley began the erection of an orphan home and school on Skircoat Moor. This was completed at their sole united cost, and endowed by them with a sum of £3,000 a year; it was designed for the maintenance of children who had lost one or both parents, and had accommodation for four hundred. (It was one of the predecessors of Crossley Heath Grammar School, established 1985.)

In 1864, Messrs. Crossley and Sons gifted £300 to the Royal National Lifeboat Institution (RNLI), for the purchase of a new lifeboat for Redcar Lifeboat Station. The 33 ft (10 m) 'Pulling and Sailing' (P&S) lifeboat, one with both sails and oars, was named Crossley, and served at Redcar until 1867, before being transferred to Middlesbrough, where it remained on station until 1884. In total, the lifeboat was launched nine times, saving 12 lives.

In 1870 he founded a loan fund of £10,000 for the benefit of deserving tradesmen of Halifax, and in the same year presented to the London Missionary Society the sum of £20,000, the largest donation the society had ever received. About the same period he gave £10,000 to the Congregational Pastors' Retiring Fund, and the same sum towards the formation of a fund for the relief of widows of congregational ministers.

== Personal life ==
He married, on 11 December 1845, Martha Eliza, daughter of Henry Brinton of Kidderminster, by whom he had an only son, Savile Crossley, second baronet, MP successively for Lowestoft and for Halifax. He was the author of Canada and the United States, a lecture, 1856. Savile was to become a prominent Liberal Unionist politician and was created Baron Somerleyton in 1916.

Crossley was mayor of Halifax in 1849 and 1850, and purchased Somerleyton Hall in Suffolk in 1862 from Morton Peto.

He was created a baronet on 23 January 1863. After a long illness he died at Bellevue, Halifax, 5 January 1872, and was buried in the general cemetery on 12 January. His will was proved 27 May 1872, when the personalty was sworn under £800,000.

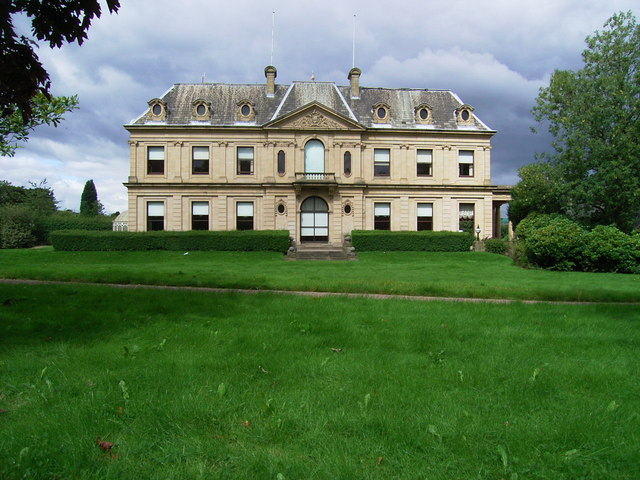
Bellevue, Hopwood Lane, Halifax, built in the 1850s for Francis Crossley

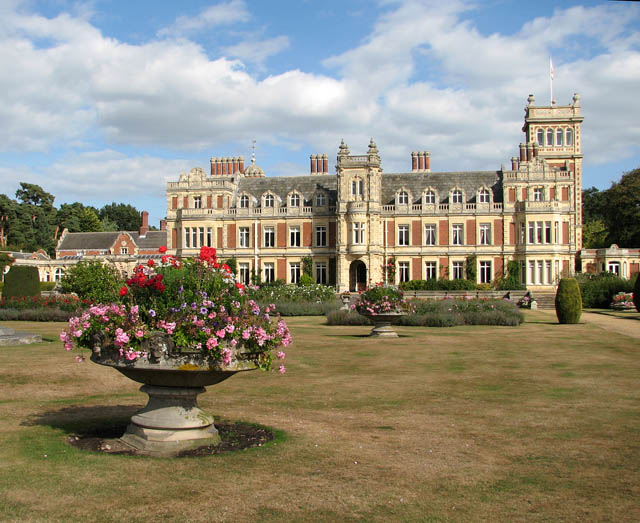
Somerleyton Hall

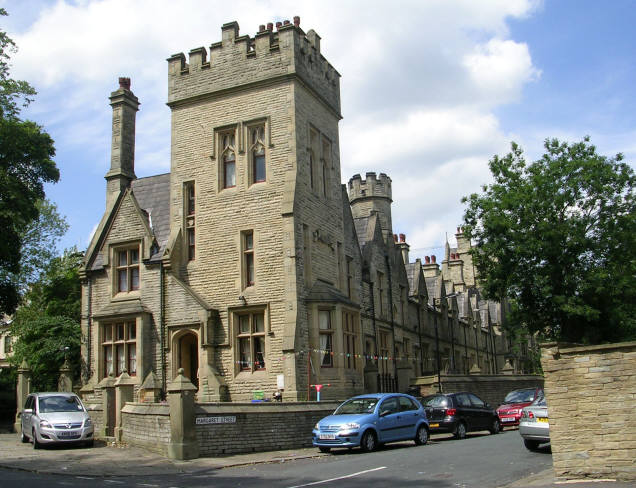
Almshouses (1855) in Halifax, built by Francis Crossley

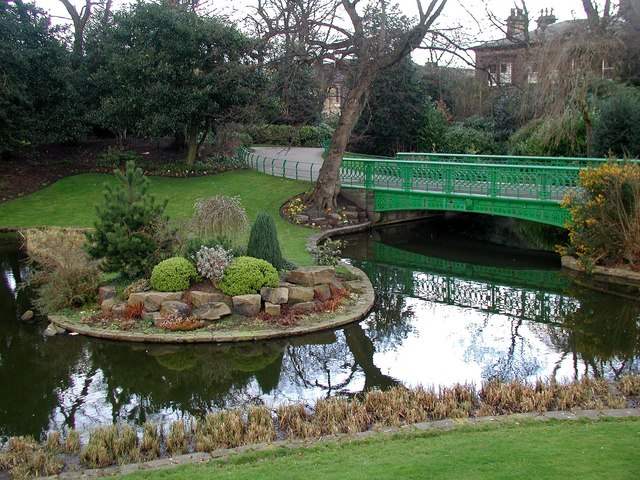
People's Park, Halifax

== Sources ==
- Leigh Rayment's Peerage Pages
- This article incorporates text from a publication now in the public domain: "Crossley, Francis". Dictionary of National Biography. London: Smith, Elder & Co. 1885–1900.

Parliament of the United Kingdom
Preceded by Sir Charles Wood and Henry Edwards	Member of Parliament for Halifax; 1852–1859; With: Sir Charles Wood	Succeeded by Sir Charles Wood and Sir James Stansfeld
Preceded by Edmund Beckett Denison; Sir John Ramsden, Bt	Member of Parliament for West Riding of Yorkshire; 1859–1865; With: Sir John Ramsden, Bt	Constituency abolished
New constituency	Member of Parliament for Northern West Riding of Yorkshire; 1865–1872; With: Lord Frederick Cavendish	Succeeded by Francis Sharp Powell; Lord Frederick Cavendish
Baronetage of the United Kingdom
New creation	Baronet (of Halifax); 1863–1872	Succeeded by Savile Crossley
