= John Crossley =

British politician (1812-1879)

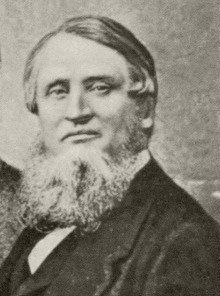
- John Crossley

Member of Parliament for Halifax
- In office 1874–1877

Personal details
- Born: 16 May 1812
- Died: 16 April 1879 (aged 66)
- Party: Liberal
- Parent: Martha Crossley (mother)
- Relatives: Francis Crossley (brother)

John Crossley (16 May 1812 – 16 April 1879) was a Liberal Party politician in the United Kingdom. He served from 1874 to 1877 as MP for Halifax in West Yorkshire.

== Biography ==
He was the eldest son of John Crossley (1772–1837) and his wife Martha Turner. Crossley was a successful carpet manufacturer, whose business (John Crossley and Sons) became a major employer in Halifax. In the early 1870s he set up the American Linoleum Company at Linoleumville, New York with Frederick Walton, the inventor of linoleum; the company was highly successful.

He was the elder brother of Sir Francis Crossley (1817–1872), who had served as the constituency's MP from 1852 to 1859.

== Honours ==
A blue plaque was erected by the Halifax Civic Trust.

Parliament of the United Kingdom
Preceded by Sir James Stansfeld and Edward Akroyd	Member of Parliament for Halifax; 1874–1877; With: Sir James Stansfeld	Succeeded by Sir James Stansfeld and John Dyson Hutchinson
