= Harry Barnes (Liberal politician) =

British politician

- Barnes in 1922

Member of Parliament for Newcastle upon Tyne East
- In office 14 December 1918 – 26 October 1922
- Preceded by: Constituency established
- Succeeded by: Joseph Bell

Personal details
- Born: 5 December 1870
- Died: 12 October 1935 (aged 64)
- Party: Liberal

Major Harry Barnes (5 December 1870 – 12 October 1935) was a radical United Kingdom Liberal Party politician, architect and author specialising in housing and town planning.

He first stood for parliament in 1918 when he was selected as the Liberal candidate for Newcastle upon Tyne East. He had served as a Major in the Northumberland Fusiliers Voluntary Regiment. He had been the District Valuer for Newcastle upon Tyne from 1916 to 1918, so knew the town well. The seat was a newly created constituency and his prospects of winning were helped when no Unionist opponent came forward and he was endorsed by the Coalition Government led by David Lloyd George;

General election 1918: Newcastle upon Tyne East
Party	Candidate	Votes	%	±%
Liberal	Harry Barnes	8,682	58.1	n/a
Labour	Walter Hudson	5,195	34.7	n/a
NFDDSS	John Thompson	1,079	7.2	n/a
Majority		3,487	23.4	n/a
Turnout			48.7	n/a

Despite being elected as a supporter of the government, Barnes resigned the Coalition Liberal Whip in November 1919 to take the opposition Liberal Whip. In parliament Barnes was associated with the more radical wing of the Liberals, due to his support for a number of social reforms. In particular he favoured the introduction of a Capital levy which in 1919 put him at odds with the caretaker Liberal Leader Sir Donald Maclean. Radical Liberals had proposed a Commons motion to introduce a capital levy which MacLean had failed to support. Barnes publicly criticised MacLean at that year's National Liberal Federation conference.

He was strong supporter of Free Trade and served as Honorary secretary of the Cobden Club from 1920 to 1924. At the 1922 election he sought re-election again as the official Liberal candidate. Although he did not have a Unionist opponent, he found he was also opposed by a National Liberal supporter of the recently deposed Prime Minister, Lloyd George. This had the effect of splitting the Liberal vote with unfortunate consequences;

General election 1922: Newcastle upon Tyne East
Party	Candidate	Votes	%	±%
Labour	Joseph Nicholas Bell	10,084	43.1	+8.4
Liberal	Harry Barnes	6,999	30.0	−28.1
National Liberal	Gilbert Stone	6,273	26.9	n/a
Majority		3,085	13.1	36.5
Turnout			73.7	+25.0
Labour gain from Liberal		Swing		

In December 1922 his successful Labour opponent died causing a by-election. He was again selected as the Liberal candidate. By then relations between Lloyd George and Asquith were improving and he faced no National Liberal candidate. However, a Unionist candidate intervened in the by-election with the same effect;

1923 Newcastle-upon-Tyne East by-election
Party	Candidate	Votes	%	±%
Labour	Rt Hon. Arthur Henderson	11,066	45.7	+2.6
Liberal	Harry Barnes	6,682	27.6	−2.4
Unionist	Robert Gee	6,480	26.7	n/a
Majority		4,384	18.1	+5.0
Turnout			76.4	+2.7
Labour hold		Swing	+2.5	

He decided to try his luck elsewhere and stood in Tynemouth at the 1923 general election. Tynemouth had been a Unionist seat since they gained it from the Liberals in 1918. He did well, but not quite well enough;

General election 1923: Tynemouth
Party	Candidate	Votes	%	±%
Unionist	Alexander West Russell	9,612	41.0	−7.1
Liberal	Harry Barnes	9,008	38.3	+9.3
Labour	William Pitt	4,875	20.7	−2.2
Majority		604	2.7	16.4
Turnout			81.1	−2.4
Unionist hold		Swing	-8.2	

He contested Tynemouth again at the 1924 election, but in a difficult year for the Liberal Party his return to parliament was again thwarted;

General election 1924: Tynemouth
Party	Candidate	Votes	%	±%
Unionist	Alexander West Russell	11,210	45.2	+4.2
Liberal	Harry Barnes	6,820	27.4	−10.9
Labour	J. Stuart Barr	6,818	27.4	+6.7
Majority		4,390	17.8	+15.1
Turnout			84.6	+3.5
Unionist hold		Swing	+7.5	

He was also involved in local government politics in London. He served as an Alderman on the London County Council from 1923 to 1925, for the Liberal backed Progressive Party.

In September 1927 Barnes was selected as Liberal prospective parliamentary candidate for the Unionist seat of Warwick and Leamington. However, he was not called upon to contest the seat at an election. In 1928, Barnes instead contested a July by-election in the West Yorkshire seat of Halifax, following the resignation of the Speaker of the House of Commons, John Henry Whitley, who had represented the seat as Liberal since 1900. This seemed to represent his best chance of returning to parliament but he was to be disappointed;

1928 Halifax by-election
Party	Candidate	Votes	%	±%
Labour	Arthur Longbottom	17,536	42.8	n/a
Liberal	Harry Barnes	12,585	30.8	n/a
Unionist	F. S. Crossley	10,804	26.4	n/a
Majority		4,951	12.0	n/a
Turnout		40,925	78.7	n/a
Labour gain from Liberal		Swing	n/a	

He did not stand for Parliament again.

At the 1934 LCC Elections he stood as a Labour candidate at Fulham East and was elected. He served as Chairman of the LCC's Town Planning Committee. However, he served on the LCC for little more than a year before his death.

== Publications ==
He had published a number of publications on social matters;

- Housing, the Facts and the Future, 1923
- The Architect in Practice, 1924
- A National Municipal House Service, 1924
- Rating and Valuation, 1928
- The Slum, its Story and Solution, 1931
- The Rating of Coal Mines, 1933

Parliament of the United Kingdom
New constituency	Member of Parliament for Newcastle upon Tyne East; 1918–1922	Succeeded by Joseph Bell
