= James Tattersall (politician) =

James Tattersall (born 1859) was a British political activist.

Born in Brighouse, then in the West Riding of Yorkshire, Tattersall left school when he was nine, and found work in a silk mill. In 1880, he moved to Halifax to work at Clayton, Murgatroyd and Company, and began studying at night school. He joined a trade union of silk workers in 1884, and in 1889 was a founder of Halifax Trades Council.

Tattersall was at first a supporter of the Liberal Party, serving on the Halifax Liberal Executive. He was a supporter of the Manningham Mills Strike, and this led him to promote the idea of Liberal-Labour candidates. However, the Liberal Party was not receptive to the idea of standing working men in elections. In 1891, Tattersall was a founder of both the Halifax Labour Electoral Association (LEA), and the Halifax Fabian Society. In January 1892 he stood in the Halifax School Board election as an LEA candidate, alongside Albert Thornton. The two topped the poll, winning seats on the board, and this inspired the LEA to found the new Halifax Labour Union, with Tattersall as its president. While he remained on the Liberal Executive until later in the year, he was now strongly opposed to the party, and at the 1892 UK general election, he chaired a meeting in support of Alfred Arnold, the Conservative candidate.

Tattersall was sacked from his job in July 1892, an action generally thought to be in retaliation for his labour activism. This led to large public meetings in his support, although Tattersall personally tried to play down the impact. In November 1892 he stood for Halifax Town Council as a Labour Union candidate in the Northowram ward, and was elected unopposed. The local Conservative and Liberal parties were alarmed by the success of the new group, and the Conservatives approached Tattersall to offer him a place as an alderman. He accepted this, to the dismay of much of the Labour Union.

The Halifax Labour Union became part of the Independent Labour Party (ILP) in 1893, but the small ILP group on Halifax Town Council struggled with disagreements over whether to reorganise the town clerk's office, and John Lister withdrew from the 1894 council election, due to conflicts with Tattersall. Tattersall was the only ILP member to win a seat, although he lost his School Board seat later in the year. The Clarion used this situation to attack the ILP's National Administrative Committee, on which Lister held a seat.

Tattersall now reached the peak of his national prominence, winning election to the ILP's National Administrative Committee in 1894, and at the 1895 UK general election, he was the party's candidate for Preston. Unusually, in Preston, many trade unionists supported the Conservative Party, and Tattersall attempted to court their votes. He spoke against the disestablishment of the Church of England, and in favour compulsory rate contributions to church schools, and for compensation payments to any publicans who lost their licence. During the campaign, he wrote "An appeal to the working men of Halifax", calling for them to vote against the Liberal Party, and by implication, for the Conservative Party. He polled well, but did not win the seat.

Back in Halifax, the Labour Union had become increasingly unhappy with Tattersall's close relationship with the Conservatives, and in November he was expelled from the Union, on a vote of 75 votes to 15. He found work as the full-time election agent for the local Conservative Party, remaining in the post into the 1900s.
