= Halifax Labour Union =

The Halifax Labour Union was an early labour movement organisation in Halifax in England.

The organisation originated as the Halifax branch of the Labour Electoral Association (LEA), formed in mid-1891. It received the support of much of the Halifax Trades Council, which had itself been founded in 1889, and had an initial aim of getting a trade unionist adopted as one of the two Liberal Party candidates for vacancies on the Halifax School Board, but the request was ignored. In November, James Beever, leader of the LEA, was invited to stand as the liberal candidate for the Southowram ward in a council by-election, which was expected to be uncontested. However, other Liberal Party members disagreed with Beever's advocacy of Liberal-Labour candidates, and stood H. E. Greenwood as a rival. Beever decided to stand for the seat as an independent labour candidate, although he was not elected.

Now focused on standing independently, in January 1892, the LEA stood two of its own candidates for the school board: James Tattersall and Albert Thornton. They campaigned for free education and fair wages for school staff, and took the top two places in the poll, winning seats on the board. In April and July, Beever and Tattersall were both sacked by Clayton, Murgatroyd and Company, an action generally thought to be in retaliation for their labour activism. Large public meetings were held in support of the two, and a May Day demonstration attracted 10,000 people. The LEA launched the Halifax Labour Union, with a remit to take on the political work of the trades council, and promote independent labour candidates. The Labour Union also won the support of the Halifax Fabian Society, which had been founded in 1891.

In November 1892, Halifax Town Council was redistricted, leading to all-out elections, and the Labour Union stood six candidates on a platform of building council housing and including fair pay and conditions requirements in council contracts. Beever was elected in Southowram, John Lister in Central, and Thomas Davenport in Pellon, and this representation enabled them to vote Tattersall in as an alderman. Lister, a wealthy barrister, served as treasurer of the Labour Union, and loaned it substantial amounts.

A Parliamentary by-election arose in Halifax early in 1893, and the party decided to stand Lister, on the grounds that he could afford to pay the substantial expenses. They hoped that he might be adopted by the Liberal Party, but William Rawson Shaw was chosen instead, and Lister fought as a Labour Union candidate. He took 25.4% of the vote, but only third place. The campaign further increased support for the organisation, with membership of more than 600 people, and it was able to launch a weekly newspaper, the Labour News.

The Halifax Labour Union was represented at the founding conference of the Independent Labour Party (ILP), in 1893, and it affiliated to the new national party. Throughout the 1890s, it was the ILP's second largest branch, behind only the Bradford Labour Union. It lost its council seats, although some results were close, such as James Parker's 1893 contest in Central ward. It again won one in 1897, increasing this to six by 1903, and seven plus two aldermen by 1913. Lister contested the Parliamentary seat again in the 1895 UK general election, then Tom Mann stood in the 1897 Halifax by-election.
