= Alfred Billson =

Alfred Billson may refer to:

- Alfred Billson (British politician) (1839–1907), British politician
- Alfred Billson (Australian politician) (1858–1930), Australian politician
