= Arthur Longbottom =

Arthur Longbottom may refer to:

- Arthur Longbottom (politician) (1883–1943), British Labour Party politician, Member of Parliament for Halifax 1928–1931
- Arthur Longbottom (footballer) (1933–2023), footballer with Queens Park Rangers
