= Thomas Shaw (Halifax MP) =

English politician

Thomas Shaw (1823 - 15 January 1893) was an English Liberal politician who represented Halifax.

Shaw was born at Green Bank, Holywell Green, Yorkshire the third son of Joseph Shaw who owned the Brookroyd Mills. He was educated at Huddersfield and later became chairman of the family firm, John Shaw & Sons and was President of Halifax Mechanics' Institute. He was Mayor of Halifax from 1866 to 1868. In 1881, when his son came of age, he gave £1,000 to Halifax School Board to promote education in Halifax, which was used to establish the Rawson Shaw Scholarships . He was elected as M.P. for Halifax at a by-election in 1882. He held the seat until his death at the age of 69 in 1893. His son William Rawson Shaw was elected in succession to him.

Shaw married Elizabeth Rawson in Manchester in 1855 and had a son William Rawson.

Parliament of the United Kingdom
Preceded by Sir James Stansfeld and John Dyson Hutchinson	Member of Parliament for Halifax; 1882–1893; With: Sir James Stansfeld	Succeeded by Sir James Stansfeld and William Rawson Shaw
