= 1907 Halifax by-election =

UK parliamentary by-election

The 1907 Halifax by-election was a parliamentary by-election held for the UK House of Commons constituency of Halifax in the West Riding of Yorkshire on 6 March 1907.

== Vacancy ==
Under the provisions of the Succession to the Crown Act 1707 and a number of subsequent Acts, MPs appointed to certain ministerial and legal offices were at this time required to seek re-election. The by-election in Halifax was caused by the appointment of the sitting Liberal MP, John Henry Whitley as a Junior Lord of the Treasury, the formal title given to the government’s junior whips in Parliament.

== Candidates ==
Whitley, who had held the seat since 1900 fought the seat again in the Liberal interest. Halifax was a constituency at that time returning two members and there was recent history of both Liberal Unionist and Labour Party MPs being elected there. However the Unionist members met on 2 March to consider whether or not to run a candidate and decided to do so only if Labour contested the election. Later that day Labour announced they would not oppose Whitley and there being no other nominations, Whitley was therefore returned unopposed on 6 March 1907.

== Result ==
Halifax by-election, 1907
Party	Candidate	Votes	%	±%
Liberal	John Henry Whitley	Unopposed	N/A	N/A
Liberal hold				

== See also ==
- List of United Kingdom by-elections
- United Kingdom by-election records
