= Arthur Pickles =

British politician (1901–1984)

Arthur Pickles OBE JP (23 September 1901 – 3 April 1984) was a British architect and Liberal Party politician who was mayor of Halifax.

== Background ==
Pickles was the eldest son of builder and stonemason Fred Pickles and Margaret Catterall, and the elder brother of Wilfred Pickles, the broadcaster. His grandfather worked on the construction of the Royal Courts of Justice on the Strand in London. He was educated at Parkinson Lane School, Halifax, and then won a scholarship to Rishworth School. In 1924 he married Gladys Crampton. They had one son, who became Judge James Pickles, and four daughters. One daughter, Christine, changed her name to Christina Pickles and became a well-known TV actress, appearing notably in the sitcom Friends and the medical drama St. Elsewhere.

== Professional career ==
Pickles was articled to a local architect. He was later in practice on his own account, despite never having formally trained as an architect. He later became a property developer.

== World War II ==
During the war Pickles became chairman of the Halifax Civil Defence Committee. In 1944 he received the OBE for his work on civil defence.

== Political career ==
In 1932 Pickles was elected as a Liberal to Halifax Town Council representing Warley ward. In 1939 he was appointed a Justice of the Peace. He was President of Halifax Liberal Association. In 1945 he became Chairman of the Halifax Council Housing Committee. As chairman of the housing committee in 1949 he opened its one-thousandth post-war house. In 1949 he was elevated to the position of council Alderman. He was Liberal candidate for the Halifax division of West Yorkshire at the 1950 General Election. Although Halifax had been a Liberal seat up until 1928 at the 1945 General election the Liberal candidate came third. His prospects were damaged by the intervention of a National Liberal candidate. In a difficult election for the Liberals nationally, he could not prevent the fall in the Liberal vote;

General Election 1950: Halifax
Party	Candidate	Votes	%	±%
Labour	Dryden Brook	28,800	47.7	+1.2
Conservative	Charles H. Lucas	20,456	33.9	+7.0
Liberal	Arthur Pickles	9,573	15.8	−10.8
National Liberal	R.H. Blackburn	1,551	2.6	n/a
Majority		8,344	13.8	
Turnout			85.1	
Labour hold		Swing		

He did not stand for parliament again. He instead focused his attention entirely on local politics. In 1951 he became Mayor of Halifax, serving a one-year term. He was also chairman of the youth executive council and during that summer he and the mayoress made a special journey to Aachen to visit a party of young people from Halifax. He continued to sit on Halifax Council until retiring in 1966. He continued as a JP and was chairman of the Halifax Bench till 1972. He also remained chairman of the Disablement Advisory Committee.

He died at his home, The Hill, Warley, on 3 April 1984.
