= 1877 Halifax by-election =

UK parliamentary by-election

The 1877 Halifax by-election was fought on 20 February 1877. The by-election was fought due to the resignation of the incumbent Liberal MP, John Crossley. It was won by the Liberal candidate John Dyson Hutchinson.

1877 Halifax by-election
Party	Candidate	Votes	%	±%
Liberal	John Dyson Hutchinson	5,750	61.3	−12.5
Conservative	Richard Wilson Gamble	3,624	38.7	+12.5
Majority		2,126	22.6	+12.2
Turnout		9,374	79.9	−3.8
Registered electors		11,737		
Liberal hold		Swing	-12.5	
