= 1928 Halifax by-election =

UK parliamentary by-election

John Henry Whitley

Harry Barnes

The 1928 Halifax by-election was a parliamentary by-election held on 13 July 1928 for the British House of Commons constituency of Halifax in the West Riding of Yorkshire.

The seat had become vacant when the constituency's Member of Parliament (MP), John Henry Whitley, the Speaker of the House of Commons since 1921, had resigned his seat due to ill-health. He had been elected as a Liberal Party MP at the 1900 general election, and as speaker had been returned unopposed at the general elections in 1922, 1923 and 1924. The last time that there had been a contested election for the seat was at the 1918 general election, when Whitley had been opposed only by a Socialist Labour Party candidate.

The result of the three-way contest was a victory for the Labour candidate, Arthur Longbottom, who won with a majority of 4,951 over the Liberal Harry Barnes, who had previously been MP for Newcastle upon Tyne East. Longbottom had previously been a councillor in Halifax and served as its mayor in 1923.

== Result ==
Halifax by-election, 1928
Party	Candidate	Votes	%	±%
Labour	Arthur Longbottom	17,536	42.8	New
Liberal	Harry Barnes	12,585	30.8	N/A
Unionist	Francis Savile Crossley	10,804	26.4	New
Majority		4,951	12.0	N/A
Turnout		40,925	78.7	N/A
Labour gain from Speaker		Swing	N/A	

== Aftermath ==
At the following year's general election Longbottom held the seat with an increased majority of 7,063 votes. That contest also saw a new Conservative candidate, Gilbert Gledhill overtake the Liberals and move into second place. In 1931, Gledhill took the seat for the Conservatives, defeating Longbottom by over 20,000 votes.

== See also ==
- Halifax, West Yorkshire
- List of United Kingdom by-elections (1918–1931)
