= 1871 Halifax by-election =

UK Parliamentary by-election

The 1871 Halifax by-election was fought on 13 March 1871. The by-election was caused by the incumbent Liberal MP, James Stansfeld, becoming President of the Poor Law Board. It was retained by James Stansfeld who was unopposed.
