= Linda Riordan =

English Labour Co-op politician

Member of Parliament for Halifax
- In office 5 May 2005 – 30 March 2015
- Preceded by: Alice Mahon
- Succeeded by: Holly Lynch

Personal details
- Born: Linda June Haigh; 31 May 1953 (age 73) Halifax, West Riding of Yorkshire, England
- Party: Labour Co-operative
- Spouse: Alan Riordan (died 2007)
- Education: University of Bradford

Linda June Riordan (née Haigh; 31 May 1953) is an English Labour Co-operative politician who was the Member of Parliament (MP) for Halifax from the 2005 general election until standing down in 2015.

== Early life ==
Riordan was born in Halifax and graduated from the University of Bradford. She served as a Calderdale councillor for eleven years, representing the Ovenden ward from 1995 to 2006, when she stood down to devote herself full-time to her role as an MP. She worked as private secretary for her predecessor as Halifax's Labour MP Alice Mahon between 2001 and 2005, and was active in the local Co-operative Party as secretary and treasurer. She was chosen as the Labour candidate from an all-women shortlist but her candidacy was at first opposed by the Party's ruling National Executive Committee owing to concerns about selection process. She was later allowed to stand.

== Parliamentary career ==
Riordan was elected in 2005 and returned to Parliament with a reduced majority in 2010.

She served on various select committees including the Justice Committee, the Procedure Committee, the Environmental Audit Select Committee, the European Scrutiny Committee and the all-Party Crossrail Committee. She was one of 16 signatories of an open letter to Ed Miliband in January 2015 calling on the party to commit to oppose further austerity, take rail franchises back into public ownership and strengthen collective bargaining arrangements In February 2015 she announced that she would be standing down at the general election in May, citing ill health.

== Expenses ==
In December 2010 it was revealed that Riordan had secretly repaid £105.86 in wrongly claimed expenses. The repayment came about after Riordan had used House of Commons stationery for party political purposes. Riordan apologised, blaming volunteers for the incident.

In October 2012, the Speaker of the House of Commons, John Bercow, blocked the release of data showing which MPs were letting their homes to other MPs for financial gain. However, a study of parliamentary records was published in The Daily Telegraph. This article listed problematic expense claims by Riordan and 26 other MPs, and said that she received rental income from a flat she owned in London which was rented out through an agency to fellow Labour MP Iain McKenzie and was, at the same time, able to claim expenses on another flat she rented in the city under an arrangement allowed by IPSA rules. Riordan, along with other MPs, said that under new rules she was banned from receiving mortgage interest expenses by IPSA and, as a result, had been forced to let the property.

Days after the report, Riordan put the flat on the market, having previously tried to sell the flat in 2010. She pledged to ensure that any profit she gained from the sale would be paid back to the taxpayer.

== Personal life ==
She was married to Alan Riordan from 1979 until his death in April 2007, aged 65, of chronic obstructive pulmonary disease.

Parliament of the United Kingdom
Preceded by Alice Mahon	Member of Parliament for Halifax; 2005–2015	Succeeded by Holly Lynch
