= Holly Lynch =

British Labour politician

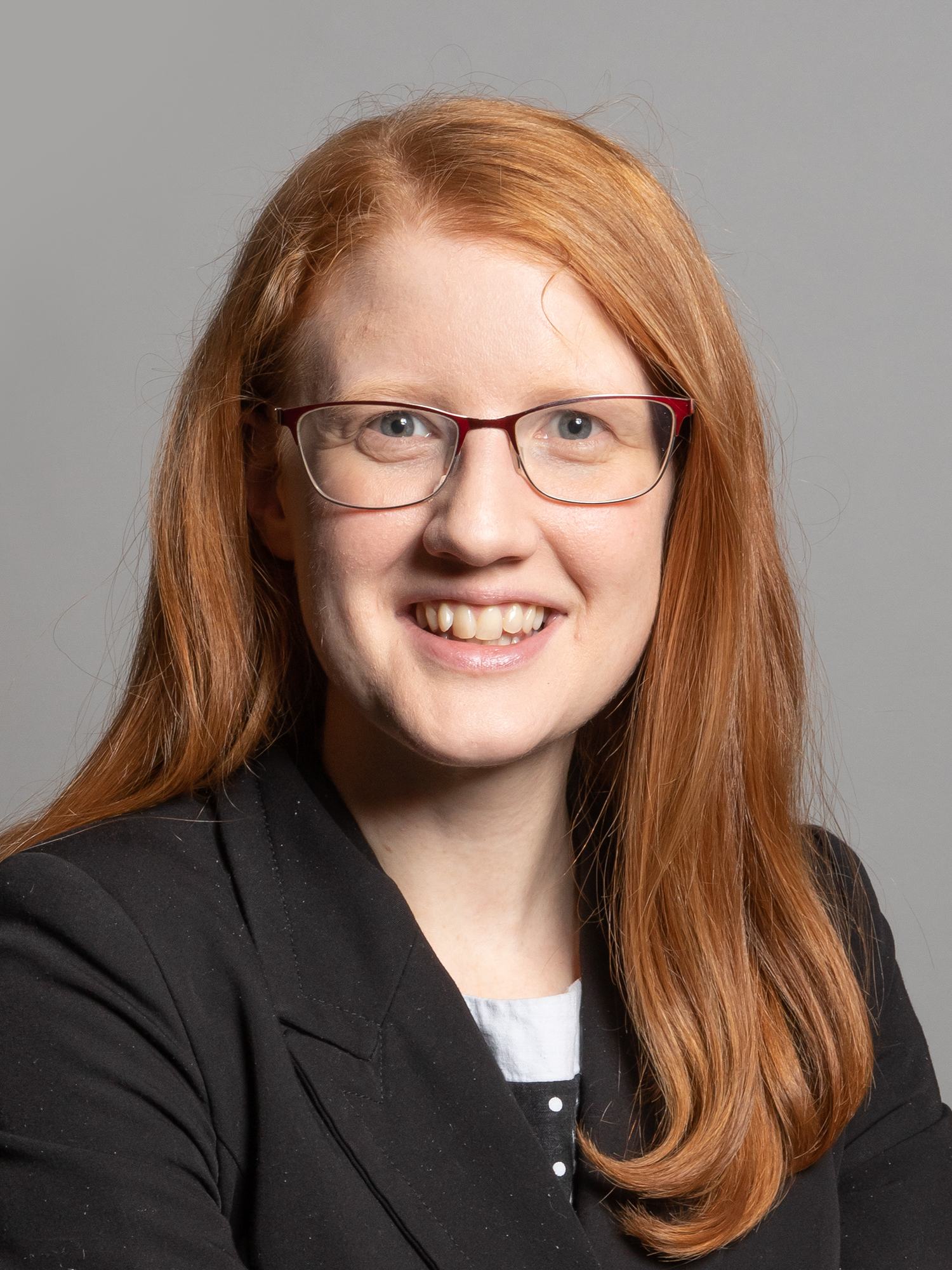
- Official portrait, 2020

Member of Parliament for Halifax
- In office 7 May 2015 – 30 May 2024
- Preceded by: Linda Riordan
- Succeeded by: Kate Dearden

Personal details
- Born: 8 October 1986 (age 39) Halifax, West Yorkshire, England
- Party: Labour
- Education: Lancaster University (BA)

Holly Lynch (born 8 October 1986), also known as Holly Walker-Lynch, is a British Labour Party politician who served as Member of Parliament (MP) for Halifax from 2015 to 2024.

== Early life ==
Lynch was born in Halifax, Calderdale, West Yorkshire and grew up in Northowram. Her mother was a nurse, and her father a police sergeant. She attended Brighouse High School and was awarded a Bachelor of Arts in Politics and History from Lancaster University.

Lynch worked in a fast food outlet in Halifax town centre and a chemist in Savile Park before joining a small business involved in exporting goods from Halifax. She also worked for Linda McAvan MEP in her constituency office.

== Political career ==
Lynch was given just over six weeks to retain the marginal seat of Halifax for Labour having been selected as the party's candidate only at the end of March 2015. Labour's search for a new candidate was triggered by the decision of sitting MP Linda Riordan in February to stand down on health grounds. Her decision, and Lynch's subsequent selection, set up one of the most closely fought contests in Yorkshire in the election. Riordan had held Halifax for Labour in 2010 by a majority of just 1,472 votes, and the seat was considered a key target for the Conservative Party. Lynch was successful on election night and held the Halifax seat for Labour with a majority of only 428 votes over the Conservative candidate.

Lynch made her maiden speech in the House of Commons on 9 June 2015. She stated her priorities as being human rights, the UK's relations with Europe and the protection of services at Calderdale Royal Hospital.

In the 2017 general election, Lynch increased her majority to 5,376 (11.1% of those voting) over the Conservative candidate, Chris Pearson.

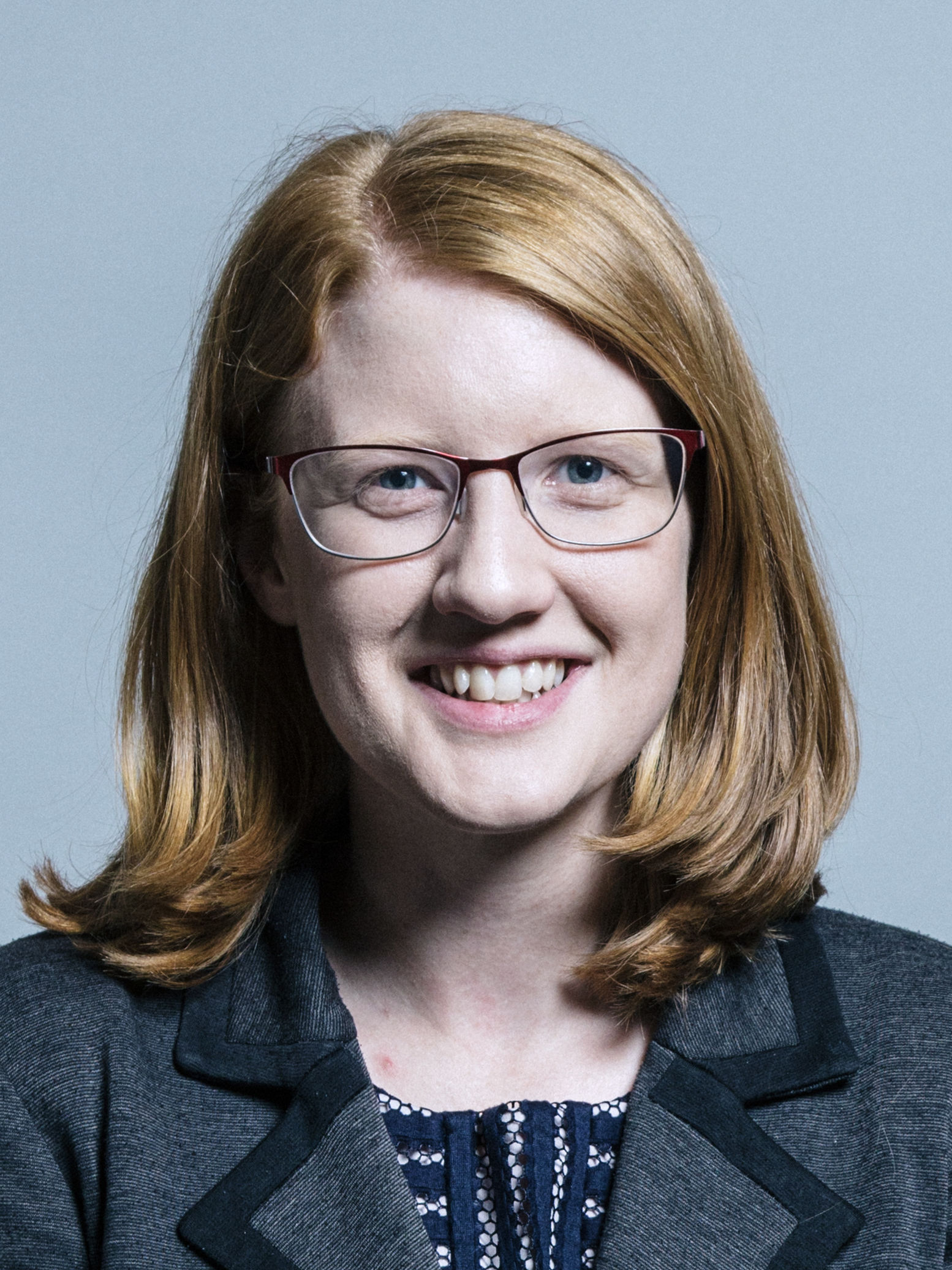
Lynch in 2017

Lynch was a member of the Environmental Audit Committee from July to October 2015 and was appointed to the Procedure Committee in February 2016. Lynch was appointed as an Opposition Whip in the Commons on 18 September 2015. Lynch is the chair of the All-Party Parliamentary Group on Fairtrade and a Co-Chair of the British Museum group and of the Population, Development and Reproductive Health group. Lynch has also been a member of All-Party Parliamentary Groups on Migration, Art and Health, Kashmir, Policing and Rugby Union.

She supported Owen Smith in his attempt to replace Jeremy Corbyn in the 2016 Labour leadership election.

Following the October Shadow Cabinet reshuffle and the firing of Dame Rosie Winterton as Chief Whip, Lynch resigned as a whip. She was reappointed to the front bench by Labour leader Jeremy Corbyn on 3 July 2017, taking on the role of Shadow Flooding & Coastal Communities Minister within the Environment, Food and Rural Affairs team.

In 2018, Lynch led the Protect the Protectors campaign to secure harsher sentences for people convicted of assaulting emergency service workers. In the House of Commons chamber, she spoke about the experience of her parents, both of whom were emergency service workers who had faced violence whilst on the job. She also spoke about her experience shadowing a police constable from the West Yorkshire Police when he was involved in an altercation when attempting to make an arrest. Following this, she sponsored the Assaults on Emergency Workers (Offences) Bill, alongside colleague Chris Bryant, which became law in September 2018.

In the 2019 general election, Lynch was re-elected to the Halifax constituency with 21,496 votes out of 46,458 cast, and a majority of 2,569.

Lynch endorsed Keir Starmer in the 2020 Labour Party leadership election, and was appointed as the Shadow Minister for Immigration following his victory in April 2020. She held this position until the minor reshuffle in May 2021, when she swapped roles with Bambos Charalambous to become the Shadow Minister for Crime Reduction and Courts.

In the November 2021 British shadow cabinet reshuffle she was made Shadow Minister for Security. She focused on issues such Boris Johnson's relationship with Alexander Lebedev, hostile state threats, Martyn's Law and the effectiveness of the Criminal Injuries Compensation Authority (CICA). She also led the Labour Party's scrutiny of the National Security Bill from its introduction to Parliament in May 2022 to it becoming law in July 2023.

In the 2023 British shadow cabinet reshuffle she was appointed Opposition Deputy Chief Whip in the House of Commons, with responsibility for legislation.

Lynch announced in May 2024 that she would step down from Parliament at the forthcoming general election.

== Personal life ==
Lynch married Chris Walker in December 2014. She is a former rugby union player for both Lancaster University and the Halifax Vandals.

Parliament of the United Kingdom
Preceded by Linda Riordan	Member of Parliament for Halifax; 2015–2024	Succeeded by Kate Dearden
Political offices
Preceded by Sue Hayman	Shadow Minister for Flooding and Coastal Communities; 2017–2018	Succeeded by Luke Pollard
Preceded by Bell Ribeiro-Addy	Shadow Minister for Immigration; 2020–2021	Succeeded by Bambos Charalambous
Preceded by Bambos Charalambous	Shadow Minister for Crime Reduction and Courts; 2021	Succeeded by Naz Shah
Preceded by Conor McGinn	Shadow Minister for Security; 2021–2023	Succeeded by Dan Jarvis
Preceded by Lilian Greenwood	Opposition Deputy Chief Whip in the House of Commons; 2023–2024; Served alongside: Mark Tami	Succeeded by Gagan Mohindra; Joy Morrissey
