= Shirley Summerskill =

British politician

The Honourable Shirley Summerskill

Under-Secretary of State for Home Affairs
- In office 8 March 1974 – 7 May 1979
- Prime Minister: Harold Wilson; James Callaghan
- Preceded by: David Lane
- Succeeded by: Lord Belstead

Member of Parliament for Halifax
- In office 15 October 1964 – 8 June 1983
- Preceded by: Maurice Macmillan
- Succeeded by: Roy Galley

Personal details
- Born: Shirley Catherine Wynne Summerskill; 9 September 1931 (age 95)
- Party: Labour
- Spouse: John Ryman (m. 1957; div. 1971)
- Parent(s): Jeffrey Samuel; Edith Summerskill
- Relatives: Ben Summerskill (nephew)
- Education: Somerville College, Oxford

Shirley Catherine Wynne Summerskill (born 9 September 1931) is a British Labour Party politician and former government minister, who served as the Member of Parliament for Halifax from 1964 to 1983.

== Early life ==
Summerskill was born in London, the daughter of Dr E. Jeffrey Samuel and Edith Summerskill, the latter of whom became a Labour MP and a minister in Clement Attlee's government. Summerskill was educated at St Paul's Girls' School and Somerville College, Oxford, and trained as a doctor at St. Thomas's Hospital. She was a member of the executives of the Socialist Medical Association and of the Medical Practitioners' Union. In the 1950s, Edith wrote a series of letters to her young daughter Shirley, Letters to My Daughter (1957), primarily concerned with their shared interest in women's rights.

== Parliamentary career ==
After unsuccessfully contesting the 1962 Blackpool North by-election, Summerskill was elected as Member of Parliament for Halifax in the 1964 general election. After being a Labour shadow minister for Health from 1970 to 1974, she served as a junior minister in the Home Office throughout the 1974–79 Labour government, under two Home Secretaries, Roy Jenkins and Merlyn Rees. In 1980, she was interviewed by the BBC's Panorama current affairs programme about Britain's preparations for a nuclear attack.

When Labour returned to opposition after the Conservative victory at the 1979 general election, Summerskill became an opposition spokesperson on Home Affairs. She lost her seat at the 1983 general election to the Conservative Roy Galley.

== Outside Parliament ==
Summerskill authored two novels, A Surgical Affair (1963) and Destined to Love (1986). In Who's Who, she listed her recreations as music, reading and attending literature classes. She was Medical Officer for the Blood Transfusion Service from 1983 to 1991.

== Personal life ==
Sumerskill married lawyer and future Labour MP John Ryman in 1957; they divorced in 1971.

Her nephew, Ben Summerskill, was chief executive of the UK gay equality charity Stonewall from 2003 to 2014.

Parliament of the United Kingdom
Preceded by Maurice Macmillan	Member of Parliament for Halifax; 1964–1983	Succeeded by Roy Galley
