= James Pickles =

English barrister and judge (1925–2010)

James Pickles (18 March 1925 – 18 December 2010) was an English barrister and circuit judge and who later became a tabloid newspaper columnist. He became known for his controversial sentencing decisions and press statements. His obituaries variously described him as forthright, colourful, and outspoken.

== Early life ==
Pickles was born in Halifax, West Yorkshire. His father, Arthur Pickles, was an architect and surveyor who became a property developer, and later a Liberal member of Halifax Town Council and ultimately Mayor of Halifax. His father's family were also involved in building and masonry: his great-grandfather worked on the construction of the Royal Courts of Justice on the Strand in London. His uncle was the radio presenter Wilfred Pickles.

James' sister, Christina Pickles, is an actress, most famous for her role as a nurse in the hospital drama St. Elsewhere and for playing Judy Geller, the mother of Ross and Monica in the American sitcom Friends, both of which won her Emmy nominations.

Pickles suffered a severe burn to his right hand when young, and learned to write and play tennis and squash with his left hand. He was educated at local primary schools, a prep school and then at Worksop College in Nottinghamshire. His hand injury made him exempt from military service in the Second World War, and he read law at Leeds University and Christ Church, Oxford. He graduated in the second class in 1947, Pickles was called to the bar at the Inner Temple in 1948.

== Legal and political career ==
Pickles practised as a barrister in Bradford, Yorkshire, from 1949 to 1976, originally in the chambers headed by Joseph Stanley Snowden. He became head of chambers in 1972, but his applications for appointment as Queen's Counsel were rejected.

He also dabbled in politics. He was a Labour member of Brighouse Borough Council from 1956 to 1962, and stood for election to Parliament in Yorkshire seats twice. He sought the Labour Party's endorsement for Barkston Ash in the 1959 general election but was not selected; Robert W. Bowes was selected and lost. Pickles then came third as the Liberal candidate for Brighouse and Spenborough at the 1964 general election.

== Judicial career ==
Pickles served as an assistant recorder of the Crown Court from 1963, and then served as a Recorder of Bradford from 1972 to 1976, when he was appointed Circuit Judge on the north eastern circuit. His career as a judge was controversial, and some of his judgments made headline news, resulting in calls for judges to be held more accountable.

He came to public attention in 1985 when he wrote an article that was published in The Daily Telegraph criticising the Conservative government's policy of widening probation, insisting that imprisonment was necessary to deter offenders. His statements to the press breached the voluntary rules established by Lord Kilmuir in the 1950s that restricted press statements to senior judges. He publicly criticised the Lord Chancellor Lord Hailsham as "a brooding quixotic dictator". Hailsham retaliated that Pickles was "a sort of anti-Judge who does all the things that a Judge ought not to do". The Kilmuir rules were abolished when Lord Mackay became Lord Chancellor in October 1987. There was speculation that Pickles would be dismissed in 1989, after he spoke to the press about a case he had heard which was subject to appeal, but instead he was given a "serious rebuke".

Among his most controversial sentencing decisions was a case in early 1989 in which he sentenced a man to a period of probation after he was convicted of sexually assaulting a six-year-old girl. Later that year, he jailed a woman for seven days for contempt of court when she refused to give evidence against her ex-boyfriend, who had assaulted her – she was later freed by the Court of Appeal. In early 1990, he imprisoned a 19-year-old single mother for six months on a charge of theft for letting her friends take goods from the shop at which she worked; the sentence was replaced by a period of probation on appeal.

Pickles was a vocal proponent of the legalisation of cannabis, and also advocated the legalization of prostitution.

== Television and writing ==
Outside the law, Pickles enjoyed writing, particularly writing plays. He was a member of Halifax Thespians and Halifax Authors' Circle. In addition to tabloid journalism in The Sun and the Daily Sport, he also wrote several books, including two memoirs Straight from the Bench (1987) and Judge for Yourself (1992) and a novel Off the Record (1993). He also wrote many plays, some of which were aired on BBC Radio.

Pickles appeared as a guest on Have I Got News for You in 1994, sparring with Ian Hislop. When Hislop told him it was a pleasure to be sitting opposite a judge, Pickles replied: "It's a great pleasure to be sitting opposite someone who should be in the dock."

Pickles also appeared in an episode of Da Ali G Show, and the Channel 5 programme The People vs. Jerry Sadowitz.

== Personal life and death ==
Pickles married Sheila Ratcliffe in August 1948. They had two sons, Roger and Simon Pickles, and a daughter, Carolyn Pickles, who became an actress, appearing on television in Emmerdale. His wife died in 1995, and he was survived by his three children.

James Pickles died on 18 December 2010, aged 85.
