= Roy Galley =

British politician

Member of Parliament for Halifax
- In office 1983–1987

Chair of East Sussex County Council
- Incumbent
- Assumed office 7 May 2024

Councillor for Maresfield And Buxted
- Incumbent
- Assumed office 2 May 2013

Personal details
- Born: 8 December 1947 (age 78)

Roy Galley (born 8 December 1947) is a British Conservative Party politician. He served as MP for Halifax from 1983 to 1987.

== Early life ==
Galley was educated at King Edward VII School, Sheffield followed by Worcester College, Oxford.

== Political career ==
Having stood unsuccessfully for Dewsbury in 1979, he was elected as Member of Parliament for Halifax in the 1983 general election. He ousted from Westminster the re-selected Labour candidate, Dr Shirley Summerskill. As in many seats the win, by 1,869 votes, 3.4%, was due a swing from Labour to the SDP, and when that vote fell in the 1987 general election, he was defeated by Labour's Alice Mahon.

Whilst in Parliament, he served as the Secretary of the Conservative Backbench Health Committee and a member of the Social Services Select Committee. He also introduced a private member's Bill on Local Government to restrict the ability of local authorities to increase local taxes by more than the rate of inflation.

== After Parliament ==
After losing the 1987 election, he returned to Royal Mail where he held a series of senior management jobs. From 1994 to 1996, he was Director of Restructuring for Royal Mail London when he implemented a plan to close 4 Mail centres in order to improve operational efficiency and introduce new working practices. In 1998 he was appointed as Head of Strategic Planning for Post Office Group Property. In 2006 he retired from Royal Mail.

He was Chairman of Kingston & Esher Health Authority, then Kingston & Richmond Health Authority from 1989 to 1998. He was also Chairman of the Kingston & St. George's College of Health Studies from 1993 to 1996.

In 2007 he was elected a member of Wealden District Council, East Sussex. He co-led on its Planning and Development policy and oversight from 2008 to 2013, followed by Economic Development and Regeneration.

In 2013 he was elected as a member of East Sussex County Council and sits on a range of committees. In the May 2026 local elections, he lost his council seat to the Greens by 2 votes.

== Notes ==
Parliament of the United Kingdom
Preceded by Dr Shirley Summerskill	Member of Parliament for Halifax; 1983–1987	Succeeded by Alice Mahon
