= Kate Dearden =

British politician (born 1994)

Kate Dearden MP
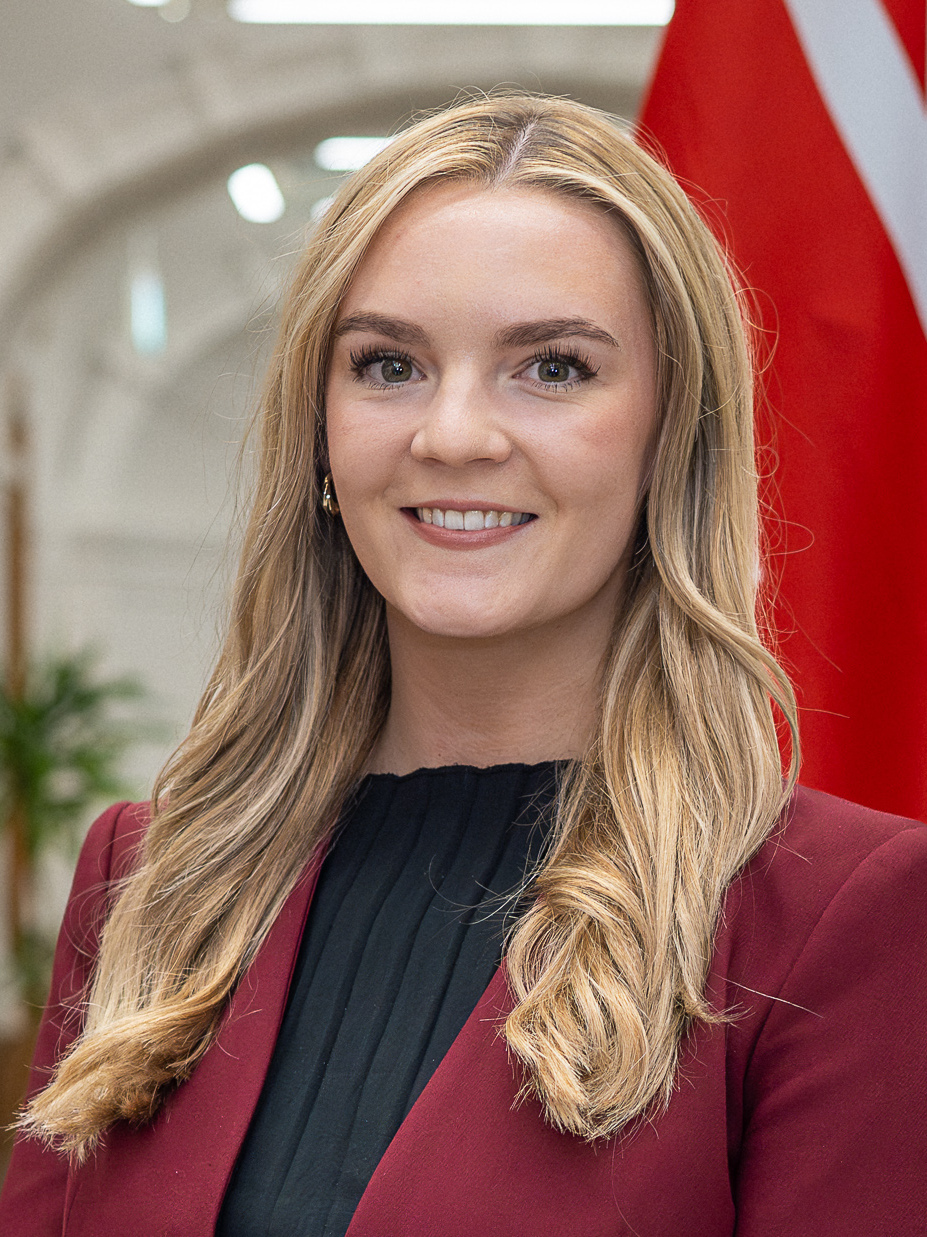
- Official portrait, 2025

Minister of State for the Future of Work
- Incumbent
- Assumed office 21 July 2026
- Prime Minister: Andy Burnham
- Preceded by: Office established

Parliamentary Under-Secretary of State for Employment Rights and Consumer Protection
- In office 7 September 2025 – 21 July 2026
- Prime Minister: Keir Starmer
- Preceded by: Justin Madders
- Succeeded by: Herself as Minister of State

Assistant Government Whip
- In office 18 July 2024 – 7 September 2025
- Prime Minister: Keir Starmer

Member of Parliament for Halifax
- Incumbent
- Assumed office 4 July 2024
- Preceded by: Holly Lynch
- Majority: 6,269 (15.5%)

Personal details
- Born: Kate Alexandra Dearden; April 1994 (age 32) Bingley, West Yorkshire, England
- Party: Labour Co-op
- Education: University of Edinburgh (MA)

Kate Dearden (born April 1994) is an English Labour and Co-operative politician who has served as Member of Parliament for Halifax since 2024. She previously worked for trade union Community.

== Early life and career ==
Dearden was born and raised in Bingley, West Yorkshire, and attended St Bede’s and St Joseph’s Catholic College in Bradford. She studied for MA (Hons) International Relations at the University of Edinburgh, where she was Chair of Edinburgh Labour Students and campaigned for equal marriage in Scotland.

During her third year at university, Dearden worked as a Campaign Organiser for Ian Murray MP, before working for Kezia Dugdale MSP (then leader of Scottish Labour and Member of Scottish Parliament for Lothian) in her fourth year.

After graduating, Dearden served as Chair of the National Labour Students Committee until June 2017, having begun working as a Campaigns Officer for the Labour Party in April. Whilst Chair of the Labour Students, Dearden launched training against antisemitism at the Oxford University Labour Club.

Dearden worked for Community Union from 2017–2024. Beginning as a Research and Campaigns Officer in October 2017, Dearden was then promoted to be Head of Research, Policy & External Relations in January 2020.

== Parliamentary career ==
Dearden attempted to stand as a candidate in the 2022 Wakefield by-election, but was not selected.

Dearden was elected as Member of Parliament for Halifax in the 2024 United Kingdom general election, succeeding the former Labour MP for Halifax, Holly Lynch, who stood down. Dearden was appointed Assistant Whip, House of Commons on 18 July 2024.

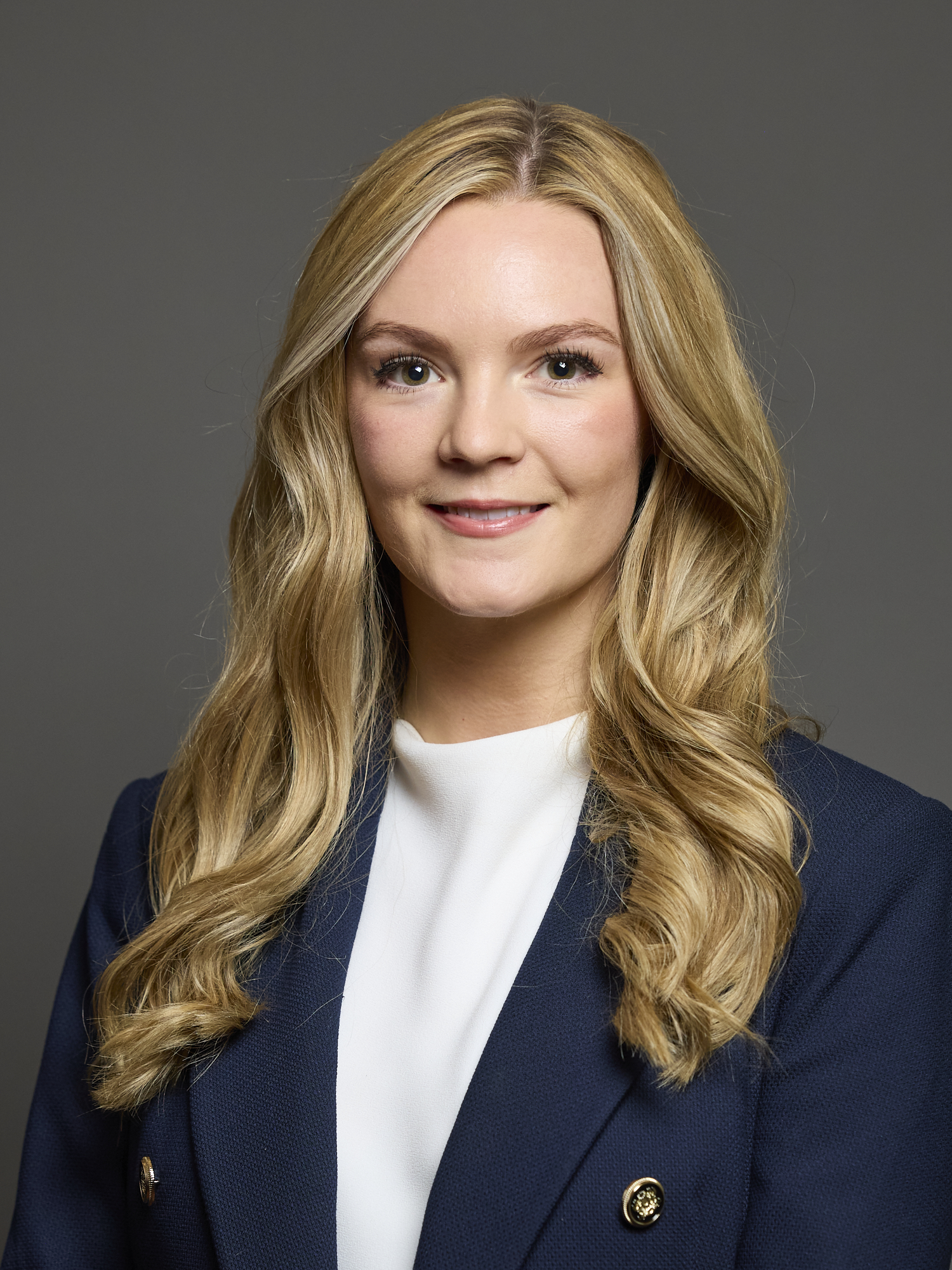
2024 MP portrait of Kate Dearden

From 2025, she has offered cost of living advice surgeries to her constituents. She has advocated for a review of fireworks law in the United Kingdom.

In July 2026, she was appointed to the new government as Minister of State at the Department for Business, Innovation, Science and Trade by Andy Burnham. She confirmed following her appointment that she will serve as Minister of State for the Future of Work.

Parliament of the United Kingdom
Preceded by Holly Lynch	Member of Parliament for Halifax; 2024–present	Incumbent
