= Percival Nathan Whitley =

English cotton spinner & educationist (1893-1956)

Percival Nathan Whitley (1893–1956), eldest son of J. H. Whitley, was a cotton spinner and educationist.

== Early life and education ==
Born 1893 in Halifax, Yorkshire, the eldest child of John and Margherita Whitley. Percival was educated at Rugby and New College, Oxford.

== Career ==
Percival was in the BEF during World War I and participated in the attack on Salonika.

Like his grandfather he went into local politics, working mostly in the Education sector. He is credited with starting vocational education in Calderdale.

He was Mayor of Halifax during World War II between 1941 and 1942 and his sister, Margaret Phyllis, was Mayoress.

He took over the family Cotton Spinning business, S. Whitley and Son, up to his death.

== Later life ==
Percival died, unmarried, in 1956 and is buried in the family plot, 456, in Lister Lane Cemetery.
