= Alice Mahon =

British politician (1937–2022)

- Official portrait, 2005

Member of Parliament for Halifax
- In office 11 June 1987 – 11 April 2005
- Preceded by: Roy Galley
- Succeeded by: Linda Riordan

Personal details
- Born: Alice Bottomley; 28 September 1937 Halifax, England
- Died: 25 December 2022 (aged 85) Halifax, England
- Party: Labour (until 2009; after 2015)
- Spouses: John Gledhill (div. 1972); Tony Mahon (died 2022)
- Children: 3
- Education: University of Bradford (BA)

Alice Mahon (née Bottomley; 28 September 1937 – 25 December 2022) was a British trade unionist and Labour politician who served as Member of Parliament (MP) for Halifax from 1987 until 2005.

Mahon was a left-winger who was a member of the Socialist Campaign Group and was a Eurosceptic, and a frequent rebel against Labour's Blair government. She left the House of Commons in 2005 and resigned from the Labour Party in 2009, expressing objections to the party's political positions and internal operations. However, she rejoined the party in 2015 in support of Jeremy Corbyn's election as leader.

== Early life and career ==
Born Alice Bottomley at 17 New Bond Street, Halifax, she attended grammar school in Halifax and worked in the National Health Service as a nursing auxiliary for ten years. In 1979, she gained a BA in Social Policy from the University of Bradford and taught Trade Union Studies at Bradford College from 1979 to 1987. Meanwhile, she was a councillor on Calderdale Council.

== Parliamentary career ==
Mahon was first elected for the Halifax constituency at the 1987 general election. In 1994, commenting on Tony Blair, Mahon told Chris Mullin that she was "in the Stop Blair camp" of the party.

She opposed the missile defence plans during her period in the House of Commons and sought to protect benefits for parents, women's rights (particularly regarding abortion), and gay rights. Mahon was also a supporter of reform of the House of Lords. She was opposed to the Iraq War, speaking in 2004 of the "cruel barbarism that has been inflicted upon Iraq". She told the 2003 Labour Party Conference, "we were lied to about WMD and there is no delicate way of putting it".

In a July 2003 Commons debate, she queried the support of John Reid, then the Secretary of State for Health for Foundation Hospitals: "How can the Secretary of State stand there as a Scottish MP who is not going to have one of these divisive hospitals, and yet is voting to inflict them on the people of Halifax?" In a version of Tam Dalyell's West Lothian question, the government in the subsequent parliamentary division would have lost the vote without the support of Scottish and Welsh Labour MPs. Labour's majority of 164 was reduced to 17 because of votes against the motion and abstentions. "As English MPs, we have to settle this question of Scots and Welsh MPs voting for things they're not going to have", Mahon said at the time.

== Later life ==
=== Fallujah ===
In November 2005, a film documentary by Sigfrido Ranucci of Italy's Rai News 24, The Hidden Massacre, asserted that the US military had used white phosphorus (WP) as an incendiary weapon, including against civilians in the Second Battle of Fallujah. The RAI documentary also quoted a 13 June 2005 UK MOD letter to Mahon, stating that:

The US destroyed its remaining stock of Vietnam era napalm in 2001 but, according to the reports for 1 Marine Expeditionary Force (1 MEF) serving in Iraq in 2003, they used a total of 30 MK 77 weapons in Iraq between 31 March and 2 April 2003, against military targets away from civilian areas. The MK 77 firebomb does not have the same composition as napalm, although it has similar destructive characteristics. The Pentagon has also told us that owing to the limited accuracy of the MK 77, it is not generally used in urban terrain or in areas where civilians are congregated.

=== Slobodan Milošević ===
Mahon was a defence witness in the trial of Slobodan Milošević in 2006. Following the testimony of Slobodan Jarčević, foreign minister of the self-declared Republic of Serbian Krajina (RSK) in modern-day Croatia, from October 1992 until becoming foreign policy advisor to the RSK president Milan Martić in April 1994, Milošević called Mahon, who was an MP throughout the 1990s and sat on the NATO parliamentary committee from 1992.

In 1999, she said:

Having visited Yugoslavia, I feel as strongly about the innocent civilian victims of laser-guided bombs as I do about victims of ethnic cleansing and the Albanian refugees who must have the right to return home in safety.

=== Račak ===
Mahon appeared to be critical of the generally accepted narrative of the Račak massacre.

She spoke at the International Criminal Tribunal for the former Yugoslavia on 1 March 2006 and stated under examination: "Yes, I think there is something highly suspicious about what happened at Racak." Judge Robinson responded, "But to say that Mr. Walker arranged it, that's a very serious --" which Mahon interjected to say, "Well, would you like me to say that I think Mr. Walker just happened to be there, and people disagreed with him profoundly about that being a massacre."

=== Macular degeneration ===
Mahon suffered from age-related macular degeneration (AMD), a disease which causes progressive blindness. Mahon lost most of the sight in one eye and expected to lose sight in the other. Calderdale Primary Care Trust refused to fund a drug which could stabilise or improve her condition, in 2007 she threatened to take the PCT to the High Court.

=== Resignation from the Labour Party ===
Mahon resigned her membership of the Labour Party in April 2009, saying she could no longer condone how it operates. She told BBC News that she had considered resigning in 2005, having "totally disapproved of everything Tony Blair was doing", but had been more optimistic of his eventual successor, Gordon Brown: "I hoped we might go back to being a caring and progressive party. In the event I couldn't have been more wrong". She had backed John McDonnell's aborted Labour leadership campaign.

In her letter to the Halifax Constituency Labour Party, she wrote: "This Labour Government should hang its head in shame for inflicting [the Welfare Reform Bill] on the British public just as we face the most severe recession any of us have experienced in a lifetime." The Bill was criticised by a number of disability campaign groups and Labour MPs for not helping the disabled or unemployed. Mahon said she was dismayed at the impotence shown by the government in tackling energy providers and financial institutions. She also condemned the failure of the party to stick to its election manifesto, including pledges not to privatise the Royal Mail and to give the country a referendum on the EU Constitution (which later became the Lisbon Treaty). The smear tactics attempted by Brown's by then former official Damian McBride and lobbyist Derek Draper, which became known around this time, were also a factor in her decision to leave the Labour Party. She told The Yorkshire Post:

My stepdaughter Rachel said to me: 'How could they do that to people like David Cameron and his wife Samantha when they had recently lost their son Ivan? What kind of people think it would be a good idea to smear them?' I was sickened by that – that is not the Labour Party that I joined all those years ago. [...] Quite simply I have had it with New Labour.

Mahon remained active in left-wing politics, including the Campaign for Nuclear Disarmament (CND) and the Stop the War Coalition, of which she was a patron. She was a Distinguished Supporter of Humanists UK, and an Honorary Associate of the National Secular Society. The No2EU campaign said she had decided to support them in the June 2009 European Parliament election.

Mahon was interviewed in 2012 as part of The History of Parliament's oral history project.

She re-joined Labour in 2015 following the election of Jeremy Corbyn as party leader.

== Personal life and death ==
Mahon was married to John Gledhill until the couple divorced in 1972. She then married Tony Mahon, and they remained together until his death in January 2022. She had two sons from her first marriage and a stepdaughter from her second. She was a longtime resident of Northowram, West Yorkshire.

Mahon died from mesothelioma at a care home in Halifax, on 25 December 2022, at the age of 85. A remembrance service was held at Halifax Minster on 6 March 2023, and former Labour leader Jeremy Corbyn was in attendance.

Parliament of the United Kingdom
Preceded by Roy Galley	Member of Parliament for Halifax; 1987–2005	Succeeded by Linda Riordan
