= Halifax (constituency) =

Parliamentary constituency in the United Kingdom

Coordinates: 53°43′N 1°53′W

- Borough constituency for the House of Commons
- Interactive map of boundaries since 2024
- Boundary of Halifax in Yorkshire and the Humber
- County: 1832–1974: West Riding of Yorkshire; 1974–present: West Yorkshire
- Electorate: 70,413 (December 2019)
- Major settlements: Halifax, Sowerby Bridge

Current constituency
- Created: 1832
- Member of Parliament: Kate Dearden (Labour)
- Seats: 1832–1918: Two; 1918–present: One
- Created from: Yorkshire

Halifax is a constituency (Note: A borough constituency (for the purposes of election expenses and type of returning officer)) represented in the House of Commons of the UK Parliament since 2024 by Kate Dearden of the Labour Party. (Note: As with all constituencies, the constituency elects one Member of Parliament (MP) by the first past the post system of election at least every five years.)

== Constituency profile ==
The Halifax constituency is located in the borough of Calderdale in West Yorkshire on the edge of the Pennines. It contains the large town of Halifax, the connected town of Sowerby Bridge and the nearby villages of Northowram, Southowram and Shelf. Halifax was traditionally an industrial mill town, primarily involved in the wool trade. The town's Dean Clough mill complex was once the largest carpet factory in the world. The town is highly deprived, with most of it falling within the top 10% most-deprived areas in England. Sowerby Bridge is a small market town and has average levels of wealth. The average house price in the constituency is low compared to the rest of Yorkshire and less than half the national average.

In general, residents of the constituency have low levels of education, income and professional employment. White people made up 78% of the population at the 2021 census with Asians, predominantly Pakistanis, forming the largest ethnic minority group at 18%. At the local borough council, most of the constituency is represented by the Labour Party, with some Liberal Democrats elected in the western suburbs and Greens in Northowram and Shelf. An estimated 60% of voters in the constituency supported leaving the European Union in the 2016 referendum, higher than the nationwide figure of 52%.

== Boundaries ==
Map of 2010–2024 boundaries

1918–1983: The County Borough of Halifax.

1983–2010: The Metropolitan Borough of Calderdale wards of Illingworth, Mixenden, Northowram and Shelf, Ovenden, St John's, Skircoat, Sowerby Bridge, Town, and Warley.

2010–2024: The Metropolitan Borough of Calderdale wards of Illingworth and Mixenden, Northowram and Shelf, Ovenden, Park, Skircoat, Sowerby Bridge, Town, and Warley.

2024–present: Same as above apart from the addition of part of the Ryburn ward (polling districts MB, MC and MD) from Calder Valley as part of the 2023 Periodic Review of Westminster constituencies, thus bringing the whole of Sowerby Bridge within the constituency.

This constituency covers the large town of Halifax in West Yorkshire and includes the smaller town of Sowerby Bridge which adjoins Halifax but until 1974 was a separate Urban District and was part of the Sowerby constituency until 1983.

== History ==
=== To 1918 ===
The parliamentary borough was granted in the Great Reform Act 1832 and returned from that year until 1918 two members. A county borough recognized the density of the developed area in 1888 which provided most functions for inhabitants, retaining the West Yorkshire ceremonial county. The municipal or county borough was under a mayor, five aldermen and 45 councillors and had an area of 13,967 acres (56.52 km^{2}).

At the time of the Norman Conquest, Halifax formed part of the extensive manor of Wakefield, which belonged to the king, but in the 13th century was in the hands of John Earl de Warrenne aka. Earl of Surrey (1231–1304). (Note: See Sandal Castle and Wakefield Castle) The prosperity of the town began with the first woollen products workshop established here in 1414, when there are said to have been only thirteen houses, which before the end of the 16th century had increased to 520. Camden, about the end of the 17th century, wrote that "the people are very industrious, so that though the soil about it be barren and improfitable, not fit to live on, they have so flourished ... by the clothing trade that they are very rich and have gained a reputation for it above their neighbours." The manufacturing standards and trade were improved by the arrival of certain merchants and clothworkers driven from the Spanish Netherlands by the persecution by the Duke of Alva.

Halifax was a borough by prescription (Note: Legally, the doctrine of prescription (law), as opposed to "by grant", means obtained by long use) rather than a medieval parliamentary borough, its privileges (Note: Among the curious customs of Halifax was the Gibbet Law, which was probably established by a prescriptive right to protect the wool trade, and gave the inhabitants the power of executing anyone taken within their liberty, who, when tried by a jury of sixteen of the frith-burgesses, was found guilty of the theft of any goods of the value of more than 13d. The executions took place on market days on a hill outside the town, the gibbet somewhat resembling a guillotine. The first execution recorded under this law took place in 1541, and the right was exercised in Halifax longer than in any other town, the last execution taking place in 1650. In 1635, the king granted the inhabitants of Halifax licence to found a workhouse in a large house given to them for that purpose by Nathaniel Waterhouse, and incorporated them under the name of the master and governors. Nathaniel Waterhouse was appointed the first master, his successors being elected every year by the twelve governors from among themselves.) growing up with the increased prosperity brought by the cloth trade, but it was not incorporated until 1848. From 1832 until 1918 the town's property-qualifying residents paying scot and lot returned two members to parliament. (Note: In 1607 David Waterhouse, lord of the manor of Halifax, obtained a grant of two markets there every week on Friday and Saturday and two fairs every year, each lasting three days, one beginning on 24 June, the other on 11 November. Later these fairs and markets were confirmed with the addition of an extra market on Thursday to Sir William Ayloffe, baronet, who had succeeded David Waterhouse as lord of the manor. The market rights were sold to the Markets Company in 1810 and purchased from them by the corporation in 1853.)

=== Recent political history ===
Apart from the four years following the 1983 general election, when it was held by a Conservative MP, the seat has been held by an MP representing the Labour Party since 1964.

Prior to the 2017 general election, the Conservative Party launched its election manifesto at Dean Clough Mill in Halifax, and targeted the seat fairly heavily, for two years earlier the Labour majority in the constituency had fallen to just 428 votes, or 1% of the total vote. However, Holly Lynch increased her majority by almost 5,000 votes, giving Labour its biggest majority in Halifax since 2001.

Lynch retained the seat in 2019 and, after she stood down for the 2024 election, it was won by fellow Labour Party member Kate Dearden.

== Members of Parliament ==
=== MPs 1832–1918 ===
Election	1st Member	1st Party	2nd Member	2nd Party
1832	Rawdon Briggs	Whig	Sir Charles Wood	Whig
1835	James Stuart-Wortley	Conservative	Sir Charles Wood	Whig
1837	Edward Davis Protheroe	Radical	Sir Charles Wood	Whig
1847	Henry Edwards	Conservative	Sir Charles Wood	Whig
1852	Sir Francis Crossley	Radical	Sir Charles Wood	Whig
1859	Sir James Stansfeld	Liberal	Sir Charles Wood	Liberal
1865	Sir James Stansfeld	Liberal	Edward Akroyd	Liberal
1874	Sir James Stansfeld	Liberal	John Crossley	Liberal
1877 by-election	Sir James Stansfeld	Liberal	John Dyson Hutchinson	Liberal
1882 by-election	Sir James Stansfeld	Liberal	Thomas Shaw	Liberal
1893 by-election	Sir James Stansfeld	Liberal	William Rawson Shaw	Liberal
1895	Alfred Arnold	Conservative	William Rawson Shaw	Liberal
1897 by-election	Alfred Arnold	Conservative	Alfred Billson	Liberal
1900	Sir Savile Crossley	Liberal Unionist	John Henry Whitley	Liberal
1906	James Parker	Labour	John Henry Whitley	Liberal

=== MPs since 1918 ===
Representation reduced to one member, 1918

Election	Member	Party
1918	John Henry Whitley	Liberal
1921	John Henry Whitley	Speaker
1928 by-election	Arthur Longbottom	Labour
1931	Gilbert Gledhill	Conservative
1945	Dryden Brook	Labour
1955	Maurice Macmillan	Conservative
1964	Shirley Summerskill	Labour
1983	Roy Galley	Conservative
1987	Alice Mahon	Labour
2005	Linda Riordan	Labour
2015	Holly Lynch	Labour
2024	Kate Dearden	Labour

== Elections ==
=== Elections in the 2020s ===
General election 2024: Halifax
Party	Candidate	Votes	%	±%
Labour	Kate Dearden	14,135	35.1	−10.5
Conservative	Hazel Sharp	7,866	19.6	−22.1
Reform	James Griffith-Jones	7,811	19.4	+13.5
Green	Martin Hey	4,133	10.3	+8.3
Workers Party	Shakir Saghir	2,543	6.3	N/A
Liberal Democrats	Samuel Jackson	2,359	5.9	+1.1
Independent	Purveen Hussain	1,367	3.4	N/A
Majority		6,269	15.5	+9.9
Turnout		40,214	51.9	−12.2
Registered electors		77,516		
Labour hold		Swing	▲5.8	

=== Elections in the 2010s ===
2019 notional result
Party	Vote	%
Labour	21,819	45.6
Conservative	19,917	41.7
Brexit Party	2,813	5.9
Liberal Democrats	2,302	4.8
Green	946	2.0
Turnout	47,797	64.1
Electorate	74,563	

General election 2019: Halifax
Party	Candidate	Votes	%	±%
Labour	Holly Lynch	21,496	46.3	−6.4
Conservative	Kashif Ali	18,927	40.7	−0.9
Brexit Party	Sarah Wood	2,813	6.1	N/A
Liberal Democrats	James Baker	2,276	4.9	+2.7
Green	Bella Jessop	946	2.0	N/A
Majority		2,569	5.6	−5.5
Turnout		46,458	64.6	−3.3
Labour hold		Swing	-2.8	

General election 2017: Halifax
Party	Candidate	Votes	%	±%
Labour	Holly Lynch	25,507	52.7	+12.7
Conservative	Chris Pearson	20,131	41.6	+2.6
UKIP	Mark Weedon	1,568	3.2	−9.6
Liberal Democrats	James Baker	1,070	2.2	−1.5
Majority		5,376	11.1	+10.1
Turnout		48,375	67.9	+5.8
Labour hold		Swing	+5.0	

General election 2015: Halifax
Party	Candidate	Votes	%	±%
Labour	Holly Lynch	17,506	40.0	+2.6
Conservative	Philip Allott	17,078	39.0	+5.0
UKIP	Liz Phillips	5,621	12.8	+11.3
Liberal Democrats	Mohammad Ilyas	1,629	3.7	−15.4
Green	Gary Scott	1,142	2.6	N/A
Respect	Asama Javed	465	1.1	N/A
Christian	Trevor Bendrien	312	0.7	N/A
Majority		428	1.0	−2.4
Turnout		43,753	62.1	+0.2
Labour hold		Swing	-1.2	

General election 2010: Halifax
Party	Candidate	Votes	%	±%
Labour Co-op	Linda Riordan	16,278	37.4	−4.4
Conservative	Philip Allott	14,806	34.0	+0.8
Liberal Democrats	Elisabeth Wilson	8,335	19.1	+1.2
BNP	Tom Bates	2,760	6.3	−0.3
Independent Voice for Halifax	Diane Park	722	1.7	N/A
UKIP	Jay Sangha	654	1.5	N/A
Majority		1,472	3.4	−5.4
Turnout		43,555	61.9	+0.9
Labour hold		Swing	-2.6	

=== Elections in the 2000s ===
General election 2005: Halifax
Party	Candidate	Votes	%	±%
Labour Co-op	Linda Riordan	16,579	41.8	−7.2
Conservative	Kris Hopkins	13,162	33.2	−0.6
Liberal Democrats	Michael Taylor	7,100	17.9	+3.3
BNP	Geoff Wallace	2,627	6.6	N/A
National Front	Tom Holmes	191	0.5	N/A
Majority		3,417	8.6	−6.6
Turnout		39,659	61.1	+3.3
Labour Co-op hold		Swing	−3.3	

General election 2001: Halifax
Party	Candidate	Votes	%	±%
Labour	Alice Mahon	19,800	49.0	−5.3
Conservative	James Walsh	13,671	33.8	+1.7
Liberal Democrats	John Durkin	5,878	14.6	+2.6
UKIP	Helen Martinek	1,041	2.6	+1.1
Majority		6,129	15.2	−7.0
Turnout		40,390	57.8	−12.7
Labour hold		Swing		

=== Elections in the 1990s ===
General election 1997: Halifax
Party	Candidate	Votes	%	±%
Labour	Alice Mahon	27,465	54.3	+10.8
Conservative	Robert Light	16,253	32.1	−10.6
Liberal Democrats	Edgar Waller	6,059	12.0	−0.7
UKIP	Constance Whittaker	779	1.5	N/A
Majority		11,212	22.2	+21.4
Turnout		50,556	70.5	−8.2
Labour hold		Swing		

General election 1992: Halifax
Party	Candidate	Votes	%	±%
Labour	Alice Mahon	25,115	43.5	+0.1
Conservative	TR Martin	24,637	42.7	+1.4
Liberal Democrats	Ian R. Howell	7,364	12.7	−2.7
Independent Nationalist	Ron Pearson	649	1.1	N/A
Majority		478	0.8	−1.3
Turnout		57,765	78.7	+1.0
Labour hold		Swing	−0.6	

=== Elections in the 1980s ===
General election 1987: Halifax
Party	Candidate	Votes	%	±%
Labour	Alice Mahon	24,741	43.4	+6.0
Conservative	Roy Galley	23,529	41.3	+0.4
SDP	Laurence Cockcroft	8,758	15.4	−6.3
Majority		1,212	2.1	N/A
Turnout		57,028	77.7	+2.6
Labour gain from Conservative		Swing	+2.7	

General election 1983: Halifax
Party	Candidate	Votes	%	±%
Conservative	Roy Galley	22,321	40.9	
Labour	Shirley Summerskill	20,452	37.4	
SDP	F. Cockroft	11,868	21.7	
Majority		1,869	3.5	N/A
Turnout		54,641	75.1	
Conservative gain from Labour		Swing		

=== Elections in the 1970s ===
General election 1979: Halifax
Party	Candidate	Votes	%	±%
Labour	Shirley Summerskill	21,416	43.79	
Conservative	J. Ford	20,182	41.27	
Liberal	Allen Clegg	6,853	14.01	
National Front	B. Wadsworth	455	0.93	N/A
Majority		1,234	2.52	
Turnout		48,906	76.69	
Labour hold		Swing		

General election October 1974: Halifax
Party	Candidate	Votes	%	±%
Labour	Shirley Summerskill	20,976	44.27	
Conservative	S.R. Lyons	16,798	35.45	
Liberal	Allen Clegg	8,693	18.35	
Powellite	R.S. Pearson	919	1.94	N/A
Majority		4,178	8.82	
Turnout		47,386	74.55	
Labour hold		Swing		

General election February 1974: Halifax
Party	Candidate	Votes	%	±%
Labour	Shirley Summerskill	20,970	40.93	
Conservative	S.R. Lyons	17,967	35.07	
Liberal	Allen Clegg	12,300	24.01	N/A
Majority		3,003	5.86	
Turnout		51,237	81.27	
Labour hold		Swing		

General election 1970: Halifax
Party	Candidate	Votes	%	±%
Labour	Shirley Summerskill	24,026	49.33	
Conservative	G Anthony Turner	23,828	48.93	
Ind. Labour Party	Alistair Graham	847	1.74	N/A
Majority		198	0.40	
Turnout		48,701	73.51	
Labour hold		Swing		

=== Elections in the 1960s ===
General election 1966: Halifax
Party	Candidate	Votes	%	±%
Labour	Shirley Summerskill	25,391	50.28	
Conservative	G Anthony Turner	19,689	38.99	
Liberal	Derek Arthur Carlin	5,423	10.74	
Majority		5,702	11.29	
Turnout		50,503	80.48	
Labour hold		Swing		

General election 1964: Halifax
Party	Candidate	Votes	%	±%
Labour	Shirley Summerskill	23,143	43.76	
Conservative	Maurice Macmillan	22,085	41.75	
Liberal	James Francis Crossley	7,664	14.49	N/A
Majority		1,058	2.01	N/A
Turnout		52,892	82.06	
Labour gain from Conservative		Swing		

=== Elections in the 1950s ===
General election 1959: Halifax
Party	Candidate	Votes	%	±%
Conservative	Maurice Macmillan	29,212	52.25	
Labour	Peter Shore	26,697	47.75	
Majority		2,515	4.50	
Turnout		55,909	83.26	
Conservative hold		Swing		

General election 1955: Halifax
Party	Candidate	Votes	%	±%
Conservative	Maurice Macmillan	28,306	51.39	
Labour	Dryden Brook	26,771	48.61	
Majority		1,535	2.78	N/A
Turnout		55,077	80.15	
Conservative gain from Labour		Swing		

General election 1951: Halifax
Party	Candidate	Votes	%	±%
Labour	Dryden Brook	30,433	50.63	
Conservative	Charles Henry Lucas	29,670	49.37	
Majority		763	1.26	
Turnout		60,103	84.25	
Labour hold		Swing		

General election 1950: Halifax
Party	Candidate	Votes	%	±%
Labour	Dryden Brook	28,800	47.70	
Conservative	Charles Henry Lucas	20,456	33.88	
Liberal	Arthur Pickles	9,573	15.85	
National Liberal	R.H. Blackburn	1,551	2.57	N/A
Majority		8,344	13.82	
Turnout		60,380	85.09	
Labour hold		Swing		

- Blackburn was a vice-president of the Bradford Conservative Association. He was nominated after the Conservative and Liberal associations in the division had failed to reach agreement on the proposal for a joint anti-Labour candidate.

=== Elections in the 1940s ===
General election 1945: Halifax
Party	Candidate	Votes	%	±%
Labour	Dryden Brook	25,605	46.5	+7.0
Conservative	Gilbert Gledhill	14,824	26.9	−17.5
Liberal	Arnold Gelder	14,631	26.6	+10.5
Majority		10,781	19.6	N/A
Turnout		55,060	77.4	+0.5
Labour gain from Conservative		Swing	+11.3	

=== Elections in the 1930s ===
General election 1935: Halifax
Party	Candidate	Votes	%	±%
Conservative	Gilbert Gledhill	24,103	44.4	−21.3
Labour	Arthur Longbottom	21,471	39.5	+9.8
Liberal	Ashley Mitchell	8,736	16.1	N/A
Majority		2,632	4.9	−31.1
Turnout		54,310	76.9	−3.6
Conservative hold		Swing	−15.6	

General election 1931: Halifax
Party	Candidate	Votes	%	±%
Conservative	Gilbert Gledhill	36,731	65.7	+36.0
Labour	Arthur Longbottom	16,601	29.7	−12.5
Independent Liberal	Frank Sykes	2,578	4.6	N/A
Majority		20,130	36.0	N/A
Turnout		55,910	80.5	−0.8
Conservative gain from Labour		Swing	+24.2	

=== Elections in the 1920s ===
General election 1929: Halifax
Party	Candidate	Votes	%	±%
Labour	Arthur Longbottom	23,776	42.2	N/A
Unionist	Gilbert Gledhill	16,713	29.7	N/A
Liberal	Elliott Dodds	15,823	28.1	N/A
Majority		7,063	12.5	N/A
Turnout		55,312	81.3	N/A
Registered electors		69,301		
Labour gain from Liberal		Swing	N/A	

Harry Barnes

1928 Halifax by-election
Party	Candidate	Votes	%	±%
Labour	Arthur Longbottom	17,536	42.8	N/A
Liberal	Harry Barnes	12,585	30.8	N/A
Unionist	Francis Crossley, 2nd Baron Somerleyton	10,804	26.4	N/A
Majority		4,951	12.0	N/A
Turnout		40,925	78.7	N/A
Registered electors		52,013		
Labour gain from Liberal		Swing	N/A	

General election 1924: Halifax
Party	Candidate	Votes	%	±%
Speaker	John Henry Whitley	Unopposed		
Speaker hold				

General election 1923: Halifax
Party	Candidate	Votes	%	±%
Speaker	John Henry Whitley	Unopposed		
Speaker hold				

General election 1922: Halifax
Party	Candidate	Votes	%	±%
Speaker	John Henry Whitley	Unopposed		
Speaker hold				

=== Elections in the 1910s ===
Whitley

General election 1918: Halifax
Party		Candidate	Votes	%	±%
C	Liberal	John Henry Whitley	22,136	84.6	+51.2
	Socialist Labour	Arthur McManus	4,036	15.4	N/A
Majority			18,100	69.2	+53.3
Turnout			26,172	53.4	−33.6
Registered electors			49,017		
	Liberal hold		Swing		
C indicates candidate endorsed by the coalition government.

General election December 1910: Halifax
Party	Candidate	Votes	%	±%
Liberal	John Henry Whitley	8,778	33.4	−7.3
Labour	James Parker	8,511	32.3	−6.6
Conservative	John Herbert Lacy Baldwin	4,602	17.5	+7.3'"`UNIQ−−ref−00000115−QINU`"'
Conservative	James Galbraith	4,420	16.8	+6.6'"`UNIQ−−ref−00000116−QINU`"'
Turnout		26,311	87.0	−5.6
Registered electors		15,528		
Majority		4,176	15.9	−4.4
Liberal hold		Swing	−7.3	
Majority		3,909	14.8	−3.7
Labour hold		Swing	−7.0	

General election January 1910: Halifax
Party	Candidate	Votes	%	±%
Liberal	John Henry Whitley	9,504	40.7	+0.6
Labour	James Parker	9,093	38.9	+0.6
Conservative	James Galbraith	4,754	20.4	−1.2
Turnout		23,351	92.6	−0.4
Registered electors		15,528		
Majority		4,750	20.3	+1.8
Liberal hold		Swing	+0.9	
Majority		4,339	18.5	+1.8
Labour hold		Swing	+0.9	

=== Elections in the 1900s ===
By-election, 1907: Halifax
Party	Candidate	Votes	%	±%
Liberal	John Henry Whitley	Unopposed		
Liberal hold				

Crossley, Whitley and Parker

General election 1906: Halifax
Party	Candidate	Votes	%	±%
Liberal	John Henry Whitley	9,354	40.1	−14.0
Labour Repr. Cmte.	James Parker	8,937	38.3	+22.0
Liberal Unionist	Savile Crossley	5,041	21.6	−8.0
Turnout		23,332	93.0	+6.3
Registered electors		15,316		
Majority		4,313	18.5	+7.2
Liberal hold		Swing	−18.0	
Majority		3,896	16.7	N/A
Labour Repr. Cmte. gain from Liberal Unionist		Swing	+15.0	

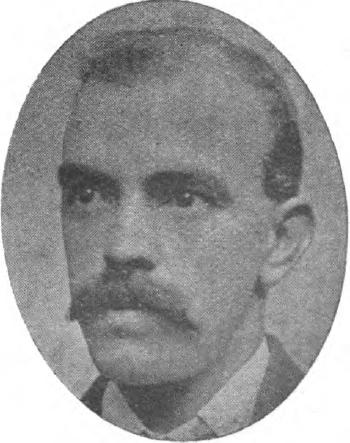
James Parker

General election 1900: Halifax
Party	Candidate	Votes	%	±%
Liberal Unionist	Savile Crossley	5,931	29.6	+0.3
Liberal	John Henry Whitley	5,543	27.6	+0.4
Liberal	Alfred Billson	5,325	26.5	+3.5
Labour Repr. Cmte.	James Parker	3,276	16.3	−4.2
Turnout		20,075	86.7	−1.2
Registered electors		14,879		
Majority		606	3.1	−3.2
Liberal Unionist hold		Swing	−0.1	
Majority		2,267	11.3	+4.6
Liberal hold		Swing	−1.9	

=== Elections in the 1890s ===
By-election, 1897: Halifax
Party	Candidate	Votes	%	±%
Liberal	Alfred Billson	5,664	43.8	−6.4
Liberal Unionist	Savile Crossley	5,252	40.7	+11.4
Ind. Labour Party	Tom Mann	2,000	15.5	−5.0
Majority		412	3.1	−3.6
Turnout		12,916	90.4	+2.5
Registered electors		14,290		
Liberal hold		Swing	−8.9	

- Caused by Shaw's resignation.

General election 1895: Halifax
Party	Candidate	Votes	%	±%
Conservative	Alfred Arnold	5,475	29.3	+2.7
Liberal	William Rawson Shaw	5,085	27.2	−9.9
Liberal	James Booth	4,283	23.0	−13.3
Ind. Labour Party	John Lister	3,818	20.5	N/A
Turnout		12,169 (est)	87.9	+4.0
Registered electors		13,844		
Majority		1,192	6.3	N/A
Conservative gain from Liberal		Swing	+6.3	
Majority		1,267	6.7	−3.0
Liberal hold		Swing	−6.3	

By-election, 1893: Halifax
Party	Candidate	Votes	%	±%
Liberal	William Rawson Shaw	4,620	38.9	−34.5
Conservative	Alfred Arnold	4,252	35.7	+9.1
Ind. Labour Party	John Lister	3,028	25.4	N/A
Turnout		11,900	89.4	+5.5
Registered electors		13,317		
Majority		368	3.2	−6.5
Liberal hold		Swing	−21.8	

- Caused by Shaw's death

General election 1892: Halifax
Party	Candidate	Votes	%	±%
Liberal	Thomas Shaw	6,481	37.1	−0.6
Liberal	James Stansfeld	6,361	36.3	−1.0
Conservative	Alfred Arnold	4,663	26.6	+1.6
Turnout		11,056 (est)	83.9	+10.1
Registered electors		13,177		
Majority		1,698	9.7	−2.6
Liberal hold		Swing	−1.1	
Liberal hold		Swing	−1.3	

=== Elections in the 1880s ===
General election 1886: Halifax
Party	Candidate	Votes	%	±%
Liberal	Thomas Shaw	5,427	37.7	−0.7
Liberal	James Stansfeld	5,381	37.3	+0.2
Conservative	Alfred Morris	3,612	25.0	+0.5
Majority		1,769	12.3	−0.3
Turnout		9,055	73.8	−8.9
Registered electors		12,269		
Liberal hold		Swing	−0.5	
Liberal hold		Swing	0.0	

By-election, 3 Apr 1886: Halifax
Party	Candidate	Votes	%	±%
Liberal	James Stansfeld	Unopposed		
Liberal hold				

- Caused by Stansfeld's appointment as President of the Local Government Board.

General election 1885: Halifax
Party	Candidate	Votes	%	±%
Liberal	Thomas Shaw	6,269	38.4	−1.0
Liberal	James Stansfeld	6,053	37.1	−2.2
Conservative	Alfred Morris	3,988	24.5	+3.2
Majority		2,065	12.6	−5.4
Turnout		10,144	82.7	−1.2 (est)
Registered electors		12,269		
Liberal hold		Swing	−0.4	
Liberal hold		Swing	−2.0	

By-election, 21 Aug 1882: Halifax
Party	Candidate	Votes	%	±%
Liberal	Thomas Shaw	Unopposed		
Liberal hold				

- Caused by Hutchinson's resignation.

General election 1880: Halifax
Party	Candidate	Votes	%	±%
Liberal	James Stansfeld	6,392	39.4	+2.8
Liberal	John Dyson Hutchinson	6,364	39.3	+2.1
Conservative	William Barber	3,452	21.3	−4.9
Majority		2,912	18.0	+7.6
Turnout		9,844 (est)	83.9 (est)	+0.2
Registered electors		11,728		
Liberal hold		Swing	+2.6	
Liberal hold		Swing	+2.3	

=== Elections in the 1870s ===
1877 Halifax by-election
Party	Candidate	Votes	%	±%
Liberal	John Dyson Hutchinson	5,750	61.3	−12.5
Conservative	Richard Wilson Gamble	3,624	38.7	+12.5
Majority		2,126	22.6	+12.2
Turnout		9,374	79.9	−3.8
Registered electors		11,737		
Liberal hold		Swing	-12.5	

- Caused by Crossley's resignation.

General election 1874: Halifax
Party	Candidate	Votes	%	±%
Liberal	John Crossley	5,563	37.2	−1.7
Liberal	James Stansfeld	5,473	36.6	−3.3
Conservative	Henry Charles McCrea	3,927	26.2	N/A
Majority		1,546	10.4	−7.3
Turnout		9,445 (est)	83.7 (est)	−2.2
Registered electors		11,282		
Liberal hold		Swing		
Liberal hold		Swing		

1871 Halifax by-election
Party	Candidate	Votes	%	±%
Liberal	John Crossley	Unopposed		
Liberal hold				

- Caused by Crossley's appointment as President of the Poor Law Board.

=== Elections in the 1860s ===
By-election, 21 December 1868: Halifax
Party	Candidate	Votes	%	±%
Liberal	James Stansfeld	Unopposed		
Liberal hold				

- Caused by Stansfeld's appointment as a Lord Commissioner of the Treasury.

General election 1868: Halifax
Party	Candidate	Votes	%	±%
Liberal	James Stansfeld	5,278	39.9	N/A
Liberal	Edward Akroyd	5,141	38.9	N/A
Lib-Lab	Edward Owen Greening	2,802	21.2	N/A
Majority		2,339	17.7	N/A
Turnout		8,012 (est)	85.9 (est)	N/A
Registered electors		9,328		
Liberal hold				
Liberal hold				

General election 1865: Halifax
Party	Candidate	Votes	%	±%
Liberal	James Stansfeld	Unopposed		
Liberal	Edward Akroyd	Unopposed		
Registered electors		1,771		
Liberal hold				
Liberal hold				

By-election, 28 April 1863: Halifax
Party	Candidate	Votes	%	±%
Liberal	James Stansfeld	Unopposed		
Liberal hold				

- Caused by Stansfeld's appointment as Civil Lord of the Admiralty.

=== Elections in the 1850s ===
By-election, 28 June 1859: Halifax
Party	Candidate	Votes	%	±%
Liberal	Charles Wood	Unopposed		
Liberal hold				

- Caused by Wood's appointment as Secretary of State for India.

General election 1859: Halifax
Party	Candidate	Votes	%	±%
Liberal	James Stansfeld	Unopposed		
Liberal	Charles Wood	Unopposed		
Registered electors		1,521		
Liberal hold				
Liberal hold				

General election 1857: Halifax
Party	Candidate	Votes	%	±%
Radical	Francis Crossley	830	37.8	+4.6
Whig	Charles Wood	714	32.5	−2.0
Conservative	Henry Edwards	651	29.7	−0.5
Turnout		1,423 (est)	95.6 (est)	+3.5
Registered electors		1,488		
Majority		116	5.3	+2.3
Radical hold		Swing	+2.8	
Majority		63	2.8	+1.5
Whig hold		Swing	−1.7	

By-election, 3 March 1855: Halifax
Party	Candidate	Votes	%	±%
Whig	Charles Wood	Unopposed		
Whig hold				

- Caused by Wood's appointment as First Lord of the Admiralty

By-election, 5 January 1853: Halifax
Party	Candidate	Votes	%	±%
Whig	Charles Wood	592	53.0	+18.5
Conservative	Henry Edwards	526	47.0	+16.8
Majority		66	6.0	+4.7
Turnout		1,118	91.8	−0.3
Registered electors		1,218		
Whig hold		Swing	+0.9	

- Caused by Wood's appointment as President of the Board of Control.

General election 1852: Halifax
Party	Candidate	Votes	%	±%
Whig	Charles Wood	596	34.5	+3.7
Radical	Francis Crossley	573	33.2	+12.0
Conservative	Henry Edwards	521	30.2	−0.8
Chartist	Ernest Charles Jones	37	2.1	−14.9
Turnout		1,106 (est)	92.1 (est)	+11.5
Registered electors		1,200		
Majority		23	1.3	−8.3
Whig hold		Swing	+2.1	
Majority		52	3.0	N/A
Radical gain from Conservative		Swing	+6.2	

=== Elections in the 1840s ===
General election 1847: Halifax
Party	Candidate	Votes	%	±%
Conservative	Henry Edwards	511	31.0	+2.2
Whig	Charles Wood	507	30.8	−3.6
Radical	Edward Miall	349	21.2	−15.6
Chartist	Ernest Charles Jones	280	17.0	N/A
Turnout		824 (est)	80.6 (est)	−7.6
Registered electors		1,022		
Majority		162	9.8	N/A
Conservative gain from Radical		Swing	+5.0	
Majority		158	9.6	+4.0
Whig hold		Swing	+2.1	

By-election, 9 July 1846: Halifax
Party	Candidate	Votes	%	±%
Whig	Charles Wood	Unopposed		
Whig hold				

- Caused by Wood's appointment as Chancellor of the Exchequer

General election 1841: Halifax
Party	Candidate	Votes	%	±%
Radical	Edward Protheroe	409	36.8	−1.6
Whig	Charles Wood	383	34.4	−3.3
Conservative	George Sinclair	320	28.8	+4.9
Turnout		704	88.2	+6.4
Registered electors		78.3		
Majority		26	2.4	−12.2
Radical hold		Swing	−2.0	
Majority		63	5.6	−8.2
Whig hold		Swing	−2.9	

=== Elections in the 1830s ===
General election 1837: Halifax
Party	Candidate	Votes	%	±%
Radical	Edward Protheroe	496	38.4	+6.1
Whig	Charles Wood	487	37.7	+2.4
Conservative	James Stuart-Wortley	308	23.9	−8.5
Turnout		793	81.8	−10.9
Registered electors		970		
Majority		188	14.5	N/A
Radical gain from Conservative		Swing	+5.2	
Majority		179	13.8	+10.9
Whig hold		Swing	+3.3	

General election 1835: Halifax
Party	Candidate	Votes	%	±%
Whig	Charles Wood	336	35.3	−21.7
Conservative	James Stuart-Wortley	308	32.4	+11.6
Radical	Edward Protheroe	307	32.3	+10.1
Turnout		601	92.7	±0.0
Registered electors		648		
Majority		28	2.9	−3.0
Whig hold		Swing	−13.4	
Majority		1	0.1	N/A
Conservative gain from Whig		Swing	+11.2	

General election 1832: Halifax
Party	Candidate	Votes	%
Whig	Rawdon Briggs (politician)	242	28.9
Whig	Charles Wood	235	28.1
Radical	Michael Stocks	186	22.2
Tory	James Stuart-Wortley	174	20.8
Majority		49	5.9
Turnout		492	92.7
Registered electors		531	
Whig win (new seat)			
Whig win (new seat)			

== See also ==
- List of parliamentary constituencies in West Yorkshire
- List of parliamentary constituencies in the Yorkshire and the Humber (region)

== Sources ==
- Victoria County History, Yorkshire
- T. Wright, The Antiquities of the Town of Halifax (Leeds, 1738)
- John Watson, The History and Antiquities of the Parish of Halifax (London, 1775)
- John Crabtree, A Concise History of the Parish and Vicarage of Halifax (Halifax and London, 1836).
- Craig, F. W. S. (1983) [1969]. British parliamentary election results 1918–1949 (3rd ed.). Chichester: Parliamentary Research Services. ISBN 0-900178-06-X.

Parliament of the United Kingdom
Preceded by Penrith and Cockermouth	Constituency represented by the speaker 1921–1928	Succeeded by Daventry
