= Cameron Gull =

English barrister and politician

Sir William Cameron Gull, Bt OBE MP JP

Member of Parliament for Barnstaple
- In office 13 July 1895 – 25 September 1900
- Preceded by: Alfred Billson
- Succeeded by: Ernest Joseph Soares

Personal details
- Born: 6 January 1860 Finsbury, Middlesex
- Died: 15 December 1922 (aged 62) Yattendon, Berkshire
- Party: Liberal Unionist
- Spouses: Annie Clayton Lindley (m. 1886; died 1906) Evelyn Louisa (m. 1908)
- Children: 8
- Parent: William Gull (father)
- Education: Eton College; Christ Church, Oxford

Sir William Cameron Gull, 2nd Baronet, OBE, JP (6 January 1860 – 15 December 1922), known as Sir Cameron Gull, was a barrister and Liberal Unionist politician in England, who served for five years as a member of parliament (MP).

== Early life ==
Gull was born on 6 January 1860, the third child of the leading 19th century physician Sir William Withey Gull and his wife Susan Gull. His elder siblings were Caroline Cameron Gull (born 1851) and Cameron Gull (born 1858, died in infancy).

At the time of his birth, his father had a home-based practice at 8 Finsbury Square, London. A year later, the family moved to a new home at 74 Brook Street, in London's Mayfair district.

William was educated at Eton College and later studied law at Christ Church, Oxford, winning the Vinerian Scholarship in 1883.

When his father died in 1890, Gull and his family lived at Gloucester Street, off Portman Square. William Gull was named as one of the executors of his father's will. He inherited the sum of £40,000 and all his father's real estate, which included the house in Mayfair and a house in Scotland. He also inherited his father's title, becoming 2nd Baronet.

== Barrister and Member of Parliament ==
Gull was a barrister of Lincoln's Inn in the City of London, called to the bar in 1886.

In 1890, he was a co-author of a treatise of the Partnership Act 1890, along with his father-in-law Nathaniel Lindley, Baron Lindley, then one of the Lord Justices of Appeal, and his brother-in-law Walter Barry Lindley, also a barrister at Lincoln's Inn. The Partnership Act 1890 established the legal rules that defined the nature of a legal partnership, the powers and obligations of partners and limitations of liability. Between 1891 and 1894 he was a member of the London School Board. In 1892 he stood unsuccessfully for parliament as a Liberal Unionist in the Moray and Nairn constituency in Scotland.

At the general election of July 1895, Gull was elected as the Liberal Unionist Member of Parliament for the Barnstaple division of Devon. In the ensuing Parliament the Liberal Unionist party was to support the ruling Conservative administration led by Lord Salisbury.

During his term in parliament, Gull supported the 1896 reform of Poor Law barrack schools. He also took an interest in rail transport, rural affairs and in foreign affairs such as the Boxer Rebellion in China and the conduct of the Boer War

At the 1900 general election, held between 25 September and 24 October, Gull lost his Barnstaple seat to his Liberal opponent Ernest Joseph Soares.

He was High Sheriff of Berkshire for 1908. He was appointed an Officer of the Order of the British Empire in the 1918 Birthday Honours At the time of his death he was an alderman of Berkshire County Council.

== Family ==
In 1886, Gull married the Hon. Annie Clayton Lindley, daughter of Nathaniel Lindley, Baron Lindley, and Sarah Katherine Teale. They lived together at Frilsham House at Frilsham in Berkshire. They had two sons and four daughters. The elder son, Francis William Lindley Gull, was born on 1 November 1889 and educated at Eton, leaving the school in 1908. He served with the rank of Major in the Rifle Brigade, was wounded in France in the summer of 1916 and was eventually killed in action on 25 August 1918. The second son was Richard Cameron Gull. He became the 3rd Baronet upon his father's death in 1922. The four daughters were Mary Edith Gull (born 1887); Amy Beatrice Gull (1888–1971); Jessie Katherine Gull (1892–1894); and Dorothea Susan Gull (born 1897).

Two years after his wife's death in 1908, Gull married secondly Evelyn Louisa, a daughter of Sir Thomas Snagge, and with her had a son and a daughter.

== Other work ==
He was on the governing body of Abingdon School from 1910 to 1919.

Parliament of the United Kingdom
Preceded by Alfred Billson	Member of Parliament for Barnstaple; 1895 – 1900	Succeeded by Ernest Soares
Baronetage of the United Kingdom
Preceded by William Withey Gull	Baronet (of Brook Street); 1890–1922	Succeeded by Richard Cameron Gull
