= Savile Crossley, 1st Baron Somerleyton =

British politician

The Right Honourable The Lord Somerleyton GCVO PC
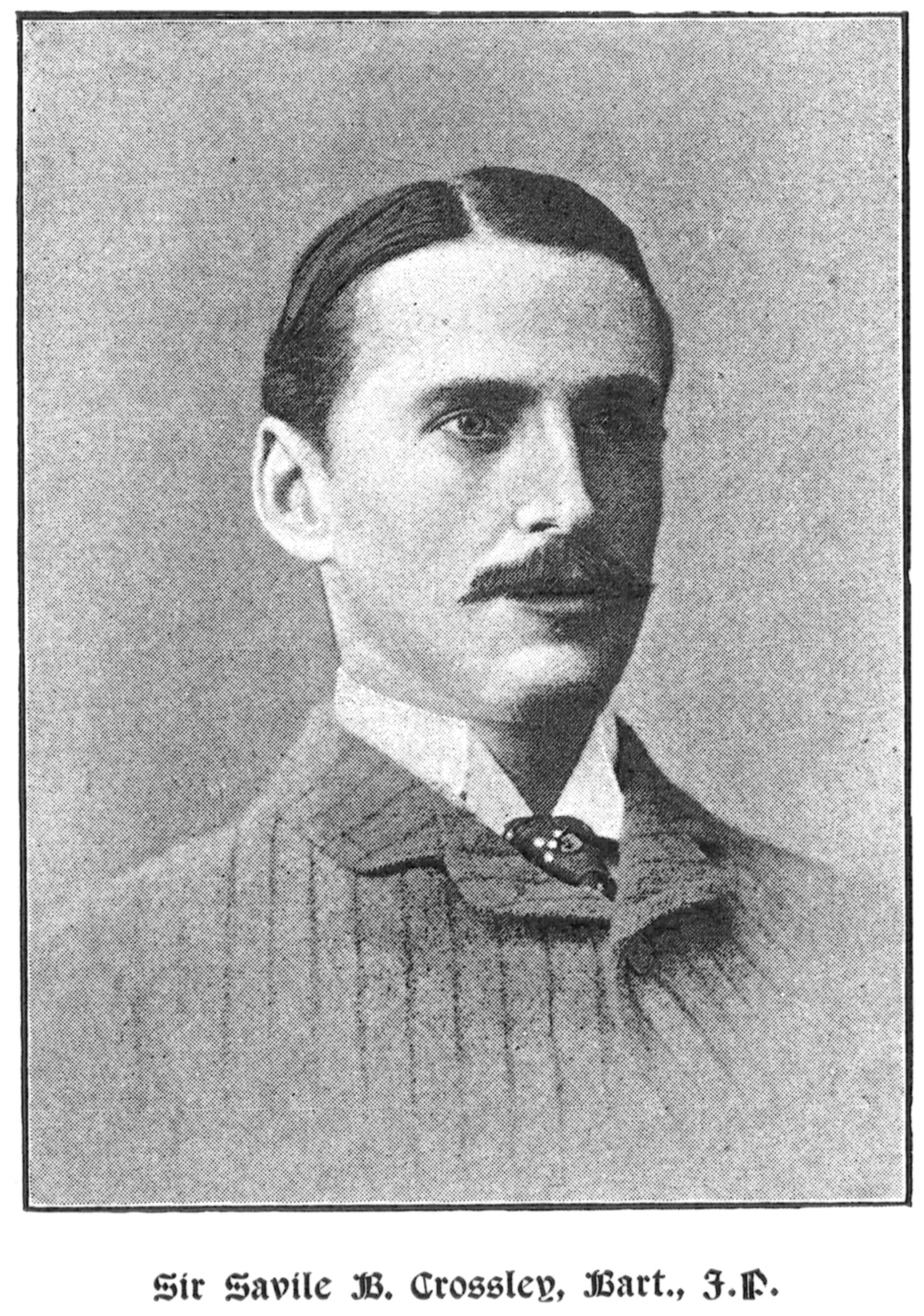
- Crossley, c. 1893

Paymaster General
- In office November 1902 – 4 December 1905
- Monarch: Edward VII
- Prime Minister: Arthur Balfour
- Preceded by: The Duke of Marlborough
- Succeeded by: Richard Causton

Personal details
- Born: 14 June 1857
- Died: 25 February 1935 (aged 77)
- Party: Liberal; Liberal Unionist
- Spouse(s): Phyllis de Bathe (1869–1948)
- Parent(s): Sir Francis Crossley, 1st Baronet; Martha Eliza Brinton

Savile Brinton Crossley, 1st Baron Somerleyton GCVO PC (14 June 1857 – 25 February 1935), known as Sir Savile Crossley, Bt, from 1872 to 1916, was a British Liberal Unionist politician who served as Paymaster General from 1902 to 1905. He later became a Unionist when the Liberal Unionists merged with the Conservatives in 1912.

== Background ==
Crossley was the only son of the businessman and Liberal politician Sir Francis Crossley, 1st Baronet, and his wife Martha Eliza, daughter of Henry Brinton.

== Political career ==
Crossley was elected to parliament for Lowestoft in 1885, as a Liberal. In 1886 he joined the Liberal Unionists and held the seat until 1892 when he chose not to stand again for Lowestoft.

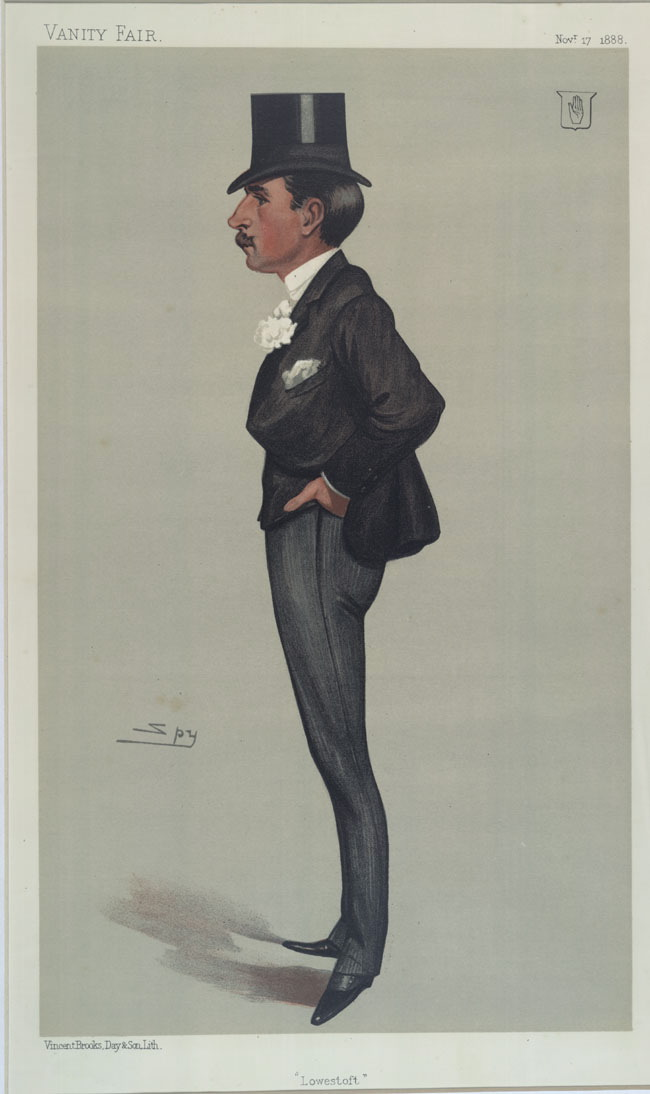
"Lowestoft". Caricature by Spy published in Vanity Fair in 1888.

In 1897 Crossley stood as a Liberal Unionist in a by-election for Halifax. He failed that time but stood again in Halifax in the 1900 general election and won the seat. He was appointed High Sheriff of Suffolk for 1896–97.

Crossley was involved in work regarding the National Coronation gift from the people to their new monarch King Edward VII, and was present as it was awarded to the King two days after the coronation, on 11 August 1902. For his service, he was invested as a Member (fourth class) of the Royal Victorian Order (MVO).

In November 1902 he was appointed Paymaster General in the Conservative government of Arthur Balfour, and was admitted to the Privy Council in December of the same year. He remained in this post until the government fell in December 1905, and he lost his seat in the 1906 general election that followed shortly after. Crossley was never to re-enter the House of Commons.

However, in 1916 he was raised to the peerage as Baron Somerleyton, of Somerleyton in the County of Suffolk; Savile Crossley lived in Somerleyton Hall, as do his descendants. Two years later he was appointed a Lord-in-waiting (government whip) in the coalition government of David Lloyd George. The coalition fell in 1922, but Somerleyton remained as a whip also in the Conservative administrations of Bonar Law and Stanley Baldwin. However, after the first Baldwin government fell in 1924, he was never to hold ministerial office again.

== Military and civic appointments ==
Crossley held the appointment of honorary major in the Army. He was on 2 April 1893 appointed a captain in The Prince of Wales's Own Norfolk Artillery, a militia battalion stationed at Great Yarmouth in Norfolk.

He volunteered for active service in South Africa during the Second Boer War, and was on 10 March 1900 appointed captain in the Imperial Yeomanry and attached to its 18th battalion, where he would act in command of the 71st (Sharpshooters′) Company. The battalion left Southampton on the SS Galeka in early April 1900, arriving in South Africa later the same month. In early May 1902 he was back as a captain in the Norfolk Artillery. He was promoted to the substantive rank of major and honorary lieutenant-colonel of the battalion later the same month, and later served as lieutenant-colonel commanding the battalion.

== Family ==
Lord Somerleyton married Phyllis de Bathe, daughter of General Sir Henry Percival de Bathe, in 1887. He died in February 1935, aged 77, and was succeeded in the baronetcy and barony by his eldest son, Francis Savile Crossley. His younger son, John, was the father of Belinda Douglas-Scott-Montagu, Baroness Montagu of Beaulieu. Lady Somerleyton died in 1948.

== Arms ==
Coat of arms of Savile Crossley, 1st Baron Somerleyton
Crest A demi-hind erased Proper charged with two bars holding between the feet a cross-crosslet Or. Escutcheon Gules a chevron indented Ermine between two cross-crosslets in chief and a saltire coupled in base Or. Supporters On either side a hind Proper semee of cross-crosslets Or. Motto All Good Is From Above

Parliament of the United Kingdom
New constituency	Member of Parliament for Lowestoft; 1885–1892	Succeeded by Harry Foster
Preceded by Alfred Billson; Sir Alfred Arnold	Member of Parliament for Halifax; 1900–1906; With: John Henry Whitley	Succeeded by John Henry Whitley; James Parker
Political offices
Preceded by The Duke of Marlborough	Paymaster General; 1902–1905	Succeeded by Richard Causton
Preceded by The Lord Herschell; The Lord Stanmore; The Lord Ranksborough; The Viscount Valentia; The Lord Hylton	Lord-in-waiting; 1918–1924; With: The Lord Herschell 1918–1919; The Lord Stanmore 1918–1922; The Lord Ranksborough 1918–1921; The Viscount Valentia 1918–1924; The Earl of Jersey 1919; The Earl of Bradford 1919–1924; The Earl of Onslow 1919–1920; The Earl of Lucan 1920–1924; The Earl of Clarendon 1921–1922; The Earl of Malmesbury 1922–1924; The Earl of Albemarle 1922–1924	Succeeded by The Earl De La Warr; The Lord Muir-Mackenzie
Peerage of the United Kingdom
New creation	Baron Somerleyton; 1916–1935	Succeeded by Francis Savile Crossley
Baronetage of the United Kingdom
Preceded by Francis Crossley	Baronet (of Belle Vue and Somerleyton); 1872–1935	Succeeded by Francis Savile Crossley
