= 1868 Halifax by-election =

UK parliamentary by-election

The 1868 Halifax by-election was a by-election held in England on 21 December 1868 for the UK House of Commons constituency of Halifax in the West Riding of Yorkshire. The by-election was held due to the incumbent Liberal MP, James Stansfeld, becoming Lord Commissioner of the Treasury. It was retained by Stansfeld who was unopposed.
