= Dryden Brook =

British politician (1884–1971)

Sir Dryden Brook (25 August 1884 – 30 January 1971) was a Labour Party politician in the United Kingdom, and a Member of Parliament (MP) from 1945 to 1955.

Brook was a wool merchant in Halifax. He served as a Labour Party member of Halifax Borough Council from 1940 until 1968.

In the Labour landslide at the 1945 general election, Brook was elected as Member of Parliament (MP) for Halifax, unseating the Conservative MP Gilbert Gledhill with a majority of over 10,000 votes. He held the seat until the 1955 general election, when the Conservative Maurice Macmillan won with a majority of 1,535.

Alderman Brook was knighted in 1965.

== Sources ==
- Craig, F. W. S. (1983) [1969]. British parliamentary election results 1918-1949 (3rd ed.). Chichester: Parliamentary Research Services. ISBN 0-900178-06-X.
- Leigh Rayment's Historical List of MPs

Parliament of the United Kingdom
| Preceded by Gilbert Gledhill | Member of Parliament for Halifax; 1945–1955 | Succeeded by Maurice Macmillan |
