= Alfred Arnold =

British politician

Arnold in 1895.

Sir Alfred Arnold (18 November 1835 – 31 October 1908) was an English Conservative politician who was the member of parliament for Halifax from 1895 to 1900.

== Birth and education ==
Born at Cheltenham on 18 November 1835, he was the youngest son of Rev. Frederick Arnold, Master of the Crypt School, Gloucester, and later Rector of Brimington, Derbyshire, and his wife Jane, a daughter of Rev. Solomon Piggott (author of a number of curious works including Suicide and its Antidotes, 1824). Educated at Chesterfield Grammar School, he proceeded to Sidney Sussex College, Cambridge. However, he did not graduate and, at the age of nineteen, married a woman some years his senior.

== Business career ==
He joined the banking house of W. A. Britton & Company (later Britton and Koontz Bank) at Natchez, Mississippi, but fled the city during the American Civil War, "running the blockade with his wife and son through the Northern and Southern Armies". From 1863 he lived in suburban London before removing to Yorkshire to manage the business of James Royston, Son & Company of Shroggs Mill, Halifax. This firm, established in 1787, had recently come under the control of his uncle Dr G. W. Royston Piggott, FRS. Its business was the manufacture of wire, particularly for textile carding, and Arnold acquired full ownership of the firm in 1873.

He was admitted a student of the Inner Temple when aged nearly forty and was called to the Bar in July 1878. In the month following his call he was appointed to the Halifax borough magistracy and five years later he also became a justice of the peace for the West Riding. From 1882 he was a Director of the Halifax and Huddersfield Union Bank, and from 1885 until his death he was President of the rapidly expanding Halifax Equitable Benefit Building Society (which later merged with a similar local institution to become the Halifax Building Society). He served as President of the Halifax Literary and Philosophical Society in 1897, entertaining the explorer Fridtjof Nansen on the occasion of his addressing the society.

== Entry into politics ==
Involving himself in local politics, in the Conservative cause and as a determined opponent of Irish Home Rule, he was elected a councillor for Halifax's South Ward in 1878 and remained one until 1896. Driven by personal enthusiasm and intolerant of political lukewarmness in others, he became President of the Halifax Conservative Association in 1889. Intent on making the association a more representative and democratic body, he succeeded in reforming it as the Halifax Conservative Union in the following year. The Union elected him its first President and adopted him as its prospective candidate for the Halifax Parliamentary constituency (which at that time returned two MPs to Westminster).

Contesting the constituency at the 1892 General Election, he finished bottom of the poll with 4,663 votes. In the 1893 by-election he was again unsuccessful (with 4,251 votes) but in July 1895, when there was a national swing to the Conservatives, he topped the poll with 5,475 votes (from a total of 12,186 cast for four candidates), 390 more than the other successful candidate. He was the first Conservative to be returned to Parliament by Halifax in more than thirty years.

One of the defeated candidates was the Liberal James Booth, four times Mayor of Halifax, who some months earlier had sued Arnold for slander and obtained judgment against him for £85 damages. Arnold's appeal against the award was dismissed by the Court of Appeal in February 1895, and this misadventure was followed in May by Arnold injuring his leg when he slipped off the footboard of a train at Huddersfield. The injury limited his personal involvement in his July election campaign and when he made his first appearance in the House of Commons in August it was on crutches. The injury was later said to have left him "permanently lame".

== Member of Parliament ==
His service in the House of Commons was uneventful. He duly presented constituency petitions to Parliament, voted with reasonable regularity (in April 1897 he was reported as present in 78 of the current session's 185 divisions), but made few contributions to debates. He took an active interest in proposals to introduce a State-funded old age pension, was vigorous in his opposition to limiting the working day to eight hours, and was sympathetic to limited suffrage for women.

He did not contest the 1900 General Election, when his seat was retained for the Unionist alliance by Sir Savile Crossley with an increased majority.

== After retirement from Parliament ==
Although a barrister, Arnold did not practise as such except on the single occasion in 1902 when, as junior counsel to Balfour Browne KC, he appeared before a Select Committee of the House of Commons to argue in favour of the Halifax Corporation Bill which provided for enlargement of the borough's limits, extension of its tramways, and various other local matters. These latter included controversial provisions granting the corporation a monopoly over the holding of fairs and making tuberculosis a notifiable disease: both provisions were struck out and, as amended, the Bill was passed into law.

The Birthday Honours of 1903 included a knighthood for Arnold in what the Leeds Mercury described as "somewhat belated recognition of his services to his party". He was invested by Edward VII at Buckingham Palace on 18 July, making him "Halifax’s only knight".

He regularly sat as Chairman of the Halifax Magistrates and in January 1905 presided when nine "passive resisters" appeared on charges of failure to pay the educational rate levied under the Education Act 1902. When their failure was explained as protest against the rate benefiting sectarian schools, Arnold insisted this was no excuse for breach of a legal obligation. He had previously, at a well-publicised Conservative Union meeting, warned that ratepayers' refusal to pay rates of which they did not approve would lead to "absolute chaos".

When, later in January, there appeared before him some of the additional sixty-seven individuals summonsed for non-payment of the rate, it transpired that Arnold himself was one of those sixty-seven. He had withheld payment in protest at what he considered the Borough Education Committee's unfair treatment of voluntary schools and freely admitted that he had no legal excuse for non-payment. To overcome the defendants' objection to his hearing the case against them, he immediately paid the prosecuting rate collector the amount he had withheld plus the cost of his summons. Saying "I object to the rate as much as anybody but I have paid it", he proposed to continue dealing with the case and in this was supported by his fellow magistrates. However, in the face of repeated objection by the defendants he recused himself from the proceedings.

He was re-elected President of the Halifax Conservative Union in 1901 and continued in that office until his death, and was a prominent speaker on issues that he regarded as important for local commerce and industry such as trade unionism, workmen's compensation and, in particular, tariff reform He was elected President of the Halifax Chamber of Commerce in 1907, and was Chairman of James Royston Son & Company Limited (incorporated in 1898) until his death when the company's employees numbered more than three hundred.

== Family and death ==
He had been in indifferent health for some time before undergoing a medical procedure on the morning of 31 October 1908 and he died that afternoon at his home, Woodroyde, Savile Park, Halifax. He was buried in All Saints' Churchyard at Salterhebble. His fortune at death was a modest £4,658.

He was twice married: his first wife died suddenly in July 1891, and he remarried in 1901. By his first marriage he had a daughter and a son. The son, Charles Comber Arnold (1856–1913), was called to the Bar eighteen months after his father, joined him on the Halifax bench of magistrates in 1892, and worked with him in the wire business. The sole grandson, Capt. Alfred Huntriss Arnold, West Yorkshire Regiment, died at the age of 24 in 1916 from wounds sustained a year earlier during the Battle of Neuve Chapelle.

Parliament of the United Kingdom
Preceded by Sir James Stansfeld and William Rawson Shaw	Member of Parliament for Halifax; 1895–1900; With: William Rawson Shaw to 1895; Alfred Billson from 1897	Succeeded by Sir Savile Crossley and John Henry Whitley
