= John Lister (philanthropist) =

English politician (1847–1933)

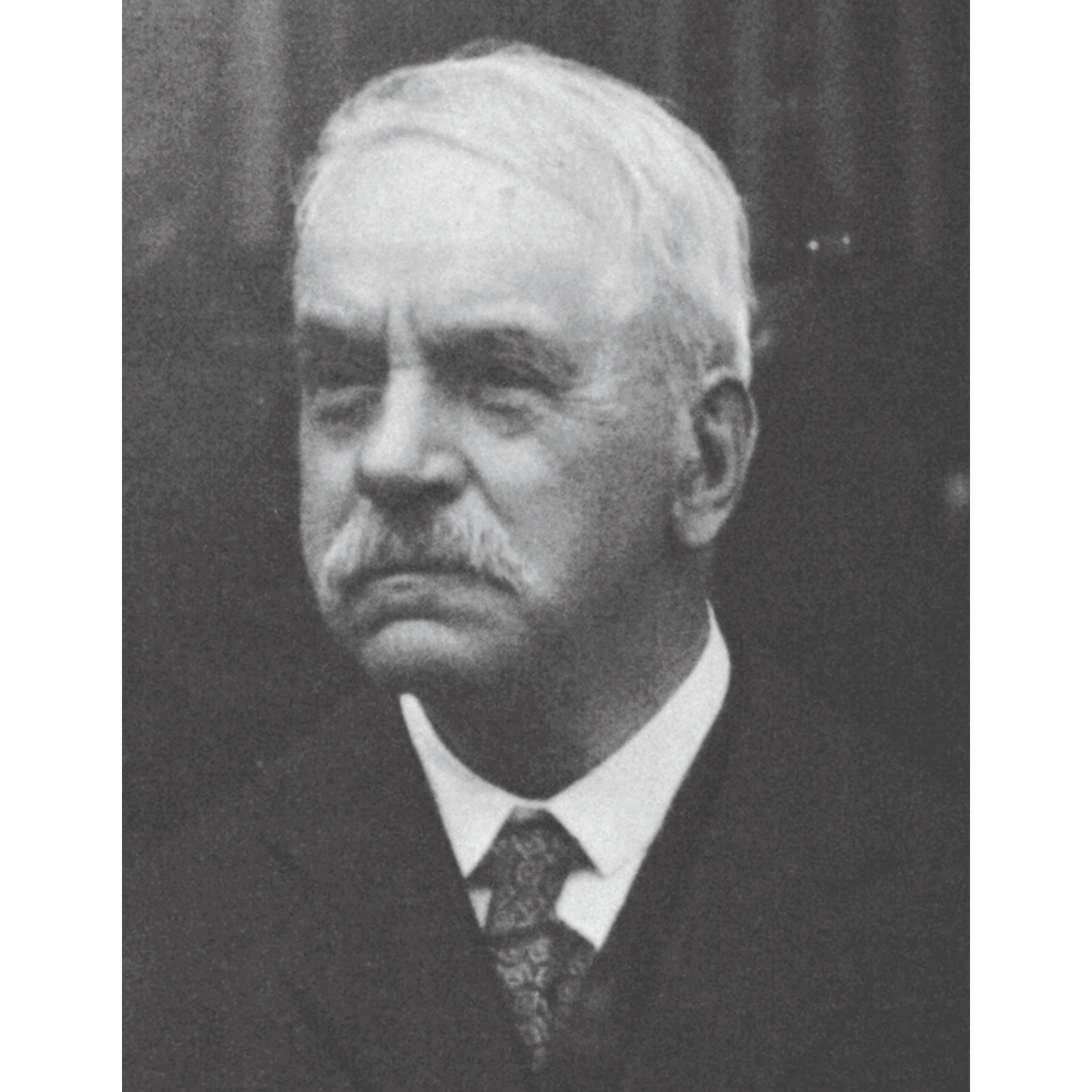
John Lister (1847–1933)

John Lister (8 March 1847 – 12 October 1933) was an English philanthropist and politician.

John Lister was born in Marylebone, Middlesex, to John and Louisa Ann (née Grant) Lister. He had two younger siblings named Charles and Anne. They were related to nineteenth-century diarist Anne Lister: his father was the descendant of a brother of Anne Lister's paternal grandfather.

Lister grew up in Sandown on the Isle of Wight and Halifax in the West Riding of Yorkshire. He attended Winchester College, then Brasenose College at the University of Oxford and finally Inner Temple, where he qualified as a barrister. He was a homosexual bachelor.

Lister was influenced by the Oxford Movement and in 1871 joined the Roman Catholic Church. In 1873, he was elected to Halifax Town Council for the Liberal Party. In 1882, he founded the Catholic Working Men's Association.

Increasingly influenced by Christian socialism, Lister joined the Fabian Society in 1891. He was a founder member of the Halifax Labour Union, for which he was re-elected to the Town Council in 1892. He joined the Independent Labour Party (ILP) on its formation the following year, becoming its first treasurer. Lister stood for the group at the 1893 Halifax by-election, taking 25% of the votes cast. He again stood for Halifax at the 1895 general election, but fared less well, and left the ILP and his elected posts in 1895.

== Deciphering and preserving Anne Lister's diaries ==
In his remaining years, Lister focused on managing his estate at Shibden Hall and on local history. With his friend Arthur Burrell he deciphered the code used by his ancestor Anne Lister in her diaries. When the content of the secret passages was revealed, Burrell advised John Lister to burn all the diaries. Lister did not take this advice, but as instead continued to hide Anne Lister's diaries behind a panel at Shibden Hall. In 2011, Anne Lister's diaries were added to the register of the UNESCO Memory of the World Programme. The register citation notes that, while a valuable account of the times, it was the "comprehensive and painfully honest account of lesbian life and reflections on her nature, however, which have made these diaries unique. They have shaped and continue to shape the direction of UK Gender Studies and Women's History."

Party political offices
Preceded by New post	Treasurer of the Independent Labour Party; 1893–1895	Succeeded by France Littlewood
