= James Parker (British politician) =

British politician

James Parker CH
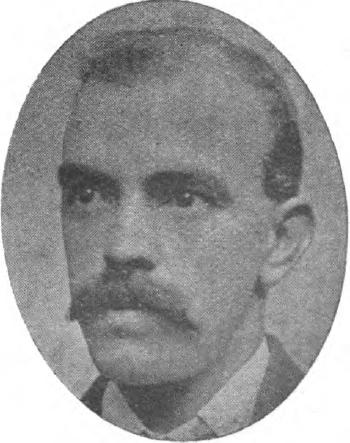
- Parker in the mid 1900s

Deputy Leader of the Labour Party
- In office 13 February 1912 – 9 February 1914
- Leader: Ramsay MacDonald
- Preceded by: William Brace
- Succeeded by: Alfred Henry Gill

Member of Parliament for Cannock
- In office 14 December 1918 – 15 November 1922
- Preceded by: Constituency Established
- Succeeded by: William Adamson

Member of Parliament for Halifax
- In office 8 February 1906 – 14 December 1918 Serving with John Henry Whitley
- Preceded by: Savile Crossley
- Succeeded by: Second seat abolished

Personal details
- Born: 1863
- Died: 11 February 1948 (aged 84–85)
- Party: Labour (–1922); Independent (1922)
- Other political affiliations: Coalition Labour

James Parker, CH (1863 – 11 February 1948) was a British Labour Party politician.

== Political career ==
He was elected as Member of Parliament (MP) for Halifax at the 1906 general election, and held the seat until the town's representation was reduced to one seat at the 1918 general election. He did not stand again in Halifax, but instead stood in the Cannock division of Staffordshire, as a Coalition Labour candidate (i.e. a holder of the coalition coupon, supporting the Lloyd George's coalition government). He won the seat, but lost it, standing as an independent but supporting the National Liberal at the 1922 general election.

Parker was made a Member of the Order of the Companions of Honour by King George V in 1918.

Parliament of the United Kingdom
Preceded by Sir Savile Crossley; John Henry Whitley	Member of Parliament for Halifax; 1906 – 1918; With: John Henry Whitley one seat from 1918	Succeeded by John Henry Whitley
New constituency	Member of Parliament for Cannock; 1918 – 1922	Succeeded by William Adamson
