= William Rawson Shaw =

William Rawson Shaw

William Rawson Shaw (1 May 1860 – 14 April 1932) was an English Liberal politician who represented Halifax.

Shaw was the son of Thomas Shaw and his wife Elizabeth Rawson. His father was chairman of the family firm of John Shaw & Sons who owned the Brookroyd Mills, and was MP for Halifax. In 1881 his father endowed the Rawson Shaw Scholarships in Halifax to commemorate his coming of age.

On the death of his father in 1893, Shaw was elected as Member of Parliament MP for Halifax in West Yorkshire. He was re-elected in 1895 but resigned his seat in 1897.

Shaw moved to Rustington, Sussex, where he was Chairman of Arundel County Bench for 14 years and active in community activities.

Shaw married Mary Josephine Crook, only daughter of Joseph Crook, MP for Bolton on 25 April 1888. They had a daughter and a son Kenneth who became a pilot in World War I.

Parliament of the United Kingdom
Preceded by Sir James Stansfeld and Thomas Shaw	Member of Parliament for Halifax; 1893–1897; With: Sir James Stansfeld, to 1895; Sir Alfred Arnold, from 1895	Succeeded by Sir Alfred Arnold and Alfred Billson
