= Gilbert Gledhill =

British politician (1889–1946)

Gilbert Gledhill (22 May 1889 – 2 September 1946) was a Conservative Party politician in the United Kingdom, and a member of parliament (MP) from 1931 to 1945.

He contested the 1929 general election in the West Yorkshire constituency of Halifax, but lost by over 7,000 votes to the Labour incumbent Arthur Longbottom.

When the Labour Party split at the 1931 general election over Prime Minister Ramsay MacDonald's formation of a National Government, Gledhill won the Halifax seat with a majority of over 20,000 votes. He represented the constituency until his defeat by Dryden Brook in the Labour landslide at the 1945 general election.

In the 1934, he was appointed the first president of the British Sales Promotion Association, now known as the Institute of Sales Promotion.

Parliament of the United Kingdom
Preceded by Arthur Longbottom	Member of Parliament for Halifax; 1931–1945	Succeeded by Dryden Brook
