= Alfred Billson (British politician) =

British politician (1839–1907)

Sir Alfred Billson
- Billson in 1899

Member of Parliament
- In office 1906 – 9 July 1907
- Preceded by: James Heath
- Succeeded by: Albert Stanley
- Constituency: North West Staffordshire
- In office 1897–1900 Serving with Alfred Arnold
- Preceded by: William Rawson Shaw; Alfred Arnold
- Succeeded by: Savile Crossley; John Henry Whitley
- Constituency: Halifax
- In office 1892–1895
- Preceded by: George Pitt-Lewis
- Succeeded by: Cameron Gull
- Constituency: Barnstaple

Personal details
- Born: 18 April 1839 Leicester, England
- Died: 9 July 1907 (aged 68) London, England
- Party: Liberal
- Spouse: Lilla (m. 1862)
- Children: 4

Sir Alfred Billson (18 April 1839 – 9 July 1907) was a Liberal Party politician in the United Kingdom.

Born in Leicester, he was fifth son of William Billson. He was admitted a solicitor in 1860, and moved to Liverpool, where he became partner in the law firm of Oliver Jones, Billson, and Company. He became a J.P. for the city, and was active in local Liberal politics as secretary of South West Lancashire Liberal Association from 1866 to 1884, and of Liverpool's Liberal Association.

Billson was elected as Member of Parliament (MP) for three different constituencies: from 1892 to 1895 for Barnstaple in Devon, from a by-election in 1897 to the 1900 General Election for Halifax in West Yorkshire, and from the 'Liberal landslide' 1906 General Election, until his death in 1907, for North West Staffordshire, after defeating a Conservative Member. He had also unsuccessfully contested Conservative-held Bradford East in 1896, being defeated by the Honourable Ronald Greville.

Billson married in 1862 Lilla, daughter of John Baines of Leicester, and had one son and three daughters.

Later in his life he began to live in Shropshire at Rowton Castle as tenant of its then landlord, Baron Rowton, with whom he enjoyed friendship despite political differences, Rowton having been a close Conservative associate of Disraeli. He was an active supporter of Liberal associations in the mainly Conservative-voting county, and served as member of the Atcham Rural District Council and Alberbury Parish Council.

In June 1907 he was knighted in King Edward VII's Birthday Honours List although he did not live to receive the accolade. He died suddenly, on 9 July 1907, in the House of Commons when he collapsed in the 'Aye' lobby to cast his vote on sugar duty legislation, aged 68. After cremation at Golders Green Crematorium, his ashes were buried in Kensal Green Cemetery. A future Liberal MP, Congregationalist minister Silvester Horne, officiated. A plaque was placed in his memory in St Michael's Parish Church, Alberbury, near his Rowton Castle home.

Parliament of the United Kingdom
Preceded by George Pitt-Lewis	Member of Parliament for Barnstaple; 1892 – 1895	Succeeded by Sir Sir William Cameron Gull, Bt
Preceded by William Rawson Shaw and Sir Alfred Arnold	Member of Parliament for Halifax; 1897 – 1900; With: Sir Alfred Arnold	Succeeded by Sir Savile Crossley and John Henry Whitley
Preceded by Sir James Heath	Member of Parliament for North West Staffordshire; 1906 – 1907	Succeeded by Albert Stanley
