= Arthur Longbottom (politician) =

Arthur William Longbottom (25 May 1883 – 12 September 1943) was a Labour Party politician in the United Kingdom.

Born at Skircoat Green, near Halifax, Longbottom was educated at All Saints' National School and the Halifax Technical College. He worked as a railway townsman, and became active in the Labour Party.

Longbottom served on Halifax County Borough Council from 1912, and as Mayor of Halifax in 1923. He was elected as member of parliament for Halifax at a by-election in July 1928 in the West Yorkshire seat of Halifax, following the resignation of the Speaker of the House of Commons, John Henry Whitley, who had represented the seat as a Liberal since 1900.

He held the seat with an increased majority at the 1929 general election. However, when Labour's vote collapsed at the 1931 general election, he lost the seat to the Conservative Gilbert Gledhill. He stood again in 1935, but failed to regain the seat.

Parliament of the United Kingdom
Preceded by John Henry Whitley	Member of Parliament for Halifax; 1928–1931	Succeeded by Gilbert Gledhill
