= John Henry Whitley =

British politician (1866–1935)

The Right Honourable John Henry Whitley
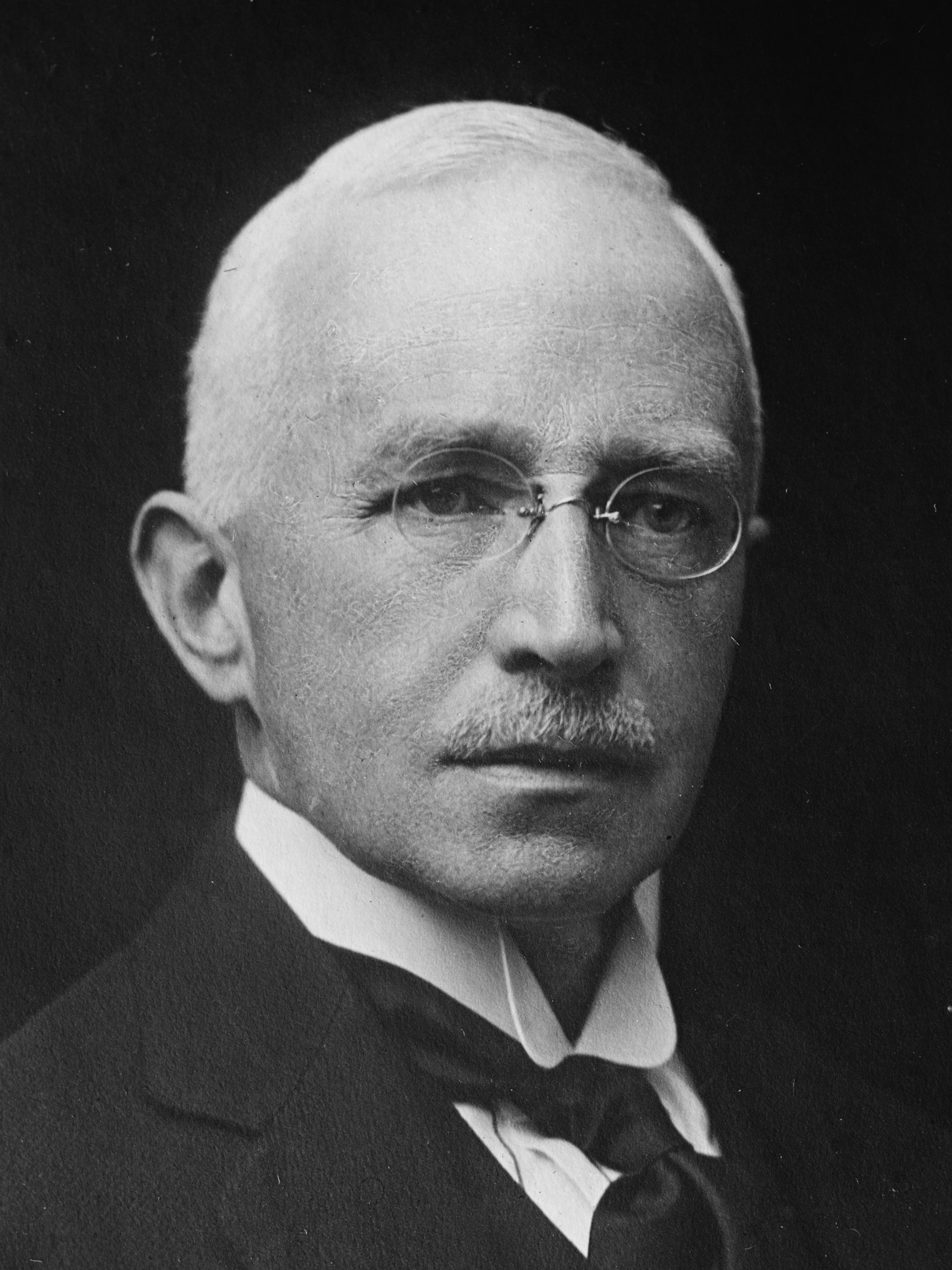
- Whitley in 1915

Speaker of the House of Commons of the United Kingdom
- In office 28 April 1921 – 20 June 1928
- Monarch: George V
- Prime Minister: David Lloyd George; Bonar Law; Stanley Baldwin; Ramsay MacDonald; Stanley Baldwin
- Preceded by: James Lowther
- Succeeded by: Edward FitzRoy

Deputy Speaker of the House of Commons Chairman of Ways and Means
- In office 25 October 1911 – 28 April 1921
- Monarch: George V
- Speaker: James Lowther
- Preceded by: Alfred Emmott
- Succeeded by: James Hope

Deputy Chairman of Ways and Means
- In office 1 March 1910 – 25 October 1911
- Speaker: James Lowther
- Preceded by: James Caldwell
- Succeeded by: Donald Maclean

Lord Commissioner of the Treasury
- In office 27 February 1907 – 20 February 1910
- Prime Minister: Henry Campbell-Bannerman; H. H. Asquith
- Preceded by: John Fuller
- Succeeded by: William Wedgwood Benn

Member of Parliament for Halifax
- In office 24 October 1900 – 20 June 1928
- Preceded by: Alfred Billson
- Succeeded by: Arthur Longbottom

Personal details
- Born: 8 February 1866 Halifax, Yorkshire, UK
- Died: 3 February 1935 (aged 68) Halifax, Yorkshire, UK
- Resting place: Lister Lane Cemetery, Halifax, UK; 53.7223°N 1.8741°W
- Party: Liberal

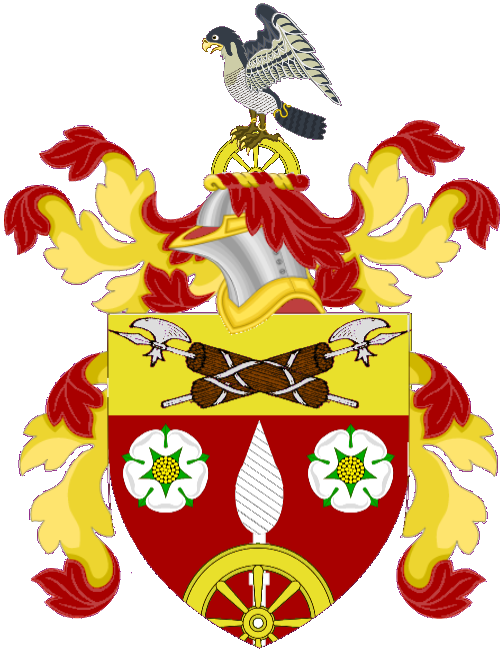
Arms as displayed in Speaker's House.

John Henry Whitley (8 February 1866 – 3 February 1935), often known as J. H. Whitley, was a British politician and Georgist. He was the final Liberal to serve as Speaker of the House of Commons, a role he held from 1921 to 1928.

== Family and early career ==
Whitley was born in Halifax, Yorkshire, on 8 February 1866 son of Nathan Whitley (1830–1889) from Ovenden. Nathan went on to serve as Mayor of Halifax (1876–1877), succeeding his cousin-in-law Edward Crossley, the son of Joseph Crossley (1813–1868), a partner in John Crossley & Sons carpet factory, Halifax.

After an early education boarding at Wiseman's House, Clifton College, Whitley entered his uncle Samuel Whitley's cotton spinning business, S. Whitley & Co. at Hanson Lane Mills, Skircoat, Halifax. Nathan was a partner in the business and took over after Samuel's death in 1884.

In 1892, Whitley married Margherita (Margaret) Virginia Marchetti. Margherita was born in Putney in 1872, a daughter of an Italian, Giulio (Julian) Marchetti, who had served as an officer under Garibaldi before settling in England to marry Anne Crossley in Halifax in 1871 and take his place in the carpet manufacturing business.

They had two daughters and two sons: Margaret Phyllis b.1895; Percival Nathan b.1893; Monica Virginia b.1903; and Oliver John b.1912. Margherita died in 1925 and John Henry remarried in 1928 to Helen Clarke in Chelsea.

== Political career ==
=== Pre-war ===
Whitley became Liberal Member of Parliament (MP) for Halifax in 1900, a seat he held until he resigned in 1928. He served as Junior Lord of the Treasury from 1907 to 1910 in the Liberal Government 1905-1915. He was appointed Deputy Chairman of Ways and Means 1910–1911, Privy Counsellor in 1911 and he held the role of Chairman of Ways and Means, Deputy Speaker of the House of Commons, from 1911 to 1921.

=== Whitley Councils ===
During World War I, in 1917, Whitley was appointed to chair a committee to report on 'the Relations of Employers and Employees' in the wake of the establishment of the Shop Stewards Movement and the widespread protest action against dilution. The smooth running of industry was vital to the war effort so maintaining good industrial relations was a priority.

He proposed a system of regular formal consultative meetings between workers and employers, known to this day as "Whitley Councils". These would be empowered to cover any issue related to pay and conditions of service, and to take matters through to arbitration if necessary. This was a strong model which was to influence industrial relations beyond the UK.

The intention was to establish Whitley councils in the private sector, in particular in those industries most affected by the strike wave – to offset the demand for 'workers' control' – a demand which was rapidly gaining ground after the Russian revolution.

However, the councils failed to gain ground in coal, cotton, engineering and other heavy industries, but succeeded only in the sphere of government employment where they remain a major feature of public sector industrial relations to this day.

=== Speaker ===
Mr. Speaker's Retirement Act 1928 (Note: Section 2.)
- Act of Parliament
- Parliament of the United Kingdom
- Long title: An Act to settle and secure an annuity upon the Right Honourable John Henry Whitley in consideration of his eminent services.
- Citation: 18 & 19 Geo. 5. c. 16
- Territorial extent: United Kingdom

Dates
- Royal assent: 3 August 1928
- Commencement: 3 August 1928 (Note: The Acts of Parliament (Commencement) Act 1793.)
- Repealed: 23 May 1950
Other legislation
Repealed by	c

Status: Repealed

Text of statute as originally enacted

Whitley was appointed Speaker of the House of Commons in 1921, a post he held until 1928, when he resigned on grounds of ill health. He refused the customary peerage offered by the monarch – breaking a tradition that had originated in 1789.

Some notable portraits of Whitley were commissioned during this period, with paintings by both William Rothenstein and Glyn Warren Philpot.

=== Post-Parliament ===
Despite resigning as MP and Speaker, his political work continued. He chaired the Royal Commission on Labour in India, which reported in 1931. The report surprised many by concurring with the criticisms of Mahatma Gandhi and others that poverty was the cause of India's social and industrial problems. It was also critical of British employers' role in perpetuating the problems.

Whitley was offered a knighthood for his work on this report, but again, he, like a minority of others, declined.

== BBC ==
His friendship with John Reith led to his appointment as Chairman of the Board of Governors of the BBC in 1930. In 1932, he made the first broadcast on the Empire Service, which developed into the World Service. He held the Chairmanship until his death.

== Death and burial ==
Whitley died on 3 February 1935, aged 68, shortly before his 69th birthday. He is buried in Plot 456, Lister Lane Cemetery, Halifax.

== Works ==
- Whitley, John Henry (1918). The Great Alternative; Saner Politics or Revolution. General Books LLC. ISBN 1-154-17365-8.
- Whitley, John Henry (1918). Chapman, S.J. (ed.). (Introduction): Labor and Capital after the War. Kessinger. p. 296. ISBN 978-1-104-21032-8.

=== The John Henry Whitley archive ===
The personal archive of John Henry Whitley was donated to the Archives and Special Collections of the University of Huddersfield in 2012.

== Honours ==
A blue plaque was to Whitley erected by the Halifax Civic Trust.

== Notes ==
Parliament of the United Kingdom
Preceded by Alfred Billson and Alfred Arnold	Member of Parliament for Halifax; 1900–1928; With: Sir Savile Crossley, to 1906; James Parker, 1906–1918 one seat from 1918	Succeeded by Arthur Longbottom
Preceded by James Caldwell	Deputy Chairman of Ways and Means; 1910–1911	Succeeded by Sir Donald Maclean
Preceded by Alfred Emmott	Chairman of Ways and Means; 1911–1921	Succeeded by James Hope
Preceded by James Lowther	Speaker of the House of Commons; 1921–1928	Succeeded by Edward FitzRoy
Media offices
Preceded by George Villiers	Chairman of the BBC Board of Governors; 1930–1935	Succeeded by William Bridgeman
