= John Dyson Hutchinson =

English politician

John Dyson Hutchinson (6 July 1822 – 25 August 1882) was an English Liberal politician who sat in the House of Commons from 1877 to 1882.

Hutchinson was educated at Hipperholme Grammar School. He was active in business in Halifax and was a proprietor of the Halifax Courier. He was twice Mayor of Halifax, and was a J.P. for the town.

In 1877 Hutchinson was elected Member of Parliament for Halifax. He held the seat until 1882 when he resigned shortly before his death at the age of 60.
