= Somerleyton, Ashby and Herringfleet =

Civil parish in Suffolk, England

Coordinates: 52.526°N 1.664°E

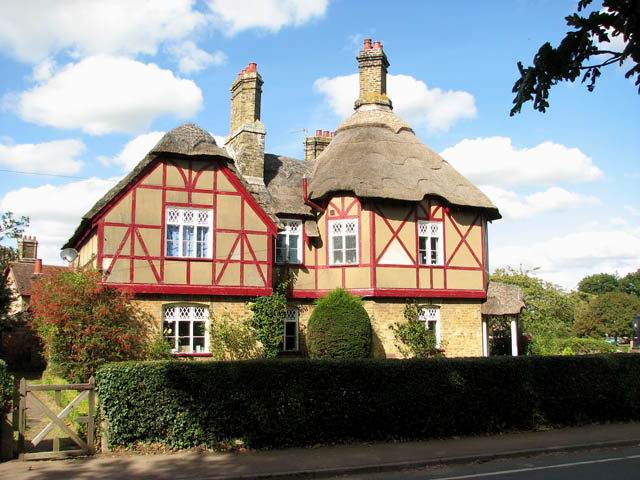
- Cottages in Somerleyton

- Location within Suffolk
- Area: 14 km^{2} (5.4 sq mi)
- Population: 427 (2011)
  - Density: 31/km^{2} (80/sq mi)
- OS grid reference: TM486982
- District: East Suffolk
- Shire county: Suffolk
- Region: East
- Country: England
- Sovereign state: United Kingdom
- Post town: Lowestoft
- Postcode district: NR32
- Dialling code: 01502
- UK Parliament: Waveney
- Website: http://www.ashvillages.org.uk

Somerleyton, Ashby and Herringfleet is a civil parish in the north of the English county of Suffolk. It is 5 miles (8.0 km) north-west of Lowestoft and the same distance south-west of Great Yarmouth and is in the East Suffolk district. The parish is made up of the villages of Somerleyton, Ashby and Herringfleet and at the 2011 United Kingdom census had a population of 427.

The three villages were each a separate parish until 1987 when they were combined into the current parish.

The parish is on the county border with Norfolk, with the western border formed by the River Waveney and the north by Fritton Decoy. It borders the Suffolk parishes of Blundeston and Lound and the Norfolk parishes of Burgh St Peter, Wheatacre, Aldeby and Haddiscoe across the Waveney and the parishes of Fritton and St Olaves and Belton with Browston to the north.

The village of St Olaves was formerly part of the parish of Herringfleet until local government reorganisation in 1974 redrew the county boundary. Prior to this the entire area south and east of the Waveney, including Fritton and the three parishes which make up the modern parish of Somerleyton, Ashby and Herringfleet, was part of Suffolk.

== Culture and community ==
Somerleyton is the largest of the three villages which make up the parish, with a population of around 300. It includes the Somerleyton Estate, which is a major landowner within the wider parish. The village was rebuilt during the 19th-century at the direction of Samuel Morton Peto, a railway developer who owned Somerleyton Hall. The design of the village was based on Blaise Hamlet near Bristol and was designed by John Thomas who also rebuilt Somerleyton Hall. Ashby and Herringfleet are both sparsely populated, each with populations of around 50, mainly on scattered farms.

Somerleyton has a primary school, built as part of the development of the model village, a village hall and playing field as well as the parish's only remaining public house, the Dukes Head. Each of the former parish churches remain active. In the 1950s, Christopher Cockerell designed and tested the first hovercraft at his boatyard in the village. A column was erected in the village in 2010 on the 100th anniversary of Cockerell's birth.

The Lowestoft to Norwich railway line runs through the parish close to the Waveney. Somerleyton railway station has operated since 1847. The lines passes close to Cockerell's boatyard, Somerleyton Marina, and Herringfleet Windmill, both of which are within The Broads national park.
