= List of museums in Suffolk =

This list of museums in Suffolk, England contains museums which are defined for this context as institutions (including nonprofit organizations, government entities, and private businesses) that collect and care for objects of cultural, artistic, scientific, or historical interest and make their collections or related exhibits available for public viewing. Also included are non-profit art galleries and university art galleries. Museums that exist only in cyberspace (i.e., virtual museums) are not included.

== Museums ==
Name	Image	Town/City	Region	Type	Summary
Aldeburgh Museum		Aldeburgh	East Suffolk	Local	located in the 16th century moot hall, local history, culture, trades, industry
Alfred Corry Lifeboat Museum		Southwold	East Suffolk	Maritime	home to the former Southwold lifeboat "Alfred Corry", exhibits and artefacts about lifesaving and area maritime history
Amber Shop and Museum		Southwold	East Suffolk	Natural history	shop with museum about amber, and amber artefacts, carvings, jewellery and objets d'art
The Apex		Bury St Edmunds	West Suffolk	Art	performing arts centre, includes Apex Art Gallery for contemporary art exhibitions
Bardwell Windmill		Bardwell	West Suffolk	Mill	Early 19th-century tower windmill
Bawdsey Manor		Bawdsey	East Suffolk	Military	Features the Transmitter Block and "Magic Ear" exhibit about RAF Bawdsey and the radar activities during World War II and the Cold War
Beccles & District Museum		Beccles	East Suffolk	Local	local history, culture
Bentwaters Cold War Museum		Woodbridge	East Suffolk	Military	History of RAF Bentwaters in World War II and the Cold War
Brandon Heritage Centre		Brandon	West Suffolk	Local	local history, culture
Bungay Museum		Bungay	East Suffolk	Local	local history, culture
Buttrum's Mill		Woodbridge	East Suffolk	Mill	Mid-19th-century tower windmill
Christchurch Mansion		Ipswich	Ipswich	Multiple	Stately home with fine art, decorative arts in period room displays, toys and dolls
Clare Ancient House Museum		Clare	West Suffolk	Local	14th-15th-century house with exhibits of local history and archaeology
Clifford Road Tunnels		Ipswich	Ipswich	History	World War II underground air raid shelter with period supplies and artefacts
Dunwich Museum		Dunwich	East Suffolk	Local	local history, culture, story of its decline due to coastal erosion
East Anglia Transport Museum		Carlton Colville	East Suffolk	Transportation	Historic public transport vehicles including buses, trams and trolleybuses, a narrow gauge railway
Easton Farm Park		Easton	East Suffolk	Farm	
Euston Hall		Euston	West Suffolk	Historic house	17th century manor, collection of fine art, park by William Kent and Capability Brown
Felixstowe Museum		Felixstowe	East Suffolk	Multiple	Area military and social history, located in Landguard Fort
Flatford: Bridge Cottage		Flatford	Babergh	Historic house	Operated by the National Trust, 16th-century thatched cottage with exhibits about John Constable and his paintings of the area
Framlingham Castle		Framlingham	East Suffolk	Historic house	Operated by English Heritage, 12th-century fortress remains, exhibits about its history
Gainsborough's House		Sudbury	Babergh	Art	Birthplace of artist Thomas Gainsborough, collection of his paintings, drawings and prints, temporary art exhibitions
Greene King Visitor Centre		Bury St Edmunds	West Suffolk	Food	History, artefacts and shop of the brewery
Halesworth Museum		Halesworth	East Suffolk	Local	local history, located in the Halesworth railway station
Haverhill Local History Centre		Haverhill	West Suffolk	Local	local history, located in the Haverhill Arts Centre
Herringfleet Windmill		Herringfleet	East Suffolk	Mill	Early 19th century smock windmill
HMS Ganges Museum		Bures	Babergh	Maritime	history and artefacts from the training ships associated with the shore establishment HMS Ganges
Ickworth House, Park & Garden		Bury St Edmunds	West Suffolk	Historic house	Operated by the National Trust, country house with collections of paintings, portraits, Regency furniture, Huguenot silver and more, gardens and park
Ipswich Art School Gallery		Ipswich	Ipswich	Art	
Ipswich Maritime Trust Window Museum		Ipswich	Ipswich	Maritime	window exhibits of town's maritime heritage
Ipswich Museum		Ipswich	Ipswich	Multiple	Archaeology, Roman Britain and Ancient Egypt, local history, natural history, ethnography
Ipswich Transport Museum		Ipswich	Ipswich	Transportation	Area transportation history, includes buses, trams, commercial vehicles, fire apparatus, mobile cranes, bicycles, horse-drawn vehicles, prams and wheelchairs, most manufactured in the area
Kentwell Hall		Long Melford	Babergh	Historic house	Elizabethan stately home and outbuildings with a rare breeds farm and gardens
Landguard Fort		Felixstowe	East Suffolk	Military	Historic fort in use since the 16th century until the 1950s, also includes the Felixstowe Museum
Lanman Museum		Framlingham	East Suffolk	Local	https://lanmanmuseum.uk/ website, located at Framlingham Castle, local history, history of the castle, agriculture, social history
Lavenham Guildhall		Lavenham	Babergh	History	Operated by the National Trust, medieval guild hall with exhibits on the local cloth industry, farming and agriculture
Laxfield & District Museum		Laxfield	Mid Suffolk	Military	
Little Hall Lavenham		Lavenham	Babergh	Historic house	14th century Tudor house
Long Shop Museum		Leiston	East Suffolk	Industry	History of Richard Garrett & Sons a manufacturer of agricultural machinery, steam engines and trolleybuses.
Lowestoft Maritime Museum		Lowestoft	East Suffolk	Maritime	maritime artefacts, ship models, marine art, fishing and fishing industry, activities with the Royal Navy in WW II, shipwrights and coopers tools
Lowestoft Museum		Lowestoft	East Suffolk	Local	local history, 18th-century Lowestoft Porcelain, fossils, maritime heritage, industries, culture, social history
Lowestoft War Memorial Museum		Lowestoft	East Suffolk	Military	Area military history during World War I and World War II
Martlesham Heath Control Tower Museum		Woodbridge	East Suffolk	Aviation	history of RAF Martlesham Heath
Mechanical Music Museum at Cotton		Cotton	Mid Suffolk	Music	collection of automatic musical instruments and cinema memorabilia
Melford Hall		Long Melford	Babergh	Historic house	Operated by the National Trust, stately home reflecting two centuries of family life, ties to Beatrix Potter
Mid-Suffolk Light Railway Museum		Wetheringsett	Mid Suffolk	Railway	Heritage railway and museum with locomotives, artefacts
Mildenhall Museum		Mildenhall	West Suffolk	Local	local history, natural wildlife, the history of RAF Mildenhall, replicas of the Mildenhall Treasure, archaeology
Mincarlo		Lowestoft	East Suffolk	Maritime	Sidewinder fishing trawler museum ship
Moyse's Hall Museum		Bury St Edmunds	West Suffolk	Multiple	local history, culture, clocks and watches, costumes and textiles, fine and decorative arts, Suffolk Regiment gallery
Museum of East Anglian Life		Stowmarket	Mid Suffolk	Open air	Agricultural history of East Anglia, includes Eastbridge Windpump, agriculture machinery, scenes from the 1950s including shops scenes, kitchens, living rooms and a Victorian schoolroom, blacksmith forge, trades, watermill, chapel, carpentry and engineering workshops, steam engines
Museum of Knots and Sailors' Ropework		Ipswich	Ipswich	Maritime	open by appointment, art and skill of ropeworking
National Horseracing Museum		Newmarket	West Suffolk	Sports	History of horse racing in Britain, houses the British Horseracing Hall of Fame and the Vestey Gallery of British Sporting Art
Norfolk and Suffolk Aviation Museum		Flixton	East Suffolk	Aviation	Historic aircraft, history of RAF Bungay and regimental collections of the units that served there, area aviation history, aviation history and artefacts from World War II
Orford Castle		Orford	East Suffolk	Historic house	Operated by English Heritage, medieval castle keep, houses the Orford Museum's' exhibits of local archaeological artefacts, the castle's history and borough regalia
Pakenham Windmill		Pakenham	West Suffolk	Mill	Mid-19th-century tower windmill
Parham Airfield Museum		Framlingham	East Suffolk	Military	History of the airfield's activities in World War II, in particular the 390th Bombardment Group and the British Resistance Organisation
Rougham Control Tower Museum		Bury St Edmunds	West Suffolk	Military	restored World War II control tower and Quonset hut with exhibits and memorabilia of RAF Bury St Edmunds
Royal Naval Patrol Service Museum		Lowestoft	East Suffolk	Maritime	history of the Royal Naval Patrol Service and their local activities in World War II
Saxmundham Museum		Saxmundham	East Suffolk	Local	local history, replica of local shops, jail cell, culture exhibits
Saxtead Green Post Windmill		Framlingham	East Suffolk	Mill	Operated by English Heritage, 19th century post windmill
Smith's Row		Bury St Edmunds	West Suffolk	Art	, contemporary art gallery
Somerleyton Hall		Somerleyton	East Suffolk	Historic house	Tudor-Jacobean stately home, gardens
Southwold Lighthouse		Southwold	East Suffolk	Maritime	Lighthouse museum
Southwold Museum		Southwold	East Suffolk	Local	local history, natural history, geology, industries, railway, maritime heritage, archaeology
Southwold Sailors' Reading Room		Southwold	East Suffolk	Maritime	marine art, photos, models and other memorabilia of the local fishermen and sailors
St Edmundsbury Cathedral		Bury St Edmunds	West Suffolk	Multiple	Historic cathedral, includes the Edmund Gallery for art exhibits, and the Cathedral Treasures exhibits of religious regalia and artefacts
Sudbury Heritage Centre & Museum		Sudbury	Babergh	Local	local history
Suffolk Regiment Museum		Bury St Edmunds	West Suffolk	Military	Regimental uniforms, weapons, artefacts and memorabilia
Suffolk Underwater Studies Museum		Orford	East Suffolk	Maritime	marine archaeology, items recovered from the ocean,
Sutton Hoo		Woodbridge	East Suffolk	Archaeology	Operated by the National Trust, artefacts from the ship burial of an Anglo-Saxon king and his most treasured possessions
Thelnetham Windmill		Thelnetham	West Suffolk	Mill	Early 19th-century tower windmill
Upthorpe Mill		Stanton	West Suffolk	Mill	Mid 18th century post windmill
West Stow Anglo-Saxon Village		West Stow	West Suffolk	Open air	Recreated Anglo-Saxon village, archaeological artefacts found at the site, exhibits of Anglo-Saxon life and culture
Woodbridge Museum		Woodbridge	East Suffolk	Local	local history, archaeology, trade, roads, housing, religion and education
Woodbridge Tide Mill		Woodbridge	East Suffolk	Mill	Operational tide mill
Woolpit Museum		Woolpit	Mid Suffolk	Local	local history, brickmaking, located in a 17th-century cottage

== Defunct museums ==
- Sue Ryder Foundation Museum, Cavendish, life and works of philanthropist Sue Ryder
- Suffolk Heavy Horse Museum, Woodbridge, history of the Suffolk Punch breed of draught horse
- William Clowes Printing Museum, Beccles

== See also ==
- Category:Tourist attractions in Suffolk
