= Ashby, Suffolk =

Former civil parish in Suffolk, England

Coordinates: 52.537°N 1.668°E

Ashby
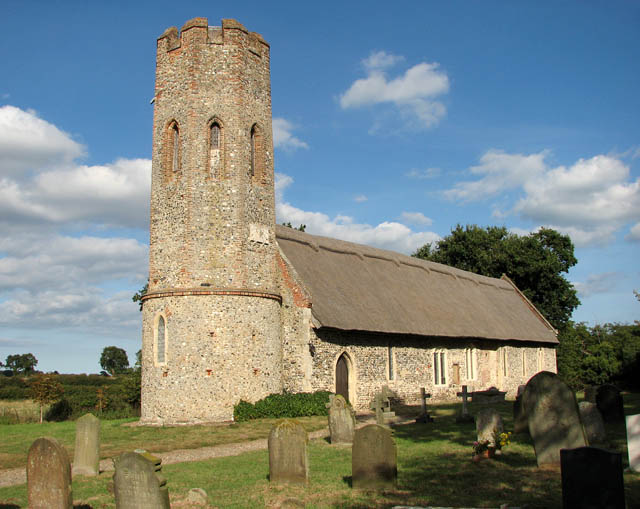
- St Mary's church

- Location within Suffolk
- Area: 4.2 km^{2} (1.6 sq mi)
- Population: 50 (2011 est.)
  - Density: 12/km^{2} (31/sq mi)
- OS grid reference: TM489997
- Civil parish: Somerleyton, Ashby and Herringfleet
- District: East Suffolk
- Shire county: Suffolk
- Region: East
- Country: England
- Sovereign state: United Kingdom
- Post town: Lowestoft
- Postcode district: NR32
- Dialling code: 01502
- UK Parliament: Waveney
- Website: http://www.ashvillages.org.uk/

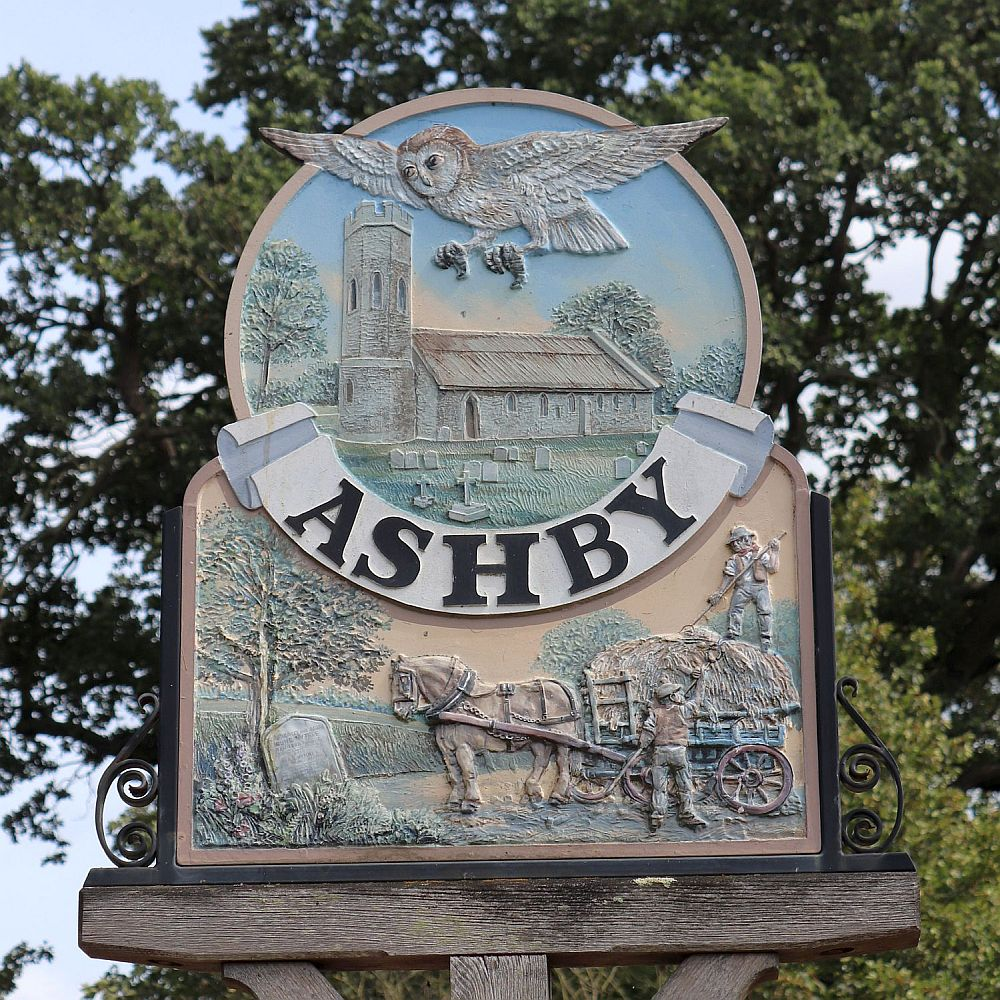
Ashby village sign, Suffolk

Ashby is a former civil parish, now in the parish of Somerleyton, Ashby and Herringfleet, in the East Suffolk district, in the north of the English county of Suffolk. It is 5 1/2 miles (8.9 km) north-west of Lowestoft.

The estimated population of Ashby was around 50 at the 2011 United Kingdom census. There is no village centre, with the population spread across a number of scattered farms and small settlements. The area has always been sparsely populated, with the former parish population never exceeding 110. At the 1981 United Kingdom census it had a population of 42. (Note: The 1981 census was the last time the population of Ashby as a parish was recorded.)

The county border with Norfolk is immediately north of Ashby. Fritton Decoy marks the northern border, with the Norfolk parishes of Belton with Browston and Fritton and St Olaves bordering Ashby. To the east it borders the Suffolk parish of Lound, with Herringfleet and Somerleyton to the west and south. Much of the land within the area of the former parish is owned by the Somerleyton Estate.

== History ==
Ashby is not named in the Domesday Book. By the 13th century it was owned by Sir John de Askby and is recorded as having 10 taxpayers in 1327. By the end of the 16th century the parish was owned by John Wentworth. Wentworth, who also owned a number of surrounding manors, enclosed the parish common in 1599 and the site near the parish church is the location of a possible deserted medieval village.

Admiral Sir Thomas Allin purchased the manor in 1672. A series of duck decoys are known to have been operated at Fritton Decoy from around this time. These continued to operate into the 19th century, at which time the estate was owned by railway developer Samuel Morton Peto and, from 1863, Francis Crossley. The population of the parish peaked at 110 at the 1881 United Kingdom census and declined throughout the 20th century.

During World War II an American B17 bomber crashed close to the parish church after a signal flare had exploded inside the plane. The crash, which occurred on 7 May 1944, killed five members of the crew. A memorial to these men, as well as two P47 fighter pilots killed in a collision over Fritton Decoy in April 1945, was erected on the edge the churchyard.

During the war parts of the parish around Fritton Decoy, were used for training ahead of the Normandy landings in 1944. The 79th Armoured Division used the site for the testing and development of amphibious DD tanks between 1943 and 1947. Part of the site is now used as a campsite by the Scout Association.

The parish was combined with Somerleyton and Herringfleet to form the combined parish of Somerleyton, Ashby and Herringfleet on 1 April 1987.

== Church of St Mary ==
The Church of England parish church of St Mary is in an isolated position about 1/2 mile (800 m) down a track, south of the hamlet. The church is built of local flint, with a small amount of red brick for quoins and repairs with stonework dating from the 13th century, although it is believed that there may have been a church on the site during the Anglo-Saxon period. The roof of the nave and chancel is thatched. It is one of around 40 round-tower churches in Suffolk. (Note: The exact number of round-tower churches in the county is a matter of debate. Some sources list 38, others cite between 40 and 43. They almost all date from the late Anglo-Saxon or early Norman periods and were mostly built between the 11th and 14th-centuries. There are around 183 round-tower churches in England, most of them in Norfolk, which has around 124, and Suffolk. Four of the churches now in Norfolk were previously in Suffolk before boundary changes in 1974.)

The oldest part of the building is the Purbeck Marble Norman baptismal font, which is 12th- or 13th-century. The nave and chancel of the church are 13th-century. The tower has a round base and is octagonal from about 5 feet (1.5 m) above ground level. It was probably rebuilt early in the 16th century. The church is a Grade I listed building.
