= Lound, Suffolk =

Village in Suffolk, England

Coordinates: 52.530°N 1.692°E

Lound
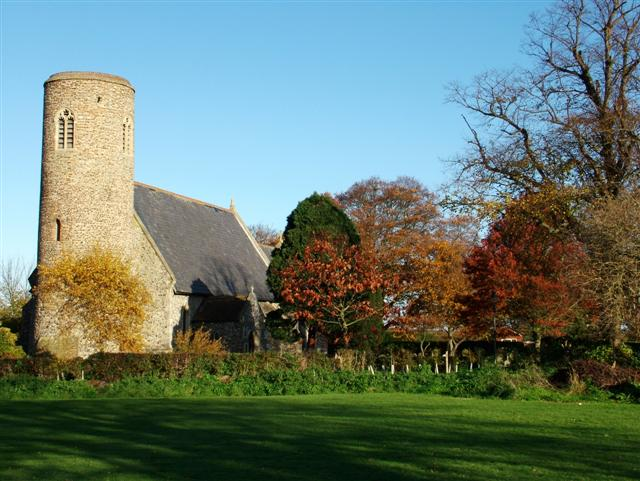
- Church of St John the Baptist

- Location within Suffolk
- Area: 5 km^{2} (1.9 sq mi)
- Population: 359 (2011)
  - Density: 72/km^{2} (190/sq mi)
- OS grid reference: TM505989
- District: East Suffolk
- Shire county: Suffolk
- Region: East
- Country: England
- Sovereign state: United Kingdom
- Post town: Lowestoft
- Postcode district: NR32
- Dialling code: 01502
- UK Parliament: Waveney

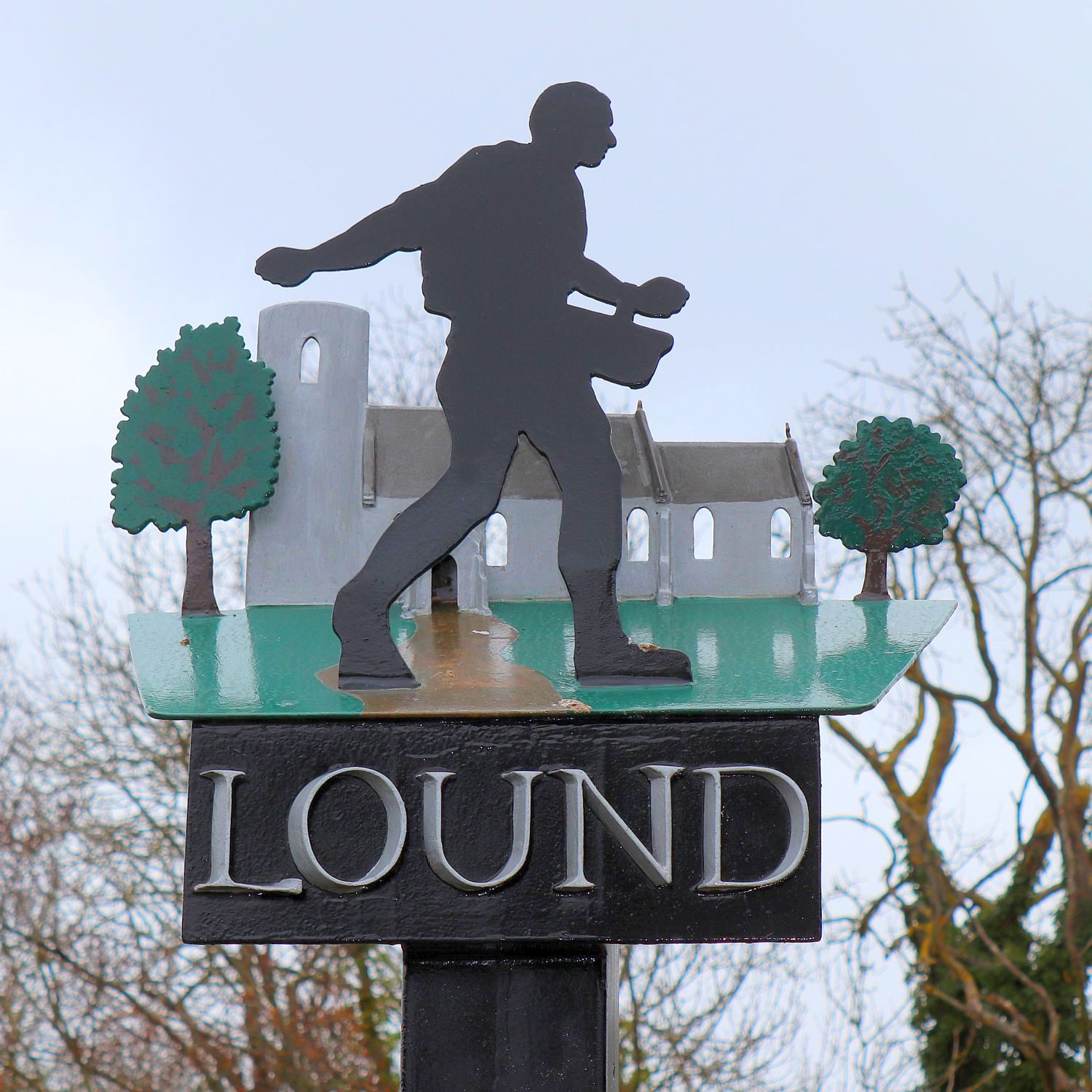
Lound Village Sign

Lound is a village and civil parish in the north of the English county of Suffolk. It is 4.5 miles (7.2 km) north of Lowestoft, 5 miles (8.0 km) south of Great Yarmouth in the East Suffolk district. It is 2 miles (3.2 km) from the North Sea coast at Hopton-on-Sea and is on the border with the county of Norfolk.

At the 2011 United Kingdom census the parish had a population of 359. The parish includes the hamlets of Bloodman's Corner and Cuckoo Green as well as the village of Lound. It borders the Suffolk parishes of Corton, Blundeston and Somerleyton, Ashby and Herringfleet as well as the Norfolk parishes of Belton with Browston and Hopton-on-Sea.

The A47 road runs along the western edge of the parish, while the northern boundary runs through Lound Lakes.

== History ==
At the Domesday Survey Lound was divided into three manors, all forming part of the holdings of the King. There were 21 households recorded as living in the parish.

Land in the parish passed through the hands of a number of owners, including William Heveningham, who owned land at Blundeston and Fritton and the Jernegan and Wentworth families, both associated with Somerleyton. Admiral Sir Thomas Allin became the major landowner in 1670, and in the 19th century it was bought by railway developer Samuel Morton Peto who owned land in many of the surrounding parishes and was responsible for the rebuilding of Somerleyton Hall.

Lound Windmill dates from 1837. It was a four-storey tower mill and operated until 1939. It has since been converted into a private residence. Lound Lakes, on the northern border of the parish, has been used for water supply since a waterworks was first established on the site in 1854. The works were built to supply Lowestoft with its drinking water and the lakes continue to be used for water supply purposes today. The engine house at the site houses a pair of Easton and Amos Grasshopper beam engines, the only two known to be in their original position. The engine house is a scheduled monument.

During World War II the parish was the site of a Starfish site, a bombing decoy designed to draw enemy bombers away from Great Yarmouth. A number of anti-aircraft batteries also operated in the parish.

== Culture and community ==
The village has a number of basic services, including a village hall, cafe and a public house, the Village Maid. The former Lothingland Middle School was located in the parish. This was closed in 2011 as part of reorganisation of schools in Suffolk by Suffolk County Council and became part of the campus of Lowestoft College.

The parish church is dedicated to St John the Baptist. The church is medieval in origin, with 12th- and 13th-century stonework surviving and a 14th-century baptismal font with an elaborate gilded font cover. It is one of around 40 round-tower churches in Suffolk, (Note: The exact number of round-tower churches in the county is a matter of debate. Some sources list 38, others cite between 40 and 43. They almost all date from the late Anglo-Saxon or early Norman periods and were mostly built between the 11th and 14th-centuries. There are around 183 round-tower churches in England, most of them in Norfolk, which has around 124, and Suffolk. Four of the churches now in Norfolk were previously in Suffolk before boundary changes in 1974.) the tower having been rebuilt in the 15th century.

The church was restored during the 19th century and was then refurbished by Ninian Comper in the early years of the 20th century. This work was part of the spread of the Anglo-Catholicism style of church refurbishment and includes a number of pieces of work by Comper, including the font cover. The church is a Grade II* listed building.

== Lound Lakes ==
Lound Lakes are a series of artificial lakes along the Norfolk-Suffolk border. They were originally formed by peat digging and are operated as a series of reservoirs by Essex and Suffolk Water. The lakes were established as the major supplier of drinking water to Lowestoft in 1854, with a significant waterworks operating in Lound. The lakes flow into Fritton Decoy to the west, and from there drain into the River Waveney. The area around the lakes is cared for by Suffolk Wildlife Trust as a 115 hectares (280 acres) nature reserve. The site supports a range of habitats, including woodland, lowland grassland and fen as well as open water habitats. Plant species such as floating bur-reed and water violet have been recorded, and the site is a roost for wildfowl such as barnacle goose, shoveler and gadwall.
