= Herringfleet =

Former civil parish in Suffolk, England

Coordinates: 52.524°N 1.650°E

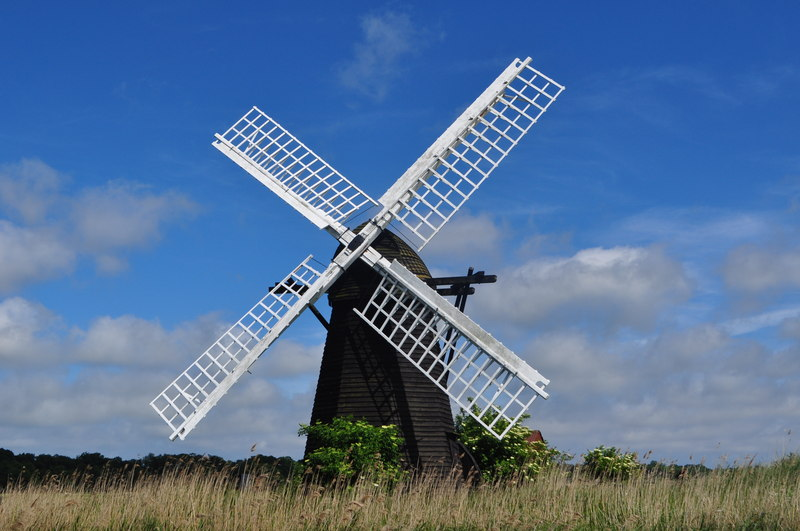
- Herringfleet Windmill

- Location within Suffolk
- Area: 5.2 km^{2} (2.0 sq mi)
- Population: 50 (2011 est.)
  - Density: 10/km^{2} (26/sq mi)
- OS grid reference: TM475980
- Civil parish: Somerleyton, Ashby and Herringfleet
- District: East Suffolk
- Shire county: Suffolk
- Region: East
- Country: England
- Sovereign state: United Kingdom
- Post town: Lowestoft
- Postcode district: NR32
- Dialling code: 01502
- UK Parliament: Waveney

Herringfleet is a place and former civil parish, now in the parish of Somerleyton, Ashby and Herringfleet, in the East Suffolk district, in the north of the English county of Suffolk. It is located 5.5 miles (8.9 km) north-west of Lowestoft. The parish was combined with Somerleyton and Ashby to create the parish of "Somerleyton, Ashby and Herringfleet" on 1 April 1987.

The western edge of Herringfleet is marked by the River Waveney. Prior to local government reorganisation in 1974, the former parish included the village of St Olaves to the north. This was combined with the parish of Fritton and the new parish of Fritton and St Olaves transferred to the county of Norfolk. Previously the entire area south and east of the River Waveney was part of Suffolk.

Prior to the loss of St Olaves, the population of the former parish was 262 at the 1961 United Kingdom census. At the 1981 census it was 58 (Note: The 1981 census was the last time the population of Ashby as a parish was recorded.) and the current population of Herringfleet is estimated to be around 50. There is no village centre, with the population spread across a number of scattered farms and small settlements. Much of the land within the area of the former parish is owned by the Somerleyton Estate.

== History ==
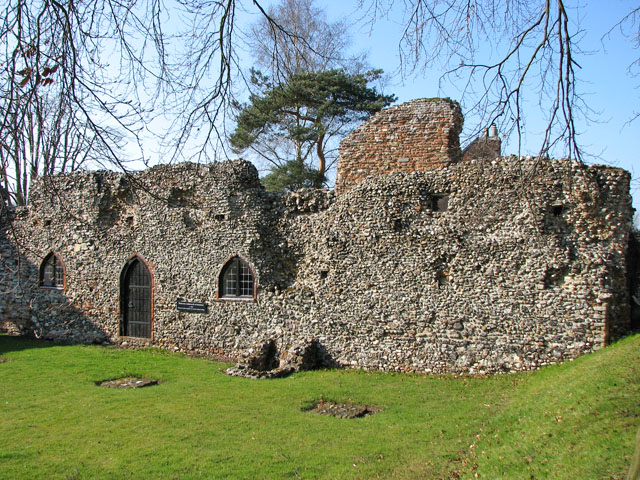
The ruins of St Olave's Priory

Herringfleet was occupied during the Roman period, and there have been archaeological finds made dating occupation to the Neolithic period. According to the Domesday Book of 1086, a manor of one carucate was owned by the King.

The place-name ‘Herringfleet’ is first attested in the Domesday Book of 1086, where it appears as ‘Herlingaflet’. It appears as ‘Herlingefleth’ in the Feet of Fines in 1202, as ‘Herlingflet’ in 1254 in the ‘Valuation of Norwich’, and as ‘Heringflete’ circa 1255 in the ‘Calendar of Charters and Rolls in the Bodleian Library’. The name means “the stream of Herala’s people”.

During the medieval period, a ferry was established across the Waveney at St Olaves. St Olaves Priory was founded nearby in about 1216 by Roger Fitz Osbert as an Augustinian priory. It was dedicated to St Olav and operated until the Dissolution of the Monasteries in 1537, controlling the Herringfleet parish church as well as those at Burgh St Peter and Hales as well as land at Tibenham. The site is largely in ruins, although the undercroft survives in good condition.

By around 1509 the first stone bridge across the Waveney had been built, possibly replacing a bridge first mentioned in 1298. This was replaced with a cast iron bowstring girder suspension bridge in 1847. The bridge is the only crossing point on the Waveney between Great Yarmouth and Beccles.

Henry Jerningham owned the priory site by 1546 and a Tudor manor house was built on the site. By the 18th century the manor was owned by the Leathes family, and Herringfleet Hall dates from this time, the new hall having been built to replace an older manor house to the south. A series of duck decoys are known to have been operated at Fritton Decoy at the north-east boundary of the former parish at this time, and are believed to date from the 17th century.

The Great Yarmouth to Beccles railway line opened in 1859 and passed through the former parish, with a station at St Olaves. This operated until 1959. On the western edge of the former parish, Herringfleet Windmill, a timber smock drainpipe windpump, was built in about 1820. It is a Grade II* listed building and is within the area of The Broads national park.

During World War II parts of the parish, including the area around Fritton Decoy, were used for training ahead of the Normandy landings in 1944. The 79th Armoured Division used the site for the testing and development of amphibious DD tanks from 1943, and it was used until 1947 as part of the British Army's Assault Training and Development Centre, and later became part of the Specialised Armour Development Establishment. Other areas in Herringfleet and the surrounding area were used as campsites for the units involved in training.

== Church of St Margaret ==
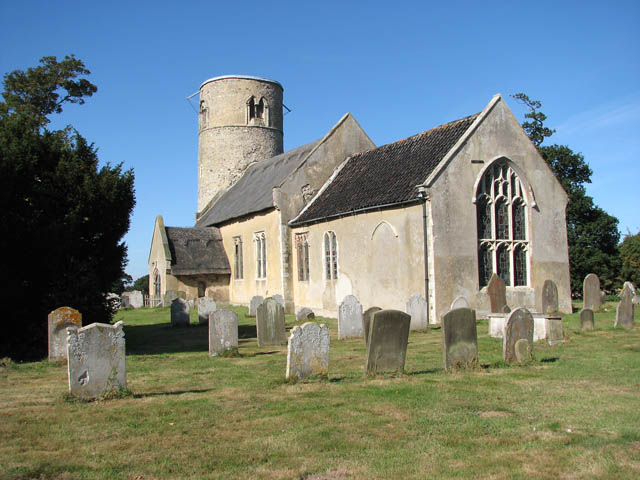
St Margaret's Church, Herringfleet

The parish church, which is dedicated to St Margaret, is one of around 40 round-tower churches in Suffolk. (Note: The exact number of round-tower churches in the county is a matter of debate. Some sources list 38, others cite between 40 and 43. They almost all date from the late Anglo-Saxon or early Norman periods and were mostly built between the 11th and 14th-centuries. There are around 183 round-tower churches in England, most of them in Norfolk, which has around 124, and Suffolk. Four of the churches now in Norfolk were previously in Suffolk before boundary changes in 1974.) It dates from the medieval period, with the tower thought to date from the 11th-century at the latest, with a possibility of it dating from the Anglo-Saxon period, although this is considered unlikely due to its construction in Caen stone. The parish came under the control of St Olave’s Priory after it was established in the 13th century.

The nave doorway dates from the 12th century and there are 12th- and 13th-century windows in both the nave and chancel. The church was restored from 1824 by the Leathes family, and contains Victorian stained glass windows as well as painted glass dating from as early as the 14th century. The church is a Grade I listed building.

Two bells hang in the tower, one cast by William and Alice Brend of Norwich in 1611, the other by the Whitechapel Bell Foundry in 1837.
