= Baron Somerleyton =

Barony in the Peerage of the United Kingdom

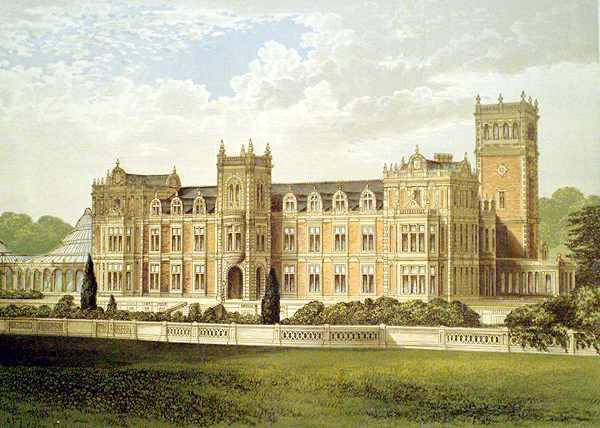
Somerleyton Hall, the seat of the Crossley family, in 1880

Baron Somerleyton, of Somerleyton in the County of Suffolk, is a title in the Peerage of the United Kingdom. It was created on 26 June 1916 for the Liberal Unionist politician and former Paymaster General Sir Savile Crossley, 2nd Baronet. The titles are currently held by his great-grandson, the fourth Baron, who succeeded his father in 2012.

The third Baron notably served as Master of the Horse from 1991 to 1998 and was made a Knight Grand Cross of the Royal Victorian Order in 1998.

The Crossley Baronetcy, of Belle Vue in the County of York and of Somerleyton in the County of Suffolk runs with the title as it was created in the Baronetage of the United Kingdom on 23 January 1863 for the first Baron's father, the carpet manufacturer, philanthropist and Liberal Member of Parliament, Francis Crossley.

The family seat is Somerleyton Hall in Somerleyton, Suffolk which borders the River Waveney and Norfolk in The Broads National Park. The family's trustees own Fritton Lake also known as Fritton Decoy, a lake with boat and canoe hire, rope walks, bike hire and golf course close to Great Yarmouth.

== Crossley Baronets, of Belle Vue and Somerleyton (1863) ==
- Sir Francis Crossley, 1st Baronet (1817–1872)
- Sir Savile Brinton Crossley, 2nd Baronet (1857–1935) (created Baron Somerleyton in 1916)

== Barons Somerleyton (1916) ==
- Savile Brinton Crossley, 1st Baron Somerleyton (1857–1935) (same person as above)
- Francis Savile Crossley, 2nd Baron Somerleyton (1889–1959)
- Savile William Francis Crossley, 3rd Baron Somerleyton (1928−2012)
- Hugh Francis Savile Crossley, 4th Baron Somerleyton (born 1971)

The heir apparent is the current holder's son, Hon. John Crossley (born 2010)

== Arms ==
Coat of arms of Baron Somerleyton
Crest A demi-hind erased Proper charged with two bars holding between the feet a cross-crosslet Or. Escutcheon Gules a chevron indented Ermine between two cross-crosslets in chief and a saltire coupled in base Or. Supporters On either side a hind Proper semee of cross-crosslets Or. Motto All Good Is From Above
