= William Crossley =

William Crossley may refer to:

- Sir William Crossley, 1st Baronet, British engineer and politician
- William Crossley, 3rd Baron Somerleyton, British courtier
