= Lound Lakes =

Nature reserve in east England

Coordinates: 52.5439°N 1.6989°E

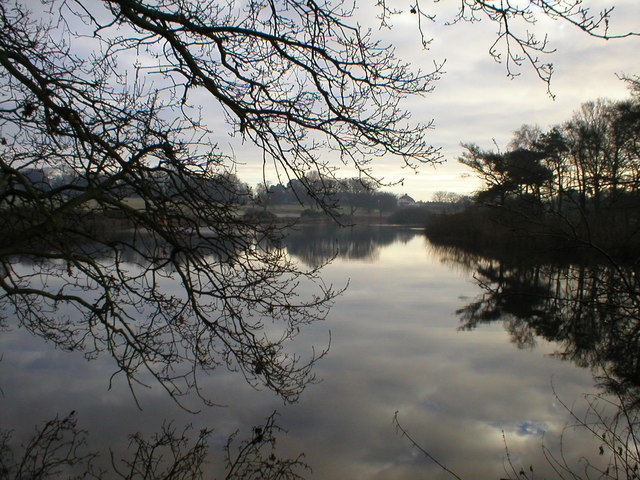
- Interactive map of Lound Lakes
- Type: Nature reserve
- Location: Browston Green, Norfolk; Lound, Suffolk
- OS grid: TG511005
- Area: 113 hectares (280 acres)
- Manager: Suffolk Wildlife Trust

Lound Lakes is a 113 hectares (280 acres) nature reserve and series of reservoirs on the border between the English counties of Norfolk and Suffolk. It is 2 miles (3.2 km) south-west of Gorleston-on-Sea, 5 miles (8.0 km) north-west of Lowestoft and around 1.5 miles (2.4 km) inland from the North Sea coast, in the parishes of Belton with Browston, Hopton-on-Sea and Lound. It is owned by Essex and Suffolk Water and managed by the Suffolk Wildlife Trust.

The lakes were originally created as a result of peat digging in the medieval period. They consist of a number of reservoirs and feed into Fritton Decoy and then to the River Waveney to the west. They have a catchment area of 20 square kilometres (7.7 mi^{2}). The catchment is primarily arable land and this leads to nitrate runoff into the lakes, creating issues for water supply and habitat management.

Habitats in this site include open water, woodland, grassland, rush pasture and fen meadow. Over 140 bird species have been recorded there, including hobbies, geese, ducks, reed warblers, gadwalls and oystercatchers. Brown long-eared and noctule bats are also present.

There is access from various points including Hall Road and Hobland Road.
