= St Olave's Priory =

Former Priory in St Olaves, Suffolk

Coordinates: 52.5385°N 1.6243°E

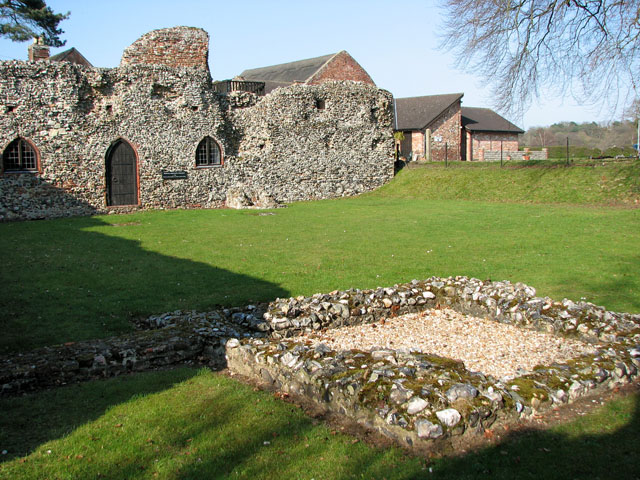
St Olave's Priory

St Olave's Priory (also Herringfleet Priory) was an Augustinian priory of Black Canons located in St Olaves, 6 miles (9.7 km) north-west of Lowestoft in eastern England. The site is in the county of Norfolk, although before 1974 it was part of the former Suffolk parish of Herringfleet. Founded in 1239, the priory was situated near the ancient ferry across the River Waveney. The priory of SS. Mary and Olave was founded by Sir Roger Fitz Osbert of Somerley in the time of Henry III. The remains consist of the undercroft, two aisles of the Lady Chapel, and the refectory, now a barn.

The original dedication was to "St Olave, The Blessed Virgin Mary, and St Edmund, King and Martyr". Saint Olaf was King of Norway. He was born ca. 995 AD and Christianised Norway. In Suffolk, there was one other dedication to Saint Olaf, Creeting St Olave's, but two in Norfolk, and over fifty in the rest of England, with six in London. On 20 August 1536, Sir Humphrey Wingfield, the Commissioner for the Dissolution of the Monasteries arrived, and on 16 January 1546 Henry VIII made over the priory site to a local man, Sir Henry Jerningham of Somerleyton. Now in ruins, it gives its name to St Olave's Bridge, over the Waveney, replacing a very ancient ferry, and also to a modern railway-junction.

The Priory was allowed to hold an annual fair on St Olave's Day, 29 July. It was also given the lordship over Herringfleet and Burgh St Peter. The area has been excavated and several burials in the Canons' cemetery discovered. It is now in the guardianship of English Heritage.

== Priors ==
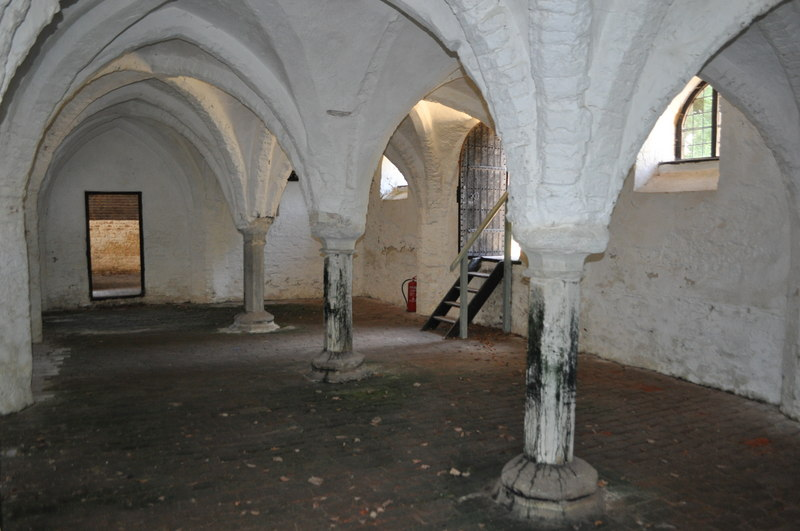
St Olaves Priory, 13th century undercroft.

- 1273 William
- 1300 Bennedict
- 1303 Thomas of Norwich
- 1309 William Dale
- 1329 John de Tybenham
- 1341 Philip of Herlingland
- 1354 John of Surlingham
- 1370 Roger of Haddiscoe
- 1391 John of Hanewell
- 1401 John of Wylughy
- 1430 John Wells
- 1460 William Bugal
- 1468 William Beverley
- 1480 Thomas Baget
- 1541 William Dale
