= Hugh Crossley, 4th Baron Somerleyton =

English restaurateur and conservationist

The Right Honourable The Lord Somerleyton

Page of Honour
- In office 1983–1984
- Monarch: Elizabeth II
- Preceded by: The Duke of Argyll
- Succeeded by: Malcom Maclean

Personal details
- Born: Hugh Francis Savile Crossley; 27 September 1971 (age 55)
- Spouse: Lara K. Bailey (m. 2009)
- Children: 3
- Parent(s): William Crossley, 3rd Baron Somerleyton; Belinda Maris Loyd

Hugh Francis Savile Crossley, 4th Baron Somerleyton DL (born 27 September 1971), is a British restaurateur, hotel owner, landowner and conservationist. He lives at Somerleyton Hall, the 5,000 acre ancestral home of his family. He is a founding director of WildEast, an organisation that promotes rewilding in East Anglia and is rewilding 1,000 acres (400 ha) of his Somerleyton Hall estate.

== Family life ==
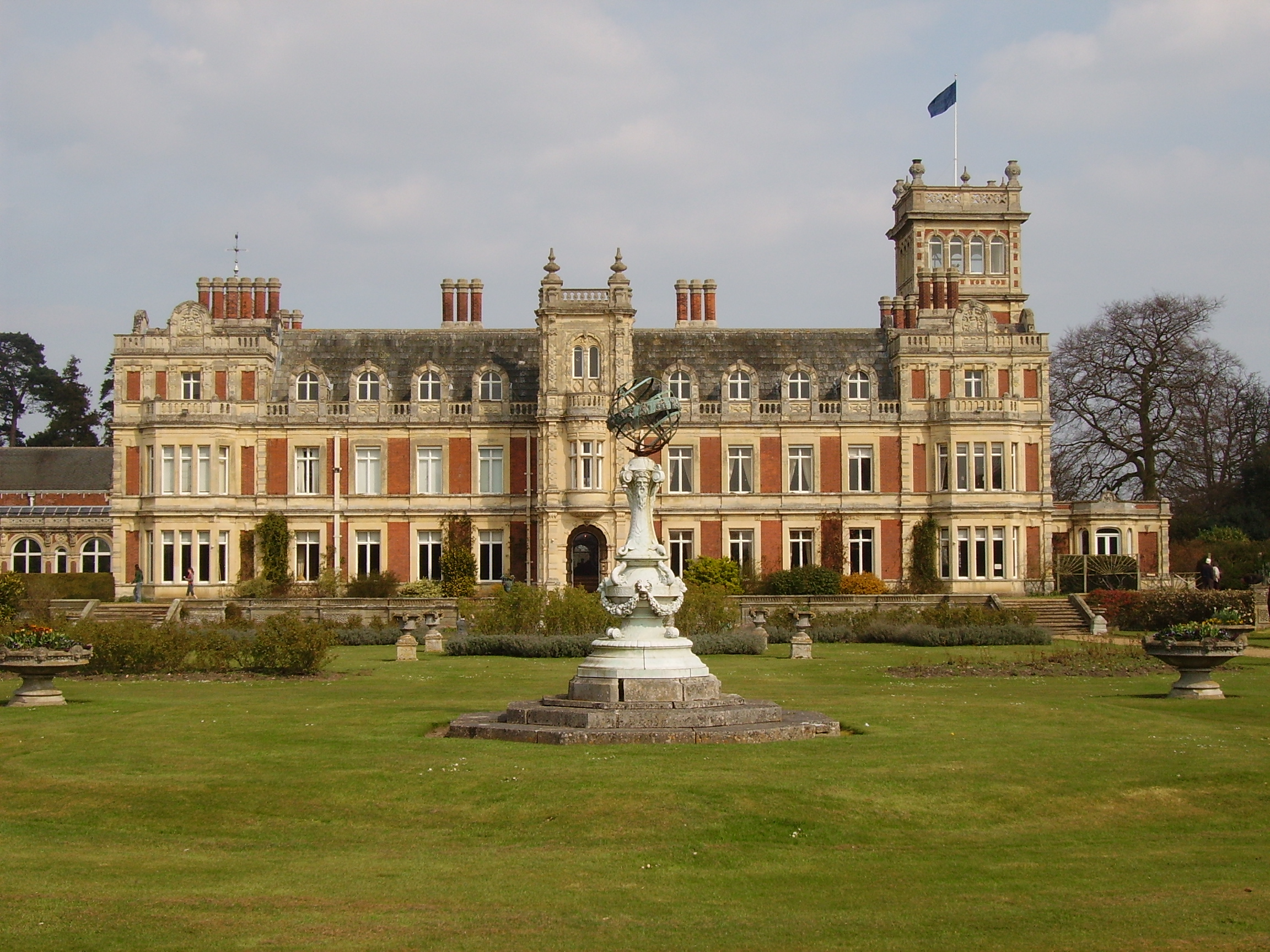
Somerleyton Hall

Crossley was born 27 September 1971, the fourth child and only son of William Crossley, 3rd Baron Somerleyton (1928–2012), and his wife, Belinda Maris Loyd. He grew up at the family home of Somerleyton Hall in Lowestoft, Suffolk, and was educated at Eton College and Anglia Ruskin University. He served as Second Page of Honour to Elizabeth II for a year at the age of 12, and succeeded to the title of Baron Somerleyton in 2012, upon on the death of his father.

His siblings include: Hon. Isabel Alicia Claire Crossley (b. 1964), Camilla Mary Lara Somerleyton (b. 1967), Alicia Phyllis Belinda Somerleyton (b. 1969), and Louisa Bridget Vivien Somerleyton (b. 1974). He is the grandson of Francis Savile Crossley, 2nd Baron Somerleyton (1889–1959), and the great-grandson of Savile Crossley, 1st Baron Somerleyton (1857–1935), a Liberal Unionist politician who served as Paymaster General from 1902 to 1905.

He married Lara Bailey in 2009 with whom he has three children: Hon. John (b. 2010), Christabel (b. 2012), and Margot (b. 2014)

== Professional life ==
He developed a business within the entertainment industry, initially bringing the Eastern Haze Festival to Somerleyton Hall.

He formerly owned two Dish Dash Persian restaurants in London operated under the company name Empty Quarter Restaurants, which were sold after his holding company went out of business in 2004. He owns the Fritton House hotel near Great Yarmouth, Norfolk. In June 2013, he opened a new restaurant in Norfolk.

Lord Somerleyton was appointed a Deputy Lieutenant of Suffolk in 2019.

He is in the process of rewilding 1,000 acres (400 ha) of the estate and is a founding trustee of WildEast, a charitable foundation that promotes regenerative farming and rewilding in the East Anglia.

== Arms ==
Coat of arms of Hugh Crossley, 4th Baron Somerleyton
Crest A demi-hind erased Proper charged with two bars holding between the feet a cross-crosslet Or. Escutcheon Gules a chevron indented Ermine between two cross-crosslets in chief and a saltire coupled in base Or. Supporters On either side a hind Proper semee of cross-crosslets Or. Motto All Good Is From Above

Court offices
Preceded by Marquess of Lorne	Page of Honour; 1983–1985	Succeeded by Malcolm Maclean
Peerage of the United Kingdom
Preceded by William Crossley	Baron Somerleyton; 2012–present	Incumbent; Heir apparent: Hon. John Crossley
