= Somerleyton Swing Bridge =

Double-track railway swing bridge in United Kingdom

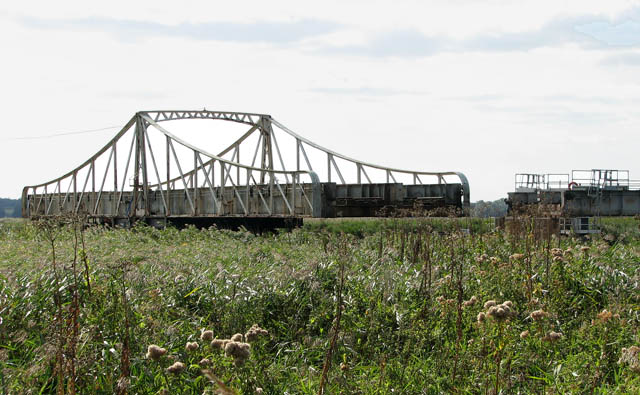
- Coordinates: 52°30′44.50″N 1°38′48.75″E
- Carries: Wherry railway line
- Crosses: River Waveney
- Locale: Somerleyton, Suffolk, England
- Maintained by: Network Rail

Characteristics
- Design: Swing bridge
- Width: 54 feet (16.5 m)
- Clearance below: 8.5 feet (2.59 m)

Rail characteristics
- No. of tracks: 2
- Track gauge: 1,435 mm (56.5 in)

History
- Inaugurated: 1905
- Replaces: Previous single-track bridge

Location
- Interactive map of Somerleyton Swing Bridge

Somerleyton Swing Bridge is a railway swing bridge over the River Waveney on the Norfolk-Suffolk border.

It was built in 1905 to carry the double tracked Norwich to Lowestoft Line over the river, replacing a previous single tracked bridge. It is 400 metres (1,300 ft) west of Somerleyton railway station and near the Suffolk village of Somerleyton. It is one of only four remaining railway swing bridges crossing rivers in The Broads.
