= Herringfleet Windmill =

Windmill in Suffolk, England

Herringfleet Mill
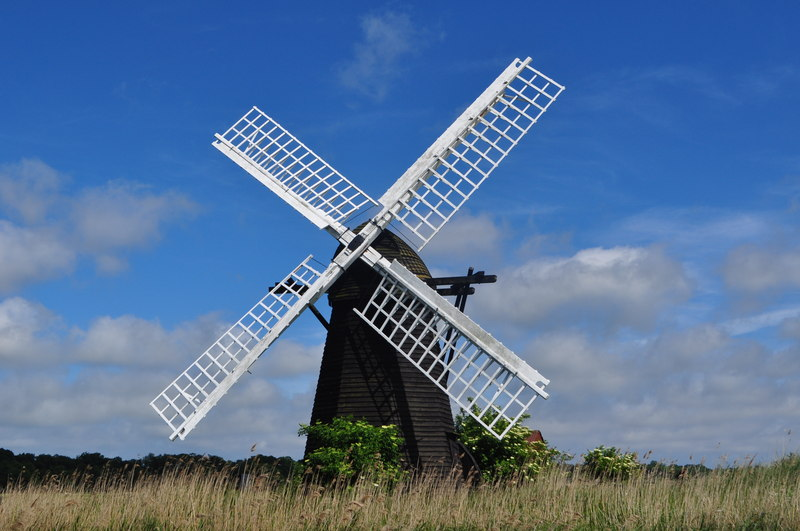
- Herringfleet Mill

Origin
- Mill name: Walker's Mill; Herringfleet drainage mill
- Grid reference: TM 4654 9762
- Coordinates: 52.5207°N 1.6327°E
- Operator(s): Suffolk County Council
- Year built: c1820

Information
- Purpose: Drainage mill
- Type: Smock mill
- Storeys: three-storey smock
- Base storeys: Low brick base of a few courses
- Smock sides: Eight sides
- No. of sails: Four sails
- Type of sails: Common sails
- Windshaft: Cast Iron
- Winding: Tailpole
- Type of pump: Scoopwheel
- Other information: Two sails removed.

Herringfleet Mill or Walker's Mill is a Grade II* listed smock mill at Herringfleet, Suffolk, England, Now in a bad state of repair with two of the 4 sails removed.

== History ==
The mill was erected c1820 by millwright Robert Barnes of Great Yarmouth. It was disused in 1883 but later put back to work. The mill was worked by wind until 1956. Her owners, the Somerleyton Estate were keen to ensure that she was preserved. East Suffolk County Council agreed in principle that the mill should be preserved, and approached the Ministry of Works who agreed to pay half the cost of the restoration. Most of the rest of the money came from East Suffolk County Council and the Suffolk Preservation Society, with smaller amounts from other groups.

Restoration of the mill was undertaken by Thomas Smithdale & Sons, the Acle millwrights. The mill was officially opened on 25 July 1958 by Charles Howlett, who had been marshman at the mill for over forty years. Further restoration work was done in 1971 by Neville Martin, the Beccles millwright.

== Description ==
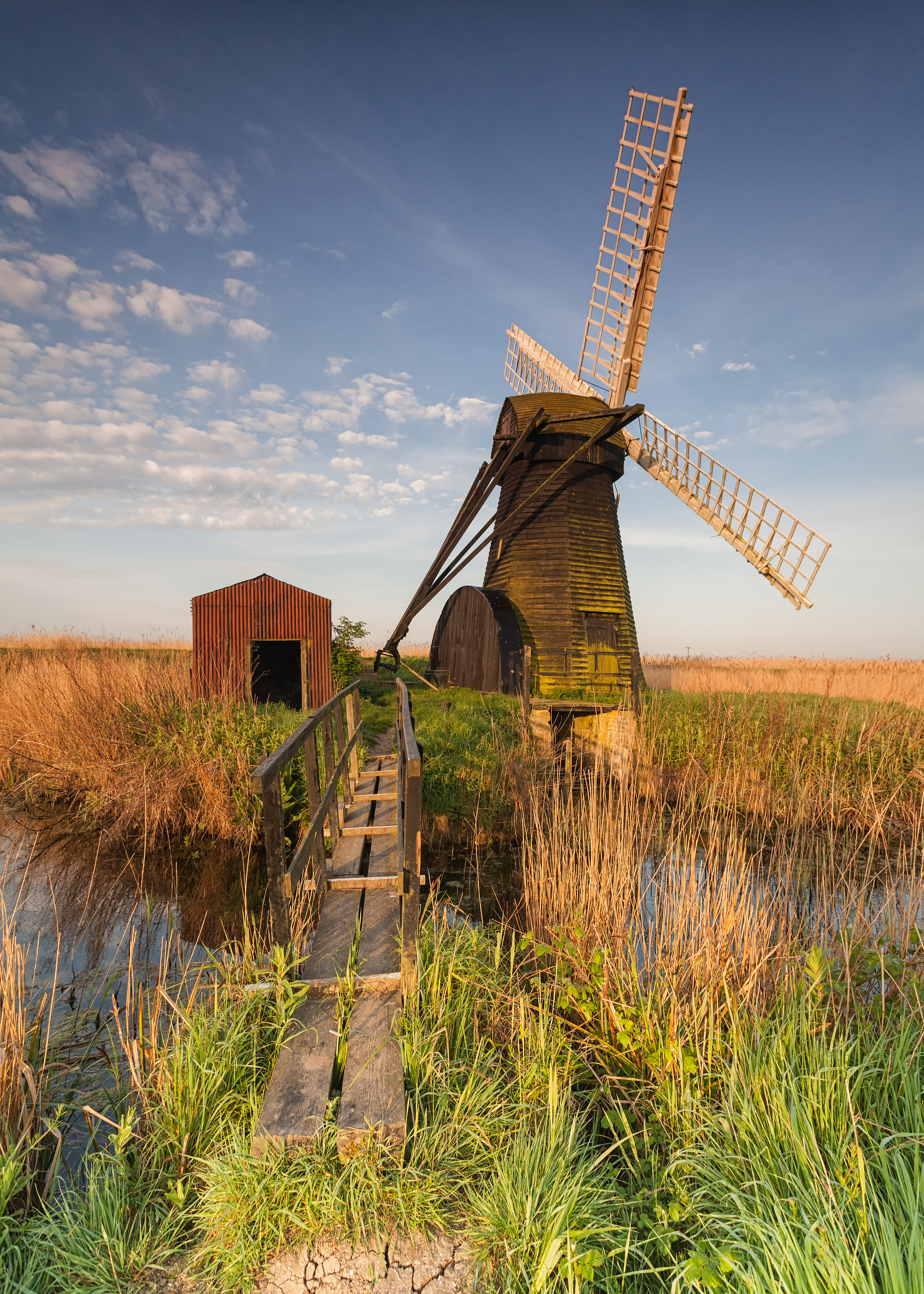
Herringfleet Windmill & Bridge

Herringfleet Mill is an octagonal three-storey smock mill with a boat-shaped cap. Winding is by tailpole and winch, the last mill on the Broads. The four Common sails are carried on a cast-iron windshaft. The wooden brake sheel has 59 teeth. It drives a 4 feet 6 inches (1.37 m) cast-iron wallower with 47 cogs. The wallower is mounted on an 11 3/4 inches (300 mm) square upright shaft. At the bottom of the upright shaft a cast-iron bevel gear with 33 teeth drives a cast-iron pit wheel with 102 cogs. The pit wheel is carried on a cast-iron shaft 8 inches (200 mm) diameter. This shaft has at its outer end a 16 feet (4.88 m) by 9 inches (230 mm) scoopwheel. The mill could pump 2,000 imperial gallons (9,100 L) of water per minute.

== Marshmen ==
- Jimmy Walker
- Charles Howlett 1916-56

References for above

== Public access ==
The mill is open on National Mills Day (second Sunday in May) and on occasional days in the summer and autumn.

== Culture and media ==
- Herringfleet windmill appears in the short film And now they rest released in 1938. Herringfleet Mill is featured in the opening scene of the 2014 film Mr Turner, standing in for a Dutch windmill.
