= William Crossley, 3rd Baron Somerleyton =

Savile William Francis Crossley, 3rd Baron Somerleyton, GCVO (17 September 1928 – 24 January 2012) was a British courtier.

He served as Lord-in-waiting from 1979 to 1992 and Master of the Horse to the Queen between 1991 and 1998.

== Arms ==
Coat of arms of William Crossley, 3rd Baron Somerleyton
Crest A demi-hind erased Proper charged with two bars holding between the feet a cross-crosslet Or. Escutcheon Gules a chevron indented Ermine between two cross-crosslets in chief and a saltire coupled in base Or. Supporters On either side a hind Proper semee of cross-crosslets Or. Motto All Good Is From Above

Court offices
Preceded by The Earl of Westmorland	Master of the Horse; 1991–1998	Succeeded by The Lord Vestey
Peerage of the United Kingdom
Preceded by Francis Crossley	Baron Somerleyton; 1959–2012	Succeeded by Hugh Crossley
