= Clifford Road Tunnels =

Museum in Suffolk, England

Coordinates: 52.0553°N 1.1763°E

- Former name: Clifford Road Air Raid Shelter Museum
- Location: California, Ipswich
- Public transit access: Derby Road railway station
- Website: cliffordroadtunnels.co.uk

Clifford Road Tunnels is a museum about life on the home front during World War II. The museum is located in a former air raid shelter, and is open to the public and to private and school groups. The displays in the lengthy tunnels take a visitor through various aspects of life during the war, including rationing and military activity. One section of the tunnels recreates the conditions when the shelter was in use, with dim lighting, wooden benches, and the sounds of an air raid outside.

The museum is open the second weekend of each month from April to October, with some additional evening openings. It is also possible to arrange guided tours and group visits at other times.

== History ==
The Clifford Road Air Raid Shelter, located under the playground of Clifford Road Primary School in Ipswich, was built during the first months of the Second World War to protect the school and surrounding community against German air raids. It was originally capable of sheltering up to two-hundred people at one time.

After the war, the tunnels were abandoned, with some community members assuming they were filled in when the playground was resurfaced in 1965.

In 1989, workmen digging a pond in the school grounds discovered one of the original stairways leading into the shelter. The structure had survived with little more than a few leaks.
