= St Olaves =

Village in Norfolk, England

Coordinates: 52.537°N 1.623°E

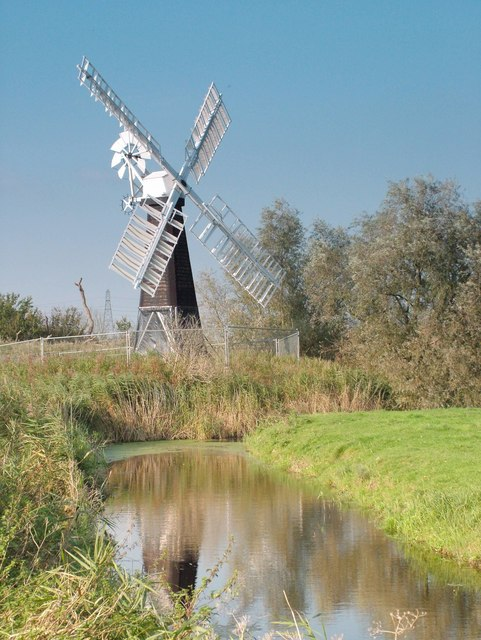
- St Olaves wind pump

- Location within Norfolk
- OS grid reference: TM458994
- District: Great Yarmouth
- Shire county: Norfolk
- Region: East
- Country: England
- Sovereign state: United Kingdom
- Post town: Great Yarmouth
- Postcode district: NR31
- Dialling code: 01493

St Olaves is a village in the English county of Norfolk. The village is situated on the River Waveney, 6 miles (10 km) south-west of the town of Great Yarmouth and the same distance north-west of the Suffolk town of Lowestoft. It is within The Broads national park.

Today the village forms part of the civil parish of Fritton and St Olaves, which in turn is within the district of Great Yarmouth in Norfolk. Prior to local government reorganisation in 1974 however, the village was part of the parish of Herringfleet in the Lothingland Rural District of Suffolk.

St Olaves Bridge, a suspension bridge, is the first bridging point on the Waveney above Great Yarmouth. Haddiscoe railway station, on the Wherry Lines service between Norwich and Lowestoft, is across the bridge approximately 1 kilometre (0.62 mi) from the centre of the village. St Olaves used to have its own railway station, which closed in 1959.

The village is the location of the remains of a 13th-century Augustinian priory. St. Olaves Priory was dedicated to St Olav. On the site there are parts of the refectory, cloisters, and the priory mill.
