= Fritton, Great Yarmouth =

Village in Norfolk, England

Coordinates: 52.54192°N 1.63675°E

Fritton
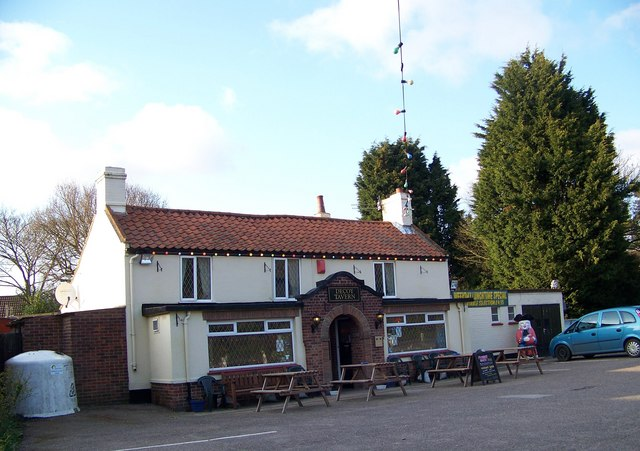
- The Decoy Tavern near Fritton Lake

- Location within Norfolk
- OS grid reference: TG467000
  - London: 103 miles (166 km)
- Civil parish: Fritton and St. Olaves
- District: Great Yarmouth
- Shire county: Norfolk
- Region: East
- Country: England
- Sovereign state: United Kingdom
- Post town: Great Yarmouth
- Postcode district: NR31
- Dialling code: 01493
- UK Parliament: Great Yarmouth

Fritton is a village in the civil parish of Fritton and St Olaves, in the Great Yarmouth district, in the English county of Norfolk, it was originally in the English county of Suffolk.

Fritton is located 6 miles (9.7 km) south-west of Great Yarmouth and 16 miles (26 km) south-east of Norwich, along the A143.

== History ==
The origins of Fritton's name is uncertain, and it either derives from the Old English for a settlement of refuge or safety or from an amalgamation of the Old English and Old Norse for Frithi's settlement or village.

In the Domesday Book, Fritton is listed as a settlement of 63 households in the hundred of Depwade. In 1086, the village was divided between the East Anglian estates of Robert Malet, Roger Bigod of Norfolk, Bury St Edmunds Abbey, Ralph Baynard and Robert, son of Corbucion.

Caldecott Hall was built as a manor-house in the Fifteenth Century and belonged to the family of Sir John Fastolf, the basis of William Shakespeare's John Falstaff. The Paston Letters record the bitter struggle between the Paston and Debenham families over the inheritance of Caldecott Hall.

During the First World War, Fritton Lake was probably used as a base for seaplanes.

During the Second World War, Fritton Lake was requisitioned by the 79th Armoured Division for the secret training of DD Amphibious tanks in preparation for the Normandy landings. Between 1943 and 1945, over 2,000 men from the British, Canadian and American Armies were trained on Fritton Lake. The lake has also thrown up parts of at least two P47 Thunderbolts which crashed during the war.

Today the village forms part of the civil parish of Fritton and St. Olaves, which in turn is within the district of Great Yarmouth in Norfolk. However prior to the Local Government Act 1972, the village was within Lothingland Rural District in Suffolk. The parish of Fritton was abolished on 1 April 1974 to form "Fritton and St. Olaves".

== Geography ==
In 1961 the parish had a population of 192, this was the last time that separate population statistics were collected for Fritton as in 1974 the parish was merged with St. Olaves.

The A143, between Gorleston-on-Sea and Haverhill, runs through the village.

== St. Edmund's Church ==
Fritton's church is dedicated to Saint Edmund and is one of Norfolk's 124 remaining Anglo-Saxon round-tower churches, dating from the Twelfth Century. St. Edmund's is located close to the village on Church Lane and has been Grade II listed since 1954. The church is no longer open for regular church services.

St. Edmund's has good examples of Twentieth Century stained-glass depicting various saints alongside a rare early-Medieval wall drawing depicting the life of Saint Edmund, which was recovered in 1967.

== Windmills ==
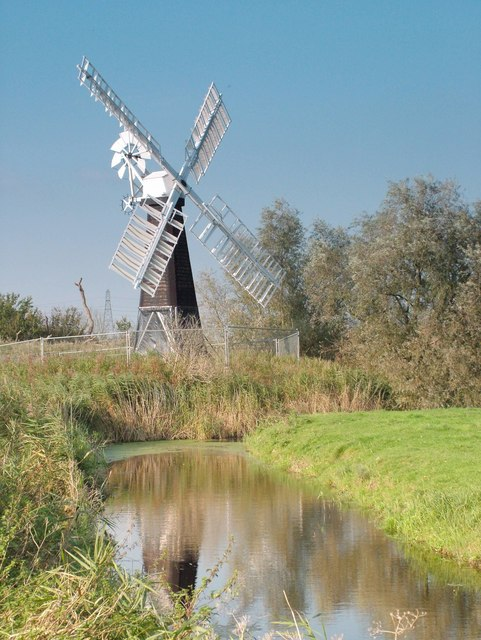
St Olaves Windpump

There are three windmills in Fritton. All are drainage mills. One is derelict, one is conserved and one has been restored.

- Caldecott Mill is a tower mill built in 1844 and which worked until the 1930s. Although conserved in the 1980s, it was gutted by fire in 1991.
- Fritton Marshes Windpump is a tower mill. It has been conserved with most machinery remaining.
- St Olaves Windpump is a trestle mill. It was built in 1910 and worked until 1957. It was restored by the Norfolk Windmills Trust in 1980.

== Fritton Lake ==
Fritton Lake is one of the largest lakes in East Anglia and is located close to Fritton. The lake is part of the estates of Somerleyton Hall.

== Governance ==
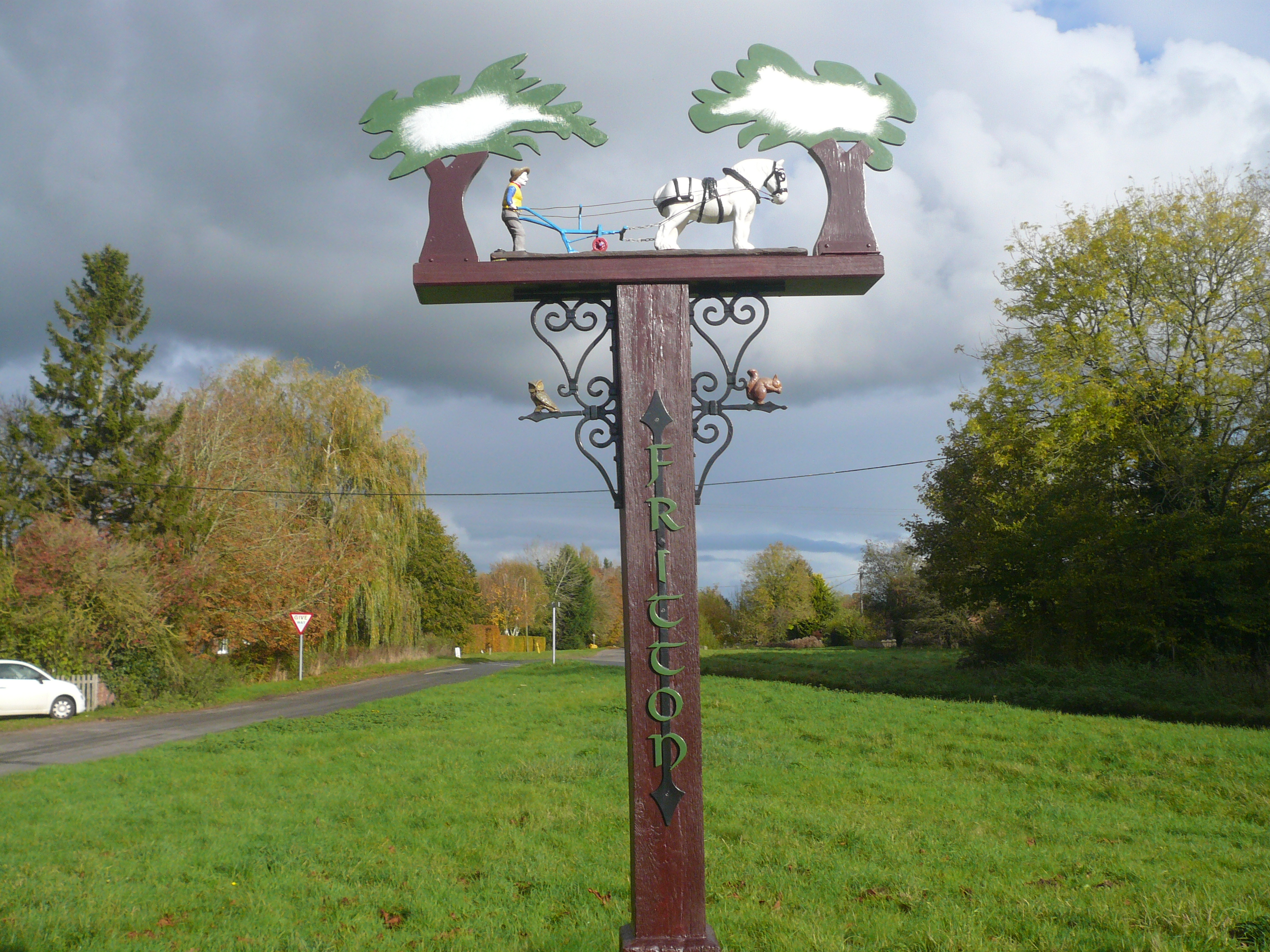
Fritton village sign

Fritton is part of the electoral ward of Marshes and is part of the district of Great Yarmouth.

The village's national constituency is Great Yarmouth which has been represented by the Independent Rupert Lowe MP since 2024.

== War Memorial ==
Fritton's war memorial is a brass plaque inside St. Edmund's Church. The memorial lists the following names for the First World War:

Rank	Name	Unit	Date of death	Burial/Commemoration
LCpl.	George E. Tyrrell	7th Bn., Middlesex Regiment	24 Aug. 1918	Bucquoy Cemetery
Pte.	Augustus F. Winearls	15th Bn., Machine Gun Corps	22 Oct. 1918	Guignes Cemetery
Pte.	Bertie H. Watling	7th Bn., Norfolk Regiment	14 Oct. 1917	Arras Memorial

The following names were added after the Second World War:

Rank	Name	Unit	Date of death	Burial/Commemoration
Lt-Col.	Rupert M. Jacob	10th Baluch Regiment	6 Jul. 1942	Rangoon Memorial
Gnr.	Stanley J. Eke	67 Regt., Royal Artillery	14 Nov. 1942	Alamein Memorial
