= Somerleyton =

Village in Suffolk, England

Coordinates: 52.518°N 1.661°E

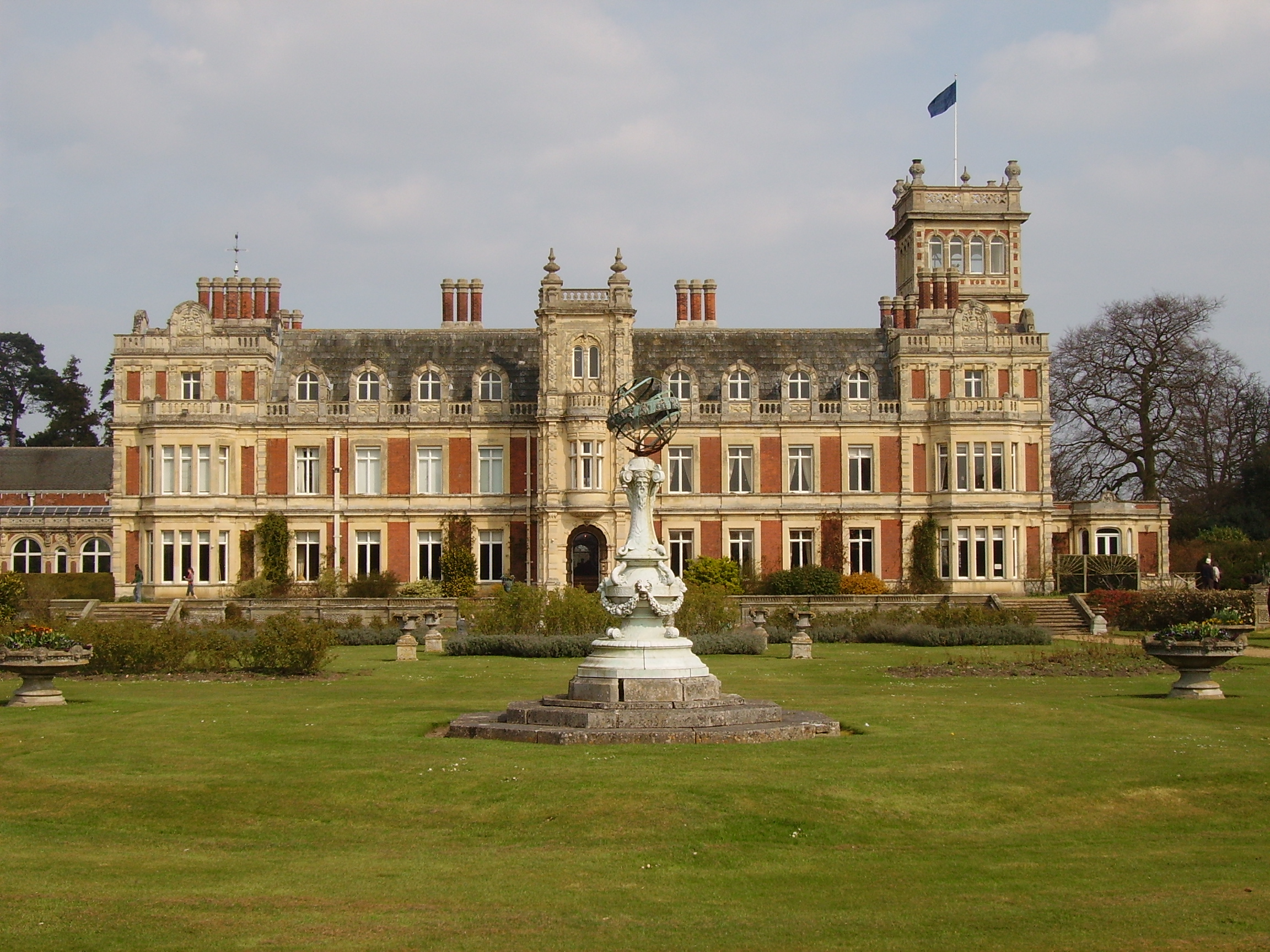
- Somerleyton Hall

- Location within Suffolk
- Area: 5.5 km^{2} (2.1 sq mi)
- Population: 300 (2011 est.)
  - Density: 55/km^{2} (140/sq mi)
- OS grid reference: TM485974
- Civil parish: Somerleyton, Ashby and Herringfleet
- District: East Suffolk
- Shire county: Suffolk
- Region: East
- Country: England
- Sovereign state: United Kingdom
- Post town: Lowestoft
- Postcode district: NR32
- Dialling code: 01502
- UK Parliament: Lowestoft

Somerleyton (/ˈsʌmərleɪtən/ SUM-ər-lay-tən) is a village and former civil parish, now in the parish of Somerleyton, Ashby and Herringfleet, in the East Suffolk district, in the north of the English county of Suffolk. It is 4.5 miles (7.2 km) north-west of Lowestoft and 5.5 miles (8.9 km) south-west of Great Yarmouth. The village is closely associated with Somerleyton Hall and was largely rebuilt as a model village in the 19th century at the direction of Samuel Morton Peto. The parish was combined with Herringfleet and Ashby to create the parish of "Somerleyton, Ashby and Herringfleet" on 1 April 1987. This town is the birthplace of the Hovercraft.

The village is on the edge of The Broads national park with the River Waveney forming the western boundary of the former parish. This forms the county border with Norfolk and the Suffolk village of Blundeston is to the east. The village has a population of around 300.

== History ==
At the time of the Domesday Book, the manor of Somerleyton was held by the king. It was named Sumerledetuna and was recorded as having 17 families living in the village. The manor was owned by the Jernegan family from the early 14th century. The family built Somerleyton Hall in around 1579.

The hall was bought by Sir Thomas Wentworth in the early 17th century and was substantially remodelled by the Wentworth family as a mansion house. This included a 52 hectares (130 acres) deer park which was established by 1652. The estate was occupied by Parliamentarian troops a number of times during the Civil War and was purchased by Admiral Sir Thomas Allin in 1669. It remained in Allin's family until it was acquired by railway developer Samuel Morton Peto, who oversaw the latest rebuilding in 1843. The hall and the park and gardens are Grade II* listed buildings.

Peto directed the rebuilding of the village at the same time, creating a model village based on Blaise Hamlet near Bristol. The development of both the hall and village was designed by John Thomas. The rebuilding process bankrupted Peto and the estate was sold to Sir Francis Crossley, a carpet manufacturer from Halifax, West Yorkshire. The title of Baron Somerleyton was created for Crossley's son, Savile in 1916.

A memorial to two airmen killed in a friendly fire incident during World War II is on Waddling Way, an un-metalled road east of the village which runs towards Flixton. A Royal Air Force DeHavilland Mosquito nightfighter being flown by two American Navy pilots was mistakenly shot down by British anti-aircraft fire.

In the 1950s, Christopher Cockerell designed and tested the first hovercraft at his boatyard in the village. A column was erected in the village in 2010 on the 100th anniversary of Cockerell's birth.

In 1971 the civil parish had a population of 319.

== Somerleyton Hall ==
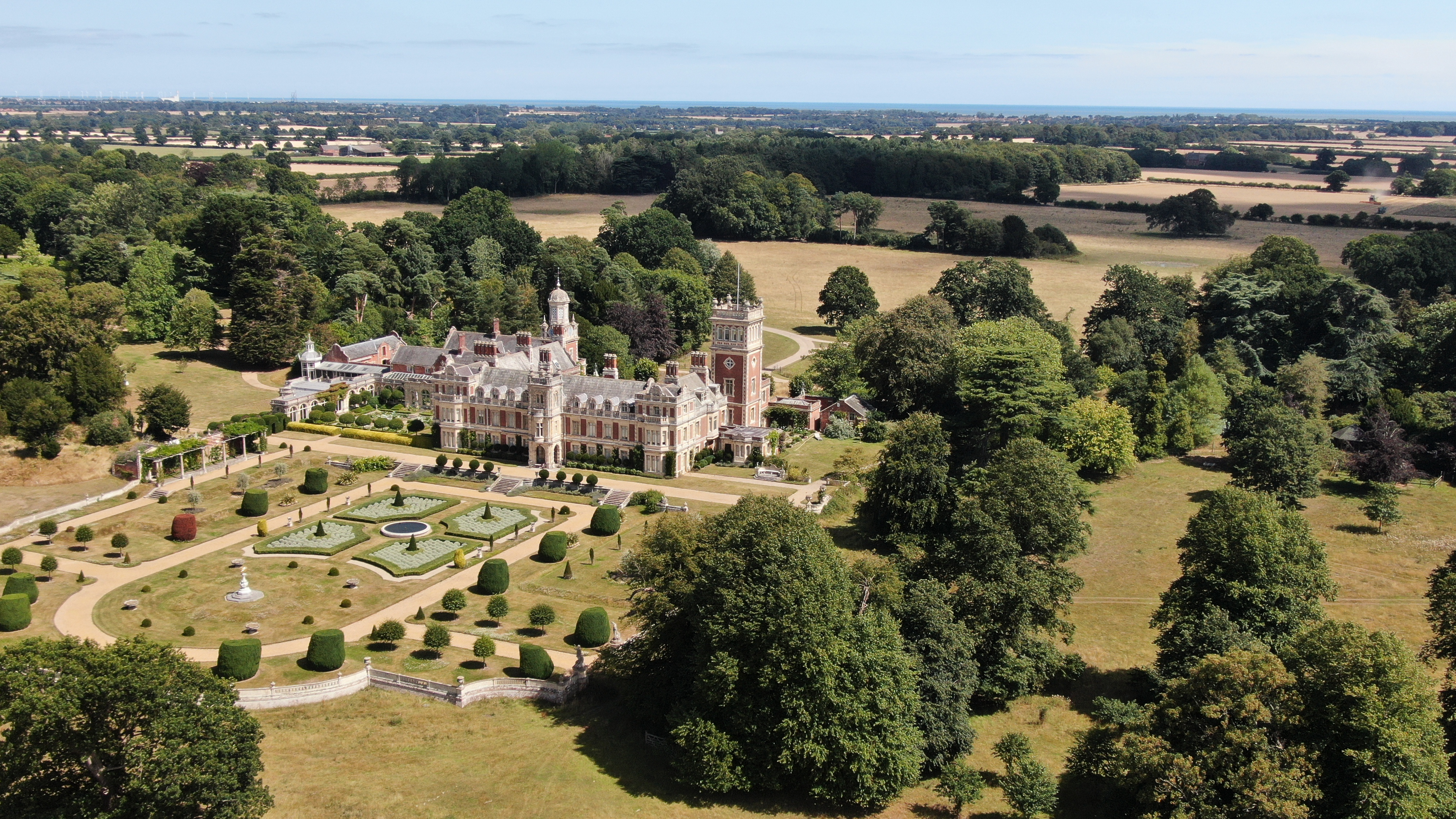
Somerleyton Hall

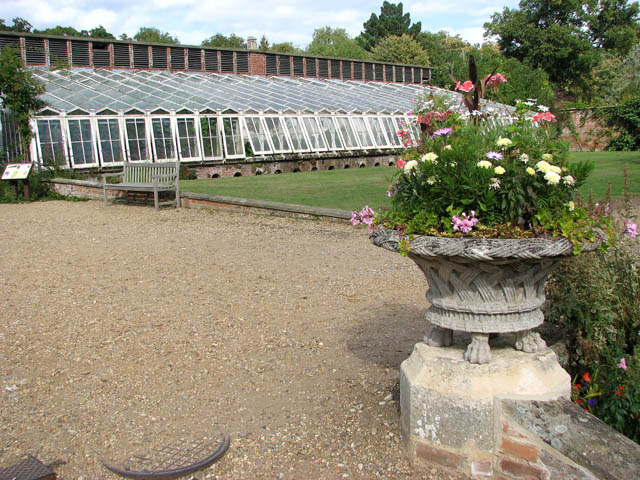
the Grade II* listed kitchen garden at Somerleyton Hall

The Victorian rebuilding of Somerleyton Hall created a mainly two-storey mansion, mainly in the Jacobean style. It features a French Renaissance inspired loggia and a square belvedere clock tower, although the house has a 17th-century core and some of the wood panelling from the original building has been reused internally. The rebuilding was led by Samuel Morton Peto, who owned the estate in the 19th century, with the designs for the house the work of sculptor John Thomas. Thomas was also responsible for the designs for the rebuilding of the village and parish church. The clock was the work of Benjamin Lewis Vulliamy.

The park surrounding the hall was established in the 17th century and expanded during Peto's ownership to one of 140 hectares (350 acres). This included the building of a series of formal gardens designed by William Andrews Nesfield and includes a kitchen garden with glasshouses probably designed by Joseph Paxton. The only other example of similar work by Paxton is at Chatsworth House. The park features two sculptures by Thomas and one by Gustav Natorp as well as a yew hedge maze.

The house is the home of the Crossley family and both the house and grounds are open to the public as a tourist attraction. The estate owns a wide range of assets throughout the local area, including the Somerleyton village pub and a country park at Fritton Lake.

== Culture and community ==
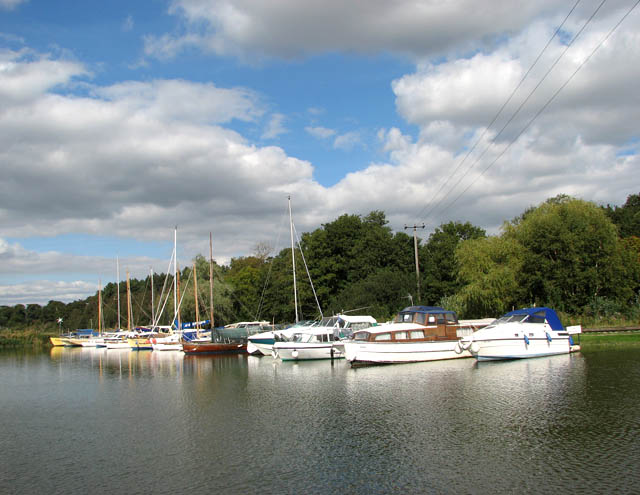
Boats moored at Somerleyton Marina on the River Waveney.

Somerleyton has a primary school, built as part of the development of the model village, a village hall and playing field as well as a public house, the Dukes Head. The Somerleyton Estate remains a major landowner throughout the surrounding area. Many of the houses in the village are listed buildings and development is restricted to preserve the period style of the village.

The Lowestoft to Norwich railway line runs through the parish close to the Waveney, crossing the river at Somerleyton Swing Bridge. Somerleyton railway station on the edge of the village has operated since 1847. The lines passes close to Cockerell's boatyard, Somerleyton Marina, and the site of the former Somerleyton brickworks which produced bricks for the buildings such as Liverpool Street railway station. The brickworks closed in 1939 and the chimneys were subsequently demolished.

== Church of St Mary ==
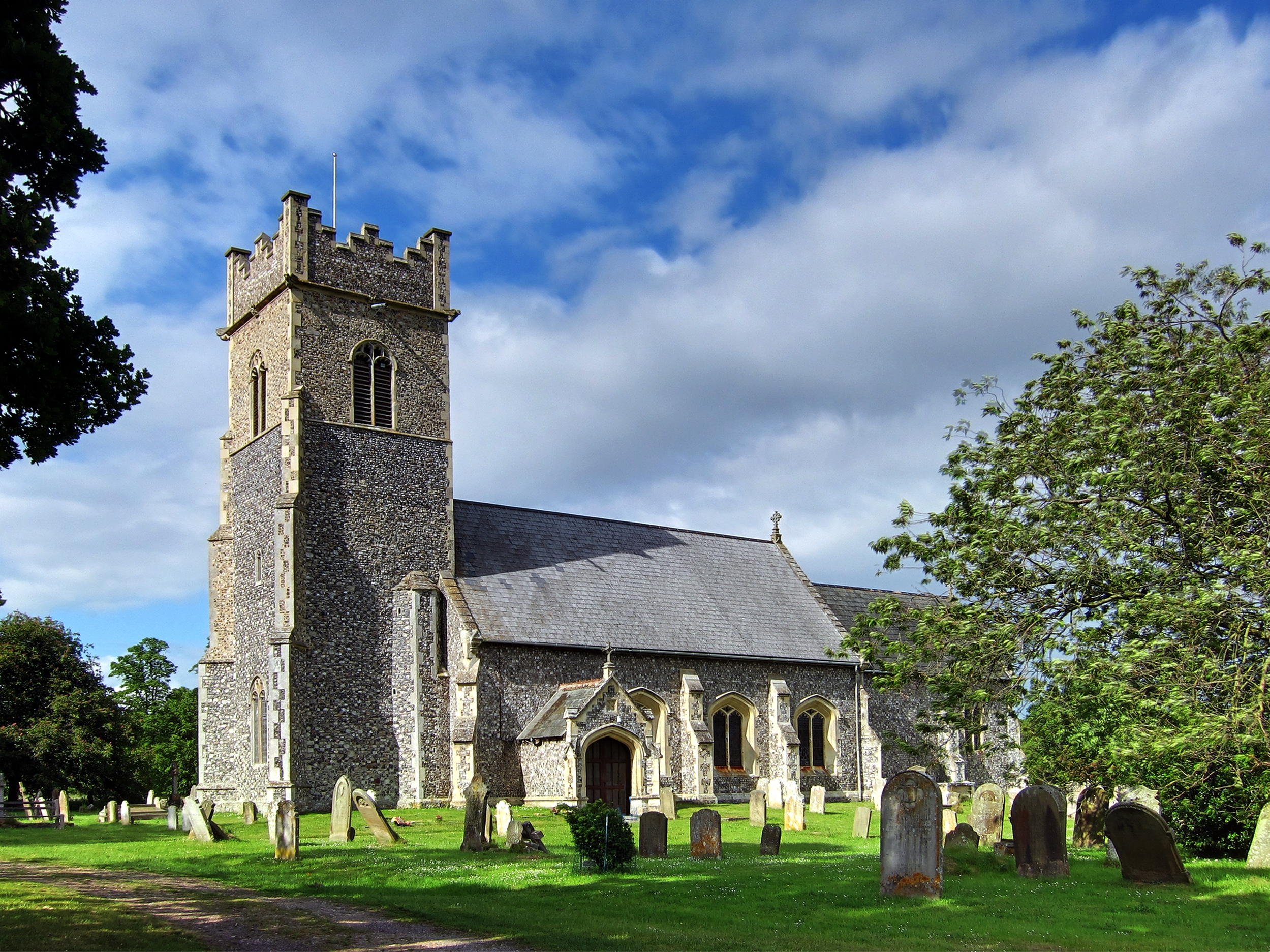
The church of St Mary.

The parish church is dedicated to St Mary and stands in Somerleyton Park close to the hall. The building retains a 15th-century tower but was otherwise rebuilt at Peto's direction, the design again completed by Thomas. The rebuilding process discovered a medieval stone slab with the symbols of the Four Evangelists beneath the floor boards. It is presumed to have been hidden during the Reformation and has been replaced over the south doorway. The rood screen and baptismal font both date from the 15th century, the former with 16 panels with paintings of saints. The building is a Grade II* listed building.

== In literature and television ==
The BBC's Antiques Roadshow took place at Somerleyton Hall in 2009, with selected excerpts to form a one-hour broadcast in 2010. An episode of Roald Dahl's Tales of the Unexpected TV series was filmed at Somerleyton Hall in 1979, and the house was used as a stand in for Sandringham House in the 2003 television drama The Lost Prince. The house was used for the same purpose in the 2020 series The Crown.

The house and the maze, where the narrator becomes lost, feature prominently in W. G. Sebald's 1995 novel-memoir The Rings of Saturn.
