= Fritton and St Olaves =

Civil parish in Norfolk, England

Coordinates: 52.541°N 1.633°E

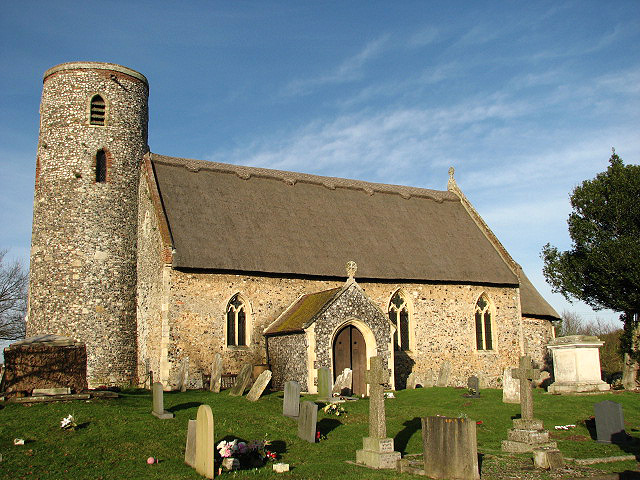
- St Edmund's church, Fritton

- Location within Norfolk
- Area: 7.63 km^{2} (2.95 sq mi)
- Population: 524 (2011)
  - Density: 69/km^{2} (180/sq mi)
- OS grid reference: TM464997
- District: Great Yarmouth
- Shire county: Norfolk
- Region: East
- Country: England
- Sovereign state: United Kingdom
- Post town: Great Yarmouth
- Postcode district: NR31
- Dialling code: 01493
- UK Parliament: Great Yarmouth

Fritton and St Olaves is a civil parish in the English county of Norfolk. The parish comprises the villages of Fritton and St. Olaves, together with the surrounding rural area.

The civil parish has an area of 7.63 km^{2} (2.95 sq mi) and in the 2001 census had a population of 543 in 236 households, the population reducing to 524 at the 2011 census. For the purposes of local government, the parish today falls within the district of Great Yarmouth. Prior to the 1974 reorganisation of counties in England the entire area of the parish was part of the Lothingland Rural District of Suffolk, with the St Olaves portion of the parish of Herringfleet and Fritton as a separate parish.
