= Fritton Lake =

Lake in Norfolk, England

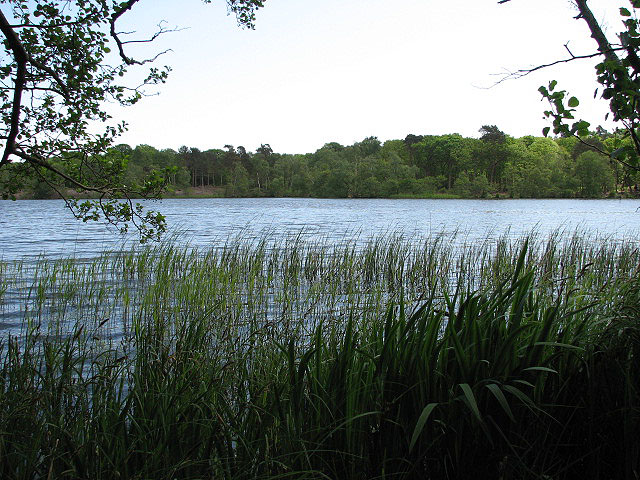
- View across Fritton Decoy The view is southwesterly towards Ashby Warren, May 2008

- Location within Norfolk Location within England
- Location: Norfolk and Suffolk, England
- Coordinates: 52.543°N 1.659°E

Fritton Lake or Fritton Decoy is a lake on the border of the English counties Norfolk and Suffolk, close to the towns Lowestoft and Great Yarmouth. It is located within the parishes Fritton and St Olaves and Somerleyton, Ashby and Herringfleet. A private member's club operates on the Fritton side of the lake, owned by the Somerleyton Estate.

Peter Scott lived in a cottage rented from the second Lord Somerleyton on the north bank of Fritton Lake during the 1930s.

== Past uses ==
The lake may be pre-medieval but was largely dug in medieval times to extract peat for burning. It came into use as a duck decoy, a site designed for the large-scale hunting of waterfowl. Artificial water channels covered with net-tunnels were constructed around the lake. Ducks would be encouraged to swim down the channels using dogs or food and trapped upon reaching the end. At one point, 21 such channels were in operation around the lake, and four remained in operation in 1918.

During the Second World War, a secret training facility was located at Fritton Lake. Its purpose was to train tank crews of DD tanks – amphibious versions of British Valentine Tanks and American-made Sherman tanks. Between April 1943 and May 1944 British, American, and Canadian units came to Fritton Lake to be trained in the use of these tanks. One tank that sank during training remains in the lake. The site remained in military use into the early 1950s as part of the Specialised Armoured Development Establishment, during which further amphibious experiments and trials were undertaken. The waterline was raised in 1954 by the building up of a weir.

== Current uses and amenity ==
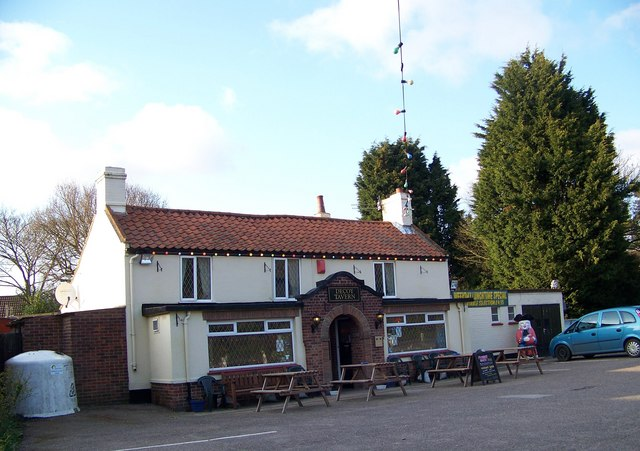
Nearby pub, the Decoy Tavern

Adjoining are a range of attractions:

- The Fritton Arms, a large pub with outdoor areas (open to members and their guests and paying holidaymakers only)
- Fritton Lake Woodland Lodges.

=== Access ===
Fritton Lake is a private members' club and holiday resort; non-members are not admitted other than as guests of members, or as holidaymakers staying in the retreats on site.

== Events ==
Fritton Lake Triathlon includes an open-water swim in the lake. Unseen reeds in parts of the lake mean that unsupervised swimming has been flagged by the owners as dangerous and forbidden.
