= Somerleyton Hall =

Grade II* listed house in Suffolk, England

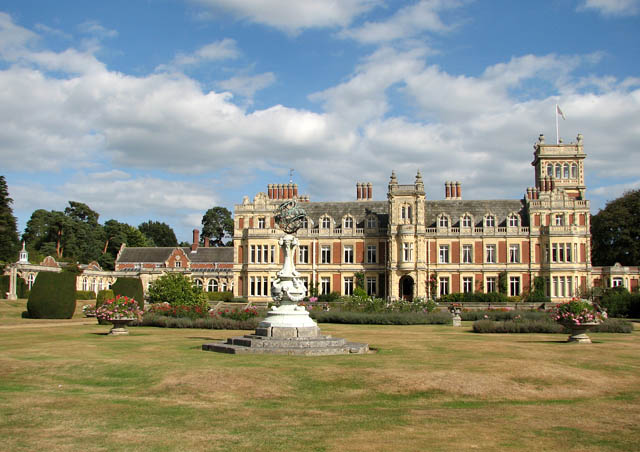
- The garden front

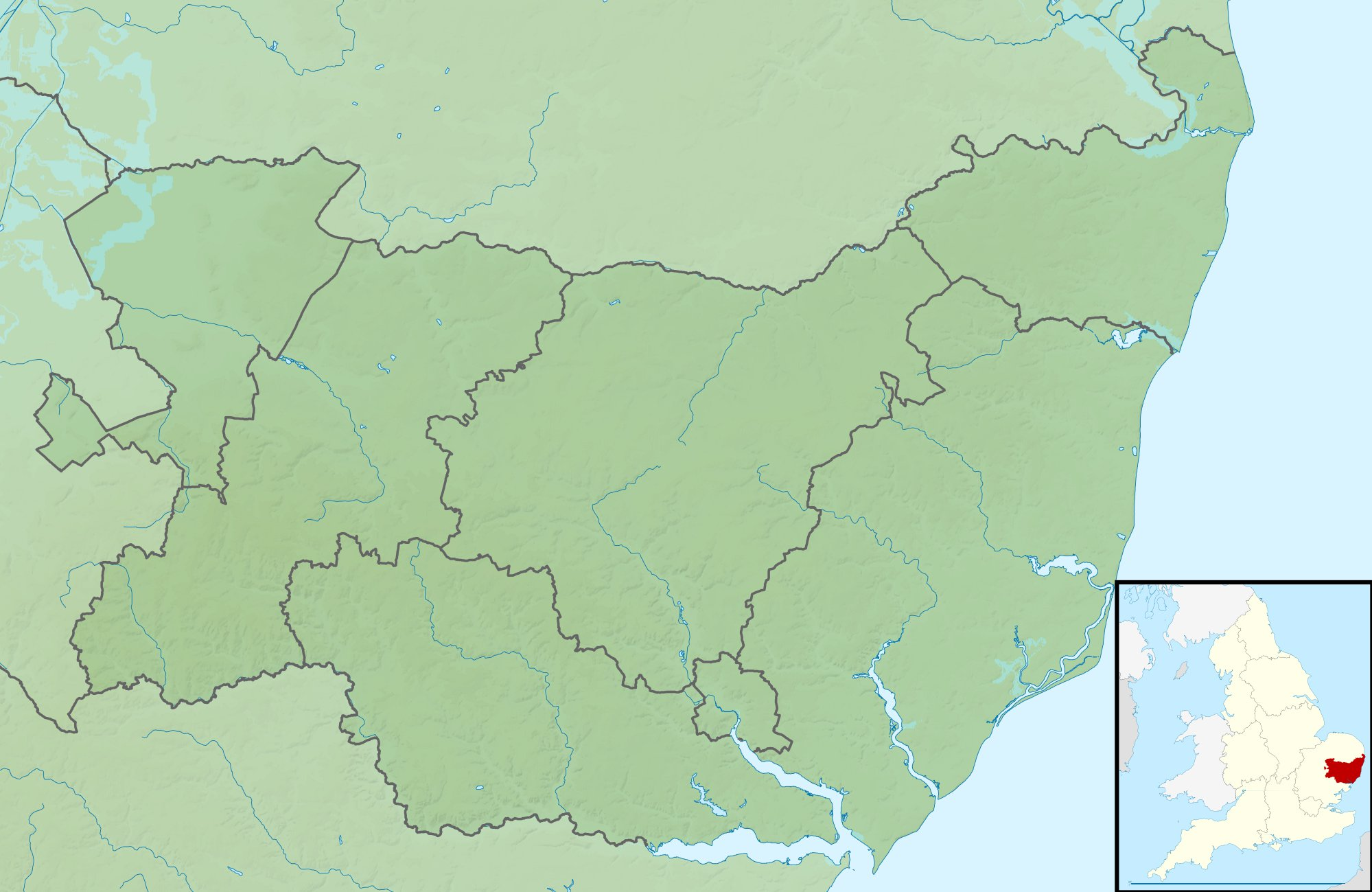
- Location within Suffolk
- 52.5207°N 1.6731°E
- Type: Country house
- Location: Somerleyton, Suffolk, England

History
- Built: Early modern period
- Rebuilt: 1840s

Site notes
- Architect: John Thomas (1840s)
- Architectural styles: Jacobean and Italianate
- Owner: Hugh Crossley, 4th Baron Somerleyton

Listed Building – Grade II*
- Official name: Somerleyton Hall
- Designated: 29 January 1987
- Reference no.: 1198046

Listed Building – Grade II*
- Official name: Stable Court to Somerleyton Hall
- Designated: 29 January 1987
- Reference no.: 1352646

Listed Building – Grade II*
- Official name: Kitchen Garden of Somerleyton Hall
- Designated: 29 January 1987
- Reference no.: 1031936

Listed Building – Grade II
- Official name: Remains of Winter Garden of Somerleyton Hall
- Designated: 29 January 1987
- Reference no.: 1031930

National Register of Historic Parks and Gardens
- Official name: Somerleyton Park
- Designated: 29 January 1987
- Reference no.: 1000188

Somerleyton Hall is a country house and 5,000-acre (2,000 ha) estate near Somerleyton in Suffolk, England. The hall is Grade II* listed on the National Heritage List for England, and its landscaped park and formal gardens are Grade II* listed on the Register of Historic Parks and Gardens. The property is owned and occupied by Hugh Crossley, 4th Baron Somerleyton, and the formal gardens cover 12 acres (4.9 ha). Inspired by Knepp Wildland, Lord Somerleyton is rewilding 1,000 acres (400 ha) of the estate, to which he has introduced free-roaming cattle, large black pigs and Exmoor ponies.

== History ==
In 1240, a manor house was built on the site by Sir Peter Fitzosbert, whose daughter married into the Jernegan family. The male line of the Fitzosberts ended, and the Jernegans held the estate until 1604. At that point, John Wentworth bought the estate. He transformed the main residence into a typical East Anglian Tudor-Jacobean mansion. It then passed to the Garney family. The next owner was Admiral Sir Thomas Allin, a native of Lowestoft. He took part in the Battle of Lowestoft (1665) and the Battle of Solebay at Southwold in 1672. Eventually, the male line of that family also died out.

In 1843, the Somerleyton estate was bought by the prosperous entrepreneur and MP Samuel Morton Peto. For the next seven years, he carried out extensive rebuilding, creating an Anglo-Italian architectural masterpiece. Paintings were specially commissioned for the house, and the gardens and grounds were completely redesigned. Peto had garden features designed by William Andrews Nesfield and Joseph Paxton. Peto's son, Harold Peto, became a noted garden-designer, but it is not known whether he was influenced by the gardens of Somerleyton.

In 1863, the estate was sold to Sir Francis Crossley of Halifax, West Yorkshire, a carpet manufacturer who, like Peto, was a philanthropist and Member of Parliament. Sir Francis' son Savile was created Baron Somerleyton in 1916. The family motto is 'Everything that is good comes from above'. Hugh Crossley, 4th Baron Somerleyton, inherited the hall in 2012, where he lives with his family.

The lake at Somerleyton Hall was used by Christopher Cockerell, the inventor of the hovercraft, to carry out his early experiments in 1955.

== Description ==
=== Hall ===
The hall is a Grade II* listed building. It was designed by John Thomas, an architect who had previously worked for Prince Albert, and was completed in 1850. The clock tower houses a clock designed by Benjamin Vulliamy. It is on the National Heritage List for England.

=== Formal gardens ===
Landscaped park and formal gardens are also Grade II* listed on the Register of Historic Parks and Gardens. The formal gardens cover 12 acres (4.9 ha) and form part of the 5,000-acre (2,000 ha) estate (7.7 square miles). They feature a yew hedge maze, one of the finest in Britain, created by William Andrews Nesfield in 1846, and a ridge and furrow greenhouse designed by Joseph Paxton, the architect of The Crystal Palace. There is also a walled garden, an aviary, a loggia and a 90-metre (300 ft) long pergola, covered with roses and wisteria. The more informal areas of the garden feature rhododendrons and azaleas and a fine collection of specimen trees. The kitchen garden and the stable court are both listed Grade II*. The ridge and furrow glasshouses north of the kitchen garden are listed Grade II. Several garden ornaments and statuary are listed; these include the statue of Atalanta, the group of four urns around the sundial, as well as the sundial, all are listed Grade II. In the formal gardens, the four urns in the centre and the four stone troughs are both listed Grade II. The remains of the Winter Garden and the boundary walling to the formal gardens are listed Grade II. The cistern at the south of the terrace to and the retaining wall to the garden front are listed Grade II. The screen wall to entrance front of the hall is Grade II listed. The South Lodge and the gates to Somerleyton Hall are listed Grade II.

=== Estate ===
Inspired by the success of Knepp Wildland, a pioneering rewilding project started by Sir Charles Burrell, 10th Baronet in West Sussex, Somerleyton has fenced and is rewilding 1,000 acres (400 ha) of the 5,000-acre (2,000 ha) estate (7.7 square miles), has introduced large black pigs, Exmoor ponies and 100 free-roaming cattle. The plan is to extend the scheme to 1,000 acres (400 ha) (20% of the estate), including the 150 acres (61 ha) Fritton Lake and 600 acres (240 ha) Suffolk Sandlings. Somerleyton is a founding trustee of WildEast, a charitable foundation that promotes regenerative farming and rewilding in the East Anglia.

== In popular culture ==
- In 1970, the house was the main set for the movie The Weekend Murders.
- In 1998, Lord and Lady Somerleyton commissioned the English artist Jonathan Myles-Lea, a specialist in country houses, gardens and estates, to paint Somerleyton Hall.
- The house and the maze, where the narrator becomes lost, feature prominently in W. G. Sebald's 1995 novel-memoir The Rings of Saturn.
- The house and grounds were used to stand in for Sandringham House in Stephen Poliakoff's 2003 television drama The Lost Prince,
- The house in Peter Morgan's 2020 series The Crown.
- The house and its grounds featured as the principal location in "Neck", the sixth episode in the first series of Tales of the Unexpected (1979).
- The house and gardens were used in the "Norfolk" episode of the 1989 gameshow Interceptor.
- The 1993 gameshow Time Busters episode "The Strange Legacy of Somerweston Hall".
- The house and gardens were the setting of the film Lady (United Kingdom release 16 October 2025, BFI London Film Festival)

== Gallery ==
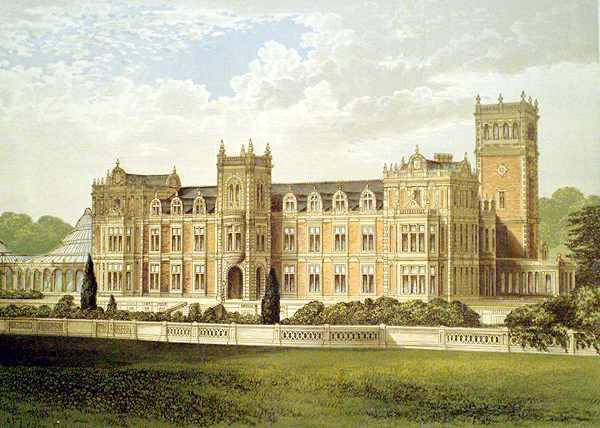
Somerleyton Hall in 1880. The Winter Garden (conservatory) on the left was demolished in 1914

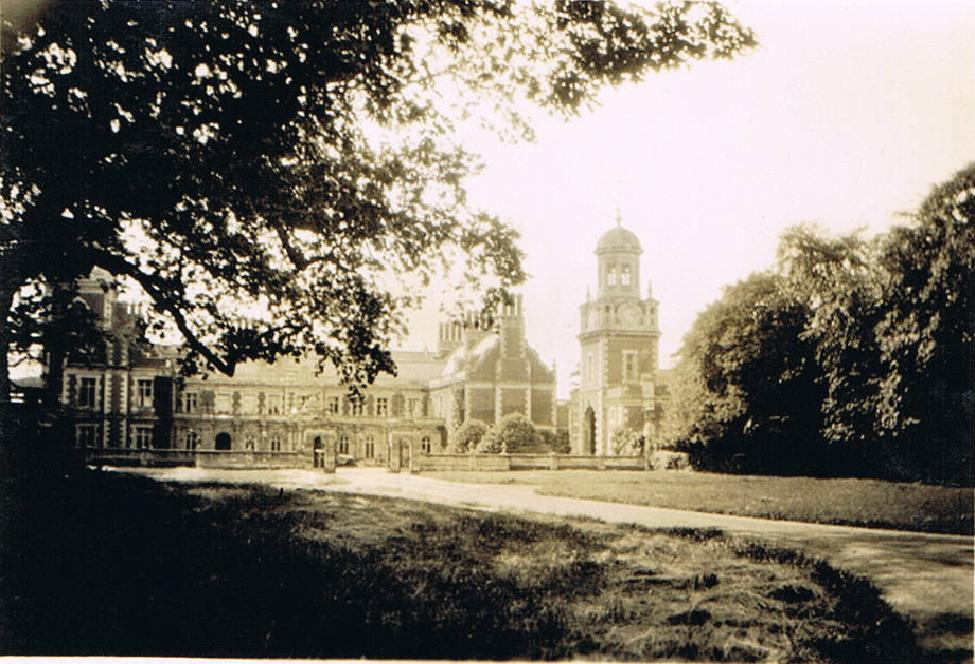
Somerleyton Hall in 1930

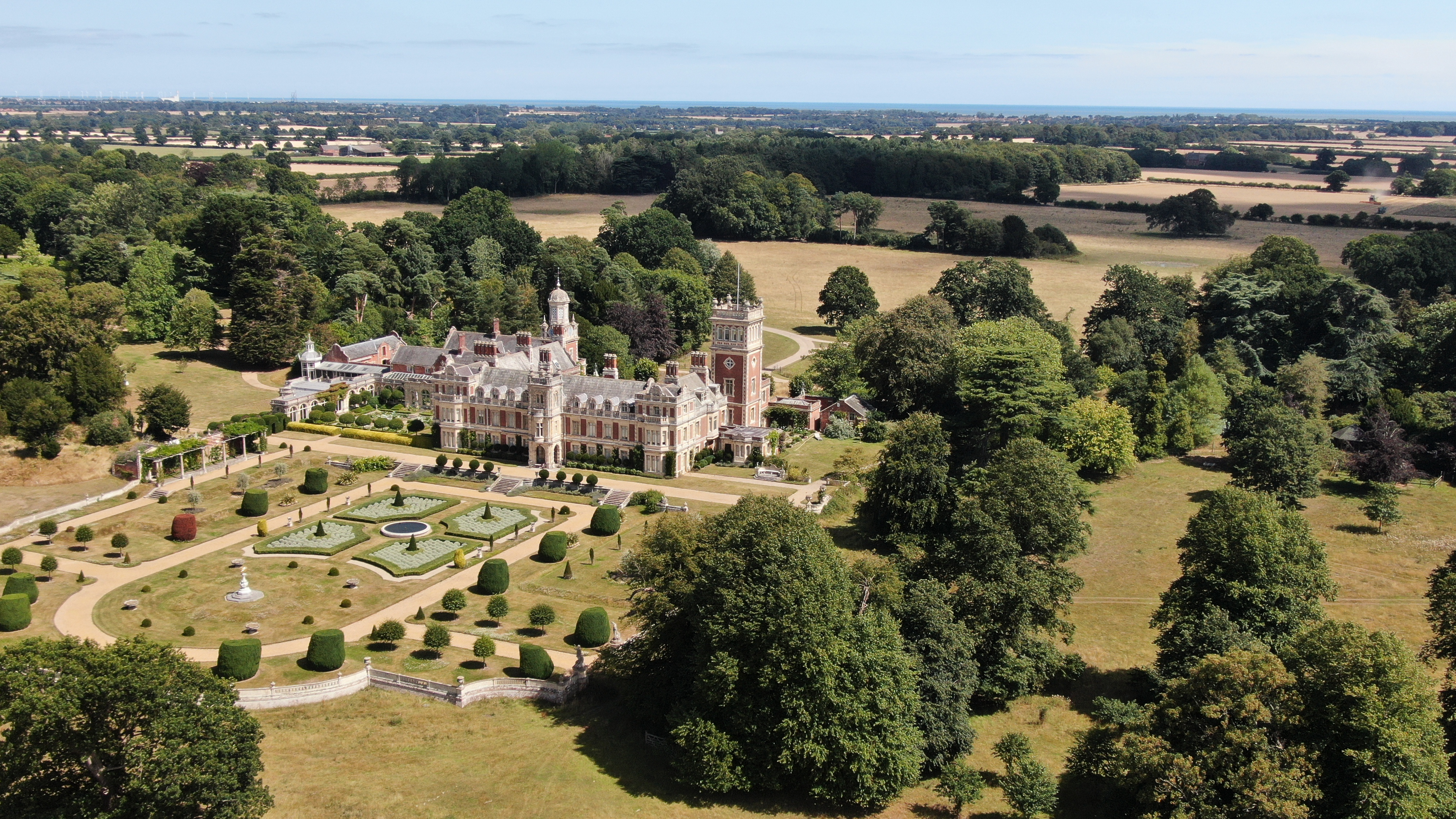
Aerial view

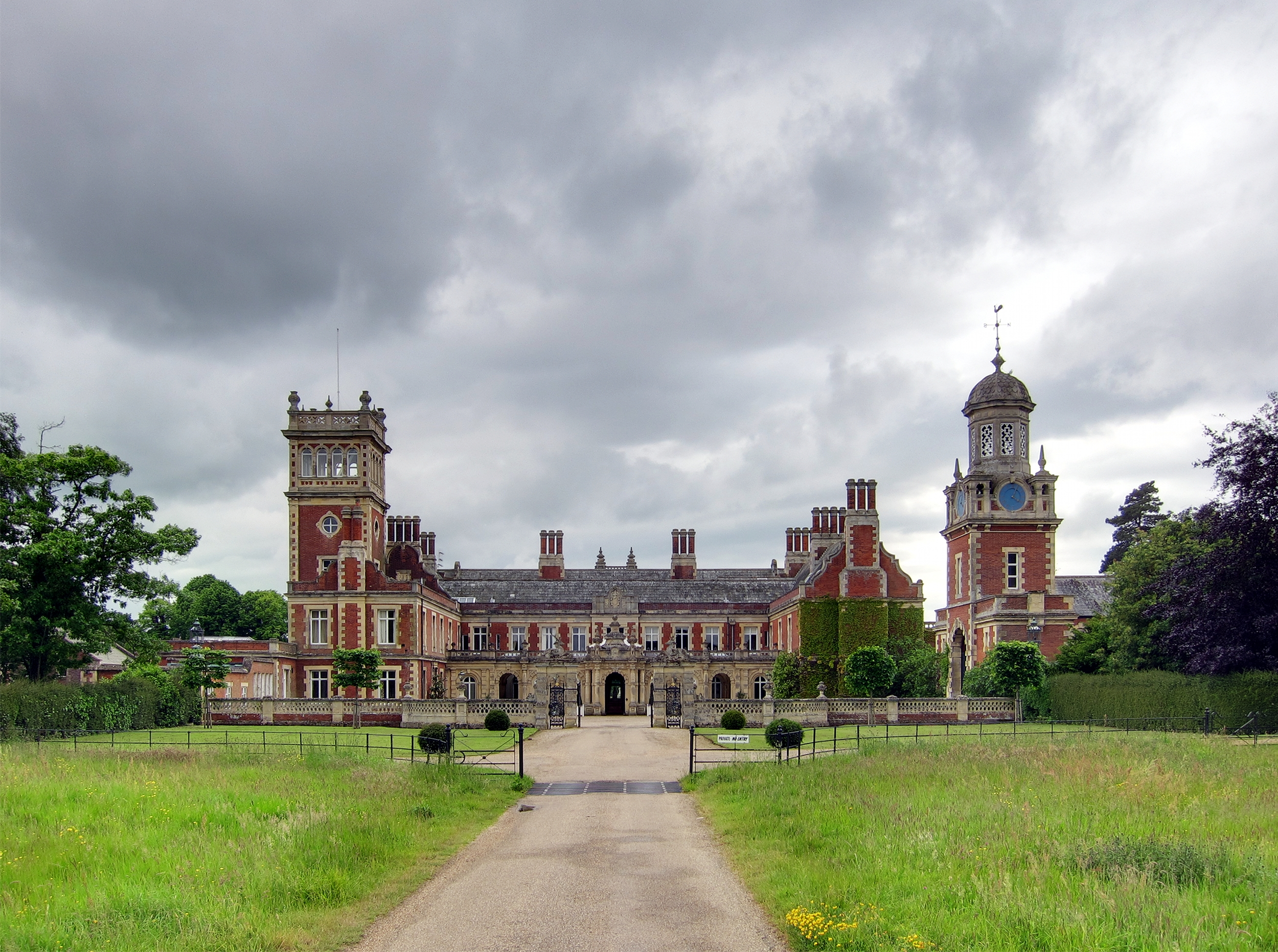
The entrance to the hall

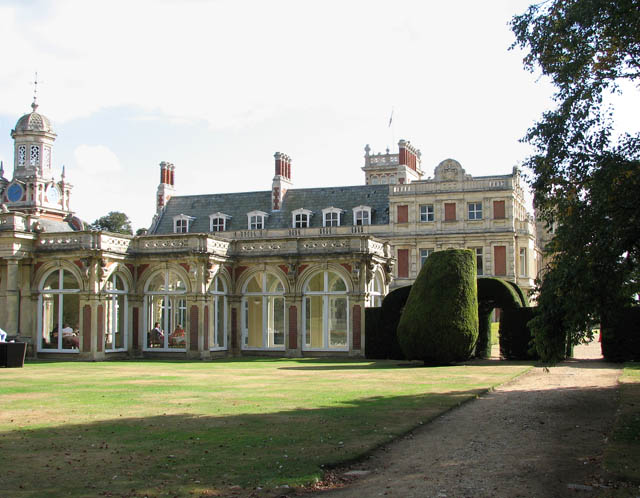
The Orangery

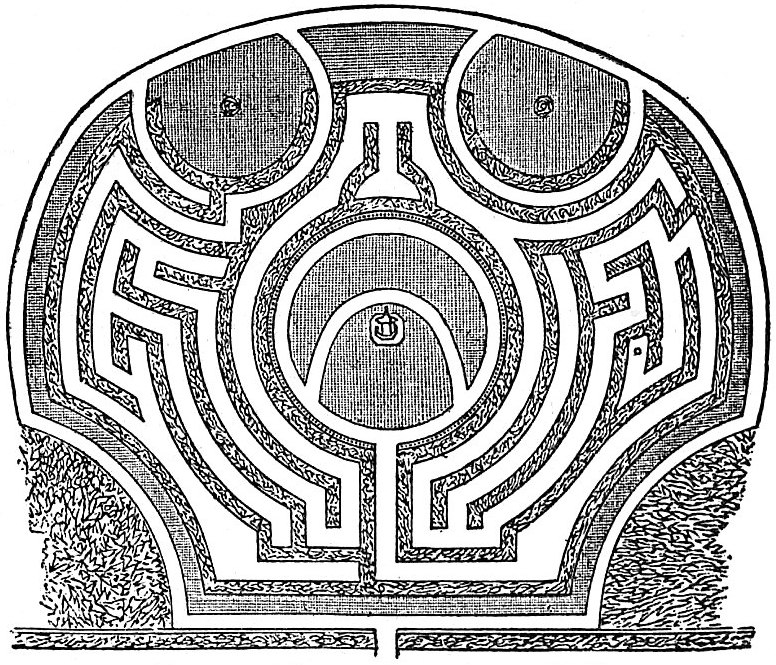
The maze garden map

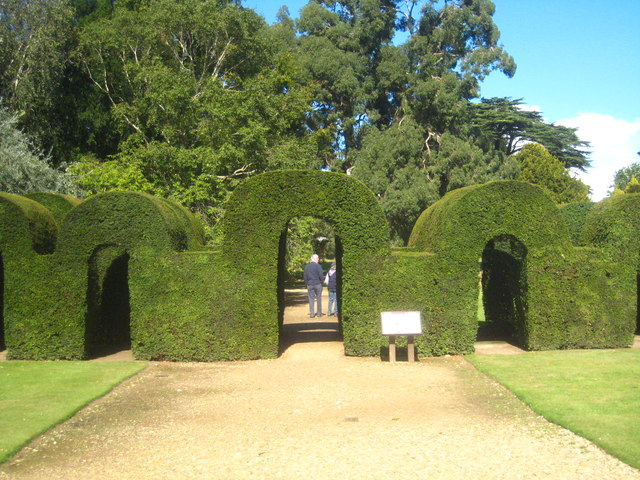
Topiary archways
