= Margaret Sewell =

English educator

Margaret Sewell (1852–1937) was an English educator who was Warden of the Women's University Settlement. She was a pioneer advocate of social work.

== Early life and background ==
She was the daughter of the civil engineer and banker Philip Edward Sewell (1822–1906), son of Isaac Sewell and his wife Mary Wright Sewell; the author Anna Sewell was her aunt. She was born in Brighton on 10 November 1852.

Margaret Sewell was tutored privately, and entered Newnham College, Cambridge in 1884. She left Cambridge in 1887 with a second class in the Natural Science Tripos Part I. At the time women could not take Cambridge degrees: she was awarded an M.A. in 1928.

=== John Wright of Dudwick ===
In 1853, the Buxton Reformatory for Boys, which would play a large part in Margaret Sewell's life, was founded near Buxton, Norfolk by a group including her great-uncle John Wright and Edward North Buxton, John Henry Gurney and George Kett. John Wright (1794–1871) of Dudwick House was a Quaker and pioneer in the reformatory movement that sought to reduce the harshness of punishments for adolescent offenders. From 1850 he gave jobs to discharged young offenders on his farms. He called a meeting in 1852 with the result that a settlement was founded in the Buxton area for 40 offenders under the age of 20. It was located at Marsham and became a certified reformatory in 1855.

=== Philip Edward Sewell ===
Margaret Sewell's father Philip Edward Sewell was in later life a landowner, known as a benefactor.

He was born into a Quaker family, was brought up in Hackney, then just outside London, after his father Isaac's drapery business failed, and went to Hackney Grammar School from 1829. The Sewells moved to Stoke Newington in 1832, and Mary Sewell left the Quakers in 1836. Philip also left the Quakers, at age around 18.

Schooled further at the Friends' School in Stoke Newington, Sewell went to work with his father Isaac in the London and County Bank. He entered Queens' College, Cambridge in 1844, but left for health reasons. He became a professional civil engineer under Charles Blacker Vignoles. He worked on the Settle–Carlisle line. He was also employed on work on the harbour at Seaham.

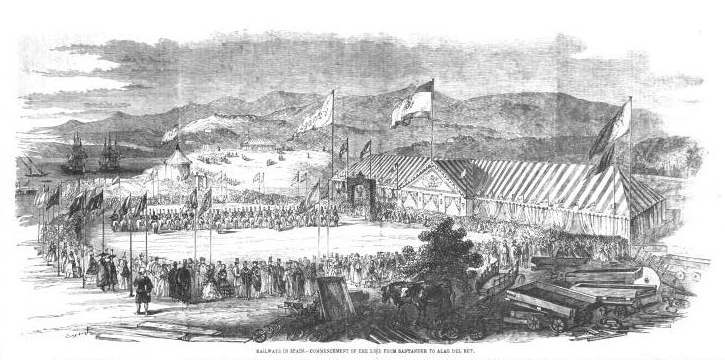
Engraving of the opening in 1852 of the Isabel II. railway line from Santander to Alar del Rey

From 1850 Sewell was working in Spain, where he remained for a decade, and the family moved to Santander. He was engineer-in-chief of the Isabel II. railway line from Santander to Alar del Rey. For the Tudela–Bilbao railway, he assisted Henry Vignoles with the diversion of the River Ebro.

Sewell joined the Norwich and Norfolk Bank in 1864. He was involved with the Society for Aiding Discharged Prisoners and the Norwich City Mission, and was elected to the first Norfolk County Council. In 1870, he married again, to Charlotte Jane Sole.

=== Buxton Reformatory and the Red House School ===
Buxton Reformatory was inherited by Philip Edward Sewell, with his uncle John Wright's estate. It was later known as the Red House Farm School, and was demolished in 2002. On the site now is Rowan House hospital. It had been The Red House Community Home School from 1973 to 1981.

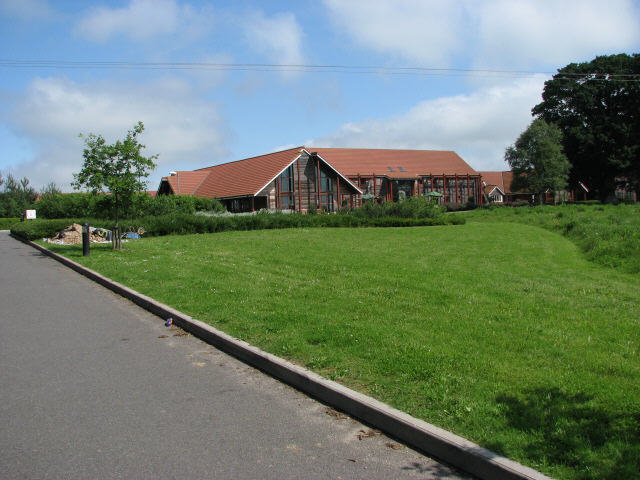
Rowan House hospital, Norfolk, 2007 photograph

=== Family ===
Sewell married Sarah Woods, Margaret's mother, in 1849; in the same year, Isaac left the bank, and went into business on his own account. Sarah was the daughter of Samuel Woods (1772–1853), and sister of Edward Woods: they had three sons and five daughters. She died in 1866, at age 45. Their children included the suffragist (Lucy) Edith Sewell of the National Union of Women's Suffrage Societies.

== The Women's University Settlement ==
The Women's University Settlement (WUS) in Southwark was founded in 1887; in 1889 Margaret Sewell and Edith Argles began setting up social work training there. The WUS operated a policy of giving free accommodation to female college students in London, in exchange for voluntary social work. Sewell gave lectures and trained through discussion; her approach was then taken up by Octavia Hill and applied in the 1890s at the Sociological School, the forerunner of the Department of Social Science and Administration at the London School of Economics.

Alice Gruner was made Head Worker of the Women's University Association, the initial form of the Settlement, in 1887 as it was formed. When she resigned the post in 1889, there was a hiatus, during which Sewell held the lease of 44 Nelson Square, the Settlement's base just off the Blackfriars Road, Southwark, and a replacement was sought. Later that year Katharine Coman contacted Sewell, visited for two weeks, and returned to New York with plans for a settlement there.

Sewell became Warden of the Settlement, a paid position, in 1891. Meriel Talbot took on some house management duties on behalf of Octavia Hill, which Gruner had on her onerous list of jobs.

In 1901 Helen Gladstone replaced Sewell as Warden, after ten years in the post and some poor health.

=== Settlement accommodation ===
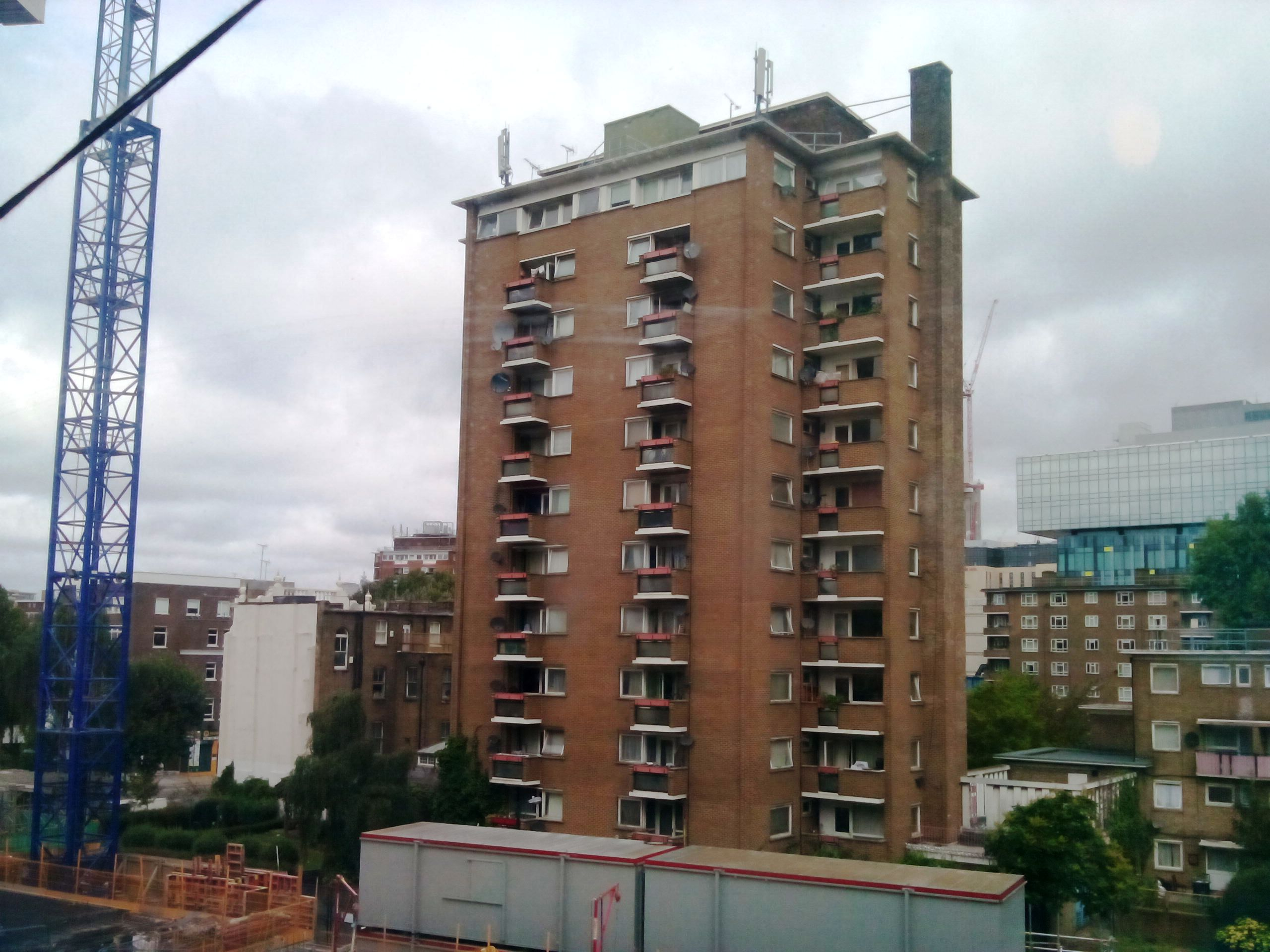
Helen Gladstone House, Nelson Square, Southwark, 2014 photograph

Nelson Square consisted of high terraces built in the period 1807–1810. Not much now remains of the original buildings: a World War II bombing raid did damage to those that housed the Settlement. The 1912 Victoria County History of Surrey wrote that the Square "presents a pleasing old-world appearance". Comment on the school for invalid children at the WUS ("who are able to go out, but are not strong enough to go to school") in 1894, said that "Nelson Square, with its trees and open space, is the one spot in a neighbourhood of slums and busy thoroughfares that is suited for such a home". The WUS under Margaret Sewell was credited with the innovation: in 1893 "the settlement arranged for the first 'Invalid Centre,' a modest attempt with a nucleus of six to ten children".

Octavia Hill was heavily involved by the 1890s with the management of Southwark property belonging to the Ecclesiastical Commissioners. Late in the 20th century the Settlement was still operating from the remaining terrace in Nelson Square, in property acquired with her help. To add to 44 Nelson Square, freeholds were bought in the Square, one by Hill's companion Harriott Yorke, and terraced housing behind those.

=== Scholars and lectures ===
In 1892, Hill and Sewell worked together to secure endowment from the Pfeiffer Trust for two training course scholarships at the WUS.

The first Pfeiffer Scholar from 1894 was Mary McNicoll Sharpley (1867–1932), known as Minnie, sister of Edith Sharpley, and a Newnham College student who took the Moral Sciences Tripos Part I in 1893. She became in 1895, after a year at the WUS, a London-based lecturer on social work and economics, funded by the Joint Committee on Social Education. The committee involved the Charity Organisation Society (COS) and National Union of Women Workers (NUWW), with Louise Creighton on it, as well as the WUS, who were represented by Eleanor Powell (treasurer) and Clara Collet.

Sewell herself lectured for COS and NUWW voluntary workers: a course of 1896 covered "Economics, Poor Law, Local Government, Education, Sanitation, Principles of Organisation and Relief, Thrift". Eleanor Grace Powell, daughter of Thomas Wilde Powell, was co-author of an 1898 paper with Sewell on women's settlements.

Elizabeth Macadam, awarded one of the scholarships, said that those influenced by Sewell in the 1890s were "privileged indeed". She had previously been at a settlement in Canning Town, stayed four years in Southwark where she was employed to teach at an evening school for adolescents, and in 1902 became warden at the Victoria Women's Settlement in Liverpool. Susan Pedersen breaks down what she gained from the WUS social work milieu, from Sewell and others, as regard for practical training, and a view of civic action. Sewell wrote a chapter for Macadam's The Equipment of the Social Worker (1925).

The change of Warden in 1901 meant a change of policy: the Settlement withdrew from the Joint Committee to concentrate its resources in-house. Sewell sat on the replacement Lectures Committee, with Octavia Hill, Bernard Bosanquet, Eleanor Powell and others, working to ensure continuity. Minnie Sharpley's lecturing position finished in 1902, however: she subsequently worked with Geoffrey Drage.

A later Pfeiffer Scholarship recipient was Eleanor Kelly, who went on to Boots and the Welfare Workers' Institute.

== Later life ==
From 1906 to 1937 Margaret Sewell was Manager of the Red House School at Marsham, which was confirmed as an industrial school in 1894, and given status as a Home Office approved school in 1933. In 1908 Margaret opened Sewell Park, Norwich, land for which had been given by her father.

In 1935 Margaret Sewell was awarded the Jubilee Medal. She died on 17 November 1937.

== Views ==
Sewell took the settlement movement's work to be "an adaptation of accepted methods to special conditions of society." More fully,

"the idea, if idea it can be called, is to do consciously and with a definite purpose, where population was dense, that which is done unconsciously, and without effort, almost everywhere else."

A report of her paper to the 1892 Conference of Women at Bristol summed it up as "while the greatest skill and knowledge is required for work amongst the poor, no one seems, as a rule, to regard any qualification but the desire a necessary one." According to Seth Koven, Sewell "sought to differentiate her progressive agenda for training women workers from popular perceptions of women's philanthropy [...]".

These views were consistent with, and built up in the direction of instruction, the orthodoxy of the Charity Organisation Society, of which Sewell was secretary when in 1891 she was recruited as Warden of the WUS. The COS view amounted to saying that characterising the "deserving poor" is an investigative matter that does not lie on the surface. Around that time, with Henry Valpy Toynbee and Herbert Louis Woollcombe, Sewell was an evident London leader in the practical application of COS doctrine. By 1896 there was a larger, recognised group of 22, 12 men and 10 women, in the field of "standards" applicable to those qualifying for charity. Jane Addams wrote to Mary Rozet Smith in 1896 describing a rather chilly attitude to "the poor" at a Settlement meeting, held in the nearby Red Cross Hall, Whitecross Street. The Hall had recently had been built by Octavia Hill, and Addams liked it: "the prettiest little spot I have seen in a London slum".

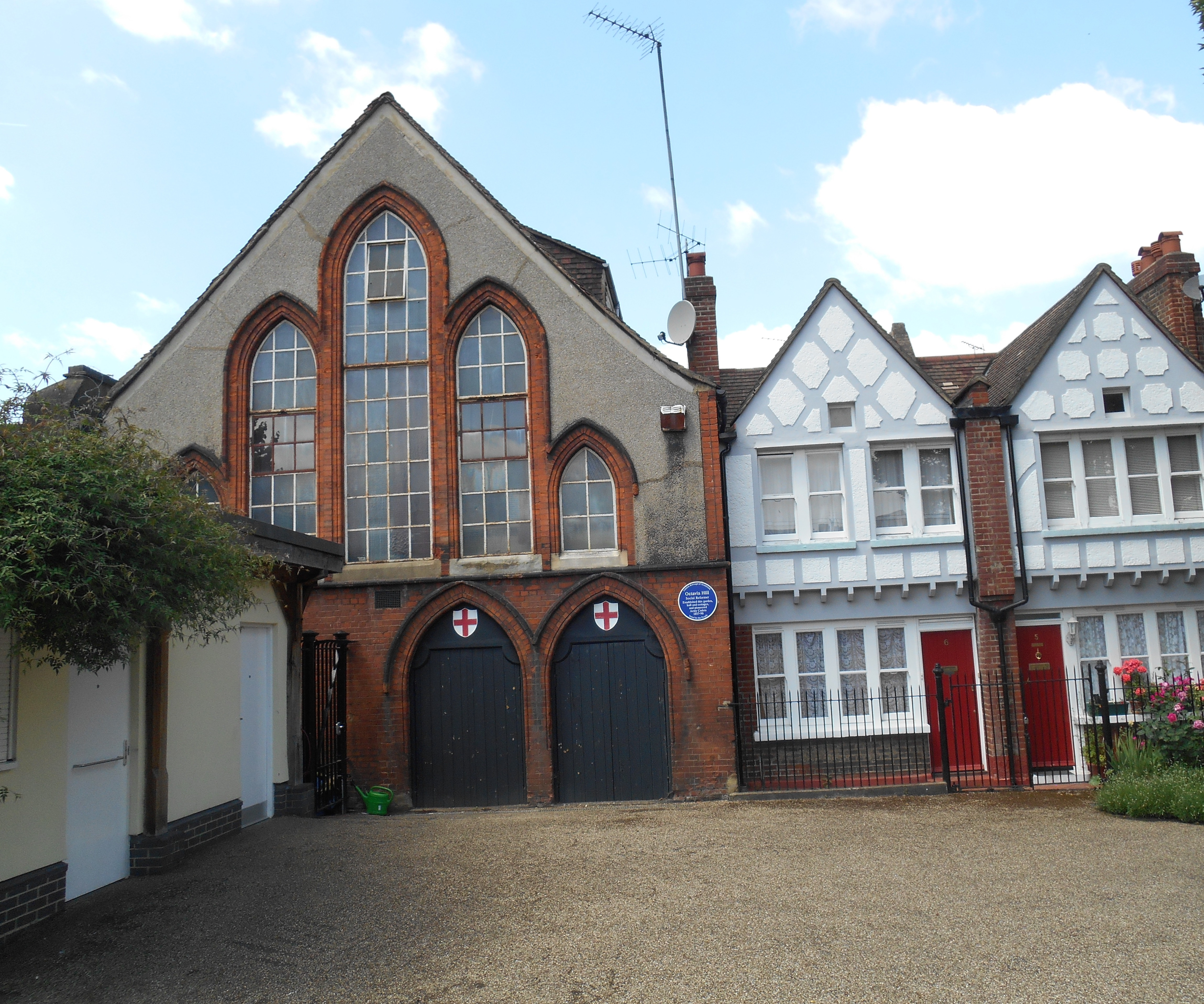
Octavia Hill's Red Cross Hall, now Ayres Street, Southwark, 2014 photograph
