= 1905 Whitby by-election =

UK parliamentary by-election

| ← 1900 | 1 June 1905 | 1906 → |
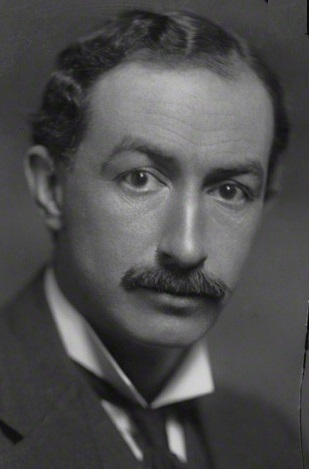

| Candidate | Buxton | Beckett |
| Party | Liberal | Conservative |
| Popular vote | 4,547 | 4,102 |
| Percentage | 52.6% | 47.4% |
MP before election
Ernest Beckett
Conservative
Subsequent MP
Gervase Beckett
Conservative

The Whitby by-election was a Parliamentary by-election held on 1 June 1905. The constituency returned one Member of Parliament (MP) to the House of Commons of the United Kingdom, elected by the first past the post voting system.

== Vacancy ==
Ernest Beckett had been Conservative MP for the seat of Whitby since the 1885 general election. He succeeded to the title of Baron Grimthorpe on the death of his uncle on 29 April 1905.

== Electoral history ==
The seat had been Conservative since 1885. They held the seat at the last election, unopposed:

General election 1900: Whitby
| Party | Candidate | Votes | % | ±% |
|---|---|---|---|---|
| Conservative | Ernest Beckett | Unopposed | N/A | N/A |
| Conservative hold | | | | |

== Candidates ==
The Conservatives selected 39-year-old Gervase Beckett as their candidate to defend the seat. Beckett was the younger brother of the previous MP. He was commissioned a Lieutenant in the 3rd (Militia) Battalion, Green Howards in 1884, but resigned his commission in 1886. He was commissioned a Second Lieutenant in the Yorkshire Hussars in 1888. He was promoted Lieutenant in 1895 and Captain in 1898, and resigned his commission in 1901

Buxton

The local Liberal Association selected 36-year-old Noel Buxton to challenge for the seat. In 1896, Buxton acted as Aide-de-Camp to his father during his time as Governor of South Australia. He served on the Whitechapel Board of Guardians and Central Unemployment Body, and was a Member of the Home Office Departmental Committee on Lead Poisoning. Buxton stood unsuccessfully for Ipswich in 1900. He had taken a deep interest in temperance reform and was closely connected with East-end settlement work. Despite his interest in temperance reform, Buxton's candidature ran into problems with the Temperance movement who traditionally were supporters of Liberal candidates. The executive of the North of England Temperance League protested to the Liberal Party leader Sir Henry Campbell-Bannerman on account of Buxton's supposed brewery interests. They threatened the Liberal Party that if they did not withdraw Buxton's candidature, the league would actively oppose him. The Liberal Party ignored the threat and Buxton remained as candidate.

== Campaign ==
Beckett

Polling Day was fixed for 1 June 1905.

Beckett, the Conservative candidate, was happy to support the Unionist Government's Education Act 1902, despite the fact that it increased rates in parts of the constituency to help pay for Protestant schools. He claimed that agricultural tenants would benefit from rate relief due to the renewal of the Agricultural Rates Act. He was in favour of the Unionist Government's plans to look at introducing trade tariffs. He also opposed Home Rule for Ireland. Beckett's pro-Protestant positions unsurprisingly won him the endorsement of the Whitby Protestant Electoral Council, who had sent questions to both candidates about issues of their concern. Both candidates replies were considered and the council favoured that of Beckett so much that they urged all Whitby's Protestant voters to vote for and campaign for Beckett.

== Result ==
Buxton and the Liberal campaign managed to overcome their difficulties and gained the seat:

Whitby by-election, 1905
| Party | Candidate | Votes | % | ±% |
|---|---|---|---|---|
| Liberal | Noel Buxton | 4,547 | 52.6 | New |
| Conservative | Gervase Beckett | 4,102 | 47.4 | N/A |
| Majority | | 445 | 5.2 | N/A |
| Turnout | | 8,649 | 79.7 | N/A |
| Liberal gain from Conservative | | Swing | N/A | |

Speaking on the result, Buxton, the Liberal victor, remarked that the Whitby result was even better than the Liberal victory at Brighton two months earlier. He described the Whitby result as a "great victory for truth, for the cause of the working man and for liberty throughout the world".

== Aftermath ==
Beckett re-gained the seat at the subsequent General Election:

General election 1906: Whitby
| Party | Candidate | Votes | % | ±% |
|---|---|---|---|---|
| Conservative | Gervase Beckett | 4,780 | 50.4 | +3.0 |
| Liberal | Noel Buxton | 4,709 | 49.6 | −3.0 |
| Majority | | 71 | 0.8 | N/A |
| Turnout | | 9,489 | 84.2 | +4.5 |
| Conservative gain from Liberal | | Swing | +3.0 | |
