= Meriel Talbot =

British public servant and women's welfare worker

Dame Meriel Talbot DBE
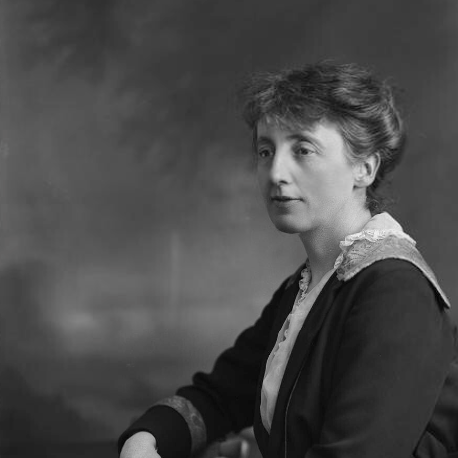
- Meriel Talbot, 1918, by Bassano Ltd

Director of the Women's Branch, Board of Agriculture and Fisheries
- In office 1917–1920

Secretary to the Victoria League
- In office 1901–1916

Personal details
- Born: Meriel Lucy Talbot; 16 June 1866 Westminster, London, England
- Died: 15 December 1956 (aged 90)
- Occupation: Public servant, women's welfare worker
- Known for: Organised the Women's Land Army (World War I) and edited their magazine The Landswoman.

Dame Meriel Lucy Talbot, DBE (16 June 1866 – 15 December 1956) was a British public servant and women's welfare worker. During the First World War, she organised the Women's Land Army and edited their magazine The Landswoman.

Talbot was born in Westminster, the daughter of the politician John Gilbert Talbot and his wife, Meriel Sarah, daughter of George Lyttelton, 4th Baron Lyttelton. She was educated at Kensington High School.

During the 1880s and 1890s Meriel Talbot participated in the settlement movement. She was secretary, jointly with Idina Brassey, of the Bethnal Green Ladies' Committee in 1889, chaired by her mother. In 1891 she combined work at the Women's University Settlement (WUS) for the Children's Country Holiday Fund, the post of secretary to the Ladies' Branch of Oxford House (again chaired by her mother), and social work training at the WUS relating to the Metropolitan Association for Befriending Young Servants. She also took on some of the house management work that had fallen to Margaret Sewell, the incoming Warden of WUS. In 1897, again with Idina Brassey, she was joint secretary in the newly formed West End Association.

From 1901 to 1916 she served as secretary to the Victoria League, and in this capacity travelled widely throughout the British Empire.

In 1915, she served on the official advisory committee for repatriating enemy aliens. The following year she was appointed the first woman inspector with the Board of Agriculture and Fisheries and in 1917 she became director of the Women's Branch of the Board, in charge of the recruitment and co-ordination of the Women's Land Army. The Land Army had 23,000 recruits by the end of the war and there was a monthly magazine named The Landswoman which Talbot edited.

Talbot stayed at the new Ministry of Agriculture after the First World War and was named adviser on women's employment in 1920.

She retired in 1921, but continued to perform public work, serving as intelligence officer for the Overseas Settlement Department and on a number of official committees, including the Royal Commission on Police Powers and Procedure in 1929. In the 1930s she became chairman of the BBC Central Appeals Advisory Committee. From 1935 to 1951 she was chairman of the London Council for the Welfare of Women and Girls.

For her work with the Board of Agriculture she was appointed Officer of the Order of the British Empire (OBE) in the first list of the Order in 1917, Commander of the Order of the British Empire (CBE) in 1918 and Dame Commander of the Order of the British Empire (DBE) in the 1920 civilian war honours.
