= Auguste Schlüter =

German domestic servant and biographer (1849–1917)

- Born: 27 June 1849; Kingdom of Hanover
- Died: Autumn 1917; Hanover

Auguste Schlüter (27 June 1849 – Autumn 1917) was a German-born domestic servant to the British Gladstone family, and a biographer. Her posthumously published memoirs were titled A Lady's Maid in Downing Street.

== Early life ==
Auguste Schlüter was born in the Kingdom of Hanover, on 27 June 1849. She had a sister who later lived in New York.

== Career ==
Her life changed when she was seventeen when she was employed in England by the politician and Prime Minister William and Catherine Gladstone. Schlüter did not speak much English but she decided to keep a diary as she worked as a maid looking after two of her employers' daughters, Mary and Helen Gladstone.

When Mary Gladstone married Henry Drew in 1886, Catherine Gladstone appointed Schlüter as her personal maid. In November 1890 Schlüter returned to Hanover to look after her ailing mother. She maintained contact with the Gladstone family, writing and making some visits. She corresponded with them throughout the First World War, although her final letter of 20 March 1917, written to Mary Drew, did not reach her until after the end of the war.

Schlüter died in Hanover during the autumn of 1917.

== Diaries ==
Her diary, written in an exercise book, was discovered after she left Britain and published posthumously in 1922 as A Lady's Maid in Downing Street. The book gives an interesting view of upper class life although critics observed that Schlüter was living at the centre of government but only small details of world events made it into her book.
