= Charles Bagnall =

British politician

Charles Bagnall JP (1827–1884) was a British politician.

Charles Bagnall was born in West Bromwich, Staffordshire, England, and educated at King's College London. He was a Justice of the Peace for Staffordshire and the North Riding. He was elected Conservative Member of Parliament for Whitby at the 1865 general election and held the seat until 1868. He only became the candidate for the Whitby seat two days before the election because the chosen candidate George Hudson (the Railway King) was arrested for unpaid debts in a move manufactured by his political opponent in Whitby, the Liberal Harry Thompson.

He married Harriet Curtis (born Whitby 1839) on 1 November 1860 in All Saints, Hornsey, Middlesex and they had five boys and three girls. The 1881 census showed Bagnall living at Sneaton Castle (near Whitby) and listed as an Ironmaster employing 450 men and boys.

In his obituary published in the Times on 27 February 1884 stated Bagnall had "formerly held a lieutenant's commission in the Staffordshire Yeomanry Cavalry"

Parliament of the United Kingdom
Preceded by Harry Stephen Thompson	Member of Parliament for Whitby; 1865–1868	Succeeded by William Henry Gladstone
