= William Henry Gladstone =

British politician (1840–1891)

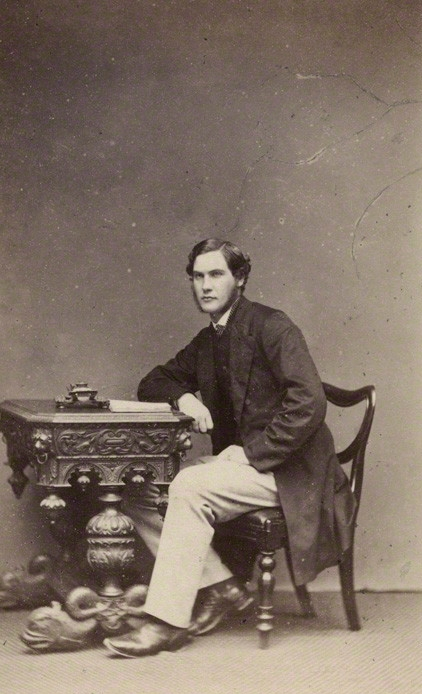
- Gladstone c. 1865

MP for Chester
- In office 1865–1868
- Preceded by: Earl Grosvenor; Philip Stapleton Humberston
- Succeeded by: Earl Grosvenor; Henry Cecil Raikes

MP for Whitby
- In office 1868–1880
- Preceded by: Charles Bagnall
- Succeeded by: Arthur Pease

MP for East Worcestershire
- In office 1880–1885
- Preceded by: Henry Allsopp; Thomas Eades Walker
- Succeeded by: George Woodyatt Hastings

Personal details
- Born: 3 June 1840 Hawarden, Wales
- Died: 4 July 1891 (aged 51) London, England
- Resting place: Hawarden, Flintshire, Wales
- Party: Liberal Party
- Spouse: Gertrude Stuart
- Children: Evelyn Catherine Gladstone (1882–1958); Constance Gertrude Gladstone (1883–1963); William Glynne Charles Gladstone (1885–1915)
- Parents: William Ewart Gladstone (father); Catherine Glynne (mother)
- Relatives: Henry Gladstone (brother); Herbert Gladstone (brother); Helen Gladstone (sister); Thomas Gladstone (uncle); Sir John Gladstone, 3rd Baronet (1st cousin)
- Education: Eton College
- Alma mater: Christ Church, Oxford

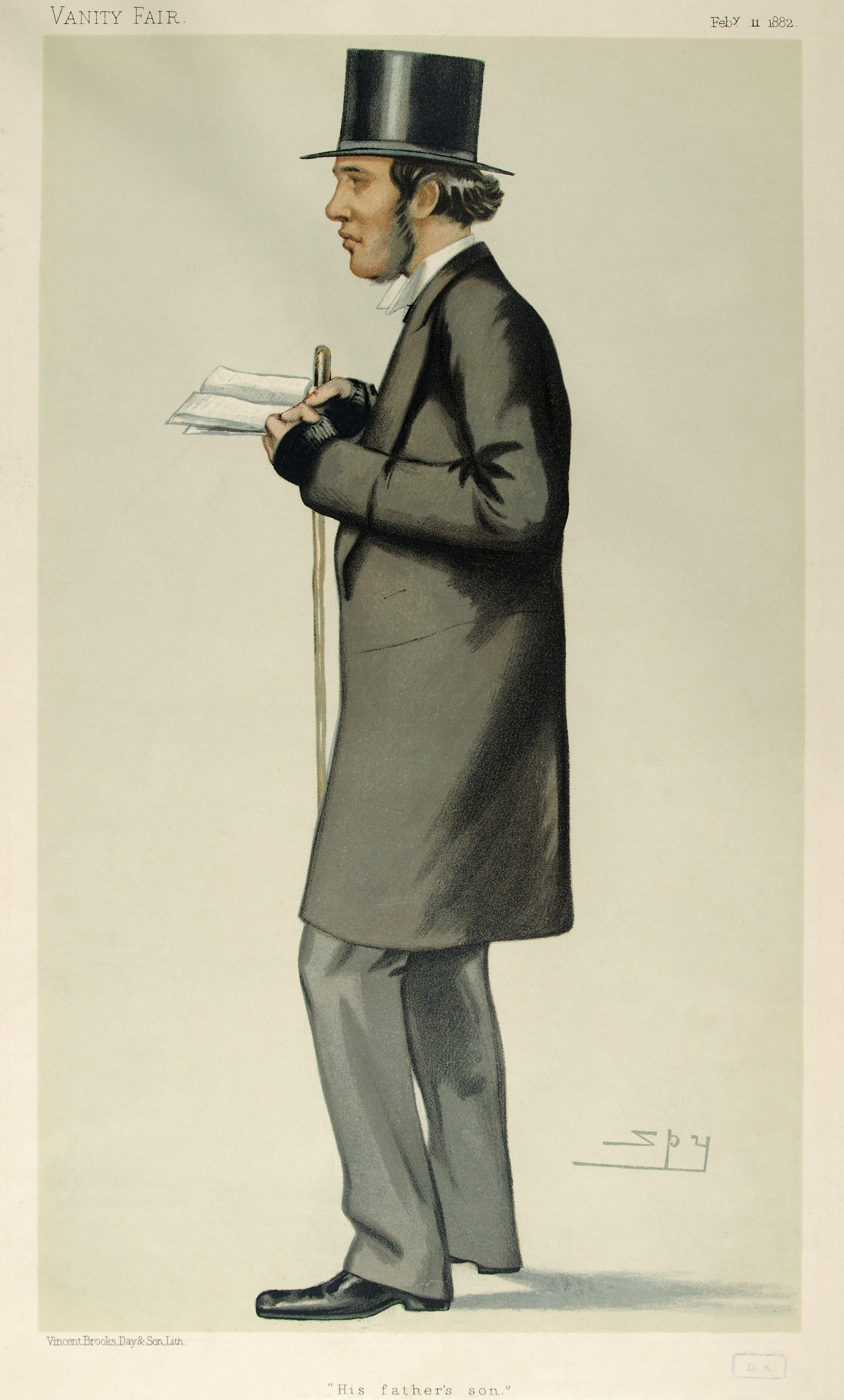
Caricature by Spy published in Vanity Fair in 1882

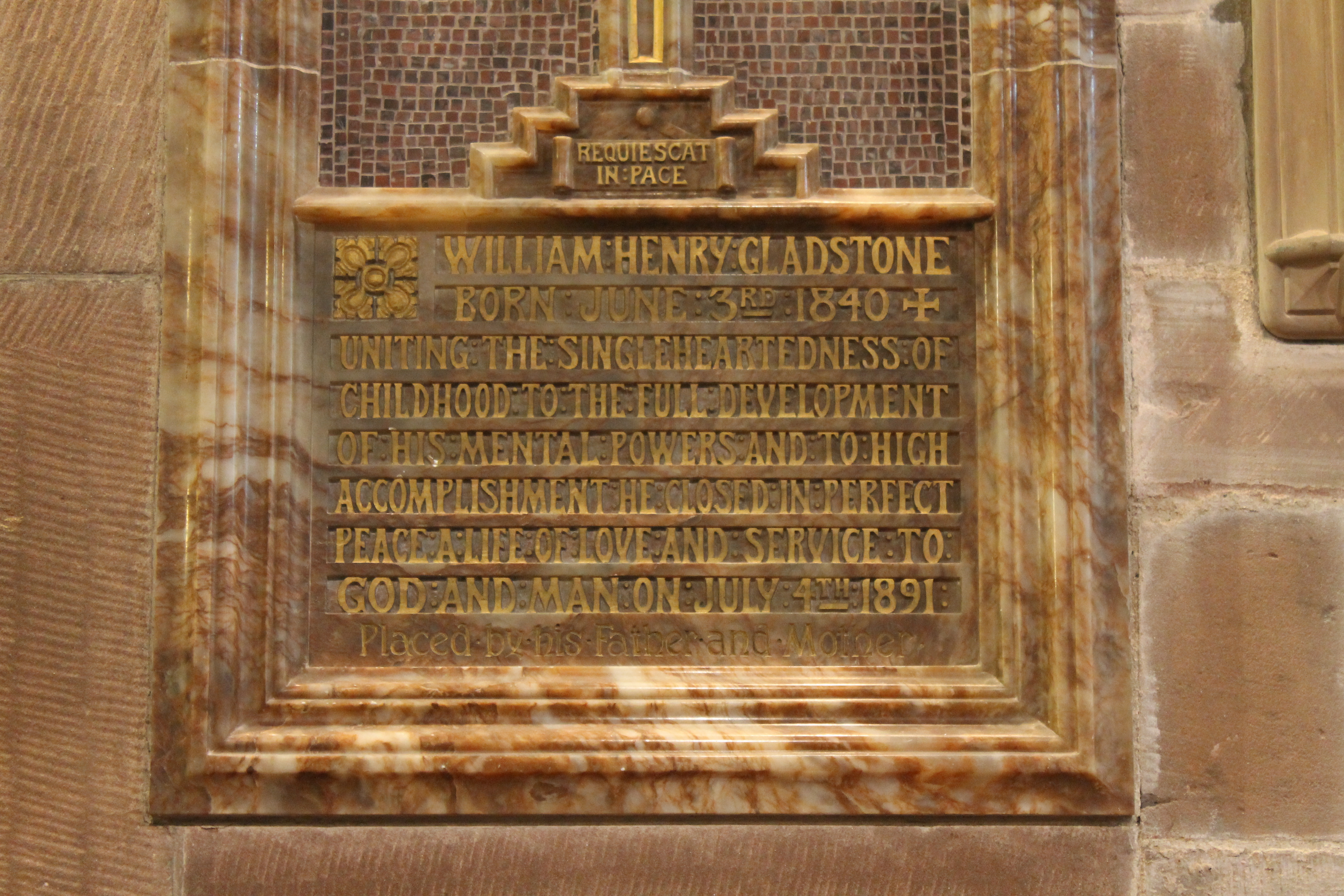
Funerary monument to Gladstone at St Deiniol's Church, Hawarden

William Henry Gladstone (3 June 1840 – 4 July 1891) was a British Liberal Party Member of Parliament, and the eldest son of Prime Minister William Ewart Gladstone and his wife Catherine née Glynne.

== Life ==
Gladstone was born in Hawarden, Flintshire, Wales. He attended Eton College and read Greek and Latin at Christ Church, Oxford University. He was a member of parliament for a total of 20 years, representing Chester for three, Whitby for twelve and East Worcestershire for five.

A singer and organist, he was well versed in musical history, especially the development of Anglican church music. He wrote on musical topics, and one of the views he expressed was that choral church services were to be deplored because "the choirs often discourage the congregations from singing". He wrote the anthems "Gracious and Righteous" and "Withdraw Not Thou", and chants, anthems, introits and organ voluntaries. He composed the hymn tunes Hammersmith, to which "Dear Lord and Father of Mankind" is sometimes set, and Ombersley, sometimes used for "Lord of All Being, Throned Afar".

William played for Scotland in the first unofficial England v Scotland Football International in 1870. He was one of two sitting members of parliament to play for Scotland in this match, the other being John Wingfield Malcolm, MP for Boston.

When his mother's brother Sir Stephen Glynne died without heirs in 1874, the Glynne baronetcy became extinct, but William inherited the Glynne estates, including Hawarden Castle, which had in any case been the Gladstones' family home since his grandfather Sir John Gladstone had used some of his substantial fortune to rescue the Glynne family from bankruptcy in the 1840s. He was appointed High Sheriff of Flintshire for 1888.

He married Gertrude Stuart daughter of Charles Stuart, 12th Lord Blantyre and Lady Evelyn Sutherland-Leveson-Gower who was the daughter of George Sutherland-Leveson-Gower, 2nd Duke of Sutherland.

He died in London on 4 July 1891; his son William Glynne Charles Gladstone inherited Hawarden. His funeral at Hawarden was extremely well attended, and the poor of the parish were said to have "unmistakeably felt that they had lost a most kind and generous benefactor".

Parliament of the United Kingdom
Preceded by Earl Grosvenor and Philip Stapleton Humberston	Member of Parliament for Chester; 1865–1868; With: Earl Grosvenor	Succeeded by Earl Grosvenor and Henry Cecil Raikes
Preceded by Charles Bagnall	Member of Parliament for Whitby; 1868–1880	Succeeded by Arthur Pease
Preceded by Henry Allsopp and Thomas Eades Walker	Member of Parliament for East Worcestershire; 1880–1885; With: George Hastings	Succeeded by George Woodyatt Hastings
