= Herbert Gladstone, 1st Viscount Gladstone =

British politician (1854–1930)

The Right Honourable The Viscount Gladstone GCB GCMG GBE PC JP
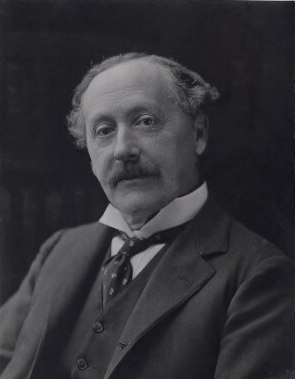
- Gladstone c. 1910

1st Governor-General of South Africa
- In office 31 May 1910 – 8 September 1914
- Monarch: George V
- Prime Minister: Louis Botha
- Preceded by: Sir Walter Hely-Hutchinson (as High Commissioner for Southern Africa)
- Succeeded by: Sydney Buxton

Home Secretary
- In office 11 December 1905 – 14 February 1910
- Prime Minister: Henry Campbell-Bannerman; H. H. Asquith
- Preceded by: Aretas Akers-Douglas
- Succeeded by: Winston Churchill

Opposition Chief Whip in the House of Commons
- In office 15 April 1899 – 10 December 1905
- Leader: Henry Campbell-Bannerman
- Preceded by: T. E. Ellis
- Succeeded by: Alexander Fuller-Acland-Hood

First Commissioner of Works
- In office 10 March 1894 – 21 June 1895
- Prime Minister: Archibald Primrose
- Preceded by: George Shaw Lefevre
- Succeeded by: Aretas Akers-Douglas

Under-Secretary of State for the Home Department
- In office 19 August 1892 – 10 March 1894
- Prime Minister: William Ewart Gladstone
- Preceded by: Charles Stuart-Wortley
- Succeeded by: George W. E. Russell

Financial Secretary to the War Office
- In office 6 February 1886 – 20 July 1886
- Prime Minister: William Ewart Gladstone
- Preceded by: Henry Northcote
- Succeeded by: William Brodrick

Member of Parliament for Leeds West Leeds (1880–1885)
- In office 10 May 1880 – 10 February 1910
- Preceded by: William Ewart Gladstone
- Succeeded by: Edmund Harvey

Personal details
- Born: Herbert John Gladstone; 7 January 1854 Downing Street; Westminster, Middlesex, England, UK
- Died: 6 March 1930 (aged 76) Ware, Hertfordshire, England, UK
- Party: Liberal
- Spouse: Dorothy Mary Paget (m. 1901)
- Parents: William Ewart Gladstone (father); Catherine Glynne (mother)
- Relatives: William Henry Gladstone (brother); Henry Gladstone (brother); Helen Gladstone (sister)
- Education: Eton College
- Alma mater: University College, Oxford

Herbert John Gladstone, 1st Viscount Gladstone (7 January 1854 – 6 March 1930) was a British Liberal politician. The youngest son of William Ewart Gladstone, he was Home Secretary from 1905 to 1910 and Governor-General of the Union of South Africa from 1910 to 1914.

Appointed whip in 1899, Gladstone was an innovator who provided a long-term strategy, kept the party from splitting over the Second Boer War, introduced more modern constituency structures; and encouraged working-class candidates. In secret meetings with Labour leaders in 1903 he forged the Gladstone–MacDonald pact. In two-member constituencies, it arranged that Liberal and Labour candidates did not split the vote. Historians give him much of the credit for the Liberal triumph in 1906, with 397 MPs and a majority of 243.

Rising to Home Secretary in 1906–1908, he was responsible for the Workmen's Compensation Act 1906, a Factory and Workshops Act, and in 1908 the eight hour working day underground in the Coal Mines Regulation Act 1908 (8 Edw. 7. c. 57). Historian John Grigg states that while his name is not often included in any list of radicals, his radical record is second to none in the Campbell-Bannerman Government. He was no firebrand but a good party man whose common sense inclined him to be less Gladstonian in the matter of state intervention then than his famous father had been. With his able under-secretary, Herbert Samuel, he sponsored no less than 34 Acts of Parliament during his time at the Home Office.

== Background and education ==
Gladstone was the youngest son of Prime Minister William Ewart Gladstone and his wife Catherine, daughter of Sir Stephen Glynne, 8th Baronet, and was born in Downing Street where his father was living at the time as Chancellor of the Exchequer. William Henry Gladstone and Lord Gladstone of Hawarden were his elder brothers. He was educated at Eton and University College, Oxford, and lectured in history at Keble College, Oxford, for three years.

== Political career ==
Gladstone circa 1895

In 1880 Gladstone became private secretary to his father. That same year, having unsuccessfully contested the Middlesex constituency, he was elected Liberal Member of Parliament for Leeds.

The Hawarden Kite was a famous newspaper scoop of December 1885, an instance of flying a kite, made by Gladstone, who often served as his father's secretary. At the time William Ewart Gladstone was Leader of the Liberal Opposition. Herbert gave the report to Edmund Rogers of the National Press Agency in London. The key statement was that his father now supported home rule for Ireland. The statement is accurate but it is unknown whether the father knew and approved of releasing it to the press. The bombshell announcement resulted in the fall of Lord Salisbury's Conservative government. Irish Nationalists, led by Charles Stewart Parnell's Irish Parliamentary Party, held the balance of power in Parliament. Gladstone's conversion to Home Rule convinced them to switch away from the Conservatives and support the Liberals using the 86 seats in Parliament they controlled.

In the 1885 General Election Gladstone was returned to Parliament for Leeds West. Having been a junior Lord of the Treasury from 1881 to 1885, Gladstone became Deputy Commissioner of the Office of Works in 1885. The following year served for a brief period as Financial Secretary to the War Office in his father's third administration. In 1892, on his father's return to power, he was made Under-Secretary of State for the Home Department, and two years later he became First Commissioner of Works in Lord Rosebery's government, at which time he was also sworn of the Privy Council. In 1895 he gave the first contract to Mary Howard Ashworth to create the first typing facility in the Houses of Parliament just before the Liberals fell from power. He became the Liberals' Chief Whip in 1899, and in 1903 he negotiated on behalf of the Liberals an electoral pact with the Labour Representation Committee. He was president of the Darlington Liberal and Radical Association from early 1900.

Gladstone returned to office in 1905 when Sir Henry Campbell-Bannerman appointed him Home Secretary. According to historian Professor Ian Machin, Gladstone was not among "the foremost New Liberals such as Lloyd George and Churchill,” but was nevertheless a believer (as noted by one observer) in positive government, and played a large part in carrying a number of the Liberal welfare reforms during his time in office, including the Workmen's Compensation Act 1906, the Children Act 1908 (8 Edw. 7. c. 67), and the Trade Boards Act 1909.

As Prince of Wales, King Edward VII had come to enjoy warm and mutually respectful relations with W. E. Gladstone, whom Queen Victoria detested. These feelings did not extend to his son. In September 1908 Herbert permitted Roman Catholic priests in vestments, led by Cardinal Vincenzo Vannutelli, to carry the Host in a procession through the streets of London. There were a flood of protests, and the King asked Gladstone to ban the procession to avert a breach of the peace. The Home Secretary was on holiday in Scotland at the time, and did not reply, giving rise to false rumours that the King – who was known to take an interest in Roman Catholic rituals when abroad – favoured the procession. In the end the Prime Minister H. H. Asquith had to ask Lord Ripon, the only Catholic Cabinet Minister, to ask for the Host and vestments to be cancelled.

The following year the King rebuked Gladstone for appointing two women, Lady Frances Balfour and May Tennant, to serve on a Royal commission on reforming Divorce Law – the King thought divorce could not be discussed with "delicacy or even decency" before ladies. Philip Magnus suggests that Gladstone may have become a whipping-boy for the King's general irritation with the Liberal Government.

Gladstone was sacked in the reshuffle in 1910 and the King agreed, with some reluctance, to appoint him the first Governor-General of the Union of South Africa as well as the High Commissioner for Southern Africa. He was appointed a Knight Commander of the Order of St Michael and St George and raised to the peerage as Viscount Gladstone, of the County of Lanark, the same year.

== Later life ==
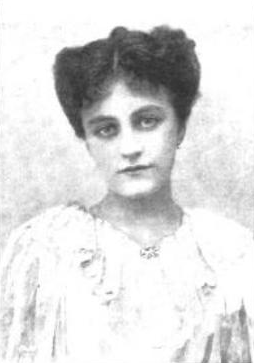
Dorothy Mary Paget in 1901

After his return from South Africa in 1914, Lord Gladstone was appointed a Knight Grand Cross of the Order of the Bath (GCB), and spent much of the First World War being involved with various charities and charitable organisations, including the War Refugees Committee, the South African Hospital Fund, and the South African Ambulance in France. He was appointed a Knight Grand Cross of the Order of the British Empire (GBE) in 1917.

== Family ==
In 1901 Lord Gladstone married Dorothy Mary, daughter of Sir Richard Paget, 1st Baronet, who was over twenty years his junior. He died in March 1930, aged 76, at his Dane End, Hertfordshire home, and had funeral service in the village's Little Munden Church but is buried in the Family plot at St Deiniol's Church in Hawarden. There were no children from the marriage, and therefore his title became extinct at his death. Viscountess Gladstone died in June 1953.

== Works ==
- After Thirty Years (1928)

Parliament of the United Kingdom
Preceded by William Ewart Gladstone; John Barran; William Jackson	Member of Parliament for Leeds; 1880 – 1885; With: John Barran and William Jackson	Constituency abolished
New constituency	Member of Parliament for Leeds West; 1885 – Jan. 1910	Succeeded by Thomas Harvey
Political offices
Preceded by Henry Northcote	Financial Secretary to the War Office; 1886	Succeeded by Hon. St John Brodrick
Preceded by Charles Stuart-Wortley	Under-Secretary of State for the Home Department; 1892–1894	Succeeded by George W. E. Russell
Preceded by George Shaw-Lefevre	First Commissioner of Works; 1894–1895	Succeeded by Aretas Akers-Douglas
Preceded by Aretas Akers-Douglas	Home Secretary; 1905–1910	Succeeded by Winston Churchill
Party political offices
Preceded by T. E. Ellis	Liberal Chief Whip; 1899–1905	Succeeded by George Whiteley
Government offices
New office	Governor-General of the Union of South Africa; 1910–1914	Succeeded by The Viscount Buxton
Peerage of the United Kingdom
New creation	Viscount Gladstone; 1910–1930	Extinct
