= Aaron Chapman (politician) =

English writer and politician

- Born: 13 September 1771
- Died: 28 December 1850 (aged 79); Highbury Park, London, England
- Burial place: Hornsey, Middlesex (now north London)
- Occupations: Writer and politician
- Years active: 1832–1847 (MP)
- Known for: MP, Whitby
- Political party: Conservative
- Spouse: Elizabeth (née Barker) (m. 1796)
- Children: 4 sons, 2 daughters

Aaron Chapman (13 September 1771 – 28 December 1850) was an English writer and politician. He was the inaugural member of Parliament for Whitby, representing the Conservative Party.

Chapman was elected as the member of Parliament for Whitby for four successive parliaments. He later served as a magistrate in Middlesex and as an Elder Brother of Trinity House, the maritime charity. He also served as a trustee of Ramsgate Harbour and as a director of the Hudson's Bay Company.

In 1825, he was a director of the New Zealand Company, a venture chaired by the wealthy John George Lambton, a Whig MP (and later 1st Earl of Durham), which made the first attempt to colonise New Zealand.

He married Elizabeth (née Barker) on 2 June 1796. The couple had four sons and two daughters. Their third son, Edward, served as a director of the Bank of England.

Chapman died at his home in Highbury Park, London, and was interred in Hornsey, Middlesex (now north London).

Parliament of the United Kingdom
Preceded by New creation	Member of Parliament for Whitby; 1832–1847	Succeeded by Robert Stephenson
