= Soame Jenyns (art historian) =

British art historian

Roger Soame Jenyns (24 April 1904 – 14 October 1976), who usually wrote his name simply as Soame Jenyns was a British art historian, known as an expert on East Asian ceramics.

The eldest son of Roger William Bulwer Jenyns (1858 – 1936), J.P., of Bottisham Hall, Bottisham, Cambridgeshire, by his wife Winifred Pike, daughter of Arthur Pease, M.P., of Hummersknott, Darlington, Roger Soame Jenyns was educated at Eton and at Magdalene College, Cambridge (B.A. 1926). In 1926 he joined the Hong Kong Civil Service. In Hong Kong, he became one of the valuable contributors to the newly established journal, The Hong Kong Naturalist. His articles would often touch on the cultural role of South China's animals and plants.

In 1931, Jenyns left Hong Kong for England, to take up a job at the British Museum, where he served as the Assistant Keeper of Oriental Antiquities until 1967. In 1935 he published a well-received book on Chinese painting; later on, he authored several books on Chinese ceramics and jades in which he described many items from the museum's collection.

In 1936, Roger Soame Jenyns inherited the Bottisham Hall estate from his father. Two centuries earlier this had been owned by the writer and politician Soame Jenyns, on whose death it was inherited by his first cousin twice removed, Canon George Leonard Jenyns, great-great-grandfather of Roger Soame Jenyns.

== Family ==
On 24 April 1941, Soame Jenyns married Anne Thomson, dau. of Richard Berridge, D.L., J.P., of Screebe, County Galway. They had two sons.

== Books by Soame Jenyns ==
- A Background to Chinese Painting by Soame Jenyns: with a Preface for Collectors by W. W. Winkworth; London, Sidgwick & Jackson, Ltd., 1935.
- Jenyns, Soame (1951), British Museum. Dept. of Oriental Antiquities and of Ethnography (ed.), Chinese archaic jades in the British Museum, Trustees of the British Museum
- Jenyns, Soame (1953), Ming pottery and porcelain, The Faber monographs on pottery and porcelain, Faber and Faber
- Later Chinese Porcelain: The Ch’ing Dynasty (1644-1912) (London, 1954).; later edition: Jenyns, Soame (1965), Later Chinese porcelain: the Ch'ing dynasty (1644-1912), Faber monographs on pottery and porcelain (3 ed.), Faber and Faber
- Jourdain, Margaret; Jenyns, Soame (1967), Chinese export art in the eighteenth century (2 ed.), Spring Books (First edition appeared in 1950)
- Jenyns, Soame; Watson, William (1963), Chinese art; the minor arts: gold, silver, bronze, cloisonné, Cantonese enamel, lacquer, furniture, wood. Volume 1., Volume 2 of The Universe library of antique art. Chinese Art, Universe Books
- Jenyns, Soame; Watson, William (1965), Chinese art: the minor arts II : textiles, glass and painting on glass, carvings in ivory and rhinoceros horn, carvings in hardstones, snuff bottles, inkcakes and inkstones., Volume 4, Universe library of Antique art, Universe Books
