= Noel Buxton =

British politician

The Right Honourable The Lord Noel-Buxton PC
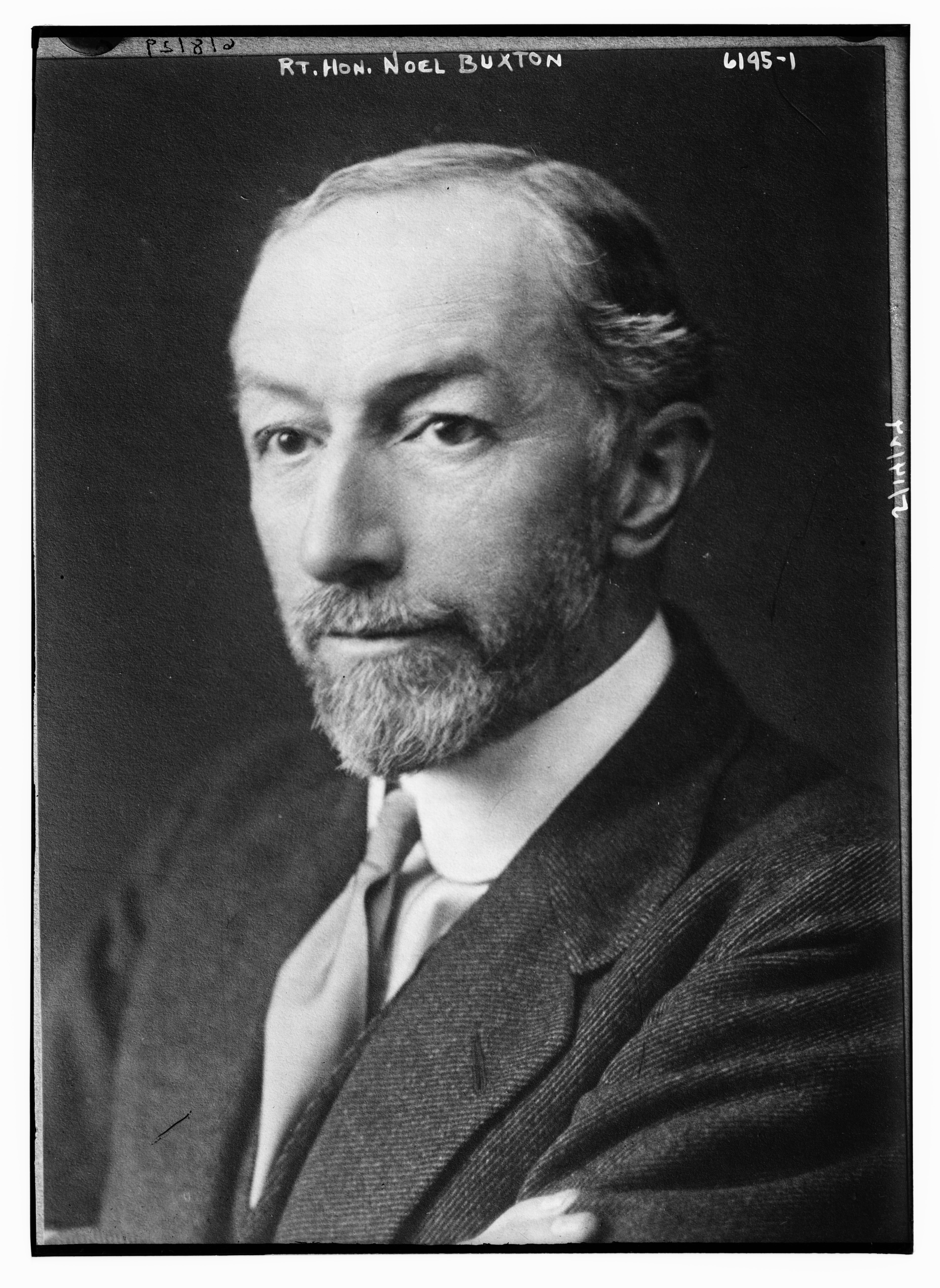

Minister of Agriculture and Fisheries
- In office 22 January 1924 – 3 November 1924
- Monarch: George V
- Prime Minister: Ramsay MacDonald
- Preceded by: Sir Robert Sanders
- Succeeded by: E. F. L. Wood
- In office 7 June 1929 – 5 June 1930
- Monarch: George V
- Prime Minister: Ramsay MacDonald
- Preceded by: Walter Guinness
- Succeeded by: Christopher Addison

Personal details
- Born: Noel Edward Buxton; 9 January 1869
- Died: 12 September 1948 (aged 79)
- Party: Liberal; Labour
- Spouse: Lucy Pelham Burn (m. 1914)
- Children: 6
- Education: Trinity College, Cambridge

Noel Edward Noel-Buxton, 1st Baron Noel-Buxton, PC (9 January 1869 – 12 September 1948), was a British Liberal and later Labour politician. He served as Minister of Agriculture and Fisheries under Ramsay MacDonald in 1924 and between 1929 and 1930.

== Background and education ==
Born Noel Edward Buxton, the second son of Sir Thomas Buxton, 3rd Baronet and brother of Charles Roden Buxton, he was educated at Harrow and at Trinity College, Cambridge.

== Political career ==
In 1896, Buxton acted as Aide-de-Camp to his father during his time as Governor of South Australia. He served on the Whitechapel Board of Guardians and Central Unemployment Body, and was a Member of the Home Office Departmental Committee on Lead Poisoning.

Buxton stood unsuccessfully for Ipswich in 1900. He was elected as Liberal Member of Parliament for Whitby in 1905, a seat he held until 1906. He was out of parliament until the January 1910 general election, when he was returned for Norfolk North. He joined the Labour Party in 1919 and in 1922 he successfully contested his Norfolk North seat as a Labour candidate. He continued to represent the constituency until 1930.

When Labour came to power under Ramsay MacDonald in January 1924, Buxton was appointed Minister of Agriculture and Fisheries, with a seat in the cabinet, and sworn of the Privy Council. He remained as Minister of Agriculture and Fisheries until the government fell in December 1924. He resumed the post in 1929 (once again as a member of the cabinet) when Labour returned to office under MacDonald, and held it until 1930, when he was raised to the peerage as Baron Noel-Buxton, of Aylsham in the County of Norfolk. He changed his surname at this point to 'Noel-Buxton', so enabling that to be his title.

According to one observer, Buxton was “the first Minister of Agriculture to put agricultural co-operation in the forefront of his programme and to appoint marketing officers.”

== Balkans ==
The Balkans became a very important part of Buxton's career. In 1912, as Buxton had been warning, war broke out between the newly independent Balkan countries of Bulgaria, Greece, Montenegro and Serbia and the Ottoman Empire. Buxton was Chairman of the Balkan War Relief Committee. Shortly after the war had broken out, he visited Bulgaria with Mabel St Clair Stobart, founder of the Women's Sick and Wounded Convoy Corps. He helped her convince the government to agree to send an all-female medical unit to the war.

During the First World War (1914–1915), he went on a political mission with his brother Charles with the object of securing the neutrality of Bulgaria. While in Bucharest, Romania in October 1914, an assassination attempt was made on them, by Turkish activist, Hasan Tahsin. Buxton was wounded and his brother was shot through the lung. They both recovered and continued to have an interest in the region.

After their return, they published a book describing the region and its recent history, The War and the Balkans (London: George Allen and Unwin, 1915). It begins with these words:

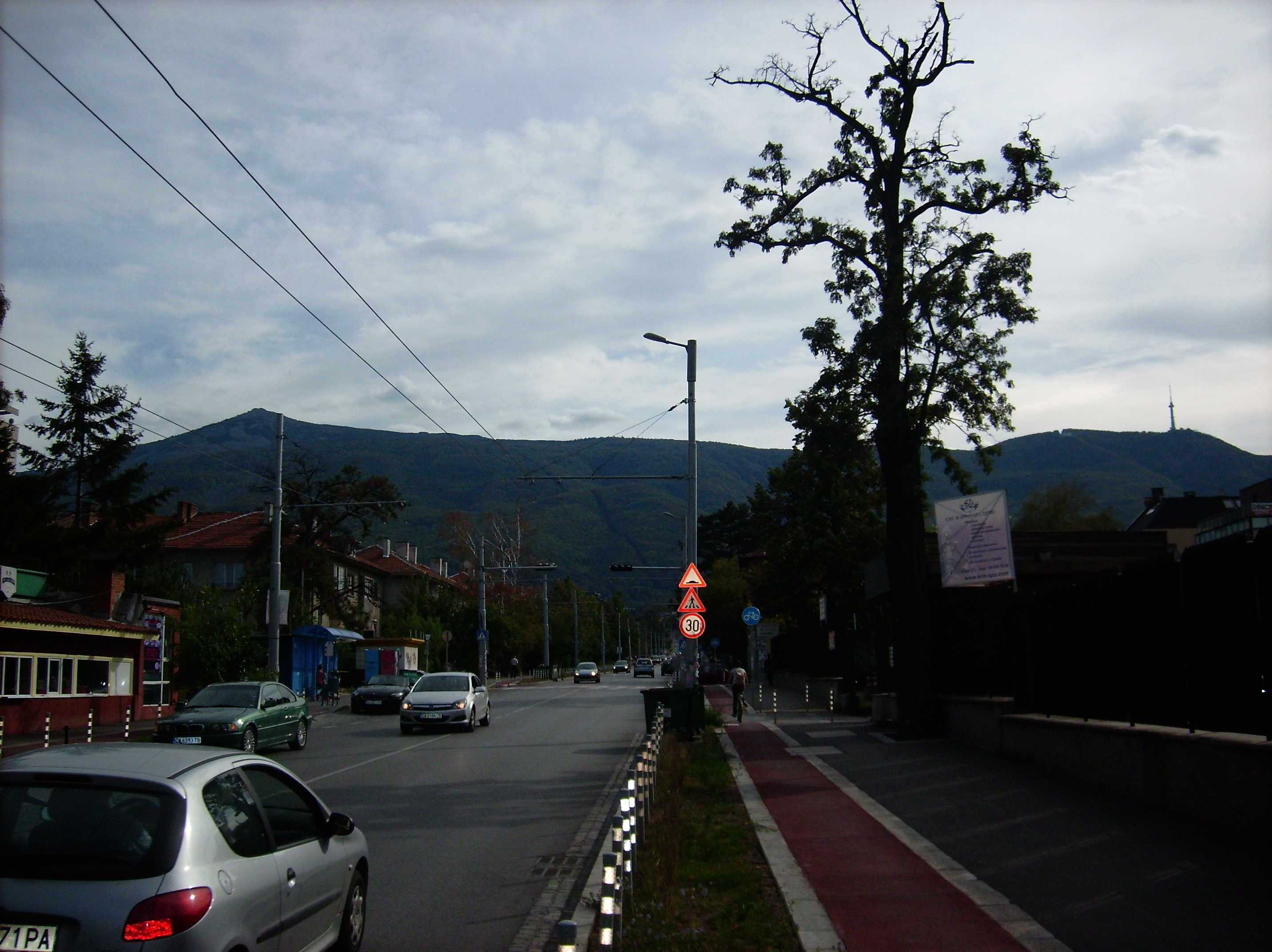
A view of Vitosha from the boulevard named after the brothers Noel & Charles Buxton in Sofia, Bulgaria (42°39.943′N 23°16.521′E)

No one now denies the supreme importance of the Balkans as a factor in the European War. It may be that there were deep-seated hostilities between the Great Powers which would have, in any case, produced a European War and that if the Balkans had not offered the occasion, the occasion would have been found elsewhere. The fact remains that the Balkans did provide the occasion. A great part of the Serbo-Croat race found itself under the Austrian Empire, and with its increasing consciousness of nationality became more and more dissatisfied with its lot. The independent kingdom of Serbia for its part has taken active steps to spread abroad the idea of uniting its brothers under its own flag. It was Austria's ambition to crush this dangerous little State, the one rallying point of a vigorous and determined race.

Buxton's publications include: Europe and the Turks (1907), With the Bulgarian Staff (1913), Travels and Reflections (1929); and he was part-author of The Heart of the Empire (1902), Travel and Politics in Armenia (1914), The War and the Balkans (1915), Balkan Problems and European Peace (1919), and Oppressed Peoples and the League of Nations (1922).

== Family ==
Noel was the great-grandson of the abolitionist, Sir Thomas Fowell Buxton he married Lucy Edith Pelham Burn in 1914. She succeeded him as Member of Parliament for Norfolk North in 1930. The couple had three sons and three daughters. Noel-Buxton died in September 1948, aged 79, and was succeeded in the barony by his eldest son, Rufus Alexander(1917–1980). Lady Noel-Buxton died in December 1960.

== Noel Buxton Trust ==
Inspired by the abolitionism of his great-grandfather, he established the Noel Buxton Trust in 1919. This had a commitment to "a worldwide view of human welfare". The initial grant was made to the Fight the Famine Council, led by Eglantyne Jebb and his sister-in-law, Dorothy Buxton, which later became the Save the Children Fund. The charity funded the Family Rights Group, the Community Chaplaincy Association (working with ex-prisoners), and Excellent, a charity supporting sustainable development with subsistence communities in Africa.

Parliament of the United Kingdom
Preceded by Ernest Beckett	Member of Parliament for Whitby; 1905–1906	Succeeded by Gervase Beckett
Preceded by Sir William Brampton Gurdon	Member of Parliament for North Norfolk; January 1910–1918	Succeeded by Douglas King
Preceded by Douglas King	Member of Parliament for North Norfolk; 1922–1930	Succeeded by The Baroness Noel-Buxton
Political offices
Preceded by Sir Robert Sanders, Bt	Minister of Agriculture and Fisheries; 1924	Succeeded by Hon. E. F. L. Wood
Preceded by Hon. Walter Guinness	Minister of Agriculture and Fisheries; 1929–30	Succeeded by Christopher Addison
Peerage of the United Kingdom
New creation	Baron Noel-Buxton; 1930–1948	Succeeded by Rufus Alexander Buxton
