= Whitby (constituency) =

Parliamentary constituency in Whitby, North Yorkshire, England

- Former borough constituency for the House of Commons
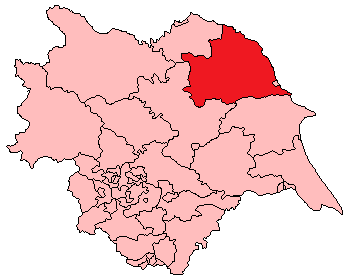
- Whitby in Yorkshire, 1885-1918

1832–1885
- Seats: One
- Created from: Yorkshire
- Replaced by: Whitby

1885–1918
- Seats: One
- Type of constituency: County constituency
- Created from: North Riding of Yorkshire and Whitby
- Replaced by: Scarborough and Whitby and Thirsk and Malton

Whitby was a parliamentary constituency centred on the town of Whitby in North Yorkshire. It returned one Member of Parliament (MP) to the House of Commons of the Parliament of the United Kingdom, elected by the first past the post system.

== History ==
The constituency was created by the Great Reform Act for the 1832 general election as a parliamentary borough, Whitby being at that point one of the most prosperous towns in England which had not previously been represented. (Whitby had been summoned to send members to the Protectorate Parliaments during the Civil War period, but never at any other time.) It consisted of Whitby itself and the adjoining townships of Ruswarp, Hawsker and Stainsacre, and had a population of just over 10,000.

Whitby's shipbuilding industry had been in decline even before the new borough was established, and by 1885 a separate MP for the town could no longer be justified. However, when the borough was abolished the county constituency which absorbed it was also named Whitby (strictly, the Whitby Division of the North Riding of Yorkshire): it contained all the easternmost part of the Riding apart from Scarborough (which remained a separate borough), stretching south-west to Pickering which was the only other town in the constituency.

The Whitby division was abolished for the 1918 general election, when it was partially replaced by the new Scarborough & Whitby constituency.

== Members of Parliament ==
Election	Member	Party
1832	Aaron Chapman	Tory
1834	Aaron Chapman	Conservative
1847	Robert Stephenson	Conservative
1859 by-election	Harry Thompson	Liberal
1865	Charles Bagnall	Conservative
1868	William Henry Gladstone	Liberal
1880	Arthur Pease	Liberal
1885	Ernest Beckett	Conservative
1905 by-election	Noel Buxton	Liberal
1906	Gervase Beckett	Conservative
1918	constituency abolished: see Scarborough and Whitby	

== Election results ==
=== Elections in the 1830s ===
General election 1832: Whitby
Party	Candidate	Votes	%
Tory	Aaron Chapman	217	61.0
Whig	Richard Moorson	139	39.0
Majority		78	22.0
Turnout		356	84.4
Registered electors		422	
Tory win (new seat)			

General election 1835: Whitby
Party	Candidate	Votes	%	±%
Conservative	Aaron Chapman	Unopposed		
Registered electors		432		
Conservative hold				

General election 1837: Whitby
Party	Candidate	Votes	%	±%
Conservative	Aaron Chapman	Unopposed		
Registered electors		458		
Conservative hold				

=== Elections in the 1840s ===
General election 1841: Whitby
Party	Candidate	Votes	%	±%
Conservative	Aaron Chapman	Unopposed		
Registered electors		424		
Conservative hold				

General election 1847: Whitby
Party	Candidate	Votes	%	±%
Conservative	Robert Stephenson	Unopposed		
Registered electors		403		
Conservative hold				

=== Elections in the 1850s ===
General election 1852: Whitby
Party	Candidate	Votes	%	±%
Conservative	Robert Stephenson	218	66.7	N/A
Whig	Edmund Phipps	109	33.3	New
Majority		109	33.4	N/A
Turnout		327	72.0	N/A
Registered electors		454		
Conservative hold		Swing	N/A	

General election 1857: Whitby
Party	Candidate	Votes	%	±%
Conservative	Robert Stephenson	Unopposed		
Registered electors		532		
Conservative hold				

General election 1859: Whitby
Party	Candidate	Votes	%	±%
Conservative	Robert Stephenson	Unopposed		
Registered electors		647		
Conservative hold				

Stephenson's death caused a by-election.

By-election, 23 November 1859: Whitby
Party	Candidate	Votes	%	±%
Liberal	Harry Thompson	229	54.7	New
Conservative	Thomas Chapman	190	45.3	N/A
Majority		39	9.4	N/A
Turnout		419	64.8	N/A
Registered electors		647		
Liberal gain from Conservative		Swing	N/A	

=== Elections in the 1860s ===
General election 1865: Whitby
Party	Candidate	Votes	%	±%
Conservative	Charles Bagnall	305	52.0	N/A
Liberal	Harry Thompson	282	48.0	N/A
Majority		23	4.0	N/A
Turnout		587	83.5	N/A
Registered electors		703		
Conservative hold		Swing	N/A	

General election 1868: Whitby
Party	Candidate	Votes	%	±%
Liberal	William Henry Gladstone	894	63.3	+15.3
Conservative	Sir William Cayley Worsley, 2nd Baronet	518	36.7	−15.3
Majority		376	26.6	N/A
Turnout		1,412	68.6	−14.9
Registered electors		2,058		
Liberal gain from Conservative		Swing	+15.3	

Gladstone was appointed a Lord Commissioner of the Treasury, requiring a by-election.

By-election, 18 November 1869: Whitby
Party	Candidate	Votes	%	±%
Liberal	William Henry Gladstone	779	56.7	−6.6
Conservative	Sir William Cayley Worsley, 2nd Baronet	596	43.3	+6.6
Majority		183	13.4	−13.2
Turnout		1,375	66.8	−1.8
Registered electors		2,058		
Liberal hold		Swing	−6.6	

=== Elections in the 1870s ===
General election 1874: Whitby
Party	Candidate	Votes	%	±%
Liberal	William Henry Gladstone	873	53.7	−9.6
Conservative	Charles Bagnall	754	46.3	+9.6
Majority		119	7.4	−19.2
Turnout		1,627	78.6	+10.0
Registered electors		2,069		
Liberal hold		Swing	−9.6	

=== Elections in the 1880s ===
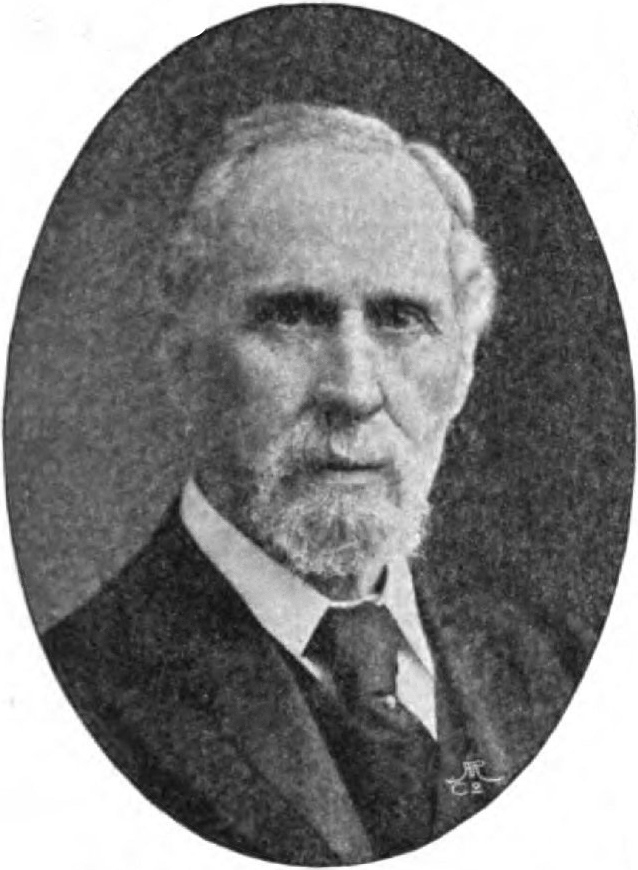
Pease

General election 1880: Whitby
Party	Candidate	Votes	%	±%
Liberal	Arthur Pease	1,072	60.5	+6.8
Conservative	Robert Mowbray	699	39.5	−6.8
Majority		373	21.0	+13.6
Turnout		1,771	81.9	+3.3
Registered electors		2,163		
Liberal hold		Swing	+6.8	

At the 1885 election the constituency was redrawn to include Pickering and the hinterlands of Scarborough.

General election 1885: Whitby
Party	Candidate	Votes	%	±%
Conservative	Ernest Beckett-Denison	5,049	51.7	+12.2
Liberal	Arthur Pease	4,709	48.3	−12.2
Majority		340	3.4	N/A
Turnout		9,758	86.0	+4.1
Registered electors		11,350		
Conservative gain from Liberal		Swing	+12.2	

General election 1886: Whitby
Party	Candidate	Votes	%	±%
Conservative	Ernest Beckett	5,078	56.3	+4.6
Liberal	James Menzies Clayhills	3,940	43.7	−4.6
Majority		1,138	12.6	+9.2
Turnout		9,018	79.5	−6.5
Registered electors		11,350		
Conservative hold		Swing	+4.6	

=== Elections in the 1890s ===
General election 1892: Whitby
Party	Candidate	Votes	%	±%
Conservative	Ernest Beckett	4,909	56.2	−0.1
Liberal	H Frank Pyman	3,826	43.8	+0.1
Majority		1,083	12.4	−0.2
Turnout		8,735	80.8	+1.3
Registered electors		10,804		
Conservative hold		Swing	−0.1	

General election 1895: Whitby
Party	Candidate	Votes	%	±%
Conservative	Ernest Beckett	Unopposed		
Conservative hold				

=== Elections in the 1900s ===
General election 1900: Whitby
Party	Candidate	Votes	%	±%
Conservative	Ernest Beckett	Unopposed		
Conservative hold				

Buxton

1905 Whitby by-election
Party	Candidate	Votes	%	±%
Liberal	Noel Buxton	4,547	52.6	New
Conservative	Gervase Beckett	4,102	47.4	N/A
Majority		445	5.2	N/A
Turnout		8,649	79.7	N/A
Registered electors		10,857		
Liberal gain from Conservative		Swing	N/A	

Beckett

General election 1906: Whitby
Party	Candidate	Votes	%	±%
Conservative	Gervase Beckett	4,780	50.4	N/A
Liberal	Noel Buxton	4,709	49.6	N/A
Majority		71	0.8	N/A
Turnout		9,489	84.2	N/A
Registered electors		11,263		
Conservative hold		Swing	N/A	

=== Elections in the 1910s ===
Jardine

General election January 1910: Whitby
Party	Candidate	Votes	%	±%
Conservative	Gervase Beckett	5,161	52.9	+2.5
Liberal	James Jardine	4,602	47.1	−2.5
Majority		559	5.8	+5.0
Turnout		9,763	87.2	+3.0
Registered electors		11,200		
Conservative hold		Swing	+2.5	

General election December 1910: Whitby
Party	Candidate	Votes	%	±%
Conservative	Gervase Beckett	4,960	52.4	−0.5
Liberal	Walter Herbert Septimus Pyman	4,508	47.6	+0.5
Majority		452	4.8	−1.0
Turnout		9,468	84.5	−2.7
Registered electors		11,200		
Conservative hold		Swing	−0.5	

General Election 1914–15:

Another General Election was required to take place before the end of 1915. The political parties had been making preparations for an election to take place and by July 1914, the following candidates had been selected;

- Unionist: Gervase Beckett
- Liberal:
