= Rafe Grenville Rowley-Conwy =

British Naval officer (1875–1951)

Rear-Admiral Rafe Grenville Rowley-Conwy CMG
- Born: 11 September 1875
- Died: 4 April 1951 (aged 75)
- Children: 0
- Parents: Capt. Conwy Grenville Hercules Rowley (father); Marian Harford (mother)
- Military career
- Allegiance: United Kingdom
- Branch: Royal Navy
- Service years: 1894-192?
- Rank: Rear-Admiral
- Commands: HMS Mentor (1914); 15th Destroyer Flotilla (1917–19); 3rd Destroyer Flotilla (1919–21); HMS Curacoa (1921–??)

Lord Lieutenant of Flintshire
- In office 1935–1951
- Preceded by: Henry Gladstone, 1st Baron Gladstone of Hawarden
- Succeeded by: Hugh Salusbury Kynaston Mainwaring

Rear-Admiral Rafe Grenville Rowley-Conwy, CMG (11 September 1875 – 4 April 1951), was a Royal Navy officer and Lord Lieutenant of Flintshire.

== Biography ==
=== Personal life ===
Rowley-Conwy was the second son of Captain Conwy Granville Hercules Rowley (1841–1900), by his wife Marian Harford. His father, who later took the surname Rowley-Conwy, was a son of Colonel the Hon. Richard Rowley (1812–1887), an MP for Harwich and a younger son of the 1st Baron Langford. He attended the Arnold House preparatory school in the village of Llanddulas, north Wales.

He owned the Bodrhyddan estate in Rhuddlan. He never married, and the estate was inherited by his nephew Geoffrey Alexander Rowley-Conwy, who later succeeded a second cousin as Baron Langford.

=== Military career ===
Rowley-Conwy was confirmed as a second lieutenant in the Royal Navy on 14 December 1894, and later promoted to Lieutenant. On 13 May 1902 he was appointed to the cruiser HMS Medusa, as First and Gunnery lieutenant. He was promoted to Commander on 22 July 1911, and to Captain on 31 December 1916. In November 1914 he was appointed in command of the destroyer HMS Mentor. He was in command of the 15th Destroyer Flotilla from November 1917 to 1 March 1919. Appointed Captain (D), 3rd Destroyer Flotilla from 7 July 1919 to 7 July 1921. During the latter part of the First World War, and was appointed captain of the light cruiser HMS Curacoa in 1921. He retired as Rear-Admiral.

=== Later life ===
Rowley-Conwy was High Sheriff of Flintshire in 1929, and was appointed Lord Lieutenant of Flintshire on 3 July 1935, serving as such until his death in April 1951.

Honorary titles
Preceded by Henry Gladstone, Baron Gladstone of Hawarden	Lord Lieutenant of Flintshire; 1935–1951	Succeeded by Hugh Salusbury Kynaston Mainwaring
