= Henry Gladstone, 1st Baron Gladstone of Hawarden =

British businessman and politician (1852–1935)

The Right Honourable The Lord Gladstone of Hawarden
- Lord Gladstone in 1932
- Born: Henry Neville Gladstone; 2 April 1852; Hawarden, Flintshire, Wales
- Died: 28 April 1935 (aged 83)
- Education: Eton College; King's College London
- Spouse: Hon. Maud Ernestine Rendel (m. 1890–1935)
- Parents: William Ewart Gladstone (father); Catherine Glynne (mother)
- Relatives: William Gladstone (brother); Herbert Gladstone (brother); Helen Gladstone (sister); Stuart Rendel (father-in-law)

Lord Lieutenant of Flintshire
- In office 1915–1935
- Preceded by: Will Gladstone
- Succeeded by: Rafe Grenville Rowley-Conwy

Henry Neville Gladstone, 1st Baron Gladstone of Hawarden (2 April 1852 – 28 April 1935) was a British businessman and politician. He was the third son of Prime Minister William Ewart Gladstone.

== Background and education ==
Gladstone was the third son and seventh child of Liberal statesman and four times Prime Minister of the United Kingdom, William Ewart Gladstone, and his wife Catherine Glynne. He was the brother of William Henry Gladstone and Herbert Gladstone, 1st Viscount Gladstone. He was educated at the Revd William Montagu Higginson's church preparatory school in Norfolk, and then at Eton College, and at King's College London.

== Career ==
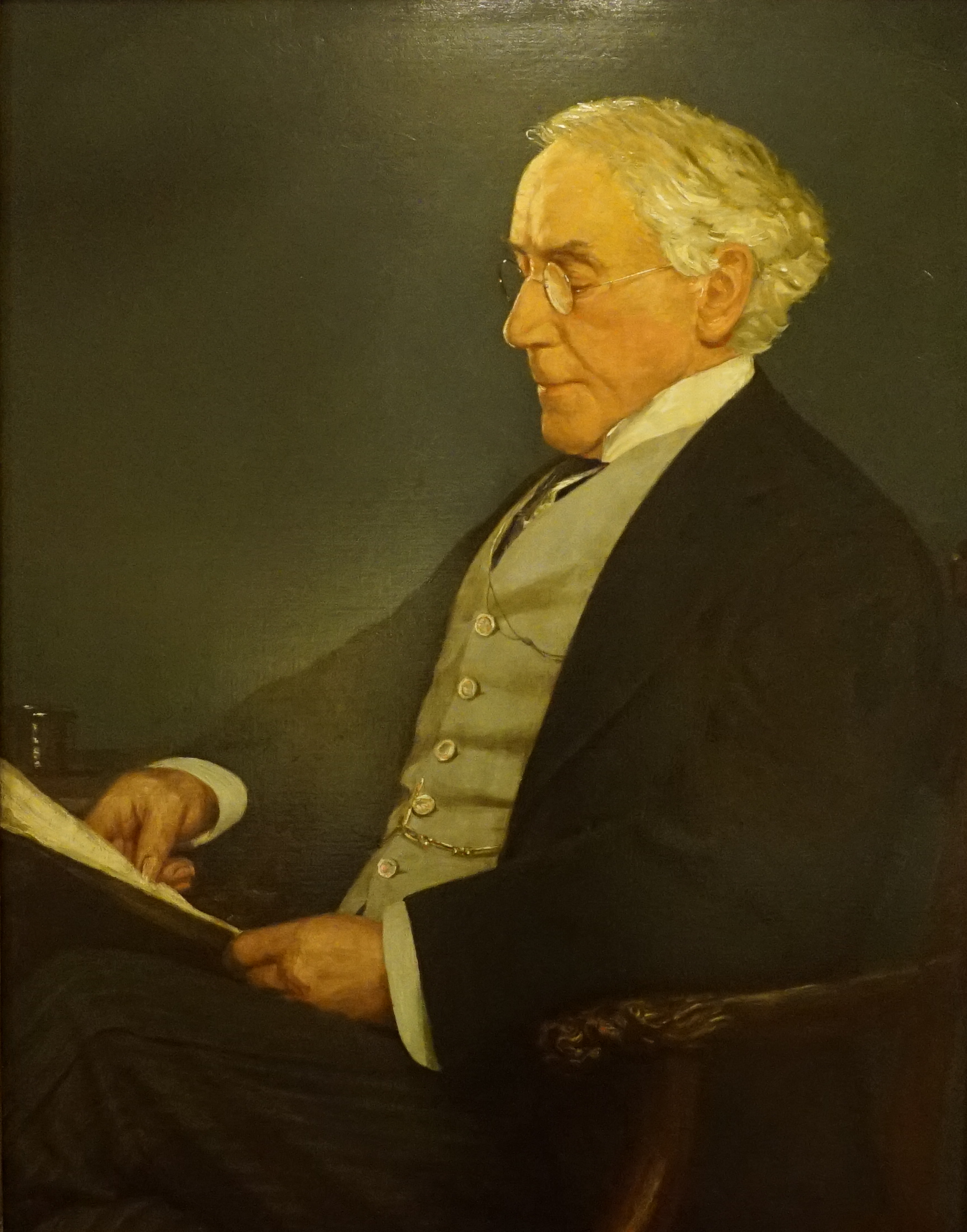
National Liberal Club Portrait of Lord Gladstone of Harwarden

In 1871 Gladstone entered the London office of Gladstone, Wylie & Co., the firm founded by his paternal grandfather, Sir John Gladstone. He was with Gillanders, Arbuthnot and Company, another family firm, between 1874 and 1888 in India. In 1881 he was made a junior partner in the firm, and 1883 his father gave him £4000 with which to buy a senior partnership. He was private secretary to the prime minister, his father. He was a director of P&O, and of the B.I. Steamship Company. He was an Alderman on Flint County Council in 1916.

Gladstone became Lord of the manor of the family estates at Hawarden, when its previous owner, his nephew, William Glynne Charles Gladstone, was killed in action in April 1915. Gladstone purchased the succession to the estate, paid off the outstanding mortgage and improved the house, which from 1921 was his home for the rest of his life. He succeeded his late nephew as Lord Lieutenant of Flintshire, and was President of the University College of North Wales at Bangor. He was a Justice of the Peace (JP) for both Flintshire and Cheshire. He was awarded the honorary degree of LL.D., and was raised to the peerage as Baron Gladstone of Hawarden, of Hawarden in the County of Flint, on 22 June 1932. He was the Constable of Flint Castle in 1934.

== Personal life ==
Lord Gladstone of Hawarden married the Hon. Maud Ernestine Rendel, daughter of Stuart Rendel, 1st Baron Rendel and Ellen Sophy Hubbard, on 30 January 1890 at St George's, Hanover Square in London. There were no children from the marriage. He died in April 1935, aged 83, when the barony became extinct.

Party political offices
Preceded by Ellis William Davies	President of the Welsh Liberal Federation; 1922–1925	Succeeded by David Lloyd George
Honorary titles
Preceded by Will Gladstone	Lord Lieutenant of Flintshire; 1915–1935	Succeeded by Rafe Grenville Rowley-Conwy
Peerage of the United Kingdom
New creation	Baron Gladstone of Hawarden; 1932–1935	Extinct
