= Arthur Pease (politician) =

British politician (1837-1898)

Arthur Pease DL
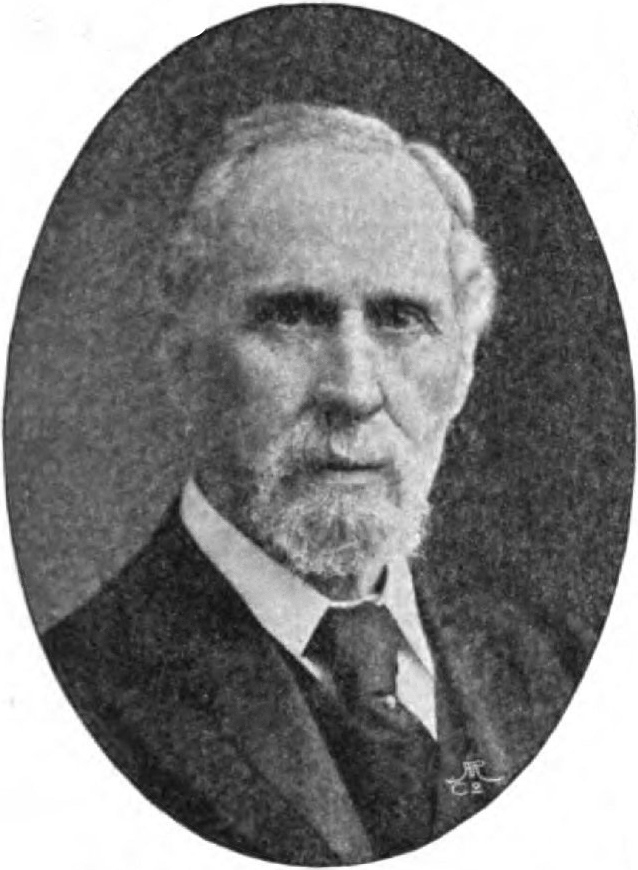

Member of Parliament for Whitby
- In office 1880–1885
- Preceded by: William Henry Gladstone
- Succeeded by: Ernest Beckett

Member of Parliament for Darlington
- In office 1895–1898
- Preceded by: Theodore Fry
- Succeeded by: Herbert Pike Pease

Personal details
- Born: 12 September 1837
- Died: 27 August 1898 (aged 60)
- Party: Liberal
- Spouse: Mary Lecky Pike (m. 1864)
- Parents: Joseph Pease (father); Emma Gurney (1800-1860) (mother)
- Relatives: Sir Arthur Pease (son); Herbert Pease (son); Winifred Pike Pease (daughter); Soame Jenyns (grandson); Edward Pease (paternal grandfather)

Arthur Pease, DL (12 September 1837 – 27 August 1898) was a British politician. He was the son of Joseph Pease.

== Biography ==
He was a Liberal Member of Parliament for Whitby from 1880 to 1885, and a Liberal Unionist MP for Darlington from 1895 until his death in 1898, aged 60.

He was a member of the Royal Commission on Opium in India from 1893 to 1895.

He married on 14 April 1864 to Mary Lecky Pike. They had two sons, Sir Arthur Pease (1866–1927), Herbert Pease (1867–1949), and one daughter named Winifred Pike Pease, who married in 1903 to Roger William Bulwer Jenyns, of Bottisham Hall, Cambridgeshire. They were parents of the art historian Soame Jenyns.

Parliament of the United Kingdom
Preceded by William Henry Gladstone	Member of Parliament for Whitby; 1880–1885	Succeeded by Ernest Beckett
Preceded by Theodore Fry	Member of Parliament for Darlington; 1895–1898	Succeeded by Herbert Pike Pease
