= Mary Gladstone =

British writer and secretary to William Ewart Gladstone (1847-1927)

Mary Drew
- Mary Gladstone
- Born: Mary Gladstone; 23 November 1847; Hawarden, Flintshire, Wales
- Died: 1 January 1927 (aged 79); Hawarden, Flintshire, Wales
- Spouse: Rev. Harry Drew
- Children: Dorothy (Dossie) Mary Catherine Drew (1890-1982)
- Parents: William Ewart Gladstone (father); Catherine Glynne (mother)

Mary Drew (née Gladstone; 23 November 1847 – 1 January 1927) was a political secretary, writer, and hostess. She was the daughter of the British prime minister William Ewart Gladstone, and achieved notability as his advisor, confidante, and private secretary. She also attained a fair degree of political influence by controlling access to him.

== Family ==
The Gladstones were a large and eccentric family. Mary's mother (née Catherine Glynne) and her mother's sister Mary, Lady Lyttelton, married on the same day in the same church, and often kept both families in the same house. Lord Lyttelton, Mary's uncle, recalled finding "seventeen children upon the floor, all under the age of twelve, and consequently all inkstands, books, carpets, furniture, ornaments, in intimate intermixture and in every form of fracture and confusion". In all, there were seven Gladstone and twelve Lyttelton children.

Mary's father's rescue work amongst the prostitutes of London is well known and was considered by many contemporaries unbecoming of a prime minister. His sister went insane after converting to Roman Catholicism, and subsequently used tracts written by Protestant theologians as lavatory paper, an act which incensed the zealously Anglican prime minister.

She and her sister lived a privileged life and she and Helen had their own maid named Auguste Schlüter. Gladstone, growing up against this outré background, was her father's favourite, a plain girl and studious, but with little serious education. Her considerable gumption, however, won her the nickname Von Moltke. After a few infatuations with several uninterested men, she resigned herself to life as a spinster. In 1880, on becoming prime minister for a third term at the age of seventy, her father created her one of his Downing Street secretaries. Thus began her political career: she soon became the door to her father. It was a powerful position in which she delighted.

== Marriage and waning of influence ==
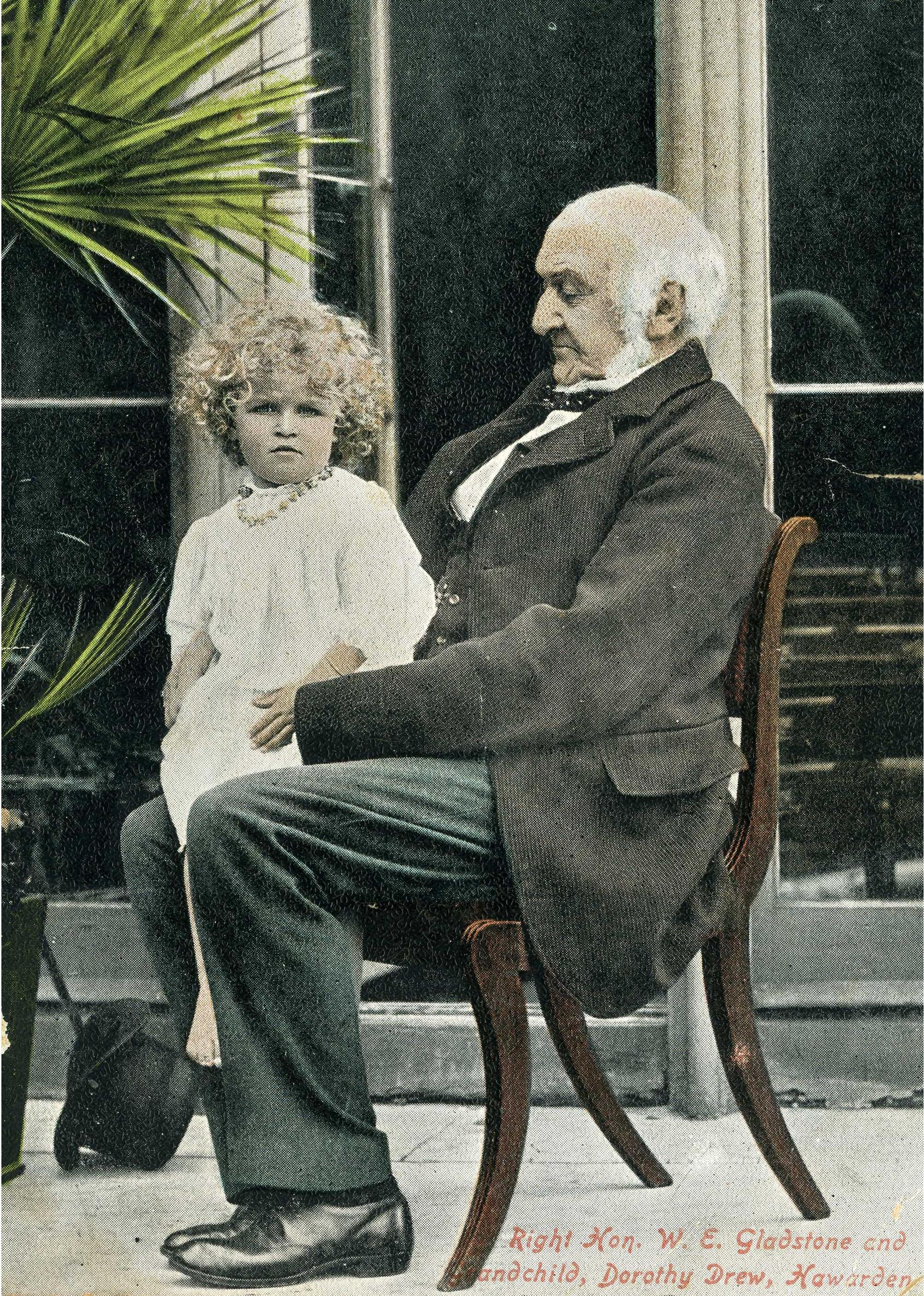
Mary's daughter Dorothy Drew with her grandfather at Hawarden

On 2 February 1886, at the age of 38, Mary Gladstone astounded her friends and family by marrying the Rev. Harry Drew, curate of Hawarden, who was ten years her junior. They were married at St. Margaret's Church, Westminster. The wedding was attended by the Prince and Princess of Wales, their sons and Lord Rosebery. They initially lived in the home of her parents, Hawarden Castle. They had one surviving daughter, Dorothy Mary Catherine Drew, born 11 March 1890, known as "Dossie", who was a favourite of her grandfather.

After W. E. Gladstone's final retirement as prime minister in 1894, her political influence waned. Although a great friend to his successor Lord Rosebery, she was never again able to wield influence.

== Diaries and letters ==
A keen diarist, Gladstone kept copious notes of her father's meetings and conversations, in addition to her own observations of late 19th-century political events. Her archives, "The Mary Gladstone Papers" (some of which were published by Lucy Masterman in 1930 under the title Mary Gladstone (Mrs. Drew), Her Diaries and Letters), are a much-used source of many 20th- and 21st-century biographies of leading figures of the day.

The diary, which served as an emotional outlet, diminished in its thoroughness after her marriage, when what she had previously committed to paper she found she could instead commit to her husband. She wrote nothing at all for the seven years between 1904 and 1911, but picked it up again almost immediately after her husband died. She had intended for a time to publish the diaries herself, but, according to Lucy Masterman, the proofs "were considerably 'edited' and much of the raciness and individuality taken from them. They have therefore been discarded, except as evidence of an intention to publish, wherever the original MS. exists."

Gladstone had an eccentric grammar, employing a sort of long dot as her generic period. Masterman (whom the diary describes at twenty-two as "rather a minx with forward priggy manners") took pains to edit out both this and the many banal lists of attendees at parties and dinners, along with the myriad accounts and analyses of symphony concerts, and evidence of her congenital dayums: "Anniversaries of births, christenings, confirmations, proposals, betrothals, deaths, and funerals were constantly noted, together, of course, with Saints' Days and Festivals of the Church."

=== References ===
Bibliography

- Drew, Mary (1930). Lucy Masterman (ed.). Mary Gladstone (Mrs. Drew): Her Diaries and Letters. London: Methuen.
- Gooddie, Sheila (7 May 2003). Mary Gladstone: A Gentle Rebel. John Welly and Sons Ltd. ISBN 978-0-470-85423-5.
- Weliver, Phyllis (2017). Mary Gladstone and the Victorian Salon: music, literature, liberalism. Cambridge University press. ISBN 978-1-107-18480-0.
