= Helen Gladstone =

British educationist (1849-1925)

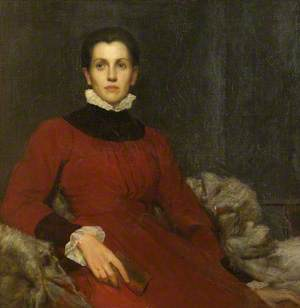
- Helen Gladstone (Newnham College)

Vice-principal of Newnham College
- In office 1892–1896

Personal details
- Born: 28 August 1849 London, England, United Kingdom of Great Britain and Ireland
- Died: 19 August 1925 (aged 75) Hawarden, Flintshire, Wales, United Kingdom
- Parents: William Ewart Gladstone (father); Catherine Glynne (mother)
- Relatives: William Henry Gladstone (brother); Henry Gladstone (brother); Herbert Gladstone (brother)
- Education: Newnham College
- Occupation: Educationist
- Known for: Co-founder of the Women's University Settlement

Helen Gladstone (28 August 1849 – 19 August 1925) was a British educationist, vice-principal at Newnham College in Cambridge, and co-founder of the Women's University Settlement.

== Early life and education ==
Helen Gladstone was born on 28 August 1849 in London to Catherine (née Glynne) and William Ewart Gladstone, later Prime Minister. She came to notice when her sister Mary Gladstone proposed that she should become one of the first students to study at Newnham College in Cambridge. In 1877, aged 28 Helen attended Newnham College as one of 25 students. She decided to not take the tripos but she did pass the higher examination.

== Career ==
After completing her course, Gladstone became the assistant to the first principal Anne Clough, an early English suffragist. Gladstone later became vice principal of Newnham, after Nora Sidgwick in 1892. At Newnham Helen Gladstone was known for her sweetness of disposition and good sense, as well as telling anecdotes that frequently mentioned her father.

In 1886, Gladstone turned down the chance to be the first principal of Royal Holloway College but she suspected that they just wanted "a Gladstone." During the 1890s, Helen and her sisters took turns as the "daughter at home" to take care of their aging and increasingly frail parents, and in 1896, she regretfully decided to step down from her post at Newnham and move back to the family home for the remainder of her parents' lives. Both of her parents had died by 1900.

Inspired by Henrietta Barnett and the work of Toynbee Hall (founded in 1884), in 1887 a number of women from Girton and Newnham Colleges at Cambridge University, Lady Margaret and Somerville Colleges at Oxford University and Bedford and Royal Holloway Universities, including Gladstone, Octavia Hill, and Alice Gruner, co-founded the Women's University Settlement. The Women's University Settlement was founded with the aim to "promote the welfare of the poorer districts of London, more especially of the women and children, by devising and advancing schemes which tend to elevate them, and by giving them additional opportunities in education and recreation". Formed as part of the Settlement Movement, a social reform movement "based on the idea that middle class people (settlers) would live among the working poor as moral and intellectual guiding exemplars, rather than provide mere financial support through charity work", women from London colleges were invited to live at the Settlement at 44 Nelson Square, in Southwark.

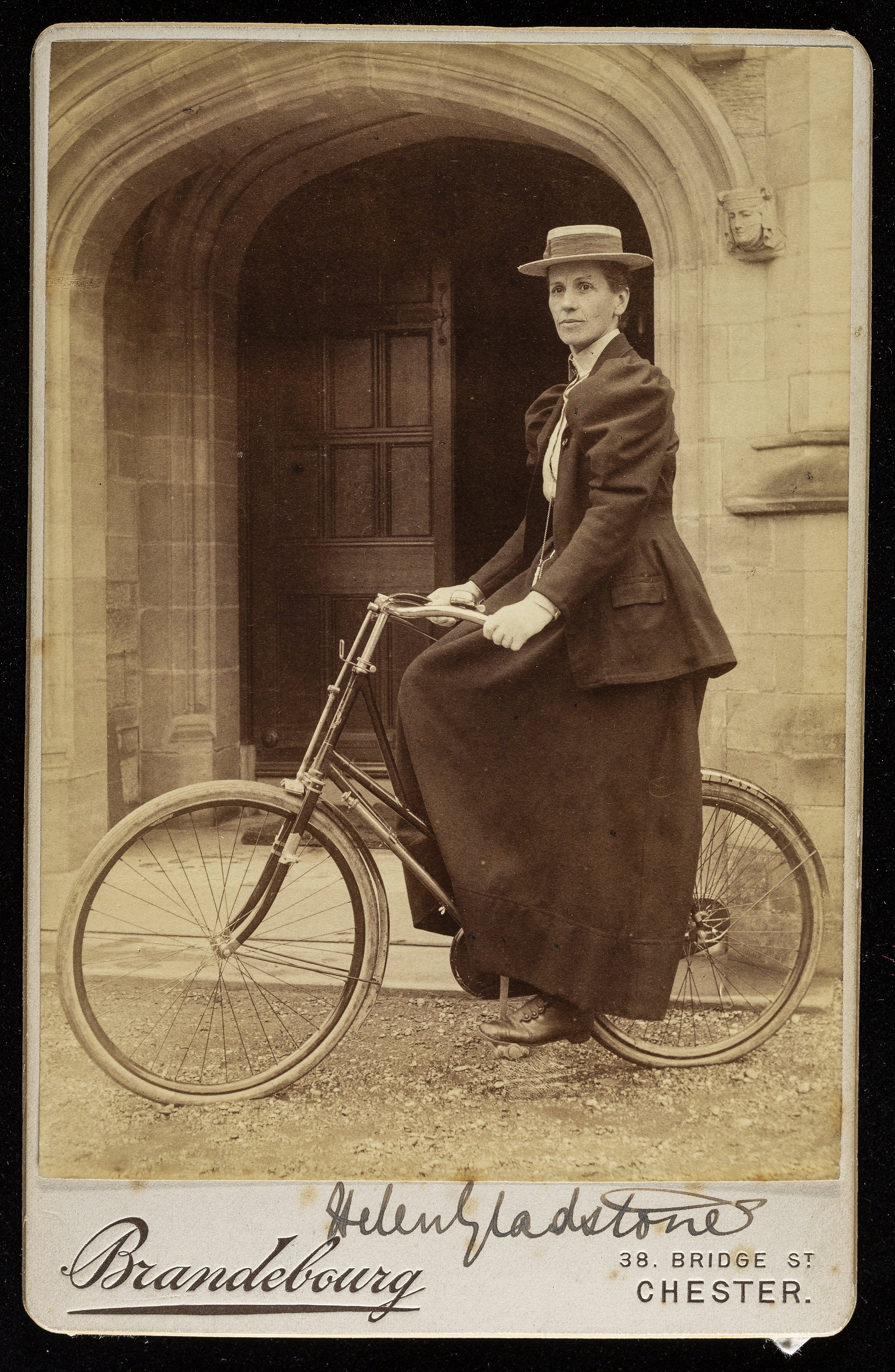
Reproduced in The Sketch, 6 October 1897

In 1901 Gladstone became the second Warden of the Blackfriars Settlement, succeeding Margaret Sewell. While dedicated to the Settlement's objectives, She found the organisational side of the Warden's position far less congenial, and stood down after five years.

In 1922, the diaries of her former lady's maid, Auguste Schlüter (1849–1917), were published posthumously. Schlüter had kept in contact with the Gladstone family after returning to Hanover in 1890, having served them since the 1860s.

Gladstone died in Hawarden in 1925.

== Family ==
Helen Gladstone was the sixth of eight children of Catherine Gladstone (nee Glynne) and William Ewart Gladstone, the Liberal politician and four-time British prime minister.

She was an avid cyclist, and would often go on rides with her sister Mary.
