= Baron Noel-Buxton =

Barony in the Peerage of the United Kingdom

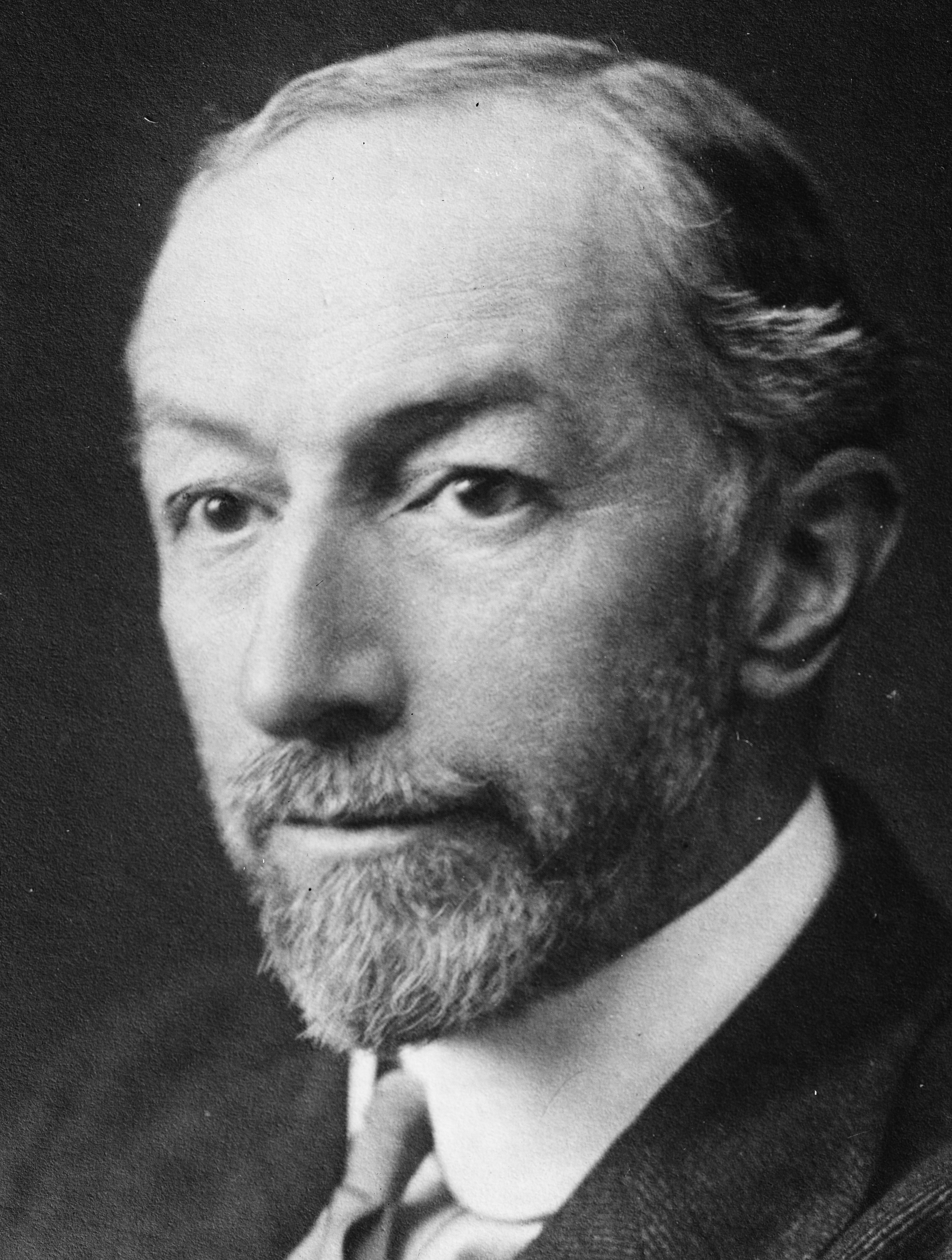
Noel Noel-Buxton, 1st Baron Noel-Buxton

Baron Noel-Buxton, of Aylsham in the County of Norfolk, is a title in the Peerage of the United Kingdom. It was created on 17 June 1930 for the politician Noel Noel-Buxton, who was the second son of Sir Thomas Buxton, 3rd Baronet, of Belfield, and a great-grandson of the philanthropist Sir Thomas Fowell Buxton, 1st Baronet, of Belfield, as well as a great-nephew of Charles Buxton, the father of Sydney Buxton, 1st Earl Buxton. As of 2017 the title is held by his great-grandson, the fourth Baron, who succeeded his father in 2013. Another member of the Buxton family is Aubrey Buxton, who was created a life peer as Baron Buxton of Alsa in 1978. He is the son of Leland William Wilberforce Buxton, youngest son of the third Baronet.

== Barons Noel-Buxton (1930) ==
- Noel Edward Noel-Buxton, 1st Baron Noel-Buxton (1869–1948)
- Rufus Alexander Buxton, 2nd Baron Noel-Buxton (1917–1980)
- Martin Connal Noel-Buxton, 3rd Baron Noel-Buxton (1940–2013)
- Charles Connal Noel-Buxton, 4th Baron Noel-Buxton (b. 1975)

The heir presumptive is the present holder's cousin, Christopher John Noel Buxton (b. 1988).

== See also ==
- Buxton baronets, of Belfield
- Earl Buxton
