= Alice Gruner =

Alice Gruner (1846–1929) was a lecturer, social worker, and a principal founder of the Women's University Settlement, Southwark (today Blackfriars Settlement).

== Life and work ==
Alice Gruner was born in Estonia in 1846, moving to England with her sister, Joan, at the age of 18. She became a naturalised British subject in 1896.

Between 1883-1886 she was a student at Newnham College, Cambridge. Gruner tutored Emily Elizabeth Constance Jones for the Girton College entrance exams, on the recommendation of Emily Davies. Joan Gruner, Alice's sister, had been a student at Girton 1874-1877, as well as at Trinity College, Dublin, and was a school principal.

In 1887, Gruner was among the founders of the Women's University Settlement, Southwark. Alongside Gruner and other Cambridge University graduates, the original committee included educationist Helen Gladstone and social reformer Octavia Hill. Following the example of the growing University Settlement movement, their aim was to "promote the welfare of the poorer districts of London, more especially of the women and children, by devising and advancing schemes which tend to elevate them, and by giving them additional opportunities in education and recreation".

For twenty years, Gruner was also Secretary to the Association of University Women Teachers, founded to protect the interests and improve the position of women teachers at the university level. Here, her 'experience and untiring devotion to the work made her a most valuable adviser both to those who offered and those who were seeking educational posts.' Her obituary in The Times noted that in this role 'she helped to raise the status of women teachers, and the standard of education in schools'. Gruner also worked for the cause of women's suffrage.

Alice Gruner died on 29 December 1929.
