= Catherine Gladstone =

Wife of William Gladstone (1812–1900)

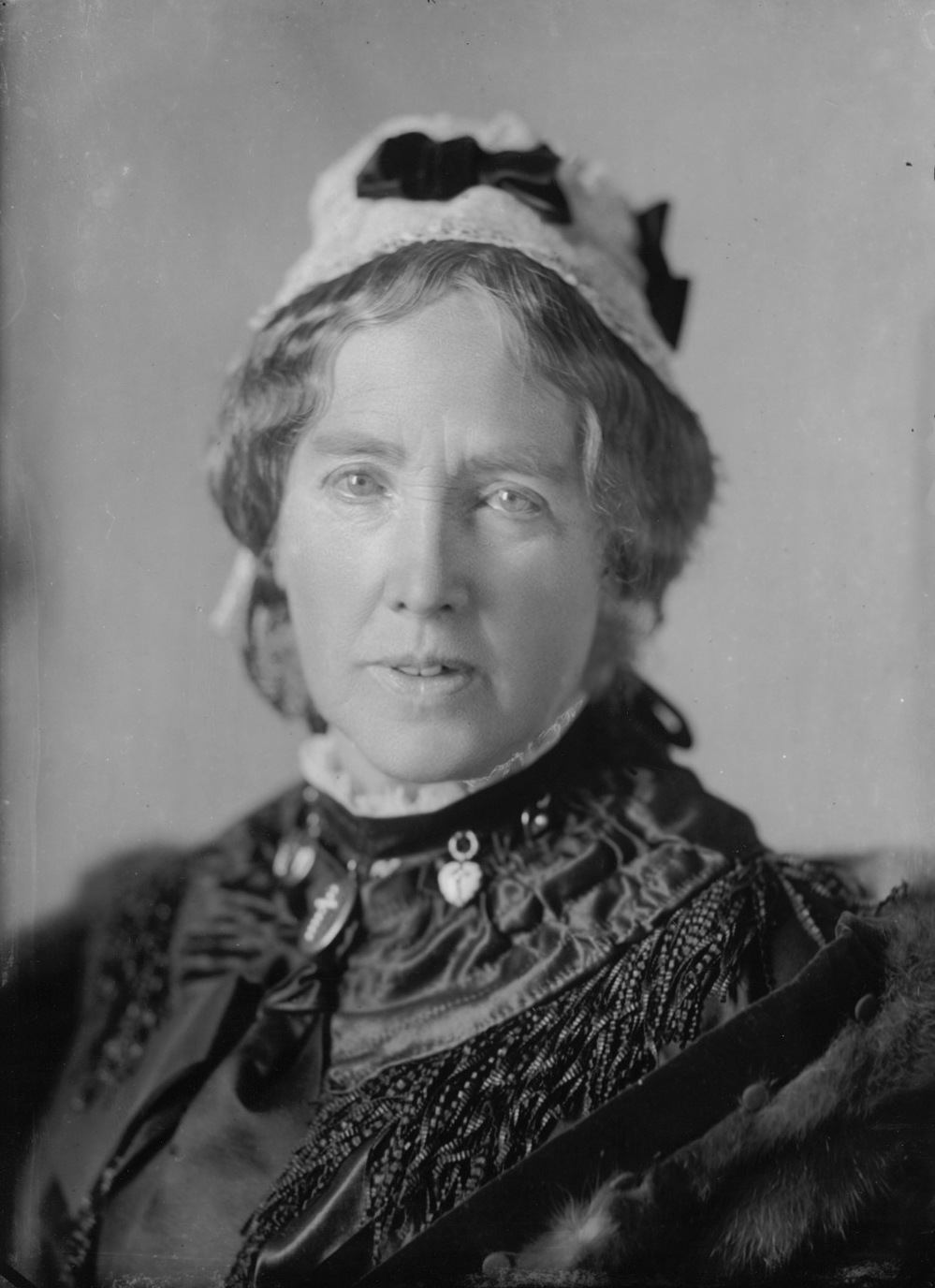
- Gladstone in 1883
- Born: Catherine Glynne; 6 January 1812; Flintshire, Wales
- Died: 14 June 1900 (aged 88); Flintshire, Wales
- Resting place: Westminster Abbey
- Known for: Spouse of the prime minister of the United Kingdom (1868–74; 1880–85; 1886; 1892–94)
- Spouse: William Ewart Gladstone (m. 1839; died 1898)
- Children: 8, including William, Helen, Mary, Henry and Herbert
- Father: Sir Stephen Glynne, 8th Baronet

Signature
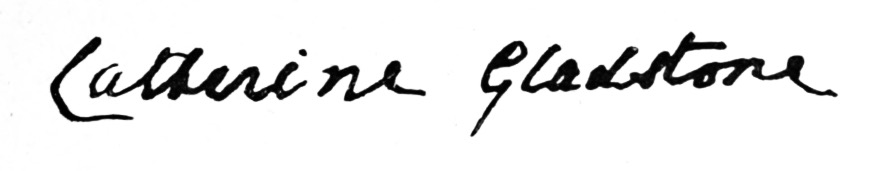

Catherine Gladstone (née Glynne; 6 January 1812 – 14 June 1900) was the wife of British statesman William Ewart Gladstone for 59 years, from 1839 until his death in 1898.

== Early life and family ==
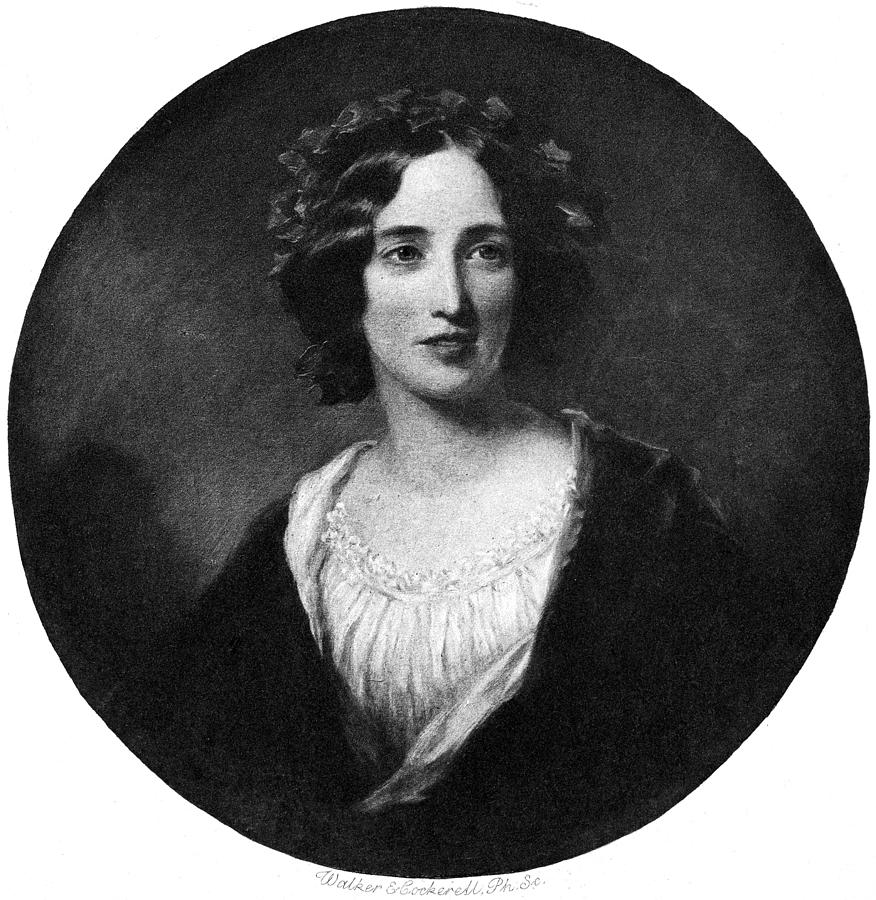
From a portrait of Gladstone by Frederick Richard Say. Completed 1856.

Catherine Glynne was the daughter of Hon. Mary (née Griffin), second daughter of 2nd Baron Braybrooke and Sir Stephen Glynne, 8th Baronet, of Hawarden Castle. Her father died when she was only three, and her brother Stephen Glynne, 9th Baronet inherited the estate aged seven. She was raised with her sister Mary by her mother. The Glynne sisters, very close, were renowned for their beauty. They married on the same day, 25 July 1839, in Hawarden Church, and their families visited one another and holidayed together incessantly. Catharine married William Ewart Gladstone and Mary married George Lyttelton, 4th Baron Lyttelton. When Mary, Lady Lyttelton, died in 1857, Catherine acted in some ways as mother to her children.

Her brother Stephen succeeded to the baronetcy in 1815. On his death in 1874, the Glynne baronetcy became extinct and the estates passed to Catherine and William's eldest son, William Henry. Through the myriad strains and links in her heredity, Catherine found herself, according to Lucy Masterman, related in one way or another to "half the famous names in English political history".

== Personal life ==
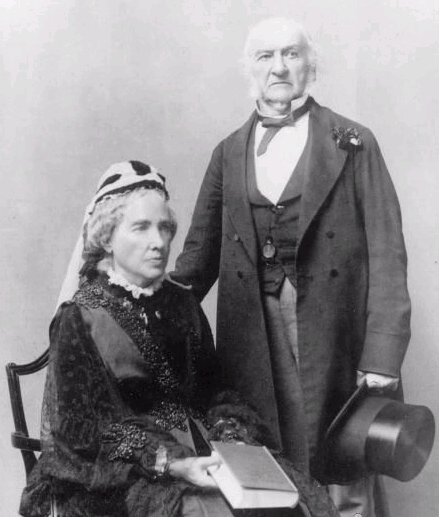
Catherine with her husband, William, in 1889.

It was through her brother Stephen, who represented Flint as a Liberal MP, that Catherine met William Gladstone, reputedly in 1834 at the home in Tilney Street, London, of James Milnes Gaskell, one of Gladstone's Old Etonian friends and then Tory MP for Wenlock. They were married on 25 July 1839 and lived at her ancestral home Hawarden Castle, in Flintshire, Wales. They had eight children,

- William Henry Gladstone MP (1840–1891); married Hon. Gertrude Stuart (daughter of Charles Stuart, 12th Lord Blantyre) in 1875. They had three children.
- Agnes Gladstone (1842–1931); she married Very Rev. Edward Wickham in 1873. They had three children.
- The Rev. Stephen Edward Gladstone (1844–1920); he married Annie Wilson in 1885. They had five children: their eldest son Albert, inherited the Gladstone baronetcy in 1945.
- Catherine Jessy Gladstone (1845–1850); died aged 5 on 9 April 1850 from meningitis
- Mary Gladstone (1847–1927); she married Reverend Harry Drew in 1886. They had one daughter, Dorothy.
- Helen Gladstone (1849–1925), Vice-Principal of Newnham College, Cambridge
- Henry Neville Gladstone, 1st Baron Gladstone of Hawarden (1852–1935); he married Hon. Maud Rendel in 1890.
- Herbert Gladstone, 1st Viscount Gladstone, MP (1854–1930), 1st governor-general of South Africa (1910–1914); he married Dorothy Paget in 1901.

She died on 14 June 1900 and was buried next to her late husband in Westminster Abbey. Their daughter Mary referred to them collectively as "The Great People".

== Character ==
"Catherine Gladstone", wrote Lucy Masterman, "was one of those informal geniuses who conduct life, and with complete success, on what the poverty of language compels me to call a method of their own."

She was "like a fresh breeze" wherever she went and could, wrote a friend, grasp the subject of a discussion in "a few minutes' airy inattention". Unlike her husband, she was a notoriously untidy person, habitually leaving her letters strewn on the floor in the well-founded faith that someone would eventually pick them up and post them. Her chests of drawers were similarly messy, and she was rarely much bothered with fancy attire. "What a bore you would have been," she teased her husband, "if you had married someone as tidy as you are."

If her own life was always somewhat dishevelled, she went to great pains to improve the lives of others as a founder of convalescent homes, orphanages and the like. "Few people", wrote Masterman, "can have given so much of themselves to so many, and can have been directly responsible for more practical and effectual enterprises. This seems to have been achieved by a mind that kept the thread of its intentions through a series of inspired impulses and improvisations sustained, it should be said, by a circle of devoted people whose minds worked on more conventional lines."

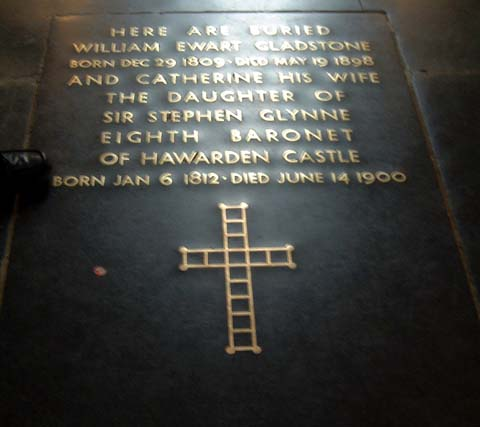
William and Catherine Gladstone's grave in Westminster Abbey

Party political offices
New office	President of the Women's Liberal Federation; 1887–1893	Succeeded by Ishbel Hamilton-Gordon
