= Blackfriars Settlement =

Charitable organization in the UK

- Headquarters: 1 Rushworth Street, London SE1 0RB
- Website: https://blackfriars-settlement.org.uk/

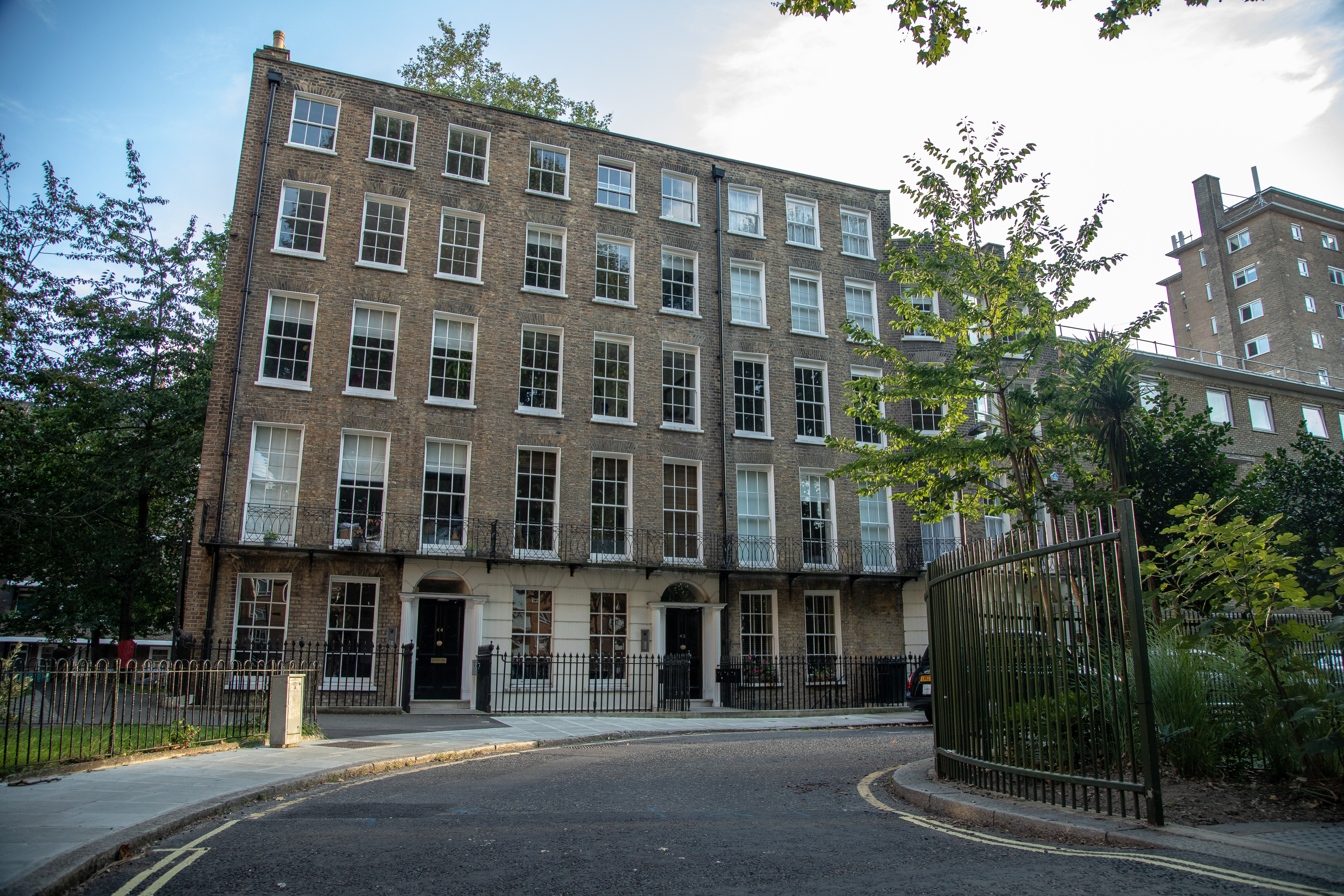
Blackfriars Settlement building and attached railings in Nelson Square

Blackfriars Settlement in London's SE1 borough of Southwark is the charitable organisation in the UK established to improve the well-being of disadvantaged people. It was originally established as the Women's University Settlement in 1887, and focused especially on the needs of women and children. It was part of the settlement movement promoted by Rev Samuel Barnett who prompted young people with university educations to settle in the worst areas of poverty. The Women's Library has an archival collection of documents related to the group.

== History ==
The Women's University Settlement was founded after a talk by Henrietta Barnett to the Cambridge Ladies' Discussion Society. Toynbee Hall had been founded in 1884, and female students resolved to set up a similar project. Representatives from Girton College and Newnham College at Cambridge University, and Lady Margaret Hall and Somerville College at Oxford University, formed the Women's University Association. At its inception, a Newnham student Alice Gruner was appointed Head Worker, and the organization was based at her house at 44 Nelson Square, Southwark. Other Newnham students involved in the venture included Mary Paley Marshall, Nora Sidgwick, and the Prime Minister's daughter Helen Gladstone. Octavia Hill, who became a housing reformer and founder of the National Trust, was also an active member. In 1888 the Association was renamed the Women's University Settlement. Gruber resigned as Warden, and in 1891 a paid Warden, Margaret Sewell, was appointed. By 1895 the Settlement had 31 resident and 61 non-resident workers. It organized children's clubs, holiday treats and classes in music and dance for local children. Helen Gladstone served as Warden in the early twentieth century.

By 1912 the Settlement had started to train social workers for work elsewhere. However, its lack of institutional funding forced a public appeal for funds, to buy a hall and ensure a secure financial footing. In 1926 the Settlement's activities included a baby centre, a mixed children's club for boys and girls, the Southwark Boys' Aid Association, work on care committees and remedial exercises and light treatment for children. Graham Wallas, presiding at the organization's AGM (Annual General Meeting), saw it as exemplifying the way in which social work had moved from Victorian amateurism to professional activity on scientific lines. Wyndham Deedes reported ongoing growth at the 1929 AGM: a nursing school, a clothes sale section and a legal aid department had been established, and the number of children under the Settlement's infant welfare section had risen to 1,200.

In 1961 the group's name was changed to Blackfriars Settlement in respect to men's involvement and to be more inclusive of local community involvement.

The organization moved into the Rushworth Street building in 1992, a purpose-built structure that replaced a run-down Georgian Town House. It in turn became dated with leaks in its flat roof and Blackfriars rented accommodations on at Suffolk Street while renovations took place.

Margaret Wheeler, Baroness Wheeler who heads UNISON and serves in the House of Lords was the group's trustee and chair, until the merger in 2018.

In 2010, the organization moved its headquarters to Great Suffolk Street. Workers on the nearby Blackfriars Station made a donation to the charity.

The organisation moved into its new, purpose-built property back at the Rushworth Street site in 2012.

Rev. Mark Beach became the group's director in 2015 succeeding Julie Corbett-Bird. He left in 2018.

In May 2018, following a difficult financial period, Blackfriars Settlement merged with the Mary Ward Settlement. It remains a separately constituted charity, but is a wholly owned subsidiary of Mary Ward Settlement. In 2019, the organisation received funding for pop-up friendliness cafés.
