= Nelson Square =

Garden square in London, England

Coordinates: 51.5030°N 0.1033°W

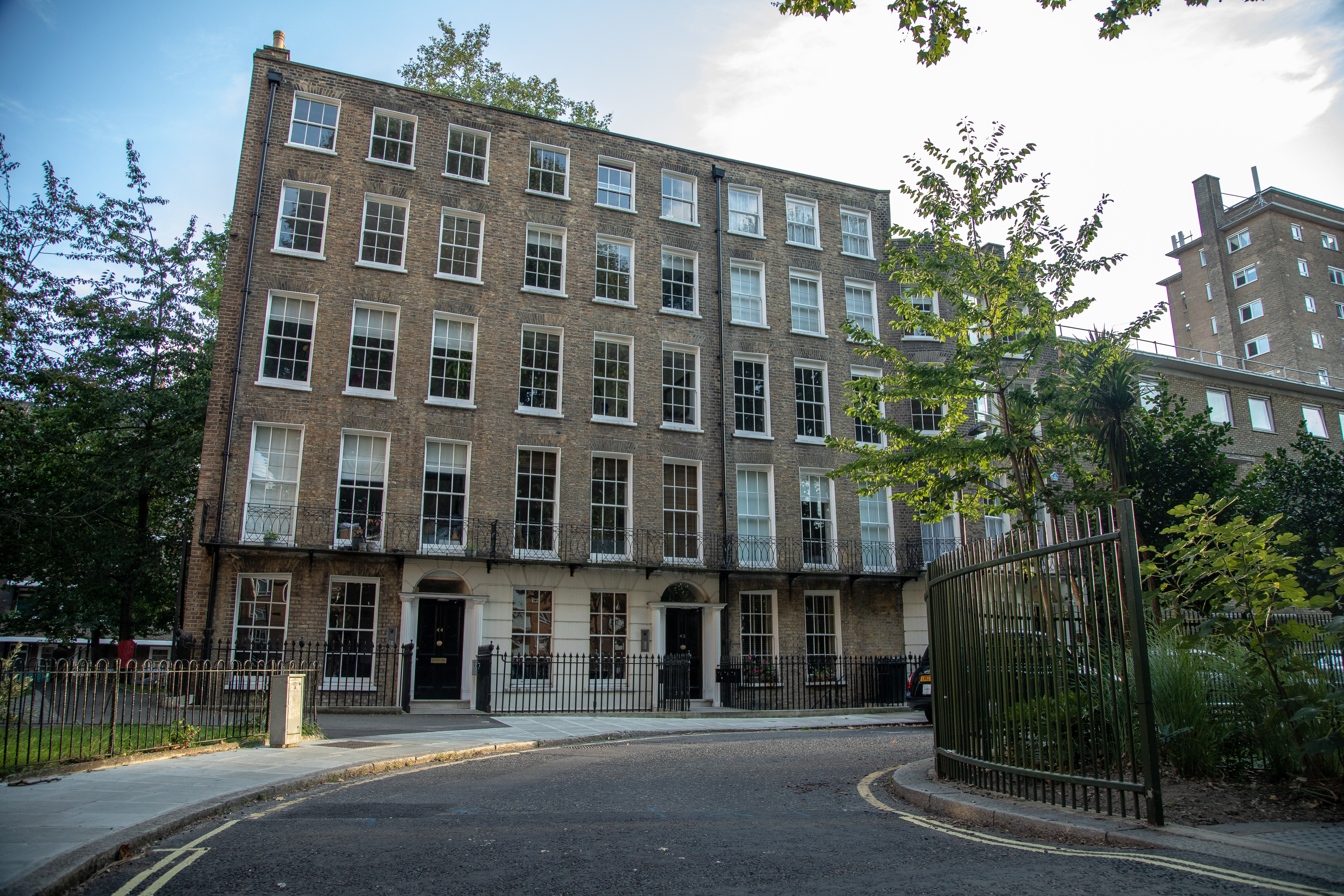
44–47 Nelson Square. The surviving original buildings, formerly the home of the Blackfriars Settlement.

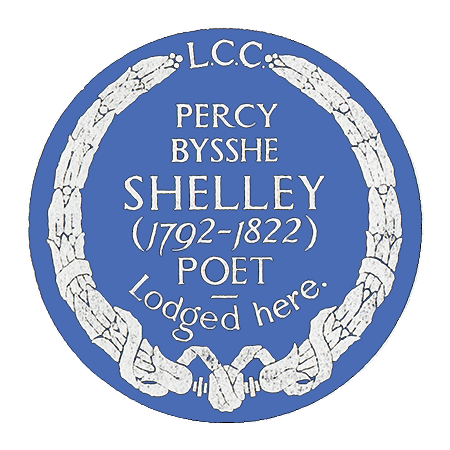
Image of the blue plaque that once stood on the former residence of the poet Percy Bysshe Shelley. The property was destroyed in a Second World War air raid.

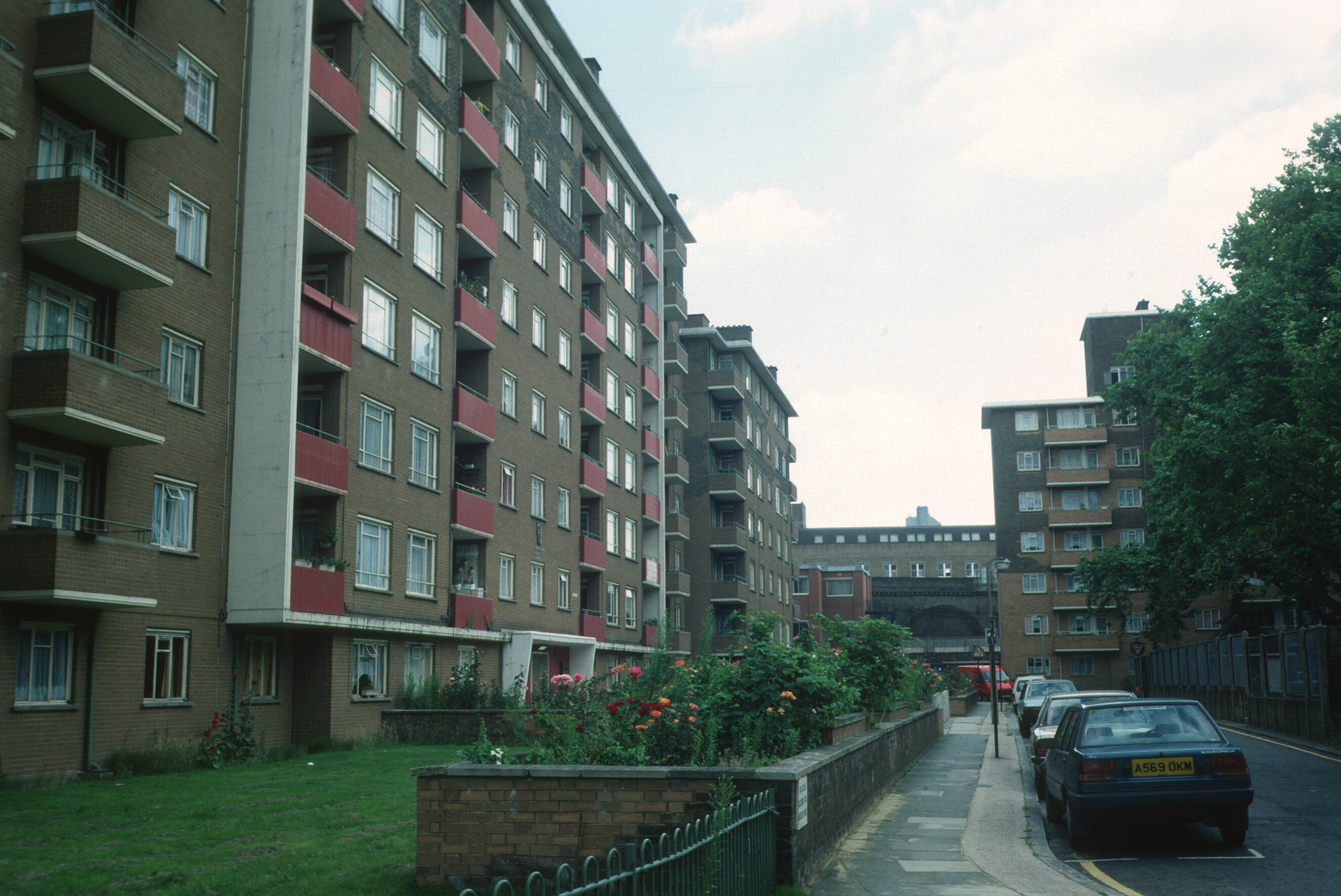
View of the square during the 1980s. High rise buildings having mostly replaced the original Regency houses.

Nelson Square is a garden square located close to Southwark tube station in the London Borough of Southwark. It was laid out around 1807 as upmarket terraced housing and named after Admiral Horatio Nelson whose death during his victory at the Battle of Trafalgar in 1805 made him a national hero. It runs off Blackfriars Road to the west and Union Street to the north, while Great Suffolk Street is located a little to the east. The railway running towards Blackfriars Station passes near the eastern end of the square on a viaduct.

The square was developed on land owned by Sir Francis Wood, 2nd Baronet, and was most likely entirely designed by the architect Samuel Pepys Cockerell. The poet Percy Bysshe Shelley and his wife Mary Shelley lodged at 26 Nelson Square, which was later commemorated by a blue plaque until a German bombing raid in the Second World War destroyed the building. In 1884 the charitable Blackfriars Settlement was established in the square, at the home of Helen Gladstone. It moved to nearby Great Suffolk Street in 2010. Other notable residents have included Thomas Barnes, the editor of The Times, and the surgeon Charles Aldis.

== Bibliography ==
- Bebbington, Gillian. London Street Names. Batsford, 1972.
- Cherry, Bridget & Pevsner, Nikolaus. London 4: South. Yale University Press, 2002.
- Fairfield, Sheila. The Streets Of London: A Dictionary Of The Names And Their Origins. Papermac, 1983.
