= Gervase Beckett =

British banker and Conservative politician (1866–1937)

The Honourable Sir Gervase Beckett Bt

Member of Parliament for Leeds North
- In office 1923–1929

Member of Parliament for Scarborough and Whitby
- In office 1918–1922

Member of Parliament for Whitby
- In office 1906–1918

Personal details
- Born: William Gervase Beckett-Denison; 14 January 1866 Meanwood, West Riding of Yorkshire, England
- Died: 24 August 1937 (aged 71) London, England

Sir William Gervase Beckett, 1st Baronet (born William Gervase Beckett-Denison; 14 January 1866 – 24 August 1937) was a British banker and Conservative politician.

== Business career ==
Beckett was the son of William Beckett-Denison MP. He was educated at Eton College and joined the family banking business, Beckett & Co, in Leeds. After the firm was taken over by the Westminster Bank he joined the bank's board. He was also chairman of the Yorkshire Post and proprietor and editor of the Saturday Review. His elder brother, Ernest, succeeded his uncle as 2nd Baron Grimthorpe in 1905 and Beckett was granted the precedence of a baron's son and the right to use the style "The Honourable".

== Parliamentary career ==
He was elected at the 1906 general election as Member of Parliament for Whitby. When that constituency was abolished for the 1918 general election, he was returned for the new Scarborough and Whitby constituency. He did not contest the 1922 general election, but returned to the House of Commons at the 1923 general election as Member of Parliament for Leeds North, and held that seat until he retired from Parliament at the 1929 election.

== Military career ==
Beckett was commissioned a Lieutenant in the 3rd (Militia) Battalion, Green Howards in 1884, but resigned his commission in 1886. He was commissioned a Second Lieutenant in the Yorkshire Hussars in 1888. He was promoted Lieutenant in 1895 and Captain in 1898, and resigned his commission in 1901 During the First World War he returned to service as Assistant Military Secretary of Northern Command from 1914 to 1916. He was Assistant Director of the Department of War Trade from 1918 to 1919.

== Family ==
He married the Honourable Mabel Theresa Duncombe (1877–1913) the daughter of William Duncombe, Viscount Helmsley. They had four daughters:

- Marion Frances Theresa Beckett (8 Nov 1896 – 2 Feb 1972) married Vice-Admiral Henry Jack Egerton, son of Charles Augustus Egerton and Lady Mabel Annie Brassey, on 16 October 1919
- Cynthia Maud Beckett (15 Dec 1900 – 25 Dec 1969) married Captain John Arthur Davison, son of Major Arthur Pearson Davison, on 10 November 1919. Divorced 1928. She married German author and BT-correspondent Kurt Hermann Paul Otto Valerio Baron von Stutterheim (1888-1978), son of Richard Karl Ludwig Baron von Stutterheim, on 10 July 1929. Divorced in 1952.
- Beatrice Helen Beckett (26 Jul 1905 – 29 Jun 1957) – married Anthony Eden in 1923. Divorced in 1950.
- Ann Prunella Beckett (16 Sep 1907 – 17 Mar 2001) married Lt.-Col. Harry Rumbold Bathurst Norman, son of Reverend Harry Bathurst Norman, on 15 April 1936.

Secondly he married Lady Marjorie Blanche Eva Greville, daughter of Francis Richard Charles Guy Greville, 5th Earl of Warwick and Frances Evelyn Maynard, on 1 November 1917. Lady Greville was the widow of Charles Duncombe, 2nd Earl of Feversham, his first wife's brother. This marriage produced one son:

- Sir Martyn Gervase Beckett, 2nd Bt (6 Nov 1918 – 5 Aug 2001)

The publisher Sir Rupert Hart-Davis (1907-1999) was legally the son of stockbroker Richard Hart-Davis and his wife Sybil, daughter of the surgeon Sir Alfred Cooper; by the time of his conception, the Hart-Davises were estranged, and Sybil had numerous lovers at that period. Hart-Davis considered Beckett to be the most likely candidate for his natural father.

Beckett was created a baronet in the 1921 Birthday Honours, as Sir Gervase Beckett, 1st Baronet Beckett, of Kirkdale Manor in the County of Yorkshire.

== Sources ==
- Leigh Rayment's list of baronets
- Leigh Rayment's Historical List of MPs
- Obituary, The Times, 25 August 1937
- Craig, F. W. S. (1983) [1969]. British parliamentary election results 1918-1949 (3rd ed.). Chichester: Parliamentary Research Services. ISBN 0-900178-06-X.

Parliament of the United Kingdom
Preceded by Noel Buxton	Member of Parliament for Whitby; 1906–1918	Constituency abolished
New constituency	Member of Parliament for Scarborough and Whitby; 1918–1922	Succeeded by Sidney Herbert
Preceded by Hugh Myddleton Butler	Member of Parliament for Leeds North; 1923–1929	Succeeded by Osbert Peake
Baronetage of the United Kingdom
New creation	Baronet (of Kirkdale Manor); 1921–1937	Succeeded by Martyn Gervase Beckett
