= James Likoudis =

American Catholic theologian (1928–2024)

- Born: 11 December 1928; Lackawanna, New York, US
- Died: 3 September 2024 (aged 95); Detroit, Michigan, US
- Education: Elmira College (M.S.); University of Buffalo (B.A.)
- Occupations: Catholic theologian, author, journalist, and seminary professor
- Writing career
- Subjects: Catholicism, Eastern Orthodoxy, traditionalism, liturgy, doctrine, papacy, sex education, catechetics, pro-life, American politics, conservatism, liberalism, history, church history, Vatican II

James Likoudis (December 11, 1928 – September 3, 2024) was an American Catholic theologian, author and lecturer in religious studies.

== Career ==
A convert to the Catholic Church in 1952 from the Greek Orthodox Church, the Christian faith into which he was baptized, Likoudis later devoted a great deal of his apologetical and polemical efforts to foster reunion and submission of the Eastern Orthodox Churches to the See of Rome and the Papacy. In his essay, To be Truly Orthodox is to be in Communion with Peter's See (1988), Likoudis gives an account of his personal journey from to the Greek Orthodox Church to the Greek Byzantine Catholic Church.

In 1977 Likoudis's translation of Renée Casin's St. Thomas Aquinas: Orthodoxy, and Neo-Modernism in the Church from French to English was published. He also authored several books dealing with sex education, the Eastern Orthodox Church and its teachings, liturgical issues and controversies following the Second Vatican Council, and articles and commentary about prominent Catholics. He was the president emeritus of the Catholic lay organization Catholics United for the Faith (CUF) and the founder of Credo of Buffalo.

While working with CUF, Likoudis led the charge to remove ecclesiastical approval from the theologically problematic "Christ Among Us" Catechism, a campaign that was eventually heard by the Vatican's CDF head, Cardinal Ratzinger (later Pope Benedict XVI). The CDF took action to remove the Imprimatur and Nihil Obstat before eventually requesting that Paulist Press cease further production and sales of the book. Similarly, Likoudis played a prominent role in bringing to the Vatican's awareness the theological Modernism being taught at Catholic University of America by Charles Curran. After many years and many more reports, Curran was removed from his teaching position by the Church hierarchy.

Likoudis was a president of Morality in Media, an organization now known as The National Center on Sexual Exploitation – an organization that campaigns against pornography, sex education and sex trafficking. The organization describes its goal as "exposing the links between all forms of sexual exploitation". In its beginnings, the organization was primarily Catholic. He was also the former moderator of the New York TV series Sex and Morality.

Another significant contribution of Likoudis is his work with the late Dietrich von Hildebrand and his wife Alice von Hildebrand in their work on sex education, through the organization Veil of Innocence. In addition to being involved with “Veil” through writing and lecturing, Likoudis additionally served the organization as one of its board members. One of his accomplishments during this time was his contribution of an essay to the published work of Dietrich's: Sex Education: The Basic Issues and Related Essays which contains a personally penned letter of recommendation inside the front pages, from Mother Teresa.

Likoudis also helped to found the John Hardon S.J.'s organization, Eternal Life, as well as contributing to some of Hardon's books, most notably, penning the foreword to the Hardon's published dissertation which he completed at the Gregorian in Rome on the topic of "Bellarmine's Doctrine of the Relation of Sincere Non-Catholics to the Catholic Church".

Likoudis' book Ending the Byzantine Greek Schism aims to answer historical criticisms as well as theological objections raised by apologists for Orthodox Christianity.

In Likoudis' The Divine Primacy of the Bishop of Rome and Modern Eastern Orthodoxy: Letters to a Greek Orthodox on the Unity of the Church, he refutes the objections of Orthodox and Protestant critics to modern Roman Papal claims. An earlier edition of this book – The Divine Primacy of the Bishop of Rome, Reply to a Former Catholic – was written particularly to refute Eastern Orthodox writer, Michael Whelton's arguments, put forth in his book, Two Paths.

His last book in this trilogy is Eastern Orthodoxy and the See of Peter in which he outlines some current controversies, as well as identifies pathways forward for reconciliation of both sides and shows a portrait of a saint who devoted his life to this ecumenical endeavor and modeled it in his personal life.

His later book is Heralds of a Catholic Russia – Twelve Spiritual Pilgrims, from Byzantium to Rome. This book contains portraits of saints, philosophers, and royalty, who all found their way from Orthodoxy to Catholicism through intellectual engagement with the arguments for and against Catholicism. The book ends with a pertinent section on Our Lady of Fátima's apparitions and messages and their relevance to the future for the Catholic Church in Russia.

Likoudis co-authored The Pope, the Council and the Mass (Christopher Publishing House, 1981 and 1982; Rev. Ed. Emmaus Road Publishing, 2006), a defense of Pope Paul VI's Ordo Missae and the liturgical reforms envisaged by Vatican II. L'Osservatore Romano noted in 1981, "This book has been sorely needed for well over a decade."

Likoudis lectured extensively on issues affecting education, family life, and the role of the laity in the Catholic Church. He also wrote for The Wanderer (see below). Additionally, he was a contributing author to the Encyclopedia of Catholic Social Thought, Social Science and Social Policy as well as the widely acclaimed Faith and Life children's catechetical series published by Catholics United for the Faith which is used as a primary resource in many Catholic schools.

He appeared on numerous shows including EWTN's Journey Home network, the Mother Angelica show, Geraldo, The Phil Donahue Show, and most recently, the Reason and Theology show. He was a part of conferences hosted by and with the Franciscan University of Steubenville, Dr. Robert Fastiggi, and Mother Angelica, among others.

In 2020, Likoudis received an honorary doctorate from Detroit's Sacred Heart Major Seminary for his work in Catholic apologetics, catechetics, ecumenism, and Catholic – Eastern Orthodox relations. He was a member of Aleteia's Board of Experts, a former member of the Fellowship of Catholic Scholars and the Society of Catholic Social Scientists, and worked as a consultant for Catholic Answers’ apologetics website.

== Awards ==
In 1957 Likoudis received a Summer Scholarship in Middle East Studies from the University of Rochester.

He is the 1968 Harvest Yearbook Dedication Recipient for his philosophy of life, and inspirational approach to critical thinking.

In 1973 he received the Morality in Media award.

He is listed in the American Catholic Who's Who: Bicentennial edition.

In 2002, he received the Blessed Frederick Ozanam Award for Catholic Social Action, which was presented at the October 18, 2002, annual meeting of the Society for Catholic Social Scientists.

In December 2020, Likoudis received an honorary Doctor of Divinity degree from Sacred Heart Major Seminary.

== Personal life ==
Likoudis married Ruth (née Hickleton), with whom he had six children. After Ruth's death, Likoudis lived in Ann Arbor, Michigan until his death on September 3, 2024.

== Works ==
Likoudis authored over 300 essays and books.

== Books ==
- Ending the Byzantine Greek Schism (1992) ISBN 9781879860018
- The Pope, the Council, and the Mass: Answers to Questions the Traditionalists Have Asked (2006) ISBN 9781931018340
- The Divine Mosaic: Piecing Together Catholic and Orthodox Unity (2023) ISBN 9798888701003
- The Divine Primacy of the Bishop of Rome and Modern Eastern Orthodoxy (2023) ISBN 9781645853145
- Heralds of a Catholic Russia: Twelve Spiritual Pilgrims from Byzantium to Rome (2024) ISBN 9798988637721
- Mary, Star of the New Evangelization (2024) ISBN 9798888701935
- Unpacking Palamism: A Catholic Critique (2024) ISBN 9798888701188

== Articles ==
- A Grievous Distortion of the Catechism of the Catholic Church (Serviam newsletter, May/June 1993, April 1994)
- A Modern Dissenter's Theology of Sexuality: Moral Theologian Richard C. Sparks, CSP (Social Justice Review, May/June 2001)
- Abortion And Limbo (The Wanderer)
- Countering the Eclipse of Sin in Marriage Preparation (The Wanderer, May 25, 2006)
- Eastern Orthodoxy: Primacy and Reunion (The American Ecclesiastical Review, February 1966)
- Fr. William J. Bausch: His Chickens Come Home to Roost (The Wanderer, August 25, 2005)
- Honored or Ignored?: Truth and Meaning of Human Sexuality: Guidelines for Education Within The Family (Sex Education: The Basic Issues and Related Essays, January 31, 2001)
- Is 'Together for Life' Faithful to Magisterial Teaching on Contraception? (1990)
- The Marks Of The Church And Eastern Orthodoxy (Homiletic & Pastoral Review, March 2003)
- Msgr. Joseph M. Champlin as Liturgist (The Wanderer, December 28, 2006)
- On Monika the Modernist (Serviam newsletter, February – March 1994)
- The Catholic-Orthodox Dialogue: Light and Shadows (The Wanderer, February 3, 2005)
- The 'Church of the East' Sheds Light on the Roman Primacy (The Wanderer, September 21, 2006)
- The Modernized Jesus of the RENEW "Process" (The Christian Order, May 1986)
- The Pentecostalism Controversy (September 11, 1973)
- The Theology of Sexuality of a Modern Dissenter: Rev. Richard C. Sparks, CSP (May 1996)
- Trivialising Christ Our Lord (The Christian Order, May 1988)
- What They Are Saying about Mary to Destroy the Faith of Catholics (Serviam newsletter, CREDO, Buffalo, New York)
- What to Think of "Small Faith Communities" (CUF News, May/June/July 1996)
- Yet More on Monika the Modernist (The Wanderer, June 23, 1994)
