= Paul Morgan (bishop) =

British Catholic traditionalist bishop

His Excellency, The Most Reverend Paul Morgan
- District Superior of the Society of Saint Pius X in Great Britain, Ireland and Scandinavia
- Installed: 2003
- Term ended: 2013
- Successor: Robert Brucciani

Orders
- Ordination: 29 June 1988 by Marcel Lefebvre
- Consecration: 14 February 2022 by Richard Williamson

Personal details
- Born: Paul Morgan; 11 August 1963 (age 63)
- Denomination: Traditionalist Catholic

Paul William Morgan (born 11 August 1963) is a Traditionalist Catholic Episcopus vagans and the former superior of the British district of the Society of St Pius X.

== Biography ==
Morgan was ordained by Archbishop Marcel Lefebvre at Écône on 29 June 1988. He has served in the United States and the Philippines, served as Principal of St. Michael's, the Society's school, and was Superior of the SSPX in Great Britain between 2003 and 2015. He is the son of William J. Morgan, a lay theologian who was an advocate of the sedevacantist theory. He is strongly opposed to the Second Vatican Council which he claims contain "modernist errors".

Morgan vociferously opposed the decision of the small traditionalist community known as the Transalpine Redemptorists (who had previously been associated with the Society of St. Pius X) to reconcile with the Vatican. Morgan is also opposed to any reconciliation by the SSPX with Rome, until they repudiate what he sees as their errors.

In a 2017 interview, Morgan left the Society of St. Pius X and defended episcopal ordinations by Bishop Richard Williamson. Five years later, Paul William Morgan was consecrated a bishop on 14 February 2022 in Cork by Bishop Williamson. The co-consecrator was Bishop Giacomo Ballini, an Italian. Bishop Morgan celebrated his first Pontifical High Mass on 6 August 2023 in England.

On 26 February 2025, Morgan offered the pontifical requiem mass for Bishop Williamson in Canterbury. Morgan delievered a sermon and eulogy and also read a letter from Archbishop Carlo Maria Viganò. Following Williamson's death, he took over the pastoral and sacramental duties, maintaining the Regina Martyrum House as an active base for their breakaway traditionalist network.
