= Vincent's Club =

Private members' club in Oxford

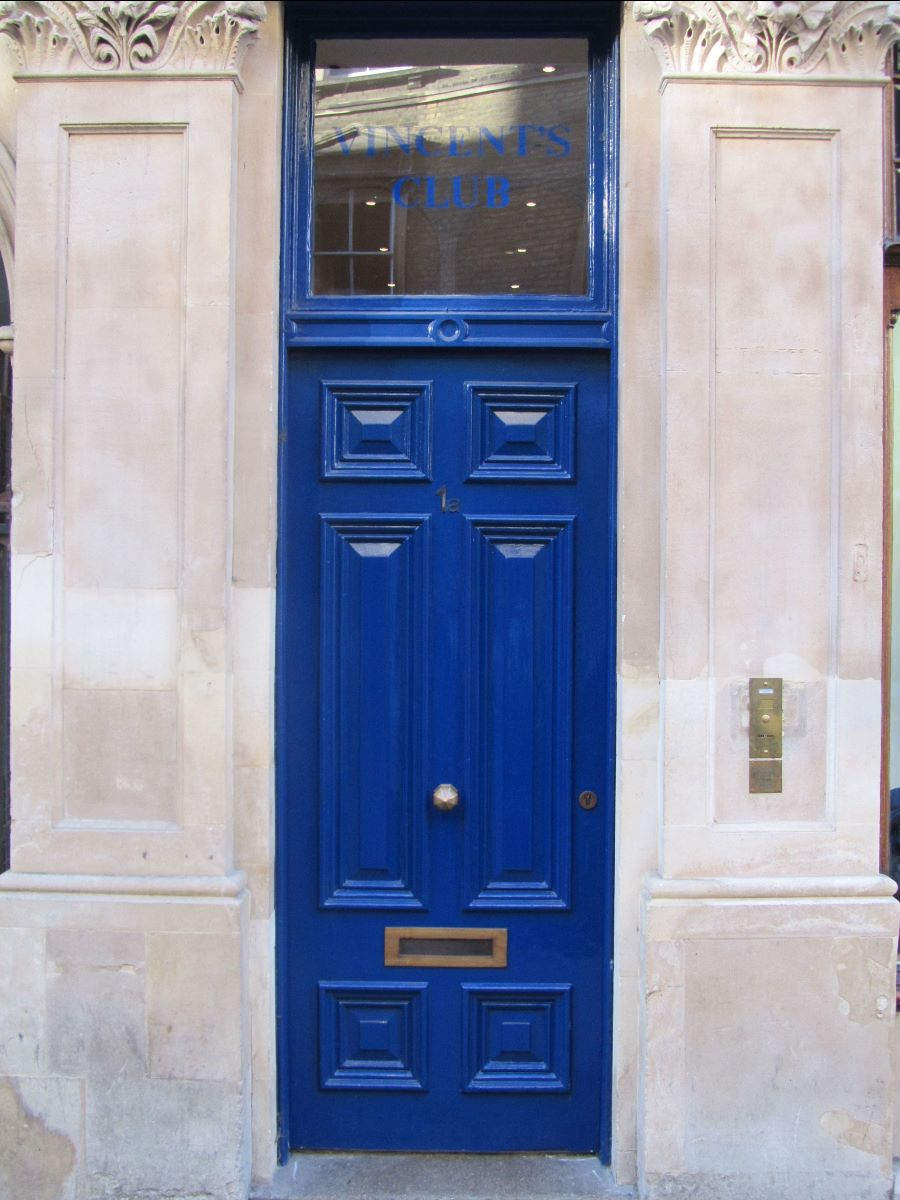
- The front door of Vincent's Club
- Formation: 1863
- Location: 1A King Edward Street
- Coordinates: 51.7522°N 1.2549°W
- Members: Oxford Blues (predominantly)
- President: Isla Finlay
- Website: www.vincents.org

Vincent's Club, popularly known as Vinnie's, is a private members' club in Oxford. The club's membership consists predominantly, but not exclusively, of sporting blues of the University of Oxford.

== History ==
Vincent's Club was founded in 1863 by oarsman Walter Bradford Woodgate of Brasenose College, Oxford, who became the first president of the club. Dissatisfied with the permissive admission policies and lack of refreshments at the Oxford Union, Woodgate established his own club and stated that it "should consist of the picked hundred of the University, selected for all-round qualities; social, physical and intellectual qualities being duly considered."

Vincent's Club quickly gained considerable prestige, which it enjoys to this day. J.S.G. Pemberton regarded it as "the premier Social Club of the University", while in 1894 The Isis could describe Vincent's as "a sacred Temple ... to those whom, by virtue of themselves, their athletic powers, and their social and general good-fellowship, a grateful University delighteth to honour", with membership considered to be "the diploma which the University of Undergraduates grants in due season to her most successful and deserving sons".

Roger Bannister, president of the club in 1950, celebrated at Vincent's after running the world's first sub-four-minute mile at the Iffley Road track in 1954. The Beatles visited the club in 1964.

== Membership ==
From the club's foundation, influenced by Woodgate's own sporting interests, the membership has been dominated by sportspeople. However, there has never been a sporting qualification for membership and membership does not accompany a Blue. The club was originally limited to only 100 resident members, but this has since increased.

Members must be enrolled at the University of Oxford at the time of their election, but remain members for life. The club's constitution was amended to enable the admission of women as members on 9 March 2016.

== Clubhouse ==
The club was originally located in the old reading rooms which J. H. Vincent, a printer, had previously kept at 90 High Street. Between 1894 and 1931, the club occupied premises at 6-7 High Street.

Since 1931, the club has been located at 1A King Edward Street, in upstairs premises above Shepherd & Woodward on the High Street in central Oxford. Refurbished in 2014, the club's facilities include a bar, lounge area, dining room, conference room, kitchen, and office.

== Club regalia ==
Vincent’s members are entitled to wear the club tie, which is dark blue with a white crown motif, or a silver crown lapel pin. The club tie was adopted in 1926.

== Notable members ==
Royalty:

- King Edward VII of the United Kingdom
- King Edward VIII of the United Kingdom
- King Harald V of Norway, world champion sailor
- King Olav V of Norway, Olympic Gold 1928
- Nawab Iftikhar Ali Khan of Pataudi, Indian prince, India cricket captain and England cricket international
- Emperor Naruhito of Japan (Honorary Member)

Politics & Law:

- Tony Abbott, Prime Minister of Australia
- Sir George Abell, civil servant
- Sir Anthony Acland, British diplomat and Provost of Eton College
- Michael Beloff KC, barrister and President of Trinity College, Oxford
- Bill Bradley, NBA player and US Senator, Olympic Gold 1964
- Sir Robin Butler, Cabinet Secretary and Master of University College, Oxford
- Bill Cash, MP
- Randolph Churchill, MP and son of Winston Churchill
- Lord Desborough, MP, President of the Amateur Fencing Association, President of Marylebone Cricket Club and President of the Lawn Tennis Association
- Lord Curzon, Viceroy of India, Foreign Secretary and Chancellor of Oxford University
- Alec Douglas-Home, Prime Minister of the United Kingdom
- John Gorton, Prime Minister of Australia
- Roger Gifford, Lord Mayor of London
- Sir Jeremy Greenstock, diplomat
- Sir Edward Grey, UK Foreign Secretary and Chancellor of Oxford University
- Melville Guest, diplomat
- Bob Hawke, Prime Minister of Australia
- Harold Macmillan, Prime Minister of the United Kingdom (Honorary Member)
- Sir John Masterman, spymaster, Provost of Worcester College, Oxford and Vice-Chancellor of Oxford University
- Lord Milligan, Scottish judge and politician
- Colin Moynihan, Olympic Silver 1980, MP and Olympic administrator
- Viscount Monckton, lawyer and Defence Secretary
- Philip Moore, Private Secretary to Queen Elizabeth II and England rugby international
- Sir Richard Moore, Chief of the Secret Intelligence Service (MI6) and UK Ambassador to Turkey
- Airey Neave, MP and soldier
- Ossie Newton-Thompson, member of the South African parliament, England rugby international and winner of the Distinguished Flying Cross
- Lord Oaksey, lead British judge at the Nuremberg trials
- Katsuhiko Oku, diplomat
- Lord Porritt, Olympic Bronze 1924, military surgeon and Governor-General of New Zealand
- Cecil Rhodes, Prime Minister of the Cape Colony and mining magnate
- Sir Ivor Roberts, UK Ambassador to Yugoslavia, Ireland, and Italy and President of Trinity College, Oxford
- Earl of Roseberry, Prime Minister of the United Kingdom
- Sir Mark Sedwill, Cabinet Secretary and United Kingdom National Security Adviser
- Edwyn Scudamore-Stanhope, peer and courtier
- Montague Shearman, judge and co-founder of the Amateur Athletics Association
- Whitney Shepardson, head of the Secret Intelligence Branch of the Office of Strategic Services
- William Stevenson, Olympic Gold 1924, founding partner of Debevoise & Plimpton LLP, president of Oberlin College and US ambassador to the Philippines
- Frederic Thesiger, Viceroy of India, Governor of New South Wales, Governor of Queensland, First Lord of the Admiralty and Warden of All Souls College, Oxford
- Sir John Weston, diplomat

Military:

- Sir Brian Burnett, Royal Air Force air chief marshal and Chairman of the All England Lawn Tennis Club
- Robin Bourne-Taylor, British Olympic rower, Life Guards officer and winner of the Conspicuous Gallantry Cross
- Noel Chavasse VC & Bar, Olympic athlete and twice winner of the Victoria Cross
- Lord David Craig, Marshal of the Royal Air Force and Chief of the Defence Staff
- Pete Dawkins, Rhodes Scholar, Heisman Trophy winner, US Army brigadier general and business executive
- James Glancy, Royal Marines and Special Boat Service (SBS) officer, winner of the Conspicuous Gallantry Cross, wildlife conservationist, film maker and Member of the European Parliament
- Sir Douglas Haig, British Army field marshal
- Sir Edmund Herring, Australian Army lieutenant general, Lieutenant Governor of Victoria and Chief Justice of the Supreme Court of Victoria
- Jock Lewes, co-founder of the Special Air Service (SAS) and Welsh Guards officer
- Sir Tommy Macpherson, winner of three Military Crosses
- Robert Nairac, Grenadier Guards and military intelligence officer
- Sir John Rawlins, Royal Navy Surgeon Vice Admiral
- Sir Michael Rose, British Army general, commanding officer of the Special Air Service (SAS) and Commander United Nations Protection Force
- Sir Johnny Stringer, Royal Air Force air chief marshal and NATO Deputy Supreme Allied Commander Europe
- Arnold Strode-Jackson, Olympic Gold 1912 and British Army general officer
- Wilfred Thesiger, military officer, explorer and writer
- Richard Wakeford VC, winner of the Victoria Cross
- Geoffrey Woolley VC, infantry officer, military chaplain and winner of the Victoria Cross
- Melvin "Dinghy" Young, twice winner of the Distinguished Flying Cross and second in command of Operation Chastise

Academic:

- Sir John Bell, Regius Professor of Medicine at the University of Oxford
- Lord Blake, historian and Provost of The Queen's College, Oxford
- Lord Butterfield, Regius Professor of Physic at the University of Cambridge, Master of Downing College, Cambridge and Vice-Chancellor of Cambridge University
- John Dossetor, pioneering physician and bioethicist
- Sir Keith Feiling, Chichele Professor of Modern History at All Souls College, Oxford
- Robin Fletcher, Olympic Bronze 1952, Fellow of Trinity College, Oxford and Warden of Rhodes House, Oxford
- Gathorne Robert Girdlestone, pioneering orthopaedic surgeon
- Sir John Hood, businessman and Vice-Chancellor of Oxford University
- Frederick L. Hovde, president of Purdue University
- Arthur Johnson, Fellow of All Souls College, Oxford and FA Cup winner
- Sir Colin Lucas, Vice-Chancellor of Oxford University and Chair of the Board of the British Library
- Sir Terence Morrison-Scott, zoologist, Director of the Science Museum and the British Museum (Natural History)
- Francis Pember, Warden of All Souls College, Oxford and Vice-Chancellor of Oxford University
- Professor Graham Richards, head of the Department of Chemistry at Oxford University
- Felix Stephens, Benedictine monk and Master of St Benet's Hall, Oxford
- Sir Harold Thompson, Fellow of St John's College, Oxford and chairman of The FA
- Alan Valentine, Olympic Gold 1924, academic, president of the University of Rochester and Marshall Plan official
- Hugh Ward, bacteriologist and winner of the Military Cross
- Sir Francis Wylie, the first Warden of Rhodes House, Oxford

Religion:

- Walter Carey, international rugby player and Bishop of Bloemfontein
- Edward Carr Glyn, Bishop of Peterborough
- Hartwell de la Garde Grissell, papal chamberlain and founder of the Oxford University Newman Society
- William Heard, cardinal
- Cosmo Lang, Archbishop of Canterbury
- Nicholas Stacey, priest and social activist
- Andrew Wingfield Digby, sports chaplain

Business:

- Gerry Cardinale, businessman and investor
- Etienne de Villiers, investor and business executive
- Sir Rod Eddington, business executive
- Ivan Gazidis, former CEO of Arsenal F.C. and AC Milan
- Jason Gissing, founder of Ocado
- Sir Christopher Hogg, business executive
- Jim Rogers, investor and financial commentator
- Julian Ogilvie Thompson, chairman of De Beers and Anglo American
- Lord Charles Williams, business executive and life peer

Arts:

- Lord Jeffrey Archer, novelist and politician
- John Buchan, author and Governor General of Canada
- John Galsworthy, winner of the Nobel Prize in Literature
- Kris Kristofferson, Grammy Award-winning singer and Golden Globe-winning actor
- Lord Palumbo, chairman of the Arts Council of Great Britain

Media:

- James Allen, Formula 1 journalist
- Sir Christopher Bland, businessman and Chairman of the Board of Governors of the BBC
- John Bryant, editor of The Daily Telegraph and The Sunday Telegraph
- Tim Hetherington, photojournalist
- Marmaduke Hussey, Chairman of the Board of Governors of the BBC
- Walter Isaacson, author, professor, CEO of the Aspen Institute, chair of CNN and editor of Time
- Norris McWhirter, co-founder of Guinness World Records and The Freedom Association
- Ross McWhirter, co-founder of Guinness World Records
- Dan Snow, historian and broadcaster
- John Woodcock, cricket writer

Sportspeople:

- A. G. G. Asher, Scottish rugby and cricket international
- Jimmy Allan, Scottish cricket international
- David McLaren Bain, Scotland rugby captain
- Sir Roger Bannister, first to run the sub-4-minute mile, neurologist and Master of Pembroke College, Oxford
- Stuart Barnes, England rugby international and commentator
- Tommy Bedford, South Africa rugby captain
- Robin Benson, FA Cup winner, merchant banker and art collector
- Bernard Bosanquet, international cricketer and inventor of the googly
- Angus Brayshaw, Australian rules (AFL) footballer
- Marshall Brooks, England rugby international and world record holder for the high jump
- Charles Burnell, Olympic Gold 1908
- Richard Burnell, Olympic Gold 1948
- Donald Carr, England cricket international and cricket administrator
- Herbert Hayton Castens, captained South Africa at both rugby and cricket
- Christopher Chataway, athlete and politician
- Troy Coker, Australian rugby international and winner of the 1991 Rugby World Cup
- Oliver Cook, world champion rower
- Jerry Cornes, Olympic Silver 1932
- Lord Colin Cowdrey, England cricket captain, first President of the International Cricket Council and President of Marylebone Cricket Club
- Phillip Crowe, Australian rugby international
- Phil de Glanville, England rugby captain
- Barnabé Delarze, Swiss Olympic rower
- Peter Dixon, England rugby international
- Sandy Duncan, Olympic administrator
- Hugh "Jumbo" Edwards, two Olympic Golds 1932 and Royal Air Force group captain
- Mark Evans, Olympic Gold 1984
- Mike Evans, Olympic Gold 1984
- Jonathan Fellows-Smith, South African cricket international
- R. E. Foster, England cricket and football captain
- C. B. Fry, England cricket and football international, world record holder for the long jump
- Angus Groom, Olympic Silver 2020
- Simon Halliday, England rugby international
- David Hemery, Olympic Gold 1968
- Bob Hiller, England rugby international
- Ewart Horsfall, Olympic Gold 1912, winner of the Military Cross and Distinguished Flying Cross
- Malcolm Howard, Olympic Gold 2008
- Andrew "Sandy" Irvine, mountaineer
- Douglas Jardine, England cricket captain
- Manon Johnes, Wales women's rugby international
- Derek Johnson, Olympic Silver 1956
- Abdul Kardar, first Pakistan cricket captain
- F. S. Kelly, Olympic Gold 1908, musician and composer
- Alister Kirby, Olympic Gold 1912
- David Kirk, All Blacks captain and winner of the 1987 Rugby World Cup
- Ronald Lagden, England rugby international
- Chris Laidlaw, All Blacks international and politician
- H. D. G. Leveson Gower, England cricket captain
- Constantine Louloudis, Olympic Gold 2016
- Jack Lovelock, Olympic Gold 1936
- Donald MacDonald, Scottish rugby international
- Dugald MacDonald, Springboks rugby international
- Hugo MacNeill, Irish rugby international
- Phil Macpherson, Scottish rugby international
- Selwyn Maister, Olympic Gold 1976
- Nick Mallett, South African rugby international and coach
- Craig Masback, American middle distance runner, commentator and business executive
- Alan Melville, South African cricket international
- Adrian Metcalfe, Olympic Silver 1964 and commentator
- Brendan Mullin, Irish rugby international
- Patrick Munro, Scottish rugby international and politician
- Thomas Nelson, Scottish rugby international
- Charles Nepean, FA Cup winner
- Guy Nickalls, Olympic Gold 1908
- Prince Alexander Obolensky, England rugby international
- Anton Oliver, All Blacks international
- Tiger Pataudi, India cricket captain
- Tony Pawson, cricketer, football and leading fly fisherman
- Malcolm Phillips, England rugby international and President of the Rugby Football Union
- Sir Matthew Pinsent, Olympic Golds 1992, 1996, 2000, 2004
- Rosemary Popa, Olympic Gold 2020
- William Rawson, England football international and FA Cup winner
- Pete Reed, Olympic Golds 2008, 2012, 2016 and Royal Navy officer
- Brett Robinson, Australian rugby international and Chair of World Rugby
- Joe Roff, Australian rugby international and 1991 Rugby World Cup winner
- Alan Rotherham, England rugby captain and member of the IRB Hall of Fame
- Bevil Rudd, Olympic Gold 1920 and winner of the Military Cross
- Richard Sharp, England rugby captain
- G. O. Smith, England football captain
- Brian Smith, Australia and Ireland rugby international
- M. J. K. Smith, England cricket captain and rugby international
- Peter Stagg, Scotland and Zambia rugby international
- Nigel Starmer-Smith, England rugby international
- Davis Tarwater, Olympic Gold 2012
- Cyril Tolley, British amateur golf champion
- Daniel Topolski, rowing world champion, coach and commentator
- Victor Ubogu, England rugby international
- Pieter van der Bijl, South African cricket international
- Clive van Ryneveld, South Africa cricket and England rugby international
- Harry Vassall, England rugby international
- Walpole Vidal, England football international, played in the first ever international football match and FA Cup winner
- Michael Walford, Olympic Silver 1948
- Frank Willan, rower and co-founder of the Royal Yachting Association
- John Young, England rugby international

== See also ==
- Hawks' Club, the closest equivalent members' club for sportsmen at the University of Cambridge
- University Pitt Club, private members' club open to students at the University of Cambridge
- The Gridiron Club, dining club open to students at the University of Oxford
