= Grissell =

Grissell is a surname, and may refer to:

- Hartwell de la Garde Grissell (1839–1907), papal chamberlain
- Henry Grissell (1817–883), English foundryman
- Thomas Grissell (1801–1874), English public works contractor
- Wallace Grissell (1904–1954), British film director and editor
