= Canonisation of John Henry Newman =

Declaration of Sainthood

Saint John Henry Newman
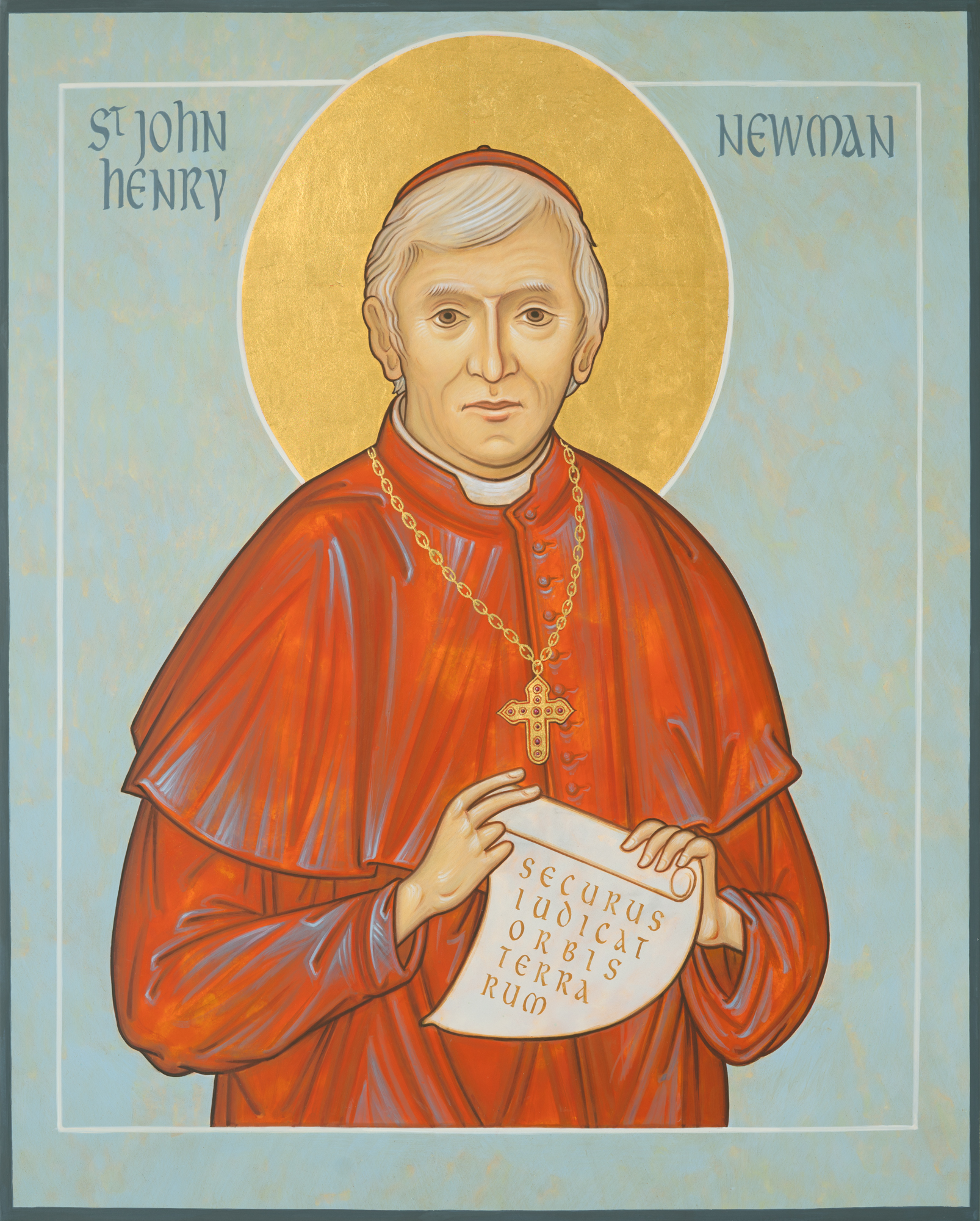
- Icon of Saint John Henry Newman written by Jacques Bihin in 2022

Priest, Confessor of the Faith, and Doctor of the Church
- Born: 21 February 1801
- Died: 11 August 1890 (aged 89)
- Venerated in: Catholic Church, Anglo-Catholicism, Anglicanism
- Beatified: 19 September 2010 by Pope Benedict XVI
- Canonized: 13 October 2019 by Pope Francis
- Major shrine: Birmingham Oratory
- Feast: 9 October
- Attributes: Cardinal's attire, Oratorian Habit
- Patronage: Personal Ordinariate of Our Lady of Walsingham

John Henry Newman (21 February 1801 – 11 August 1890) was a Roman Catholic theologian, philosopher and cardinal who converted to Roman Catholicism from Anglicanism in October 1845. In early life, he was a major figure in the Oxford Movement to bring the Church of England back to its roots. Eventually his studies in history persuaded him to become a Roman Catholic priest, and he has now become a Saint, having been canonised on 13 October 2019. In 1991, Newman was proclaimed "Venerable" by the Congregation for the Causes of Saints – the first stage in the canonisation process. He was beatified on 19 September 2010 at an open air Mass in Birmingham.

On 1 July 2019, Pope Francis announced at the Consistory of Cardinals his intention to canonise Newman. Newman was canonised by Francis on 13 October 2019, during an open-air Mass in St. Peter's Square. The Mass in 2019 was attended by Prince Charles (later King Charles III) and tens of thousands of pilgrims.

In 2025, history was made a week before Pope Leo XIV proclaimed Saint John Henry Newman a Doctor of the Church. British King Charles III prayed alongside Pope Leo XIV during the King's visit to the Vatican. This was the first time the British monarch, who is the Supreme Governor of the Church of England, and the leader of the Roman Catholic Church have prayed together in five centuries. The prayers took place in the Sistine Chapel, where Queen Camilla was also present. With the proclamation of Newman as a Doctor of the Church, Saint John Henry Newman was named co-patron of Catholic education joining St. Thomas Aquinas.

== Beatification ==
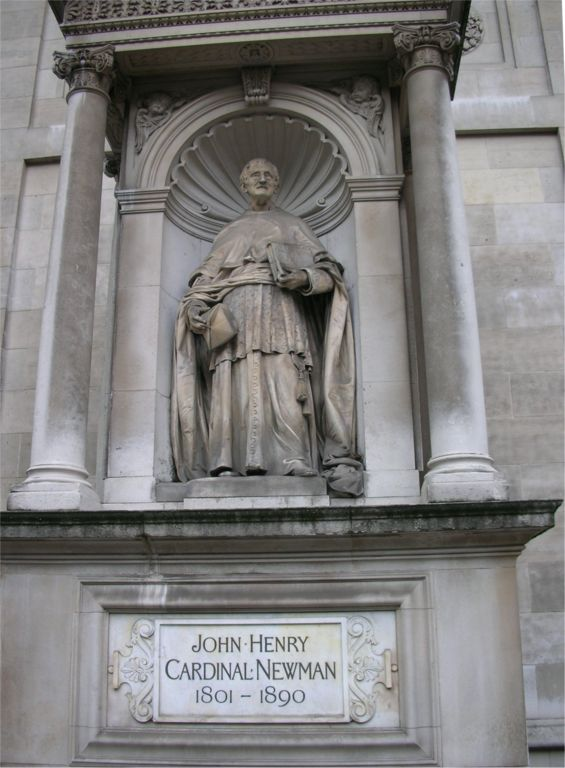
Statue outside the Church of the Immaculate Heart of Mary, popularly known as Brompton Oratory, in London

A file on Newman's beatification was first opened in 1958. In 1991, Newman was proclaimed Venerable by Pope John Paul II after an examination of his life and work by the Sacred Congregation for the Causes of Saints. One miracle attributed to Newman's intercession was required to have occurred and been fully investigated and approved by the Vatican before he could be beatified. A second miracle would then be necessary for his canonisation.

In October 2005, Paul Chavasse, provost of the Birmingham Oratory, who is the postulator responsible for the cause, announced that a miraculous cure had occurred.

Jack Sullivan, a deacon from Marshfield, Massachusetts in the United States, attributed his recovery from a spinal cord disorder to Newman. The claimed miracle occurred in the jurisdiction of the Archbishop of Boston, whose responsibility it was to determine its validity. In August 2006, the Archbishop of Boston, Sean O'Malley announced he was passing details to the Vatican.

On 24 April 2008, the press secretary to the Fathers of the Birmingham Oratory reported that the medical consultants at the Congregation for the Causes of Saints had met that day and voted unanimously that Sullivan's recovery defied any scientific or medical explanation. The question of the genuineness of the alleged miracle then went to the panel of theological consultors, who unanimously agreed to recognise the miracle a year later on 24 April 2009. The panel's vote, presumably having been verified by the prelate members of the Congregation, allowed Pope Benedict XVI to beatify Newman at a date of his choosing following a meeting with the Prefect of the Congregation for the Causes of Saints (then Archbishop Angelo Amato) to formally approve the Congregation's voting process.

On 3 July 2009, Pope Benedict XVI recognised the healing of Deacon Jack Sullivan in 2001 as a miracle, resulting from the intercession of the Venerable Servant of God, John Henry Newman. This decision paved the way for Newman's beatification, which occurred on 19 September 2010. Pope Benedict said that Newman "tells us that our divine Master has assigned a specific task to each one of us, a 'definite service', committed uniquely to every single person."

Although it had been originally announced that Newman would be beatified at an open air Mass at Coventry Airport, the venue was later switched to Cofton Park in Longbridge. Thus it was during the first Papal state visit to the UK that Pope Benedict XVI himself performed the beatification on 19 September 2010.

== Steps towards canonisation ==
Chavasse expanded on his remarks at the Michaelmas 2006 Dinner of the Oxford University Newman Society (held in November), suggesting that Benedict XVI had shown a personal interest in Newman's cause.

A second miracle was needed for Newman's canonisation. In November 2018, the Vatican approved a second miracle, involving the unexplained healing of a pregnant American woman from a life-threatening diagnosis and investigated by the Archdiocese of Chicago. On 13 February 2019, it was announced that Pope Francis had approved the Decree concerning this miracle, and Newman's canonisation took place in Rome on 13 October 2019.

== Movement of remains ==
In 2008, the Vatican decided to enact plans to move Newman's remains from The Lickey Hills, near Rednal, Worcestershire where he was buried, to the Oratory in Birmingham city centre in anticipation of his being declared a saint. The move required prior permission from the Ministry of Justice; in preparation the area was enclosed by steel fencing incorporating The Oratory country house, a mortuary chapel and a small graveyard which contained his shared grave (with Ambrose St. John).

The planned exhumation and move of Newman's remains were finally agreed by the UK authorities as a special case, as UK law prohibits the removal of a body from a graveyard to a church tomb. Licence was finally granted on 11 August 2008, the 118th anniversary of Newman's death in 1890, to permit the move by undertakers.

Newman's grave at Rednal was opened on 2 October 2008. It had been hoped that his body had been buried in a lead coffin and would be well preserved. However, the exhumation revealed that Newman had been buried in a wooden coffin and his body had completely decomposed; there were no human remains. The only artefacts retrieved, including an inscription plate, were wooden, brass and cloth. These artefacts, along with locks of hair, which had been sent to Sullivan before his inexplicable cure (and had always been in the possession of the Birmingham Oratory), were placed in a glass sided casket for a Vigil of Reception. The relics were then solemnly placed in the Chapel of St Charles Borromeo situated to the right of the Sanctuary. They will rest in the Chapel while the process of Beatification continues in Rome. The Fathers of the Birmingham Oratory have decided that the specially made green Italian marble sarcophagus will not be placed between the columns opposite the Holy Souls' Altar in the Oratory Church, Birmingham as originally planned.

The proposed movement of Newman's body angered some gay rights campaigners, who saw it as an attempt to deliberately separate him from Ambrose St John, with whom he was buried in accordance with his personal wishes. In their view, this was to deliberately downplay the intense nature of the relationship between the two men, who had lived and worked together for 30 years. Peter Tatchell entered the debate in an article in The Times on 19 August 2008, accusing the Vatican of "moral vandalism", and renewed his criticisms on the Sunday programme on BBC Radio 4 on 24 August 2008.

Tatchell went on to criticise the Home Office of collusion with the Vatican. He claimed that the Roman Catholic Church had "put the government under sustained pressure" to obtain the authorisation to exhume the body. Nevertheless, Ker and Paul Chavasse, the then Provost of the Birmingham Oratory, maintain that Newman would have been glad to submit to the wishes of the Vatican in whatever they asked, no matter his previous wishes.

== See also ==
- Catholic Church in the United Kingdom
