= Christopher Ferrara =

American lawyer (born 1952)

- Born: Christopher A. Ferrara; January 6, 1952 (age 74); New York City, U.S.
- Education: Fordham University (BA, JD)
- Occupations: Lawyer; anti-abortion activist; writer
- Movement: Traditionalist Catholicism, Traditionalist Conservatism, Paleoconservatism

Christopher A. Ferrara (born January 6, 1952) is an American Roman Catholic lawyer, anti-abortion activist, political pundit, and writer. He is the founder and president of the American Catholic Lawyers Association. He is also a regular columnist of The Remnant, a traditionalist Catholic newspaper.

In 2017, he signed a document along with a number of other clergy and academics labeled as a "Filial Correction" of Pope Francis.

== Life and legal career ==
Ferrara was born on January 6, 1952, in New York City. He holds a Bachelor of Arts degree from Fordham University and a Juris Doctor degree from Fordham University School of Law. He engaged in general legal practice in both New Jersey and New York between 1977 and 1991. After founding the American Catholic Lawyers Association in 1990, he focused on pro-bono legal work representing Catholics as well as anti-abortion activists.

On October 23, 2012, Ferrara, along with Nicholas Gruner, appeared at the headquarters of the European Union in Strasbourg, France, to speak at a press conference in support of a motion for a declaration by the EU Parliament calling upon Pope Benedict XVI to carry out the Consecration of Russia to the Immaculate Heart of Mary. Ferrara and Gruner were invited to speak by the sponsors of the motion, MEPs Mario Borghezio and Lorenzo Fontana.

== Writing ==
Ferrara writes articles on Catholic issues in various traditionalist Catholic publications, as well as other media. Currently, he is a regular columnist for The Remnant.

Ferrara is also an author of a number of published books which have been widely read and commented upon by conservative, especially traditionalist, Catholics. With reference to Ferrara's book The Secret Still Hidden, the editor of Inside the Vatican magazine stated in an article he published that Archbishop Pietro Sambi, Apostolic Nuncio to the United States, indicated in conversation with him: "Do you know this book, you should read it. ... there are interesting things worth reading in this book. And in the end, we are all after the truth, aren't we? The truth is the important thing..."

Ferrara's literary contributions and anti-abortion advocacy have led to his being cited by major media outlets as a spokesperson for the traditionalist Catholic position within the Catholic Church. He has been interviewed by NBC regarding Pope Francis; participated as an expert in a panel discussion hosted by the BBC; and has made a number of appearances on Mike Church's conservative talk show on Sirius Satellite Radio.

Ferrara is an outspoken critic of Holocaust denial and considers it a distortion of historical fact.

Ferrara criticizes John Locke and his philosophical principles.

It isn't that Locke was an original thinker, he was rather a kind of collector and systematizer of various errors and nonsensical propositions, which he had the gift of making sound plausible and conservative ... For Locke, we know nothing of reality except our ideas of it, which are representations of the real world. The validity of knowledge with Locke is no longer presumed.

== Reception ==
In responding to criticism from Remnant editor Michael Matt and Ferrara of a Catholic Answers Live presentation that distinguished between "traditional Catholicism" and "radical Traditionalism", Catholic Answers founder Karl Keating wrote that "Matt and Ferrara shoehorn their opponents into taking positions that they don't in fact take and into saying things they don't in fact say."

Heidi Bierich, writing in the Southern Poverty Law Center's Intelligence Report, called Ferrara's book The Great Facade, co-authored with Thomas Woods, one of the "Two Treatises" of the "radical Traditionalist movement" and opined that The Great Façade "attacks 'Judaized, semi-gnostic' sects [referring to the controversial Neocatechumenal Way] said to be deforming the church through their ecumenical events," cites an antisemitic tract, The Permanent Instruction of the Alta Vendita, and criticizes changes made in 1964 to the Mass to excise the words, "We pray for the perfidious Jews." However, The Permanent Instruction of the Alta Vendita makes no reference to either Jews or Judaism in general, but only to Freemasonic initiatives within the Catholic Church; for which reason, popes Pius IX and Leo XIII requested that it be published and widely distributed.

In response to Bierich's suggestion of antisemitism, Rabbi Mayer Schiller, author of two books on Judaism and a Talmudic studies instructor at Yeshiva University, stated: "Unfounded charges of anti-Jewish sentiments not only malign the innocent. They also create a 'boy who cried wolf' syndrome, in that they may well render society insensitive to real bigotry when it does come along. I have known Chris Ferrara and Michael Matt for many years. The notion that they hate Jews is so absurd as to be beneath contempt." Ferrara's own response to the SPLC's allegation was: "The Left has long used false allegations of 'anti-Semitism' to distract and discredit its opponents, especially Catholics." Ferrara noted "Hatred of Jews by Christians" is a "mortal sin" forbidden by the Catholic religion.

Bierich reported that by 2005 co-author Thomas Woods had cut his ties to Ferrara and said he had "spent the past 18 months trying to mend fences with people we attacked in The Great Façade." Woods said he had "no interest in being involved in a 'traditionalist movement' that permits no disagreement even on matters not strictly of faith," adding that he would not "work toward the establishment of a Catholic monarchy in the U.S."

Ferrara and Woods (who went on to write How the Catholic Church Built Western Civilization) had a further falling out in 2010 in the area of economics and Church teaching, with Ferrara writing a book entitled The Church and the Libertarian, responding to Woods's criticism of Catholic social teaching in the Church and the Market. In response to an open letter which Ferrara wrote to Woods, Woods commented, "Chris is a talented wordsmith, which gives his bulls of excommunication their plausibility, but not particularly bright or well read." Responding to Woods's public criticisms, Ferrara replied, in an interview with The Remnant:

Tom seems to think he is entitled to be one of the leaders of a movement against the Church's Social Teaching, writing entire books against it, and then insulate himself from criticism by demonizing all his opponents. ...

Rather than answer serious objections to his position, Tom insists on dismissing me and a veritable battalion of other Catholic critics. ...

One cannot expect to be taken seriously as an intellectual if he erupts in tantrums and hurls insults at his critics instead of seriously addressing their objections.

Other sources have favorably reviewed Ferrara's The Church and The Libertarian. England's largest Catholic newspaper, The Catholic Herald, called it "a spirited and well-researched work in defence of the traditional social teaching of the Church", and "a fine exposition of Catholic social teaching... a convincing refutation of the libertarian position", with "politically incorrect gems" that are "a joy to read." Dale Ahlquist of Ignatius Press named it one of "The Best Books I Read in 2010...".

Thomas Storck wrote in the New Oxford Review: "His book is a timely contribution to the understanding of both Catholic teaching and its Austrian counterfeit. Any Catholic, especially any American Catholic, would profit from reading and studying it. The appeal of Austrian economics to ill-informed Catholics is such that the strong medicine of Ferrara is more than welcome, and will prove, one hopes, equally efficacious."

In another review in Crisis magazine, Christopher Shannon wrote that Liberty, The God That Failed is an "important and timely new book", and that "If Catholics are to be truly Catholic in America, and not just a branch office of the Church of Liberty, we need to first stand apart from a political tradition born in a revolt against the Catholic Church. Christopher Ferrara's book is an essential starting point and a necessary declaration of Catholic independence." In the same review Shannon also observed:

Lacking an account of the local customs, laws and traditions that structured life in the early republic, his account threatens to keep the whole debate within the false libertarian dichotomy of individual freedom and state coercion.

So too, in an effort to demolish the libertarian myth, Ferrara often loses all sense of degree and proportion. ...

The history of liberty in America is more complex than Ferrara presents. He ignores many countervailing traditions that did, for a time, help to slow the "progress" of liberty. Still, his history is selective with a purpose, and a noble one. Any honest look at American history will show that negative liberty, "freedom from," has consistently triumphed in its battle against positive conceptions of human flourishing and the common good. It will also show that there is nothing in our quasi-Masonic public religion, from Washington and Lincoln to Ronald Reagan, which could have prevented this development. Catholics can work with the American system, but they first must realize what it is.

Stephen Masty, senior contributor at The Imaginative Conservative and speechwriter for three US presidents, wrote that Liberty, the God That Failed "exposes the studiously-ignored, anti-religious fervour of Hobbes and Locke, showing how both predicted the excesses of modern left-liberalism, and how such ideological decadence is the logical conclusion to the virtue-free, Godless experiment stretching from the Restoration to the Enlightenment, from Masonic lodges to the French Revolution to America's Founders, its Civil War, imperialism, materialism and modern government-led oppression at home."

Ryan Grant of the Distributist Review wrote: "Liberty: the God That Failed is a book that delivers, and delivers, and delivers. Page after page, the book is a powerful challenge to the Enlightenment, American social order—drawn from primary sources, legal precedent, and plain common sense. Love it or hate it, this is a work that will remain a perennial challenge to the anti-Christian principles of the Enlightenment, so ensconced in U.S. history."

== Personal life ==
Ferrara is married and has six children. He has been a traditionalist Catholic for the past 30 years. Ferrara has related how his journey to the Catholic faith took a detour through Woodstock.

== Bibliography ==
- The Secret Still Hidden (2000) ISBN 1-890740-10-1
- The Great Façade: Vatican II and the Regime of Novelty in the Catholic Church (co-authored with Thomas Woods 2002) ISBN 978-0-9815357-0-8
- The New Rosary (2005) ISBN 978-1-890740-14-6
- EWTN: A Network Gone Wrong (2008) ISBN 978-0-9663046-7-1
- The Church and the Libertarian: A Defense of the Catholic Church's Teaching on Man, Economy, and State (2010) ISBN 978-1890740160 OCLC 670143508
- Liberty, the God That Failed: Policing the Sacred and Constructing the Myths of the Secular State, from Locke to Obama (Tacoma, Washington: Angelico Press: 2012)
- The Great Façade: The Regime of Novelty in the Catholic Church from Vatican II to the Francis Revolution (2nd ed.) (Tacoma, Washington: Angelico Press: 2015)
