= List of Newman Societies =

This is a comprehensive list of Newman Societies around the world

== Australia ==
University of Queensland and Charles Sturt University both house Newman Centres.

== Canada ==
See Canadian Newman Centres

== United Kingdom ==
Oxford University Newman Society

== United States ==
http://www.newmanconnection.com/locations/find
