= The Remnant (newspaper) =

Traditionalist Catholic newspaper

- Type: Biweekly newspaper
- Owner(s): The Remnant, Inc.
- Founder: Walter Matt
- Editor: Michael Matt
- Political alignment: Traditionalist Catholicism; Pre-conciliar Catholic social teaching Traditionalist conservatism
- Headquarters: Forest Lake, Minnesota
- ISSN: 0274-9726
- Website: www.remnantnewspaper.com

The Remnant is a Traditionalist Catholic newspaper published twice a month in the United States. Founded in 1967, it is the oldest Traditionalist Catholic newspaper in the United States.

== History ==
The Remnant traces its roots back to The Wanderer, the "parent paper" of The Remnant and the oldest Catholic weekly newspaper in the United States. The Remnant was a result of a dispute between Walter Matt, the editor of The Wanderer who served the paper for over thirty years, and his brother Alphonse Matt. Walter Matt opposed the changes within the Catholic Church after the Second Vatican Council; Alphonse Matt supported them.

Walter Matt left The Wanderer, which remained under Alphonse, to start The Remnant in 1967. The paper has described itself as the flagship of the traditional Catholic movement in the United States.

The Remnant is now edited by Walter Matt's youngest son, Michael J. Matt. Notable traditionalists who have written for the paper include Thomas Woods, Christopher Ferrara, John C. Rao, and Michael Davies.

From 2005 to 2013, The Remnant was a defender of the pontificate of Benedict XVI as its writers believe he has vindicated them on issues that have divided them from other Traditionalists and from conservative Catholics associated with The Wanderer, EWTN, Church Militant and Catholic Answers.

After producing daily video updates from Rome after the resignation of Pope Benedict XVI and the conclave which ultimately elected Pope Francis, The Remnant began producing video commentary and events coverage under the title of Remnant TV. Remnant TV releases weekly talk show-styled YouTube videos in three series: Remnant TV Forum, Remnant Special Report, and The Remnant Underground. Michael Matt is the host and principal commentator; regular guests include contributors to The Remnant, and other Catholic commentators.

Although its editors are not affiliated with any particular institute or traditionalist group, the paper is sympathetic to Archbishop Marcel Lefebvre and the Society of St. Pius X. The Southern Poverty Law Center organization lists Remnant Press as a radical traditional Catholic hate group.

The Remnant claims to adhere to Catholic teaching in every aspect of its journalism. The name The Remnant is a reference to the remnant of Isaiah, and the belief that only a remnant of Catholics holding to traditional teachings and practices of the Church will remain after the sweeping changes brought by the Second Vatican Council.

The Remnant has hosted and organized tours and pilgrimages to the Holy Land and throughout Europe under the name "Remnant Tours". It has also organized the United States Chapter of the three-day Pilgrimage to Chartres, a seventy-mile walking pilgrimage from Paris to Chartres Cathedral done during Pentecost weekend.

== Positions ==
Catholic apologist Dave Armstrong has described The Remnant as "radical Catholic reactionary."

The Southern Poverty Law Center have listed The Remnant and The Remnant Press as a Radical Traditionalist Catholic hate group, which the SPLC defines as "organizations that embrace anti-Semitism and whose theology is typically rejected by the Vatican and mainstream Catholics in general. " The editors reject this label.
