= Correctio filialis de haeresibus propagatis =

2017 petition to Pope Francis

Correctio filialis de haeresibus propagatis ('Filial correction concerning propagated heresies') is an August 11, 2017, petition initially by 62 critics of Pope Francis, who argued that the pope propagated heresies, with regard to seven theological issues the authors identified in Amoris laetitia, an apostolic exhortation by Pope Francis dated March 29, 2016, and in other related statements. The authors released the twenty-five page document to the public on September 24, 2017, stating they had received no response from the Holy See.

== Summary ==
The seven corrections of doctrines and practices concerned:

1. the assertion that God's grace is not invariably sufficient for the justified person's ability to remain free from all serious sin.
2. the possibility of individuals' civil divorce and remarriage to another, and subsequently living as if married, but not placing themselves in a state of mortal sin as a result.
3. the ability to possess full knowledge of a divine law, yet voluntarily break it in a serious matter without placing oneself in a state of mortal sin as a result.
4. the ability to sin against God by keeping a divine prohibition.
5. the possibility of morally sanctioned sexual acts within a civil marriage, when one or both parties are within a sacramental marriage to another.
6. the assertion that revealed divine law or natural law principles do not absolutely prohibit some behaviors as objectively grave and unlawful.
7. providing absolution to individuals divorced and remarried absent their contrition and providing them the Eucharist.

== Notable signatories ==
Those that signed the document include:

- Bernard Fellay – then Superior General of the Society of Saint Pius X;
- Andrew Pinsent – Research Director of the Ian Ramsey Centre for Science and Religion at the University of Oxford;
- John-Henry Westen – former candidate for the New Reform Party of Ontario;
- Martin Mayer – writer;
- Gerard J. M. van den Aardweg – European editor of the Empirical Journal of Same-Sex Sexual Behavior and member of the NARTH Scientific Advisory Committee;
- Robert Brucciani – District Superior of Great Britain & Scandinavia, Society of Saint Pius X;
- Christopher Ferrara Esq. – founding President of the American Catholic Lawyers' Association;
- Ettore Gotti Tedeschi – former President of the Institute for the Works of Religion (IOR), Professor of Ethics at the Catholic University of the Sacred Heart, Milan;
- Martin Mosebach – writer and essayist;
- John Rao – Associate Professor of History, St. John's University, NYC; chairman, Roman Forum; and
- Joseph Shaw – tutor in moral philosophy, St Benet's Hall, Oxford.

== Reactions ==
Vatican secretary of state Cardinal Pietro Parolin indirectly addressed the controversy, advocating for those who disagree with the Pope to dialog with the church and "find ways to understand one another."

Mariano Fazio, the vicar general of Opus Dei, said that issuance of such a correction was wrong, and that the signers "scandalize the whole Church".
