= Oxford Oratory =

Catholic church in Oxford, England

- Oxford Oratory Church of St Aloysius Gonzaga
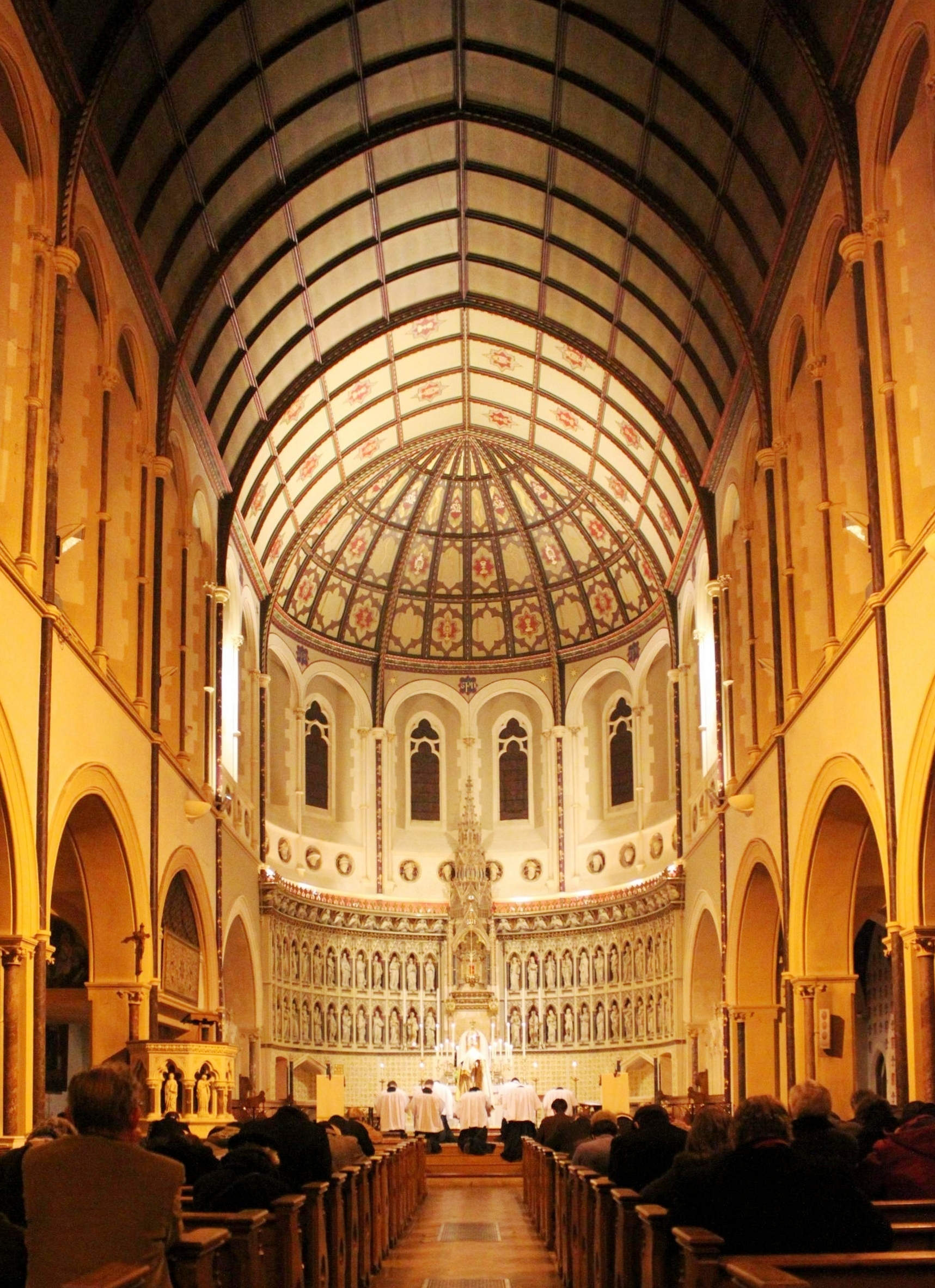
- Oxford Oratory
- Oxford Oratory
- 51.759343°N 1.261763°W
- OS grid reference: SP 51049 07002
- Location: Oxford
- Country: England
- Denomination: Catholic Church
- Religious order: Oratorians; (formerly Jesuits)
- Website: oxfordoratory.org.uk

History
- Dedication: Aloysius Gonzaga

Architecture
- Heritage designation: Grade II listed
- Architect: Joseph Hansom
- Completed: 1875

Administration
- Archdiocese: Birmingham

The Oxford Oratory Church of St Aloysius Gonzaga (or Oxford Oratory for short) is the Catholic parish church for the centre of Oxford, England. It is located at 25 Woodstock Road, next to Somerville College. The church is served by the Congregation of the Oratory.

== History ==
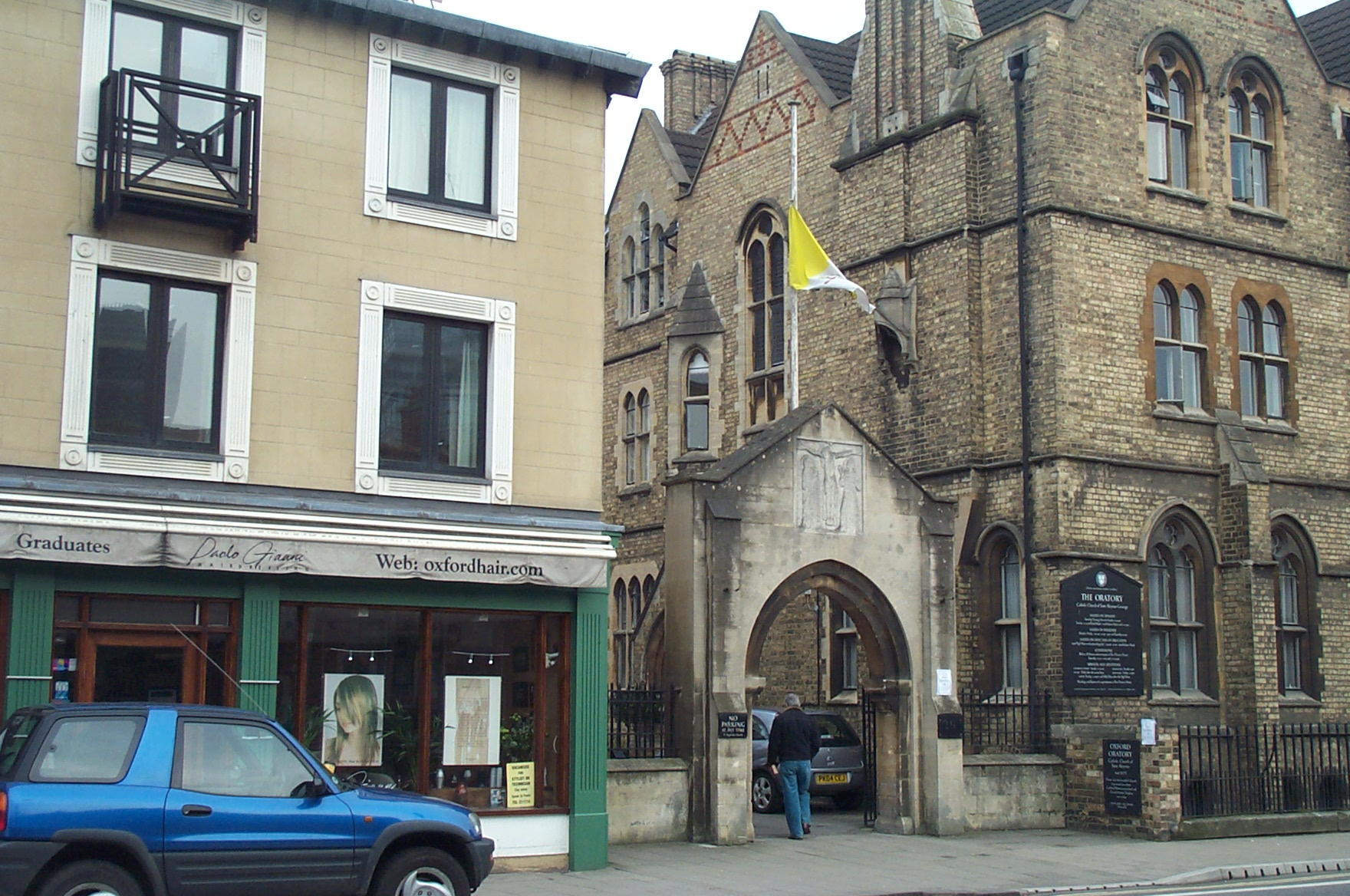
The entrance to the Oratory Church of St Aloysius Gonzaga (with the flag of Vatican City flying at half mast the day after the death of Pope John Paul II)

St Aloysius' was founded as the Jesuit (Society of Jesus) parish of central Oxford. The building was funded by £7,000 donated by the Catholic convert Baroness Weld. Completed in 1875, the building of St Aloysius' was an important step in the ongoing refoundation of a Roman Catholic presence in Oxford. The parish was served by notable members of the society for many years, including Gerard Manley Hopkins (December 1878 – September 1879). The church also housed a notable collection of relics bequeathed by Hartwell de la Garde Grissell, many of which were destroyed in the 1970s.

In the 1980s, the Jesuits left the church and the parish was taken over by the Archdiocese of Birmingham. In 1990, the Archbishop of Birmingham invited members of the Birmingham Oratory to take over the running of the parish and found a new Oratorian community in Oxford. Two priests from Birmingham arrived in September 1990 and, in 1993, the Oxford Oratory was established as an independent Congregation. Fr Robert Byrne then served as provost from 1993 to 2011. From 2011 to 2019, Fr Daniel Seward served as provost. The incumbent is the Very Rev. Fr Nicholas Edmonds-Smith.

== Liturgy ==
It is part of the tradition of the Oratory in England to ensure that the liturgy is celebrated in a dignified and worthy manner. In the Oxford Oratory most Masses are celebrated in English, but on Sundays and Holydays a non-Tridentine Solemn Mass is sung in Latin. Latin is also used in the Tridentine Low Mass also celebrated on Sundays and Holydays, while the Parish Mass is sung in English.

== Organ ==
The organ was enlarged between 1998 and 2004 by Matthew Copley. A specification of the organ can be found on the National Pipe Organ Register.

== Building ==
The church was designed by Joseph Hansom in a Gothic Revival style. Much of the original interior decoration was painted over in the 1970s, and the altar moved forward. The building is being gradually restored as part of the Oratory's "Reaffirmation and Renewal" campaign, which commenced fundraising in 2007. Two 'lost' murals by Gabriel Pippet were restored in 2024 by Cliveden Conservation.

The church consists of a single nave and five side chapels. To the left of the sanctuary is the Sacred Heart chapel, and the Lady Chapel is to the right. There are also chapels dedicated to St Philip Neri (formerly St Joseph's chapel) and Our Lady of Oxford (also known as the relic chapel). A shrine dedicated to St John Henry Newman after his beatification was established in 2010, and there are plans to build a new baptistery.

== Gallery ==
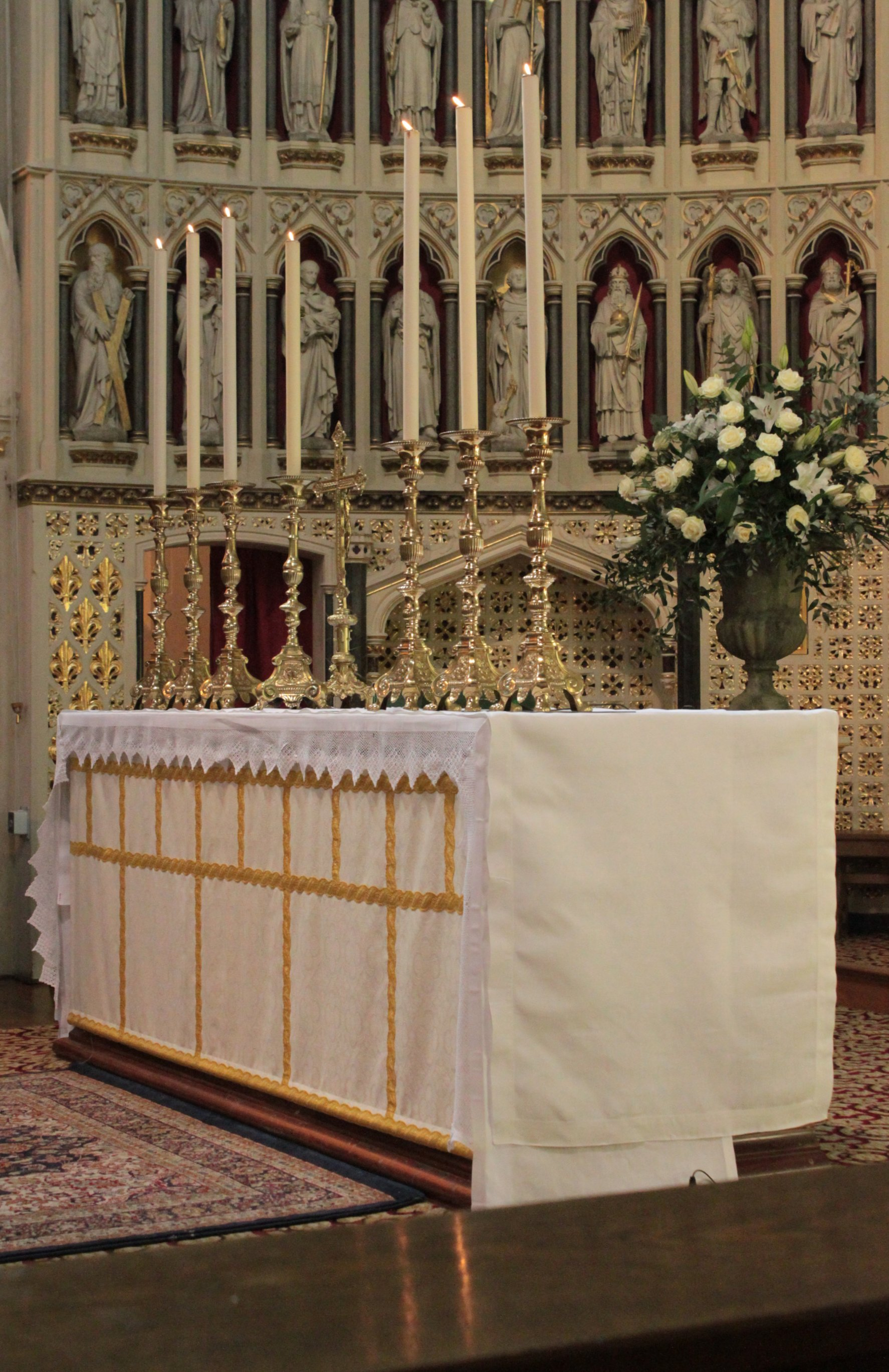
Church altar

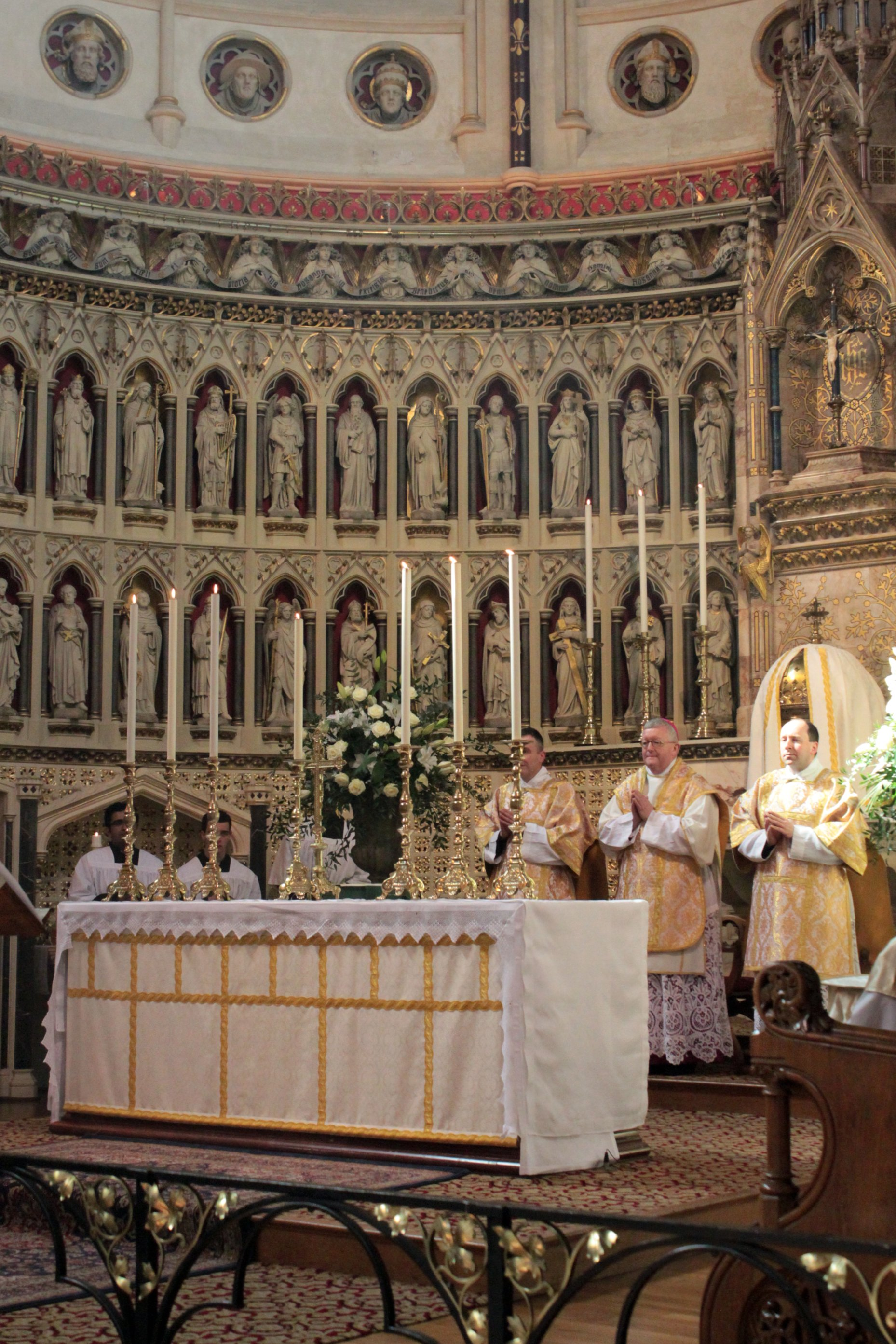
Church sanctuary

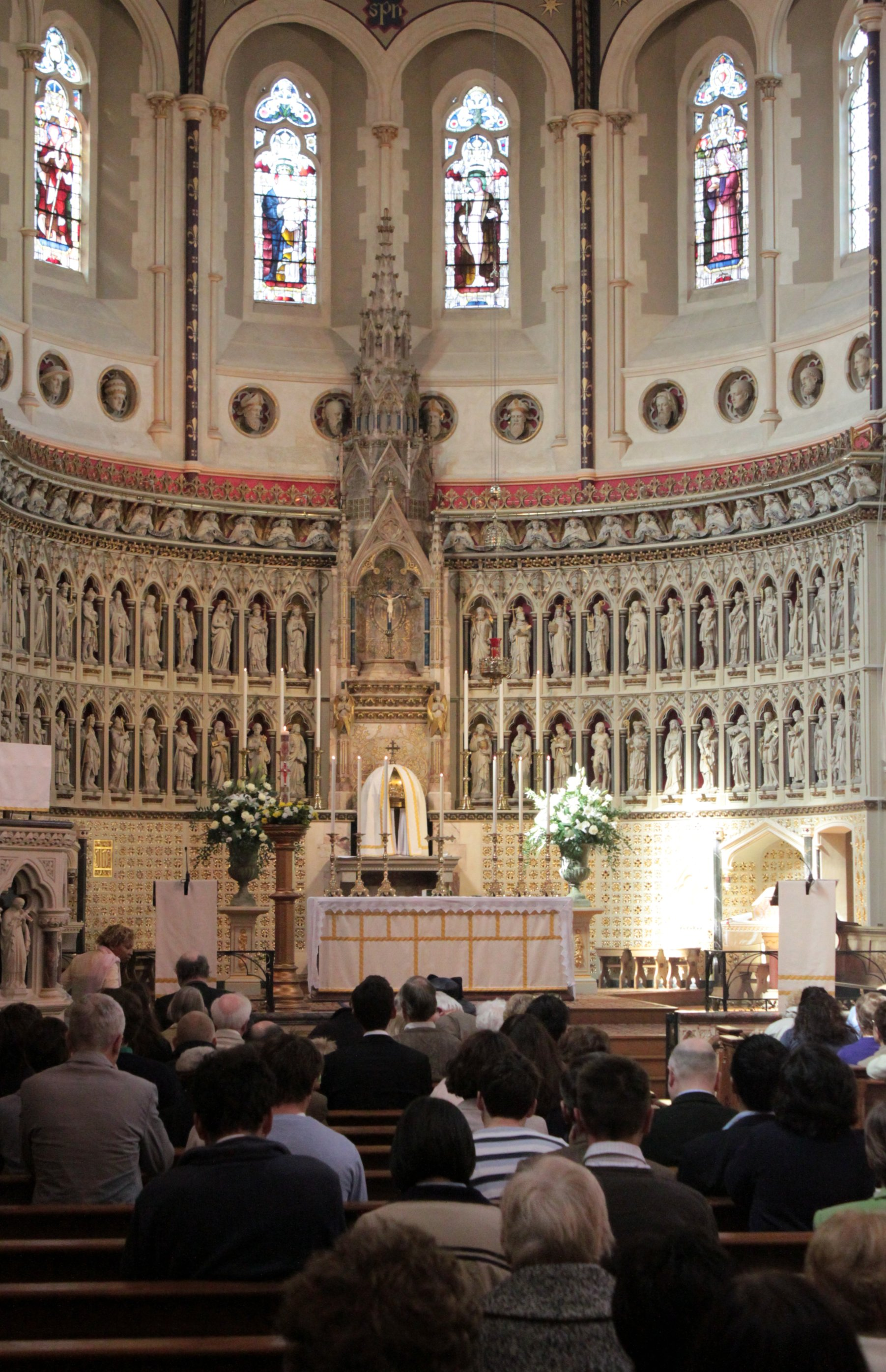
View of the altar

== See also ==
- List of Jesuit sites
