= Nicholas Gruner =

Roman Catholic priest

Fr Nicholas Nightingale Gruner (May 4, 1942 – April 29, 2015) was a Roman Catholic priest and a promoter of the message of Our Lady of Fátima, a recognized apparition of the Blessed Virgin Mary at Fátima, Portugal, in 1917. Father Gruner's interpretation of that message at times proved controversial, even among other groups of Traditionalist Catholics. In 1978, he founded the Fatima Crusaders (known today as The Fatima Center) and was its International Director.

== Biography ==
The fifth of seven children, Father Gruner was born in Montreal, Quebec, to Malcolm and Jessie (née Mullally) Gruner. He graduated from McGill University and obtained a post-graduate degree in theology from the Pontifical University of Saint Thomas Aquinas in Rome. He was ordained at Avellino, Italy on August 22, 1976, by Bishop Pasquale Venezia.

In 1978, he launched a periodical, the Fatima Crusader, dedicated to Our Lady of Fatima, which was at first a journal dedicated to praying the rosary. In the early 1980s the Fatima Crusader began to focus more on Gruner's interpretation of the message of Our Lady of Fatima, particularly regarding the consecration of Russia.

Fr Gruner started a radio and television ministry for his viewpoint. By the early 1990s Gruner's media advocacy had resulted in increased membership with claims of four hundred thousand members. Going forward the Crusader continued to argue for the consecration of Russia and maintained that such action was increasingly urgent. In his later years Gruner aligned himself with Catholic traditionalists who maintain that the documents of Vatican II are pastoral, had resulted in failure and should be reversed.

Fr Gruner died on the night of April 29, 2015, of a sudden heart attack while working in his Fatima Center office in Fort Erie, Ontario.

== The Fatima Crusader ==
Fr Gruner and his magazine, Fatima Crusader, took a critical stance toward the compliance of the popes with the message of Fatima, specifically the request for the consecration of Russia. Throughout the 1980s, the Fatima Crusader made repeated allegations that the Vatican had been infiltrated and subverted, and that the Soviet Union was engaging in deliberate deception when it depicted Mikhail Gorbachev and perestroika as initiators of internal Communist reform after the Soviet–Afghan War in the 1980s. In 1988, Gruner urged a letter-writing campaign against arms control talks.

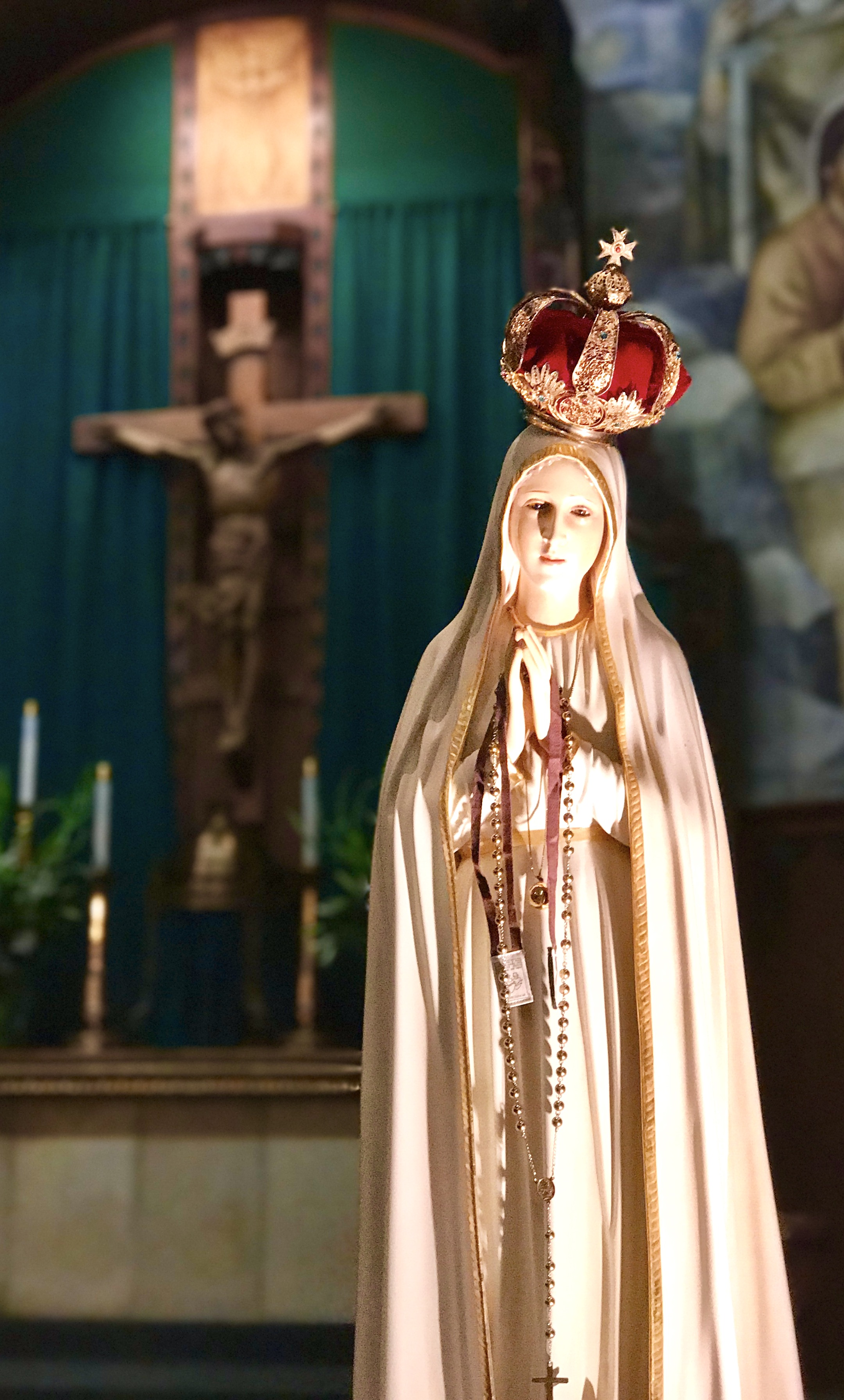
The International Pilgrim image of Our Lady of Fátima has traveled the world since the 1950s.

When the Soviet Union finally disintegrated in 1991, Fatima groups such as the Blue Army of Our Lady of Fátima and Fatima Family Apostolate rejoiced, regarding this as evidence of the efficacy of the dedication of the world to the Immaculate Heart of Mary that John Paul II had conducted nine years earlier. Gruner and the Fatima Crusader discounted it based on the lack of any spiritual conversion in Russia. Colin Donovan, STL criticized the Fatima Crusader, saying, "This magazine also attacks anyone who disagrees with Fr. Fr Gruner's opinions on Fatima, showing contempt for all other Fatima apostles. This includes holy priests like Fr. Robert J. Fox, whose Fatima Family Apostolate has propagated the Fatima message to far greater audiences than Fr. Gruner could ever hope to do".

Despite subsequent statements by the Congregation for the Doctrine of the Faith and by the remaining visionary Sister Lúcia, who is said to have denied Gruner's interpretation that a further consecration of Russia was needed, Gruner's criticisms continued. The Fatima Crusader has suggested that Sister Lúcia was kept from speaking the truth about the message of Fatima. Writer and commentator Carlos Evaristo held Gruner as an example of, in the words of John L. Allen, "an exegetical free-for-all that's long percolated in the Fatima underground", saying, "What happened with the Fatima message is that Sister Lúcia related it but never interpreted it. That left space for all sorts of strange theories."

The Southern Poverty Law Center, a non-profit civil rights organization, listed Gruner's Fatima Crusader as a periodical which has published antisemitic articles. The Anti-Defamation League identified Gruner as a Holocaust denier who promoted conspiracy theories about the Jews plotting to overthrow Christian civilization, and the Fatima Center as a radical Catholic organization that espoused antisemitic views.

== Suspension ==
In 1989 fr Gruner was ordered by Bishop Gerardo Pierro, his ecclesiastical superior, to return to Avellino, Italy, the diocese of his incardination. When he did not respond, Cardinal Innocenti, Prefect of the Congregation for the Clergy, wrote to warn him that failure to return would result in his suspension a divinis. He did not undertake the action required of him. In 1994, the new Bishop of Avellino issued a decree declaring Gruner a vagus ("wandering") priest. In 1996 Gruner was suspended from his priestly functions. He appealed the suspension, but was unsuccessful.

In September 2001, the Congregation for the Clergy stated that Gruner's suspension was "confirmed by a definitive sentence of the supreme tribunal of the Apostolic Signatura." According to the priest himself, he had never been suspended at all. Gruner was subsequently incardinated in the Archdiocese of Hyderabad, but remained suspended. The Catholic Archdiocese of Toronto and the Diocese of London, Ontario, warned parishioners not to support Gruner's organization.

On October 23, 2012, Gruner, along with attorney Christopher Ferrara, appeared at the headquarters of the European Union in Strasbourg, France to speak in support of a motion for a declaration by the EU Parliament calling upon Pope Benedict XVI to carry out the Consecration of Russia to the Immaculate Heart of Mary. Gruner and Ferrara were invited to speak at a press conference by the sponsors of the motion, MEPs Mario Borghezio and Lorenzo Fontana.

Fr Gruner was scheduled to appear at a June 22, 2014 event to mark the 44th anniversary of the alleged apparitions at Bayside, Queens. This event was to benefit St. Michael's World Apostolate. In response, the Brooklyn Diocese's Chancellor, Msgr. Anthony Hernandez, sent a communiqué to all pastors warning about a suspended priest who encourages these devotions and was planning an appearance in Queens: "Given that Father Gruner remains suspended, and, given that the alleged Bayside apparitions have been rejected by the legitimate ecclesiastical authorities, the faithful are strongly discouraged from participating in any events connected to Father Gruner or St. Michael's World Apostolate."

Fr Gruner's opinions regarding the Consecration of Russia, the Prophecy and the Third Secret were publicly contradicted by Fatima Seer Sister Lúcia who rebuked him for misrepresenting her during two genuine video-taped interviews held in 1992 and 1993. These were televised with her written permission on all 3 Portuguese Television Stations (RTP 1, SIC and TVI) during major news broadcasts in 1998, This public disclosure she claimed she had permitted for the purpose of public Clarification given the widely disseminated misinformation of Gruner and various other Fatima Conspiracy Theorists The video taped interview of 1993 was subsequently distributed in a 3-DVD set produced by Videos RTP entitled Os Mistérios de Fátima.

As related in a televised documentary production that aired in Portugal in 2017, several victims of slander and defamation sued Gruner and his cohorts in the Portuguese courts in 2001. The defendants who refused to appear in court were subsequently tried in absentia and found guilty in 2005, of misrepresentation of the Fatima Seer's true opinions and therefore having attacked and defamed various persons who truthfully had disclosed her views.

== Bibliography ==
- Nicholas Perry and Loreto Echevarria: Under the Heel of Mary: London: Routledge: 1988: ISBN 0-415-01296-1
- Sandra Zimdars-Swartz: Encountering Mary: Princeton: Princeton University Press: 1991: ISBN 0-691-07371-6
- Francis Alban, Christopher A. Ferrara & Malachi Martin: "Fatima Priest": Pound Ridge: Good Counsel Publications: 1997: ISBN 0-9663046-2-4
