= John Rao =

American historian

John C. Rao (born 1951) is a former associate professor of history at St. John's University, director of the Roman Forum/Dietrich von Hildebrand Institute, and former president of Una Voce America.

In 1977 Rao received his D.Phil. in Modern European History from Oxford University. Works include Americanism and the Collapse of the Church in the United States, Removing the Blindfold, and Periphery. He was a central interview subject for a PBS documentary on the annual Paris-Chartres Pilgrimage by traditionalist Catholics from around the world.

Rao has led the Roman Forum's annual symposium at Lake Garda.

Rao is a frequent contributor to The Remnant, a traditionalist Catholic biweekly. Rao is known for writing his columns from Rocco's Cafe, an Italian pastry shop in Greenwich Village Manhattan. As a traditionalist Catholic, he is a strong critic of neoconservatism in both politics and the Church.

In 2017, he signed a document along with a number of other clergy and academics labeled as a "Filial Correction" of Pope Francis.
