= The Newman Society =

- The Newman Society: The Oxford Catholic Society
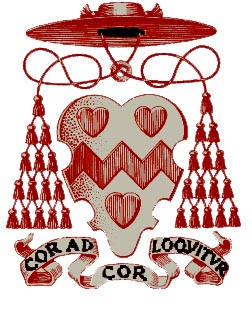
- The Society uses the arms of its Patron, John Henry Newman
- Nickname: The Newman
- Named after: John Henry Newman
- Formation: 1878; 148 years ago
- Founder: Hartwell de la Garde Grissell
- Founded at: St Aloysius' Catholic Church, Oxford
- Type: Student Society
- Purpose: The support of the Catholic Faith in the University of Oxford
- Headquarters: The Old Palace
- Location: Oxford, UK
- Coordinates: 51.749279°N 1.257690°W
- Members: 580 (2020)
- President: Monica Fox
- Affiliations: University of Oxford
- Website: newmansociety.co.uk
- Formerly called: The Catholic Club (1878-1888)

Trinity College's bust of John Henry Newman

The Newman Society: The Oxford Catholic Society (est. 1878; current form 2012) is Oxford University's oldest Roman Catholic organization. It is a student society named as a tribute to John Henry Cardinal Newman, who agreed to lend his name to a group formed seventeen years before the English hierarchy formally permitted Catholics to attend the university. The society acquired its current form and title following the merger in 2012 of the pre-existing Newman Society and Oxford University's Catholic Society (est. 1990). It exists, according to its constitution, to 'work in conjunction with the Chaplains to support and encourage Catholic students in their Christian vocation by promoting their personal, intellectual and spiritual development, social interaction, and apostolic witness within the broader context of their university experience' and has served as the model for Catholic students' societies throughout the English-speaking world.

== History ==
=== Foundation: 1878–1896 ===
The founders of the Catholic Club, 1878; second from right, Gerard Manley Hopkins

Founded as the Catholic Club in 1878, it was not until 1888, the club was renamed as Newman Society. At the time, the renaming of the society was not uncontroversial; Lord Acton, whose son Dick was amongst those involved in the changing of the name, counselled him to be careful. Owen Chadwick describes his letter of advice thus:

[He] felt it to be awkward. On one side was the pride of Trinity College in Newman as one of its eminent graduates; and of Oriel too, connected as it was ‘with the period of his fame’. But on the other side Newman still had enemies in Oxford and they were no small men – Max Müller ‘probably’ his worst, but perhaps Jowett also, and then several secular minds. [Acton’s] advice to Dick on this matter was ‘Do nothing too conspicuously.’

Meetings of the society originally took place at the parish church of St. Aloysius Gonzaga or in members' rooms. Speakers were frequently undergraduates, as records show, and topics were wide-ranging. Quoting from surviving minute books, Walter Drumm notes:

At the twenty-fourth meeting, on 2 November 1890, Mr. Parry (University College) read a paper on ‘Lake Dwellings in Switzerland’. ‘A desultory discussion followed with most of the speakers professing ignorance of the subject’. Mr. Urquhart read a paper on ‘Christian Socialists in France’ and Lord Westmeath on ‘De Quincy and Opium Eating’. Hilaire Belloc was probably the best known of the early members of the Newman; on 11 June 1893, when he was still an undergraduate at Balliol, he spoke on ‘The Church and the Republic’. In the following year, the Society fielded a football XI, although the title ‘Newman Football Team’ was not approved by all members.

When the Catholic Chaplaincy to the university was established in 1896 the society found a natural home there, often meeting in the Chaplain's rooms. The same year also saw the society's hundredth meeting, which took the form – on 18 June 1896 – of "a dinner at the Clarendon Hotel. Bishop Ilsley of Birmingham, the Duke of Norfolk and thirty-two others, which was practically the whole membership, consumed at 10/- per head: lobster bisque, sole dauphinoise, poussin (method of cooking unstated), gateaux and fromage." The New York Times reported the dinner, observing that "the real point of the festivity ... was not its apparent occasion. The main topic was the final settlement ... of the long-contested question of the recognition by the Roman Church of the education of Catholics ... at Oxford and Cambridge."

=== Twentieth century: pre-1960s ===
The minutes for the period 1898 to 1907 have been lost; "the records of the Newman Society are very sparse until the 1940s, from which period society cards have survived." However, as Drumm has emphasized, what records do remain all point to the fact of the Newman's being central to Catholic life in Oxford:

...we can see from the earliest records that the newly arrived undergraduate at the turn of the [20th] century would have been welcomed not only by his chaplain ... but by his fellows who met at the Newman.

By 1926, when Ronald Knox became chaplain to Oxford, the society's speakers were no longer predominantly drawn from the ranks of students. Meeting in the long room on the first floor of the Old Palace – then known as the Newman Room – the society frequently attracted important figures. Such was the Newman's importance that it even laid claim to some of the Old Palace's furniture; Knox records that the Newman Room's "larger sofa ... was presented to the Society by Mgr. Barnes, who assured me that it was the sofa on which his father proposed marriage to his mother".

Meetings during Knox's period as chaplain were generally held on Sunday evenings. In a description of a typical Sunday, Knox wrote:

At five or ten minutes to seven the Newman speaker, duly washed, must be taken off to whatever club the Committee is dining at. He and the Committee must be lugged back to the Old Palace about 8.10 and given port in the chaplain's room. The chaplain will keep a look-out to see when the members have mostly arrived (he may even send an S.O.S. to Campion to ask if a few people will turn up and conceal the sparsity of attendance); then he will take the Committee down to the Newman Room ... and come to roost in a comfortable chair if he can still find one. During the five-minute interval after the paper, the chaplain invites one or two of the more distinguished people present ... to come up after the meeting. During question-time he tries to keep things going. ...The visitors probably retire at eleven or soon after and the chaplain (unless he has the speaker to entertain) can now enjoy his own company.

When Knox finally retired from the role of chaplain in 1939, his impact on the Newman Society and Catholic life in Oxford generally had been such that his farewell included "a dinner at the Randolph Hotel at which the Newman Society presented him with an early folio of the Douay Bible, a silver mug, a water-colour of the Old Palace, and £50." His involvement with the society was not over, however. Women had been admitted to Oxford in 1920, and became members of the Newman Society and of the congregation at the Old Palace in 1941, having previously been cared for by a separate chaplaincy. Knox – who had been called on to return to Oxford but was unenthusiastic –- proposed the merger to the Archbishop of Birmingham as a solution to the unexpected vacancy he was being asked to fill; as a confident Evelyn Waugh would later put it, Knox "was the author of the temporary amalgamation, which persists to this day."

In 1945 the Newman was sufficiently established to merit two mentions in Waugh's "Oxford novel", Brideshead Revisited. The first reference comes in the course of Lady Marchmain's comments to Charles Ryder about her son, Sebastian:

I want Sebastian to have all sorts of friends, not just one. Monsignor Bell tells me he never mixes with the other Catholics, never goes to the Newman, very rarely goes to mass even. Heaven forbid that he should only know Catholics, but he must know some.

The society participated in the refurbishing of the Chaplaincy which followed the Second World War; with Newman funds purchase was made of 'a new wireless set and an electrically operated gramophone'. Socially, the Newman continued to reflect the character of Catholicism among Oxford students; Baroness Williams of Crosby has recorded that while she "went occasionally to the Newman Society", she "was never part of the exclusive Catholic groups, usually young men and women from distinguished recusant families." Francis Muir has written of being introduced (by then-chaplain Mgr. Valentine Elwes) to Elizabeth Jennings at a "Newman Society bun-fight" during this period.

The academic year 1956-7 saw the society hosting a disputation conducted by Oxford's Dominicans, an event repeated to much acclaim in Hilary 2014, with a further disputation scheduled for Michaelmas of the same year. In 1959 the society held a dinner at which the Vice-Chancellor was represented, and which was attended by Archbishop of Westminster William Godfrey, who had become a cardinal in the previous year. The latter took the opportunity to announce the resignation of Mgr. Elwes.

=== Twentieth century: 1960–1990 ===
Following the reforms of the Second Vatican Council in the 1960s, the 1970s proved a turbulent decade in the life of the Church. Karl Rahner, who loomed large in the theological battles of the period, was one of several high-profile speakers at the Newman whose presence served to underline the era's changes. The situation at the Chaplaincy, then under the authority of Crispian Hollis, was bleak, as the system of catechetical Sunday sermons – established in the time of Ronald Knox for the purpose of promoting students' doctrinal and spiritual formation – collapsed. In the midst of widespread ignorance, doctrinal confusion, and moral rebellion, the Newman staked out its position in 1973, hosting an address by Elizabeth Anscombe titled "Contraception, Sin and Natural Law" – a philosophical defence of Pope Paul VI's encyclical on artificial birth control (Humanae Vitae). Yet the society was not so inflexible as to refuse to accommodate some new social realities; a 1972 termcard expressed the hope "that activists, gnomes, ravers and potential saints will be inspired by this ... term's programme."

By 1982 fashions had changed again, so that the year of Pope John Paul II's apostolic voyage to Britain also saw the Newman organizing a "Boaters and Bloomers" event – a prize being offered for the "best Brideshead dress". The Pope's visit was itself advertised by one enterprising president as a Newman Society event: Oxonians were informed that "His Holiness the Pope will address Newman Society members and others in Coventry."

The 1980s were a difficult period for Oxford's student Catholics, as the Newman Society lost a sense of its role, held since the war, as institutional representative of the university's young Catholics, leading to the unsatisfactory situation which prevailed until the 2012 merger, when the heritage of the Newman combined with the vibrancy of the CathSoc.

The Newman had ceased to be the university's sole Catholic society, following the creation by the university chaplains and Chaplaincy community of the Oxford University Catholic Society in 1990 to take up the slack left by the increasingly narrow focus of the Newman. The Newman continued to play a significant role in Catholic life in Oxford: in 1996, the society organized a Sarum Rite Mass for the feast of the Translation of St Frideswide, patron saint of Oxford. Another such Mass was organized by members of the Newman in 1997, for the feast of Candlemas. Videos of this latter Mass can be viewed on YouTube. The society marked the end of the 20th century with a number of events, culminating in a visit by George Pell, then Archbishop of Melbourne and not yet a cardinal.

=== Twenty-first century: Benedict XVI ===
Following the election of Pope Benedict XVI, mentions of the Newman Society and its events appeared in the Catholic and secular press on a number of occasions. During the Regensburg affair of 2006, the society's voice was heard with the publication of a letter in The Daily Telegraph from the then-President:

I understand that the Pope's words prompted some Indian Muslims to protest by burning an effigy of the Pontiff. How extraordinary that this old English custom should appear there so many years after the Empire fell. I assumed the eccentrics in Lewes, East Sussex, were practically peerless in the practice of pope-burning. ...[M]arvellous that, even if they failed to read the context of the Pope's remarks, these people still managed to wheel out a centuries-old English tradition.

Newman Mass in the 1962 extraordinary form of the Roman Rite, 2007

In November 2007, following Pope Benedict's motu proprio Summorum Pontificum, the Society organized a High Mass as in the 1962 Roman Missal to mark the centenary of co-founder Hartwell de la Garde Grissell's death.

In 2009 the society was addressed by Cardinal Pell, archbishop of Sydney, on the subject of religious and secular intolerance, and their implications for contemporary Christian witness. Giving the inaugural Thomas More Lecture in the university's Divinity School, the Cardinal spoke of the totalitarian tendencies of modern liberalism, and the dangers for the Church posed by the rise of "anti-discrimination legislation" and "human rights tribunals". He concluded his address with a call to arms for contemporary believers:

Christians have to recover their genius for showing that there are better ways to live and to build a good society; ways which respect freedom, empower individuals, and transform communities. They also have to recover their self-confidence and courage. The secular and religious intolerance of our day needs to be confronted regularly and publicly. Believers need to call the bluff of what is, even in most parts of Europe, a small minority with disproportionate influence in the media. This is one of the crucial tasks for Christians in the twenty-first century.

During his week-long visit to the Newman Society the Cardinal presided at a Solemn Latin Mass organized by the society in intercession for Newman's beatification, achieved, of course, during Benedict XVI's momentous visit to Britain in 2010, and Solemn Vespers in the 1962 form.

In October 2012 the university's two Catholic societies merged, as a result of the need to unite the distinguished heritage of the Newman Society with the Catholic Society, which was, in co-operation with the Chaplains, supporting the great majority of Catholic students, thus creating The Newman Society: The Oxford University Catholic Society and ending the irony of there being two Catholic societies. The merged Society resolved to continue the St Thomas More Lecture, though it has evolved into a more broadly-based event than it had been previously. The newly merged society made its debut on the broader Catholic youth scene when it acted as autumn host of the Catholic Societies of the Southern Universities in November 2012.

== The contemporary Newman Society ==
=== Ethos ===
Today, the Society is made up of a diverse range of Oxford's student Catholics, from all backgrounds and representing a wide range of traditions with the Church. Thus, while many are involved with contemporary worship styles, such as Taizé and 'Praise and Worship' events, support for the Tridentine Mass is ongoing (although the society is prohibited from hosting the old rite), as part of a broadly-based spirituality. Saint John Henry Newman remains very much the Society's patron, with a June 2014 walking pilgrimage to the site of his conversion, at Littlemore on the outskirts of Oxford, attracting an enthusiastic turnout.

While the Society is based at the University Catholic Chaplaincy, it has links with central Oxford's other Catholic churches: Blackfriars, St Benet's (before its closure in 2022), and the Oratory. The presence of the Society of Jesus in the Chaplaincy has added an additional dimension to the ethos of the Society. The Society is strongly committed to charitable work, with many members participating in the activities of the Oxford Companions of the Order of Malta, Society of St Vincent de Paul, CAFOD and Aid to the Church in Need.

=== Term structure ===
During full term there is a speaker every Thursday at 8pm, usually in the Blue Room of The Old Palace, the historic building of the University Catholic Chaplaincy. Talks are preceded by a group rosary in the chapel at 6:30pm and a shared meal, cooked by students, at 7pm and followed by Adoration of the Blessed Sacrament, Benediction and Compline. There are also special events such as the Catholic Freshers' Fair at the start of Michaelmas, a Christmas party, and visits to historical sites, such as the priest holes of Mapledurham House. The Society hosts a Shrove Tuesday Céilidh in Hilary, and a Garden Party in the grounds of Campion Hall in Trinity. The Society had revived the practice of organizing sporting events. There was an annual Society vs Alumni match (the Oxford vs Cambridge match is now organised by the chaplaincy), while a rugby team was in the process of formation, and trained on Saturday mornings during Full Term.

=== Committee ===
The Society is led by a committee, composed of a President, Vice-President, Secretary, Treasurer, Publicity, Outreach and Social Officers, the St. Thomas More Lecture Secretary, the Keeper of the Bar, and Master of Ceremonies along with additional roles. The committee consists of both undergraduates and postgraduates, and reflects a mixture of home and international students, from a variety of colleges. Elections are typically at the end of Michaelmas, which also sees a black-tie President's Dinner, again cooked by the committee.

The president for 2026 is Monica Fox (Jesus College), and the Senior Member is Professor Paul Yowell, Fellow at Oriel College. Past presidents have included people who have gone on to be MP's, Bishops, Priests and Abbots as well as a variety of other professions.

=== Image ===
The Society's motto is the phrase first used by Augustine of Hippo (in the Donatist controversy), and subsequently adopted by Cardinal Newman: "Securus judicat orbis terrarum" ("the world's verdict is secure"). The Society tie features stripes of papal gold, cardinal red, and Oxford blue; it can be bought at any Society event along with mugs, bowties and the Society's magazine. There were also Newman Society hoodies.

== Presidents ==
=== Newman Society ===
- 2026 – Monica Fox (Jesus)
- 2025 – Adam Gardner (St Peter’s)
- 2024 – Rosa Thorne (Wadham)
- 2023 – William Morris (St Benet’s/Regent’s Park)
- 2022 – Aloysius Atkinson (St John’s)
- 2021 – Vincent Elvin (Mansfield)
- MT 2020 – Rebecca Galbraith (University)
- HT/TT 2020 – Liam Cain (Keble)
- MT 2019 – Naoise Grenham (Christ Church, formerly LMH)
- HT/TT 2019 – Giovanni Pala (Magdalen)
- 2018 – Joshua Caminiti (Trinity)
- 2017 – Jamie Wilmore (Trinity)
- 2016 – William Maddock III (Blackfriars, later Brasenose)
- 2015 – Natalie Dennehy (St John’s)
- 2014 – Nathan Pinkoski (St Edmund’s Hall)
- MT 2013 – Josephine Jackson (St Edmund’s Hall)
- HT/TT 2013 – Roberto Weeden-Sanz (St Benet’s Hall) [Cllr. for London Borough of Barnet, elected 3.V.2018]
- MT 2012 – Bryan Beom Sohn (St Edmund’s Hall)
- TT 2012 – Sofia Abasolo (Merton)
- MT 2010-HT 2012 – Timothy Sherwin (Merton)
- TT 2010 – Conor Gannon (Wolfson)
- HT 2010 – Hubert MacGreevy (St. Peter’s)
- MT 2009 – Emeric Monfront (Christ Church)
- TT 2009 – Jocky McLean (Christ Church)
- MT 2008-HT 2009 – Patrick Milner (Keble)
- TT 2008 – Mark Hamid (Corpus Christi) [one day Presidency]
- TT 2008 – Paul Fleming (Mansfield) [General Secretary of Equity, the actors’ trade union]
- HT 2008 – Yaqoob Bangash (Keble)
- MT 2007 – Michael Ryan (Brasenose)
- TT 2007 – Laura Barrosse-Antle (St. John’s)
- HT 2007 – Darren Pius Collins (Keble) [Ordained Priest of the O.Praem. 1.II.2016]
- MT 2006 – Alexander Morrison (Oriel)
- TT 2006 – Matthew Rupert Allen (St. Benet’s) [Ordained Priest 7.IX.2012]
- HT 2006 – Alexander Stafford (St. Benet’s) [M.P. for Rother Valley, 2019-2024]
- MT 2005 – Samuel Jacobs (St. Benet’s)
- TT 2005 – Katherine Shaw (Merton)
- HT 2005 – Sinead Doyle (Trinity)
- MT 2004 – Sede vacante
- TT 2004 – Patricia Boon (St. Hilda’s)
- HT 2004 – Francis Murphy (Trinity) [Ordained Priest of the Archdiocese of Southwark 21.VII.2018]
- MT 2003 – Richard Pickett (Exeter)
- TT,2003 – Richard Eschwege (Balliol)
- HT 2003 – Jonathan Gress-Wright (Merton)
- MT 2002 – Edward Davies (Oriel)
- TT 2002 – James Mearns (Keble)
- HT 2002 – Dom John Wisdom, O.S.B. (St. Benet’s) [Ordained Priest of the O.Praem. 28.VIII.2007]
- MT 2001 – Edmund Lovett (St. Benet’s)
- TT 2001 – Christopher Guyver (Keble)
- HT 2001 – Hugh Allan (St. Benet’s) [Ordained Priest of the O.Praem. 22.XI.2002; appointed Apostolic Administrator of the Prefecture of the Falkland Islands and Ecclesiastical Superior of the Missions sui iuris of Ascension, St Helena and Tristan da Cunha 26.X.2016]
- MT 2000 – Julian Waterfield (Exeter)
- TT 2000 – Richard McCarthy (Oriel)
- HT 2000 – Emily Boon (St. Hugh's)
- MT 1999 – Lee Barrett (Queen’s)
- TT 1999 – Gregory Flash (St. Hugh’s)
- HT 1999 – Marcus Williams (Christ Church) [Ordained Priest of the FSSP 2018]
- MT 1998 – Francis Lee (Merton)
- TT 1998 – Adam Fimister (Exeter)
- HT 1998 – Marcus Holden (St. Benet’s) [Ordained Priest of the Archdiocese of Southwark 10.IX.2005]
- MT 1997 – Alexander Anderson (St. Benet’s)
- TT 1997 – Uwe Michael Lang (St. John’s) [Ordained Priest of the Cong. Orat. Lond. 2004]
- HT 1997 – Marie Cabaud (LMH)
- MT 1996 – Alexander Master (Corpus Christi) [Ordained Priest of the Diocese of Westminster 2004]
- TT 1996 – Mark Richmond (Balliol)
- HT 1996 – Nicholas Schofield (Exeter) [Ordained Priest of the Diocese of Westminster 24.V.2003]
- MT 1995 – Ashley Paver (St. Hugh’s)
- HT 1979 – Timothy Finigan (Corpus Christi)
- MT 1973 – David Tokarz (Oriel)
- MT 1972 – Jeremey Ridgen (St. Catherine’s)
- MT 1970 – TT 1972 – Margaret Fay McFall (LMH); Patrick Dunleavy (Corpus Christi); Peter Jamison (Oriel); and Martin Cunningham (Worcester)
- TT 1962 – Peter McManus (St John’s)
- HT 1962 – Peter Huggins (Keble)
- MT 1961 – Thomas Atthill (University)
- TT 1961 – Michael Blakstad (Oriel)
- HT 1961 – Christopher Long (Balliol)
- MT 1960 – Sally French (St Anne’s)
- TT 1960 – Kevin Lazenby (Jesus)
- HT 1960 – Michael Kenworthy-Browne (Oriel)
- MT 1959 – T. J. Firth (Lincoln)
- TT 1959 – B. W. Power (Worcester)
- HT 1959 – H. D. Plunkett (Brasenose)
- TT 1958 – V. T. Emerson (Merton)
- HT 1958 – Kevin Garry (Magdalen)
- 1943 – Pierre Houédard (Jesus) [1949-1992 Dom Sylvester Houédard O.S.B.of Prinknash Abbey]
- 1878 – Oliver R. Vassall-Phillips (Balliol) [Ordained Priest of the C.Ss.R. 29.IX.1884]

=== Catholic Society ===
- 2011 – Lorna Forrester (Mansfield)
- 2010 – Julia Schoettl (Trinity)
- 2009 – Bonnie Lander (Wolfson)
- 2008 – Ellie Doherty (Oriel)
- 2007 – Christopher Serpell (Pembroke)
- 2006 – Olivia von Wulffen (Merton)
- 2005 – Mark Rayner (Worcester)
- 2004 – Kathryn Arblaster (Somerville)
- 2003 – Clare Ashdowne (St Catherine's)
- 2002 – Elisa Wheeler (Somerville)
- 2001 – Luke O'Sullivan (Greyfriars)
- 2000 – Ruth Ashfield (LMH)
- 1999 – Michael D'Arcy (Balliol)
- 1998 – Amy Kieran (St Hilda's)
- 1997 – Paul McManus (Exeter)
- 1996 – Phil Robinson
- 1995 – Clare Brennan (Exeter)

== Notable speakers ==
=== Previous generations ===
The society has been addressed by prominent and influential Catholics – as well as non-Catholics of interest to a Catholic audience – throughout its history. Jesuit poet Gerard Manley Hopkins was a founding member, and in the Newman's early years both he and author Robert Hugh Benson – also a member – gave papers. Maurice Baring's Punch and Judy was written for the occasion of his addressing the society, and it was at a meeting of the Newman that Christopher Dawson heard Newman biographer Wilfrid Ward speak. A biographer has argued that the experience was an influence in Dawson's conversion.

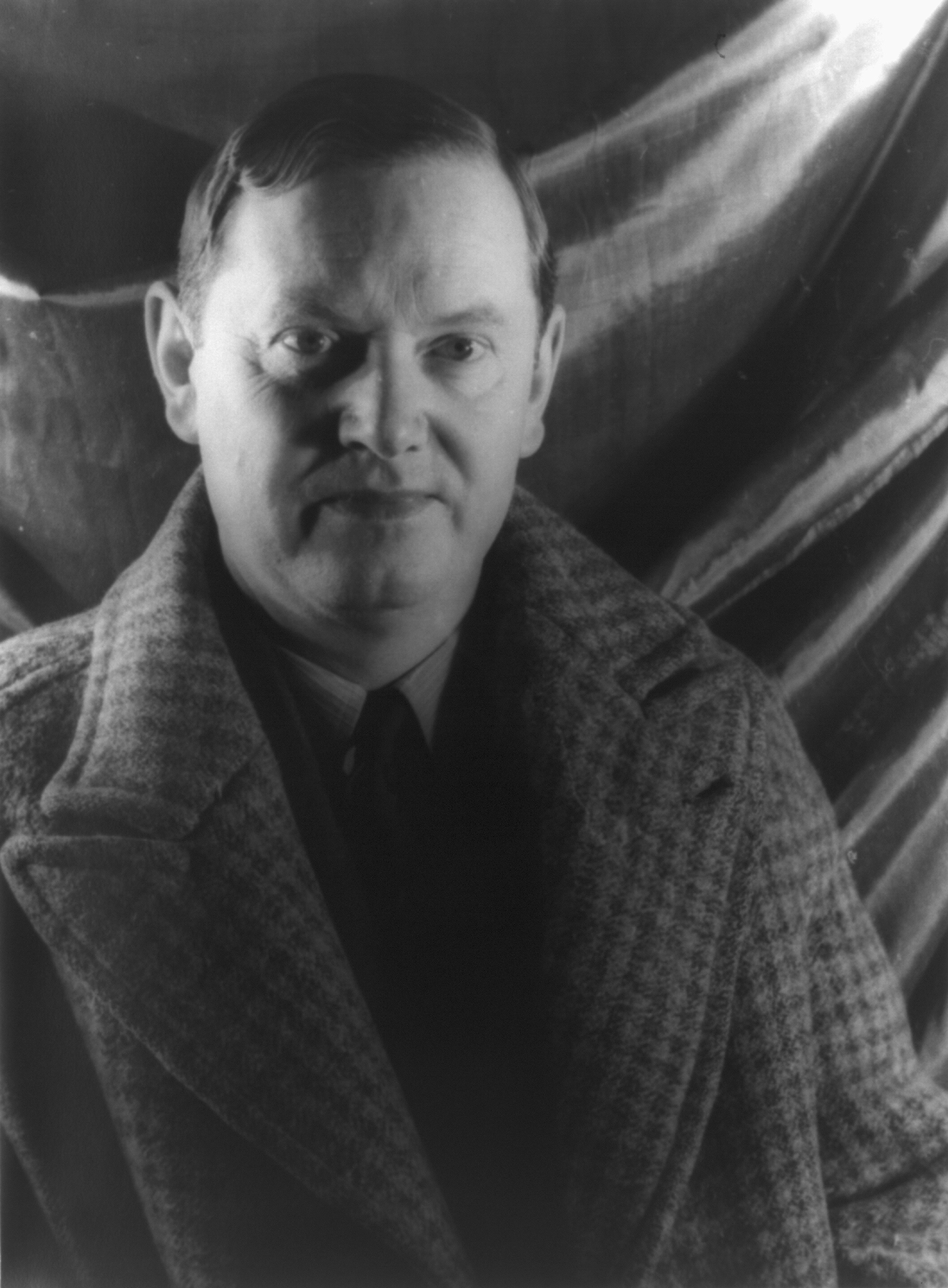
Evelyn Waugh addressed the Newman as a member

Evelyn Waugh, Hilaire Belloc and G. K. Chesterton all spoke to the Newman; it was while attending a talk by Chesterton that Waugh first met Harold Acton, to whom he would later dedicate Decline and Fall. The 17th Duke of Norfolk would later in life speak of his "vivid recollections of meeting G. K. Chesterton when I ... attended some of his lectures to the Newman Society, which I will never forget." When Waugh himself addressed members in 1956, it was with an apocalyptic tone: "Our whole literary world is sinking into black disaster. ...I am sure that those who live for the next thirty years will see the art of literature dying."

Other distinguished speakers who addressed the society in the course of the 20th century include Baron Friedrich von Hügel, Fr Ronald Knox, Fr Martin d'Arcy, Sir Alec Guinness, Arthur Michael Ramsey, The Princess Royal, Rowan Williams, John Finnis, Malcolm Muggeridge, Lord Longford, Immanuel Jakobovits, Viscount Monckton, Maurice Wiles, Terry Eagleton, William Rees-Mogg, Hans Adolf Krebs, Basil Mitchell, Dorothy Hodgkin, Auberon Waugh, Richard Southern, F. R. Leavis, Ninian Smart, Dan Berrigan, Herbert McCabe and Martin Gilbert.

=== Twenty-first century ===
Recent terms' speakers of note have included Piers Paul Read on the reality of Hell; Fr Timothy Finigan on 'Humanae Vitae'; Fr Thomas Weinandy on the Incarnation; Fr John Saward on the character of Heaven, and, separately, on the motu proprio Summorum Pontificum; Fr Aidan Nichols on the centenary of Pope Pius X's condemnation of Modernism; Professor Geza Vermes (in debate with Dom Henry Wansbrough) on the historicity of the Gospels; Ann Widdecombe MP on being a Catholic politician; Sir Anthony Kenny on the Oxford Movement; and Baroness Williams of Crosby on the relationship between God and Caesar.

During the 2013–4 academic year speakers have ranged from Walter Hooper, secretary to CS Lewis, to Archbishop Eamon Martin of Armagh, while the highlights of Trinity 2014 were an inspirational talk, entitled The Menace of the State shall find be Unafraid, on the crucial role played by the Church in the disintegration of Apartheid in 1980s South Africa and the powerful personal testimony of Fr David Branford, From Anglican Vicar to Catholic Priest. The 2013 St Thomas More Lecture was delivered by Sr Helen Prejean on her work with condemned criminals in the United States, while 2014 saw a change of focus as Oxford's own Prof. Henry Mayr-Harting spoke on Confession: Yesterday and Today. Since the merger, speaker topics have evolved to reflect the heritage of both groups, with the committee seeking to balance the diverse interests of Oxford's young Catholics. The conviviality of Mgr Knox's days is combined with a renewed optimism and confidence when the Society meets each Thursday in term-time, for an informal supper at 7pm and a talk at 8pm, followed by prayer, refreshments and conversation.

Since the Coronavirus Pandemic the Society has hosted notable speakers such as John Finnis, Paul Shrimpton, Sally Axworthy, Jacob Rees-Mogg, Alexander Stafford, Mike Kane, George Weigel and Cardinal Pell.

Under the previous President, a notable line-up of speakers have addressed the Society. They include a notable ecumenical gathering with the Orthodox Community which was addressed by the Chancellor of the Greek Orthodox Archdiocese of Thyateira and Great Britain, Fr. Nephon Tsimalis, Joseph Shaw, Fr. Andrew Pinsent, Richard Rex, Professor Nadey Hakim, Archbishop Malcolm McMahon, Bishop Kenneth Nowakowski, Ambassador Piotr Wilczek, Eddie Hughes (British politician), Cardinal Vincent Nichols, Cardinal Michael J. Fitzgerald, and Patriarch Louis Raphael I Sako.

== Thomas More Lecture ==
The Thomas More Lecture invites a notable Catholic speaker to give a talk regarding a faith based topic.

=== Past Speakers ===
Newman Society:

- HT 2026 - Fr. George Bowen C.O. on Newman and how he was declared Doctor of the Church.
- MT 2024 - Vice Chancellor, Prof. Irene Tracey on the neuroscience of belief.
- MT 2023 - Fr. Wojciech Giertych OP on living out the faith in our Western society.
- MT 2022 - George Weigel on Vatican II: why it was necessary, what it taught, why it is vitally important today.
- MT 2021 - George Cardinal Pell on the suffering of the Church in a post-Christian society.
- HT 2021 - Prof. David Jones on Thomas More and John Donne on assisted dying.
- MT 2019 - The Lord Shinkwin on Church and state.
- TT 2018 - Jan Graffius on Thomas More and Dame Alice: a new reflection on a relationship a defined by artefacts.
- MT 2016 - Prof. Susan Bruce on leaving home: Europe and Utopia.
- HT 2015 - Rev. Prof. Frank Kennedy SJ on did Jesuit missionaries create a new musical genre?
- TT 2014 - Prof. Henry Mayr-Harting on confession yesterday and today.
- 2013 - Sr. Helen Prejean CSJ on the death penalty in the United States.
- TT 2010 - Archbishop Diarmuid Martin on young people in the Church and response to scandals.
- HT 2010 - The Rt. Hon. Paul Murphy MP on Catholicism and the Northern Ireland peace process.
- MT 2009 - Bishop John Arnold and the Rt. Hon. Dr. Evan Harris MP on the place of Christianity in the British constitution.
- TT 2009 - Francis Campbell on faith and foreign policy: a perspective from the Vatican.
- HT 2009 - George Cardinal Pell on varieties of intolerance: religious and secular.

Catholic Society:

- HT 1998 – The Lord Nolan
- TT 1996 – Archbishop John Quinn

== See also ==
- List of Newman Societies
