= Andrew Pinsent =

The Reverend Andrew Pinsent
- Born: Andrew Charles Pinsent; 1966 (age 59–60)

Ecclesiastical career
- Religion: Christianity (Roman Catholic)

Academic background
- Education: Merton College, Oxford; Pontifical Gregorian University; Saint Louis University
- Doctoral advisor: Eleonore Stump

Academic work
- Discipline: Theology
- Sub-discipline: Philosophy
- Institutions: Harris Manchester College, Oxford; Athenaeum of Ohio

Fr. Andrew Pinsent (born 1966) is professor of theology and philosophy at the Athenaeum of Ohio in Cincinnati, Ohio, and a Catholic priest of the Diocese of Arundel and Brighton in England. Until 2024, he was Research Director of the Ian Ramsey Centre for Science and Religion, part of the Faculty of Theology and Religion at the University of Oxford. He was also a Research Fellow at Harris Manchester College, Oxford.

A physicist by training, Pinsent was involved in the DELPHI project at CERN, and co-authored 31 of the collaboration's publications. A focus of his current research is the application of insights from autism and social cognition to "second-person" accounts of moral perception and character formation.

== Education and career ==
Pinsent has a degree in physics and a D.Phil. in high-energy physics from Merton College, Oxford. He also has three degrees in philosophy and theology from the Pontifical Gregorian University in Rome, and a Ph.D. in philosophy from Saint Louis University.

A member of the United Kingdom Institute of Physics and a tutor of the Maryvale Institute in Birmingham, Pinsent has been interviewed for various media, including the BBC and EWTN, on issues of science and faith. He has also written for the Catholic Herald, who identified him as a prominent young Catholic. His most recent book is The Second-Person Perspective in Aquinas’s Ethics: Virtues and Gifts (2012). Besides academic publications, he is a co-author of the Evangelium catechetical course and the Credo, Apologia, and Lumen pocket books.

In 2017, Pinsent signed a document along with a number of other clergy and academics labeled as a "Filial Correction" of Pope Francis.

== See also ==
- List of Roman Catholic cleric-scientists
