= Robert Brucciani =

Priest

Rev. Fr. Robert Brucciani SSPX

Orders
- Ordination: 2004

Personal details
- Born: 1968 (age 57–58) Leicester, Great Britain
- Denomination: Society of St. Pius X

Robert Brucciani (born 1968) is a Society of St Pius X priest who is the current General Bursar of the Society of Saint Pius X and previously served as the District Superior of Great Britain & Scandinavia.

In 2017, he signed a document along with a number of other clergy and academics labeled as a "Filial Correction" of Pope Francis.

== Career ==
In 1998, Robert Brucciani entered the Seminary of St. Curé d'Ars, Flavigny, France. In 2004, after his years of study, Brucciani was ordained a priest at the Seminary of St. Pius X in Ecône, Switzerland. After his ordination, he spent time at St. Michael's School, Burghclere. When he finished his work at St. Michael's School, he took up a post of prior of the Priory of the Most Holy Trinity in Palayamkottai, India for eight years.

In 2015, Father Brucciani was appointed as District Superior of Great Britain & Scandinavia.

In 2017, Father Brucciani signed the petition to Pope Francis called Correctio filialis de haeresibus propagatis regarding heresies they believed to be contained within Amoris laetitia, a post-synodal apostolic exhortation written by Pope Francis. They have not received a response.

Father Brucciani concluded his term as District Superior on January 1, 2024, and assumed his new role as General Bursar at the General House in Menzingen, Switzerland. He was succeeded by Fr. David Sherry, an Irish priest from County Cavan.
