= The Wanderer (Catholic newspaper) =

American lay Roman Catholic weekly newspaper

- Type: Weekly newspaper
- Owner: The Wanderer Printing Company
- Founder: Joseph Matt
- Founded: 1867
- Political alignment: Catholic social teaching Traditionalist conservatism
- Language: English
- City: Saint Paul, Minnesota
- Country: United States
- ISSN: 1068-168X
- Website: thewandererpress.com

The Wanderer is a lay-run Catholic weekly newspaper published in Saint Paul, Minnesota, and distributed to a national market.

== History ==
It was founded by Joseph Matt on 7 October 1867. It was originally published in Milwaukee, Wisconsin in German to minister to German immigrants to Minnesota, Wisconsin, and the Dakotas who were being "attracted to and influenced by Masonic and quasi-Masonic German-language newspapers and organizations." A German language edition was published until 1957. The English edition began in 1931.

The Wanderer says it was a major early opponent of a perceived "Americanizing" of the Church. That tendency was condemned by Pope Leo XIII in his 1899 apostolic letter, Testem benevolentiae nostrae.

Unlike diocesan publications or those of religious institutes, the newspaper is independent of ecclesiastical oversight. It is considered conservative and traditionalist. The Wanderer gives the following self-description:

The Wanderer, a national Catholic weekly journal of news, commentary, and analysis, has been publishing continually since 1867. Owned and operated by Catholic laymen, The Wanderer is independent of ecclesiastical oversight but maintains a fiercely loyal adherence to Catholic doctrine and discipline.

According to The Wanderer, through the Vatican II years, a dispute over the council led to Walter Matt leaving The Wanderer to his brother, Alphonse Matt, and founding The Remnant in 1967.

The Wanderer was described in America magazine in 2009 as "about as far to the right as you can get and still be in the Catholic Church".
