= Hartwell de la Garde Grissell =

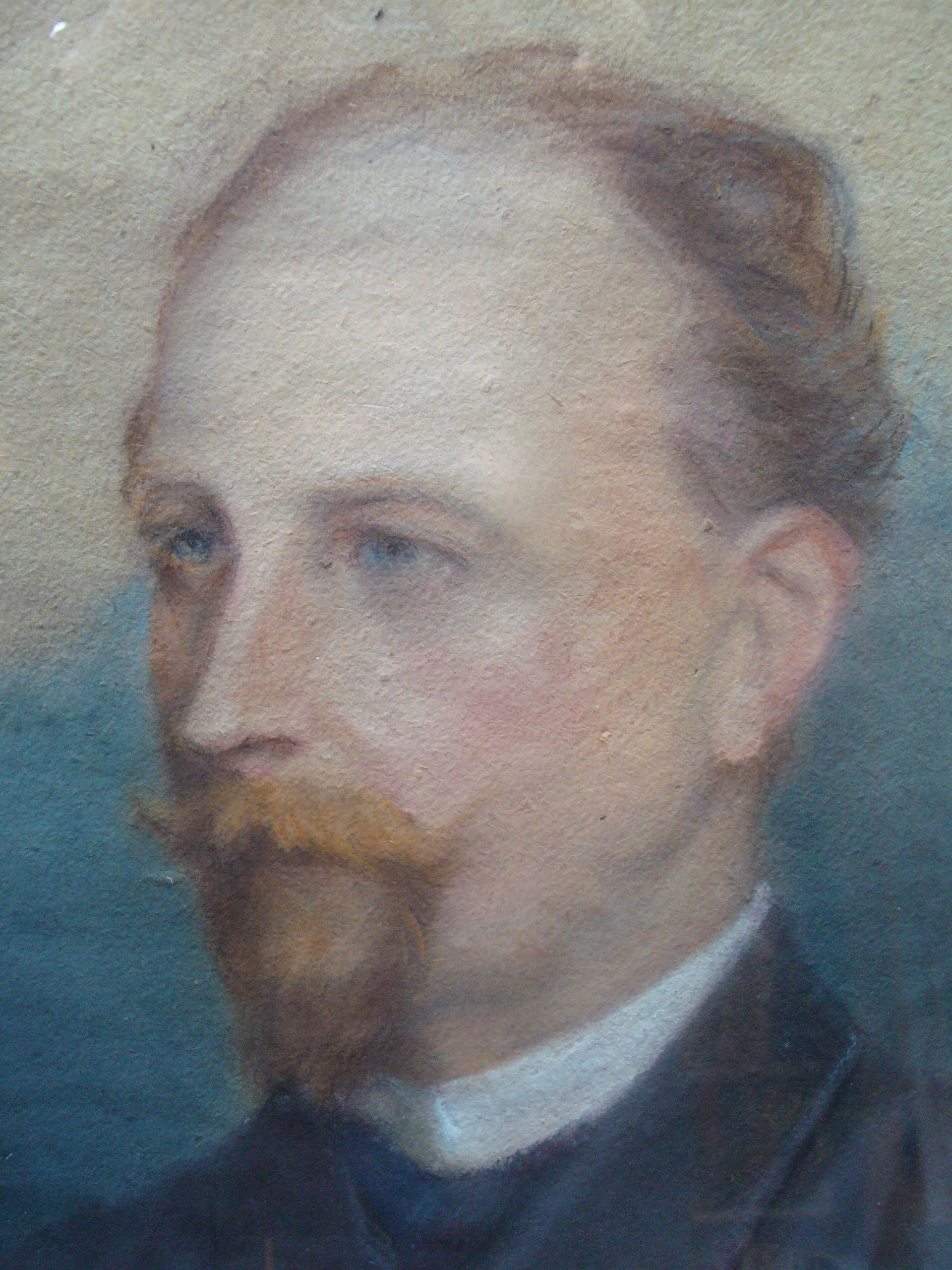
Grissell

Hartwell de la Garde Grissell (14 December 1839 – 10 June 1907) was a British convert to Roman Catholicism, papal chamberlain, and the founder of the Oxford University Newman Society.

== Education ==
Grissell was born in 1839 in Lambeth, Middlesex, the son of Thomas Grissell, a prosperous public works contractor. He was educated at Harrow School and in 1859 matriculated to Oxford University as a commoner of Brasenose College.

According to Walter Bradford Woodgate, a contemporary at Brasenose with Grissell and the founder of Vincent's Club (of which Grissell was a member), he was "a non-athlete, but ... popular". During his time at University Grissell came under the influence of the leading tractarian, Dr. Henry Parry Liddon. He became increasingly involved with the Anglican High Church movement and was admitted to the Brotherhood of the Holy Trinity, a movement to promote High Church principles within the University.

== Conversion ==
At Oxford, Grissell also developed a strong interest in ecclesiastical ritual. He came to believe that the Book of Common Prayer had its roots in the Catholic liturgy and argued for greater ritualism in Anglican worship. In 1865 he published a work called Ritual Inaccuracies in which he attempted to "bring the rubrics of the Protestant Communion Service into line with those of the Roman Missal". Reminiscing about this period of his life he wrote:

I soon came to the conclusion myself that this exhumation of scraps and snatches of an ancient rite, and the profane distortion of the rubrics of the Roman Missal for the disguise of Protestant worship was little better than an imposture.

Whilst working on his book, Grissell came into contact with a number of Catholic priests and developed a leaning towards Roman Catholicism. Under the direction of Fr. Edward Caswall, a priest of the Birmingham Oratory, Grissell began to read Catholic works. Writing in the year of his death, he recalled his conversion:

I came, after careful study of the question, to the conclusion that the Church of England, being purely a national Church, could hardly be considered Catholic and universal, in the sense of its being the Divine teacher of all nations, and that it was in schism … Prayer at length obtained for me the inestimable happiness of submitting myself to the Church, and of obtaining thereby the full certitude of my possessing undoubted and valid sacraments, and the enjoyment of that peace on earth which the true old faith can alone assure.

Grissell was received into the Catholic Church on 2 March 1868 by Henry Edward Manning, the Archbishop of Westminster.

== Papal Chamberlain ==
In 1869, he moved to Rome, where he served as Cameriere (a Chamberlain of Honour) to Pope Pius IX. The Cameriere wore a Spanish-style costume with cape and sword and had the duty of attending upon the pope during ecclesiastical and state functions. With his love of ritual Grissell relished life at the papal court. Writing in later life he reminisced:

Having had the privilege for a period of some thirty-five years of being Chamberlain to three successive Pontiffs, [I have] many diaries … These many interesting reminiscences include an Œcumenical Council, four Jubilees, three Canonizations, two Papal Consecrations of Bishops, many Consistories (including those at which Cardinals Manning, Howard, and Newman received their hats), a Blessing of the Golden Rose, and of the Ducal Sword and Cap, an 'Anno Santo,' two Conclaves, and two Coronations, as well as many pilgrimages and visits of Sovereigns to His Holiness.

The temporal power of the pope ended in 1870, when Victor Emmanuel II seized Rome, but Grissell continued to serve under Pius IX and his two immediate successors, Leo XIII and Pius X. He was rewarded for his service by being created a Knight Commander of the Order of St. Gregory the Great and, in 1898, one of the four Papal Chamberlains di numero, an honour usually reserved to the Roman nobility. Writing from Rome in 1900, Oscar Wilde referred to Grissell as a stalwart of the conservative Papal Court:

We came to Rome on Holy Thursday ... and yesterday, to the terror of Grissell and all the Papal Court, I appeared in the front rank of the pilgrims in the Vatican, and got the blessing of the Holy Father – a blessing they would have denied me.

He was wonderful as he was carried past me on his throne—not of flesh and blood, but a white soul robed in white and an artist as well as a saint-the only instance in history, if the newspapers are to be believed. I have seen nothing like the extraordinary grace of his gestures as he rose, from moment to moment, to bless-possibly the pilgrims, but certainly me.

Whilst residing in Rome Grissell amassed a vast collection of relics and sacred curios, including a portion of the Crown of Thorns and the entire body of St. Pacificus. The centrepiece of the collection was the reputedly miraculous image of the Madonna called 'Mater Misericordia' (now housed in the Oxford Oratory and popularly known as 'Our Lady of Oxford'), to which Pius IX granted indulgences at Grissell's request. Besides being an expert in matters liturgical, Grissell was a noted numismatician and was elected to a fellowship of the Society of Antiquaries of London.

For Oscar Wilde, Grissell was merely "the withered eunuch of the Vatican Latrines".

== Newman Society ==
The founders of the Newman Society outside St. Aloysius' Church, Oxford, 1878; standing, second-from-right, Gerard Manley Hopkins, fourth-from right, Grissell

When not serving at the papal court, Grissell resided at 60 High Street in Oxford. Here he set up a private oratory, which was frequented by many early convert members of Oxford University.

In 1877, he suggested the possibility of establishing a society for the University's Catholics and in the following year this idea the Oxford University Newman Society was founded as the 1888 Oxford University Catholic Club. Roman Catholics had only recently been readmitted to the University and their presence remained controversial. In 1883, Grissell was accused of proselytising and had to be escorted from Pembroke College whilst a mob of undergraduates hurled missiles and shouted 'No-popery' taunts at him. Nevertheless, Grissell continued to promote Catholicism within the University and he was influential in persuading Leo XIII to lift the papal ban on Catholics attending the English universities; this resulted in the foundation of Oxford University's Catholic Chaplaincy.

Grissell died in Rome on 10 June 1907, leaving his relic collection in trust to the Catholic Archdiocese of Birmingham, with the proviso that it be housed within a special chapel within the church of St. Aloysius Gonzaga in Oxford. He also bequeathed a notable collection of papal coins to the Ashmolean Museum.

To mark the centenary of his death in 2007, the Oxford University Newman Society mounted an exhibition commemorating his life and times, which was held in his Oxford alma mater, Brasenose College.
