= Non serviam =

Latin phrase for "I will not serve"

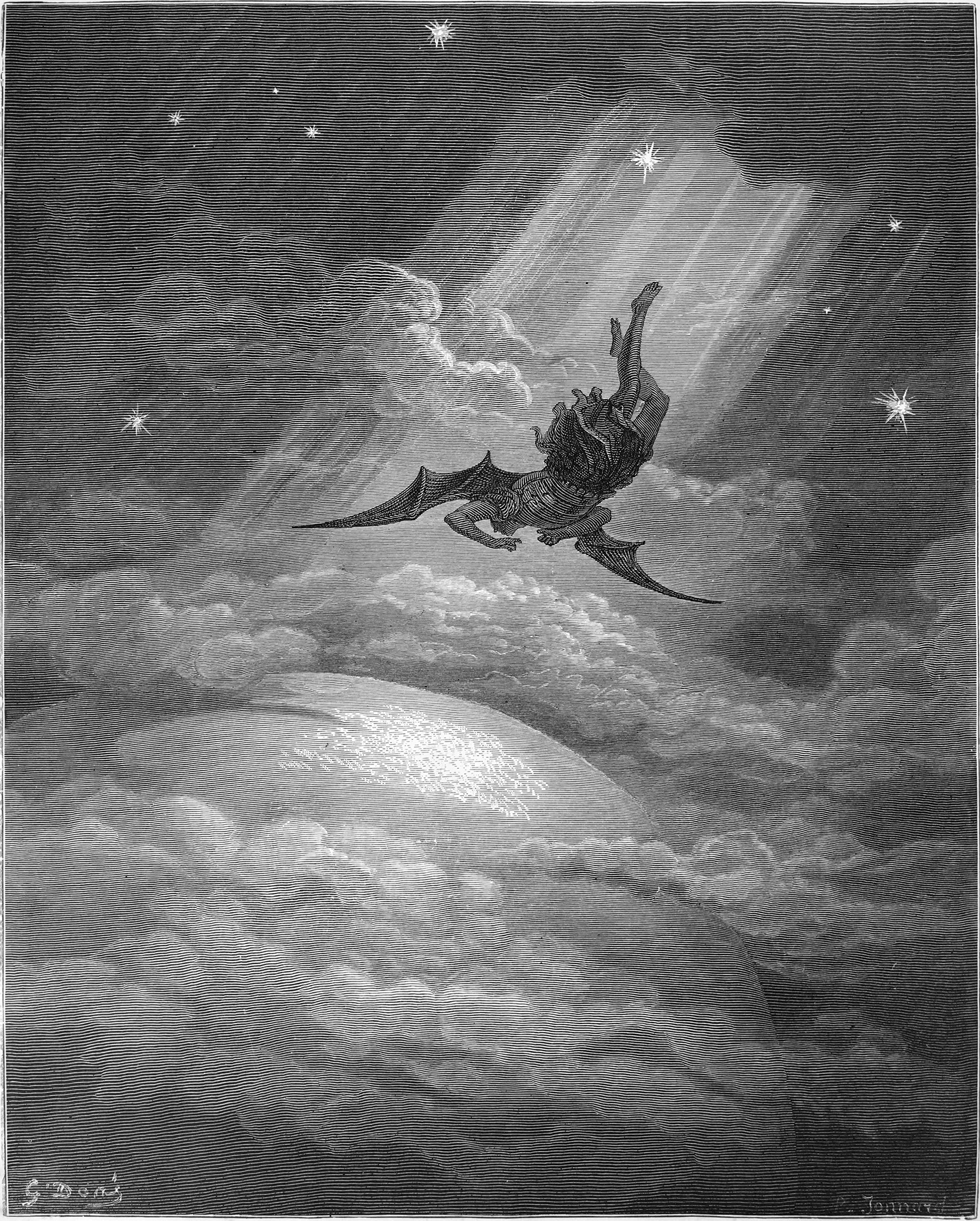
Gustave Doré's illustration of Paradise Lost by John Milton, portraying Lucifer's fall from heaven due to his refusal to serve God

Non serviam is Latin for "I will not serve". The phrase is traditionally attributed to Satan, who is thought to have spoken these words as a refusal to serve God in Heaven. Today, it is used as a motto by a number of political, cultural, and religious groups to express their wish to rebel, or simply not serve. It may be used to express a radical view against established beliefs and organizational structures accepted as the status quo.

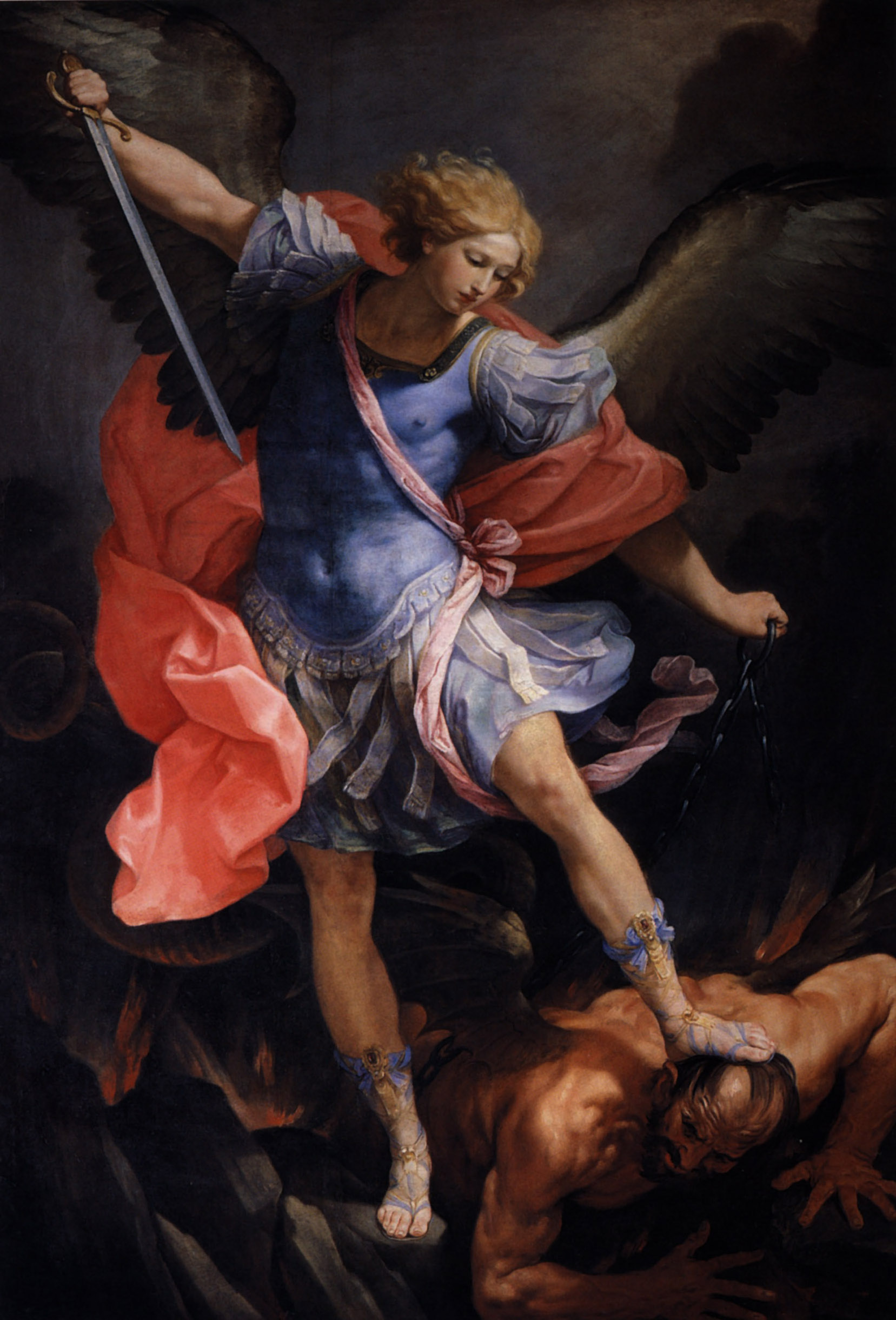
“Serviam!” was the cry of St. Michael in response to Lucifer

Its variant Serviam ("I will serve") was the cry of St. Michael the Archangel in response to Lucifer's "Non serviam" when God put the angels to the test.

== Use ==
In the Latin Vulgate, Jeremiah laments that the people of Israel speak "non serviam" to express their rejection of God (Jeremiah 2:20). This is the only appearance of the phrase in the Vulgate.

In James Joyce's A Portrait of the Artist as a Young Man, Stephen Dedalus says "I will not serve that in which I no longer believe whether it call itself my home, my fatherland or my church: and I will try to express myself in some mode of life or art as freely as I can and as wholly as I can, using for my defence the only arms I allow myself to use – silence, exile, and cunning." In a climactic moment of Ulysses, Dedalus is confronted in a brothel by an apparition of his dead mother, urging him to repent and avoid "the fire of hell." He cries out "Ah non, par exemple! The intellectual imagination! With me all or not at all. Non serviam! (...) No! No! No! Break my spirit all of you if you can! I'll bring you all to heel!"

In modern times, "non serviam" has developed into a general phrase used to express radical, sometimes even revolutionary rejection of conformity, not necessarily limited to religious matters and as expressed in modern literary adaptations of the motto.

Non Serviam was the third single released from Frank Turner's No. 1 Album FTHC.

It is also the name of a French underground extreme music collective.

Non Serviam is also the title of a Stanislaw Lem short story that appears in his collection A Perfect Vacuum. In it two groups of AIs (called personoids) in a simulated computer based world debate whether or not it's worthwhile to worship (serve) the scientist who created them. In turn the scientist, Professor Dobb, questions what, if anything, he owes to the personoids he created.
