= Buckley, Flintshire =

Town and community in Flintshire, Wales

Buckley: Welsh: Bwcle
- Town and community
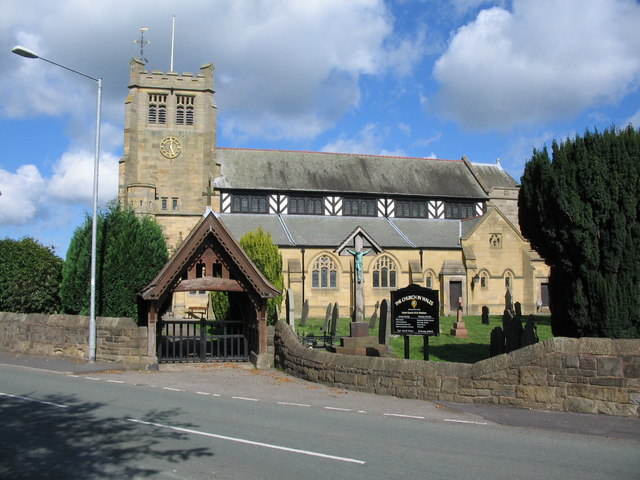
- The Parish Church of St Matthew, Buckley, consecrated in 1822

- Location within Flintshire
- Population: 16,127 (2021)
- OS grid reference: SJ274645
- Community: Buckley
- Principal area: Flintshire
- Preserved county: Clwyd
- Country: Wales
- Sovereign state: United Kingdom
- Settlements: List: Alltami; Buckley; Burntwood; Drury; Little Mountain; Padeswood
- Post town: BUCKLEY
- Postcode district: CH7
- Dialling code: 01244
- Police: North Wales
- Fire: North Wales
- Ambulance: Welsh
- UK Parliament: Alyn and Deeside
- Senedd Cymru – Welsh Parliament: Alyn and Deeside
- Website: Town council website
- List of places UK Wales Flintshire 53.172°N 3.086°W Map of the community

Buckley (Welsh: Bwcle [ˈbʊklɛ]) is a town and community in Flintshire, North East Wales, two miles (3 km) from the town of Mold and contiguous with the villages of Ewloe, Alltami and Mynydd Isa. It is on the A549 road, with the larger A55 road passing nearby.

Buckley is the second-largest town in Flintshire in terms of population. At the 2021 census, its community had a population of 16,135.

== Toponymy ==
Buckley's name appears as Bocleghe in 1198 and Bokkeley in 1294. It may mean "clearing of the bucks", from Old English bucc lēah; however, the preponderance of an O vowel in historical forms suggests that the first element could instead be a personal name, Bocca. Another contender is bōca, meaning "beeches", but the fact that beech trees weren't introduced into North Wales until the 18th century argues against this.

== History ==
In medieval times the area was part of three manors and lordships: Mold, Hawarden, and Ewloe. In 1420, Henry V presented Ewloe and the pasturage of Buckley to his wife, Catherine of Valois, as a wedding present. It was worth £26 per annum.

The town became an industrial heartland for pottery and coal mining between the 17th and 19th centuries. The first was opened in 1737. However, it only grew into any kind of prominence during the Industrial Revolution of the 18th century, when coal and clay were extensively mined there, and the name Buckley became synonymous with the production of various fire-clay and pottery products. By the early 19th century, there were 14 potteries in the town.

Buckley was a popular location for mining, as there were many faults in local rock formations that allowed seams of coal to be mined directly from the surface. Its heavy, clay soil also allowed for excellent pottery and bricks to be manufactured. Bricks from Buckley were transported all across the United Kingdom and as far as the United States, as Buckley became a brick working centre. A great deal of people moved into the area, particularly from Ireland and Liverpool to find work in the mining and brick industries, giving the town a distinctive accent. Many pottery and earthenware products manufactured were taken on the backs of donkeys to either Chester market or exported via the River Dee, as early as the reign of Elizabeth I. The last pottery kiln was fired in 1946. The site of the brickworks is now being redeveloped as a housing estate. However, a local cement works is still in operation.

In 1932, a tradition started in Buckley of running an annual pantomime. Dennis Griffiths produced a version of Dick Whittington in 1933, and ran the pantomime for 27 years, famously using the programme to invite any and all complaints to arrive written "on the back of a 10 shilling note (non-returnable)".

In the Second World War, a Nazi German Luftwaffe plane, most likely on its way to blitz Liverpool, was shot down and crash landed in a nearby district, with the plane's engine crashing into a small lake known locally as 'The Trap'. The pilot survived, captured by a Special Constable, Peter Griffiths, and taken to Hawarden Prisoner of War camp.

== Governance ==
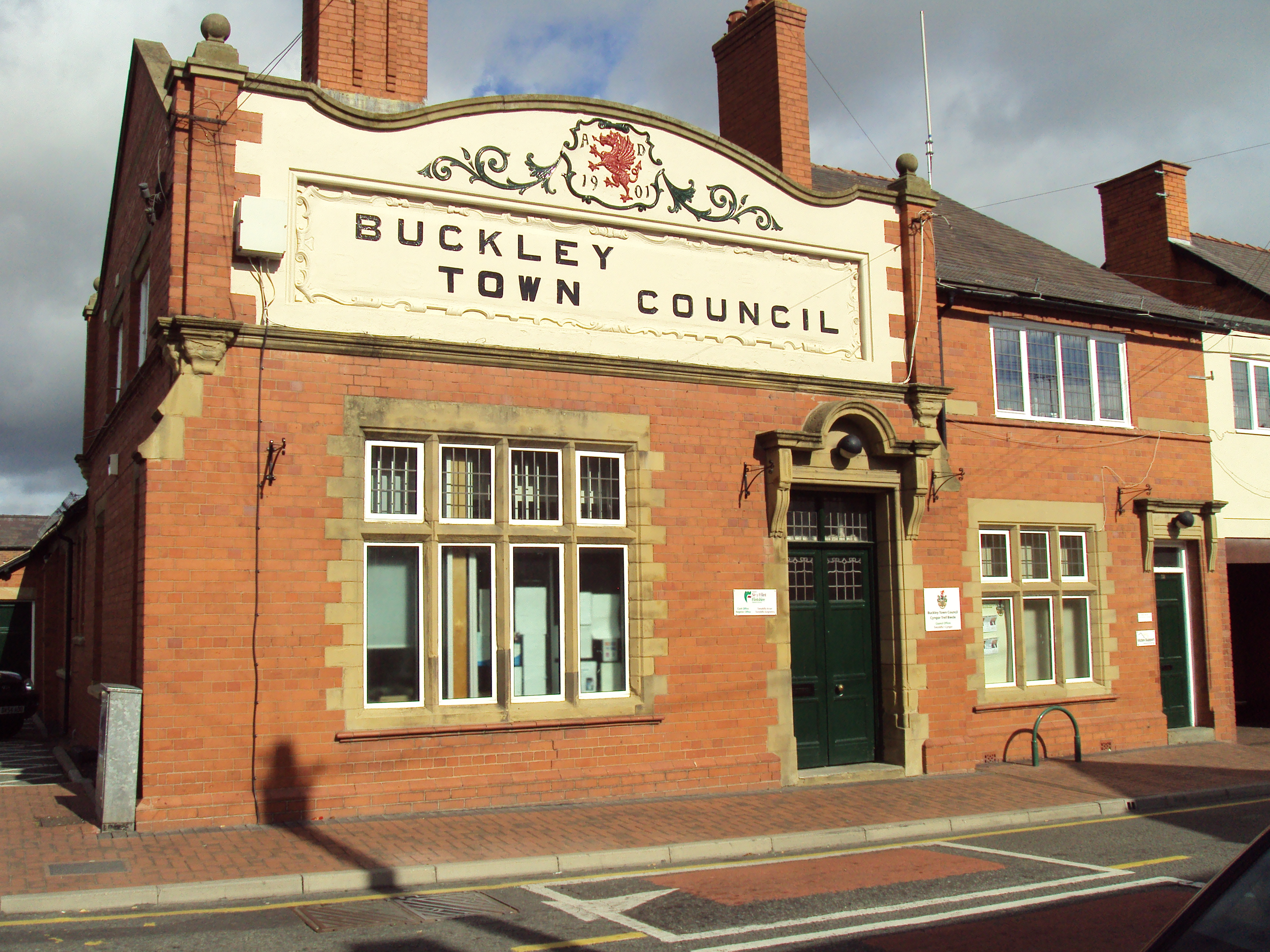
Buckley Council Offices

Urban district status was conferred on the town in 1898; at this time, the area comprised two parishes, Buckley (1874) and Bistre (1844). The urban district of Buckley was formed of Pentrobin and Bannel (which was formerly a part of the parish of Hawarden), Argoed, and Bistre (the oldest part of the town). Wat's Dyke formed the western boundary. The urban district council was based at the council offices in Brunswick Road. Before then, it was divided between the parishes of Mold and Hawarden.

Today, Buckley Town Council consists of 20 councillors, elected from four wards. These are called Buckley Mountain, Pentrobin, Bistre East and Bistre West.

The same wards elect councillors to Flintshire County Council, one from Buckley Mountain, and two from each of the others.

Buckley is part of the Alyn and Deeside UK parliamentary constituency and the Alyn and Deeside Senedd constituency and North Wales region.

== Geography and climate ==
Buckley is situated in north east Wales approximately 6 miles (10 km) from the border with England to the East. Buckley is in the lee of the Snowdonian mountain range to the west and is therefore in a rain shadow area. Average annual rainfall in Buckley is approximately 700–800 mm (28–31 in) which is significantly lower than areas to the West of the Snowdonian mountain range. However, in comparison to areas in the East and South East of the United Kingdom, Buckley still receives a fair amount of rainfall. Since Buckley is located approximately 130–150 m (430–490 ft) above sea level, snowfall is more frequent in winter months in comparison to the lower lying ground in neighbouring areas.

Areas in the parish of Buckley outside the town centre include Bistre, Lane End, Padeswood, Buckley Mountain, Drury, Pentrobin, Bannel, and Alltami.

== Dialect ==
Buckley was a site in the Atlas Linguarum Europae (a Europe-wide survey of dialects), being selected as one the sites in Wales that only spoke English.

Although very few locals speak with a 'Buckley' accent nowadays, due to people moving in and out of the area, and with the proliferation of television and radio, a few of the town's older citizens still speak in a form of the strongly accented dialect, full of colloquialisms, and often unintelligible to outsiders. One of the last remaining pure 'Buckley' speakers was noted linguist Dennis Griffiths, a Buckley resident, who died in 1972, and whose books are the main repository and record of the dialect. A few examples (mainly phonetic) are noted below:

- Wunst every blue moon – rarely occurring
- Thou fries me to death – the limit of boredom
- A lick and a promise – a quick wash
- Fasen the fost un fost – fasten the first one first
- The daddy on um aw – the best of the lot
- Husht thee naise – be quiet
- I conna meke thee out – I can't understand you
- Chunner – Complain

The last 'pure' speaker of the Buckley dialect was Joseph Charles Shone, a foundryman born in 1917, who died in 1987. An example of the Buckley dialect was recorded by community heritage archivist John Butler in 2016. In this item, long-time Buckley resident Margaret Shone recounts one of Dennis Griffiths's specially written stories, an adaptation of the Parable of the Prodigal Son into the Buckley dialect.

== Economy ==
The Hanson Cement kiln under construction in 2005

Today, Buckley has a population of around 20,000, and has numerous light industries. Those who cannot find work locally commute to Deeside, Cheshire, Wrexham and Merseyside.

The Heidelberg Materials cement works at Padeswood is the only large scale industry remaining in the town. Its 200-foot (60 m) kiln is now the major landmark on the skyline, visible from many miles away. Despite many locals considering it an eyesore, according to its website, the company has reduced pollution produced by the cement works by up to 90%.

== Community facilities ==
Buckley has a large area of common land, known simply as 'The Common'. It has a large playground for children, as well as a duck pond. A funfair visits during the Buckley Jubilee in the summer, usually on the second Tuesday of July, which is the town jubilee.

There is also a small lake, known as 'The Trap', which is stocked with coarse fish. A German Messerschmitt bomber crashed into the Trap during World War II, shot down by anti-aircraft fire after going off course following a bombing run over Liverpool. The land is primarily heavy clay soil. Etna Park, which is just a short walk from the town centre, is part of the Heritage Trail walk in the area.

Buckley has a shopping precinct, as well as three supermarkets, Aldi, Iceland and Home Bargains. There is a town-centre car park which is charged at 80p for 1.5 hours, £1 for 2.5 hours and £2 for all day. The town contains a wide variety of public houses, which includes the local working men's club. The local branch of The Royal British Legion closed in 2010 and has since been demolished.

== Education ==
Buckley has four primary schools: Westwood County Primary (Formerly known as West Lea infants and Buckley CP – juniors) which is on Tabernacle Street, Southdown Primary School on Linderick Avenue, Mountain Lane Primary School on Knowle Lane, and Drury County Primary on Beech Road, Drury.

Buckley has one secondary school, the Elfed High School, located near the Common on Mill Lane. The school includes a sports centre and a swimming pool, for use of both the students and the public. Many students from Buckley also attend Argoed High School, located in nearby Bryn-y-Baal, or the Alun School, in Mold. All schools in Buckley are run by the Flintshire Local Education Authority.

== Religion ==
Buckley is unusual in having two ecclesiastical parishes. The Church of St Matthew is the oldest parish church in the town, and was consecrated in 1822. Bistre Emmanuel Parish Church was built in 1842, despite appearing much older due to its early Gothic-style architecture. The first Primitive Methodist church in Wales is on the outskirts of Buckley, in Alltami.

The present St John's United Reformed Church was originally a chapel known as "Chapel in the Meadow", set up by a noncomformist pottery owner, Jonathan Catherall, in 1811. Before that date, Catherall had held services in his house which he named after Lord Hawkesbury. As the Church forbade chapels from having bells, he built a bell tower in the grounds of his home. The site of this unique non-conformist bell tower is marked by a mound and plaque near the skate park at the Elfed Sports Complex.

The Our Lady of the Rosary Catholic church in Buckley was built in 2000 to replace a much older building. Other churches in Buckley include Bistre Methodist, Pentrobin Methodist, Buckley Cross Methodist, Bryn Methodist, and Drury Lane Methodist.

== Culture ==
=== Events ===
Buckley observes an annual regional celebration and march that is over 200 years old called the Buckley Jubilee, which is celebrated on the second Tuesday of July. Officially, however, the Jubilee was begun in 1856. The difference in dates stems from the 'official' date being set when the Buckley Temperance Society first sanctioned the march. The Jubilee is a ceremonial march that begins on "The Common", a large area of common ground owned by the people of the town used for leisure and recreational purposes. The term 'jubilee' was first used in 1871.

A non-denominational Service led by the minister of the church or chapel leading the Jubilee that year is held on the Common, starting at around 3pm. The Sunday before the Jubilee, the leading church is presented with the Centenary Shield, which they hold for the year. A fifteen-minute service takes place, with two hymns accompanied by the Royal Buckley Town Band. The march then leaves the common, and marches through the town, with representatives from the local Sunday Schools, Scout and Guide troops, and many of the local schools. Banners from each of the local churches are carried.

=== Royal Buckley Town Band ===
Buckley has a famous brass band, the Royal Buckley Town Band. The band is one of only two in the entire United Kingdom to have received sanction from a British monarch to use "Royal" in their name. They lead the Jubilee every year.

=== Popular music ===
Buckley has one nightclub, the Tivoli Nightclub (known locally as "The Tiv"), on Brunswick Road. Formerly both a cinema and a music hall, the Tivoli has seen many bands play there over the years, including Uriah Heep, Black Sabbath and Led Zeppelin in the early 1970s, and many Britpop bands including Oasis, Ocean Colour Scene and the Super Furry Animals in the 1990s. It has been described as 'one of the finest quirky little venues of our time' and is featured in the DVD re-issue of Oasis's album, Definitely Maybe. Between summer 1992 and spring 1993, Radiohead played there twice. Bands such as Cast, Ash, Stiff Little Fingers, Fun Lovin' Criminals, Skindred, Hed PE and OPM have all played there. Since a renovation and rebranding in 2000, few bands played live at the venue, with the club music policy having more emphasis on commercial dance and pop music, with a rock night on Fridays. The venue attracts crowds from Chester, Wrexham, Manchester and Liverpool.

=== Radio ===
The town was also home to a community radio project which used to broadcast 'trial' or 'temporary radio' licences to Buckley, Broughton, Mold, Deeside and the surrounding areas. The station was known as South Flintshire Radio and its offices were found above the swimming baths on Mold Road. The station was heard on eight occasions between November 1996 and July 2000 as part of a campaign to bring a local radio station to Flintshire, following the demise of Mold-based BBC Radio Clwyd. The project helped pave the way for a permanent local radio licence which was awarded to Chester FM (known as Dee 106.3) which broadcasts to Chester, Ellesmere Port, Deeside and Buckley.

=== Library ===
Buckley has a sizable two-storey library, with the second level being dedicated solely to history and reference pieces, mainly on the local area. The second floor also doubles as the local museum.

== Sport ==
Buckley has a football club in the Cymru North league, Buckley Town F.C. In addition to the men's team Buckley also has a women's team, Buckley Town Ladies FC, who play in the North Wales Coast Women's Football League.

The Elfed Sports Complex was built in 2005, near the Elfed High School, and includes a swimming pool, which replaced the outdated, Victorian-style baths on the Mold Road high street.

== Transport ==
=== Road ===
Buckley is located on the A549 road, and is near the A55 expressway, which passes to the south of Ewloe. Buckley is part of a trial run to bring 20 MPH to towns all over Wales. This means most roads in Buckley are 20 MPH.

=== Bus ===
There are a number of bus routes that pass through Buckley, mostly operated by Arriva Buses Wales, which now means on most weekdays a bus to Chester or Mold is available every 10 minutes.

=== Rail ===
Buckley has previously been served by three different stations on lines operated by the Wrexham, Mold and Connah's Quay Railway and the Mold Railway. Many of the old lines and their features are traceable particularly within Knowle Hill Nature Reserve to the east of the town.

Today, Buckley railway station is a stop on the Borderlands Line, which runs from Wrexham to Bidston on the Wirral. It is operated by Transport for Wales. Trains run every 60 minutes, Monday to Saturday daytimes, and less frequently on evenings and Sundays. Connections can be made at Shotton, Wrexham General, and at Bidston for Liverpool. There are two platforms, one for each direction the line runs in.

=== Air ===
The nearest major airports are Liverpool John Lennon Airport and Manchester Airport, both around 45 minutes' drive away, although Hawarden Airport is a minor airfield nearby at Broughton.

== Notable people ==
- Frederick Birks (1894–1917), holder of the Victoria Cross for extreme valour in WWI.
- Cherry Dee (born 1987), former professional glamour model and Page Three girl.
- Claire Fox, Baroness Fox of Buckley (born 1960), writer, journalist, lecturer and politician, grew up in Buckley.
- Sylvia Heal (born 1942), former Member of Parliament, went to school in Buckley.
- Ann Keen (born 1948), politician and former MP for Brentford and Isleworth, went to school in Buckley
- Howell Elvet Lewis (1860–1953), known as Elfed, a Welsh Congregational minister, hymn-writer, and devotional poet, who served as Archdruid of the National Eisteddfod of Wales. Elfed High School is named after him.
- Blake Pelly (1907–1990), emigrated to Australia, became an air force officer, politician and businessman.

=== Sport ===
- Tommy Astbury (1920–1993), footballer with 303 club caps with Chester City F.C.
- Danny Collins (born 1980), footballer with 516 club caps.
- John Lyons (1956–1982), footballer with 195 club caps.
- Ryan Shawcross (born 1987) footballer with 375 club caps with Stoke City, grew up in Buckley,
- James Williams (1885–1916), footballer with 169 club caps, died on active service in WWI.

== Twin towns and sister cities ==
Buckley is twinned with Murata (Japan Tōhoku region Miyagi Prefecture).

== See also ==
- Buckley Town F.C.
- Elfed High School
- St Matthew's Church, Buckley
