= Hawarden Castle =

Hawarden Castle may refer to one of two sites in Flintshire, Wales, near the town of Hawarden:

- Hawarden Castle (medieval), a ruined castle (Hawarden Old Castle)
- Hawarden Castle (18th century), the home of William Ewart Gladstone, a former prime minister
