= Ann Keen =

British Labour politician (born 1948)

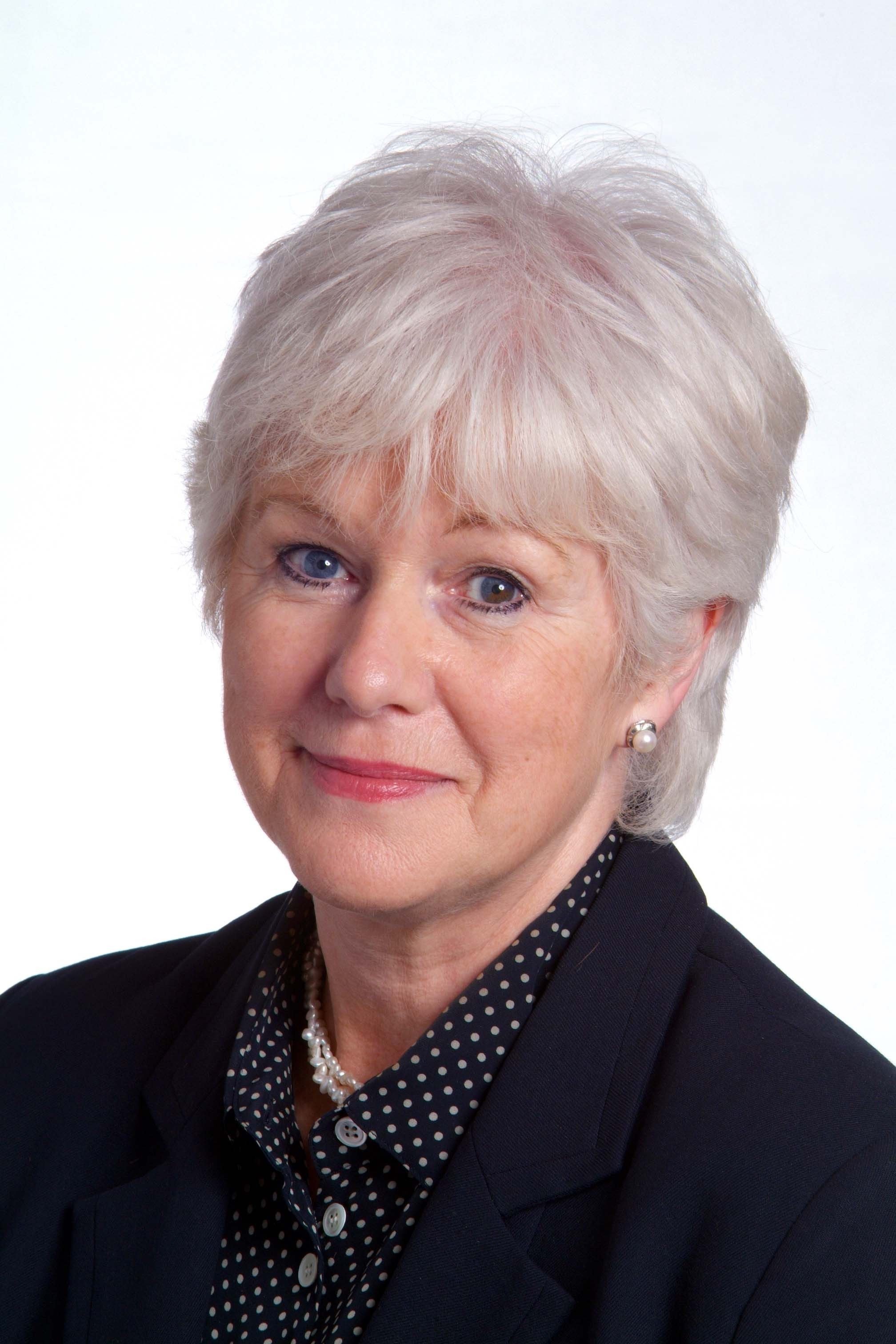
- Official portrait, 2007

Parliamentary Under Secretary of State for Health Services
- In office 28 June 2007 – 11 May 2010
- Prime Minister: Gordon Brown
- Preceded by: Gisela Stuart (2001)
- Succeeded by: The Earl Howe

Parliamentary private secretary to the Chancellor of the Exchequer
- In office 10 January 2001 – 28 June 2007; Alongside John Healey to June 2001
- Prime Minister: Tony Blair
- Preceded by: John Healey
- Succeeded by: Ann Coffey

Member of Parliament for Brentford and Isleworth
- In office 1 May 1997 – 12 April 2010
- Preceded by: Nirj Deva
- Succeeded by: Mary Macleod

Personal details
- Born: Ann Lloyd Fox; 26 November 1948 (age 77) Hawarden, Wales
- Party: Labour
- Spouse: Alan Keen
- Relations: Sylvia Heal (sister)
- Children: 2 sons, 1 daughter
- Education: University of Surrey
- Profession: Nursing

Ann Lloyd Keen (née Fox; born 26 November 1948) is a British Labour Party politician, who served as Member of Parliament (MP) for Brentford and Isleworth from 1997, until she was defeated by Conservative candidate Mary Macleod in 2010. She served as a health minister in the government of Gordon Brown.

== Early life ==
Keen is the daughter of steelworker John Lloyd Fox and Ruby Hughes. She went to Elfed Secondary Modern School in Buckley, Clwyd, then gained a PGCEA (Postgraduate Certificate in the Education of Adults) from the University of Surrey. She worked in the National Health Service (NHS) before training as a registered nurse at Ashford General Hospital in Ashford, Middlesex, and won prizes as Nurse of the Year and Children's Nurse of the Year. She later became a district nurse. From 1989 to 1993, she was Head of the Faculty of Advanced Nursing at Queen Charlotte's College in Hammersmith (now part of Thames Valley University) and she also served as General Secretary of the Community and District Nursing Association.

== Parliamentary career ==
Keen stood for the Brentford and Isleworth seat in 1987 and 1992 though was unsuccessful on both occasions. For the 1997 election she was again selected, on this occasion through an all-women shortlist. This method of selection was declared unlawful in January 1996 as it breached sex discrimination laws. Despite the ruling she remained in place as the candidate for the 1997 general election, when she became an MP defeating Conservative MP Nirj Deva.

Keen's first role in Parliament came in 1999 when she was appointed as parliamentary private secretary to Frank Dobson, Secretary of State for Health, though this appointment lasted less than a month. She then moved to the Treasury, later becoming Parliamentary Private Secretary to the then Chancellor of the Exchequer, Gordon Brown. In 1999, The Guardian newspaper revealed that she had acted as a "secret go-between" for the Labour Party and Shaun Woodward, at the time the MP for Witney, as he attempted to defect from the Conservative Party in the same year. In 2000 Keen became well known for campaigning on gay rights, her interest in the issue sparked when she was reunited with her gay son who she had given up for adoption. In the same year she also successfully ran a campaign to elect Michael Martin as Speaker to the House of Commons.

She was defeated at the 2010 general election by Conservative candidate Mary Macleod on a swing of 6%.

=== Health minister ===
Keen campaigned in parliament on health issues as a backbencher, and served on the health select committee. In 1998, Keen proposed an early day motion calling for equitable care for women with ovarian cancer, which was supported by over 100 other MPs.

On 29 June 2007, in Brown's first reshuffle as Prime Minister she was promoted to become a parliamentary under-secretary of state in the Department of Health, where her brief included NHS dentistry.

In 2009–2010, Keen led the Prime Minister's independent commission on the future of nursing and midwifery in England, which resulted in the report Front Line Care (Report).

=== Policies ===
==== Heathrow Airport expansion ====
On 28 January 2009, Keen voted against a motion in Parliament calling for a review of the decision to add a third runway at Heathrow Airport. Keen had claimed to be opposed to expansion at Heathrow for many years; her website stated in 2007 that "one of her most successful campaigns was against the Third Runway at Heathrow." Friends of the Earth said she had "betrayed her constituents."

=== Expenses ===
Keen and her MP husband Alan Keen used their combined second homes allowances to buy an apartment on the South Bank of the River Thames. The Waterloo apartment was nine miles from their constituency home in Brentford, a 30-minute drive from Westminster.

In 2009, their Brentford home was occupied by squatters after it was unoccupied for 9–12 months following a dispute with a building firm undertaking renovation work. In defending their part in the expenses scandal the Keens stated "we have advocated, strongly supported, and voted for the introduction of Freedom of Information legislation. We are pleased that the point has been reached when full details of MPs' expenses are being published on a regular basis for everyone to see".

A formal investigation into the Keens' expenses by the Parliamentary Commissioner for Standards ruled in March 2010 that the Keens had breached the expenses rules and that he regarded the breach of the rules as "serious", and involving "significant public funds". He suggested the Keens pay back four months worth of their claims – some £5,678. However, The Commons Standards and Privileges Committee of MPs disagreed with his findings and ordered them to repay £1,500.

==== Misuse of stationery ====
In May 2009 the Parliamentary ombudsman instructed Keen to repay £4,583 for sending unsolicited letters to her constituents. Keen invited them to coffee mornings using prepaid envelopes and on House of Commons headed stationery, a breach of Parliamentary rules as they are only permitted to be used for replies. Keen said the correspondence was sent by "a new member of staff ... on House of Commons instead of constituency stationery. When it was brought to my attention I immediately refunded the cost."

In April 2005 Keen also attracted criticism for using schools to distribute party political material to children's parents.

== John Taylor's failed legal claim ==
In February 2009 constituent John Taylor alleged Keen had breached her 'duty of care' to a constituent in failing to assist his attempts in achieving compensation for wrongful imprisonment. Keen was initially ordered to pay £15,000 in damages by a judgment entered in default, but the ruling was later set aside, with the judge stating there was no entitlement in law for him to bring such a claim. Keen said, "As an MP I deal with huge numbers of cases each year for my constituents, many of which have successful outcomes. "Unfortunately, some cases for a variety of reasons do not have successful outcomes. Despite trying my hardest for Mr Taylor for more than 10 years since 1997, this was one such case." The case was believed to be the first of its kind.

== Personal life ==
She married Alan Keen, who sat as a Labour MP from 1992 until his death in 2011, in 1980. Her sister, Sylvia Heal, also a former Labour MP, was one of three Deputy Speakers of the House of Commons under former Speaker Michael Martin. Keen has two sons and one daughter. In 1966, as an unmarried mother, she was forced to give up her son for adoption at his birth and was only reunited with him in 1997.

Parliament of the United Kingdom
Preceded by Nirj Deva	Member of Parliament for Brentford and Isleworth; 1997 – 2010	Succeeded by Mary Macleod
