= Gwenfron Moss =

Welsh pharmacist and missionary

- in 1980 as a deacon of Minny Street church
- Born: 27 July 1898; Coedpoeth
- Died: 10 August 1991 (aged 93); Wales
- Occupation: missionary

Gwenfron Moss (27 July 1898 – 10 August 1991) was a British, Welsh speaking pharmacist who became a missionary in China, India and Zambia.

== Life ==
Moss was born in Coedpoeth. She was educated at Grove Park School for Girls in Wrexham before she went on to train as a pharmacist at the School for Pharmacy in London. She had been a regular church goer and in London she attended the Welsh Congregational Church in King's Cross where Howell Elvet Lewis conducted services in Welsh. Her family adopted a girl named Hettie Edwards when she was nine. They became sisters and remain lifelong friends.

In 1921 she applied to be a missionary but the London Missionary Society chose Gwynne Beynon to be sent as a pharmacist to Shanghai. Moss became convinced of her calling at the Swanwick Missionary Conference in 1925 and she applied to the London Missionary Society. They arranged for her to train for two years at Carey Hall.

It was agreed that she would be sent to northern China and a service was held in Huddersfield to seal her dedication. The Revd. T.E. Thomas who had been her minister when she was a child at Coed-poeth came out of retirement to preside over her dedication in the home village.

She set sail on 23 August 1928 for China for Tiensin. She spent time in Beijing learning language before returning to work as a pharmacist at the Mackensie Memorial Hospital in Tiensin.

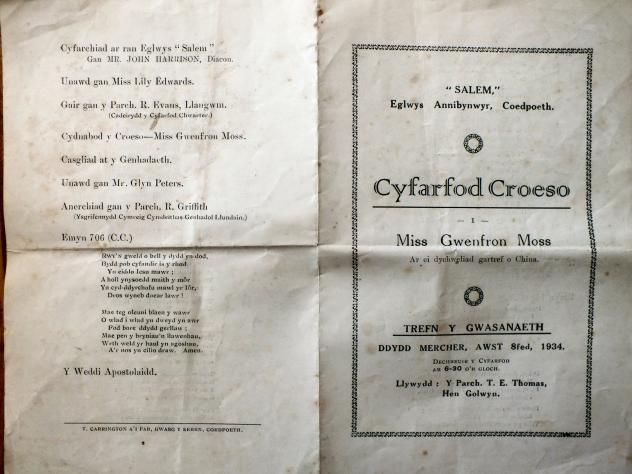
Cyfarfod Croeso Gwenfron Moss in 1934

The Reverend T.E.Thomas again conducted a service in Welsh in 1934 to welcome home Moss. She returned to China twice again, the first return was interrupted by the second world war. After the war she returned again until the new regime decided that all missionaries were persona non grata. She returned to Hetty, her adopted sister, in Cardiff in February 1951 and they had some time together. However, in 1953 she was approached and sent to south India where she took charge of textile goods. She arranged for the sale of crochet, lace and embroidery including some outlets in Wales. She worked in India until 1964 where she returned home via a four-month stay at Kawimbe Centre in Zambia.

Moss returned again to Hetty and died in Wales. Hetty died two weeks later. Her papers including her letters home from China and India are in the National Library of Wales.
