= Cherry Dee =

British model (born 1987)

- Born: Cherry Daniella Andrea Frampton; Buckley, Flintshire, Wales
- Other names: Cherry Dee; Cherry Baby
- Occupation: Glamour model
- Height: 5 ft 2 in (1.57 m)

Cherry Daniella Andrea Frampton is a former glamour model and Page 3 girl who posed under the name Cherry Dee. During her modelling career, she was featured in magazines such as Fast Car, Fit for Men, and Nuts and tabloid newspapers such as Daily Star, and the Daily Sport.

== Early life ==
Frampton competed in beauty pageants as a child, winning her first competition at the age of 10 months and going on to win Miss Wyre bathing beauty in Fleetwood at the age of two. She attended a modelling school run by Roz Tranfield in the Aldelphi Hotel, Liverpool and won over 200 trophies, including Miss Llandudno and Junior Miss Wyre when she was 12. She was also triple winner of the Miss Welsh Resort's trophy as well as Miss Millenium 2000. Frampton's aim was to compete for Miss Wales, but at 5 ft 2ins she considered herself too short and stopped entering competitions aged 14.

Frampton attended Elfed High School in Buckley. She passed all her exams and was considering a future in hair and beauty.

== Modeling career ==
When Frampton was 15, her mother, Corinne Limbert, was working at a sex shop called Private Shop, in Chester. Limbert met glamour models there and thought it might suit her daughter. She showed some of the models photos of Cherry six months before her 16th birthday and they encouraged her to try glamour modeling. Frampton was initially sceptical, calling it "seedy", but her mother persisted; "every day, I bought newspapers featuring topless models. 'They're only boobs,' I said, 'and the girls look amazing.'" Eventually, Cherry relented, saying "All you do is stand in your knickers and smile". However, Frampton's father cut off contact with her over her choice of career.

On the advice of the models her mother knew, Cherry sent some Bikini Shots into the Daily Sport. Shortly after her 16th birthday, she had her first topless shoot in Bolton with photographer Anthony Farnworth. While still 15, Cherry appeared in the Daily Sport, wearing a bikini and posing suggestively with a milkshake, in a countdown to her 16th birthday, when readers would be able to see her topless. She made her topless debut in the Daily Sport tabloid newspaper on 10 August 2003, two months after turning 16. At the time, she was employed by Buckley Town F.C. soccer club as its team mascot, but club directors dismissed her from the role when her topless pictures started to appear in the national tabloids. The club's chairman said that the club had no problem with Cherry posing in the club's kit, but when Cherry posed topless for a national tabloid and mentioned a connection with the club, and then appeared topless with players in a TV documentary, questions were raised by the Football Association of Wales, which wanted to know how a "minor" was connected to the club. Gwynn Williams documented the beginning of Frampton's glamour career for an On the Edge documentary that was first broadcast on HTV Wales on 8 January 2004.

On 1 May 2004, the Sexual Offences Act 2003 came into effect, which raised the legal permissible age for photography considered indecent in England, Wales, and Northern Ireland from 16 to 18. Frampton was forced to put her topless modelling career on hiatus until she turned 18, as newspapers and magazines decided on legal advice that glamour images could be seen as indecent. She also took the precaution of removing from her website all topless photographs taken before her 18th birthday.

As she approached her birthday and prepared to relaunch her glamour career, the media reported that she had insured her breasts for £1 million. After winning the Sunday Sport competition aged 20, Cherry's profile grew and she was soon featured in lads mags such as Fit For Men, and tabloids including Daily Star and The Daily Sport. In February 2007, she was named Miss Sunday Sport 2007. On March 18, a topless Cherry took part in a live web chat. In May, the Sunday sport released a perfume based on her smell, Frampton saying "Superstars like J Lo, Britney Spears, Paris Hilton and Jade Goody have all launched their own perfume so I feel honoured that the Sunday Sport has given me a fragrance of my own. I never thought I'd be so lucky as to be the face of perfume...I just hope that everyone enjoys having a sniff of Cherry."

== Retirement from modelling ==
In August 2007, at the age of 20, Frampton announced her retirement from glamour modeling, stating that she intended to devote her time to charity work in Africa. In a December 2009 interview, Frampton additionally revealed that she left glamour modeling because she felt pressured to take drugs and to pose for increasingly explicit photographs. She moved home to Wales and attended a hairdressing course at Deeside College (now Coleg Cambria) before going to work at Aston Hall nursing home, caring for the elderly.

== See also ==
- Lad culture
- Lad mags
