= Blaenycoed =

Village in Carmarthenshire, Wales

Coordinates: 51.9158°N 4.4028°W

Blaen-y-Coed
- Location within Carmarthenshire
- Population: See Carmarthen
- OS grid reference: SN348271
- Community: Cynwyl Elfed
- Principal area: Carmarthenshire
- Preserved county: Carmarthenshire
- Country: Wales
- Sovereign state: United Kingdom
- Post town: Carmarthen
- Postcode district: SA33
- Dialling code: 01267
- Police: Dyfed-Powys
- Fire: Mid and West Wales
- Ambulance: Welsh
- UK Parliament: Caerfyrddin
- Senedd Cymru – Welsh Parliament: Carmarthen West and South Pembrokeshire

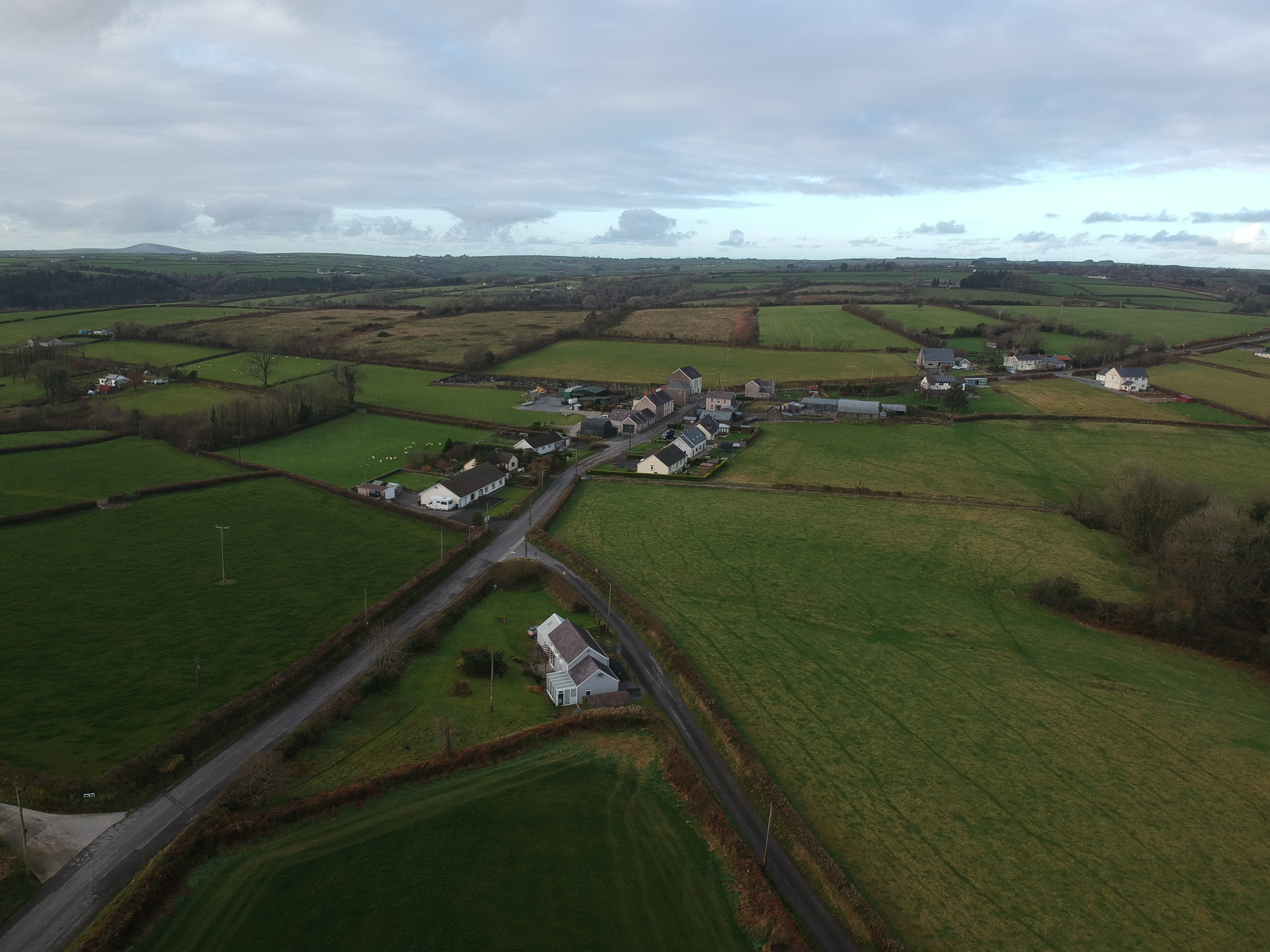
Blaen-y-coed from a drone

Blaenycoed, or Blaen-y-coed is a village situated between Carmarthen and Newcastle Emlyn, Wales, of 17 houses, a Welsh Independents chapel, a postbox and small farms. Blaen-y-coed literally translates to mean "Head-of-the-wood.". Woodland Rise is a camping and caravanning site in the village.

== Notable people ==
Howell Elvet Lewis, the Independent minister, hymn-writer, poet, known as Elfed, was born in 1860. The house where he was born, Y Gangell, is near Blaenycoed and contains a small exhibition of his life. His ashes were also scattered in Blaenycoed chapel graveyard.
