= Hawarden High School =

- Ysgol Uwchradd Penarlâg (Welsh)
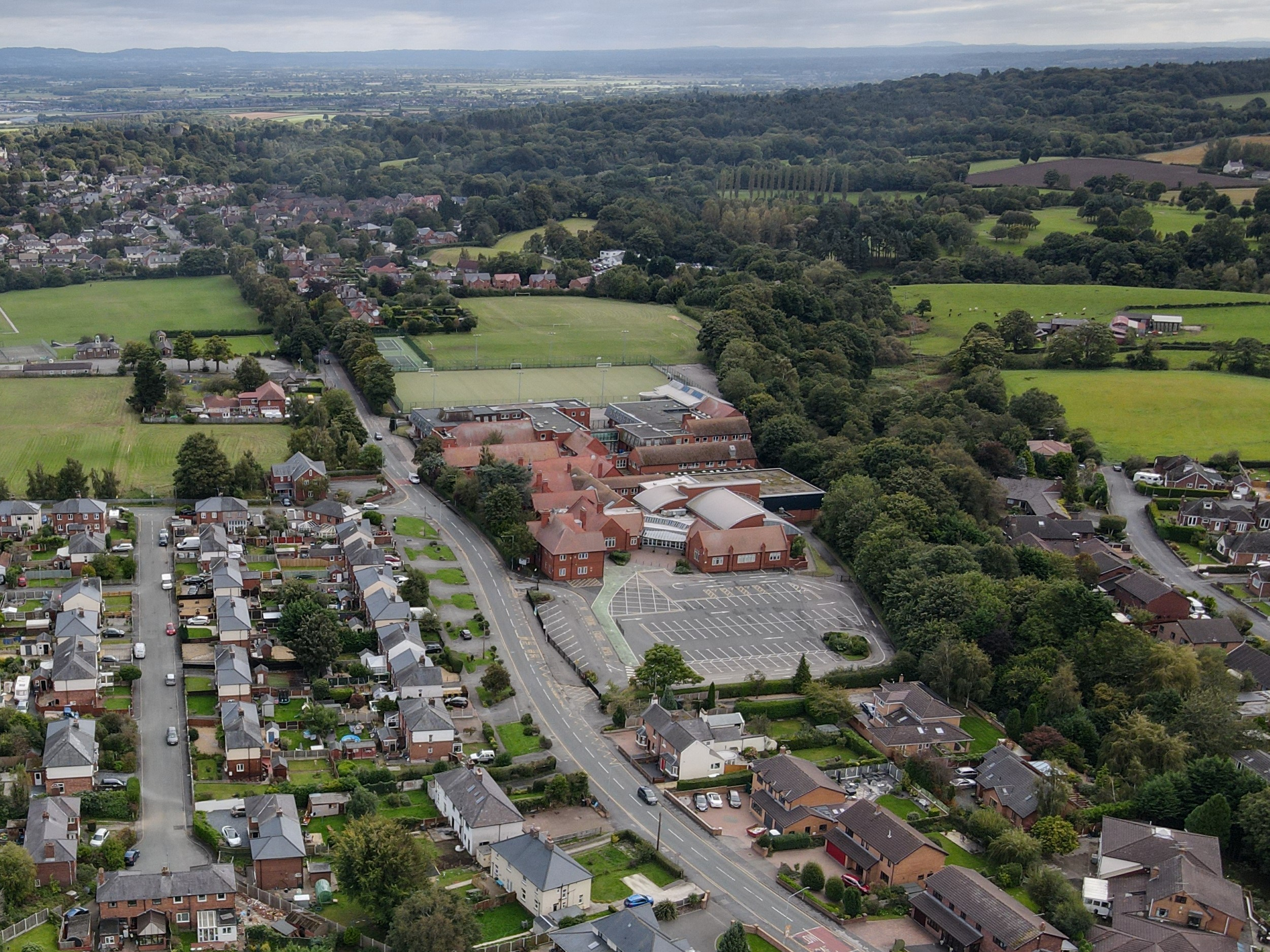
- The school from the north-west, in between Gladstone Park (left) and farmland (upper-right).

Location
- The Highway; Hawarden, Flintshire, CH5 3DN; Wales

Information
- Type: Secondary School
- Established: 1606; 420 years ago
- Local authority: Flintshire LEA
- Headteacher: Simon Budgen
- Gender: Mixed
- Age: 11 to 18
- Enrolment: Approx 1250
- Houses: Deiniol, Ledsham, Glynne and Gladstone
- Colour: Black uniform
- Founder: George Ledsham
- Website: http://www.hawardenhigh.org.uk/

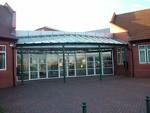
The school's main entrance

Hawarden High School (Welsh: Ysgol Uwchradd Penarlâg) is an English language medium secondary school in Hawarden, Flintshire, Wales. It is part of the Flintshire LEA. The school traces its history back to 1606 when a single-classroom grammar school was established with £300 left by a local resident named George Ledsham. The current building occupying this place was first built in 1898 by local architects Grayson & Ould and W&T Bailey, and was extended throughout its history. Located on the same site is a Grade II listed building, the School Library, the former Headmaster's House.

In 1998, the school completed a £4m extension which provided a new school hall, a sports centre extension, expansion of the Technology department and a new drama studio, as well as numerous other improvements. The extension was officially opened by Queen Elizabeth II in March 1998, on her visit to Flintshire.

In 2007, the school's headmaster, Mr M.C. Powell retired after over 25 years of teaching; his role was taken over by Mr R.J. Davies, who previously held the role of Headteacher at a secondary school in Wrexham. During 2009, as part of a celebration of the bicentennary anniversary of the birth of Victorian era, four times Prime Minister and Hawarden resident, Mr W E Gladstone, Roger Davies gave an interview to local community-heritage volunteer, John Butler. This was subsequently published by National Heritage Archive, Peoples Collection Wales. The school retained a rating of "Good" in its 2009 Estyn inspection with "Excellent" prospects for future improvement. Mr P. Ellis became the Acting Headteacher following the departure of Mr. Davies to an advisory post with Welsh Government. Ellis then became Headteacher for two years, and was followed by Mr S. Budgen.

In 2009, the school launched an investigation after a digitally manipulated video of its teachers dancing circulated online.

In 2015, Christine King, a senior teacher with 14 years at the school, was issued with a prohibition order by the General Teaching Council for Wales after being found guilty of 11 allegations amounting to serious professional incompetence.

The school currently holds a house system, started in 2015, containing four houses named after important local people; Gladstone, Glynne, the aforementioned Ledsham, and Deiniol.

In September 2018, the school faced media criticism for removing students with hair shorter than 0.65 centimetres from classes.

In October 2018, supply teacher Sian McIlhagga arrived to teach at the school as a supply teacher while under the influence of alcohol. Later that day she was caught driving while intoxicated by North Wales Police, for which she was fined £440 and banned from driving for 18 months. A misconduct hearing in nearby Ewloe took place in October 2019 where McIlhagga was banned from teaching for two years.

In August 2019, headteacher Mr S. Budgen said the A-Level results achieved that month were the best in the school's history, with the school ranked in the top 25% nationally.

In November 2019, the school was awarded a National Quality Award or NQA by the Healthy Schools Scheme, following a visit conducted in September. The scheme is a national initiative funded by Public Health Wales which recognises a school's commitment to health and wellbeing.

£55,000 of funding to boost capacity at the school has been offered by property developer Eccleston Homes as part of a bid to demolish the nearby Colettine Poor Claire monastery and build 15 detached homes on the site. The proposal came after a significant number of nuns relocated to Nottingham. In March 2020, the developer started an appeal to the Welsh Government planning inspectorate after Flintshire County Council refused planning permission.

The school was also the first host of the Flintshire Schools Pride Event, Arranged and organised by a mix of teachers and the students LGBTQIA+ ambassadors, the event was a resounding success.

== Notable alumni ==
A number of ex-pupils of the school have gone on to achieve notable success:

- Andy Dorman
- Ryan Hedges
- Michael Owen
- Gary Speed
- Danny Ward
