= John Lyons (footballer, born 1956) =

Welsh footballer

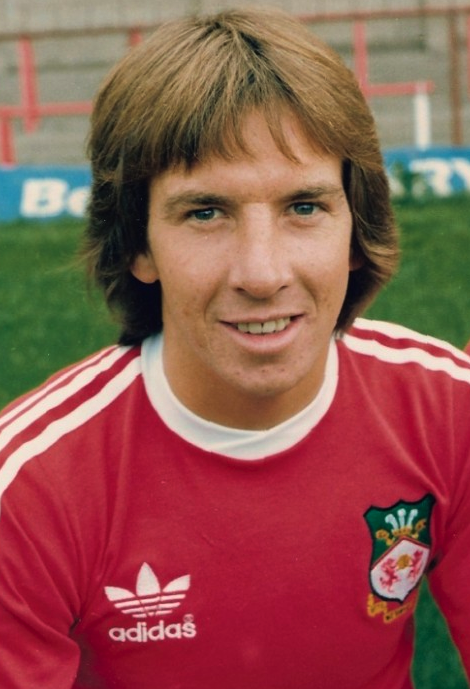

Personal information
- Full name: John Patrick Lyons
- Date of birth: 8 November 1956
- Place of birth: Buckley, Wales
- Date of death: 11 November 1982 (aged 26)
- Place of death: Layer de la Haye, England
- Position: Forward

Senior career*
Years	Team	Apps	(Gls)
1974–1979	Wrexham	86	(23)
1979–1981	Millwall	55	(20)
1981–1982	Cambridge United	21	(6)
1981–1982	Colchester United	33	(9)
Total		195	(58)
- * Club domestic league appearances and goals

John Patrick Lyons (8 November 1956 – 11 November 1982) was a Welsh footballer who played as a forward in the Football League.

== Career ==
Lyons was born in Buckley, Wales. He attended the Buckley County Primary School and Elfed High School. Whilst at the High School he represented Wales as an Under 15 basketball player. He began his football career with Wrexham as an apprentice and signed as a professional player in September 1975. He scored 23 goals in 86 appearances and helped the team to the Third Division title in the 1977–78 season. He joined Millwall in 1979, making 55 appearances and registering 20 league goals, many of which were from free-kicks just outside the penalty box, his speciality. He then signed for Cambridge United, where he appeared 21 times scoring 6 goals. He joined Colchester United for £25,000 and scored on his debut as Colchester defeated rivals Sheffield United 5–2 in front of the Match of the Day cameras. Lyons died by suicide at his home in Layer de la Haye on 11 November 1982 only hours after appearing for Colchester United at Layer Road.
