= St Matthew's Church, Buckley =

Coordinates: 53.1745°N 3.0726°W

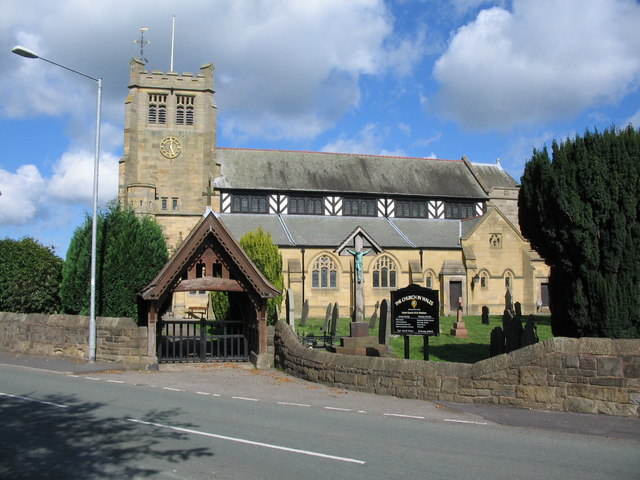
- St Matthew's Church, Buckley, from the south
- St Matthew's Church, Buckley
- OS grid reference: SJ 284,646
- Location: Buckley, Flintshire
- Country: Wales
- Denomination: Anglican
- Website: St Matthew's, Buckley

History
- Status: Parish church
- Dedication: Saint Matthew
- Dedicated: 1822
- Consecrated: 25 September 1822

Architecture
- Functional status: Active
- Heritage designation: Grade II*
- Designated: 11 August 1997
- Architect(s): John Oates, Douglas and Minshull (reconstruction)
- Architectural type: Church
- Style: Gothic Revival
- Groundbreaking: 1821
- Completed: 1905

Specifications
- Materials: Stone, with timber-framed clerestory

Administration
- Province: Church in Wales
- Diocese: St Asaph
- Archdeaconry: Wrexham
- Deanery: Borderlands
- Parish: Church of St Matthew, Buckley, with the Church of the Good Shepherd, Drury

Clergy
- Vicar: Reverend Jenny Clarke

St Matthew's Church, is in the town of Buckley, Flintshire, Wales. It is an active Anglican parish church in the Borderlands Mission Area, the archdeaconry of Wrexham and the diocese of St Asaph. The church is a Grade II* listed building.

== History ==
Built in 1821–22 to a design by the architect John Oates of Halifax, the first church on the site was a chapel-of-ease within Hawarden parish. The formulation of a plan for a new church on Buckley Mountain coincided with the passing the Church Building Act 1818, which made £1,000,000 available for church construction. This fund (known as the First Parliamentary Grant) provided the Buckley project with a donation of £4,052, which made up the bulk of the funding for the new church. St Matthew's thus became the first and only church in Wales to benefit from the act. Oates' 'plain but handsome Gothic structure' was largely replaced between 1898 and 1904, but a good deal is known about its character from a combination of documentary and structural evidence. It comprised a three-stage west tower, a structurally aisle-less five-bay nave, a short chancel, a north-east vestry and south-east baptistery. A few elements of this first church survive incorporated into the present structure, notably the lower stages of the tower and the former baptistery, albeit much altered.

In 1874 the parish of Buckley was created, and St Matthew's became its chief place of worship, though the church itself remained largely unchanged until the incumbency of Harry Drew (1897-1905), who in 1886 had married Mary Gladstone, daughter of the then prime minister, William Ewart Gladstone, of Hawarden Castle. In 1898 Drew initiated a rebuilding programme by replacing the north-east vestry with a larger building, containing both clergy and choir vestries, for which he footed the bill. The death of William Gladstone in 1898 provided the impetus to rebuild the chancel (1900-1901), which was dedicated to him, and paid for by his daughters Mary Drew and Helen Gladstone. In 1902 the tower was re-modelled, being reduced in height, refenestrated, and a baptistry created within it as a memorial to Gladstone's widow, Catherine, who had died in 1900. A porch was added to the south side of the tower; it became known as the Ruskin Porch, after John Ruskin, a friend of the Gladstones, because Mary Drew financed its construction through the publication of Ruskin's letters to her. The final phase in the reconstruction of the church was the replacement of the nave in 1904, which included the addition of aisles and a clerestory. The architects throughout the reconstruction were Douglas and Minshull of Chester.

== Architecture ==
=== Exterior ===
The church comprises a three-stage west tower, four-bay nave and choir in one with clerestory and side aisles, a polygonal chancel, south-west porch, south-east organ chamber and boiler room, and north-east vestries. The general style is Perpendicular Gothic with Arts and Crafts elements. Constructed of ashlar with a timber-framed clearstory, the building was originally roofed with green Westmorland slate, some of which has since been replaced.

=== Fittings and furniture ===
Douglas and Minshull designed most of the fixtures fittings and furnishings made for the reconstructed church. Of the wooden (mostly oak) furniture, the cabinet work (bench, alms boxes, notice board, umbrella stand, alter frontal cabinet) was executed by Guest and Wardle of Chester, while the carved work (font cover, litany desk, pulpit, lectern, clergy prayer desks, choir stalls, altar rail, credence, bishop's chair, and two prie dieux) is by Herbert Reed of Exeter; the altar table was made by the building contractors, Parker brothers of Chester. It was probably West and Collier of Hambledon, Henley on Thames, who supplied the nave seating of 1904-5 (rows of chairs linked in groups of six and seven and hinged to the floor).

There is a good collection of work by the Chester-based artist craftsman, Robert Hilton, including repousée copper altar cross and candlesticks; oak retable, altar desk, Epistle and Gospel candlestick pedestals and hymn board, all with repousée copper embellishments; a gold-embroidered red festal altar frontal incorporating enamels, and an oak prayer board with copper and enamel embellishments. Hilton's candlestick pedestals were designed to carry a pair of heavy brass candlesticks of c. 1850 designed by William Butterfield.

Below the clearstorey windows are murals of 1910 depicting the beatitudes. They were designed by Minshull and Muspratt, the successor practice to Douglas and Minshull, and painted by Robert and Henry Ellis of Chester. A pair of candlesticks was designed by William Butterfield. Much of the stained glass is by Henry Holiday; one of the windows in the north aisle is by H. J. Stammers and another is by C. Ford Whitcombe. The two-manual organ was built in 1905 by John Bishop & Sons of London. It was restored in 1959 and again in 1990. There is a ring of eight bells which were cast in 1902 by John Taylor & Sons of Loughborough and donated to the church by Mrs Drew.

== External Features ==
At the entrance to the churchyard is the Grade II listed timber-framed lychgate dated 1901 by Douglas and Minshull; it was built to commemorate the end of the millennium. Close to the lychgate is a Calvary, raised to commemorate the dead of the 1914-18 war, which was erected in 1921 by the stonemason Edward Thompson of Hawarden. At the bottom of the churchyard is Churchyard House, a brick construction designed by Douglas and Minshull in 1898 to house a wheeled bier.

== See also ==
- List of church restorations, amendments and furniture by John Douglas
