= Alltami =

Village in Flintshire, Wales

Coordinates: 53.182°N 3.098°W

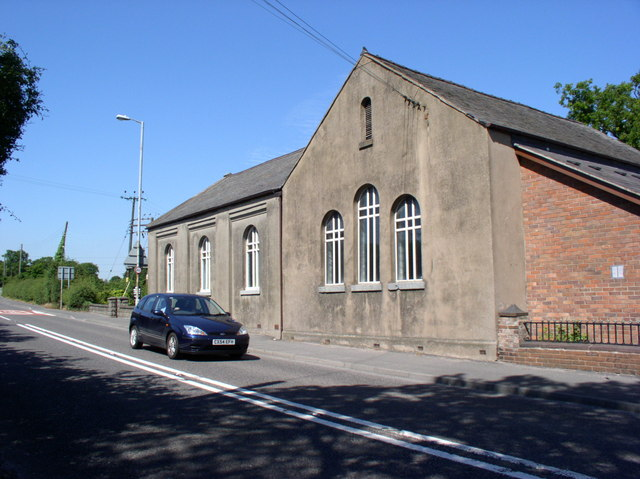
- Bryn Methodist Church, Alltami

- Location within Flintshire
- OS grid reference: SJ266656
- Community: Buckley
- Principal area: Flintshire
- Preserved county: Clwyd
- Country: Wales
- Sovereign state: United Kingdom
- Post town: MOLD
- Postcode district: CH7
- Dialling code: 01244
- Police: North Wales
- Fire: North Wales
- Ambulance: Welsh
- UK Parliament: Alyn and Deeside
- Senedd Cymru – Welsh Parliament: Alyn and Deeside

Alltami is a small village in Flintshire, in northeast Wales northwest of Buckley and northeast of Mold. It lies on the A494 road which runs from Ellesmere Port to Dolgellau. There is a stream running through the village, Alltami Brook. There is a crossroads at Alltami with traffic lights; they were proposed to be installed in February 1981.

== Landmarks ==
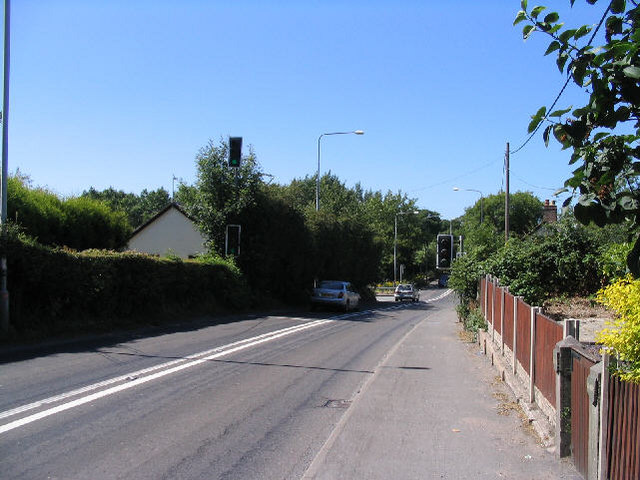
Traffic lights at Alltami

Alltami is the home of the first Primitive Methodist chapel in North Wales, Bryn Methodist Church. The church began during a summer camp at nearby Bryn y Baal in 1836, led by Henry Brining of Chester. A church was built at Alltami in 1838, and was extended at the end of the following decade to include school rooms. By 1933 the foundations began to be affected by Alltami Brook flowing to the side of the church, washing them away. The issue was resolved and electricity added the following year. In 1959 a kitchen was added and the Sunday School was reslated and decorated. The following year a new church porch was added, with a stained glass window and doors made of oak. New windows were further added to the main building in 1970. The current church was renamed in 1992.

Greenbank Farmhouse, at the end of Greenbank Lane off Alltami Road, became a Grade II listed building in 2001. It dates to the 1860s, when it was rebuilt and remodelled along with two other farms in the area, Ty'n y Caeau and Rhosychellis (now demolished), by the Soughton estate. There is one pub, The Tavern, in the village, which is listed in the 2016 Michelin Guide. Beaufort Park Hotel is situated along Alltami Road.
