= Buckley Town Council Offices =

Municipal Building in Buckley, Flintshire, Wales

- Swyddfeydd Cyngor Tref Bwcle (Welsh)
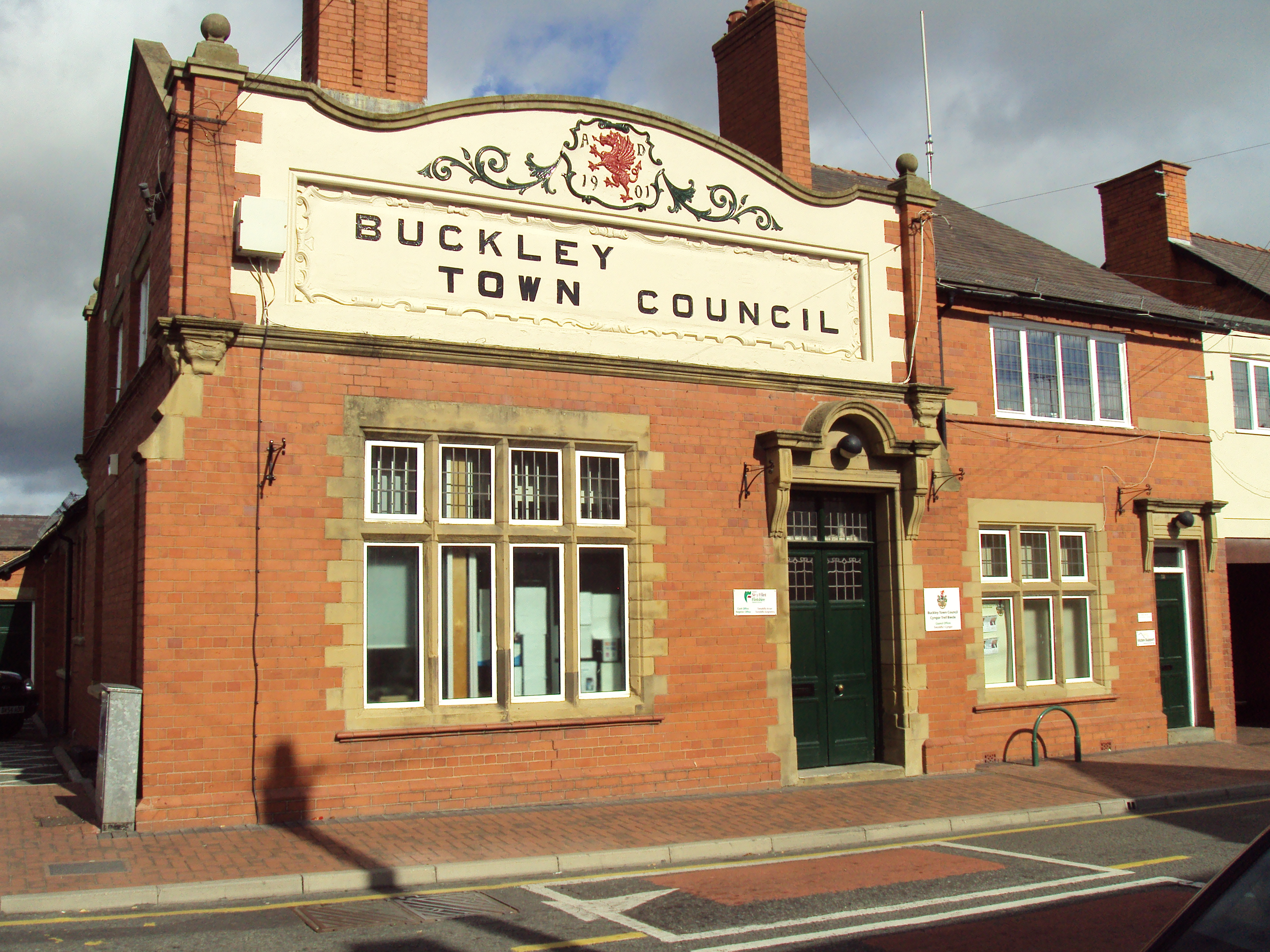
- The building in October 2009

- Shown in Flintshire
- 53.1684°N 3.0818°W
- Location: Mold Road, Buckley

History
- Built: 1901

Site notes
- Architect: Richard Cecil Davies
- Architectural style: Edwardian style

Listed Building – Grade II
- Official name: Buckley Town Council Offices and Library
- Designated: 14 December 2009
- Reference no.: 87599

Buckley Town Council Offices (Welsh: Swyddfeydd Cyngor Tref Bwcle) is a municipal building located on Mold Road in Buckley, Flintshire in Wales. The structure, which accommodates the offices and meeting place of Buckley Town Council, is a Grade II listed building.

== History ==
Following significant population growth, largely associated with the coal mining industry, an urban district council for the area was formed in 1894. In the late 19th century, the new civic leaders decided to procure council offices for their meetings. The site they selected, on the north side of Mold Road, was given to the council by a firm of corn merchants based in Chester, Robert Griffiths Brothers.

The council office building was designed by Richard Cecil Davies in the Edwardian style, built in red brick with ashlar stone dressings and was officially opened in October 1901.

Work on a Carnegie Library, financed by the Scottish American businessman, Andrew Carnegie, on a site to the east of the council offices started in 1902. The library was also designed by Richard Cecil Davies and was officially opened on 7 September 1904. The latter building was expanded to include a swimming pool, financed by the North Wales Miners' Welfare Fund, which was officially opened by Henry Gladstone in July 1928.

The building served as the headquarters of the Buckley Urban District Council for much of the 20th century, but ceased to be local seat of government when Alyn and Deeside District Council was formed in 1974. Buckley Town Council subsequently adopted the council offices as their offices and meeting place.

The library service relocated to a new library, museum and gallery complex in Brunswick Road in January 1977, and the swimming pool was superseded by a modern swimming pool at the Buckley Leisure Centre in Mill Lane in 2005. The council offices and the former library were linked together when a connecting block was constructed in the late 20th century. The former library was later converted into small business units. The building was grade II listed in 2009.

== Architecture ==
Both the council offices and former library are two-storey buildings, built of brick with stone dressings. The council offices are two bays wide, the left bay coming further forward and including the entrance with a canopy. Above is a painted panel with a crest and the wording originally reading "Buckley Urban District Council", now amended to read "Buckley Town Council". The ground floor windows have mullions and transoms. The town council chamber is at the rear. The library building is five bays wide, with a central entrance below a stone balcony. The balcony railings have a plaque attached reading "Public Library and Swimming Pool AD 1902". Above is a large clock with the painted wording "Buckley Silver Jubilee, 1910–1935". The clock was donated by Catherine Dobson, who was the daughter of a former councillor, and installed in celebration of the Silver Jubilee of King George V.
