= List of schools in Flintshire =

This is a list of schools in Flintshire in Wales.

== Primary schools ==
- Abbots Lane Infants School
- Abermorddu Community Primary School
- Brookfield Primary School
- Broughton Primary School
- Brynford Primary School
- Cornist Park School
- Bryn Deva Primary School
- Derwen Primary School
- Drury Primary School
- Ewloe Green School
- Golftyn Community Primary School
- Gronant Community Primary School
- Gwernymynydd Community Primary School
- Gwynedd Primary School
- Hawarden Infants School
- Lixwm Primary School
- Llanfynydd Community Primary School
- Mountain Lane Primary School
- Nannerch CW Primary School
- Nercwys CW School
- Northop Hall Primary School
- Penarlag Primary School
- Penyffordd Junior School
- Perth y Terfyn Infants School
- Queensferry Community Primary School
- Rector Drew CW School
- Rhesycae Controlled School
- Rhos Helyg Primary School
- St Anthony's RC Primary School
- St David's RC Primary School
- St Ethelwold's CW School
- St John the Baptist's CW Primary School
- St Mary's RC Primary School
- St Winefride's RC Primary School
- Saltney Ferry Primary School
- Saltney Wood Memorial Primary School
- Sandycroft Primary School
- Sealand Primary School
- Shotton Infants School
- Southdown Primary School
- Sychdyn Primary School
- Taliesin Junior School
- Trelawnyd Primary School
- Venerable Edward Morgan RC Primary School
- Wepre Primary School
- Westwood Community Primary School
- Ysgol Bro Carmel
- Ysgol Bryn Coch
- Ysgol Bryn Garth
- Ysgol Bryn Gwalia
- Ysgol Bryn Pennant
- Ysgol Croes Atti
- Ysgol Derwenfa
- Ysgol Estyn Community Primary School
- Ysgol Glan Aber
- Ysgol Gwenffrwd
- Ysgol Gymraeg Glanrafon
- Ysgol Gynradd Trelogan
- Ysgol Maes Edwin
- Ysgol Maesglas
- Ysgol Maes Y Felin
- Ysgol Merllyn
- Ysgol Mornant
- Ysgol Mynydd Isa
- Ysgol Owen Jones
- Ysgol Parc y Llan
- Ysgol Perth Y Terfyn
- Ysgol Terrig
- Ysgol Trelogan
- Ysgol y Foel
- Ysgol y Fron
- Ysgol Y Llan CW
- Ysgol y Waun
- Ysgol yr Esgob CW

== Secondary schools ==
- Alun School
- Argoed High School*
- Castell Alun High School
- Connah's Quay High School
- Elfed High School *
- Flint High School
- Hawarden High School
- St David's High School*
- St Richard Gwyn RC High School
- Ysgol Maes Garmon
- Ysgol Treffynnon

(*) Incomplete Secondary School which does not have a Sixth Form

== Special schools ==
- Bryn Tirion Hall
- Ysgol Maes Hyfryd
- Ysgol Pen Coch
