= Gladstone's Library =

Residential library in Hawarden, Wales

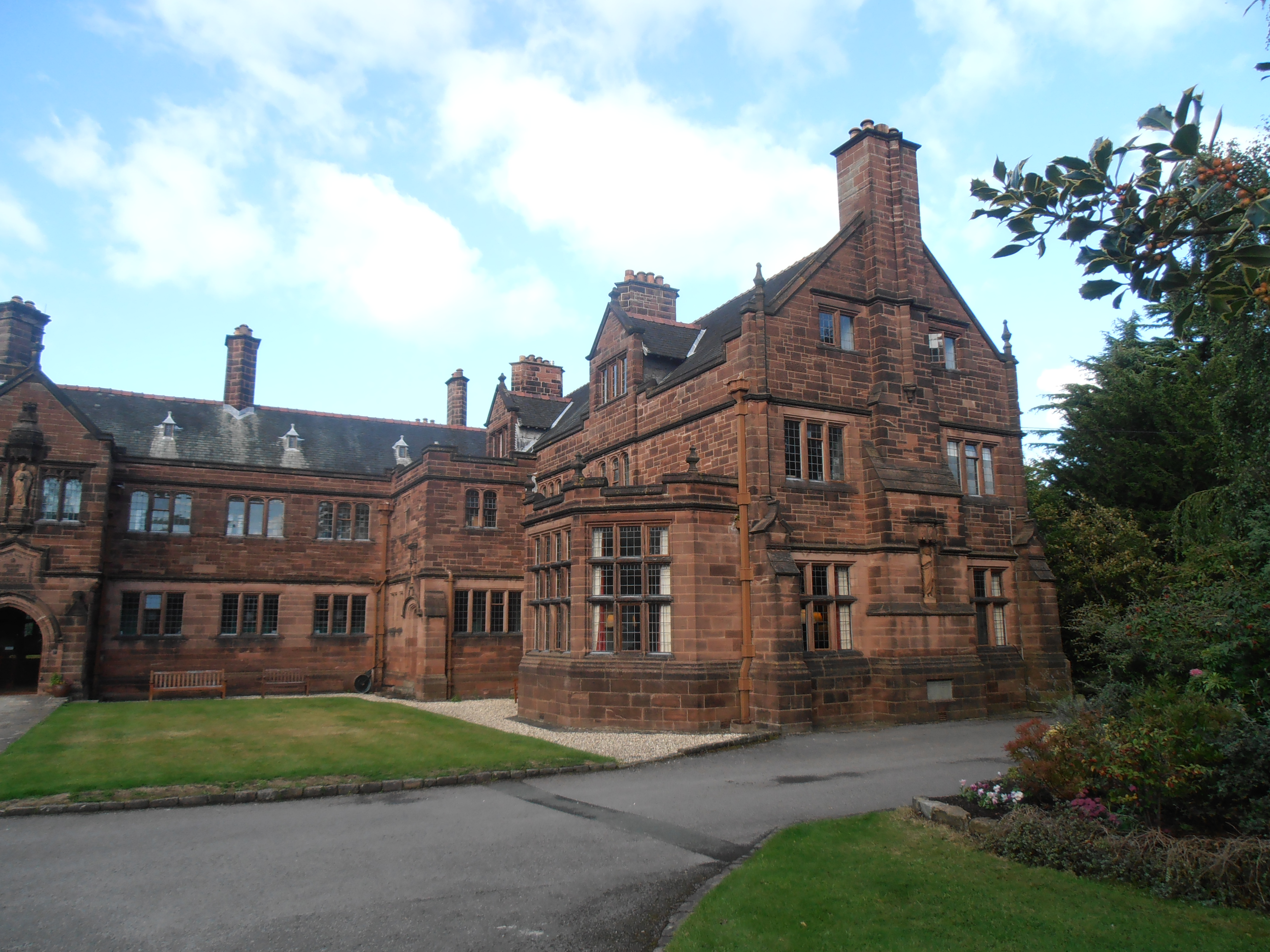
- 53.1859°N 3.0272°W
- Location: Hawarden, Flintshire, Wales
- Established: 1895; 131 years ago
- Architect: John Douglas

Collection
- Size: 250,000

Access and use
- Access requirements: Open to anyone with a need to use the collections and services

Other information
- Director: Andrea Russell (2023)
- Employees: 18
- Website: http://www.gladstoneslibrary.org

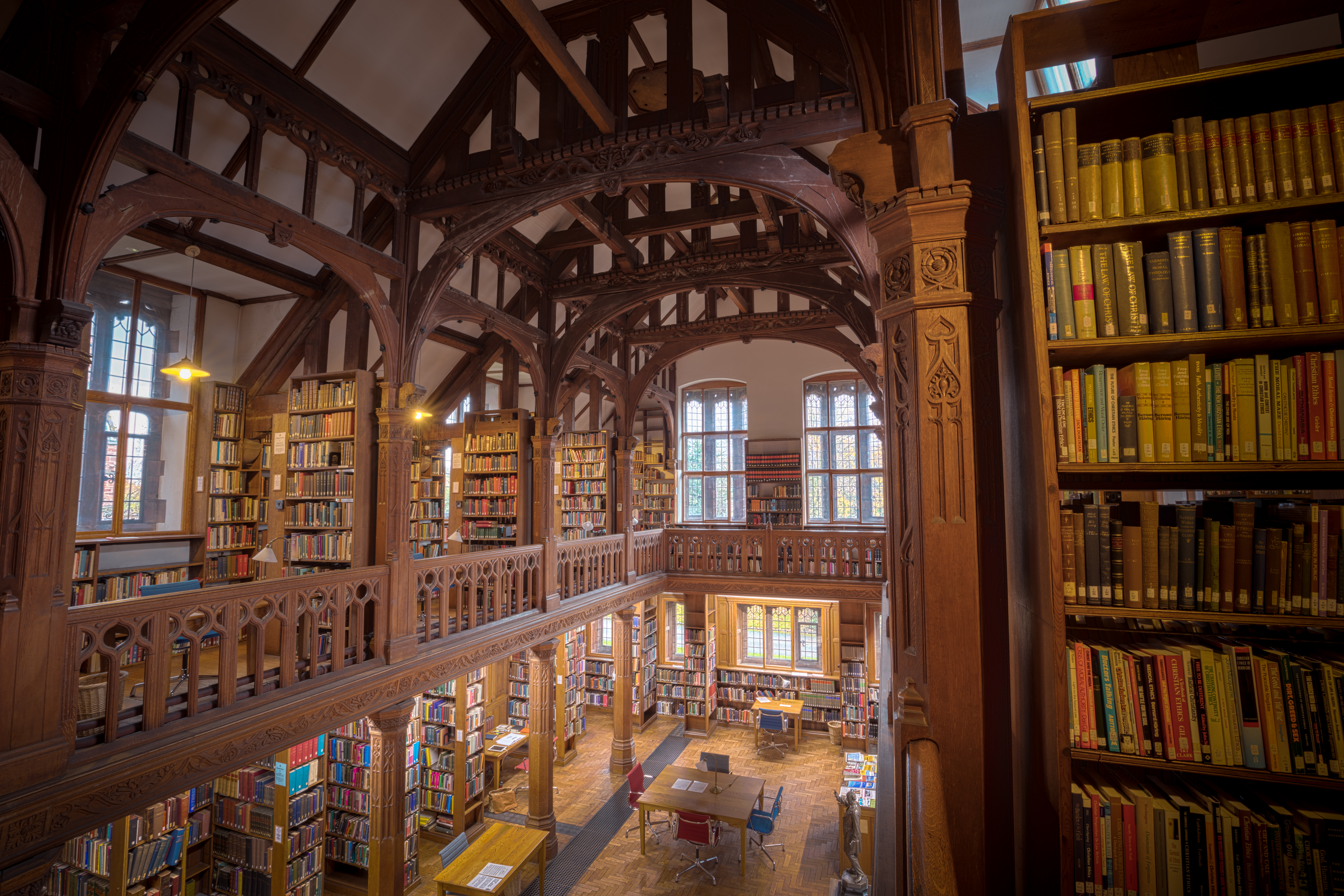
Gladstone's Library

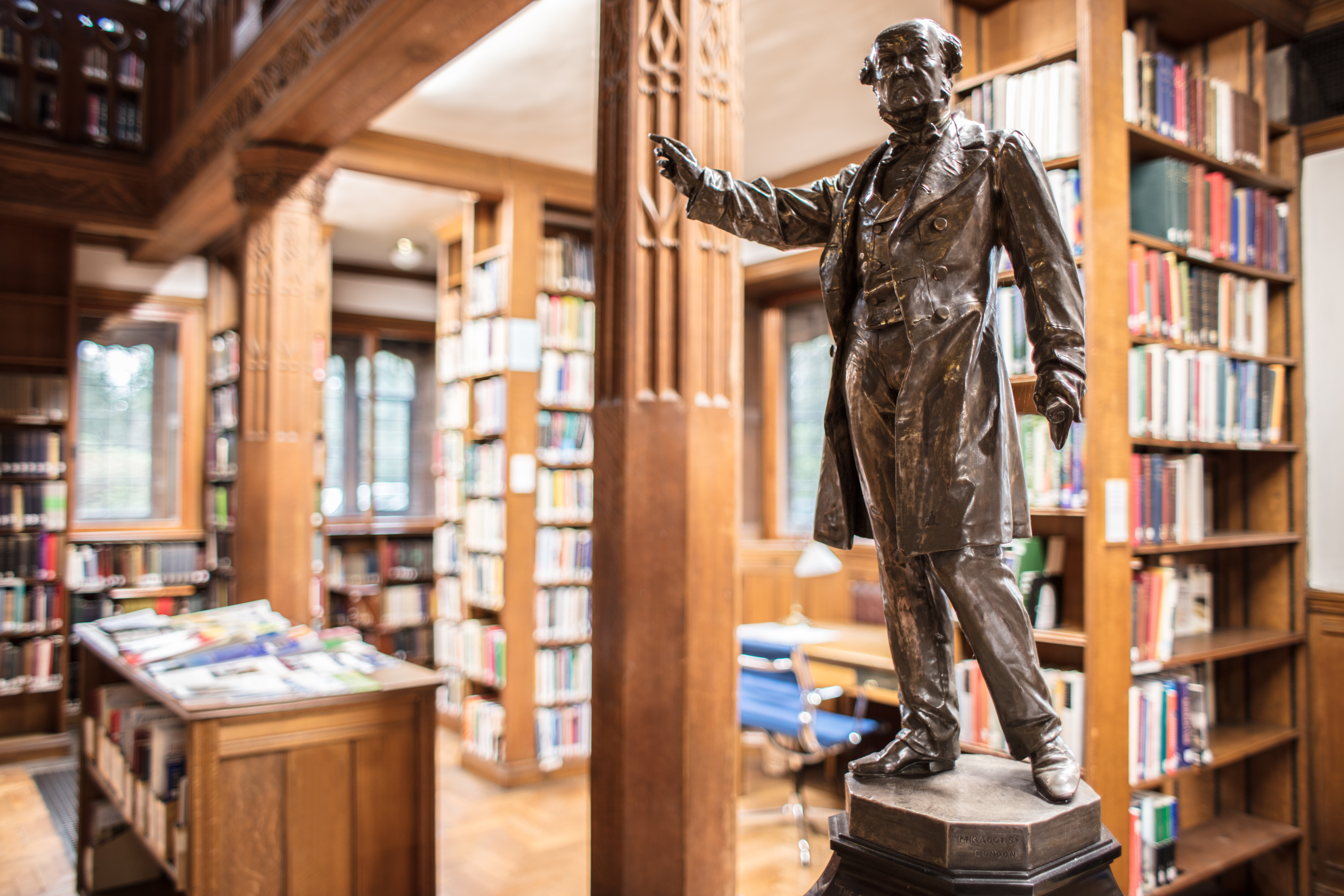
Gladstone's statue in the library.

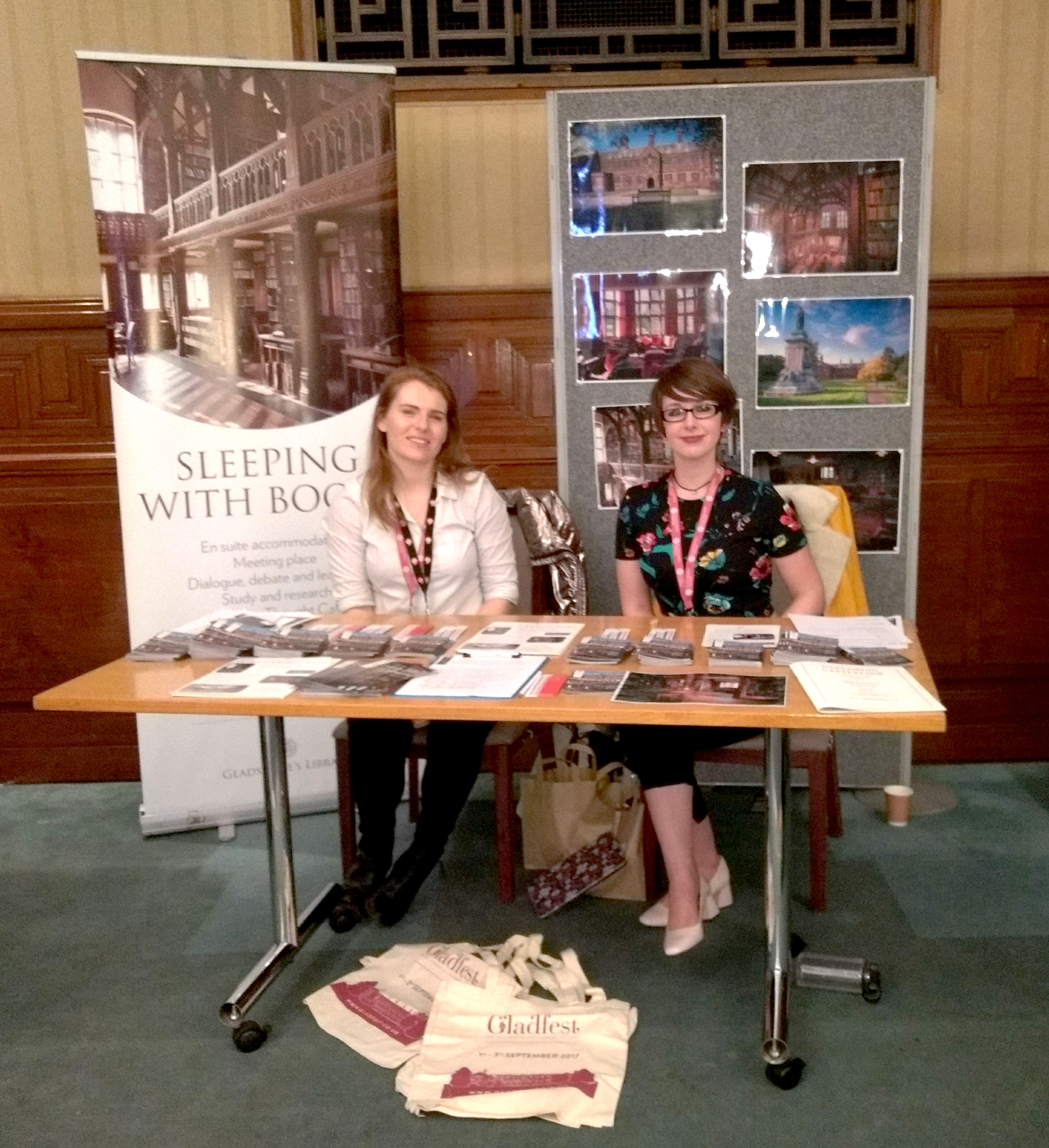
Gladstone's Library staff at the School of Advanced Study History Day 2017.

Gladstone's Library, known until 2010 as St Deiniol's Library (Welsh: Llyfrgell Deiniol Sant), is a residential library in Hawarden, Flintshire, Wales, UK.

Gladstone's Library is Britain's only Prime Ministerial Library and serves as the national memorial to William Ewart Gladstone. It is home to a large collection of printed items and archives that reflects Gladstone's main interests in history, literature, theology, and politics.

== History ==
The library was founded by William Gladstone in 1894. He was eager to share his personal library with others, especially those who faced financial constraint. He would allow bright children and young adults of the village of Hawarden to use his collection. His daughter Mary Gladstone said that his desire was to "bring together books who had no readers with readers who had no books".

In 1895, at the age of 85, William Gladstone gave £40,000 to the library as well as much of his own book collection. With the help of his daughter and his valet, he wheeled a selection of his books three quarters of a mile (1.2km) between his home at Hawarden Castle and the library. He unpacked them and put them onto shelves using his own classification system.

In a diary entry dated 23 December 1895, he described the library's founding: "I have this day constituted my trust at St Deiniol's. The cost of the work has been I think £41 to £42000, including some charges of maintenance to Dec. 31. 95. May God of His mercy prosper it."

Following his death in 1898, a public appeal was launched for funds to provide a permanent building to house the collection and replace the temporary structure. The £9,000 raised provided an imposing building, designed by John Douglas, which was officially opened by Earl Spencer on 14 October 1902 as the National Memorial to W.E. Gladstone. The Gladstone family fulfilled the founder's vision by funding the residential wing, which welcomed its first resident on 29 June 1906.

== Facilities ==
The library is a Grade I listed building and a registered charity.

The building includes historical reading rooms, 26 bedrooms for overnight guests, a guest lounge, cafe and restaurant.

The library runs regular tours, talks, workshops, masterclasses and residential courses.

== Collections ==
The library holds 20,000 volumes belonging to William Ewart Gladstone in its Foundation Collection, many of which contain Gladstone's own annotations, as well as over 150,000 books, pamphlets, and journals in its circulating collection.

It also holds the Glynne-Gladstone Archive, containing the personal, family, business, and estate correspondence and papers of the Glynne and Gladstone families.

== See also ==
- Dr Williams's Library in London
- List of non-ecclesiastical and non-residential works by John Douglas
