= Mary Macleod =

British Conservative politician

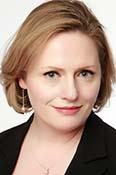

Member of Parliament for Brentford and Isleworth
- In office 6 May 2010 – 30 March 2015
- Preceded by: Ann Keen
- Succeeded by: Ruth Cadbury

Personal details
- Born: 4 January 1969 (age 57) London, England
- Party: Conservative
- Education: University of Glasgow
- Occupation: Chief Executive of Business in the Community
- Profession: Politician
- Website: MaryMacleod.org.uk

Mary Macleod (born 4 January 1969) is a British Conservative Party politician, who was the Member of Parliament (MP) for Brentford and Isleworth from the 2010 general election until the 2015 general election, when she was defeated by Ruth Cadbury of the Labour Party. After a career in business consulting, Macleod was a policy advisor to Queen Elizabeth II.

== Early life ==
Born in London to Scottish parents, she has lived for many years in Chiswick and continues to reside there. She graduated from the University of Glasgow with a degree in Ancient Greek, together with Business Studies.

== Career ==
On graduation, she joined Andersen Consulting and then Accenture, as a business consultant. She was Chief of Staff and Chief Operating Officer for Group Operations at ABN AMRO, and then Group Communications Head of Transition at Royal Bank of Scotland.

Before her election, she was an ambassador for ActionAid, a fellow of the Royal Society of Arts, and served as a policy advisor to The Queen and the Royal Household at Buckingham Palace, advising on public relations, communications and "strategic change within the monarchy." On 1 January 2023, Macleod became the Chief Executive of Business in the Community.

== Political career ==
Having unsuccessfully contested Ross, Skye and Inverness West at the 1997 general election, Macleod was elected as the Member of Parliament for the marginal seat of Brentford and Isleworth on 7 May 2010.

From May 2010, she served on the Home Affairs Select Committee. In September that year, she was appointed as parliamentary private secretary to the Rt Hon. Nick Herbert MP, Minister of State for Policing and Criminal Justice. She set up the All Party Parliamentary Group for Women in Parliament, and joined the Armed Forces Parliamentary Scheme as a Squadron Leader in the Royal Air Force. In September 2013, Macleod was appointed parliamentary private secretary to the new Culture Secretary, Maria Miller.

She was the primary supporter in the House of Commons for the Equality (Titles) Bill, dubbed the "Downton Abbey Law", which seeks to abolish male-only primogeniture in the Peerages. The Bill was ultimately unsuccessful.

In April 2014, Macleod accused the media of a "witch hunt" against her boss, Maria Miller, who was the subject of criticism for over-claiming expenses and failing to cooperate with the enquiry. However, the next day Miller resigned.

In July that year, she said there was a "bullying culture" in the House of Commons, and the behaviour of many male MPs was "off-putting to most women". Speaking in advance of the publishing of a report into female representation in Parliament, she suggested that reprimands from the Speaker for misbehaving MPs were "counter-effective", with some of them enjoying the attention.

Macleod was defeated in the 2015 general election by Ruth Cadbury of Labour by less than 500 votes. After the election, Macleod was appointed to a position advising the Secretary of State for Scotland, David Mundell.

In the snap 2017 general election, Macleod ran again as the Conservative candidate for Brentford and Isleworth, but lost by more than 12,000 votes, 20% of the vote.

Parliament of the United Kingdom
Preceded by Ann Keen	Member of Parliament for Brentford & Isleworth; 2010–2015	Succeeded by Ruth Cadbury
