= Etna Park =

Park near Buckley, Flintshire, Wales

Coordinates: 53.1775°N 3.0697°W

Etna Park is a park near the town of Buckley.

The area was a clay hole during the Industrial Revolution, and was later used as a landfill. The site has now been reclaimed, and has areas of wildflower meadow and woodland, and provides views across Cheshire, the Wirral and Merseyside.
