= Hawarden Castle (medieval) =

Medieval castle in Flintshire, Wales

Coordinates: 53.180849°N 3.019770°W

- Castell Penarlâg (Welsh)
- Hawarden, Flintshire, Wales
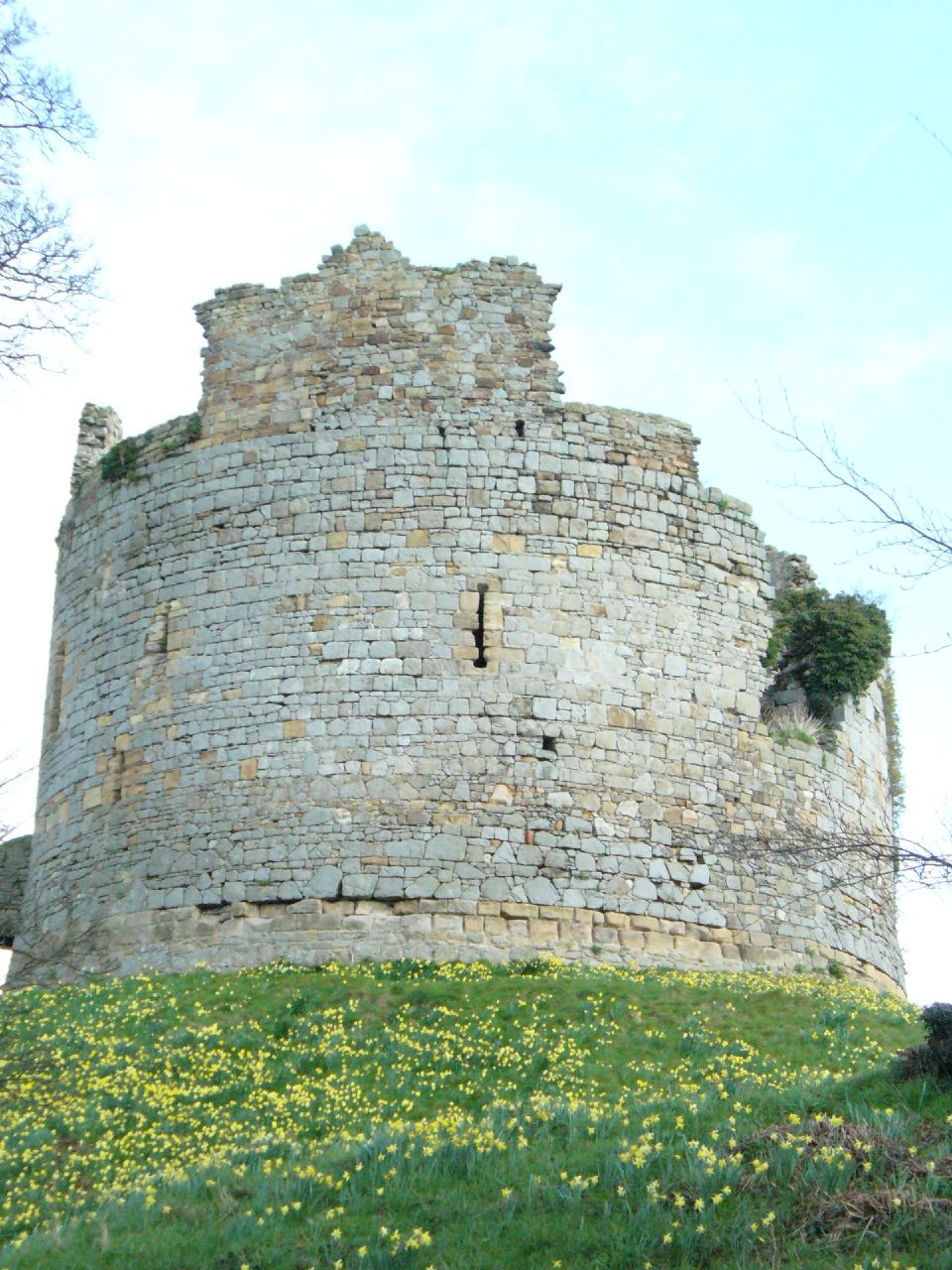
- A view of the keep

Site information
- Type: Medieval castle
- Condition: Ruin

Site history
- Built: late 13th century
- Built by: Attributed to Marcher Lords
- Events: Welsh Wars

Garrison information
- Past commanders: Roger de Clifford

Listed Building – Grade I
- Official name: Hawarden Castle (Old)
- Designated: 2 July 1967
- Reference no.: 14

Scheduled monument
- Official name: Hawarden Castle
- Reference no.: FL002

Hawarden Old Castle (Welsh: Castell Penarlâg) is a Grade I listed medieval castle near Hawarden, Flintshire, Wales.

The castle's origins are indeterminate and the oldest fortifications on this site may date back to the Iron Age, later being used as a Norman Motte-and-bailey castle which was reportedly destroyed and replaced in a short period during the 13th century.

The castle played an important role during the Welsh struggle for independence in the 13th century. At Easter 1282, Dafydd ap Gruffudd attacked and captured Hawarden Castle, thereby starting the final Welsh conflict with Norman England, in the course of which Welsh independence was lost. King Edward I's sense of outrage was such that he designed a punishment for Dafydd harsher than any previous form of capital punishment; Dafydd was hanged, drawn, and quartered in Shrewsbury in October 1283.

A sense at the wider outrage caused by Dafydd's attack being made at Easter can be read in the account of the Chronicle of Lanercost;

"...the Welsh nation, unable to pass their lives in peace, broke over their borders on Palm Sunday, carrying fire and sword among the people engaged in procession, and even laid siege [to some places – probably referring to Flint and Rhuddlan]; whose Prince Llywelyn, deceived (more's the pity) by the advice of his brother David, fiercely attacked his lord the King; as we read written about Christ, 'him whom I loved most hath set himself against me.'"

In 1294 the castle was captured during the revolt of Madog ap Llywelyn.

After the English Civil War in the 17th century the castle was slighted on the orders of Oliver Cromwell. Its ruins are on the New Hawarden Castle estate and are open to the public on some Sundays, typically the second and fourth Sundays in summertime. The castle was Grade I listed on 2 July 1967. It is also a scheduled monument.

== Gallery ==
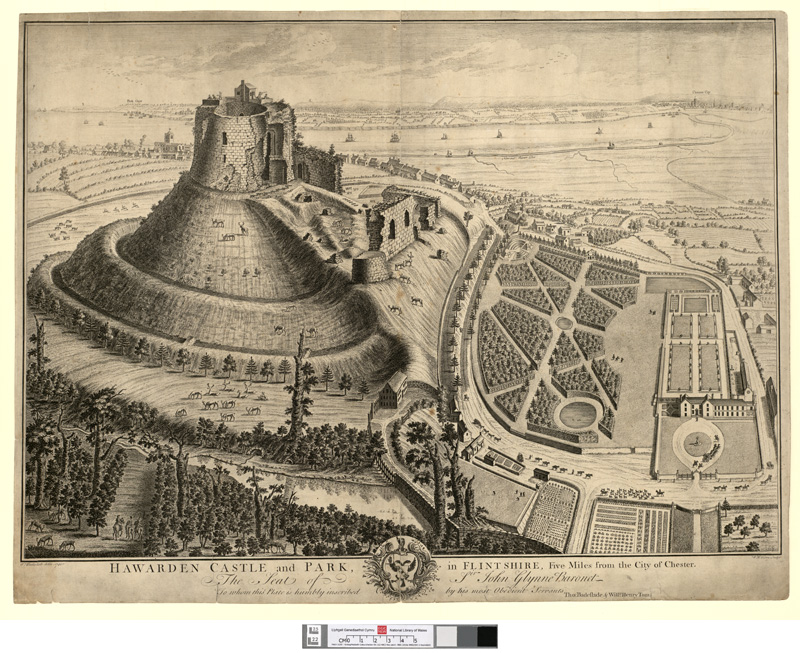

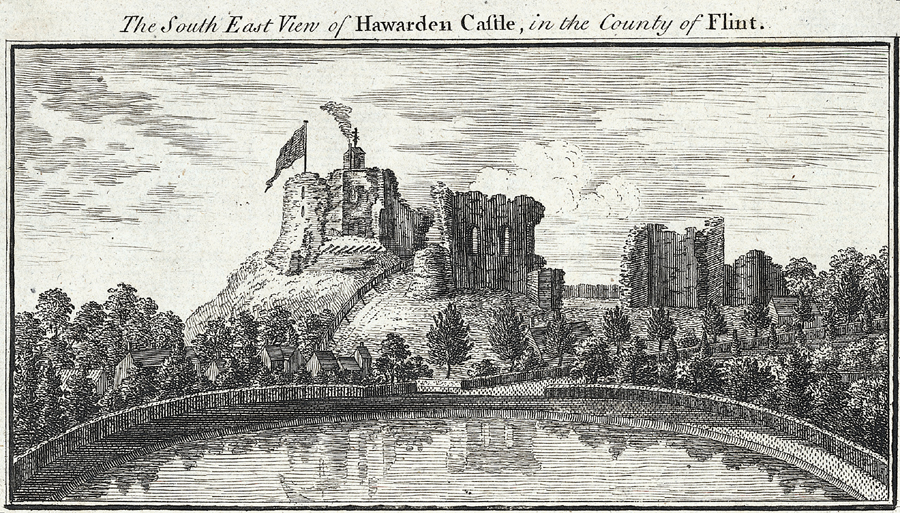

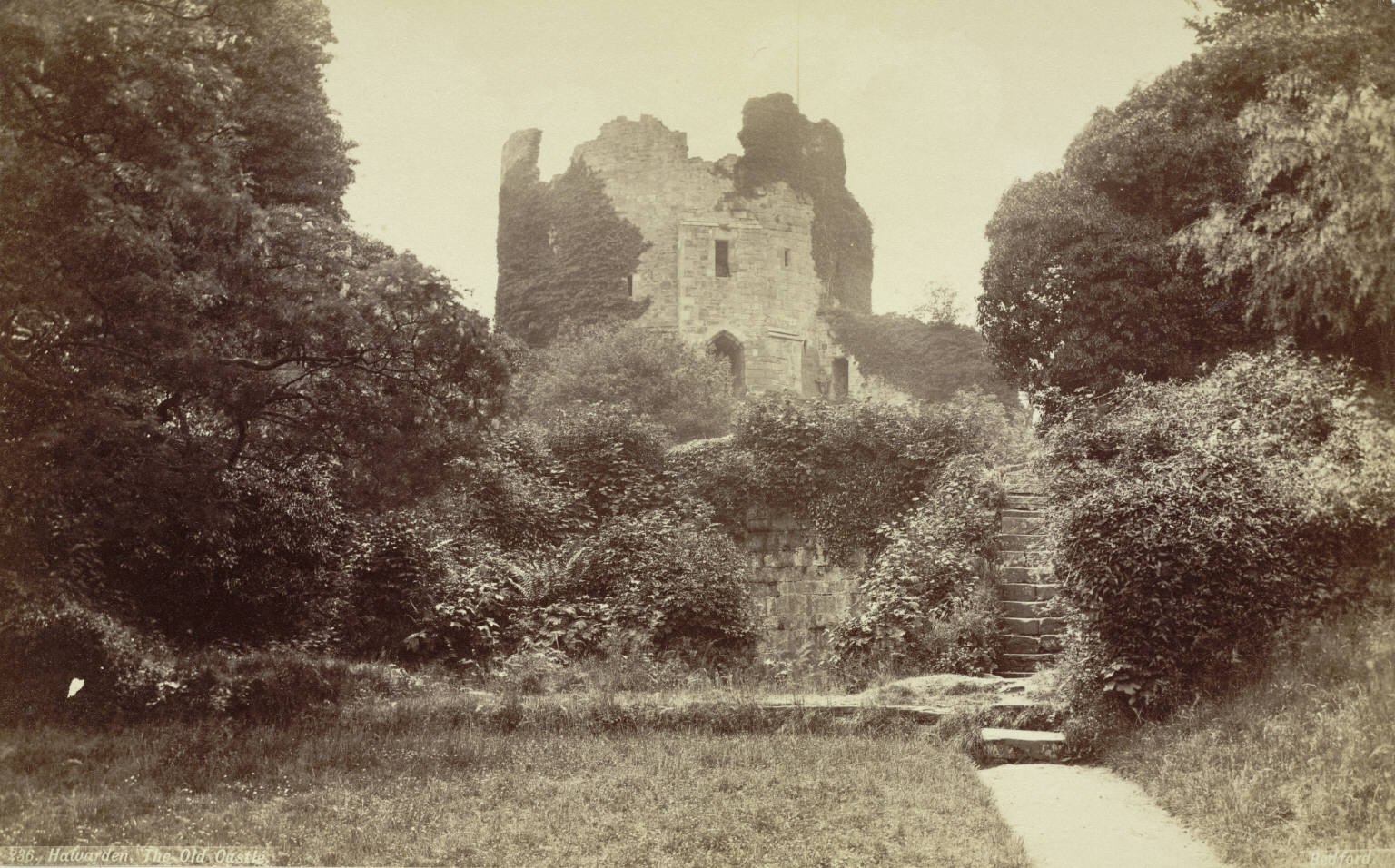
