= Elfed High School =

- Ysgol Uwchradd Elfed

Location
- Mill Lane; Buckley, Flintshire, CH7 3HQ; Wales; 53.17185°N 3.08313°W

Information
- Type: Community secondary school
- Motto: Welsh: Cymuned Ddysgu Ragorol (Outstanding Learning Community)
- Established: 1954
- Local authority: Flintshire County Council
- Department for Education URN: 401701 Tables
- Acting headteacher: Sarah Roberts
- Teaching staff: 45.5 (on an FTE basis)
- Gender: Mixed
- Age range: 11–16
- Enrolment: 928 (2024)
- Student to teacher ratio: 15.9
- Language: English
- Colours: Navy Blue & Gold
- Website: www.elfedhs.co.uk

Elfed High School (Welsh: Ysgol Uwchradd Elfed) is an 11–16 mixed, English-medium community secondary school in Buckley, Flintshire, Wales.

== History ==
Opened in 1954, the school was named after the poet Elfed (Howell Elvet Lewis, 1860-1953), a renowned bard and scholar who served as Archdruid of the National Eisteddfod of Wales from 1924 to 1928. Although from Carmarthenshire in southwest Wales, he had been a minister in Buckley during the 1880s.

In 1967 it became a Senior Comprehensive, serving a wide catchment area, including Buckley, Hawarden, Mynydd Isa, Saltney, Caergwrle, and Hope. The school became fully comprehensive in 1973, serving the communities of Buckley, Mynydd Isa, Drury, and surrounding areas. The main partner primary schools are Southdown, Westwood, Mountain Lane and Drury schools, but the school also attracts pupils from a number of others. Students from outside the normal catchment area who choose to attend the Elfed HS use public transport. The vast majority of students use bicycles or walk to school.

From September 2015 the Elfed HS education provision was re-categorized by the Flintshire Local Authority from 11-18 to 11-16.

Elfed High School was rated excellent by Estyn in 2015. As of 2021 Estyn has scrapped rating schools with grades.

Elfed High School changed their uniform from a maroon jumper, into a blue jumper and blazer. This was done in the 2021-22 academic year.

== Notable alumni ==
- Captain John Scragg, Puget Sound Pilot, WABPC (Washington State) Unlimited Master Motor and Sail (United States Coast Guard)
- Jo Stevens, Labour MP for Cardiff East and Secretary of State for Wales
- Ann Keen (née Fox), Labour MP for Brentford and Isleworth
- Sylvia Heal (née Fox), Labour MP for Halesowen and Rowley Regis
- Kim Ashfield, winner of Miss United Kingdom and Miss Wales in 1980
- Ryan Shawcross, footballer, Stoke City FC.
- Danny Collins, footballer, Wales and Nottingham Forest FC.
- John Lyons (footballer), Wrexham FC, Millwall FC, Cambridge United FC and Colchester United FC.
- Cherry Frampton, former glamour model.
