= Howell Elvet Lewis =

Welsh poet and preacher (1860–1953)

The Reverend Howell Elvet Lewis CH
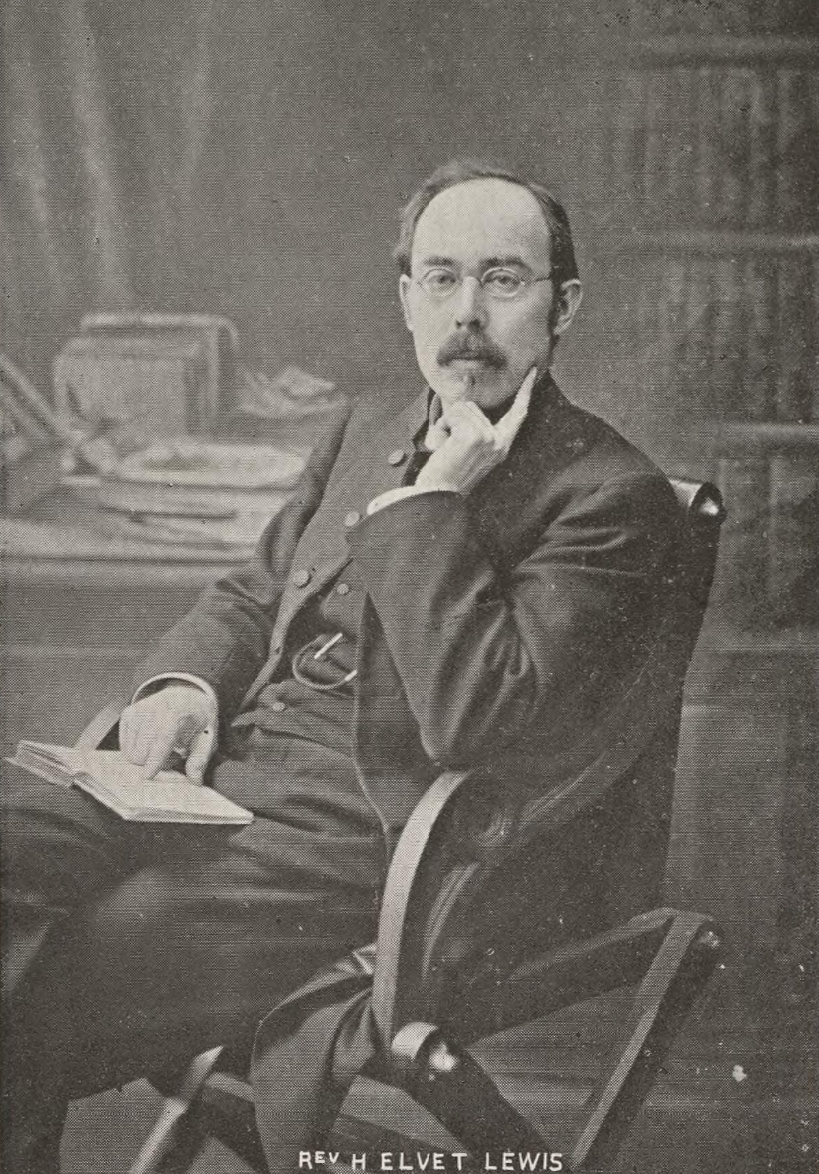
- Elfed in 1904
- Born: 14 April 1860; Y Gangell, Blaen-y-coed, Wales
- Died: 10 December 1953 (aged 93); Penarth, Wales
- Resting place: Blaen-y-coed chapel
- Other name: Elfed
- Occupations: Minister; poet; hymn-writer
- Spouses: Mary Taylor (m. 1887; died 1918); Elizabeth Lloyd (m. 1923; died 1927); Mary Davies (m. 1930)

Howell Elvet Lewis CH (14 April 1860 – 10 December 1953), widely known by his bardic name Elfed, was a Welsh Congregational minister, hymn-writer, and devotional poet, who served as Archdruid of the National Eisteddfod of Wales from 1924 to 1928.

Elfed High School in Buckley, Flintshire, was named after him.

== Early life ==
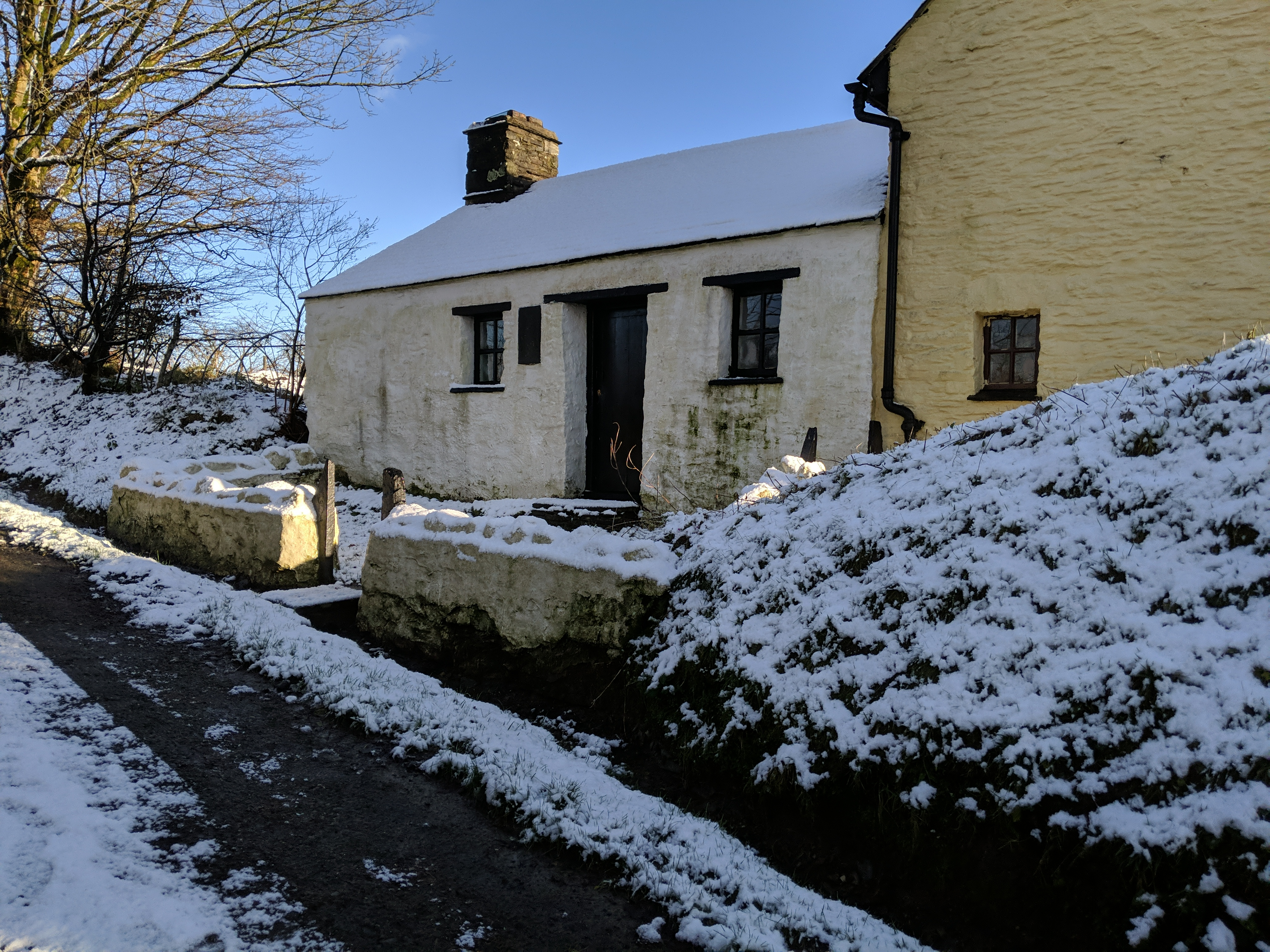
Y Gangell, where Elfed was born

Elfed was born on 14 April 1860, the eldest son of twelve children of James and Anna Lewis, of Y Gangell, near Blaenycoed, Carmarthenshire. His father was a farm labourer and his mother was a local shopkeeper. He had a very limited early education, but through self-study and attendance at the local chapel schoolroom he managed to gain entry to Newcastle Emlyn Grammar School at the age of 14. Two years later he succeeded in an examination for admission to the Presbyterian College, Carmarthen, where he trained for the ministry.

== Ministry ==
Elfed was ordained in 1880 and was made pastor of St John's English Congregational Church in Buckley, Flintshire, where the local Secondary School Elfed High School is named after him. In 1884 he moved to minister at Fish Street Church, Hull. He returned to Wales in 1891 as minister of the English Congregational Park Chapel, Llanelli. In 1898 he accepted a calling to Harecourt Chapel in London, where he remained until 1904. In 1904 he became minister of Tabernacle Chapel (Capel y Tabernacl in Welsh) – a Welsh-language Congregational chapel in King's Cross, London. This was the first time he undertook a ministry at a Welsh-language chapel. He remained at Y Tabernacl until his retirement in 1940. He retired to Penarth, where he became a member of Ebeneser Chapel, Cardiff.

Apart from serving as a church minister, Elfed's ministry included two periods as chair of the London Missionary Board in 1910 and 1922. He was one of three representatives of the Congregational Union of England and Wales invited to visit Madagascar to celebrate the centenary of the arrival of the first missionaries to the country. He was elected president of the National Free Church Council, 1926–27, president of the Welsh Union of the League of Nations, 1927–28, and chairman of the Congregational Union in 1933.

== Literary legacy ==
Elfed's literary output was prolific: he wrote essays, historical treaties, obituaries, devotional works and poetry. He won the National Eisteddfod Crown consecutively in 1888 (Wrexham) and 1889 (Brecon), and the Chair in 1894 (Caernarfon). He was inaugurated into the bardic order of the Gorsedd in 1888 and enthroned as its Archdruid in 1924, a position which he held until 1928.

Elfed's greatest contribution to Welsh literature was in the field of hymnody and hymnology. He published his first hymn, O Dywysog Pob Daioni, in 1881 during the first year of his ministry; he went on to write a large number of original hymns in Welsh and in English and to translate hymns between the two languages, many of which are still popular with congregations today.

Among his best-known original Welsh-language hymns is the patriotic hymn Cofia'n gwlad Benllywydd tirion (described as "a kind of second national anthem"); while his original English hymn Lord of Light, Your Name Outshining is widely used in hymn books on both sides of the Atlantic. A number of Welsh hymns translated into English appeared in a series of articles published in the magazine Sunday at Home, and were republished in book form in 1889 by the Religious Tract Society as Sweet Singers of Wales.

In 1924 he translated from German into Welsh the play Wilhelm Tell by Friedrich Schiller under the title Gwilym Tel.

== Awards ==
The University of Wales awarded Elfed three honorary degrees: Master of Arts (1906), Doctor of Divinity (1937), and Doctor of Laws (1949). He was the first person to achieve such an honour from the university. He was created a Member of the Order of the Companions of Honour in 1948.

== Personal life ==
Elfed married three times.

His first wife was Mary Taylor from Buckley. He married her in Stratford in 1887, and had seven children by her, of whom two died young. She died in 1918.

His second wife was Elizabeth Lloyd whom he married in 1923, but her health was fragile and she died in 1927 after barely four years of marriage.

His third wife was Mary Davies, one of the chapel members at Tabernacl Kings Cross, whom he married in 1930.

== Death ==
Elfed died on 10 December 1953. He was cremated and his ashes were scattered in Blaenycoed.

== Principal publications ==
=== Welsh ===
- Caniadau (2 vols, 1895–1901)
- Gwilym Tel (1924, translation of William Tell)

=== English ===
- My Christ and other Poems (1891)
- Israel and other Poems (1930)
- Songs of Assisi (1938)

== Sources ==
- Davies, M. B. (July 1954). "H. Elvet-Lewis (Elfed): a bibliography". Journal of the Welsh Bibliographical Society. 8 (1): 7–23, 106.
- Edwards, Huw (2014). City Mission. The story of London's Welsh chapels. Talybont: Y Lolfa. ISBN 978-1-84771-905-8.
- Jarvis, Branwen (2004). "Lewis, Howell Elvet [pseud. Elfed] (1860–1953)". Oxford Dictionary of National Biography (online ed.). Oxford University Press. doi:10.1093/ref:odnb/61280. (Subscription, Wikipedia Library access or UK public library membership required.)
- Jenkins, Emlyn G. (1957). Cofiant Elfed, 1860–1953. Aberystwyth: Gwasg Aberystwyth.
- Parry, Emyr Wyn (1958). Howell Elfed Lewis. London: Independent Press.

| Preceded by John Cadvan Davies | Archdruid of the National Eisteddfod of Wales; 1924–1928 | Succeeded by John Owen Williams (Pedrog) |
