= Hawarden =

Village and community in Flintshire, Wales

Hawarden: Welsh: Penarlâg
- Village and community
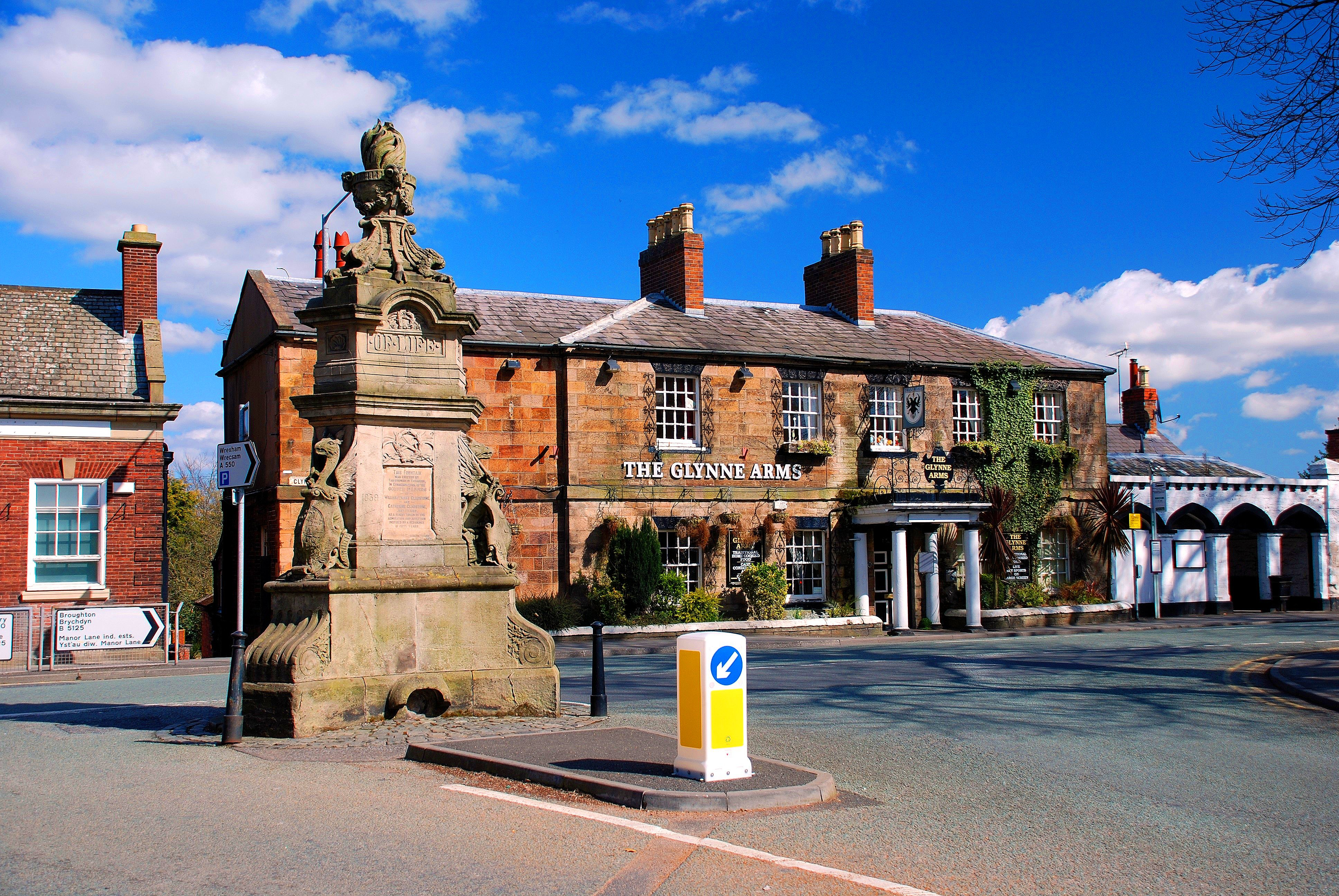
- Gladstone memorial fountain and Glynne Arms

- Location within Flintshire
- Population: 1,887 (Ward) (2011 census)
- OS grid reference: SJ315655
- Community: Hawarden
- Principal area: Flintshire
- Preserved county: Clwyd
- Country: Wales
- Sovereign state: United Kingdom
- Post town: DEESIDE
- Postcode district: CH5
- Dialling code: 01244
- Police: North Wales
- Fire: North Wales
- Ambulance: Welsh
- UK Parliament: Alyn and Deeside
- Senedd Cymru – Welsh Parliament: Alyn and Deeside
- Website: Council website
- List of places UK Wales Flintshire 53.182°N 3.02°W Map of the community

Hawarden (/ˈhɑːrdən/; Welsh: Penarlâg) is a village and community in Flintshire, Wales. It is part of the Deeside conurbation on the Wales-England border and is home to Hawarden Castle. In the 2011 census the ward of the same name had a population of 1,887, whereas the community of the same name, which also includes Ewloe (which also has a castle) Mancot and Aston had a population of 13,920. The scenic wooded Hawarden Park abuts the clustered settlement in the south. Hawarden Bridge consists of distribution and industrial business premises beyond Shotton/Queensferry and the Dee. The west of the main street is called The Highway, its start marked by the crossroads with a fountain in the middle, near which are public houses, some with restaurants. (Note: The Fox and Grapes, The Blue Bell and the Glynne Arms)

The village is 7 miles (11 km) from Chester. In 2014 it was named in The Sunday Times' annual Best Places To Live list.

== Etymology ==
Both the English and Welsh names of the village allude to its elevated geographical position. English Hawarden /ˈhɑːrdən/ is from Old English hēah "high" + worðign 'enclosure' and has had its bisyllabic pronunciation since the sixteenth century, its trisyllabic, now solely written, form being due to the influence of Welsh, which stresses and therefore kept the penultimate syllable. The Welsh name Penarlâg [ˌpɛnarˈlaːɡ] is older than Hawarden and is a compound of pennardd "high ground" + alaog, which is most likely a form of alafog 'rich in cattle' although may be a personal name.

== History ==
The 1848 Topographical Dictionary of Wales led by Samuel Lewis states that Hawarden is of remote antiquity and was called 'Pennard Halawg', or more properly 'Pen-y-Llwch', the headland above the lake. (Note: The name referring perhaps to the estuary as the terrain slopes unusually become much steeper along the straightened lower Dee's long channel with steeper sides here being within 3 miles (4.8 km) of the estuary - most of the village and Ewloe is over 80 metres - compared withup to 20 metres on both sides nearer Chester and Broughton above ordnance datum (sea level).) The hill forts such as the huge remains next to the medieval Hawarden Castle and Trueman's Hill motte were - it records locally - believed to date to the time of fortifications against incursions of the Cornavii tribe and the Romans.

The Normans recorded that the Saxons called the place Haordine, where, east of today's village, was the principal manor of the Saxon Hundred of Atiscros. William the Conqueror granted the lands and manor to Hugh Lupus since it formed part of the County Palatine of Chester, whereupon Hawarden Castle was built and later proved key to Welsh history, at that time lived in by Roger Fitzvalerine, then the Montaults, or de Montaltos, barons of Mold, who held it as seneschal.

1157, Henry II., having assembled a formidable army at Chester, advanced into Flintshire with a view to conquering Wales and camped on Saltney marsh, in the parish. To repel this attack, Owain Gwynedd, Prince of North Wales, marched his forces to Basingwerk near Holywell, where he took up his station within a few miles of the royal army. The boldness of Owain's movements inducing Henry to hope that the natives intended to risk a general engagement, in which he expected that the superior number and discipline of the English would ensure success, the king despatched a chosen body of troops, under the command of his principal barons, to bring the Welsh to action or to dislodge them from their position. This party, having to pass through the narrow defile of Coed-Eulo, in the parish of Hawarden, were suddenly attacked in that dangerous pass by Davydd and Cynan, sons of Owain, who, with a strong body of men, had set an ambush. Owing to the suddenness and impetuosity of the assault and the difficulties of the ground on which they had to contend, the English were routed with great slaughter and the few who escaped the carnage withdrew in the utmost disorder to the main body of the army. Exasperated by this unexpected discomfiture, Henry immediately collected the whole of his forces and marched along the coast into the heart of the enemy's country; and Owain, breaking up his camp, retired with his forces to St. Asaph.

Efforts to subdue north Welsh territory into a degree of fiefdom followed intermittently, with no great success. In the castle Llewellyn of Wales who was in possession negotiated peace in 1264 with Simon de Montford, who led a brief rebellion against Henry III of England and agreed to betroth his daughter to Llewellyn in exchange for restoring the de facto Welsh castle to Robert de Montault. The rebellion failed. Accordingly, by 1280 the castle became a crown asset, listed as a Castrum Regis. Later, following Edward's successful campaign imposing exacting terms on the Welsh, building Flint Castle and strengthening other castles, in 1282 Llewellyn's brother Dafydd took the castle back, killing the garrison and transferring Roger de Clifford to remote Snowdon. This second recapture of the castle triggered Edward's killing of Llewellyn and annexation of Wales. The castle became a prized possession: see Hawarden Castle.

The village of Saltney (next to Chester, but in Wales) was part of the parish.

=== 19th century ===
The prime minister William Ewart Gladstone (1809–1898) spent his later life in Hawarden Castle, which had in the Glorious Revolution been acquired by his wife's family, the Glynne baronets. In 1847 water was brought into the place at an expense of upwards of £1000 to be recouped by the River Dee Company. In the nineteenth century the economy of the parish (about three times larger than the modern Community Council area) involved weekly markets, many seams of coal, the making of tiles, bricks and drainage pipes and chemicals such as Glauber salts and ivory black making. (Note: The 1848 Topographical dictionary states 16,444 acres, whereof 1292 are common or waste...It abounds with coal in various parts, the strata of which lie under freestone, and shale of a saponaceous [(soapy)] quality, with occasional beds of ironstone and gravel. The upper seam of coal, called the Hollin coal, is from six to seven feet in depth; the second, called the Brassy coal, about three feet in thickness; the third, called the rough coal, also about three feet thick; and the fourth and lowest seam, called the main coal, ten feet in thickness. This last, which is of very superior quality, is in great request for the Dublin and other markets. Collieries are worked on an extensive scale, in various parts of the parish; and there are large works for making fire-bricks, tiles, and draining-pipes; also potteries for the manufacture of the coarser kinds of earthenware. A laboratory for the making of Glauber salts, sal ammoniac, and ivory-black, was established in the township of Saltney, in the year 1781, and is conducted on an extensive scale, but for the manufacture of ivory-black only. The river Dee, or Chester channel, passes on the north-east of the town; and there are two tramroads for the conveyance of produce from the various collieries and potteries to the river. The Chester and Holyhead railway runs for about seven miles through the parish, parallel with the river Dee; and in 1847 an act was passed for the construction of a line from the Holyhead railway in the parish of Hawarden to the town of Mold, with branches to the Upper King's Ferry on the Dee, and the Frith lime-works near Hope. Several schooners and flats are employed in the transport of coal, bricks, and other articles produced here; and two smacks are engaged in a fishery off the Isle of Man, which is conducted by inhabitants of the parish. The market is on Saturday; and fairs, principally for cattle, are annually held on April 28th and October 22nd.)

In 1886 the curate of Hawarden, the Rev. Harry Drew, married Mary Gladstone, the second daughter of the Prime Minister, at St Margaret's Church, Westminster – a society wedding attended by the Prince of Wales.

In 1896, Hawarden was the location of prime minister William Ewart Gladstone's meeting with Li Hongzhang, a key reformer in the Qing dynasty's Self Strengthening Movement, on his diplomatic mission to the UK.

Gladstone bequeathed his library to the town under the name of St Deiniol's Library in honour of the patron saint of the parish church next door. It is the only residential library in Britain and was renamed Gladstone's Library in 2010.

== Education ==
Hawarden Village Church School (previously Rector Drew Primary School) is the junior school of the village. Hawarden High School is a high school which dates back to 1606 and was attended by Michael Owen and Gary Speed, the former manager of the Wales national football team.

In 1927, Knutsford Ordination Test School relocated to Hawarden — first to the Old Rectory, then to the new castle in 1939 before it closed the following year.

== Economy ==
Queensferry consists predominantly of industrial, commercial and storage businesses by the River Dee and is situated to immediately northeast of the community - the village is residential. moneysupermarket.com has significant premises at St David's Park by the main A55 road in nearby Ewloe.

Hawarden Airport, sometimes called Hawarden (Chester) Airport, with adjoining Hawarden Industrial Park is in nearby Broughton.

=== Visitor attractions ===
- St Deiniol's Church
- Hawarden Castle
- Old Hawarden Castle
- Gladstone's Library

== Governance ==
At the lowest level of local government, Hawarden Community Council elects or co-opts twenty-one community councillors from three wards namely Hawarden Aston, Hawarden Ewloe and Hawarden Mancot.

There are three identical electoral wards for Flintshire County Council, each of which elects two councillors.

The county archives, the Flintshire Record Office, are housed in the Old Rectory at Hawarden.

== Climate ==
The highest temperature in Wales was recorded in Hawarden on 18 July 2022 at 37.1 °C (98.8 °F). The previous highest temperature recorded in Wales, 35.2 °C (95.4 °F), was also recorded in Hawarden on 2 August 1990. Hawarden has held this record almost continuously, until it was replaced for a few hours by Gogerddan which recorded a temperature of 35.3 °C (95.5 °F) on 18 July 2022, first breaking the Welsh record, after which Hawarden surpassed Gogerddan.

Climate data for Hawarden Airport WMO ID: 03321; coordinates 53°10′32″N 2°59′11″W; elevation 10 m (33 ft), 1991–2020 normals, extremes 1901–present. (Note: Data has been collected at Hawarden Bridge for the period 1901–2005 and at Hawarden Airport since 1941.)
| Month | Jan | Feb | Mar | Apr | May | Jun | Jul | Aug | Sep | Oct | Nov | Dec | Year |
|---|---|---|---|---|---|---|---|---|---|---|---|---|---|
| Record high °C (°F) | 16.1 (61.0) | 17.2 (63.0) | 22.2 (72.0) | 25.8 (78.4) | 32.2 (90.0) | 35.1 (95.2) | 37.1 (98.8) | 35.2 (95.4) | 32.3 (90.1) | 28.2 (82.8) | 19.6 (67.3) | 16.7 (62.1) | 37.1 (98.8) |
| Mean daily maximum °C (°F) | 8.1 (46.6) | 8.8 (47.8) | 10.9 (51.6) | 13.6 (56.5) | 16.7 (62.1) | 19.3 (66.7) | 21.1 (70.0) | 20.7 (69.3) | 18.4 (65.1) | 14.6 (58.3) | 10.9 (51.6) | 8.4 (47.1) | 14.3 (57.7) |
| Daily mean °C (°F) | 4.9 (40.8) | 5.4 (41.7) | 7.0 (44.6) | 9.1 (48.4) | 12.0 (53.6) | 14.8 (58.6) | 16.6 (61.9) | 16.3 (61.3) | 14.1 (57.4) | 10.9 (51.6) | 7.6 (45.7) | 5.2 (41.4) | 10.3 (50.5) |
| Mean daily minimum °C (°F) | 1.8 (35.2) | 2.0 (35.6) | 3.0 (37.4) | 4.5 (40.1) | 7.2 (45.0) | 10.3 (50.5) | 12.1 (53.8) | 12.0 (53.6) | 9.8 (49.6) | 7.2 (45.0) | 4.3 (39.7) | 2.1 (35.8) | 6.4 (43.5) |
| Record low °C (°F) | −18.2 (−0.8) | −17.8 (0.0) | −12.4 (9.7) | −3.9 (25.0) | −1.6 (29.1) | −0.3 (31.5) | 3.5 (38.3) | 2.2 (36.0) | −0.1 (31.8) | −7.2 (19.0) | −9.9 (14.2) | −17.2 (1.0) | −18.2 (−0.8) |
| Average precipitation mm (inches) | 59.9 (2.36) | 49.5 (1.95) | 48.2 (1.90) | 49.5 (1.95) | 52.9 (2.08) | 64.5 (2.54) | 60.0 (2.36) | 58.9 (2.32) | 62.2 (2.45) | 76.2 (3.00) | 71.3 (2.81) | 75.6 (2.98) | 728.8 (28.69) |
| Average precipitation days | 13.0 | 10.8 | 11.0 | 10.2 | 9.2 | 10.0 | 10.0 | 10.5 | 10.3 | 12.7 | 14.7 | 14.2 | 136.7 |
| Mean monthly sunshine hours | 63.9 | 81.6 | 122.5 | 177.6 | 209.1 | 190.9 | 199.0 | 171.2 | 142.1 | 90.6 | 67.9 | 56.1 | 1,572.5 |
Source 1: Met Office Monthly Weather Report
Source 2: Meteo Climat CEDA Archive

== Transport ==
Close towns include Connah's Quay 3 miles (4.8 km), Mold 6 miles (9.7 km), Flint 7 miles (11 km) and the city of Wrexham 11 miles (18 km).

Hawarden railway station is on the Borderlands line with services direct to Bidston to the north and to Wrexham Central (via Wrexham General) to the south.

There are three interchanges with local roads onto the major A55 road linking North Wales to Chester and the major A494 road linking Dolgellau via Mold to the Wirral where it divides into the roads towards Liverpool and Manchester (the M53 and M56 motorways) - the village has a choice of three routes towards Chester city centre.

Hawarden Airport lies some 2 miles (3.2 km) east of the village.

== Notable residents ==
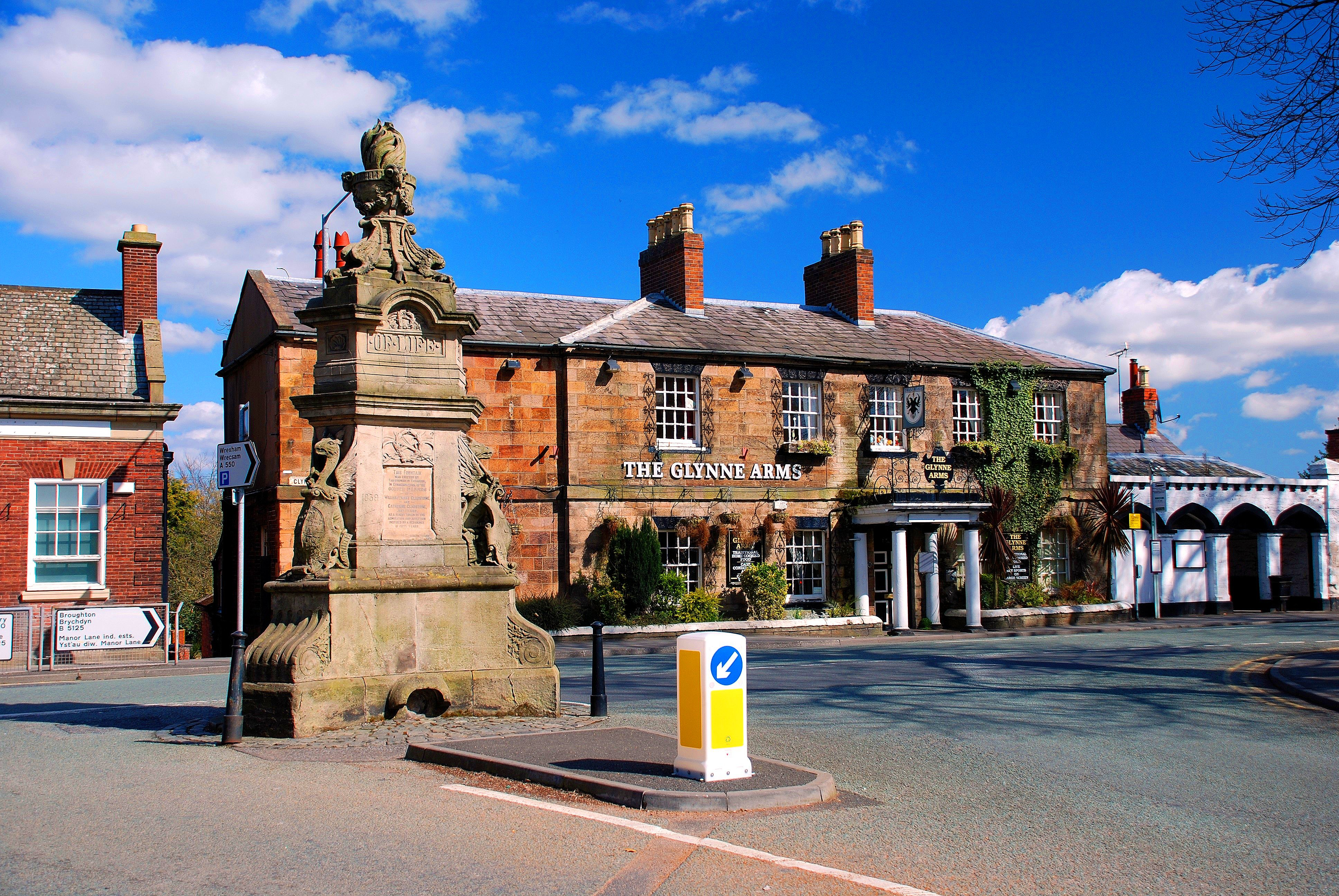
Monument to William Gladstone

- Sir John Glynne, 6th Baronet (1713–1777) politician and landowner, built Hawarden Castle.
- Emma, Lady Hamilton (1765–1815), maid, model, dancer and actress; raised in Hawarden.
- William Ewart Gladstone (1809–1898), 12 years as Prime Minister; retired to Hawarden Castle.
- Edmund J. Baillie (1851–1897) businessman, horticulturalist and vegetarianism activist.
- Mary Gladstone (1847–1927), daughter of the UK Prime Minister, William Ewart Gladstone; lived in Hawarden Castle from 1886
- Edith Austin (1867–1953) tennis player and Wimbledon singles finalist in 1894 and five time British Covered Court Champion was born in Hawarden.
- Maysie Chalmers (1894–1982), actress, electrical engineer and designer, leading figure in the Electrical Association for Women.
- Air Marshal Sir John Rowlands (1915–2006), recipient of the George Cross for bomb disposal in WWII; later worked on nuclear weapons programme.
- Nicholas Hunt (1930–2013), navy Rear-Admiral, father of Jeremy Hunt MP.
- Barry Jones, Baron Jones (born 1938), politician, went to Hawarden Grammar School
- Tony Millington (1943–2015) footballer, with over 350 club caps and 21 for Wales
- Sasha (DJ), (born 1969), DJ and producer, real name Alexander Paul Coe
- Michael Owen (born 1979), footballer with 326 club caps and 89 for England; went to school in Hawarden.
- Jamie Hewlett, (born 1968), Comic book artist mostly known for Tank girl and co-creating the animated band, Gorillaz with Damon Albarn. Hewlett was born in Hawarden but was raised in Horsham, West Sussex.

== See also ==
- Hawarden Castle
- St Deiniol's Church, Hawarden
- Hawarden Rangers F.C.
- Hawarden Airport
- Hawarden Manor House

== Notes and references ==
Notes
