= 1911 Kilmarnock Burghs by-election =

UK parliamentary by-election

The 1911 Kilmarnock Burghs by-election was a Parliamentary by-election held on 26 September 1911. It returned one Member of Parliament (MP) to the House of Commons of the United Kingdom, elected by the first past the post voting system. The constituency consisted of five parliamentary burghs: Kilmarnock in the county of Ayr, Dumbarton in the county of Dumbarton, Rutherglen in the county of Lanark and Renfrew and Port Glasgow in the county of Renfrew.

== Vacancy ==
Adam Rolland Rainy had been Liberal MP for Kilmarnock Burghs since gaining the seat from the Conservatives in 1906. He died on 26 August 1911 at the youthful age of 49, causing the by-election.

Dr Adam Rainy

== Electoral history ==
Dr Rainy's Liberal victory in 1906 coincided with the landslide win for his party across the UK. However, when the Liberals lost ground in January 1910, Rainy managed to increase his majority. That comfortable win was confirmed 11 months later;

General election December 1910: Kilmarnock Burghs
Party	Candidate	Votes	%	±%
Liberal	Adam Rolland Rainy	8,657	60.9	−0.2
Conservative	James Buyers Black	5,569	39.1	+0.2
Majority		3,088	21.8	−0.4
Turnout		14,226	86.4	−2.5
Liberal hold		Swing	-0.2	

== Candidates ==
- WGC Gladstone
  Twenty-six-year-old William Glynne Charles Gladstone was chosen as the new Liberal candidate. He was a grandson of the former Liberal Prime Minister, William Gladstone and the son of former Liberal MP, William Henry Gladstone. In 1909, Gladstone was the Assistant Private Secretary to John Hamilton-Gordon, Earl of Aberdeen who was serving as Lord Lieutenant of Ireland. In early 1911, he served for a few months at the British Embassy in Washington, D.C. as an Honorary Attaché. This was his first election as a candidate.
- The Conservatives chose a new candidate in 57-year-old Sir John David Rees. He was a former colonial administrator in India. He was a former Liberal MP for Montgomery Boroughs until December 1910 when he did not defend his seat. He crossed the floor before the dissolution of parliament November 1910.
  JD Rees
- A Labour party candidate, in the form of 29-year-old Thomas McKerrell appeared for the first time. At the last election, he had contested Liverpool Kirkdale. He sat on the executives of the Scottish and British Miners unions. He was also supported by Scottish suffragettes, like Muriel Scott. He had been a Kilmarnock magistrate. He was the organiser of the Ayrshire Miners Union. He was a member of Kilmarnock Town Council.

== Result ==
The Liberal Party held the seat.

1911 Kilmarnock Burghs by-election
Party	Candidate	Votes	%	±%
Liberal	Will Gladstone	6,923	48.3	−12.6
Conservative	John Rees	4,637	32.4	−6.7
Labour	Thomas McKerrell	2,761	19.3	New
Majority		2,286	15.9	−5.9
Turnout		14,321		
Liberal hold		Swing	-3.0	

== Aftermath ==
Rees was to get elected at the 1912 Nottingham East by-election. A General Election was due to take place by the end of 1915. By the autumn of 1914, the following candidates had been adopted to contest that election.

- Liberal: Will Gladstone
- Unionist:
- Labour:

Due to the outbreak of war, the election never took place. In 1915 while serving in France, Gladstone was Killed in action. This resulted in the 1915 Kilmarnock Burghs by-election in which the Liberal Alexander Shaw was returned unopposed. McKerrell did not stand for parliament again.
