= Baron Craigmyle =

Title in the Peerage of the United Kingdom

Baron Craigmyle, of Craigmyle in the County of Aberdeen, is a title in the Peerage of the United Kingdom. It was created in May 1929 for the Liberal politician and judge Thomas Shaw, Baron Shaw. He had already in 1909 been given a life peerage under the Appellate Jurisdiction Act 1876 as Baron Shaw, of Dunfermline in the County of Fife. He served as a Lord of Appeal in Ordinary in the House of Lords from 1909 to 1929, when he was rewarded with a hereditary peerage. On his death in 1937 the life peerage became extinct while he was succeeded in the hereditary barony by his son, the second Baron. He notably represented Kilmarnock in Parliament as a Liberal. As of 2009, the title is held by the latter's grandson, the fourth Baron, who succeeded his father in 1998.

== Barons Craigmyle (1929) ==
- Thomas Shaw, 1st Baron Craigmyle (1850–1937)
- Alexander Shaw, 2nd Baron Craigmyle (1883–1944)
- Thomas Shaw, 3rd Baron Craigmyle (1923–1998)
- Thomas Columba Shaw, 4th Baron Craigmyle (born 1960)

The heir apparent is the present holder's son Hon. Alexander Francis Shaw (born 1988).

=== Line of Succession ===
- Thomas Shaw, Baron Shaw, 1st Baron Craigmyle (1850—1937)
  - Alexander Shaw, 2nd Baron Craigmyle (1883—1944)
    - Thomas Donald Mackay Shaw, 3rd Baron Craigmyle (1923—1998)
      - Thomas Columba Shaw, 4th Baron Craigmyle (born 1960)
        - (1) Hon. Alexander Francis Shaw (born 1988)
        - (2) Hon. Finnian Donald Shaw (born 1990)
        - (3) Hon. Calum Edward Shaw (born 1993)
        - (4) Hon. Joseph Thomas Shaw (born 1996)
      - (5) Hon. Justin Edward Magnus Shaw (born 1965)
      - (6) Hon. Alexander Joseph Ranald Shaw (born 1971)

The 4th Baron Craigmyle has expressed some sympathy for the freeman on the land movement, which led to his receiving tens of thousands of oaths of loyalty based on article 61 of Magna Carta.

== Arms ==
Coat of arms of Baron Craigmyle

Crest
A demi-savage holding in his dexter hand a club resting on his shoulder Proper.
Escutcheon
Ermine a fir tree growing out of a mount in base Proper between two piles Azure issuing from a chief Gules charged with a scroll Argent with seal pendant Proper.
Supporters
Misericordia Fidelitas Jus (Mercy Fidelity Right)
