= Ciel =

Ciel (meaning heaven or sky in French) or CIEL may refer to:

== People ==
- Ciel (Canadian DJ), a Canadian DJ and electronic musician

== Companies and organizations ==
- Ciel (beverage) a bottled water brand owned by The Coca-Cola Company
- Ciel (company), developer of the visual novel After...
- CIEL-FM, radio station in Quebec, Canada.
- Ciel Satellite Group
- CIEL UK, Le Centre International d'Etudes Liturgiques-UK
- Center for International Environmental Law

== Fiction ==
- Ciel: The Last Autumn Story, a fantasy manhwa by Rhim Ju-yeon
- Ciel, a character in the visual novel, anime and manga Tsukihime, as well as the game Melty Blood
- Ciel, a character in the Mega Man Zero games
- Ciel Phantomhive, the main character in the manga and anime Black Butler
- Ciel Sousa, a character in Sophie Labelle's webcomic Assigned Male and the spinoff novel Ciel
- Ciel City, a place in Little Airplane Wissie, early development version of Super Wings
- Ciel, a character from Elsword

== Other uses ==
- Ciel (footballer), Brazilian professional footballer
- Ciel, Saône-et-Loire, a former commune of the department of Saône-et-Loire in France
- Cadillac Ciel, an American full-size convertible concept car
- Ciel, a tincture in heraldry also called bleu celeste or celeste (sky-blue)
