= Peter Sturrock =

Peter Sturrock may refer to:

- Peter A. Sturrock (1924–2024), British physicist
- Peter Sturrock (MP) (1820–1904), Scottish civil engineer, colliery owner and Conservative politician
