= Donald Shaw, 3rd Baron Craigmyle =

Thomas Donald Mackay Shaw, 3rd Baron Craigmyle KStJ (17 November 1923 – 30 April 1998) was a British aristocrat, a prominent convert to Roman Catholicism, and a philanthropist. He was a President of the Catholic Union of Great Britain.

== Early life ==
The young Shaw was the son of the 2nd Baron Craigmyle and was born on 17 November 1923.

He was educated at Eton and Trinity College, Oxford, obtaining a MA degree. In 1943, he was commissioned as a sub-lieutenant into the Royal Navy Volunteer Reserve, serving until 1946.

== Personal life ==
In 1955, Shaw married the artist Anthea Esther Christine Rich (1933–2016), a daughter of Canon Edward Rich. She had grown up in Chiswick and studied at the Chelsea School of Art, before travelling to India where she met her future husband. They were married in St James's, Spanish Place, Westminster, in 1955. He followed his wife in converting to Roman Catholicism in 1956.

They had four sons and three daughters. Their second son Thomas Columba Shaw is the current (4th) Baron Craigmyle. Their youngest son Joseph Shaw is an academic and the current chairman of the Latin Mass Society.

Craigmyle struggled with alcoholism, and following his recovery committed much of his time and wealth to charitable work helping addicts, the homeless and the destitute.

== Career ==
He was chairman of Craigmyle & Co Ltd, and Claridge Mills Ltd, and director of Inchcape & Co. Ltd. Clubs: Royal Thames Yacht Club, Caledonian Club, Bengal (Calcutta). Membership of other associations: Royal Society of Arts (FRSA), Venerable Order of Saint John (CStJ), and President of the British Association of the Sovereign Order of Malta.

Lord Craigmyle was "one of Britain's most philanthropic Roman Catholic laymen. A convert...with a deep piety and astonishing personal generosity, to the great benefit of the numerous causes he supported".

He died on 30 April 1998.

== Honours and awards ==
- Bailiff Grand Cross of Honour and Devotion of the Sovereign Military Order of Malta
- Fellow of the Royal Society of Arts (F.R.S.A.)
- Knight of the Most Venerable Order of the Hospital of St. John of Jerusalem (K.St.J.) (1989)
- Knight Commander with Star of the Order of Pius IX (1993)

Coat of arms of Donald Shaw, 3rd Baron Craigmyle

Crest
A demi-savage holding in his dexter hand a club resting on his shoulder Proper.
Escutcheon
Ermine a fir tree growing out of a mount in base Proper between two piles Azure issuing from a chief Gules charged with a scroll Argent with seal pendant Proper.
Supporters
Misericordia Fidelitas Jus (Mercy Fidelity Right)

Peerage of the United Kingdom
Preceded by Alexander Shaw	Baron Craigmyle; 1944–1998	Succeeded by Thomas Shaw
