= Kilmarnock Burghs =

Parliamentary constituency in the United Kingdom, 1832–1918

- Former district of burghs constituency for the House of Commons
- Subdivision: Ayrshire, Lanarkshire, Dunbartonshire, Renfrewshire
- Major settlements: Kilmarnock, Dumbarton, Rutherglen, Renfrew, Port Glasgow

1832–1918
- Seats: One
- Created from: Ayrshire constituency Renfrewshire; Glasgow Burghs
- Replaced by: Kilmarnock; Dumbarton Burghs; West Renfrewshire; East Renfrewshire; Rutherglen

Kilmarnock Burghs was a district of burghs constituency of the House of Commons of the Parliament of the United Kingdom from 1832 to 1918. It elected one Member of Parliament (MP) by the first-past-the-post voting system.

Kilmarnock county constituency was created when the district of burghs constituency was abolished.

== Boundaries ==
The constituency consisted of five parliamentary burghs: Kilmarnock in the county of Ayr, Dumbarton in the county of Dumbarton, Rutherglen in the county of Lanark and Renfrew and Port Glasgow in the county of Renfrew.

The Kilmarnock burgh was previously within the Ayrshire constituency and Port Glasgow was previously within the Renfrewshire constituency. Dumbarton, Rutherglen and Renfrew were transferred from Glasgow Burghs.

In 1918 the burgh of Kilmarnock was merged into the then new Kilmarnock county constituency, which included areas previously within North Ayrshire and South Ayrshire. The new Kilmarnock constituency consisted of "The county district of Kilmarnock, inclusive of all burghs situated therein except in so far as included in the Ayr District of Burghs." The burgh of Dumbarton was transferred to Dumbarton Burghs, the burgh of Port Glasgow was merged into West Renfrewshire, the burgh of Renfrew into East Renfrewshire and the burgh of Rutherglen into the Rutherglen constituency.

== Members of Parliament ==
Election	Member	Party
1832	John Dunlop	Whig
1835	John Bowring	Radical
1837	John Campbell Colquhoun	Conservative
1841	Alexander Johnston	Whig
May 1844 by-election	Edward Pleydell-Bouverie	Whig
1859	Edward Pleydell-Bouverie	Liberal
Feb 1874	James Fortescue Harrison	Liberal
1880	John Dick Peddie	Liberal
1885	Peter Sturrock	Conservative
1886	Stephen Williamson	Liberal
1895	John McAusland Denny	Conservative
1906	Adam Rolland Rainy	Liberal
1911 by-election	Will Gladstone	Liberal
1915 by-election	Alexander Shaw	Liberal
1918	constituency abolished: see Kilmarnock	

== Election results ==
=== Elections in the 1830s ===
General election 1832: Kilmarnock Burghs
Party	Candidate	Votes	%
Whig	John Dunlop	535	50.3
Whig	James Campbell	528	49.7
Majority		7	0.6
Turnout		1,063	92.0
Registered electors		1,155	
Whig win (new seat)			

General election 1835: Kilmarnock Burghs
Party	Candidate	Votes	%	±%
Radical	John Bowring	520	54.8	N/A
Whig	John Dunlop	276	29.1	−21.2
Conservative	Robert Downie	153	16.1	New
Majority		244	25.7	N/A
Turnout		949	75.3	−16.7
Registered electors		1,261		
Radical gain from Whig		Swing	N/A	

General election 1837: Kilmarnock Burghs
Party	Candidate	Votes	%	±%
Conservative	John Campbell Colquhoun	509	53.7	+37.6
Radical	John Bowring	438	46.3	−8.5
Majority		71	7.4	N/A
Turnout		947	65.3	−10.0
Registered electors		1,451		
Conservative gain from Radical		Swing	+23.1	

=== Elections in the 1840s ===
General election 1841: Kilmarnock Burghs
Party	Candidate	Votes	%	±%
Whig	Alexander Johnston	490	50.6	N/A
Conservative	John Campbell Colquhoun	479	49.4	−4.3
Majority		11	1.2	N/A
Turnout		969	76.8	+11.5
Registered electors		1,262		
Whig gain from Conservative		Swing	N/A	

Johnston's death caused a by-election.

By-election, 29 May 1844: Kilmarnock Burghs
Party	Candidate	Votes	%	±%
Whig	Edward Pleydell-Bouverie	389	44.9	−5.7
Conservative	Henry Thoby Prinsep	379	43.8	−5.6
Chartist	Henry Vincent	98	11.3	New
Majority		10	1.1	−0.1
Turnout		866	67.2	−9.6
Registered electors		1,289		
Whig hold		Swing	−0.1	

General election 1847: Kilmarnock Burghs
Party	Candidate	Votes	%	±%
Whig	Edward Pleydell-Bouverie	Unopposed		
Registered electors		1,243		
Whig hold				

=== Elections in the 1850s ===
General election 1852: Kilmarnock Burghs
Party	Candidate	Votes	%	±%
Whig	Edward Pleydell-Bouverie	558	64.9	N/A
Conservative	James Archibald Campbell	302	35.1	New
Majority		256	29.8	N/A
Turnout		860	62.3	N/A
Registered electors		1,380		
Whig hold				

Pleydell-Bouverie was appointed Vice-President of the Board of Trade, requiring a by-election.

By-election, 7 April 1855: Kilmarnock Burghs
Party	Candidate	Votes	%	±%
Whig	Edward Pleydell-Bouverie	Unopposed		
Whig hold				

Pleydell-Bouverie was appointed President of the Poor Law Board, requiring a by-election.

By-election, 16 August 1855: Kilmarnock Burghs
Party	Candidate	Votes	%	±%
Whig	Edward Pleydell-Bouverie	Unopposed		
Whig hold				

General election 1857: Kilmarnock Burghs
Party	Candidate	Votes	%	±%
Whig	Edward Pleydell-Bouverie	Unopposed		
Registered electors		1,414		
Whig hold				

General election 1859: Kilmarnock Burghs
Party	Candidate	Votes	%	±%
Liberal	Edward Pleydell-Bouverie	Unopposed		
Registered electors		1,449		
Liberal hold				

=== Elections in the 1860s ===
General election 1865: Kilmarnock Burghs
Party	Candidate	Votes	%	±%
Liberal	Edward Pleydell-Bouverie	Unopposed		
Registered electors		1,645		
Liberal hold				

General election 1868: Kilmarnock Burghs
Party	Candidate	Votes	%	±%
Liberal	Edward Pleydell-Bouverie	2,892	57.4	N/A
Liberal	Edwin Chadwick	1,148	22.8	N/A
Independent Liberal	Robert Thomson	999	19.8	New
Majority		1,744	34.6	N/A
Turnout		5,039	77.2	N/A
Registered electors		6,531		
Liberal hold		Swing	N/A	

=== Elections in the 1870s ===
General election 1874: Kilmarnock Burghs
Party	Candidate	Votes	%	±%
Liberal	James Fortescue Harrison	3,316	52.3	N/A
Liberal	Edward Pleydell-Bouverie	3,019	47.7	−9.7
Majority		297	4.6	−30.0
Turnout		6,335	79.0	+1.8
Registered electors		8,020		
Liberal hold		Swing	N/A	

=== Elections in the 1880s ===
General election 1880: Kilmarnock Burghs
Party	Candidate	Votes	%	±%
Liberal	John Dick Peddie	3,320	49.5	N/A
Conservative	John Neilson Cuthbertson	2,005	29.9	New
Independent Liberal	Robert Malcolm Kerr	1,384	20.6	New
Majority		1,315	19.6	+15.0
Turnout		6,709	87.1	+8.1
Registered electors		7,700		
Liberal hold		Swing	N/A	

General election 1885: Kilmarnock Burghs
Party	Candidate	Votes	%	±%
Conservative	Peter Sturrock	3,645	40.2	+10.3
Liberal	John Dick Peddie	3,513	38.7	−10.8
Independent Liberal	John Dalrymple	1,862	20.5	−0.1
Ind. Conservative	John Steven Storr	55	0.6	New
Majority		132	1.5	N/A
Turnout		9,075	86.6	−0.5
Registered electors		10,475		
Conservative gain from Liberal		Swing	+11.6	

General election 1886: Kilmarnock Burghs
Party	Candidate	Votes	%	±%
Liberal	Stephen Williamson	4,664	55.2	+16.5
Conservative	Peter Sturrock	3,870	44.8	+4.6
Majority		884	10.4	N/A
Turnout		8,444	80.6	−6.0
Registered electors		10,475		
Liberal gain from Conservative		Swing	+6.0	

=== Elections in the 1890s ===
General election 1892: Kilmarnock Burghs
Party	Candidate	Votes	%	±%
Liberal	Stephen Williamson	5,110	54.1	−1.1
Conservative	Charles Dickson	4,335	45.9	+1.1
Majority		775	8.2	−2.2
Turnout		9,445	84.2	+3.6
Registered electors		11,216		
Liberal hold		Swing	-1.1	

General election 1895: Kilmarnock Burghs
Party	Candidate	Votes	%	±%
Conservative	John Denny	5,432	51.8	+5.9
Liberal	Stephen Williamson	5,051	48.2	−5.9
Majority		381	3.6	N/A
Turnout		10,483	87.2	+3.0
Registered electors		12,027		
Conservative gain from Liberal		Swing	+5.9	

=== Elections in the 1900s ===
General election 1900: Kilmarnock Burghs
Party	Candidate	Votes	%	±%
Conservative	John Denny	6,076	51.6	−0.2
Liberal	Adam Rainy	5,692	48.4	+0.2
Majority		384	3.2	−0.4
Turnout		11,768	86.4	−0.8
Registered electors		13,621		
Conservative hold		Swing	−0.2	

General election 1906: Kilmarnock Burghs
Party	Candidate	Votes	%	±%
Liberal	Adam Rainy	8,268	59.0	+10.6
Conservative	Thomas W McIntyre	5,743	41.0	−10.6
Majority		2,525	18.0	N/A
Turnout		14,011	87.4	+1.0
Registered electors		16,024		
Liberal gain from Conservative		Swing	+10.6	

=== Elections in the 1910s ===
Adam Rainy

General election January 1910: Kilmarnock Burghs
Party	Candidate	Votes	%	±%
Liberal	Adam Rainy	8,937	61.1	+2.1
Conservative	John James Bell	5,701	38.9	−2.1
Majority		3,236	22.2	+4.2
Turnout		14,638	88.9	+2.5
Liberal hold		Swing	+2.1	

W. Gladstone

General election December 1910: Kilmarnock Burghs
Party	Candidate	Votes	%	±%
Liberal	Adam Rainy	8,657	60.9	−0.2
Conservative	James Buyers Black	5,569	39.1	+0.2
Majority		3,088	21.8	−0.4
Turnout		14,226	86.4	−2.5
Liberal hold		Swing		

J.D. Rees

Alex Shaw

Kilmarnock Burghs by-election, 1911
Party	Candidate	Votes	%	±%
Liberal	Will Gladstone	6,923	48.3	−12.6
Conservative	John Rees	4,637	32.4	−6.7
Labour	Thomas McKerrell	2,761	19.3	New
Majority		2,286	15.9	−5.9
Turnout		14,321		
Liberal hold		Swing	-3.0	

Kilmarnock Burghs by-election, 1915
Party	Candidate	Votes	%	±%
Liberal	Alexander Shaw	Unopposed		
Liberal hold				

== See also ==
- Former United Kingdom Parliament constituencies
