= Stephen Williamson =

Scottish shipping company founder and politician

Stephen Williamson (28 June 1827 – 16 June 1903) was a founder of the Liverpool shipping company Balfour Williamson & Co. and a Scottish Liberal Party politician.

== Biography ==
He was born in Cellardyke, Fife in 1827, the son of Archibald Williamson, a shipowner. In 1848 he went to Liverpool, and there founded, with Alexander Balfour, the firm of Balfour Williamson, trading with South America with offices in Valparaíso, Chile and San Francisco. He married Anne Guthrie, the daughter of Dr Thomas Guthrie.

In 1880 he was elected to the House of Commons as Member of Parliament (MP) for St Andrews, a seat he held until 1885, and then represented Kilmarnock Burghs between 1886 and 1895.

Williamson had homes in Copley in Cheshire and Glenogil in Forfarshire. He died at Copley in June 1903 aged 65. His son Archibald Williamson was also a politician and was created Baron Forres in 1922.

== Notes ==
Parliament of the United Kingdom
Preceded by Edward Ellice	Member of Parliament for St Andrews Burghs; 1880–1885	Succeeded by Sir Robert Anstruther
Preceded by Peter Sturrock	Member of Parliament for Kilmarnock Burghs; 1886–1895	Succeeded by John McAusland Denny
