= James Fortescue Harrison =

British politician

James Fortescue Harrison, JP (1819 – 27 February 1905) was a British Liberal Party politician and barrister.

Harrison was born in 1819. He was called to the bar at Lincoln's Inn in 1864.

He was elected at the 1874 general election as the member of parliament (MP) for Kilmarnock Burghs, and held the seat until he stood down at the 1880 general election, and did not stand again.

He was the father of Lady Arthur Hill. Harrison died on 27 February 1905, at the age of 86.

Parliament of the United Kingdom
Preceded by Edward Pleydell-Bouverie	Member of Parliament for Kilmarnock Burghs; 1874 – 1880	Succeeded by John Dick Peddie
