= John Dunlop of Dunlop =

Scottish politician (1806–1839)

Sir John Dunlop, 1st Baronet, of Dunlop (1806 – 3 April 1839) was a British Army officer and politician.

== Life ==
The eldest son of Lieutenant-General James Dunlop of Dunlop, he served in the 1st Grenadier Guards. He was Member of Parliament for Kilmarnock Burghs from 1832 to 1835. Styled Captain John Dunlop of Dunlop at the time of election, he was then created a baronet in 1838.

Dunlop was either a Whig or a Radical. He was succeeded by John Bowring.

== Family ==
Dunlop married:

1. Charlotte Constance, youngest daughter of Major General Sir Richard Downes Jackson, in 1829.
2. Harriet, daughter of Archibald Primrose, 4th Earl of Rosebery.

James Dunlop, 2nd Baronet was son of the first marriage.

Parliament of the United Kingdom
New constituency	Member of Parliament for Kilmarnock Burghs; 1832–1835	Succeeded by John Bowring
Baronetage of the United Kingdom
New creation	Baronet (of Dunlop); 1838–1839	Succeeded by James Dunlop
