= Adam Rolland Rainy =

British politician and surgeon (1862–1911)

Adam Rainy (published in the Illustrated London News)

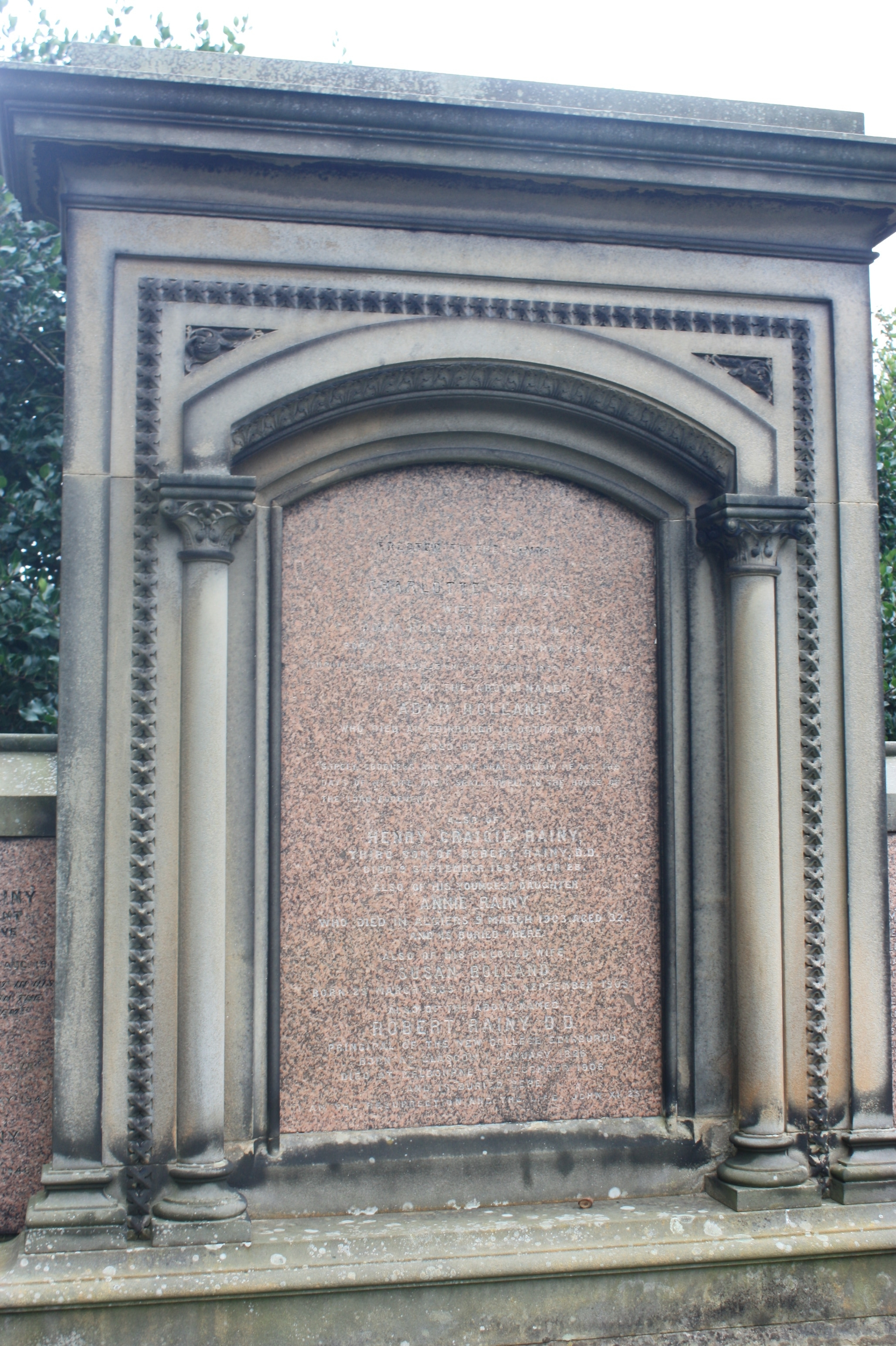
The huge monument to the Rainy family, Dean Cemetery, Edinburgh

Adam Rolland Rainy (3 April 1862 – 26 August 1911) was a Liberal Party politician in Scotland who sat in the House of Commons for Kilmarnock Burghs. By profession he was a surgeon oculist.

== Life ==
He was the son of the Very Rev Robert Rainy DD (1826–1906), Principal of New College, Edinburgh and his wife, Susan Rolland (1835–1905), the granddaughter of Adam Rolland, and was born and raised in Edinburgh.

He is buried in the Rainy family plot in Dean Cemetery in western Edinburgh against the southern retaining wall.

His wife was a leader in the Scottish Women's Liberal Federation and suffragist.

His son, also Adam Rolland Rainy (1889–1926), won the Military Cross in the Royal Artillery in the First World War, but died in Natal.

== Political career ==
In 1900 Rainy embarked on a political career when he stood for parliament at the 1900 General Election. He had been selected as Liberal Party candidate for the marginal Conservative seat of Kilmarnock Burghs. Against the background of the Second Boer War, the Liberal Party made few gains and Rainy was unable to win the seat.

He was re-selected as Liberal candidate and at the 1906 general election he had an easier task on two accounts, the incumbent Conservative Member of Parliament was not re-standing and the elections were held at a better moment for the Liberals who had just assumed office. He gained the seat with ease.

In parliament he sat on the government backbenches, without accepting government office. In 1907 was the Seconder of the Address in the Commons. He was an active supporter of Scottish Home Rule. In 1908 he seconded the motion of Irish leader John Redmond in favour of Home Rule for both Ireland and Scotland.

He sought re-election for Kilmarnock at the next general election in January 1910. The popularity of the Liberals fell from its height of 1906, but despite this, Rainy actually managed to increase his majority; Within 11 months another general election took place, producing an almost identical result both nationally and in Kilmarnock.

He died on 26 August 1911 at the youthful age of 49, causing the 1911 Kilmarnock Burghs by-election. In 1915 his widow Annabelle had published by J. Maclehose the Life of Adam Rolland Rainy, MP.

=== Election results ===
General election 1900: Kilmarnock Burghs
Party	Candidate	Votes	%	±%
Conservative	John McAusland Denny	6,073	51.6	
Liberal	Adam Rolland Rainy	5,692	48.4	
Majority		384	3.2	
Turnout		11,765	86.4	
Conservative hold		Swing		

General election 1906: Kilmarnock Burghs
Party	Candidate	Votes	%	±%
Liberal	Adam Rolland Rainy	8,268	59.0	+10.6
Conservative	Thomas W McIntyre	5,743	41.0	−10.6
Majority		2,525	18.0	21.2
Turnout			87.4	+1.0
Liberal gain from Conservative		Swing	+10.6	

General election January 1910: Kilmarnock Burghs
Party	Candidate	Votes	%	±%
Liberal	Adam Rolland Rainy	8,937	61.1	+2.1
Conservative	John James Bell	5,701	38.9	−2.1
Majority		3,236	22.2	+4.2
Turnout			88.9	
Liberal hold		Swing	+2.1	

General election December 1910: Kilmarnock Burghs
Party	Candidate	Votes	%	±%
Liberal	Adam Rolland Rainy	8,657	60.9	−0.2
Conservative	James Buyers Black	5,569	39.1	+0.2
Majority		3,088	21.8	−0.4
Turnout		14,226	86.4	−2.5
Liberal hold		Swing	-0.2	

Parliament of the United Kingdom
Preceded by John McAusland Denny	Member of Parliament for Kilmarnock Burghs; 1906 – 1911	Succeeded by Will Gladstone
