= Alexander Johnston (Scottish politician) =

Alexander Johnston (1790 – 9 May 1844) was a Scottish Whig Party politician.

He was elected at the 1841 general election as the member of parliament (MP) for Kilmarnock Burghs, and held the seat until his death three years later, aged 53.

Parliament of the United Kingdom
Preceded by John Campbell Colquhoun	Member of Parliament for Kilmarnock Burghs; 1841 – 1844	Succeeded by Edward Pleydell-Bouverie
