= John McAusland Denny =

Scottish businessman and Conservative Party politician (1858-1922)

The Right Honourable John McAusland Denny MP
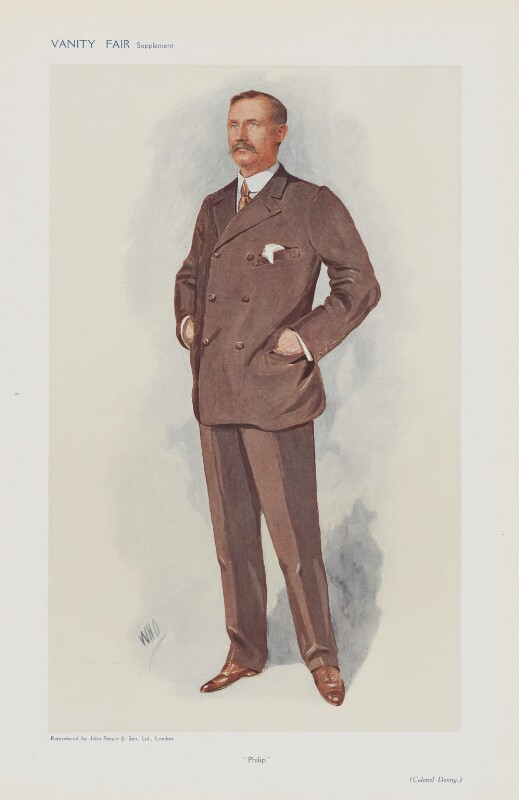
- Col. John Denny caricatured by "WHO" in Vanity Fair, 1910

Member of Parliament for Kilmarnock Burghs
- In office 1895–1906
- Preceded by: Stephen Williamson
- Succeeded by: Adam Rolland Rainy

Personal details
- Parent: Peter Denny (father)

Colonel John McAusland Denny CB DL VD MP (29 November 1858 – 9 December 1922) was a Scottish businessman and Conservative Party politician.

Denny was born in Helenslee, Dumbarton, one of eight sons of Dr. Peter Denny. His grandfather William Denny founded the family shipbuilding firm William Denny and Brothers. He was educated at Dumbarton Academy and in Lausanne and became a shipbuilder and a director of the Lanarkshire and Dumbartonshire Railway company.

He was elected at the 1895 general election as the Member of Parliament (MP) for Kilmarnock Burghs. He was re-elected in 1900, but did not stand at the 1906 general election.

He was a founder member of the Glasgow and West of Scotland Association for Women's Suffrage.

During the First World War, he was chairman of the Dumbartonshire Territorial Force Association, and became an honorary colonel in the Argyll and Sutherland Highlanders, which he was largely responsible for raising. He was made a Companion of the Order of the Bath in the 1917 New Year Honours.

Parliament of the United Kingdom
Preceded by Stephen Williamson	Member of Parliament for Kilmarnock Burghs; 1895–1906	Succeeded by Adam Rolland Rainy
