= Will Gladstone =

British politician (1885-1915)

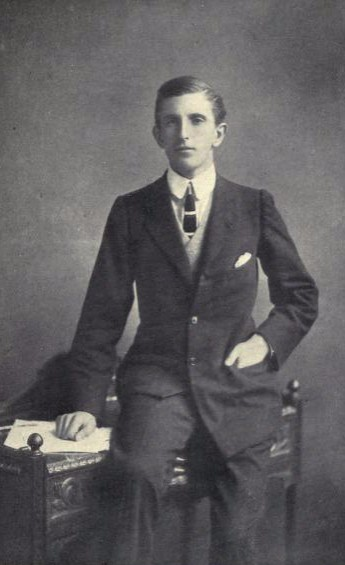

MP for Kilmarnock Burghs
- In office 1911–1915
- Preceded by: Adam Rolland Rainy
- Succeeded by: Alexander Shaw

Lord Lieutenant of Flintshire
- In office 1911–1915
- Preceded by: Hugh Robert Hughes
- Succeeded by: Henry Gladstone

Personal details
- Born: William Glynne Charles Gladstone; 14 July 1885
- Died: 13 April 1915 (aged 29) Laventie, Pas-de-Calais, France
- Resting place: St Deiniol's Church, Hawarden, Flintshire, Wales
- Party: Liberal Party
- Parents: William Henry Gladstone (father); Hon. Gertrude Gladstone (mother)
- Education: Eton College
- Alma mater: New College, Oxford

Military service
- Branch/service: British Army
- Years of service: 1914–1915
- Rank: Lieutenant
- Unit: Royal Welsh Fusiliers
- Battles/wars: World War I; Western Front

William Glynne Charles Gladstone (14 July 1885 – 13 April 1915) was a Liberal Party politician in the United Kingdom, and the last of four generations of Gladstones to sit in the House of Commons, the first being his great-grandfather Sir John Gladstone (1764–1851). His body was the last to be officially repatriated to the United Kingdom during the First World War.

== Early life ==
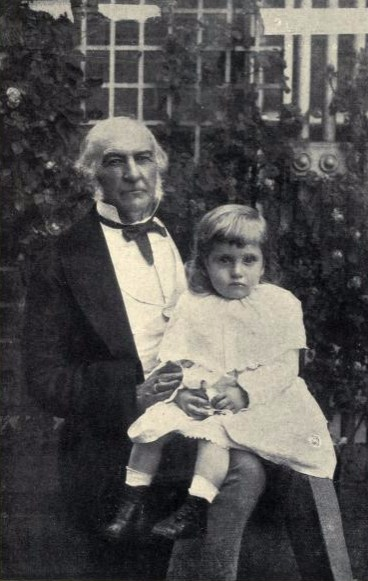
Gladstone as a child in 1887 with his famous grandfather

Gladstone was born on 14 July 1885. His father, William Henry Gladstone (1840–1891), was the eldest son of the Liberal Prime Minister William Ewart Gladstone and his wife Catherine, and his mother was the Hon. Gertrude Gladstone, daughter of Charles Stuart, 12th Lord Blantyre. He inherited from his father the 18th-century Hawarden Castle which had belonged to the family of his grandmother's brother Sir Stephen Glynne, the 9th and last baronet.

He was educated at home before attending Eton and then New College, Oxford. He was president of the Oxford Union in 1907 and graduated with a second class degree.

== Career ==
=== Political career ===
William Gladstone in 1911 around the time of his election as an MP

In 1909, Gladstone was the Assistant Private Secretary to John Hamilton-Gordon, Earl of Aberdeen who was serving as Lord Lieutenant of Ireland. In 1911, he worked for a few months at the British Embassy in Washington, D.C., as an honorary attaché to Lord Bryce.

He stood as the Liberal Party candidate in the Kilmarnock Burghs by-election held on 26 September 1911 and was elected as the member of parliament (MP). A whip in Asquith's government, he was in Parliament for only 4 years.

=== Military service ===
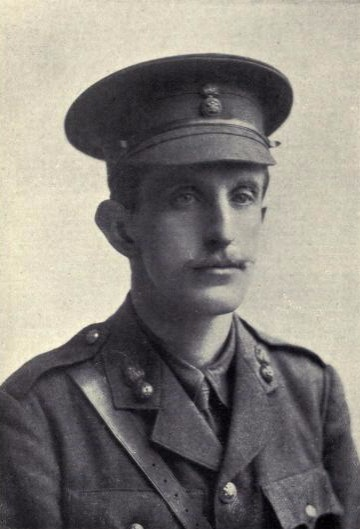
Gladstone in military uniform in 1915

Gladstone was commissioned into the British Army on 15 August 1914 as a second lieutenant (on probation); he had originally wished to enlist as a private but was advised to become an officer. He joined the 3rd Battalion, Royal Welsh Fusiliers and underwent training at Wrexham before going out to France in March 1915. He first came under fire on 23 March. His commission was confirmed and he was promoted to lieutenant on 7 April 1915.

== Death ==
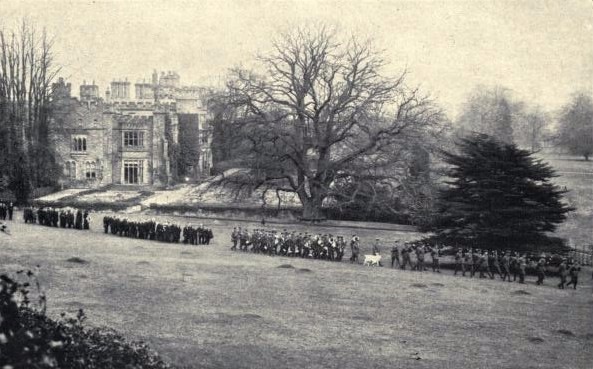
Gladstone's funeral procession leaving Hawarden Castle, Flintshire, Wales, on 23 April 1915

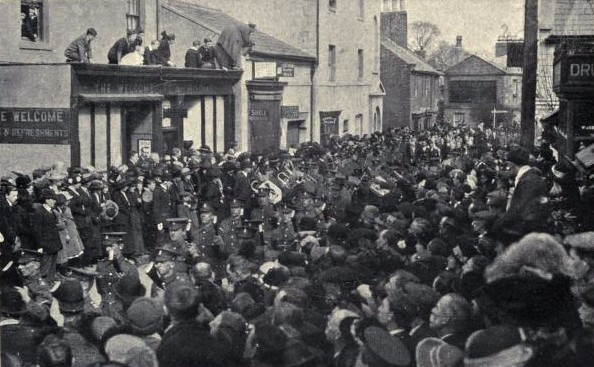
Gladstone's funeral procession passing through the village of Hawarden

On 13 April 1915, he was killed in action near Laventie, three weeks after arriving in France. He was shot by a sniper. He was initially buried in France, but permission was granted by King George V for his body to be brought back to the United Kingdom. Nine days after his death, his body was disinterred and re-buried in the churchyard of St Deiniol's, Hawarden, Flintshire, Wales. Also commemorated on the gravestone is his cousin William Herbert Gladstone, MC, son of Stephen and Annie Gladstone, killed in action in 1918.

As a memorial, a rood was installed at St Deiniol's, Hawarden, and a new theatre and wards at Chester Royal Infirmary. Gladstone is also commemorated on Panel 8 of the Parliamentary War Memorial in Westminster Hall, one of 22 MPs who died during the War to be named on that memorial. Gladstone is one of 19 MPs who fell in the war who are commemorated by heraldic shields in the Commons Chamber. A further act of commemoration came with the unveiling in 1932 of a manuscript-style illuminated book of remembrance for the House of Commons, which includes a short biographical account of the life and death of Gladstone.

After his death, the estate was purchased by an uncle Henry Gladstone, the third son (and seventh child) of William and Catherine. Herbert Gladstone, another uncle, wrote a memoir of him that was published in 1918.

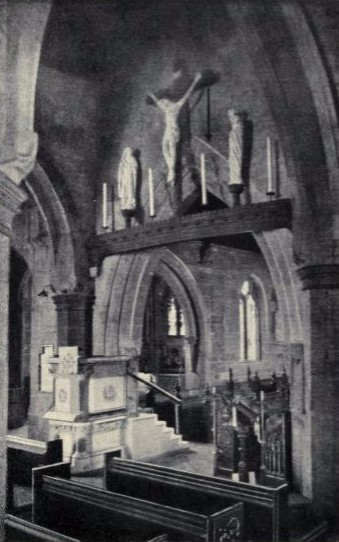
1917 picture of the rood at St Deiniol's Church, Hawarden, designed by Giles Gilbert Scott

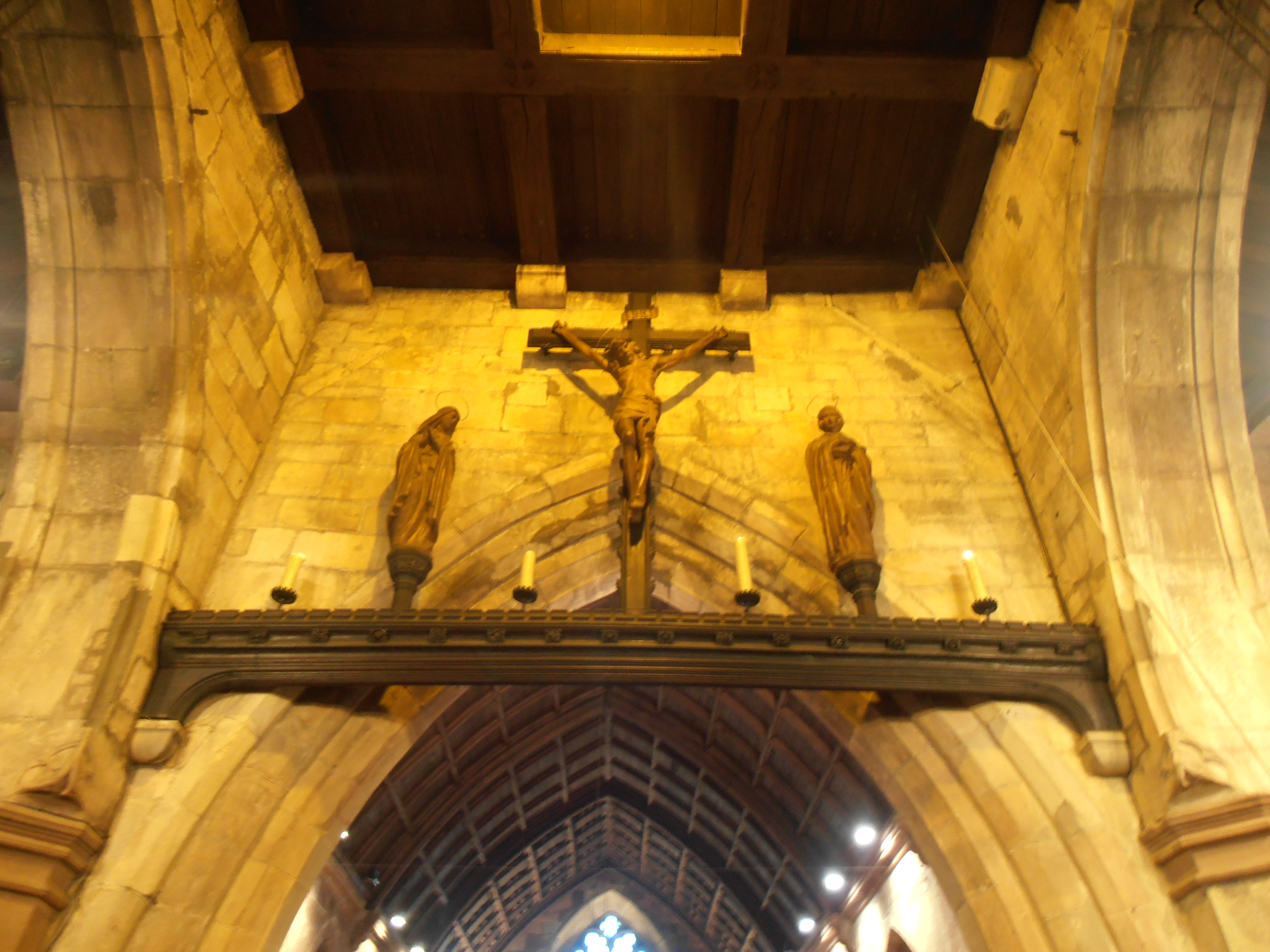
1999 picture of the rood at St Deiniol's Church, Hawarden

== Honours ==
On 8 July 1911, Gladstone was appointed Lord Lieutenant of Flintshire. This appointment also came with the title of Custos Rotulorum of Flintshire.

== Election results ==
Kilmarnock Burghs by-election, 1911 Electorate
Party	Candidate	Votes	%	±%
Liberal	Will Gladstone	6,923	48.3	−12.6
Conservative	John David Rees	4,637	32.4	−6.7
Labour	Thomas McKerrell	2,761	19.3	n/a
Majority		2,286	15.9	−5.9
Turnout		14,321		
Liberal hold		Swing	-3.0	

Parliament of the United Kingdom
Preceded by Adam Rolland Rainy	Member of Parliament for Kilmarnock Burghs; 1911–1915	Succeeded by Alexander Shaw
Honorary titles
Preceded by Hugh Robert Hughes	Lord Lieutenant of Flintshire; 1911–1915	Succeeded by Henry Gladstone
