= John Dick Peddie =

Scottish architect and politician (1824-1891)

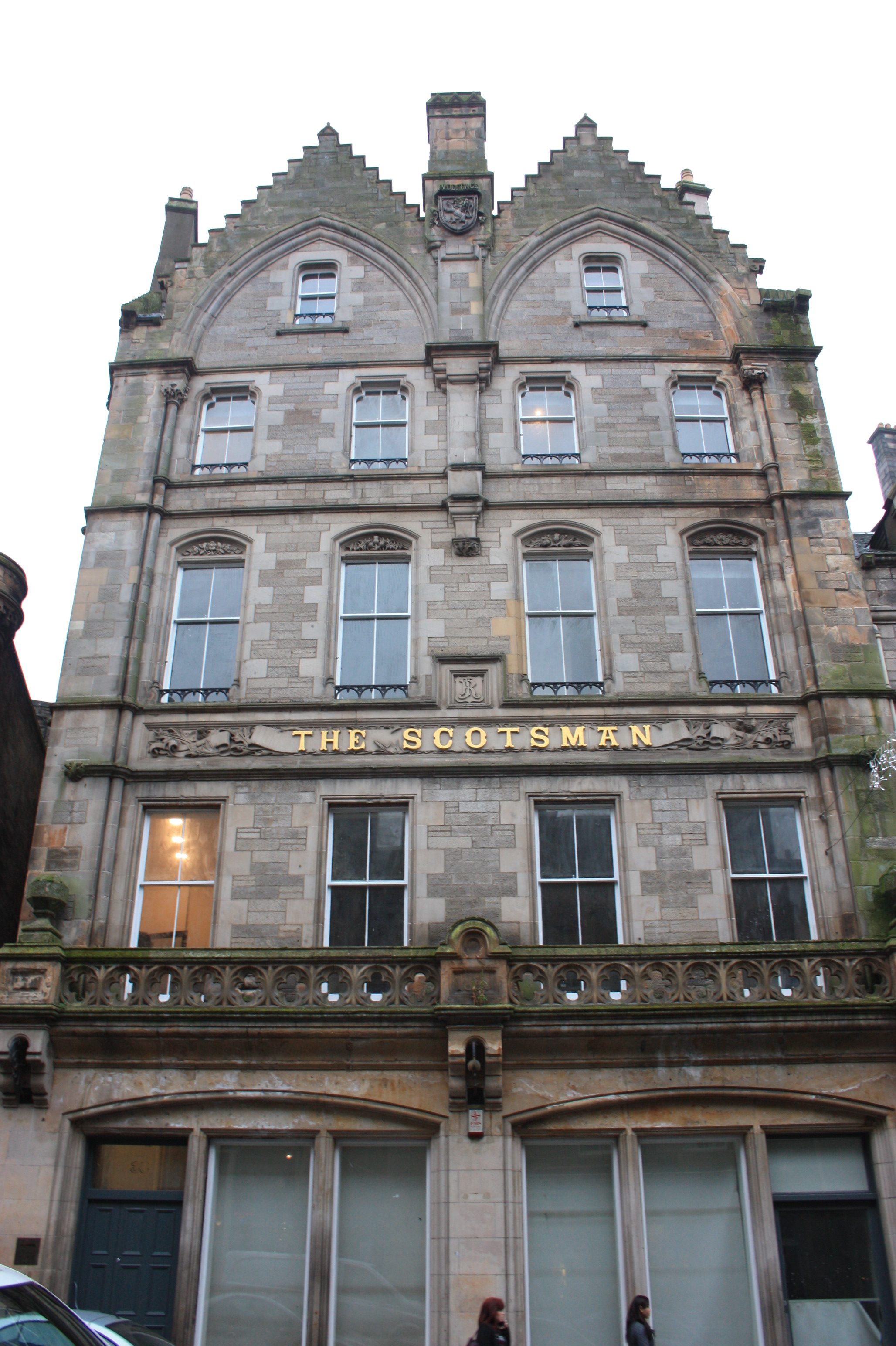
Scotsman Office 1860 by Peddie and Kinnear

John Dick Peddie (24 February 1824 – 12 March 1891) was a Scottish architect, businessman and a Liberal Party politician.

== Biography ==
John Dick Peddie and his twin brother William were the second and third sons of James Peddie WS and Margaret Dick. The twins were educated at the University of Edinburgh, studying law, but in 1842 John was articled to the architect David Rhind. His sons, John More Dick Peddie (1853–1921) and Walter Lockhart Dick Peddie (b.1865) were also architects.

=== Architect ===
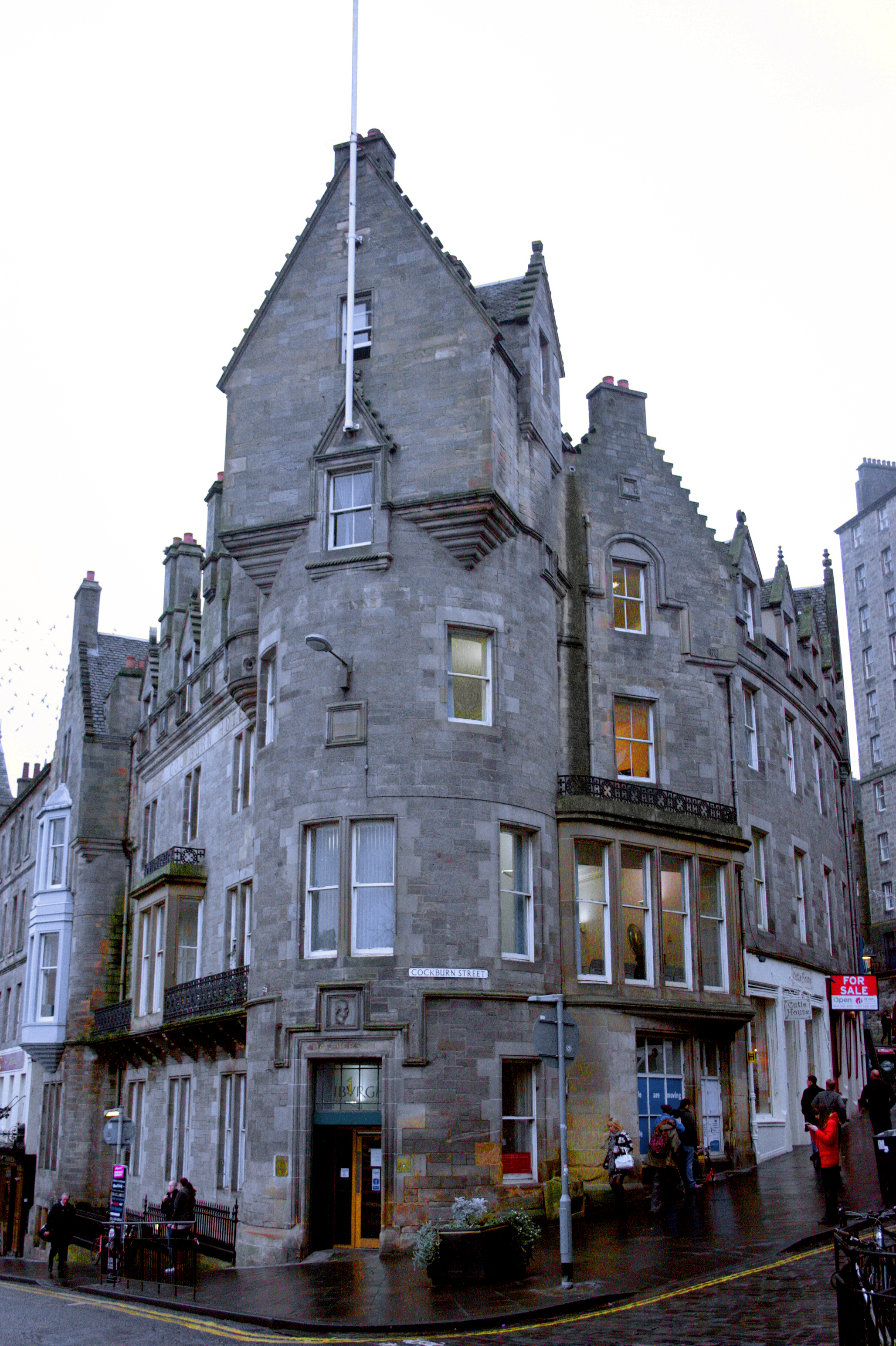
Cockburns Hotel at the foot of Cockburn Street, by Peddie & Kinnear

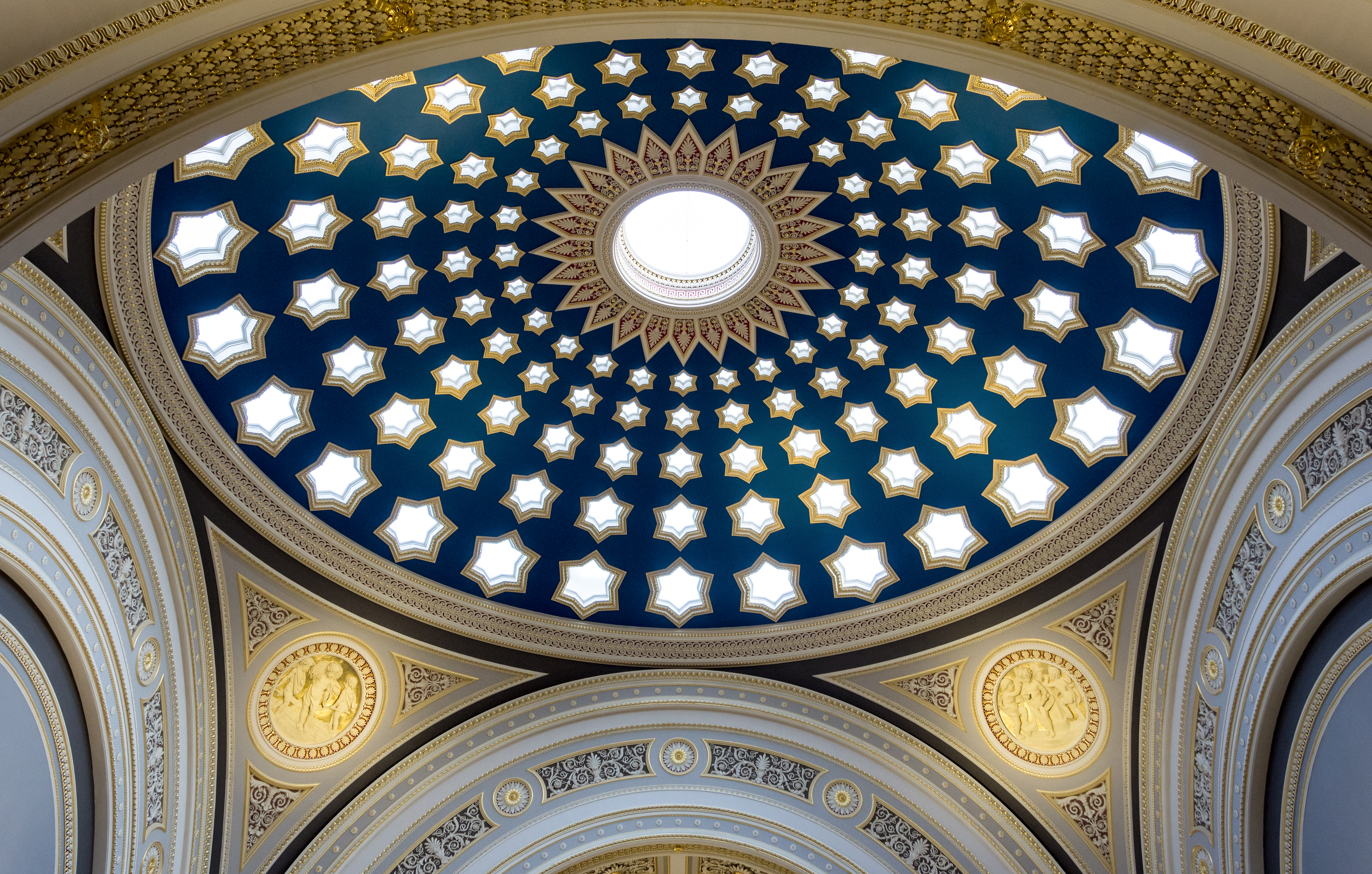
The starry domed ceiling of Peddie's banking hall in Dundas House

Peddie set up his own practice in 1845, winning the competition for the United Presbyterian Synod Hall in Edinburgh (demolished), possibly through the influence of his family, who were prominent members of the United Associate Synod. Through another family connection, his cousin Benjamin Blyth, Peddie also secured work for the Caledonian Railway at their Princes Street station (demolished). He undertook study tours to central and eastern Europe, and on 21 July 1851 he married Euphemia Lockhart More. He was appointed architect to the Royal Bank of Scotland, designing several branches across Scotland in the mid-1850s. In 1857 Peddie was responsible for the addition of an opulent banking hall to Dundas House, the Royal Bank's head office in St Andrew Square, Edinburgh; the large blue domed ceiling pierced with gold stars featured on the Royal Bank's "Islay" series of banknotes which were in circulation 1987–2016.

Peddie was also involved in the creation of Cockburn Street, linking Edinburgh's Royal Mile with Waverley Station, from 1851, which led him to take on his assistant Charles Kinnear as a partner from 1 January 1856. The partnership of Peddie and Kinnear was very successful, winning numerous commissions for churches and public buildings, including the municipal buildings in Aberdeen (1856) and branches of the Bank of Scotland.

Peddie was elected in 1870 as an academician of the Royal Scottish Academy, and served as its secretary for six years. In 1878 his son John More Dick Peddie joined the firm, and the following year John senior retired from practice. In 1887 John senior was reported to be the owner of Muckrach Castle.

=== Politics ===
Peddie secured the Liberal nomination for Kilmarnock in 1878, and was elected at the 1880 general election as the Member of Parliament (MP) for Kilmarnock Burghs, on a disestablishment platform. In 1884 he introduced a private members bill on disestablishment, although it never came to a vote. In Parliament he also represented the Society for the Protection of Ancient Buildings. Peddie narrowly lost his seat in the 1885 general election, due to a split in the Liberal vote. Although Gladstone asked him to consider it, he did not stand again.

=== Family and financial problems ===
Despite great success the family suffered several financial humiliations.

He spent much of his life supporting his unmarried sisters, but also had to support his unmarried brother James Peddie and their father. He had specifically built a house for his father at Lansdowne Crescent in Edinburgh's fashionable west end, but this had to be sold to meet his father's debts and his father thereafter rented accommodation from John on Chalmers Street.

However, the greater shame came when his uncle (his father's brother) Donald Smith Peddie, fled to the US, having been discovered to have embezzled over £75,000 from various parties for whom he acted as accountant. This included religious bodies such as the Friendly Society of Dissenting Ministers. John Peddie made amends as best he could, repaying sums on behalf of his uncle. Although he was certainly not obliged to do this, it would appear an exercise in trying to limit the family shame.

To compound the family's problems, John had invested heavily in several new self-designed Hydropathic Companies (including Dunblane and Craiglockhart) and in 1880 these all went into liquidation. The collapse of the City of Glasgow Bank in the 1880s (which affected most of Scotland's businesses) worsened things further. Peddie sought foreign investments in the US and Australia to win back some of his losses. On a business trip to Australia in 1885 his wife Euphemia (who travelled with him) died suddenly. Her body was returned to Scotland and buried in Dean Cemetery.

Peddie never recovered thereafter, and he died in March 1891.

=== Memorial ===
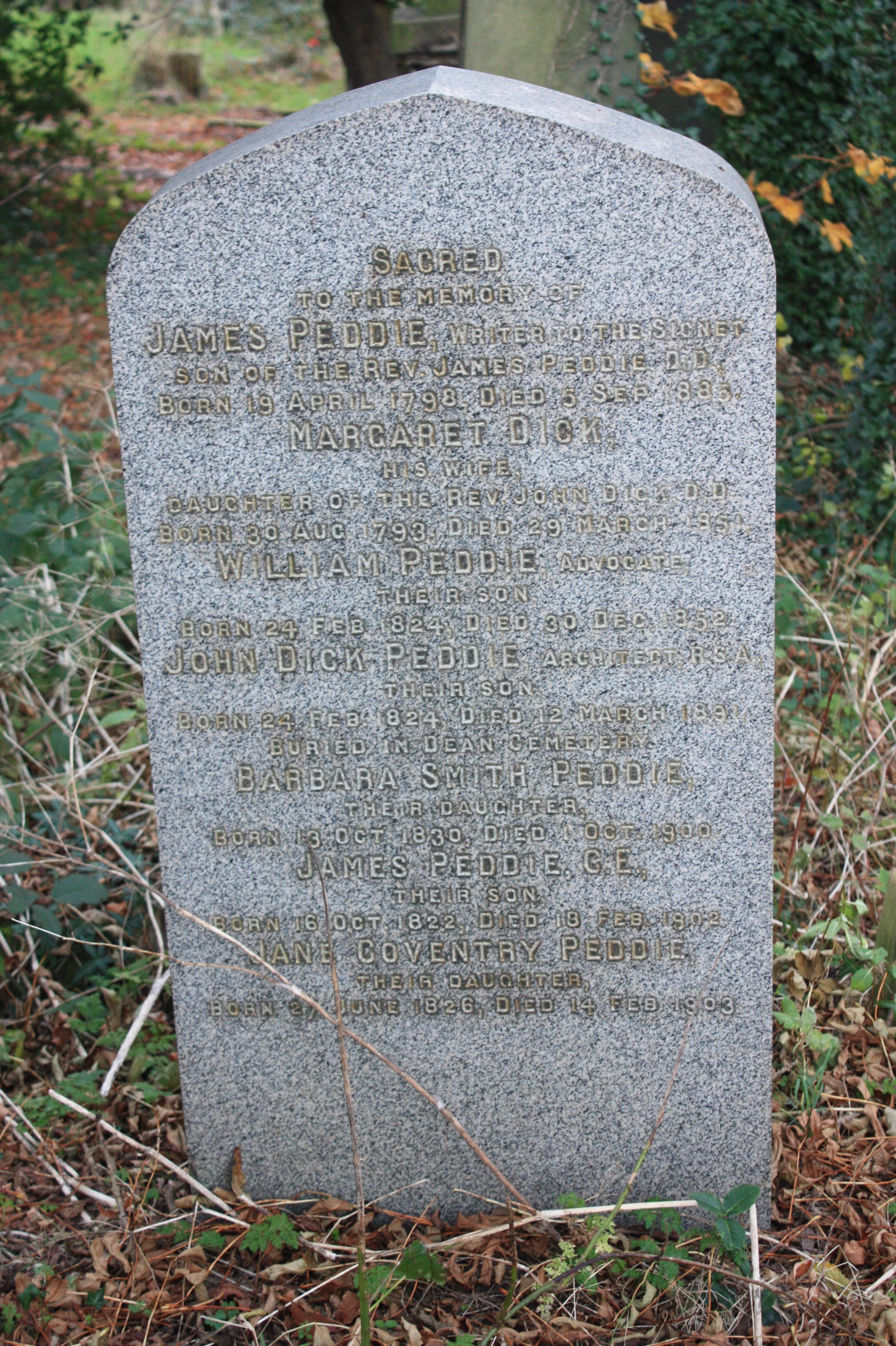
Peddie family grave Warriston Cemetery

Peddie is memorialized on a small monument in Warriston Cemetery beside a far more noticeable red sandstone memorial to his grandfather, the Rev. James Peddie DD. Peddie was the architect for the main extension of Warriston cemetery. His uncle, Dr Alexander Peddie also lies there.

Parliament of the United Kingdom
Preceded by James Harrison	Member of Parliament for Kilmarnock Burghs; 1880 – 1885	Succeeded by Peter Sturrock
