= Association for Latin Liturgy =

Brirish Catholic organisation

The Association for Latin Liturgy is a British lay Catholic organisation which promotes greater use of Latin in the Mass. It was founded in 1969 by Dick Richens who was formerly a member of the Latin Mass Society of England and Wales. Unlike the Latin Mass Society, the Association for Latin Liturgy does not insist on just the Tridentine Mass, but also the Mass of Paul VI in Latin. Indeed, it was because the Latin Mass Society voted not to adopt the New Mass that some members left as they felt that such a move could be considered schismatic. Its stated aims are as follows:

- to promote understanding of the theological, pastoral and spiritual qualities of the liturgy in Latin
- to preserve the sacredness and dignity of the Roman rite
- to secure, for the present and future generations, the Church's unique inheritance of liturgical music
