= Michael Davies (Catholic writer) =

British teacher and writer

- Born: Michael Treharne Davies; 13 March 1936; Yeovil, Somerset, England
- Died: 25 September 2004 (aged 68)
- Education: University of London; St Mary's University, Twickenham
- Occupations: Writer, author

Michael Treharne Davies (13 March 1936 – 25 September 2004) was a British teacher and traditionalist Catholic writer of many books about the Catholic Church following the Second Vatican Council. From 1992 to 2004 he was the president of the international traditionalist Catholic organisation Foederatio Internationalis Una Voce and was responsible for the unification of Una Voce America.

== Life ==
Davies was born to Cyril and Annie (née Garnworthy) Davies. His father, a Welshman, was a Baptist, and his mother, who was English, was an Anglican. Davies was brought up in Yeovil, Somerset, but proud of his Welsh descent. He served as a regular soldier in the Somerset Light Infantry during the Malayan Emergency, the Suez Crisis, and the EOKA campaign in Cyprus.

Davies was a Baptist who converted to Catholicism while still a student in the 1950s. While initially a supporter of the Second Vatican Council, Davies became critical of the liturgical changes that followed in its wake, which he argued were a result of distortions and misreadings of the council's mandates for liturgical reform. Davies later supported the French Archbishop Marcel Lefebvre, founder of the Society of St. Pius X (SSPX), writing a three-volume series titled Apologia Pro Marcel Lefebvre in which he defended Lefebvre against accusations of disobedience and schism for refusing to celebrate the Mass of Paul VI. Although Davies opposed Lefebvre's canonically illicit consecration of four SSPX bishops in 1988 against the wishes of Pope John Paul II, he continued to support Lefebvre's defence of the Tridentine Mass and traditional Church teachings publicly.

William D. Dinges, Professor of Religion and Culture at The Catholic University of America, described Davies as "[i]nternationally, one of the most prolific traditionalist apologists".

Davies was a critic of the alleged apparitions of the Blessed Virgin at Medjugorje, which he believed to be false. His unfinished book on the subject, Medjugorje: The First Twenty-One Years, was finally published in 2023 by Arouca Press; it includes a reminiscence from his son Adrian.

Davies died on 25 September 2004, aged 68, following a battle with cancer and was buried in the churchyard of St. Mary's, Chislehurst, Kent. He was survived by his wife, Marija, one daughter and two sons, one of whom is the barrister Adrian Davies.

== Selected published works ==
- The Liturgical Revolution (Vol. I: Cranmer's Godly Order Roman Catholic Books, vol. II Pope John's Council & vol III Pope Paul's New Mass: Angelus Press) ISBN 978-0912141244
- Apologia Pro Marcel Lefebvre (Angelus Press) is a three volume book in support of the French Archbishop Marcel Lefebvre, founder of the Society of St. Pius X, ISBN 978-0935952193
- The Order of Melchisedech – 255pp, Roman Catholic Books, ISBN 978-0870003943
- Partisans of Error (on Modernism) – 109pp, Neumann Press (1982), ISBN 978-0911845006
- Newman Against the Liberals – 400pp, Roman Catholic Books (out of print)
- The Second Vatican Council and Religious Liberty – 326pp, Neumann Press, ISBN 978-0911845266
- I am with you always (on the Indefectibility of the Church) – 101pp, Neumann Press
- For Altar and Throne – The Rising in the Vendée – 100pp, The Remnant Press, ISBN 978-1890740009
- St John Fisher – 140pp, Neumann Press, ISBN 978-0911845860
- The Wisdom of Adrian Fortescue (edited by M. Davies) – 421pp, Roman Catholic Books, ISBN 978-0912141534
- Liturgical Shipwreck – TAN Books, ISBN 978-0895555359
- Liturgical Timebombs in Vatican 2: Destruction of the Faith Through Changes in Catholic Worship – TAN Books, ISBN 978-0895557735
