= Edward Pleydell-Bouverie =

British politician

The Right Honourable Edward Pleydell-Bouverie FRS
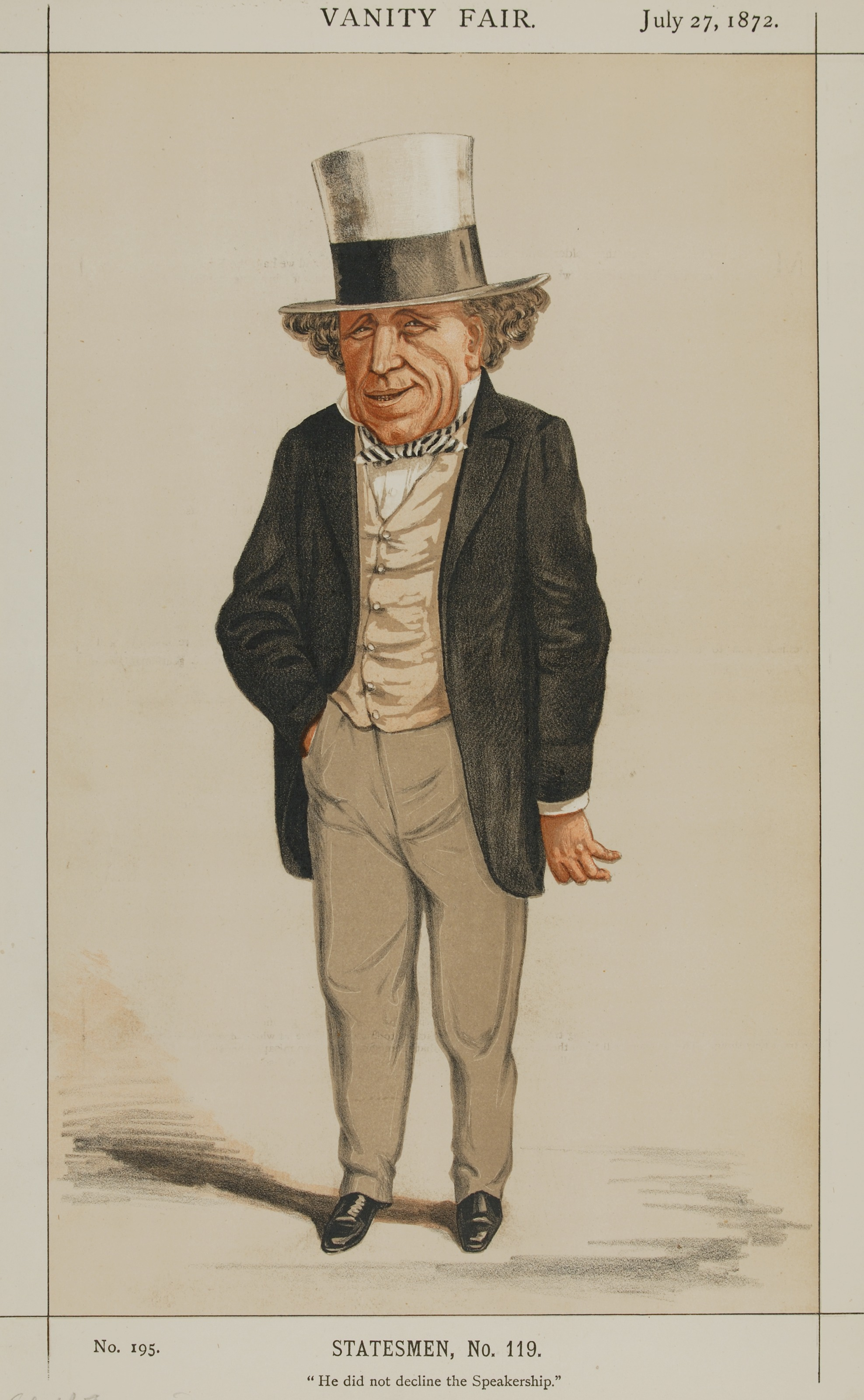
- "He did not decline the Speakership"; Pleydell-Bouverie as caricatured in Vanity Fair, July 1872

Under-Secretary of State for the Home Department
- In office 9 July 1850 – 21 February 1852
- Monarch: Victoria
- Prime Minister: Lord John Russell
- Preceded by: George Cornewall Lewis
- Succeeded by: Sir William Jolliffe, Bt

Paymaster General and Vice-President of the Board of Trade
- In office 31 March 1855 – 13 August 1855
- Monarch: Victoria
- Prime Minister: The Viscount Palmerston
- Preceded by: The Lord Stanley of Alderley
- Succeeded by: Robert Lowe

President of the Poor Law Board
- In office 13 August 1855 – 21 February 1858
- Monarch: Victoria
- Prime Minister: The Viscount Palmerston
- Preceded by: Matthew Talbot Baines
- Succeeded by: Thomas Sotheron-Estcourt

Personal details
- Born: 26 April 1818
- Died: 16 December 1889 (aged 71) 44 Wilton Crescent, London
- Party: Liberal
- Spouse(s): Elizabeth Balfour (d. 1889)
- Education: Trinity College, Cambridge

Edward Pleydell-Bouverie PC, FRS (26 April 1818 – 16 December 1889), styled The Honourable from 1828 to 1855, then The Right Honourable, was a British Liberal politician. He was a member of Lord Palmerston's first administration as Paymaster General and Vice-President of the Board of Trade in 1855 and was President of the Poor Law Board between 1855 and 1858.

== Background and education ==
Pleydell-Bouverie was the second son of William Pleydell-Bouverie, 3rd Earl of Radnor, by his second wife, Anne Judith, third daughter of Sir Henry St John-Mildmay, 3rd Baronet. The family homes were at Longford Castle in Wiltshire and Coleshill House in Berkshire (now Oxfordshire). Jacob Pleydell-Bouverie, 4th Earl of Radnor, was his elder brother. He was educated at Harrow School and Trinity College, Cambridge, graduating as a Master of Arts in 1838. Like a number of his kinsmen, he became an officer in the part-time Royal Berkshire Militia, being commissioned as a captain on 23 February 1838 and was still listed in 1852.

He was a précis writer to Lord Palmerston from January to June 1840 before he was called to the Bar, Inner Temple, on 27 January 1843.

== Political career ==
In 1844 Pleydell-Bouverie was returned to Parliament for Kilmarnock Burghs, a constituency he represented until 1874. He served as Under-Secretary of State for the Home Department in Lord John Russell's first administration from July 1850 to March 1852, and from April 1853 to March 1855 he was Chairman of Committees of the House of Commons, while Lord Aberdeen was prime minister. In March 1855, when Lord Palmerston became premier, Pleydell-Bouverie was made Paymaster General and Vice-President of the Board of Trade, and sworn of the Privy Council. In August of the same year he was transferred to the Presidency of the Poor Law Board, a position he held until 1858. However, he was never a member of the cabinet. In 1857 he was appointed one of the committee of the Council on Education. He was Second Church Estate Commissioner from August 1859 to November 1865, and from 1869 he was one of the Ecclesiastical Commissioners for England.

Though a staunch liberal, Pleydell-Bouverie belonged to the old whig school, and during his last years in parliament often found himself in disagreement with the policies of Liberal prime minister, William Ewart Gladstone. In 1872, when a charge of evasion of the law was made against Gladstone in connection with the appointment he made to the rectory of Ewelme, Pleydell-Bouverie expressed regret "We all have our amusements at various times, but that of the right hon. Gentleman, when he has nothing else to do, is to drive coaches and six through Acts of Parliament".

When the Irish University Bill was introduced in March, Pleydell-Bouverie finally broke with Gladstone. He denounced the measure as miserably bad and scandalously inadequate to its professed object. He voted against the second reading on 10 March, when the government was defeated. Subsequently, in letters addressed to The Times he continued his attacks on the measure and on its framers.

After his retirement from parliament in 1874, Pleydell-Bouverie became in 1877 associated with the Corporation of Foreign Bondholders, and was soon made its chairman. Under his guidance the debts of many countries were readjusted, and the corporation's scheme for dealing with the Turkish debt was confirmed by the sultan's iradé of January 1882. Bouverie was Deputy Chairman of the Mersey Railway at its opening in 1886. He was also director of the Great Western Railway Company and of the Peninsular and Oriental Steam Navigation Company. He addressed numerous letters to The Times newspaper under the signature of "E. P. B."

He was appointed High Sheriff of Wiltshire for 1882–83.

== Family ==
Pleydell-Bouverie married Elizabeth Anne, youngest daughter of General Robert Balfour of Balbirnie, Fife, on 1 November 1842. They lived at Market Lavington Manor in Wiltshire and had two sons, Walter (5 July 1848 – 20 May 1893), a captain in the 2nd Wiltshire Rifle Volunteers, and Edward Oliver (12 December 1856 – 13 May 1938), and three daughters. One, Eglantine, married Augustus Keppel Stephenson, Director of Public Prosecutions from 1884 to 1894. Elizabeth Anne died in August 1889. Pleydell-Bouverie only survived her by four months and died at 44 Wilton Crescent, London, on 16 December 1889, aged 71.

== Notes ==
Parliament of the United Kingdom
Preceded by Alexander Johnston	Member of Parliament for Kilmarnock Burghs; 1844 – 1874	Succeeded by James Fortescue Harrison
Political offices
Preceded by George Cornewall Lewis	Under-Secretary of State for the Home Department; 1850–1852	Succeeded by Sir William Jolliffe
Preceded by The Lord Stanley of Alderley	Paymaster General; March – August 1855	Succeeded by Robert Lowe
Preceded by The Lord Stanley of Alderley	Vice-President of the Board of Trade; March – August 1855	Succeeded by Robert Lowe
Preceded by Matthew Talbot Baines	President of the Poor Law Board; August 1855 – 1858	Succeeded by Thomas Sotheron-Estcourt
Church of England titles
Preceded by The Viscount Eversley	Second Church Estates Commissioner; 1859–1865	Succeeded by Henry Austin Bruce
