= St Deiniol's Church, Hawarden =

Coordinates: 53.1859°N 3.0258°W

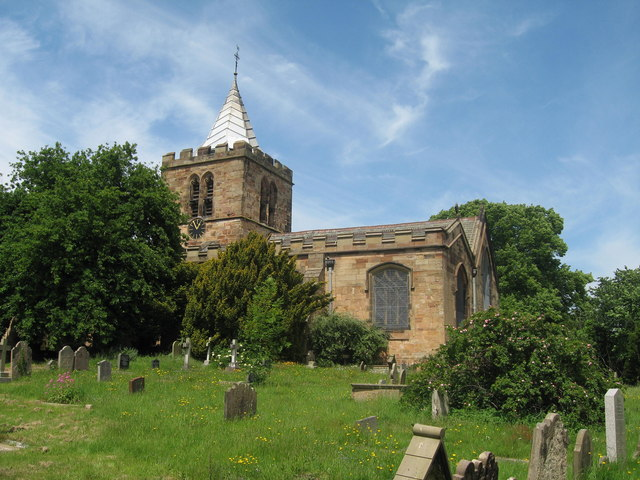
- St Deiniol's Church, Hawarden, from the southeast
- St Deiniol's Church, Hawarden
- OS grid reference: SJ 315,659
- Location: Hawarden, Flintshire
- Country: Wales
- Denomination: Church in Wales
- Churchmanship: Anglo-Catholic
- Website: St Deiniol's Church Hawarden

History
- Status: Parish church
- Dedication: St Deiniol

Architecture
- Functional status: Active
- Heritage designation: Grade II*
- Designated: 2 July 1962
- Architect(s): James Harrison, Sir George Gilbert Scott, Douglas and Fordham, Douglas and Minshull
- Architectural type: Church
- Style: Gothic, Gothic Revival
- Completed: 1909

Administration
- Province: Church in Wales
- Diocese: St Asaph
- Archdeaconry: Wrexham
- Parish: Deeside Mission Area

Clergy
- Rector: The Very Reverend Dr Sarah Rowland Jones

St Deiniol's Church, Hawarden, is in the village of Hawarden, Flintshire, Wales. It is the parish church of the rectorial benefice of Hawarden in the deanery of Hawarden, the archdeaconry of Wrexham, and the diocese of St Asaph. The church has associations with W. E. Gladstone and his family, and is designated by Cadw as a Grade II* listed building.

== History ==
The parish dates back at least 1,000 years and the list of rectors starts in 1180. The church was restored by James Harrison in about 1855–56. However it was badly damaged on 29 October 1857 by a fire which had been started deliberately. Some of the stained glass and woodwork at the east end were not damaged by the fire and the church had been restored by Sir George Gilbert Scott by the end of 1859. In 1896 a porch was added, designed by the Chester firm of architects, Douglas & Fordham. The same firm, then known as Douglas & Minshull designed the Gladstone Memorial Chapel at the east end of the north aisle, built between 1901 and 1903 and in 1908–09 the vestries which were added at the northeast of the church.

== Architecture ==
=== Exterior ===
The plan of the church consists of a nave with north and south aisles, a chancel, a south porch, another porch to the chancel aisle, and northeast vestries. At the east end of the north aisle is the Gladstone Memorial Chapel, which has a three-sided apse, and at the east end of the south aisle is the Whitley Chapel. The tower is central, over the easternmost bay of the nave, in Perpendicular style, with a short lead-covered spire. The church is not cruciform, because it does not have transepts.

=== Interior ===
In the chancel is a sedilia which is dated 1846 but which is probably a restoration of an Early English sedilia. At the east end of the north aisle, but moved from elsewhere, is an ogee-headed piscina. The font was designed by Scott. It is thought that the reredos was also designed by Scott; it depicts the Last Supper behind a tripartite arcade, with a canopy above. The choir stalls, which survived the fire, date from Harrison's restoration. The rood, dating from 1915 to 1916 and by Giles Gilbert Scott, was erected in memory of William Glynne Charles Gladstone. The pulpit dating from about 1951 was designed by H. S. Goodhart-Rendel in a Wren style. In 1884 Edward Frampton created wall paintings in the south aisle of the chancel but, apart from two fragments at the east end, these have disappeared. The processional cross and churchwardens' staves were designed by George Frederick Bodley.

Much of the stained glass in the church consists of memorials to the Glynne and Gladstone families. Three of the windows in the chancel aisle dating from the 1850s are by William Wailes. Five windows elsewhere contain glass designed by Frampton, one of these being a memorial to his own wife. The glass in the west window was made by Morris & Co. in 1898 and was the last stained glass window to be designed by Edward Burne-Jones; it depicts a Nativity scene. The east window was also made by Morris & Co. in 1907 reusing a design by Burne-Jones. Glass elsewhere in the church is by Henry Holiday, F. C. Eden and Haswall.

The Gladstone Memorial Chapel contains a monument to W. E. Gladstone and his wife Catherine designed by Sir William Richmond and completed in 1906. It consists of a sculpture in the Arts and Crafts style which contains literary and other references and Christian symbolism, consisting of recumbent figures in Carrara marble, and an angel forming a canopy. The tomb chest is in a different type of marble with figures and panels in silvered bronze. The altar cross and the candlesticks were also designed by Richmond, as was the stained glass, which was made by James Powell and Sons.

The oldest monument in the church is dated 1722. The monument to Sir Stephen Glynne, who died in 1874, consists of a recumbent effigy by Matthew Noble in a tomb recess designed by John Douglas. An alabaster and mosaic tablet designed by Douglas and Fordham commemorates William Henry Gladstone who died in 1891. Goodhart-Rendel designed tablets to the memory of Herbert Gladstone, 1st Viscount Gladstone (died 1931), Gertrude Gladstone (1935) and Rev S. E. Gladstone (1920). Also in the church is a palimpsest brass on one side of which is an inscription dated 1684 and, on the other side, part of the figures of a man and his wife dating from about 1630.

Inside the church is a very detailed 1/48 scale model of the church, built by locals Robert Rowlands, Louis Sharkie and Richard Williams over several years.

== External features ==
In the churchyard is a baluster sundial, and a South African War Memorial from the early 1900s, which is probably by Douglas and Minshull. The south gates to the churchyard, dating from 1877, were by Douglas. To the northwest of the church is a lychgate designed by Sir Herbert Baker in 1929, consisting of a pyramidal roof on ogee timber framing.

The churchyard contains 57 Commonwealth war graves of service personnel, 9 from World War I and 48 (predominately Royal Air Force) from World War II. Among those from the former war buried here is the politician William Glynne Charles Gladstone, a grandson of the Prime Minister, killed in action in 1915.

== See also ==
- St Deiniol's, Curious Clwyd
- List of church restorations, amendments and furniture by John Douglas
- List of churches in Flintshire
