= CIEL UK =

Roman Catholic society in Britain

CIEL UK (Centre international d'études liturgiques – UK) is the British branch of CIEL. CIEL is an international Roman Catholic society dedicated to scholarly analysis and pastoral familiarity of the Roman Catholic Church liturgy (commonly referred to as the Tridentine Mass).

Each year CIEL UK organises an annual High Mass and conference in London and publishes English translations of the proceedings of the international CIEL Colloquia.

== History ==
=== 2008 Mass and Conference ===
The 2008 Mass and Conference took place on 31 May. The theme was "The Liturgical Reforms of Benedict XVI" and a paper was given by Rev Dr Alcuin Reid.

=== 2007 Mass and Conference ===
The 2007 Annual Mass and conference took place at the London Oratory on 19 May. The Mass was celebrated by Rev. Fr. Ignatius Harrison. The Mass setting was Giovanni Pierluigi da Palestrina's Missa Brevis, sung by the Choir of the London Oratory and directed by Patrick Russell. The theme was 'The liturgical devotions to Our Lady'. The speakers were Msgr. Michael Schmitz from the Institute of Christ the King and Rev. Fr. Jerome Bertram, Cong. Orat. from the Oxford Oratory.

== See also ==
- CIEL France
- Indult Catholic
- Una Voce
- London Oratory
- Latin Mass Society of England and Wales
- Institute of Christ the King
- FSSP
