= Craigmyle =

Craigmyle is a surname. The surname is also sometimes spelt Craigmile, and is thought to come from the name-place in Kincardine O'Neil parish, Aberdeenshire.

Baron Craigmyle is a title in the Peerage of the United Kingdom.

It may refer to:

- Bessie Craigmyle, Scottish poet (1863–1933)
- Peter Craigmyle, soccer referee (1894–1979)

== See also ==
- Craigmyle, Alberta, a hamlet in Canada
