= William Stewart (ILP politician) =

Scottish socialist activist

William Stewart (8 July 1856 – 27 August 1947) was a Scottish socialist activist and prominent figure in the Independent Labour Party.

Born in Dunfermline, Stewart became a yarn dresser in a linen factory. From his youth, he began regularly writing to local newspapers about political and literary topics. When a parish council was created for the town, he was elected to it, and he also launched a socialist newspaper, The Worker.

In 1899, Stewart moved to Glasgow, to work for the Independent Labour Party's (ILP) newspaper, the Labour Leader. He also contributed a weekly article to The Clarion. During the late 1900s, he represented Scotland on the National Administrative Committee of the ILP, then in 1912, he became the secretary of its Scottish Divisional Council of the ILP.

Stewart wrote a number of books, including Fighters for Freedom, The Nativity of Adam, Robert Burns and the Common People, Keir Hardie: a Biography, and War Time and Other Times Impression. He retired in 1933.

Party political offices
Preceded by New position	Scottish Division representative on the Independent Labour Party National Administrative Council; 1906–1909	Succeeded by Thomas McKerrell
Preceded by George Dallas	Secretary of the Scottish Divisional Council of the Independent Labour Party; 1912–1933	Succeeded by James Carmichael
