= Una Voce =

Catholic organization promoting the Tridentine Mass

Fœderatio Internationalis Una Voce
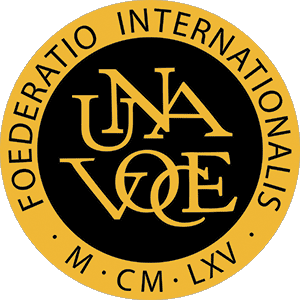
- Logo of the Una Voce International Federation
- Formation: 8 January 1967; 59 years ago
- President: Joseph Shaw
- Key people: Dr Eric Vermehren de Saventhem (founding president), Michael Davies
- Affiliations: Catholic Church

The Fœderatio Internationalis Una Voce or simply Una Voce (Latin for "[with] one voice") is an international federation of Catholic lay organizations attached to the Tridentine Mass.

== History ==
The Una Voce movement emerged in 1964, when Norwegian psychologist and writer Borghild Krane appealed to Catholics to form national associations for the preservation of the traditional liturgy. A number of national associations were subsequently established in 1964 and 1965.

Representatives of six of these associations met in Rome in 1965. The Fœderatio Internationalis Una Voce (FIUV) was formally established in Zurich on 8 January 1967.

Traditional Latin Mass organized by Una Voce Japan at Koenji Catholic Church, Tokyo, in July 2026

The organization argues that while the Second Vatican Council introduced vernacular liturgies, it did not forbid the Latin Mass, and that regular weekday and Sunday Masses in Latin should be maintained. The organization also seeks to promote Latin Gregorian chant, sacred polyphony and sacred art. Unlike some other Catholic traditionalist organizations, Una Voce seeks to remain in full communion with the Pope, and asserts that the Tridentine and vernacular Masses should be allowed to co-exist. Among its prominent early members were the composers Maurice Duruflé and Olivier Messiaen.

FIUV members value the traditional Latin Mass as a direct link with the early Church and as a means of conveying the mystery and majesty of God, but have been criticized for elitism and for an emphasis on private religious devotion. The group has been described as an "arch-conservative" organization by Episcopal Church organist James E. Frazier. Members of FIUV, however, reject comparisons with fundamentalism.

FIUV welcomed the 2005 election of Joseph Cardinal Ratzinger as Pope Benedict XVI. Before his election as pope, Ratzinger had spoken at a conference and praised FIUV's role in supporting the use of the Roman Missal within guidelines established by the Holy See.

== Membership ==
The Federation covers 42 member associations in the following countries and territories: Argentina, Australia, Austria, Belarus, Belgium, Brazil, Canada, Chile, Costa Rica, Colombia, Croatia, Cuba, Czech Republic, Estonia, Finland, France, Germany, India, Ireland, Italy, Japan, Latvia, Malta, Mexico, the Netherlands, New Zealand, Nigeria, Norway, Peru, the Philippines, Poland, Portugal, Russia, Singapore, South Africa, Spain, Switzerland, Taiwan, Ukraine, the United Kingdom (England and Wales, Scotland), and the United States (and Puerto Rico).

Requests for information and assistance have come from Denmark, Honduras, Hungary, Indonesia, Kenya, Korea, Lithuania, Luxembourg, Panama, Malaysia (Sarawak) and Slovenia.

== Council ==
At the XXVI General Assembly, held in Rome on 28 October 2023, the present Council was:

- President: Dr. Joseph Shaw (Latin Mass Society of England and Wales)
- President d’Honneur: Jacques Dhaussy (Una Voce France)
- Vice Presidents: Don Felipe Alanís Suárez (Una Voce Mexico) and Jack Oostveen (Ecclesia Dei Delft, Netherlands)
- Secretary: Andris Amolins (Una Voce Latvia)
- Treasurer: F. Monika Rheinschmitt (Pro Missa Tridentina, Germany)
- Patrick Banken (Una Voce France)
- David Reid (Una Voce Canada)
- Jarosław Syrkiewicz (Una Voce Polonia)
- Fabio Marino (Una Voce Italy)
- Rubén Peretó Rivas (Una Voce Argentina)
- Catharina Chen (Una Voce Sinica, China)

== See also ==
- Preconciliar rites after the Second Vatican Council
- Traditionalist Catholicism
