= 1915 Kilmarnock Burghs by-election =

UK Parliamentary by-election

The 1915 Kilmarnock Burghs by-election was held on 28 May 1915. The by-election was held due to the incumbent Liberal MP, William Glynne Gladstone, being killed in action in the First World War. It was won by the Liberal candidate Hon. Alexander Shaw, who was unopposed. It was the last election held in Kilmarnock Burghs before the seat was abolished in 1918.
