= Thomas McKerrell =

Scottish trade unionist and politician

- Born: 1877; Scotland
- Died: 21 December 1922; Charing Cross, London, England
- Occupations: Trade unionist, bailie, politician
- Political party: Independent Labour Party

Thomas McKerrell (1877 – 21 December 1922) was a Scottish trade unionist and politician.

Born in Scotland, McKerrell moved to South Africa to work as a coal miner with his brother David, although he left around the onset of the Second Boer War. He returned to Scotland, settling in Kilmarnock, where he married in 1899, and joined the Independent Labour Party (ILP) around this time. He was elected as a councillor in Kilmarnock, and also became a bailie there. He was appointed as agent of the Ayrshire Miners' Union, and through this served on the executive of both the Scottish Miners' Federation and the Miners' Federation of Great Britain; and as vice-chairman of the Scottish Trades Union Congress.

The ILP was affiliated to the Labour Party, and McKerrell was selected to stand for Labour in Midlothian at the January 1910 general election. However, he withdrew from the contest at short notice. In November 1910, he was adopted as a last-minute candidate for Liverpool Kirkdale at the December general election, taking 41.6% of the vote, a small reduction for the party's performance earlier in the year.

McKerrell next stood in the 1911 Kilmarnock Burghs by-election where, as a supporter of women's suffrage, he received significant support from the local branches of the National Union of Women's Suffrage Societies. Despite this, he could take only third place, with 17.3% of the votes cast.

McKerrell's brother, David, had returned to mine in South Africa, and became a leader of a strike in the early 1910s. As a result, he was deported back to Scotland, where he stayed with Tom and briefly became a prominent speaker, but died soon after.

McKerrell was a supporter of British involvement in World War I, although he opposed conscription, and in 1917 he resigned his union posts to become an official in the Ministry of Labour. This required him to move to London, while his wife remained in Kilmarnock; the two drifted apart, and in 1921, McKerrell asked for a separation. He appeared to regret this decision, and was lined up for a move to the Ministry's Scottish office, but his wife would not take him back.

In December 1922, McKerrell took his own life by jumping in front of an Underground train at Charing Cross. The inquest concluded that, in addition to his marital problems, he had been suffering from delusions that there was a conspiracy against him.

Party political offices
Preceded by William Stewart	Scottish Division representative on the Independent Labour Party National Administrative Council; 1909–1912	Succeeded by James A. Allan
