= Latin Mass Society of England and Wales =

British Catholic organization

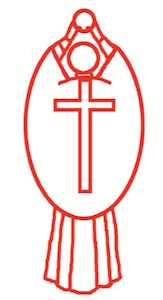
- LMS logo
- Abbreviation: LMS
- Formation: 1965 (61 years ago)
- Headquarters: 11–13 Macklin Street, London
- Chairman: Joseph Shaw
- General manager: Richard Pickett
- Affiliations: Catholic Church

The Latin Mass Society of England and Wales (LMS) is a Catholic society dedicated to making the Extraordinary Form of the Roman Rite, also known as the Tridentine Mass, more widely available in England and Wales. The group organised a petition for the Latin Mass in England and Wales which the Archbishop of Westminster, John Cardinal Heenan, presented to Pope Paul VI, who granted a papal indult in 1971.

The current chairman is the academic Joseph Shaw.

== History ==
The Latin Mass Society was founded in 1965 to seek the preservation of the rites of worship and the use of Latin, continuing the practice of the church from early times. It followed a letter in The Catholic Herald (22 January 1965) by Hugh Byrne, calling for the establishment of "a national Latin Mass Society ... which will aim at campaigning for at least one Latin Low Mass in every church on Sundays." The founding meeting was on 10 April 1965; the first president of the society was the Catholic apologist and skiing pioneer Sir Arnold Lunn. Along with Evelyn Waugh and Hugh Ross Williamson, Lunn was one of the main figures involved in founding the Latin Mass Society.

In the context of the introduction of the New Order of Mass (it was celebrated from the first Sunday of Advent of 1969), the society had to decide whether to campaign for celebrations of the reformed Mass in Latin, or for celebrations using the older liturgical books. The question was debated at the annual general meeting of 1969, with the writer Hugh Ross Williamson speaking against the new rite and other speakers, such as the botanist Richard Hook Ritchens, in its favour. Williamson's arguments carried the day and a group subsequently left the society to set up the Association for Latin Liturgy in 1970, headed by Ritchens.

Alfred Marnau headed the major project of organising a petition signed by 56 international cultural figures to seek permission for the continuing use of the older liturgical books. The then Archbishop of Westminster, Cardinal John Heenan, presented this to Pope Paul VI who granted this permission, a papal indult, in 1971, under which any bishop in England and Wales could permit celebration of the Traditional Latin Mass for the benefit of a group of the faithful.

Archbishop Annibale Bugnini describes the reception of the petition as follows.

At an audience of October 29, 1971, Cardinal Heenan had told the Pope of the discomfort of groups of converts and of elderly people who wanted to be able to celebrate Mass according to the old rite on special occasions. The next day the Pope wrote to Father Bugnini in his own hand: "... I think, in agreement with the Cardinal Archbishop, that a favourable answer, cast in the proper formulas, should be given to the first request, and to the second as well, wherever special circumstances justify the concession. The Cardinal who is making the petition deserves every respect and confidence."

This was the first explicit confirmation that the older books could continue in use, not only by older priests celebrating in private, but for the benefit of the lay faithful; however, it applied only to England and Wales. Under this and later indults the society was the principal body negotiating with bishops for Masses to be celebrated, making practical arrangements for these celebrations, and keeping Catholics attached to the older form of the liturgy informed about them.

In 1984 Pope John Paul II granted an indult to every bishop in the world allowing the celebration of the Mass according to the Roman Missal of 1962. He reiterated this permission in 1988 in the motu proprio, Ecclesia Dei. In 2007 Pope Benedict XVI's motu proprio, Summorum Pontificum, ruled that explicit permission from local bishops was not necessary for a priest's celebration of the 1962 books, and coined the term "the Extraordinary Form" for these celebrations. This decision was reverted by Pope Francis in 2021 through the motu proprio, Traditionis custodes, which stated that the celebration of the Tridentine Mass was to be subjected to the permission of the local bishop. These restrictions to the celebration of the Latin Mass led to an increase in membership in the Latin Mass Society.

== Activities ==
Throughout its history, the Latin Mass Society has facilitated and advertised Extraordinary Form Masses all over England and Wales. It has also arranged numerous pilgrimages to shrines in England and Wales and also overseas. It usually holds two special Masses a year in Westminster Cathedral: one for its annual general meeting in the spring or summer and another for its annual requiem in November.

In anticipation of the promulgation of Pope Benedict XVI's motu proprio, Summorum Pontificum in 2007, the Society organised its first residential training conferences for priests wanting to learn to celebrate the Extraordinary Form; these have continued at least annually since then in a variety of locations.

Since 2012 the society has organised a biennial one-day conference in London with lay and clerical speakers.

The society publishes a quarterly magazine, Mass of Ages.

== Structure ==
The management of the society is in the hands of a committee (trustees), who are elected by the membership, with the help of a small paid staff in its London office and its network of representatives. It has one or more representative in each of the dioceses of England and Wales who are responsible for local events.

== Patrons ==
Patrons of the society are currently John Smeaton; Professor Thomas Pink; Sir James MacMillan CBE; Charles Moore, Baron Moore of Etchingham; Sir Edward Leigh; the Lord Gill KSG and Sir Adrian FitzGerald. Former patrons include Rupert, Fürst zu Löwenstein-Wertheim-Freudenberg and Colin Mawby KSG.

== See also ==
- Indult
- Una Voce
- CIEL UK
- Priestly Fraternity of St. Peter (FSSP)
- Association for Latin Liturgy
