= Joseph Shaw (philosopher) =

British philosopher (born 1971)

The Honourable Joseph Shaw FRSA
- Born: Alexander Joseph Ranald Shaw; 1971 (age 54–55)
- Parents: Anthea Craigmyle, Lady Craigmyle; Thomas Shaw, 3rd Baron Craigmyle

Academic background
- Education: University of Oxford
- Thesis: Authority and Obligation (2000)

Academic work
- Discipline: Philosophy
- Sub-discipline: Ethics; philosophy of religion
- School or tradition: Traditionalist Catholicism
- Institutions: St Benet's Hall, Oxford
- Website: casuistrycentral.blogspot.com

Alexander Joseph Ranald Shaw (born 1971) is a British philosopher. He serves as chairman of the Latin Mass Society, an organisation devoted to propagation of the Catholic Church's Tridentine Mass, and as president of Una Voce.

Shaw is the son of the late Thomas Shaw, 3rd Baron Craigmyle and Anthea Craigmyle (née Rich). He was educated at Ampleforth College and the University of Oxford.

He was a tutorial fellow in philosophy at St Benet's Hall, Oxford, until its closure in September 2022. His main areas of interest are practical ethics, the philosophy of religion and medieval philosophy. In 2015, he was elected a fellow of the Royal Society of Arts. A traditionalist Catholic, Shaw was a signatory of the 2017 "filial correction" Correctio filialis de haeresibus propagatis, which ascribed heretical content to Pope Francis's apostolic exhortation Amoris laetitia. Shaw was also an early critic of Pope Francis’s motu proprio Traditionis custodes, which abrogated permissions for celebration of the Tridentine Mass.
