= Alexander Shaw, 2nd Baron Craigmyle =

Scottish politician (1883–1944)

The Right Honourable The Lord Craigmyle
- Portrait of Shaw by Walter Stoneman, 1921

Member of Parliament for Kilmarnock Kilmarnock Burghs (1915–1918)
- In office 28 May 1915 – 12 November 1923
- Preceded by: Will Gladstone
- Succeeded by: Robert Climie

Personal details
- Born: Alexander Shaw; 28 February 1883
- Died: 29 September 1944 (aged 61)
- Party: Liberal (Before 1916, 1923–1944)
- Other political affiliations: Coalition Liberal (1916–1922); National Liberal (1922–1923)
- Spouse: Margaret Cargill Mackay (m. 1913)
- Children: 4, including Thomas
- Parents: Thomas Shaw (father); Elspeth Forrest (mother)
- Education: George Watson's College
- Alma mater: University of Edinburgh; Trinity College, Oxford
- Occupation: Lawyer

Military service
- Branch/service: Royal Marines
- Battles/wars: World War I; Battle of the Somme

Alexander Shaw, 2nd Baron Craigmyle (28 February 1883 – 29 September 1944) was a Scottish Liberal Party politician.

== Early life and education ==
Alexander Shaw was born 28 February 1883. He was educated at George Watson's College, Edinburgh, the University of Edinburgh and Trinity College, Oxford (where he was President of the Oxford Union in 1905). A lawyer by profession, he was called to the bar in 1908.

During the First World War he served in the Royal Marine Artillery and was involved in the Battle of the Somme. Outside Parliament, he was a director of the Bank of England and Chairman of P & O.

The son of the Law Lord Thomas Shaw, 1st Baron Craigmyle, he succeeded to the peerage on his father's death in 1937.

== Parliamentary career ==
He was elected unopposed as the member of parliament (MP) for the Kilmarnock Burghs at a by-election in 1915, and held the seat until its abolition for the 1918 general election. He was then elected as a Coalition Liberal for the new county constituency of Kilmarnock, retaining the seat as a Liberal in 1922. He resigned from the House of Commons on 12 November 1923 by the procedural device of accepting a nominal appointment as Steward of the Chiltern Hundreds. No by-election was held, and the seat remained vacant when Parliament was dissolved on 16 November for the 1923 general election.

== Personal life and death ==
In 1913, he married Lady Margaret Cargill Mackay, who gave him one son and three daughters.

Upon his own death in 1944, aged 61, he was succeeded by his only son Thomas Donald Mackay Shaw (1923–1998).

== Arms ==
Coat of arms of Alexander Shaw, 2nd Baron Craigmyle

Crest
A demi-savage holding in his dexter hand a club resting on his shoulder Proper.
Escutcheon
Ermine a fir tree growing out of a mount in base Proper between two piles Azure issuing from a chief Gules charged with a scroll Argent with seal pendant Proper.
Supporters
Misericordia Fidelitas Jus (Mercy Fidelity Right)

Parliament of the United Kingdom
Preceded by Will Gladstone	Member of Parliament for Kilmarnock Burghs; 1915–1918	Constituency abolished
New constituency	Member of Parliament for Kilmarnock; 1918–1923	Succeeded by Robert Climie
Honorary titles
Preceded by Hon. George Colville	High Sheriff of the County of London; 1931–1932	Succeeded by Sir Ernest Benn, Bt
Peerage of the United Kingdom
Preceded by Thomas Shaw	Baron Craigmyle; 1937–1944	Succeeded by Thomas Shaw
