= Peter Sturrock (MP) =

Peter Sturrock (5 February 1820 – 7 March 1904) was a Scottish civil engineer, colliery owner and provost of Kilmarnock and a Conservative politician.

Sturrock was the son of David Sturrock, of Struthers, near Kilmarnock and his wife Helen Woodbum. He was educated at Kilmarnock Academy and at Glasgow. Sturrock married Helen Hutchinson Guthrie in 1850. He was a civil engineer, a colliery owner, and a director of North British Canadian Investment Co., and Scottish Ontario Land Co. He was provost of Kilmarnock and a justice of the peace for Ayrshire He was one of the founders and president of the Kilmarnock Burns Club.

He was elected at the 1885 general election as the Member of Parliament (MP) for Kilmarnock Burghs, with a majority of only 132 votes, but was defeated at 1886 general election.

Sturrock purchased Baltesan Castle with the intention of restoring it, but the plans never came to fruition.

Sturrock died at the age of 83.

Parliament of the United Kingdom
Preceded by John Dick Peddie	Member of Parliament for Kilmarnock Burghs; 1885 – 1886	Succeeded by Stephen Williamson
