= Gladstone (surname) =

Gladstone is the surname of:

- Arthur Gladstone Wallis, Canadian politician
- Catherine Gladstone (1812–1900), wife of William Ewart Gladstone
- Gladstone Gander, a Disney comic book character
- Helen Jane Gladstone (1814–1880), writer, religious convert and sister of William Ewart Gladstone
- Henry Gladstone, 1st Baron Gladstone of Hawarden (1852–1935), son of William Ewart Gladstone
- Herbert Gladstone, 1st Viscount Gladstone (1854–1930), cabinet minister and governor-general of South Africa; youngest son of William Ewart Gladstone
- James Gladstone (1887–1971), Canadian senator
- James Gladstone (American football), American football executive
- John Gladstone (disambiguation)
- Lily Gladstone (born 1986), American actress
- Steve Gladstone, American rowing coach
- Sir Thomas Gladstone, 2nd Baronet (1804–1889), British MP, elder brother of William Ewart Gladstone
- Wayne Gladstone, American humorist and author
- William Gladstone (disambiguation)

== See also ==
- Mary Gladstane (born 1830), Irish-American actress in Australia
