= Gladstone baronets =

Baronetcy in the Baronetage of the United Kingdom

Arms of Sir William Gladstone, KG, the seventh Baronet

The Gladstone Baronetcy, of Fasque and Balfour in the County of Kincardine, is a title in the Baronetage of the United Kingdom. It was created on 18 July 1846 for the Scottish businessman slave-owner and politician John Gladstone, father of four-time prime minister William Ewart Gladstone. Born John Gladstones, the son of the merchant Thomas Gladstones, John assumed by royal licence the surname of Gladstone (without the "s" at the end) in 1835. The name Gladstone is geographical, deriving from a farmstead near Biggar in Lanarkshire; it comes from the Old English for "kestrel stone".

John Gladstone was succeeded by his eldest son, the second baronet. He represented several constituencies in the House of Commons and served as Lord Lieutenant of Kincardineshire. His son, the third baronet, was briefly Lord Lieutenant of Kincardineshire in 1926. He never married and was succeeded by his cousin, the fourth baronet. He was the son of John Neilson Gladstone, third son of the first baronet. He had no sons and was succeeded by his cousin, the fifth baronet. He was the son of Reverend Stephen Edward Gladstone, second son of William Ewart Gladstone, fourth son of the first baronet. He never married and was succeeded by his younger brother, the sixth baronet, who did not use the title. As of 2018 the title is held by his grandson, the eight baronet, who succeeded in that year.

Several other members of the Gladstone family have also gained distinction. Robertson Gladstone, second son of the first baronet, was a merchant and politician. John Neilson Gladstone, third son of the first baronet, was a politician. William Ewart Gladstone, fourth son of the first Baronet, was the distinguished statesman who served four times as Prime Minister of the United Kingdom. William Henry Gladstone, Lord Gladstone of Hawarden, and Viscount Gladstone, were all younger sons of William Ewart Gladstone. William Glynne Charles Gladstone, son of William Henry Gladstone, was a politician.

The family seat was Fasque House, near Fettercairn in Kincardineshire. They still own the Fasque estate though they have now sold the House, and are now seated at Hawarden Castle in Wales, which was acquired through the marriage of William Ewart Gladstone to Catherine, the heiress of the Glynne family.

== Gladstone baronets, of Fasque and Balfour (1846) ==
- Sir John Gladstone, 1st Baronet (1764–1851)
- Sir Thomas Gladstone, 2nd Baronet (1804–1889)
- Sir John Robert Gladstone, 3rd Baronet (1852–1926)
- Sir John Evelyn Gladstone, 4th Baronet (1855–1945)
- Sir Albert Charles Gladstone, MBE, 5th Baronet (1886–1967)
- Sir Charles Andrew Gladstone, 6th Baronet (1888–1968). (He proved his claim to the title but did not use it.)
- Sir (Erskine) William Gladstone, KG, 7th Baronet (1925–2018)
- Sir Charles Angus Gladstone, 8th Baronet (born 1964)

The heir apparent is his son Jack William Gladstone (born 1989).

== Line of succession ==
- Sir John Gladstone, 1st Bt. (1764–1851)
  - Sir Thomas Gladstone 2nd Bt. (1804–1889)
    - Sir John Gladstone, 3rd Bt. (1852–1926)
  - Robertson Gladstone (1805–1875)
    - John Gladstone (1838–1852)
    - Arthur Gladstone (1841–1896)
    - Hugh Gladstone (1843–1874)
    - Robertson Gladstone (1844–1893)
    - Walter Gladstone (1846–1919)
    - Richard Gladstone (1849–1909)
  - John Neilson Gladstone (1805–1875)
    - Sir John Gladstone, 4th Bt. (1855–1945)
  - William Ewart Gladstone (1809–1898)
    - William Henry Gladstone (1840–1891)
      - Will Gladstone (1885–1915)
    - Stephen Gladstone (1844–1920)
      - Sir Albert Gladstone 5th Bt. (1886–1967)
      - Sir Charles Gladstone 6th Bt. (1888–1968)
        - Sir William Gladstone, 7th Bt. (1925–2018)
          - Sir Charles Gladstone, 8th Bt. (b. 1964)
            - (1) Jack Gladstone (b. 1989)
            - (2) Felix Gladstone (b. 2000)
          - (3) Robert Gladstone (b. 1968)
            - (4) Tom Gladstone (b. 2000)
        - Peter Gladstone (1928–2000)
          - (5) Tom Gladstone (b. 1973)
          - (6) Allan Gladstone (b. 1978)
        - (7) James Gladstone (b. 1941)
          - (8) Elwyn Gladstone (b. 1974)
            - (9) Elwyn Gladstone (b. 2009)
        - Andrew Gladstone (1945–1995)
      - Stephen Gladstone (1891–1965)
        - Stephen Gladstone (1924–2006)
          - Stephen Gladstone (1955–1989)
        - (10) John Gladstone (b. 1932)
          - (11) David Gladstone (b. 1960)
          - (12) Peter Gladstone (b. 1963)
    - Henry Gladstone, 1st Baron Gladstone of Hawarden (1852–1935)
    - Herbert Gladstone, 1st Viscount Gladstone (1854–1930)
