= John Gladstone =

John Gladstone may refer to:

- Sir John Gladstone, 1st Baronet (1764–1851), British politician, father of British Prime Minister William Ewart Gladstone
- Sir John Gladstone, 3rd Baronet (1852–1926)
- Sir John Gladstone, 4th Baronet (1855–1945)
- John Neilson Gladstone (1807–1863), British politician, brother of British Prime Minister W. E. Gladstone
- John Hall Gladstone (1827–1902), chemist and winner of the Davy Medal in 1897
- John Gladstone (bishop) (born 1945), Anglican bishop in India
