= Fasque House =

Coordinates: 56°52′14″N 2°34′36″W

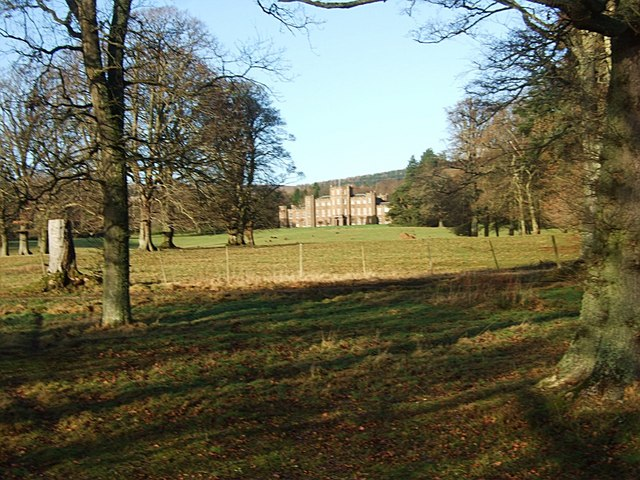
- View from the driveway in 2009
- Interactive map of Fasque House

Inventory of Gardens and Designed Landscapes in Scotland
- Official name: Fasque House
- Designated: 31 March 2006
- Reference no.: GDL00178

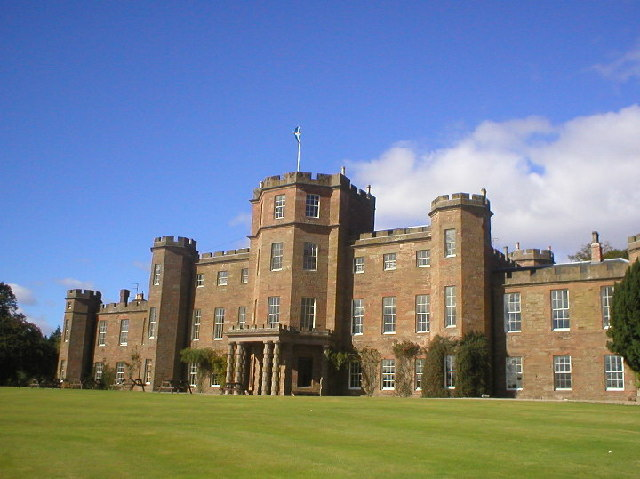
The house in 2003

Fasque, also known as Fasque House or Fasque Castle, is a mansion in Aberdeenshire, Scotland, situated near the village of Fettercairn, in the former county of Kincardineshire.

Fasque was the property of the Ramsays of Balmain, and the present house was completed around 1809, replacing an earlier house. It was purchased in 1829 by Sir John Gladstone, 1st Baronet, father of Thomas Gladstone and William Ewart Gladstone, later Prime Minister of the United Kingdom, who often stayed there. Fasque was a family home of the Gladstones until the 1930s, and was open to the public during the last quarter of the 20th century. In 2010 Fasque House was bought by Fasque House Properties Ltd and restoration work was begun.

== Etymology ==
The name comes from the Gaelic word fasgadh, meaning "safety", or "dwelling place", and for reasons of potential tautology, "house" was never officially added. The name is a baroque, eighteenth-century corruption of the original Gaelic word.

== History ==
A previous house, known as Fasque, or Faskie, was located roughly 50 yards (50 m) north of the present site. In about the 1750s, Sir Alexander Ramsay, 6th Baronet of Balmain, who had been a local Member of Parliament, planted the beech avenues that survive today. William Adam (1689–1748) prepared a plan for the house which is illustrated in his Vitruvius Scoticus, although it was never executed. By 1790, the house was increasingly prone to damp, and was demolished only forty years after completion.

Sir Alexander, by then known as Alexander Ramsay-Irvine, died without an heir in 1806, and the estate passed to his nephew, Alexander Burnet, who was made a baronet in 1806, and adopted the Ramsay surname. Although begun by Sir Alexander Ramsay-Irvine, the current house was not completed until about 1809. Approximately £30,000 was spent on the project. The house took over ten years to construct, with contemporary guide books describing its central hallway as open to the elements, as the world's largest indoor double spiral staircase was being constructed at the back of the hall. After his death in May 1810, the younger Alexander's 2nd son, also Alexander Ramsay, inherited the estate and the baronetcy, and kept Fasque for 19 years before having to sell it in the face of rising costs of its upkeep.

=== Fasque under the Gladstones ===
In 1829, the house was sold for £80,000 to John Gladstone, a Scottish merchant from Liverpool whose family (originally called Gledstanes) had been farmers in Biggar, South Lanarkshire, before becoming wine merchants in Leith in the years following 1745. John Gladstone built up a business empire in property and international trade that by the 1820s had made him extremely wealthy. Via his ownership of slave plantations in the West Indies, by the passage of the Slavery Abolition Act in 1833 Gladstone was one of the largest slaveholders in Scotland. He received £106,769 in compensation (equivalent to £14.8 million in 2024) under the Slave Compensation Act 1837 for the 2,508 slaves he owned across nine slave plantations, more than any single other plantation owner.

Following the death of their eldest daughter, Anne, in 1829, it took four years for the Gladstones to move up to the new property, from the now-demolished Seaforth House on the shores of the Mersey. In the winter of 1833, John, his wife Anne McKenzie and their youngest daughter, Helen, moved into Fasque for the first time. Their arrival coincided with one of the worst spells of weather ever recorded in Kincardineshire, with many of the trees to the north of the house (which had been planted originally in 1745) being blown down by high winds. The cold and the damp of the new house had a detrimental effect on Anne McKenzie Gladstone's health, and she died in 1835. Ten years later, in 1845, the Baronetcy of Fasque and Balfour was bestowed upon the elderly Sir John Gladstone, and to commemorate this, he built the Fasque Episcopalian Church in the grounds of the house, which is still used to this day. In its first decade, the Church also saw the burial of one of William Ewart Gladstone's offspring who died in childhood, and in the same year as its founding.

In December 1851, Sir John Gladstone died, passing the house on to his oldest son, Thomas, the eldest brother of William. Thomas's sibling rivalry had been strong over the years, but now, as the second Baronet (and from 1876, Lord Lieutenant of Kincardineshire), Thomas Gladstone and his wife Louisa Fellows, a relative of Queen Victoria, ran Fasque as an effective house for nearly 40 years, adding servants' quarters to the building itself, along with a school in the grounds. During that time, William Ewart Gladstone (who had come into possession of Hawarden Castle in North Wales, through his wife's family, the Glynns) visited his elder brother many times, and practised his hobbies of walking and tree-felling across the moors of the estate. The estate lands had slowly expanded during Thomas's tenure to encompass 80,000 acres (320 km^{2}), bordering Balmoral to the north. Sir Thomas died in 1889, passing the Baronetcy on to his eldest son John, a bachelor soldier, who came home to run the estate with his sister Mary in the 1890s. After Thomas' death, William did not visit his nephew's estate again, and himself died in May 1898.

Fasque House remained a working home until 1932, when Lady Mary, who had survived her brother John by six years, passed on. At this point, Fasque House became disused, with much of the furniture covered with sheets, and rooms locked up for decades. The estate itself operated as before, but the main house was empty, although it remained "immaculately well preserved". Eventually, the Baronetcy passed through various family lines to end up with the 7th Baronet, Sir William Gladstone, great-grandson of the prime minister, and a former Chief Scout. In 1978, Sir William's younger brother, the naturalist Peter Gladstone, redecorated Fasque, apparently whitewashing almost every wall surface himself, and opened it to the public for the first time in September of that year, partly capitalising on the then-current popularity of the TV show Upstairs Downstairs. Fasque House remained open to summer visitors for over two decades, with the house's east wing almost entirely open to the public, and the west wing providing a home for Peter's family. A large auction of items from the house gained much publicity when it was held in the grounds in 1997. Peter died in 2000, with the estate now being run by Charles Gladstone, son of Sir William, the 7th Baronet. In 2003, the house was closed to the public, and since then specially arranged coach parties and wedding services have also been discontinued.

=== Recent developments ===
In August 2007, Fasque House was sold to a local developer who intended to convert the building into flats. However, it was quickly put back on the market, with an asking price of £1.9 million. In May 2009 it was still being marketed, though at the reduced price of £1m. In 2010 Fasque House was bought by Fasque House Properties Ltd, and a complete restoration of the house was begun. The building's use as a wedding venue was reinstated, alongside conference facilities and cottage rentals. This sale did not affect the Fasque and Glen Dye Estate, which is still owned by the Gladstone family.

== Architecture ==
The house is a large sandstone building, in a symmetrical castellated style, with octagonal towers at the centre and corners of the main facade. The structure remains relatively unchanged since its completion. Sir John Gladstone added a third storey to the central tower in 1830, and built the portico of rusticated pillars in the 1840s. The drawing room was expanded in 1905, and some servants' quarters were added before the beginning of the First World War. Innovative use of electricity meant that Fasque was possibly the first house in Scotland to be lit by electric lights, and had an electric buzzer system as early as 1890. It was also noted for having innovative firefighting and health and safety equipment in the 1920s. The house is a category A listed building.

== Current management ==
The property is managed by Inverlochy Castle Management International. ICMI also manages the luxury hotels Cromlix House in Perthshire, Greywalls Hotel & Chez Roux in East Lothian and Inverlochy Castle Hotel in Fort William.
