= Peter Gladstone =

British naturalist (1928-2000)

- Born: 16 October 1928
- Died: 25 June 2000 (aged 71)

Peter Gladstone (16 October 1928 – 25 July 2000) was a British naturalist and wildfowl expert and patent attorney. He was the great-grandson of the Liberal prime minister William Ewart Gladstone, and brother of Sir William Gladstone, 7th Baronet. He grew up at Hawarden Castle in Wales, and attended Eton College, where his father, Charles Gladstone, was a housemaster. He served in the Palestine Police in 1946, towards the end of the British Mandate of Palestine. From 1949 to 1952 he studied biology at Christ Church, Oxford, and rowed for Oxford in the 1952 Boat Race. He went on to teach biology at Shrewsbury School until 1971, when he joined Sir Peter Scott's Wildfowl and Wetlands Trust. Gladstone developed the trust's wildfowl reserve at Martin Mere in Lancashire. In the 1970s he took over the management of Fasque House, a family property in Aberdeenshire. In 1998 he journeyed to Tibet in an unsuccessful search for the pink-headed duck. He was a fellow of the Royal Geographical Society. Gladstone died of a heart attack at the age of 71.
