= Albert Gladstone =

British rower & businessman (1886-1967)

Sir Albert Charles Gladstone Bt MBE DL
- Born: 28 October 1886; Hawarden Castle, Flintshire, Wales
- Died: 2 March 1967 (aged 80); Fordingbridge, Hampshire, England
- Education: Eton College; Christ Church, Oxford
- Parents: Rev. Stephen Edward Gladstone (father); Annie Crosthwaite Wilson (mother)
- Relatives: William Ewart Gladstone (grandfather); Charles Andrew Gladstone (brother); Sir John Evelyn Gladstone (cousin)
- Sports career
Medal record
Men's rowing
Representing Great Britain
Olympic Games
Gold medal – first place	1908 London	Men's eight
- Military career
- Allegiance: United Kingdom
- Branch: British Army
- Service years: 1914-1918
- Rank: Captain
- Unit: 2nd/5th Royal Gurkha Rifles (Frontier Force)
- Conflicts: World War I; Mesopotamian campaign; Gallipoli campaign
- Awards: MBE

Sir Albert Charles Gladstone, 5th Baronet, MBE, DL (28 October 1886 – 2 March 1967) was a British businessman and rower who won a gold medal at the 1908 Summer Olympics.

Gladstone was born at Hawarden Castle, Flintshire, Wales, the eldest son of the Reverend Stephen Edward Gladstone and Annie Crosthwaite Wilson, and the grandson of the former Prime Minister, William Ewart Gladstone. As a twelve-year-old, he attended William Gladstone's state funeral. Gladstone was educated at Eton College and graduated from Christ Church, Oxford, in 1909 with a BA.

During his time at Oxford he was a member of the rowing eight and rowed for Oxford in the Boat Race on four occasions between 1906 and 1909. He was a member of the Christ Church eight that won the Grand Challenge Cup at Henley Royal Regatta in 1908. Four weeks later, he was a crew member of the Leander eight, which won the gold medal for Great Britain rowing at the 1908 Summer Olympics.

Gladstone served in World War I in Mesopotamia and Gallipoli, and was mentioned in dispatches. He was promoted to captain in the 2nd/5th Royal Gurkha Rifles (Frontier Force), in the Indian Army Reserve, and was appointed a Member of the Order of the British Empire (MBE) in 1919.

Gladstone was a successful businessman and held many important positions being a Director of the Bank of England from 1924 to 1947 and a senior partner of Ogilvy, Gillanders & Company, East India merchants and accepting house. He was appointed Lieutenant of the City of London and was High Sheriff of the County of London in 1929. In 1935 he became Constable of Flint Castle and held the post until his death. He succeeded his cousin Sir John Evelyn Gladstone as baronet, on the latter's death on 12 February 1945.

Gladstone died in Fordingbridge, Hampshire aged 80. As he never married and had no issue, the title passed to his younger brother, Charles Andrew Gladstone, who became the 6th Baronet.

== See also ==
- List of Oxford University Boat Race crews
- List of directors of the Bank of England

Honorary titles
Preceded by Hon. Roland Kitson	High Sheriff of the County of London; 1929–1930	Succeeded by Hon. George Charles Colville
Baronetage of the United Kingdom
Preceded by John Gladstone	Baronet (of Fasque); 1945–1967	Succeeded by Charles Gladstone
