= Westmoreland (1800 ship) =

History

Great Britain
- Name: Westmoreland
- Builder: Whitby
- Launched: 1800
- Fate: Abandoned at sea on 22 October 1825

General characteristics
- Tons burthen: 366 (bm)

Westmoreland was launched at Whitby in 1800. She first sailed as a West Indiaman. From 1816 to 1821 and then again from 1823 to 1825 she sailed to India under a license from the British East India Company (EIC). Her crew abandoned her at sea on 22 October 1825. She eventually floated ashore on the coast of France and was salvaged.

== Career ==
Westmoreland first appeared in Lloyd's Register (LR) in 1801.

Year	Master	Owner	Trade	Source & notes
1801	W.Oliver	R.Walker	Liverpool–Jamaica	LR
1805	W.Oliver; J.Brightson	R.Walker	Liverpool–Jamaica	LR
1809	J.Brightson	Fletcher	Liverpool–Madeira	LR
1813	J.Brightson; M'Dowell	Fletcher; Gladstone	Liverpool–Jamaica; Liverpool–Brazil	LR
1814	M'Dowell; E."Wrdrpr"	Gladstone	Liverpool–Brazil	LR; damages repaired 1813

In 1813 the EIC had lost its monopoly on the trade between India and Britain. British ships were then free to sail to India or the Indian Ocean under a license from the EIC. Thereafter, John Gladstone, of Liverpool, purchased Westmoreland and other vessels to trade with India. (Note: Other vessels trading with India in which Gladstone had an ownership interest included: Roscoe, Duke of Lancaster, Seaforth, Theodosia, Richard, and Bencoolen.)

Year	Master	Owner	Trade	Source & notes
1816	E."Wardrpr"; Cummins	Gladstone	Liverpool–Newfoundland; London–Bengal	LR; damages repaired 1813 & large repair 1816
1818	T.Cummins; J.Cririe	Gladstone	London–Bengal; London–Bombay	LR; large repair 1816

Captain T.Cummins sailed for Fort William, India on 31 March 1817 under a license from the EIC. (The year may be a typo as other sources have Westmoreland, Cummins, master, arriving at Liverpool on 9 May 1817, having left Bengal on 14 December 1816.)

Westmoreland, Crew, master, left Liverpool on 18 November 1818, but had to put back on 5 December leaky. A different report had her putting back because of a defective main mast.

Year	Master	Owner	Trade	Source & notes
1821	J.Cririe; W.Smith	Gladstone	London–Bombay	LR; large repair 1816 & repairs 1819
1822	W.Smith; J.Coultin	Gladstone	Bristol–Quebec	LR; large repair 1816, repairs 1817, and large repair 1822
1823	J.Coultin	Gladstone	Liverpool–Calcutta	LR; large repair 1822
1825	W.Coulter	Gladstone	Liverpool–Calcutta	LR; large repair 1822
1826	Worthington	Gladstone	Liverpool–Newfoundland	LR; large repair 1822

== Fate ==
Her crew abandoned Westmoreland, Worthington, master, in the Atlantic Ocean 15 leagues (45 nautical miles (83 km) west of the Isles of Scilly. Charles rescued the crew. Westmoreland was on a voyage from Quebec City to Liverpool. She subsequently drifted ashore on the coast of Finistère, France and was taken in to a port near Brest.
