= Kamarul =

Kamarul is a given name. Notable people with the name include:

- Kamarul Baharin Abbas (born 1947), Malaysian politician and Member of Parliament
- Raja Kamarul Bahrin (born 1955), Malaysian politician and Member of Parliament
- Kamarul Effandi (born 1987), Malaysian professional football player
- Kamarul Ariffin Mohd Yassin (born 1934), Chairman of the World Scout Committee
