= Charles Gladstone =

British Baronet (1888–1968)

Sir Charles Gladstone GCStJ
- Born: Charles Andrew Gladstone; 28 October 1888
- Died: 28 April 1968 (aged 79)
- Education: Eton College; Christ Church, Oxford

High Sheriff of Flintshire
- In office 1951–1951
- Preceded by: Ralph Eldon Owen
- Succeeded by: John Heron Storey
- Military career
- Allegiance: United Kingdom
- Branch: British Army; Royal Flying Corps
- Service years: 1912–1924
- Rank: Lieutenant
- Unit: Territorial Force
- Conflicts: World War I
- Spouse: Isla Margaret Crum (m. 1925–1968)
- Children: 6
- Parents: Rev. Stephen Edward Gladstone (father); Annie Crosthwaite Wilson (mother)
- Relatives: Erskine William Gladstone (son); Peter Gladstone (son); William Ewart Gladstone (grandfather); Albert Gladstone (brother); Sir John Evelyn Gladstone (cousin)

Sir Charles Andrew Gladstone, 6th Baronet (28 October 1888 – 28 April 1968) was a Master at Eton College and a British baronet.

Gladstone was the son of the Reverend Stephen Edward Gladstone and Annie Crosthwaite Wilson, and the grandson of the former Prime Minister, William Ewart Gladstone. As a ten-year-old, he attended William Gladstone's state funeral. He was educated at Eton College and Christ Church, Oxford. He was a Master at Eton College from 1912 to 1946, he was commissioned a second lieutenant in the Territorial Force in 1912, attached to Eton's Officer Training Corps unit. He fought in World War I, and was attached to the Royal Flying Corps from April 1915. On being captured, he became a POW. After the war, he continued to serve with the Eton OTC until 1924 when he resigned his commission and was granted the honorary rank of lieutenant.

Gladstone married Isla Margaret Crum, the daughter of Sir Walter Erskine Crum, on 3 January 1925. They had six children, the oldest of whom was Sir Erskine William Gladstone of Fasque and Balfour, the 7th Baronet. Another son, Peter, was a noted naturalist.

Gladstone became a deputy lieutenant of Hampshire in 1929, and was the Vice-Lieutenant between 1948 and 1968, and was a justice of the peace (JP) for Flintshire. He held the office of High Sheriff of Flintshire in 1951. In 1955 he was appointed a Commander of the Venerable Order of Saint John.

He succeeded to the title of 6th Baronet Gladstone, of Fasque and Balfour on 2 March 1967, following the death of his older brother, Sir Albert Charles Gladstone, the 5th Baronet. Having proved his claim to the baronetcy he did not use the title.

His son inherited the Baronetage under the appellation of Sir William Gladstone, 7th Baronet.

Baronetage of the United Kingdom
Preceded by Albert Gladstone	Baronet (of Fasque); 1967–1968	Succeeded by William Gladstone
