= Theodosia (1782 ship) =

History

Great Britain
- Name: Theodosia
- Builder: Shields
- Launched: 1782
- Fate: Wrecked 1825

General characteristics
- Tons burthen: 385, or 390, or 391, or 500 (bm)
- Armament: 10 × 6-pounder carronades (1815)

Theodosia was built at Shields in 1782. She spent 20 years trading with the Baltic, and then another dozen trading with North America and the Baltic. From 1816 she traded with India, sailing under a license from the British East India Company. She was wrecked while returning from a voyage to India in 1825.

== Career ==
Theodosia first appeared in Lloyd's Register (LR) in 1784 with J.Culingham, master, James Aram, owner, and trade Onega-Hull. Thereafter she traded with the Baltic and Flanders for some two decades.

Year	Master	Owner	Trade	Source & notes
1790	J.Cook; Thomas Rogers	J.Aram; Q.Blackburn	Liverpool–Ostend	LR; damages repaired 1788
1795	T.Motley	Blackburn	Liverpool–Ostend	LR; damages repaired 1788
1800	P.Sinclair	Hern & Co.	London Transport	LR
1805	P.Sinclair	Hern (or J.Heron) & Co.	London–Baltic	LR
1810	W.Prowse; T.Nicholson; R.Smith	Nicholson; Kidson	Liverpool–Halifax	LR; small repairs 1807
1815	R.Smith; J.Unsworth	Dempsey	Liverpool–Petersburg; Liverpool–Philadelphia	LR; almost rebuilt 1811 & repairs 1816

In 1813 the EIC had lost its monopoly on the trade between India and Britain. British ships were then free to sail to India or the Indian Ocean under a license from the EIC. Thereafter, John Gladstone, of Liverpool, purchased Westmoreland and other vessels to trade with India. (Note: Other vessels trading with India in which Gladstone had an ownership interest included: Roscoe, Duke of Lancaster, Seaforth, Richard, Bencoolen, and Westmoreland.)

On 2 February 1816 Theodosia, E. Wardropper, master and J.Gladstone, owner, sailed for Fort William, India under a license from the EIC.

Year	Master	Owner	Trade	Source & notes
1818	Wardropper; Morrison	Gladstone	Liverpool–Bengal	LR; almost rebuilt 1811 and repairs 1816

On 10 May 1819 Theodosia, Morrison, master, had to put back into Bengal. She was on her way to the Mediterranean but three days out of Coringa she had become leaky.

On 16 March 1822 Theodosia, Kidson, master, was off Liverpool. She had left Bengal on 6 September 1821, Madras on 21 October, and the Cape of Good Hope on about 1 January 1819.

Year	Master	Owner	Trade	Source & notes
1820	N.Morrison; W.Kidson	Gladstone	Liverpool–Ceylon	LR; almost rebuilt 1811
1825	W.Kidson	Gladstone	Liverpool–Bombay	LR; large repair 1820 and small repair 1825.

== Fate ==
Theodosia, Kidson, master, from Bengal to London, put back to Saugor on 9 June 1825 being leaky.

Theodosia was wrecked on 14 August 1825 at Pondy on the Coromandel Coast. Her crew were rescued. She was on a voyage from Bengal, India to London.
