= Robertson Gladstone =

English merchant and politician (1805–1875)

Robertson Gladstone JP

Mayor of Liverpool
- In office 1842–1843
- Preceded by: John S. Leigh
- Succeeded by: Thomas Sands

Personal details
- Born: 15 November 1805 Liverpool, Lancashire, England
- Died: 23 September 1875 (aged 69) Court Hey Hall, Lancashire, England
- Spouse(s): Mary Ellen Jones (1836-1865)
- Parents: Sir John Gladstone; Anne MacKenzie Robertson
- Relatives: Thomas Gladstone (brother); John Neilson Gladstone (brother); William Ewart Gladstone (brother); Helen Jane Gladstone (sister); r)
- Education: University of Glasgow
- Occupation: Merchant

Robertson Gladstone, JP (15 November 1805 – 23 September 1875) was an English merchant and politician. He was the second son, and third child of Sir John Gladstone and the brother of William Ewart Gladstone who was Prime Minister of the United Kingdom four times. Robertson was a successful merchant, businessman, property developer and local politician. One of the youngest men elected Mayor of Liverpool, he was religious but increasingly tolerant of nonconformity, emphasised by a move towards semi-socialist politics.

== Early years ==
Robertson, along with his siblings was brought up in Liverpool at the Gladstone home in Rodney Street and then at Seaforth House from 1813. He studied at Eton College along with his older brothers Thomas and John. However, he did not seem to have the motivation to become a politician and his father felt that Eton did not suit him, with its beatings from John Keate the headmaster. John Gladstone decided that Robertson should become a merchant, first as his assistant, and then as partner.

In September 1821, sixteen-year-old Robertson was sent to attend Glasgow College, where his cousin Steuart Gladstone studied before becoming an intelligent merchant-businessman. John Gladstone's sister, Mary, and her husband, Dr John Nimmo, lived in Glasgow, and Robertson boarded there with his aunt and uncle while he studied mathematics, moral philosophy and natural philosophy at the university. He then returned to Liverpool work in the offices of his father's company.

On 28 September 1827 Gladstone travelled with his brother Thomas to spend the winter in Naples. Whilst there they viewed an eruption of Vesuvius. On his return to England he proposed that he should be allowed to visit the family estates in the West Indies, and his father agreed. Leaving on 12 October 1828 he travelled to Demerara, British Guiana, arriving in November and remained for three months until March 1829. Robertson Gladstone made a record of this journey in his Journal of a Voyage & Residence in the Colony of Demerara which is held in the library of the Liverpool Athenaeum. He returned to England via the United States of America where he stopped in at Philadelphia.

In 1830, Gladstone built a home at Cuckoo Lane, Woolton, Liverpool. In 1833 he joined a freemason's lodge in Liverpool. He was the first Mayor of Liverpool under the age of forty, and as he got older his politics moved to the left, as with his youngest brother William. Robertson was a large, slightly depressive man-mountain of 20 stones. He had a large family of children who were all spinsters and bachelors, and his home life was entirely dependent on his wife's talent for housekeeping. Her death in 1865 left him bereft.

== Marriage and family ==
Gladstone became engaged at age 30 to Mary Ellen Jones (d. 23 September 1865), daughter of a notable local banker, Hugh Jones. They married on 28 January 1836 in St George's Church, Liverpool. The marriage caused disagreements within the Gladstone family: the Jones family were unitarians, while the Gladstones were evangelicals of the Church of England. After the marriage a mansion house called Court Hey Hall was built in the same year as their family home.

They had eight children together.

1. John Gladstone (b. 1838 – d. 13 October 1852 at Court Hey)
2. Mary Ellen Gladstone (b. 1840 – d. 17 September 1895)
3. Arthur Robertson Gladstone, Capt (b. 1841 – d. 30 March 1896, late of Court Hey)
4. Hugh Jones Gladstone (b. 1843 – d. 1 September 1874 at Court Hey)
5. Robertson Gladstone (b. 14 September 1844 – d. November 1893 in Liverpool, late of Court Hey)
6. Walter Longueville Gladstone (b. 30 September 1846 – d. 14 May 1919) – donated a unique organ to All Saints Church in Childwall with an inscription to his father, mother and uncle William.
7. Anna Maria Heywood Gladstone (b. 1848 – d. 14 May 1901)
8. Richard Francis Gladstone (b. 24 December 1849 – d. 2 May 1909, late of Court Hey)

None of his sons had issue.

== Political and community activities ==
Active in radical Liverpool politics, he was elected as one of the councilors in Liverpool's Abercromby ward as part of the 1838 Municipal Elections. This was his third attempt at taking the seat, which was reported as a "The scene of a great Tory triumph, however it was achieved." He served as mayor of the city between 1842 and 1843. In 1846 he was one of the 'gentlemen' present during the visit of Prince Albert to the Liverpool Sailors' Home. As a measure of his continued importance he was still a member of seven of the thirteen town council committees in 1859. In 1862 he unsuccessfully supported Charles Mozley as candidate for mayor. In November 1863 he again proposed him for mayor, and with a majority of five Mozley became the first Jewish mayor of Liverpool. He was also a justice of the peace (J.P.) for Lancashire, a trustee of the Liverpool Union Mill and Bread Company and a member of the Health Committee.

== Commercial interests ==
In the fullness of time after his marriage, Robertson obtained a partnership in Heywood's Bank, where his father-in-law was a partner. In August 1845 he was appointed Deputy Chairman of the Grand Junction Railway and was also on the committee of the Birmingham and Oxford Junction Railway. Robertson was part owner in plantations in West Indies and Mauritius, as well as the Trent Valley line, Shrewsbury and Birmingham Railway and several other rail lines.

He was the first President of the Liverpool Financial Reform Association after it was instituted at 6 York Buildings, Dale Street, Liverpool on 20 April 1848., a body which was noted as "the most persistent and single-minded free trade body England had ever known". Robertson inherited his father's Liverpool firm after John Gladstone's death in 1851. His Gladstonian principle of thrift and self-help for financial reform can be neatly summarised in the following notice of 2 February 1852:

OBJECTS.

1. To use all lawful and constitutional means of including the most rigid economy in the expenditure of the Government, consistent with due efficiency in the several departments in the public service.

2. To advocate the adoption of a simple and equitable system of direct taxation, fairly levied upon property and income, in lieu of the present unequal, complicated, and expensively collected duties upon commodities.

Political partisanship is distinctly disowned, the Association being composed of men of all political parties.

ROBERTSON GLADSTONE, President

Gladstone purchased the patronage of St Andrew's Church in Renshaw Street, Liverpool, a church which was built by his father. He was also the owner of 24 Abercromby Square which is now part of the University of Liverpool. Robertson owned many properties in Liverpool's bourgeois merchant district, all of which were sold at auction on his death. Five years after marriage he became more tolerant of religious difference, in contrast to William's High Anglicanism. Perhaps this was partly due to localism in his character, and partly his wife's unitarian background in nonconformity. But in any event it did not impair the success of his commercial ventures. He developed the land north of Seaforth that was used for the new dockyards, while the house itself was allowed go derelict. The deal put together in late 1853 with partner, brother William resumed their old friendship in the city of their birth. The family-minded celebrated the two churches father, John had built, confirming the Gladstones infinite capacity for nostalgia. He lost around £6,000 of his brother William's share of the Seaforth estate.

== Later life and death ==
He died on 23 September 1875 at Court Hey. Much of his extensive property portfolio was sold at a Liverpool auction the following year between 7 and 9 February. This included dozens of homes on Liverpool's most prestigious streets including a row of townhouses in Rodney Street and stables, workshops and homes in Dale Street and Hope Street.

The executors of his estate were his sons Robertson and Arthur. His will was "proved in the Liverpool District Court of Probate. The personalty was sworn under £120,000. A sum of £500 was bequeathed to local charities and schools."

== Bibliography ==
- Births, Deaths, Marriages and Obituaries – Liverpool Mercury, Friday 28 December 1849; Issue 2154.
- Peet, George (2002). A History of Court Hey Park. ISBN 978-0-9544245-0-3.
- The Liverpool Mercury, Newspaper articles, 1800–1900
- Checkland, S. G. (1971). The Gladstones: a family history 1764–1851. Cambridge University Press. ISBN 0-521-07966-7.
- Calkins, W.N. (1960). "A Victorian Free Trade Lobby". The Economic History Review. 13 (1): 90–104. JSTOR 2591408.
