= William Gladstone (disambiguation) =

William Ewart Gladstone (1809–1898) was a British Liberal and earlier conservative politician, and four-time prime minister.

William Gladstone may also refer to:

- William Henry Gladstone (1840–1892), British MP and classical musician, eldest son of William Ewart Gladstone
- Will Gladstone (1885–1915), British MP later killed in the First World War, son of the above
- Sir William Gladstone, 7th Baronet (1925–2018), Chief Scout of the United Kingdom, great-grandson of William Ewart Gladstone
