= Keith Arbuthnott, 15th Viscount of Arbuthnott =

British Army general (1897–1966)

Major-General The Right Honourable The Viscount of Arbuthnott CB CBE DSO MC DL
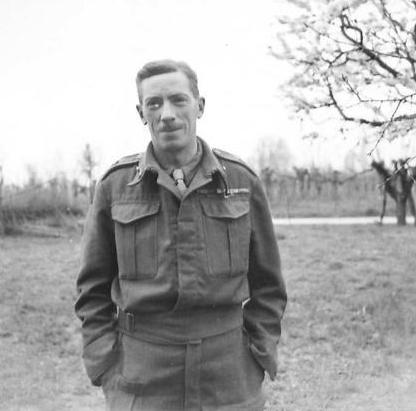
- Arbuthnott in 1945
- Born: 21 August 1897; British India
- Died: 15 December 1966 (aged 69); Hillside, Montrose, Angus, Scotland
- Military career
- Allegiance: United Kingdom
- Branch: British Army
- Service years: 1914–1952
- Rank: Major-General
- Service number: 13522
- Unit: Black Watch
- Commands: 198th Infantry Brigade; 11th Infantry Brigade; 78th Infantry Division; 51st (Highland) Infantry Division
- Conflicts: First World War; Arab revolt in Palestine; Second World War
- Awards: Companion of the Order of the Bath; Commander of the Order of the British Empire; Companion of the Distinguished Service Order; Military Cross; Mentioned in Despatches (3); Legion of Merit (United States)
- Other work: Lord Lieutenant of Kincardineshire

Major-General Robert Keith Arbuthnott, 15th Viscount of Arbuthnott, CB, CBE, DSO, MC, DL (21 August 1897 – 15 December 1966) was a senior British Army officer who served in both the First World War and the Second World War.

== Military career ==
He was educated at Fettes College and the Royal Military College, Sandhurst. He was commissioned as a second lieutenant into the Black Watch on 14 July 1915 and was mentioned in dispatches and wounded in action during the First World War.

After being promoted to captain on 2 January 1924, he attended the Staff College, Camberley from 1931 to 1932, where Brian Horrocks, Sidney Kirkman, Cameron Nicholson and Nevil Brownjohn were among his classmates. After service in Palestine, he became an instructor at the Staff College in 1938 and then became a staff officer at Scottish Command in August 1941 during the Second World War. He then became commander of the 198th Brigade in May 1943, commander of the 11th Infantry Brigade in the Italian campaign in September 1943 and then General Officer Commanding 78th Infantry Division in the Italian campaign in November 1944.

After the war, he became Chief of the British Military Mission to the Egyptian Army in 1946, Chief of staff of Scottish Command in 1948 and General Officer Commanding 51st (Highland) Infantry Division and the Highland District of the Territorial Army in 1949 before retiring from the British Army in 1952 as a major general.

In retirement he was honorary colonel of the Black Watch (Royal Highland Regiment). He served as Deputy Lieutenant (DL), Kincardineshire in 1959 and then as Lord Lieutenant of Kincardineshire from 1960 to 1966.

Coat of Arms of the Viscounts of Arbuthnott.

== Decorations ==
- Companion of the Order of the Bath awarded 5 July 1945 for gallant and distinguished services in Italy.
- Commander of the Order of the British Empire awarded 21 December 1944 for gallant and distinguished services in Italy
- Companion of the Distinguished Service Order awarded 14 October 1938 for services in Palestine
- Military Cross awarded 22 April 1918 for conspicuous gallantry and devotion to duty when in command of a raiding party. He took an active part in the preliminary reconnaissances and training and led his men with great success in the raid, inspiring them by his courage and keenness.
- Mentioned in Despatches 24 May 1918
- Mentioned in Despatches 25 April 1939 Palestine
- Mentioned in Despatches 24 August 1944 for gallant and distinguished services in Italy
- Commander of the Legion of Merit (USA) awarded 2 August 1945 for distinguished services in the cause of the Allies.

== Family ==
Lord Arbuthnott married, 10 January 1924, Ursula Collingwood (died 20 December 1989), daughter of Sir William Collingwood, KBE of Dedham Grove, Colchester, Essex. They had three sons (including John Campbell Arbuthnott, 16th Viscount of Arbuthnott, KT who succeeded him) and one daughter.

== Bibliography ==
- Smart, Nick (2005). Biographical Dictionary of British Generals of the Second World War. Barnesley: Pen & Sword. ISBN 1844150496.

Military offices
Preceded by Donald Butterworth	GOC 78th Infantry Division; 1944–1946	Succeeded by Division disbanded
Preceded by Colin Muir Barber	GOC 51st (Highland) Infantry Division; 1949–1952	Succeeded by James Scott-Elliot
Honorary titles
Preceded by The Viscount of Arbuthnott	Lord Lieutenant of Kincardineshire; 1960–1966	Succeeded by Geoffrey Saunders
Peerage of Scotland
Preceded by John Ogilvy Arbuthnott	Viscount of Arbuthnott; 1960–1966	Succeeded by John Campbell Arbuthnott
