= Michael Ingouville Williams =

Major Michael Ingouville Williams, MBE (born March 1946) was the Lord-Lieutenant of East Lothian, Scotland. He was appointed as a Deputy Lieutenant in 1997 before becoming vice Lord-Lieutenant in 2010. Following the death of his predecessor, Garth Morrison, in May 2013, he was appointed as Lord Lieutenant in February 2014.

== Background ==
He attended Bradfield College in Berkshire before going to RMA Sandhurst in 1964. He was commissioned into the Royal Tank Regiment in 1966 and served in Germany, Northern Ireland and the Middle East. After leaving the army he took up farming in East Lothian in 1986 and received an MBE in 2001 for Services to Agriculture, Conservation and Biodiversity in East Lothian. He is married with three children.

Honorary titles
Preceded by Sir Garth Morrison	Lord Lieutenant of East Lothian; 2014–2021	Incumbent
