= Jock Dalrymple (cricketer) =

English cricketer

Personal information
- Full name: John James Hamilton Dalrymple
- Born: 14 October 1957 (age 69); St John's Wood, London, England
- Batting: Right-handed
- Bowling: Right-arm fast-medium

Domestic team information
- Years: Team
- 1978: Oxford University

Career statistics
Competition	First-class
Matches	3
Runs scored	27
Batting average	13.50
100s/50s	0/0
Top score	15
Balls bowled	486
Wickets	7
Bowling average	37.14
5 wickets in innings	0
10 wickets in match	0
Best bowling	3/34
Catches/stumpings	1/–
- Source: Cricinfo, 21 April 2020

John James Hamilton Dalrymple (born 14 October 1957) is a Scottish former first-class cricketer.

The son of Sir Hew Hamilton-Dalrymple and Lady Anne-Louise Mary Keppel, he was born at St John's Wood in October 1957. He was educated at Ampleforth College, before going up to Queen's College, Oxford. While studying at Oxford, he made three appearances in first-class cricket for Oxford University in 1978, playing against Gloucestershire, Yorkshire and Sussex. He scored 27 runs in his three matches, while with his right-arm fast-medium bowling, he took 7 wickets with best figures of 3 for 34. After graduating from Oxford, he was ordained as a Catholic priest. His brother is the historian William Dalrymple and he is a cousin of Virginia Woolf.
