= Sir Hew Hamilton-Dalrymple, 10th Baronet =

British soldier (1926–2018)

Major Sir Hew Fleetwood Hamilton-Dalrymple, 10th Baronet, GCVO, JP (9 April 1926 – 26 December 2018) was a British soldier and Lord Lieutenant of East Lothian.

== Career ==
Hamilton-Dalrymple was educated at Ampleforth College and joined the Grenadier Guards in 1944 at the age of 18. His final role was Adjutant of the Grenadier Guards before he retired from the army in 1962, with the rank of major. Subsequently, he was Adjutant, later president of the council, and finally Captain-General of the Royal Company of Archers (the Queen's ceremonial bodyguard for Scotland) and Gold Stick for Scotland 1996–2004. He was Lord Lieutenant of East Lothian 1987–2001.

Hamilton-Dalrymple was a landowner whose property included the Bass Rock island bird sanctuary (off East Lothian) which has been in his family since 1706. He was vice-chairman of Scottish and Newcastle Breweries 1983–86 and chairman of Scottish American Investment Company 1985–91.

== Marriage and family ==
In 1954, he married Lady Anne-Louise Mary Keppel (1932–2017), daughter of the 9th Earl of Albemarle. They had four sons, including the writer, historian, critic and broadcaster William Dalrymple, and the cricketer and Catholic priest Jock Dalrymple.

== Sources ==
- DALRYMPLE, Sir Hew (Fleetwood) Hamilton-, Who's Who 2014, A & C Black, 2014; online edn, Oxford University Press, December 2013

Baronetage of Nova Scotia
Preceded by Hew Clifford Hamilton-Dalrymple	Baronet (of Bargeny); 1959–2018	Succeeded by Hew Richard Hamilton-Dalrymple
Honorary titles
Preceded by The 12th Earl of Wemyss	Lord Lieutenant of East Lothian; 1987–2001	Succeeded by Sir William Morrison
