= John Arbuthnott, 14th Viscount of Arbuthnott =

Scottish Viscount

The Right Honourable The Viscount of Arbuthnott
- The Viscount in May 1937

Lord Lieutenant of Kincardineshire
- In office 1926–1960

Scottish representative peer in the House of Lords
- In office 1945–1955

Personal details
- Born: 15 September 1882
- Died: 17 October 1960 (aged 78)
- Spouse: Dorothy Oxley
- Military career
- Allegiance: Great Britain
- Branch: Canadian Army; Welsh Guards
- Rank: Lieutenant

John ("Jack") Ogilvy Arbuthnott, 14th Viscount of Arbuthnott DL (15 September 1882 in Montrose – 17 October 1960), was a Scottish Viscount.

Lord Arbuthnott enlisted in the Calgary Light Horse, a unit of the Canadian Army, in February 1917. He was later a lieutenant in the Welsh Guards.

Lord Arbuthnott represented viscounts at the Coronation of Elizabeth II in 1953.

Lord Arbuthnott served as Lord Lieutenant of Kincardineshire from 1926 to his death, was Convenor of Kincardineshire County Council in 1933, and served ten years in the House of Lords (1945–1955) as a Scottish representative peer.

He married Dorothy Oxley of Ripon.

Honorary titles
Preceded by Sir John Gladstone	Lord Lieutenant of Kincardineshire; 1926–1960	Succeeded by The Viscount of Arbuthnott
Peerage of Scotland
Preceded by Walter Arbuthnott	Viscount of Arbuthnott; 1920–1960	Succeeded by (Robert) Keith Arbuthnott
