= Dwayne Fields =

British television adventure traveller and speaker (born 1982)

Dwayne Fields FRGS
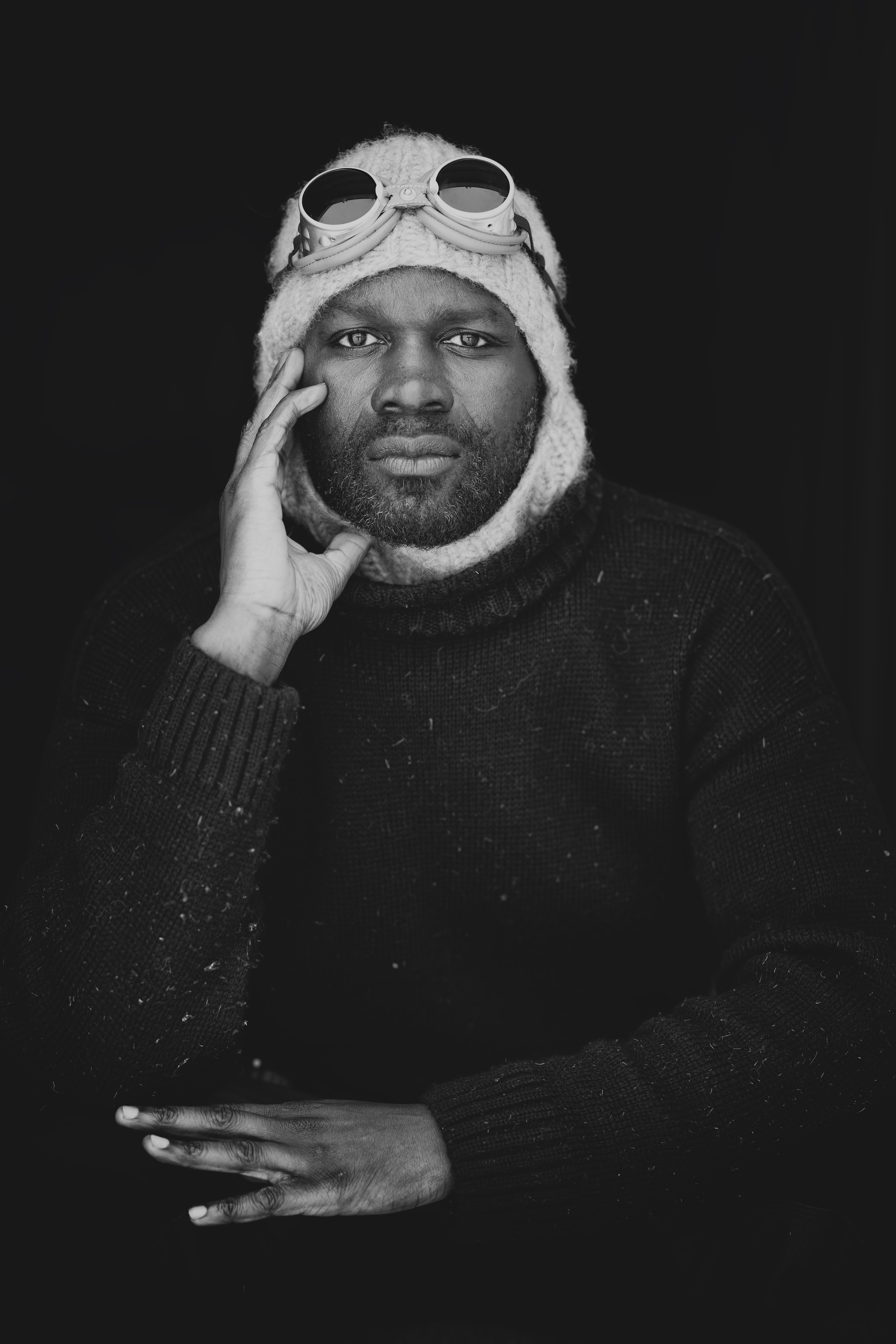
- Fields in 2023
- Born: Jamaica
- Education: University of East London
- Occupations: Television adventure traveller, presenter, and speaker
- Known for: Chief Scout of The Scout Association
- Website: dwayne-fields.com

Dwayne Fields FRGS (born October 1982) is a Jamaican-born British television entertainer, presenter and speaker. He travelled to the Magnetic North Pole. The Scout Association appointed Fields to be its Chief Scout in 2024.

== Early life ==
Fields was born in Jamaica in 1982 and, from the age of six, grew up in Stoke Newington, north London, England. He says that in his early life, he witnessed violent crime. He holds a degree in Psychology and Business Management from University of East London.

== Career ==
Fields says that he was inspired to visit the North Pole after watching a breakfast television article about Ben Fogle and James Cracknell looking for a third member to assist in their expedition of Antarctica. Though he was too late to apply, his enthusiasm for the project was noted and he was asked to recreate the 1908–1909 expedition by Robert Peary and Matthew Henson, which reached what was believed at the time to be the Geographic North Pole.

Fields has appeared as a guest on BBC's Countryfile and Springwatch with Chris Packham. On his Countryfile appearance, he said that he believed that some Black British people do not regard the countryside as "somewhere that's for them" and undertook his North Pole expedition to show that things are not necessarily impossible to achieve. He was one of the participant presenters on the series Welcome to Earth, and is currently presenting his own series, 7 Toughest Days, with National Geographic and Disney+.

He co-founded the WeTwo Foundation, which provides adventure opportunities for underprivileged young people; their inaugural trip to Antarctica was in November 2022. Fields was named an ambassador for The Scout Association in Stratford-upon-Avon, and on 5 September 2024, The Scout Association appointed him to be its Chief Scout.

On 23 July 2024, Fields was made Honorary Colonel and corps ambassador to HM Royal Marines, alongside Olympian Victoria Pendleton.

In 2025, he co-presented a search for the source of the Nile with Ben Fogle on Channel 5.

On 1st March 2026 Dwayne Fields was the guest on the BBC Radio 4 programme Desert Island Discs.

== Awards ==
Fields was awarded the Freedom of the City of London in 2013.

== Personal ==
Dwayne has been married for 16 years and has five children.

The Scout Association
Preceded by Bear Grylls	Chief Scout of the United Kingdom and Overseas Territories; 2024 –	Incumbent
