= Helen Jane Gladstone =

British convert to Roman Catholicism

Helen Gladstone
- Born: 28 June 1814; Liverpool, England, British Empire
- Died: 16 January 1880 (aged 65); Cologne, Prussia, German Empire
- Burial place: Scotland, United Kingdom
- Parent(s): John Gladstone; Anne Robertson
- Relatives: Thomas Gladstone (brother); Robertson Gladstone (brother); John Neilson Gladstone (brother); William Ewart Gladstone (brother)

Helen Jane Gladstone (28 June 1814 –1880) was a 19th-century English convert to Roman Catholicism from Anglicanism.

== Biography ==
Gladstone was born on 28 June 1814 in Liverpool, the youngest of six children of John Gladstone and Anne Robertson. At the age of 14, she began to show signs of compulsive eating and was given electric shock treatment (Galvanism). She later became severely ill, and the family moved to Ems in 1838. It was here that she met Count Leon Sollohub, hailing from a Polish-Russian background. Gladstone initially prepared to convert to the Greek Orthodox Church, but Sollohub's family opposed the marriage, thus preventing it. After a period of reclusiveness, she became a Roman Catholic in a highly publicised conversion in June 1842, sparking outrage from her brother, the politician and future Prime Minister William. Following a stint in Baden-Baden, Gladstone became addicted to opium and was later sent back to Britain. When in Britain, her former acquaintances informed the Commissioners in Lunacy that Gladstone's family were illegally confining her on their property; however, Gladstone's family successfully prevented attempts to have her declared a lunatic and removed from their control.

Endowed with £10,000 by her father, Gladstone travelled between Britain and mainland Europe, eventually becoming affiliated with the Dominican Order as a tertiary and settling in Cologne. She died in the Hotel Disch on Brückenstrasse, Cologne, on 16 January 1880. Her brother William was convinced that Gladstone had renounced the infallibility of the pope and embraced Old Catholicism. Despite being buried in the Gladstone family vault in St Andrew's Chapel, Fasque, Scotland, she was denied the customary commendatory prayer.

== Ancestry ==
Ancestors of Helen Jane Gladstone

Thomas Gladstones
John Gladstone
Helen Neilson
Helen Gladstone
Andrew Robertson
Anne Robertson
