= Wayne Bulpitt =

British scout leader

Wayne Bulpitt CBE
- Born: June 1961 (age 64); United Kingdom
- Occupation: Founder of Active Group
- Spouse: Julie Bulpitt
- Children: Alastair, Francesca
- Website: www.scouts.org.uk/ccblog

Wayne Bulpitt, CBE (born June 1961) was the UK Chief Commissioner for The Scout Association from 2009 until 2016.

== Life ==
Wayne Bulpitt was born in June 1961 and has lived in Guernsey since 1983. In 1988 he married his wife Julie, with whom he has two children.

== Career ==
Bulpitt founded a financial service consulting company, Active Group, in 2001. He is involved with a number of other companies that deal with financial services and investments.

== Scouting ==
In 2009 Bulpitt became the first UK Chief Commissioner of The Scout Association. This was a new role in Scouting after altering the original Chief Scout role to become more focused on the promotion of scouting, leaving the managerial role to the UK Chief Commissioner. Bear Grylls was appointed Chief Scout at the same time Bulpitt was appointed UK Chief Commissioner. At the end of his term, Bulpitt was replaced in the role by Tim Kidd in August 2016.

In March 2014, during Scouting Ireland's National Council in the Sliver Springs Hotel, Cork City, Ireland, Bulpitt was given the highest order given to a Scouter within Scouting Ireland, the Order of CúChulainn.

Bulpitt was appointed Commander of the Order of the British Empire (CBE) in the 2017 Birthday Honours for services to the Scout Association.
