= George Purdy =

Chief Scout of the UK's Scout Association

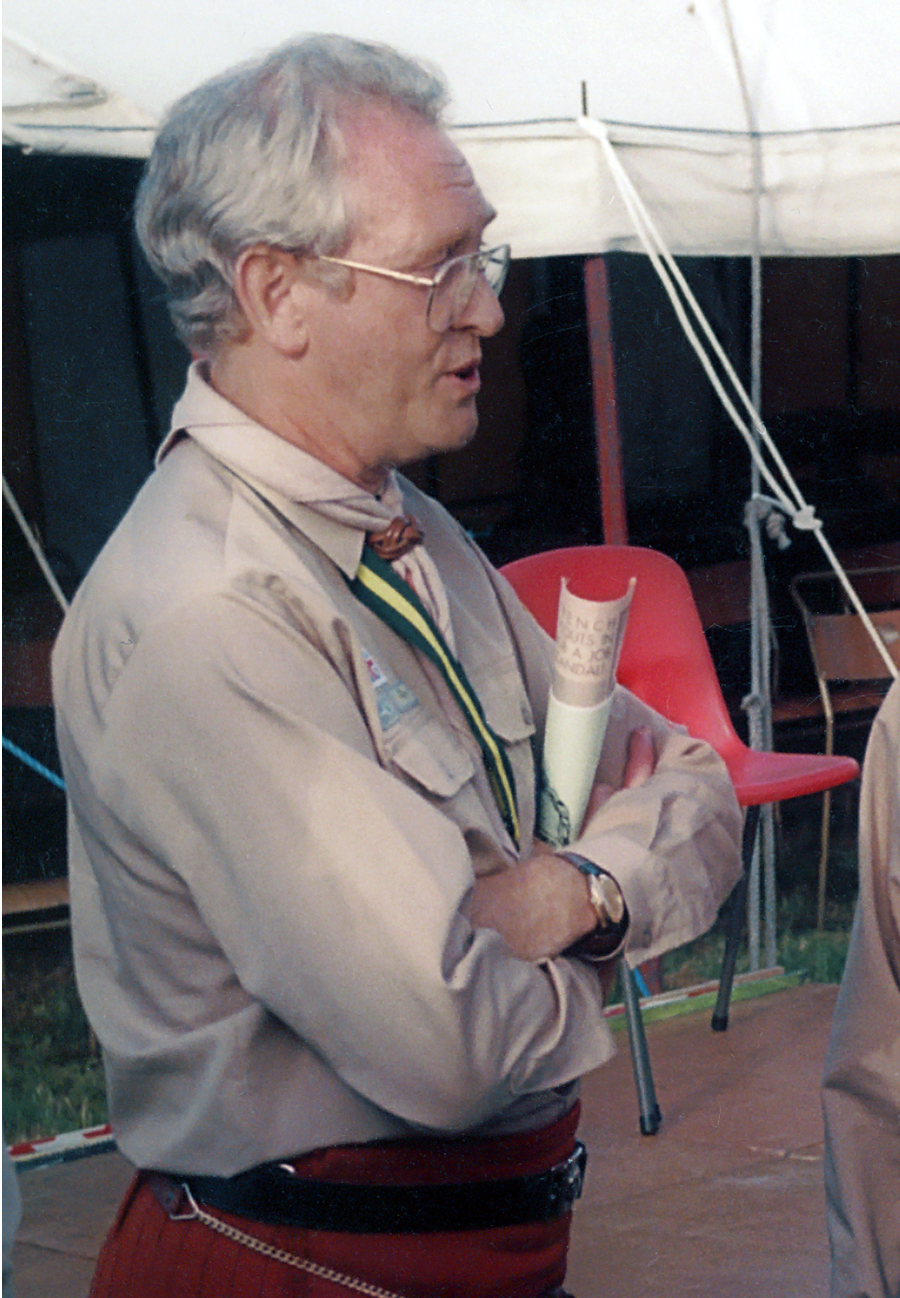
- Born: W. George Purdy; 16 April 1942 (age 84)
- Years active: 1950–2004

W. George Purdy, CBE (born 16 April 1942) was the Scout Association's Chief Scout from March 1996 to 2004. He was made a Commander of the Order of the British Empire "for services to young people" in the 2002 Queen's New Year Honours list.

His participation with the Scout Association started at 8 years old as a Cub Scout. In 1960 he became an Assistant Scout Leader in the 45th West Belfast Scout Group. In 1994, he became the Scout Association's Chief Commissioner of Northern Ireland and its Chief Scout from 1996 to 2004. He was the first Scout Association Chief Scout not to have spent time in the British armed forces.

He joined the Northern Ireland Civil Service in 1960 and retired as Director of Policy and Legislation in the Department of Health and Social Services. He is an Elder of a Presbyterian Church.

The Scout Association
Preceded by Garth Morrison	Chief Scout of the United Kingdom and Overseas Territories; 1996–2004	Succeeded by Peter Duncan
