= John Arbuthnott, 16th Viscount of Arbuthnott =

20th and 21st-century Scottish nobleman and businessman (1924-2012)

The Right Honourable The Viscount of Arbuthnott KT CBE DSC GCStJ FRSGS

14th Lord Lieutenant of Kincardineshire
- In office 1977–1999
- Preceded by: George Saunders
- Succeeded by: John Smart

Lord High Commissioner to the General Assembly of the Church of Scotland
- In office 1986–1987
- Preceded by: The Lord Maclean
- Succeeded by: Sir Iain Tennant

Personal details
- Born: John Campbell Arbuthnott; 26 October 1924 Montrose, Forfarshire, Scotland
- Died: 14 July 2012 (aged 87) Laurencekirk, Kincardineshire, Scotland
- Spouse: Mary Elizabeth Darley Oxley (m. 1949; died 2010)
- Children: 2; including Keith Arbuthnott, 17th Viscount of Arbuthnott
- Parent(s): Keith Arbuthnott, 15th Viscount of Arbuthnott; Ursula Collingwood
- Education: Fettes College
- Alma mater: Gonville and Caius College, Cambridge
- Occupation: Peer, businessman
- Military career
- Allegiance: United Kingdom
- Branch: Royal Navy
- Service years: 1942–1946
- Rank: Sub-lieutenant

John Campbell Arbuthnott, 16th Viscount of Arbuthnott (26 October 1924 – 14 July 2012) was a Scottish peer, Lord Lieutenant of Kincardineshire (1977–99) and a notable businessman.

== Early life ==
Arbuthnott was the son of Major General Robert Keith Arbuthnott, 15th Viscount of Arbuthnott and Ursula Collingwood.

He was educated at Fettes College, Edinburgh and at Gonville and Caius College, Cambridge, where he studied estate management graduating with a BA degree in 1949; and a MA degree in 1967. He held an Honorary LL.D. degree from Aberdeen University (1995).

=== War service ===
During the Second World War, Arbuthnott served in the near and Far East and Pacific theatre (1944–45) with the Fleet Air Arm of the Royal Navy (1942–46), and was awarded the Distinguished Service Cross (DSC) in 1945.

== Career ==
Arbuthnott was a chartered surveyor and a Fellow of the Royal Institution of Chartered Surveyors (FRICS), a Land Agent, a Justice of the Peace (JP) and a Lieutenant in the Royal Naval Volunteer Reserve. He served with the Agricultural Land Service division of the Ministry of Agriculture (1949–55), was Senior Land Agent for Nature Conservancy in Scotland (1955–67), member of the Countryside Commission (Scotland; 1968–71), Chairman of the Red Deer Commission 1969–75, President of the British Association for Shooting and Conservation (1973–92), President of the Scottish Landowners' Federation (1974–79), and a member of the Royal Zoological Society of Scotland (1976–2012), Scottish Agricultural Organisation Society (1980–1983), the RSGS (1983–2012); Federation of Agricultural Co-operatives (UK) Ltd (1983–2012); Deputy Chairman of the Nature Conservancy Council (1980–85); and Chairman of the Advisory Committee for Scotland (1980–85).

Arbuthnott was a director of Aberdeen & Northern Estates (1973–91; chairman, 1986–91), and served as a director of the investment firm Scottish Widows (1978–1994), and was elected as chairman of the society (1984–87). He was a member (1979–85) of the Scottish North investment Trust, and a director of Britoil plc (1988–90), and joined the British Petroleum (BP) Scottish Advisory Board (1990–96). In 1985, Clydesdale Bank appointed Arbuthnott as a main board director, a position that lasted until 1992.

=== Honours and affiliations ===
Arbuthnott was Fellow of the Royal Society of Arts (FRSA) and a Fellow of the Royal Society of Edinburgh (FRSE), Prior of the Scottish Venerable Order of St John (GCStJ) (1983–95), and served as Lord High Commissioner to the General Assembly of the Church of Scotland (May 1986–87), on the Royal Commission on Historic Manuscripts (1987–94), and a member of the Aberdeen University Court (1978–84), and Liveryman of the Worshipful Company of Farmers.

Arbuthnott was appointed a Commander of the Order of the British Empire (CBE) in the 1986 New Year Honours, and made a Knight of the Order of the Thistle (KT) in 1996.

== Personal life and death ==
On 3 September 1949, he married Mary Elizabeth Darley Oxley (d. 2010). Together, they had two children, a son and one daughter.

Lady Arbuthnott died 16 January 2010. Following Arbuthnott's death, a service of thanksgiving for his life was held at St Machar's Cathedral, Aberdeen, on 14 September 2012.

== Links ==
- Bing, Hon Mrs Christy (1999). The Lairds of Arbuthnott. Agnate Press. ISBN 0-9535923-0-8.

Honorary titles
Preceded by Geoffrey Saunders	Lord Lieutenant of Kincardineshire; 1977–1999	Succeeded by John Dalziel Beveridge Smart
Preceded by The Lord Maclean	Lord High Commissioner to the General Assembly of the Church of Scotland; 1986–1987	Succeeded by Sir Iain Tennant
Peerage of Scotland
Preceded by (Robert) Keith Arbuthnott	Viscount of Arbuthnott; 1966–2012	Succeeded by (John) Keith Arbuthnott
