= Court Hey Hall =

Mansion in Merseyside, England

Coordinates: 53.404°N 2.877°W

Court Hey Hall was a mansion in England built for Robertson Gladstone (1805–1875), elder brother of William Gladstone.

The hall was built c. 1836 in the west of what is now Knowsley borough in Merseyside. The architect may have been John Cunningham, the designer of Liverpool Lime Street railway station.

The estate stayed in the Gladstone family until the death of one of his sons in 1919, then was purchased in the same year by J. Bibby and Sons, cattle food manufacturers. The hall was used as a sports and social centre for the Bibby employees.

By 1948 the hall was beginning to deteriorate and in 1951 the company sold it and the estate to Huyton-With-Roby Council. The hall was demolished in 1956 and part of the grounds were turned into a public park called Court Hey Park; the remainder of the estate was used for housing development. Between 2001 and 2017 the park was the home of the National Wildflower Centre.

== Sources ==
- In and Around Broad Green, Liverpool. 1991. Edward Barker. ISBN 0-9518463-0-2
