= Edgar Corrie =

Scottish merchant (1748-1819)

Edgar Corrie (1748–1819) was a Scottish merchant in Liverpool, a close associate at the end of the 18th century of John Gladstone.

== Life ==
Corrie was born in Kirkcudbright. He was the son of William Corrie of Redbank (1720–1777) and his wife Margaret Edgar, daughter of Thomas Edgar of Reidbank who was Provost of Dumfries in 1730.

When young, Corrie served a commercial apprenticeship in Liverpool, and by 1775 had established himself there. In the 1780s he was involved with brewing, and was senior partner in a firm of corn factors. He also acted as agent for James Stothert of Cargen who owned a sugar plantation in Jamaica.

In 1786 John Gladstone took the decision to move south from Leith to join Corrie, who was interested in challenging Thomas Booth for the Liverpool corn trade. By 1790, Corrie as senior partner in Corrie, Gladstone & Bradshaw, merchants and corn factors, decided to purchase American corn on a large scale, with Claude Scott & Co. of London. He also became a cotton broker, in the first half of the 1790s. In 1793–4 he acted as agent for John Tailyour (Taylor) of Kirktonhill, a slave trader and personal friend, in the credit squeeze affecting slave cargoes, obtaining consignment of Liverpool ships to Tailyour's business.

By the end of the agreed arrangement of 14 years, the third partner Jackson Bradshaw had died, Corrie and Gladstone were no longer on good terms, and Gladstone left to set up another partnership.

The family business then became Edgar Corrie & Co., from 1805 Edgar Corrie & Son. From 1807 to 1813 it was Corrie, Ainslie & Co., after which it was dissolved.

== Works ==
- Considerations on the Corn Laws (1791). Corrie, involved in the Liverpool Chamber of Commerce, generated a substantial correspondence in the period 1790–2, when he may have been its president. He attacked the protectionist views of John Baker Holroyd, 1st Earl of Sheffield, and the involvement of magistrates in local corn law enforcement.
- Letters on the Subject of the Scotch Distillery Laws (1796)
- A Second Letter on the subject of the Duties on Coffee (1807), Letters on the Subject of the Duties on Coffee (London, 2nd edition 1808). These works collected letters written by Corrie in the period 1803 to 1808, to Henry Addington and Spencer Perceval as Chancellors of the Exchequer, arguing for a reduction of import duty on coffee, and for encouragement of its drinking and cultivation.
- Letters on the Subject of the Duties on Beer, Malt, and Spirits (1813)

== Views ==
Corrie wrote an extended letter (in fact two enclosures) on the Atlantic slave trade in 1788 to Lord Hawkesbury, asking that his anonymity be respected, with disclosure of his name only to William Pitt the younger. In it he argued for his privately held abolitionist views, stating that the trade based in Liverpool should be shut down. He made the case for conventional commerce in African products based on appropriate investment, and commented on the risk and returns of the "African trade". He also provided a seller's analysis of the Atlantic trade, with emphasis on freedom of choice of markets, in the context of available credit instruments.

== Family ==
Corrie married in 1774 Ann Falkner, daughter of Thomas Falkner of Rainhill, Lancashire: they had nine children. Their daughter Bridget married in 1807 Philip Barrington Ainslie, son of Philip Ainslie. Ainslie, using the pseudonym "Philo Scotus", wrote memoirs Reminiscences of a Scottish gentleman commencing in 1787 (1861) that cover his arrival in Liverpool, with an introduction from Charles Stirling.

Their sons included:

- William Corrie (1782–1831), married in 1809 Rebekah Byrom, daughter of Ashton Byrom of Moor Hall. Their sons included William Byrom Corrie, and Edgar Corrie (1815–1887), who married Helen Brandreth in 1843, and was father of Edward Corrie.
- Edgar Corrie jun. (c.1788–1862), later of Arlington Manor, Newbury, Berkshire. He married in 1811 Margaret Byrom, sister of Rebekah.
