= Garth Morrison =

British head scout (1943–2013)

Sir Garth Morrison KT CBE DL

Lord Lieutenant of East Lothian
- In office 30 July 2001 – 24 May 2013
- Preceded by: Sir Hew Hamilton-Dalrymple
- Succeeded by: Michael Ingouville Williams

The Scout Association's Chief Scout
- In office 1988–1996
- Preceded by: Michael J. H. Walsh
- Succeeded by: George Purdy

Sir William Garth Morrison (8 April 1943 – 24 May 2013) was the Scout Association's Chief Scout from 1988 to 1996 and a member of the World Scout Committee from 1992 to 2002.

Morrison attended Pangbourne College where he was Chief Cadet (i.e. head boy) and Captain of the English Schools Rugby Football Union (15 group). He continued his education at the Britannia Royal Naval College in Dartmouth where he was awarded the Queen's Telescope and Pembroke College, Cambridge, where he graduated in 1966 with a Bachelor of Arts. He spent twelve years in the Royal Navy, as an engineer officer, leaving in 1973 with the rank of Lieutenant. He subsequently took over the running the 560-acre (2.3 km^{2}) family farm in West Fenton, East Lothian, Scotland which provided grains for brewers and distillers in Scotland.

The Scout Association appointed Morrison as its area commissioner for East Lothian in 1973 and was then appointed as its chief commissioner for Scotland in 1981. He attended the 15th World Scout Jamboree in Canada. The Scout Association awarded him its Silver Wolf Award. After being the Scout Association's deputy leader of its contingent to the 16th World Scout Jamboree in Australia in 1987, the Scout Association appointed him as its Chief Scout in 1988. a position he held for eight years. During his tenure, girls were admitted to the Scout Association's programs and its rules and uniforms were relaxed. In 2008, the World Scout Committee awarded Morrison its Bronze Wolf, its only distinction, for exceptional services to world Scouting.

== Other achievements and awards ==
- Commander of the Order of the British Empire (CBE), for services to Scouting, 1994 New Year Honours.
- Order of the Thistle, 30 November 2007.
- Membership of the Society of High Constables and Guard of Honour at the Palace of Holyroodhouse
- Membership of the Lothian and Borders Committee of the Royal Jubilee and Prince's Trust
- Trustee of the Lamp of Lothian Collegiate Trust
- Appointment as deputy lieutenant of East Lothian in 1984
- Appointment as Lord Lieutenant of East Lothian in 2001

Honorary titles
Preceded by Sir Hew Hamilton-Dalrymple	Lord Lieutenant of East Lothian; 2001–2013	Succeeded by Michael Ingouville Williams
The Scout Association
Preceded by Michael J. H. Walsh	Chief Scout of the United Kingdom and Overseas Territories; 1988–1996	Succeeded by George Purdy
