= Seaforth House =

Former building in Merseyside, England

Coordinates: 53.464°N 3.009°W

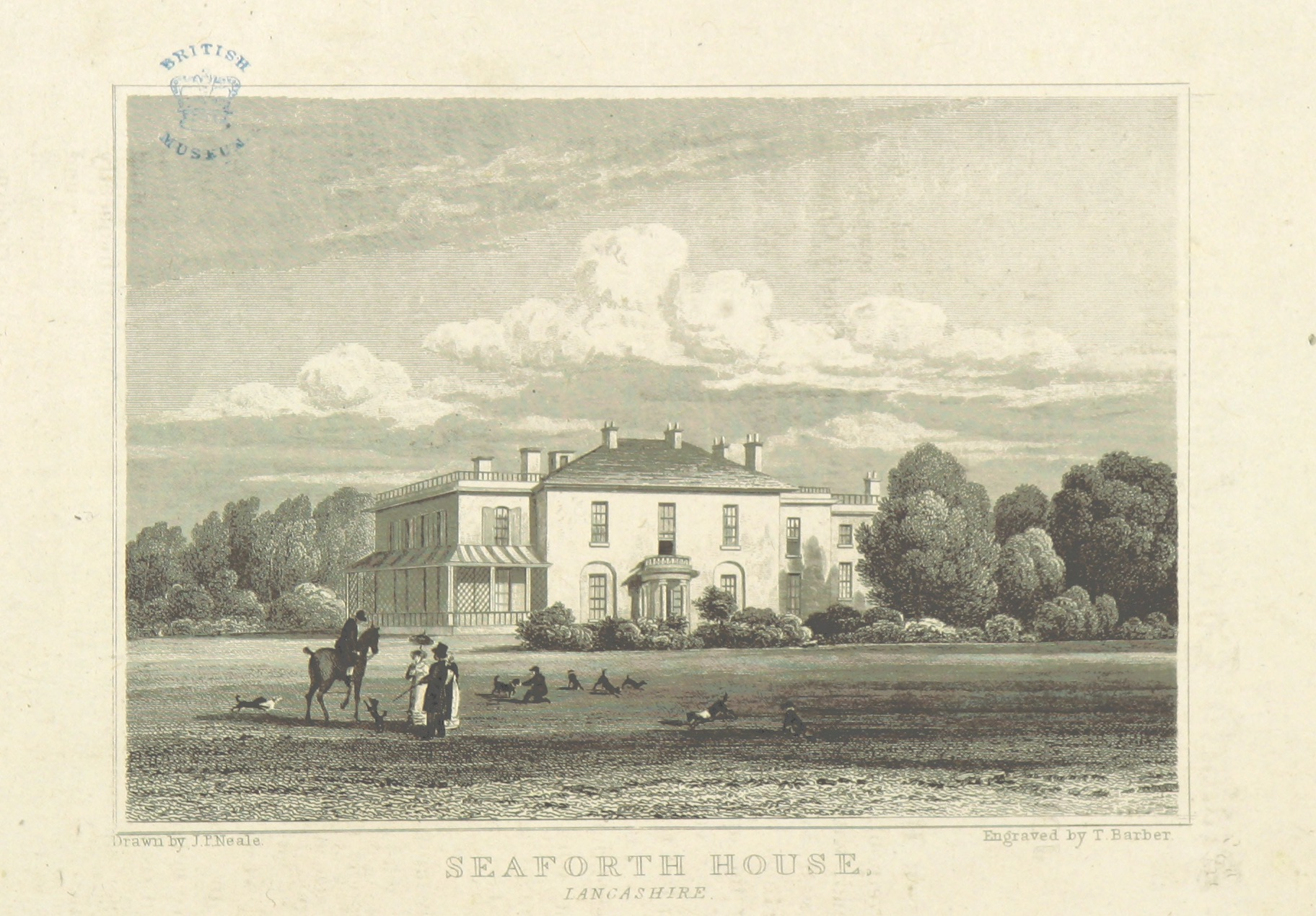
Seaforth House in 1818

Seaforth House was a mansion in Seaforth, Merseyside, England, built in 1813 for Sir John Gladstone, father of William Ewart Gladstone who was Prime Minister of the United Kingdom four times.

Sir John had lived on Rodney Street, Liverpool, and decided that he wanted to move his young family away from the city centre. The mansion was built on 100 acres (0.40 km^{2}) of Litherland marsh, four miles (6 km) north-northwest of Liverpool. The name Seaforth was taken by Gladstone from the title of Lord Seaforth, the head of the MacKenzie family, to which his second wife's mother belonged. Gladstone also built two cottages for his wife's sisters on the land.

The Liverpool Post of 9 April 1913 recorded that the mansion "... was well remembered by many – a long, somewhat low building, having a veranda along the front, facing Elm-road", whilst John Preston Neale observed in his Views of the Seats of Noblemen and Gentlemen "the house is not large, but is particularly commodious in the disposition of the apartments, with a pleasing exterior."

None of the contemporary descriptions of Seaforth describe the interiors. However, Gladstone's daughter Anne refers to the house in a letter to her brother Tom, saying that her father was spending so much on altering the house that it should now be called 'Guttling Hall' (A.M.G. to T.G., 20 October 1817). The letters mention alterations to the library and picture gallery and the building of a major extension.

In 1830 after the Gladstones had left for Fasque in Aberdeenshire, Seaforth was let out to the Paulet family, who were often visited by Jane Carlyle, wife of Thomas Carlyle. The house was demolished in 1881.
