= Michael Walsh (British Army officer) =

Major-General Michael Walsh CB CBE DSO DL
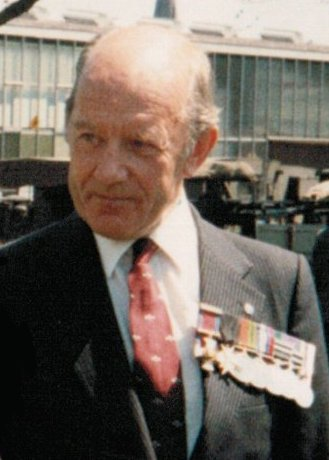
- Walsh in 1987
- Born: 10 June 1927; Harrogate, West Riding of Yorkshire
- Died: 13 October 2015 (aged 88)
- Military career
- Allegiance: United Kingdom
- Branch: British Army
- Service years: 1944–1981
- Rank: Major-General
- Service number: 364588
- Units: King's Royal Rifle Corps; Parachute Regiment
- Commands: 3rd Armoured Division; 28 ANZUK Infantry Brigade; 1st Battalion Parachute Regiment
- Conflicts: Second World War; Suez Crisis; Aden Emergency
- Awards: Companion of the Order of the Bath; Commander of the Order of the British Empire; Distinguished Service Order; Knight of the Venerable Order of Saint John

Major-General Michael John Hatley Walsh, CB, CBE, DSO, DL (10 June 1927 – 13 October 2015) was a British Army officer. He was the Scout Association's Chief Scout from 1982 to 1988.

== Education ==
Walsh was born on 10 June 1927 in Harrogate, West Riding of Yorkshire. He was educated at two independent schools: at Clifton House School in Harrogate, Yorkshire and at Sedbergh School in Cumbria, and was a member of the local Scout Troop. He attained the King's Scout Award with the added distinction of Gold Cords, indicating it as the highest award available in Scouting at the time.

== Military career ==
Walsh joined the King's Royal Rifle Corps as a rifleman in 1944 and was commissioned in 1945. He spent the winter of 1945–46 in northern Italy guarding against incursion by Josip Broz Tito's partisans. After instructing at the Small Arms School and the Jungle Warfare School in Malaya, he was seconded to the 3rd Battalion of the Parachute Regiment (known as "3 Para") and went with it to Cyprus in 1956 as a company commander, where he took part in operations against EOKA insurgents.

In November 1956, the Suez Crisis had come to a head and 3 Para was tasked with capturing El Gamil airfield close to Port Said – part of Operation Musketeer. This was the first and last British operational parachute assault since the Second World War. Despite fierce opposition including tanks, the airfield was captured in 30 minutes. After various staff and training appointments, he returned to the role of company commander with 3 Para to take part in the 1964 campaign in the Radfan Mountains in Saudi Arabia. After promotion to lieutenant colonel, he took command of 1 Para on an emergency tour to Aden in January 1967. The battalion was responsible for "Area North" for seven months and were the last British battalion to withdraw. Walsh was awarded the Distinguished Service Order for various actions in June. The citation reads: "By his outstanding devotion to duty, personal bravery and exceptional powers of command, Lieutenant-Colonel Walsh contained the situation at Sheikh Othman whilst never departing from the principle of minimum force."

Walsh then held staff appointments with British Army of the Rhine (BAOR) and the 28th ANZUK Infantry Brigade in Singapore. He was appointed Assistant Chief of Staff, Intelligence in 1973. Following promotion to major general he took command of 3rd Armoured Division in 1976 and was then appointed Director of Army Training in 1978, retiring in 1981.

== Retirement years ==
Walsh was Knight President of the London-based Society of Knights of the Round Table from 1988 until 1995, the Director of Overseas Relations for St. John Ambulance from 1989 until 1995, and Vice President of the Royal National Lifeboat Institution (RNLI). He died on 13 October 2015.

== Awards ==
- 1968 Distinguished Service Order (DSO)
- 1980 Birthday Honours Companions of the Order of the Bath (CB)
- 1986 Officer of the Order of St John (OStJ)
- 1990 Commander of the Order of St John (CStJ)
- 1993 Knight of the Order of St John (KStJ)
- 1996 Birthday Honours Commander of the Order of the British Empire (CBE)
- Deputy lieutenant of Greater London

Military offices
Preceded by Robin Carnegie	GOC 3rd Armoured Division; 1976–1978	Succeeded by Henry Dalzell-Payne
The Scout Association
Preceded by Sir William Gladstone	Chief Scout of the United Kingdom and Overseas Territories; 1982–1988	Succeeded by Garth Morrison
