= Lord Lieutenant of East Lothian =

Ceremonial officer in East Lothian, Scotland

This is a list of people who have served as Lord Lieutenant of East Lothian, or Haddingtonshire.

- Thomas Hamilton, 6th Earl of Haddington, 1716 – 28 November 1735
- George Hay, 7th Marquess of Tweeddale, 17 March 1794 – 9 August 1804
- Charles Hamilton, 8th Earl of Haddington, 18 September 1804 – 1823
- George Hay, 8th Marquess of Tweeddale, 10 February 1823 – 10 October 1876
- George Baillie-Hamilton-Arden, 11th Earl of Haddington, 14 November 1876 – 11 June 1917
- Hugo Charteris, 11th Earl of Wemyss, 25 January 1918 – 12 July 1937
- Walter George Hepburne-Scott, 9th Lord Polwarth, 17 September 1937 – 1944
- William Hay, 11th Marquess of Tweeddale, 17 August 1944 – 30 March 1967
- David Charteris, 12th Earl of Wemyss, 21 June 1967 – 1987
- Sir Hew Hamilton-Dalrymple, 10th Baronet, 26 January 1987 – 2001
- Sir Garth Morrison, 30 July 2001 – 24 May 2013
- Major Michael Ingouville Williams, 21 February 2014 – 15 March 2021
- Roderick Urquhart, 15 March 2021 – present

== See also ==
- Lord Polwarth
