= Kamarul Ariffin Mohd Yassin =

Malaysian politician

Yang Berbahagia Tan Sri Kamarul Ariffin Mohamed Yassin PSM
- قمرالعارفين محمد ياسين

Chairman of the World Scout Committee

Personal details
- Born: 12 August 1934 (age 91)

Tan Sri Kamarul Ariffin bin Mohamed Yassin (born 12 August 1934) served as the Chairman of the World Scout Committee.

In 1983, he was awarded the 160th Bronze Wolf, the only distinction of the World Organization of the Scout Movement, awarded by the World Scout Committee for exceptional services to world Scouting, at the 25th World Scout Conference. He was also a recipient of the Silver World Award.

== Honour ==
=== Honour of Malaysia ===
- Malaysia
  - Commander of the Order of Loyalty to the Crown of Malaysia (P.S.M.) – Tan Sri (1981)

World Organization of the Scout Movement
Preceded by Sir William Gladstone, 7th Baronet	Chairman, World Scout Committee; 1983–1987	Succeeded by
