= Chief Scout (The Scout Association) =

Chief of The Scout Association

The Scout Association's Chief Scout
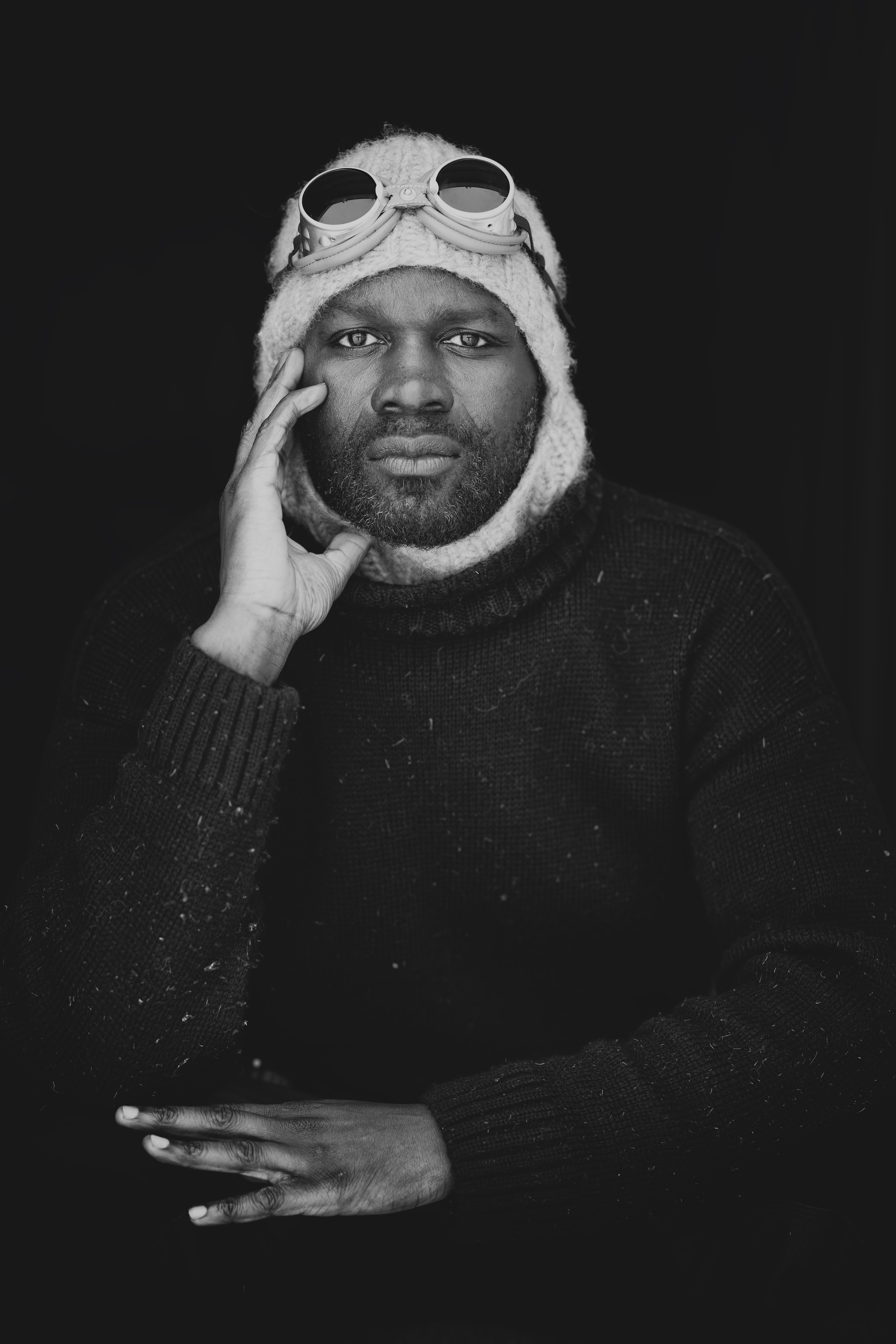
- Incumbent; Dwayne Fields since 5 September 2024
- Appointer: The Scout Association's Council
- Term length: Five years
- Inaugural holder: The Lord Baden-Powell
- Formation: 1910
- Deputy: UK Lead Volunteer
- Website: www.scouts.org.uk

The Scout Association’s Chief Scout is its nominal head of its youth programmes. The association typically appoints a well-known public figure as a role model for young participants in its youth programmes, for a five-year tenure. Since September 2024, The Scout Association’s Chief Scout has been the British adventurer and TV presenter Dwayne Fields.

== History ==
Following the rapid development of the Scout Movement from 1907, Robert Baden-Powell formed his Scout organisation, The Boy Scouts Association in 1910 and made himself its Chief Scout and chairman for life. Following his death, the association appointed its Chief Scouts of the British Empire, then of the British Commonwealth and Empire, then of the Commonwealth and, since 1972, of the United Kingdom and Overseas Territories.

=== Association's Chief Scouts of the British Empire and Commonwealth ===
No.	Name	Portrait	Title	Tenure
1	Robert Baden-Powell, 1st Baron Baden-Powell		The association's Chief Scout of the British Empire	1910 – 8 January 1941
2	Arthur Somers-Cocks, 6th Baron Somers		The association's Chief Scout of the British Empire	March 1942 – April 1945
3	Thomas Corbett, 2nd Baron Rowallan		The association's Chief Scout of the British Commonwealth and Empire	April 1945 – September 1959
4	Sir Charles Maclean, later Lord Maclean		The association's Chief Scout of the United Kingdom and Commonwealth	September 1959 – September 1971 (continued as the association's Commonwealth Chief Scout until August 1975)

=== Association's Chief Scouts of the United Kingdom and overseas territories ===
No.	Name	Portrait	Tenure
1	Sir William Gladstone		July 1972 – February 1982
2	Major-General Michael J. H. Walsh		February 1982 – May 1988
3	Sir Garth Morrison		May 1988 – March 1996
4	George Purdy		March 1996 – 5 September 2004
5	Peter Duncan		5 September 2004 – 11 July 2009
6	Bear Grylls		11 July 2009 – 5 September 2024
7	Dwayne Fields		5 September 2024 – present

== Appointment ==
The association's first Chief Scout, Robert Baden-Powell, made himself the Chief Scout and chairman for life. The association's charter and by-laws made no provision for his removal, retirement or the appointment of a successor in either role. The association's subsequent Chief Scouts have been appointed by its council, which elects its own members including office bearers, while others are appointed by the board of trustees (formerly committee of the council), with others nominated as representatives from councils around the United Kingdom (the majority of whose members are appointed by the board or headquarters) and overseas branches controlled by headquarters.

== Changed role ==
Once the powerful leader of the association, the role of the association's Chief Scout was fundamentally diminished when the holder ceased to also be chairman of the Committee of the Council (now Board of Trustees), following Baden-Powell's death in 1941. Baden-Powell had made himself Chief Scout and chairman for life but, upon his death, the committee determined that it had the power to appoint subsequent Chief Scouts and chairmen. Not only were the roles separated but the committee assumed power over the roles. The role was further diminished with appointments of Chief Scouts for limited terms and diminished further still in 2009 with the functions split with the appointment of a UK chief commissioner (deputy chief scout). The UK chief commissioner (later called UK chief volunteer) took over most of the administrative duties and now heads the adult leaders and administrators of the association.

Reducing the capacity of the Chief Scout to make decisions on their own, a committee was appointed to work alongside them. Working alongside the association Chief Scout's Committee, the association's Chief Scout is nominally responsible for the appointment of County Commissioners and County Presidents, but this is merely ceremonially formal. The Scout Association's Chief Scout is no longer a voting member of its Board of Trustees. The association's Chief Scout is now merely an iconic figurehead for publicity promotion of the association's youth programmes.

=== Deputy chief scouts, otherwise UK Chief Commissioners; later UK Chief Volunteers ===
No.	Name	Portrait	Tenure
1	Wayne Bulpitt CBE		May 2009 – August 2016
2	Tim Kidd OBE		August 2016 – September 2021
3	Carl Hankinson title changed to UK Chief Volunteer		September 2021 –

== Awards ==
Each section of The Scout Association has an award nominally given on behalf of the association's Chief Scout; in Squirrels, the award is the Chief Scout's Acorn Award, in Beavers, the award is the Chief Scout's Bronze Award, in Cubs it is the Chief Scout's Silver Award, in Scouts it is the Chief Scout's Gold Award and in Explorers, the Chief Scout's Platinum and Diamond Awards. The only award higher than this is the King's Scout Award.

== See also ==
- Silver Wolf Award
- Chief Scout (Scouting Ireland)
