= Thomas Gladstone =

British politician (1804–1889)

Sir Thomas Gladstone Bt
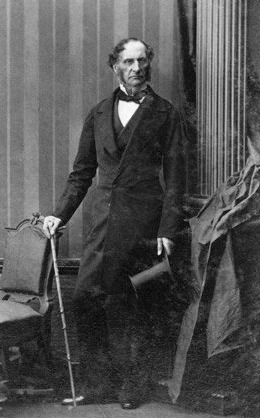

Member of Parliament for Ipswich
- In office June 1842 – August 1842
- Preceded by: George Rennie
- Succeeded by: Sackville Walter Lane-Fox

Member of Parliament for Leicester
- In office 1835–1837
- Preceded by: William Evans
- Succeeded by: Sir John Easthope

Member of Parliament for Portarlington
- In office 1832–1835
- Preceded by: Sir William Rae
- Succeeded by: George Dawson-Damer

Member of Parliament for Queenborough
- In office December 1830 – 1831
- Preceded by: Philip Charles Durham
- Succeeded by: Sir John Colquhoun Grant

Personal details
- Born: 25 July 1804 Liverpool, Lancashire, England
- Died: 20 March 1889 (aged 84) Fasque House, Kincardineshire, Scotland
- Resting place: St Andrew's Chapel, Kincardineshire, Scotland
- Party: Tory / Conservative
- Spouse: Louisa Fellows (m. 1835–1889)
- Children: Sir John Gladstone, 3rd Baronet
- Parents: Sir John Gladstone; Anne MacKenzie Robertson
- Relatives: Robertson Gladstone (brother); John Neilson Gladstone (brother); William Ewart Gladstone (brother); Helen Jane Gladstone (sister)
- Education: Eton College
- Alma mater: Christ Church, Oxford
- Profession: Politician and landowner

Sir Thomas Gladstone, 2nd Baronet (25 July 1804 – 20 March 1889) was a Tory politician from Liverpool, who returned to the ancestral seat in the Highlands to become a country squire. Less well known than his brother William, Tom, as he was known, was both a principled and honest man who supplied his brother with good advice. Their contrasting characters informed rising social and economic liberalism during the Victorian period. Tom was parsimonious, even mean, while his brother was constantly battling family debts.

== Life ==
The elder brother of the Liberal Prime Minister William Ewart Gladstone, he was born in Liverpool, the eldest son (and second child) of the wealthy Scottish businessman Sir John Gladstone, 1st Baronet and his second wife Anne MacKenzie Robertson. He was educated at Eton College from 1817. Tom hated Eton, its discipline harsh and irreligious. Disliking the narrow curriculum of classics, he could not translate Latin very well. He found the Dame impossible and the Headmaster had a reputation for flogging, so he asked his father, Sir John, if he could leave the school. His father refused, and this led to yet another beating. He was still there when a younger brother, William arrived in 1821. The next year Tom went up to Christ Church, Oxford.

Unelected as Member of Parliament (MP) for Queenborough from 1830 to 1831, he actually lost the poll, but recovered the seat by submission of petition. He remained unabashedly Tory all his life, uncomfortable in the changing politics of the radical 1830s. Gladstone was elected by a majority of the 150 voters for Portarlington in the Irish midlands in 1832, but got on bad terms with the locals. They refused to have him back for the 1835 election by which time the Whig Lord Melbourne was in government.

On 7 February 1833 he and his brother lodged at Jermyn Street before they walked down to Westminster, where Tom introduced William to the Commons for the first time. Tom aged 27 was already a member, and a month later found new lodgings at Devonshire House. 160 Tories sat in the reform parliament on the opposition benches, and Tom Gladstone delivered his maiden speech on 21 February. It has been described as a "dim debut" by one historian. He defended his father's credentials and inherited values, in a speech that was mostly an inaudible defence of Liverpool's corrupt local electoral practices.

Having rejected nomination for both Nottingham and Orkney, he chose the town of Leicester from 1835 to 1837, when the death of William IV necessitated a general election. Gladstone's focus of attention fell upon the cost of duty on spirits and fire insurances; he presented petitions to have these taxes lifted. He contested Peterborough in the 1841 general election but lost. Later that year, he stood for and won a by-election at Walsall. His opponents complained and a petition was entered for corrupt practices, for which he was unseated. After another by-election win, this time at Ipswich, he entered parliament again in 1842 despite a successful challenge to the election and having to win another by-election. On 7 June he debated a whole session of petitions collected in the Commons from the localities, emphasising his expertise in the field. But in the House on 30 July Patrick Stewart MP submitted his own as-yet unproven report that Tom Gladstone was guilty of bribery and electoral malpractice. He sat through July 1842, when he was again defeated in a general election after the fall of the Conservative ministry, which overrode yet another petition against him.

He married, in 1835, Louisa, the daughter of Robert Fellowes, a wealthy Norfolk squire of Shotesham Park. They had six daughters, among them Louise, born Q3, 1837 and twins Constance Elizabeth and Edith Helen, born Q2, 1850; the other three daughters were born Q3, 1847, Q1, 1849 and Q4, 1853, all births were registered in the District of St. George, Hanover Square, London. They also had a son, John Robert, 3rd Baronet, born Q2, 1852.

Tom was rapidly disillusioned with party politics: in contrast to his brother's immediate success in the House of Commons, he diverted his attention to making his estate works. So when William requested assistance for election expenses, he turned him down. Tom was a Low Church Protestant with ascetic Presbyterian principles that abhorred profligacy and waste. For a while William was welcome at the family seat of Fasque, though his politics were in the south of England, a long way from the Highlands. Sir John, their father, was incensed by Tom's ungenerous attitude to his promising sibling; ten years earlier he had resented his interference in being forced to vote for William at the poll. But as head of the family he was on his father's death ultimately responsible, for example for installing his sister, Helen, in a Roman Catholic convent in 1847 at Leamington. A surprising choice perhaps given his own religion, but the Gladstones were anything but a conventional family. When another brother, John Neilson, died in February 1863 he passed responsibility for the funeral over to William. He once complained to Edward Harcourt, brother of then Chancellor of the Exchequer William Harcourt, "Mr Harcourt, you and I have two very tiresome brothers."

When Sir John died in December 1851, Tom inherited Fasque along with the baronetcy, which almost guaranteed financial security for life. Over a period of five years, William moved his entire 5000-volume book collection from his brother's house to Hawarden. They saw increasingly less of one another as they grew older. By the end of his life, Tom would receive a visit once every ten years when they stayed for a few days before moving onto another aristocratic house.

Always somewhat overshadowed by the towering political achievements of his intellectual brother, Thomas was passed over for a peerage, and managed to fail in the inheritance of the Hawarden estate. On 12 January 1880, he arrived in Cologne with his wife, Lady Louisa, to find that his sister Helen was gravely ill; four days later, she died. A county resident of the family seat at Fasque, he was appointed Lord Lieutenant of Kincardineshire from 1876 until his death in 1889.

He died at Fasque on 25 February 1889, and a funeral attended by his famous brother, the former prime minister, was held the following day. Lady Gladstone died at Fasque House, Kincardine on 3 May 1901.

Parliament of the United Kingdom
Preceded by William Holmes; The Lord Downes of Aghanville	Member of Parliament for Queenborough; 1830–1831; With: Sir Philip Durham	Succeeded by John Capel; Sir John Colquhoun Grant
Preceded by Sir William Rae	Member of Parliament for Portarlington; 1832 – 1835	Succeeded by George Dawson-Damer
Preceded by Wynne Ellis; William Evans	Member of Parliament for Leicester; 1835–1837; With: Edward Goulburn	Succeeded by Samuel Duckworth; Sir John Easthope
Preceded by George Rennie; Rigby Wason	Member of Parliament for Ipswich; 1842; With: John Cuffe	Succeeded by John Neilson Gladstone; Sackville Walter Lane-Fox
Honorary titles
Preceded by Sir James Burnett, Bt	Lord Lieutenant of Kincardineshire; 1876–1889	Succeeded by Sir Alexander Baird, Bt
Baronetage of the United Kingdom
Preceded by John Gladstone	Baronet (of Fasque); 1851–1889	Succeeded by John Gladstone
