= Sir William Gladstone, 7th Baronet =

British baronet and scouting leader (1925–2018)

Sir William Gladstone of Fasque and Balfour Bt KG JP DL
- Born: Erskine William Gladstone; 29 October 1925
- Died: 29 March 2018 (aged 92); Countess of Chester Hospital, England
- Residence: Hawarden Castle, Hawarden, Flintshire, Wales
- Spouse: Rosamund Anne Hambro (m. 1962–2018)
- Issue: 3
- Father: Sir Charles Gladstone, 6th Baronet
- Mother: Isla Margaret Crum
- Occupation: Chief Scout
- Arms of Sir William Gladstone

Lord Lieutenant of Clwyd
- In office 1985–2001
- Preceded by: James Ellis Evans
- Succeeded by: Trefor Jones

Sir Erskine William Gladstone of Fasque and Balfour, 7th Baronet (29 October 1925 – 29 March 2018) was an officer in the Royal Navy and teacher. The Scout Association appointed him as its Chief Scout from 1972 to 1982.

Gladstone was the son of Sir Charles Gladstone and Isla Margaret Gladstone (née Crum), and a great-grandson of the former prime minister, William Ewart Gladstone. He was educated at Eton, and joined the Royal Navy Volunteer Reserve in 1943 and saw action in World War II, mainly based on destroyers in the Indian Ocean. Upon leaving the navy (with the rank of lieutenant), he studied at Christ Church, Oxford and received an honours degree in history. He then entered the teaching profession, with positions at Shrewsbury and Eton, and he became head master of Lancing in 1961. He retired from the teaching profession in 1969.

He resided at Hawarden Castle, Hawarden, Flintshire, Wales.

== Family ==
He married Rosamund Anne Hambro on 10 September 1962. They had three children.

Rosamund was daughter of Major Robert Alexander Hambro and Barbara Jessica Hardy Beaton.

== Baronetcy ==
At the death of his father in 1968, he became the 7th Gladstone Baronet. He was made a Knight Companion of the Garter in 1999. He held the office of Justice of the Peace (JP) for Flintshire in 1982. He held the office of Vice-Lord-Lieutenant of Clwyd between 1984 and 1985. He was Lord Lieutenant of Clwyd from 1985 to 2000.

Gladstone became a Boy Scout whilst a student at Eton. He encouraged the Lancing School Scout Group whilst Head Master. The Scout Association appointed him as its Chief Scout, a position he held from 1972 to 1982. During his tenure he took special interest in the development of Scouting in deprived areas, particularly the inner cities and new housing estates. In 1979, the World Organization of the Scout Movement's committee elected him as chairman.

== Death ==
He died on 29 March 2018 at the age of 92, at the Countess of Chester Hospital.

He was succeeded in the baronetcy by his son, Charles Gladstone, 8th Baronet.

== Books ==
- Gladstone: A Bicentenary Portrait (Michael Russell, 2009) ISBN 978-0-85955-317-9
- People in Places (Michael Russell, 2013) ISBN 978-0-85955-325-4
- Family, Friends & Fervours (Michael Russell, 2015) ISBN 978-0-85955-327-8

Honorary titles
Preceded by James Ellis Evans	Lord Lieutenant of Clwyd; 1985–2001	Succeeded by Trefor Jones
Baronetage of the United Kingdom
Preceded by Charles Andrew Gladstone	Baronet (of Fasque); 1968–2018	Succeeded by Charles Gladstone
The Scout Association
Preceded by Lord Maclean	The Scout Association's Chief Scout of the United Kingdom and Overseas Territories; 1972–1982	Succeeded by Michael Walsh
World Organization of the Scout Movement
Preceded by	Chairman, World Scout Committee; 1979–1983	Succeeded by Kamarul Ariffin bin Mohamad Yassin
