= Sir John Gladstone, 3rd Baronet =

British noble & army officer (1852-1926)

Sir John Robert Gladstone 3rd Baronet

Lord Lieutenant of Kincardineshire
- In office 1926–1926
- Preceded by: Sir Thomas Burnett
- Succeeded by: The Viscount of Arbuthnott

Personal details
- Born: 26 April 1852
- Died: 25 June 1926 (aged 74)
- Parents: Thomas Gladstone (father); Louisa Fellowes (mother)
- Relatives: William Ewart Gladstone (uncle); Catherine Glynne (aunt); John Evelyn Gladstone (cousin)
- Education: Eton College
- Alma mater: Christ Church, Oxford
- Military career
- Allegiance: United Kingdom
- Branch: British Army
- Rank: Captain
- Unit: Coldstream Guards

Sir John Robert Gladstone, 3rd Baronet (26 April 1852 – 25 June 1926) was the son of Sir Thomas Gladstone, an older brother of the Liberal Prime Minister William Ewart Gladstone, and Louisa Fellowes.

He attended the state funeral of his uncle, W. E. Gladstone, in 1898. Like his father, Gladstone was Lord Lieutenant of Kincardineshire, and was also a Justice of the Peace (JP) in that county. He was a captain in the 1st Battalion, the Coldstream Guards, and was a brigadier in the Royal Company of Archers. He succeeded his father as baronet on 20 March 1889.

He died on 25 June 1926 aged 74. He never married, so the title passed to his cousin, John Evelyn Gladstone.

Honorary titles
Preceded by Sir Thomas Burnett	Lord Lieutenant of Kincardineshire; 1926	Succeeded by The Viscount of Arbuthnott
Baronetage of the United Kingdom
Preceded by Thomas Gladstone	Baronet (of Fasque); 1889–1926	Succeeded by John Gladstone
