= Sir John Gladstone, 4th Baronet =

British noble (1855-1945)

Sir John Evelyn Gladstone 4th Baronet

Personal details
- Born: 23 November 1855
- Died: 12 February 1945 (aged 89)
- Spouse: Gertrude Theresa Miller
- Parents: John Neilson Gladstone (father); Elizabeth Honoria Bateson (mother)
- Relatives: William Ewart Gladstone (uncle); Catherine Glynne (aunt); John Robert Gladstone (cousin)
- Education: Eton College
- Alma mater: Christ Church, Oxford

Sir John Evelyn Gladstone, 4th Baronet DL JP (23 November 1855 – 12 February 1945) was the 4th Baronet of Fasque and Balfour. He succeeded to the title on 25 June 1926 on the death of his cousin, Sir John Robert Gladstone, the 3rd Baronet.

He was the son of John Neilson Gladstone, an older brother of William Ewart Gladstone, who later became Prime Minister, and Elizabeth Honoria Bateson. He attended William Gladstone's state funeral in 1898. Gladstone was educated at Eton College and Christ Church, Oxford. He was an officer in the Royal Wiltshire Yeomanry Cavalry. He married Gertrude Theresa Miller, the daughter of Sir Charles Hayes Miller, on 3 January 1888.

Gladstone held the office of High Sheriff of Wiltshire in 1897, and was also a Justice of the Peace (JP) for Wiltshire. He was the Deputy Lieutenant of Wiltshire.

On his death aged 89 in 1945 Gladstone had three daughters, so the title passed to his cousin, Albert Charles Gladstone, who became the 5th Baronet.

Baronetage of the United Kingdom
Preceded by John Gladstone	Baronet (of Fasque); 1926–1945	Succeeded by Albert Gladstone
