= Lord Lieutenant of Kincardineshire =

Ceremonial officer in Kincardineshire, Scotland

This is a list of people who have served as the Monarch's Lord Lieutenant in the County of Kincardine.

- Sir James Carnegie, 3rd Baronet April 1746 – 30 April 1765
- Anthony Keith-Falconer, 5th Earl of Kintore 17 March 1794 – 30 August 1804
- John Arbuthnott, 8th Viscount of Arbuthnott 5 October 1804 – 1847
- Sir Thomas Burnett, 8th Baronet 22 April 1847 – 16 February 1849
- James Carnegie, 9th Earl of Southesk 30 March 1849 – 1856
- Francis Alexander Keith-Falconer, 8th Earl of Kintore 28 May 1856 – 1863
- Sir James Burnett, 10th Baronet 30 December 1863 – 17 December 1876
- Sir Thomas Gladstone, 2nd Baronet 7 October 1876 – 20 March 1889
- Sir Alexander Baird, 1st Baronet 24 December 1889 – 1918
- Sir Thomas Burnett, 12th Baronet 25 January 1918 – 1926
- Sir John Gladstone, 3rd Baronet 20 January 1926 – 25 June 1926
- John Ogilvy Arbuthnott, 14th Viscount of Arbuthnott 22 July 1926 – 17 October 1960
- Robert Keith Arbuthnott, 15th Viscount of Arbuthnott 20 December 1960 – 14 December 1966
- George Anderson Murray Saunders 22 March 1967 – 1977
- John Arbuthnott, 16th Viscount of Arbuthnott 8 February 1977 – 1999†
- John Dalziel Beveridge Smart 24 January 2000 – 2007
- Carol Elizabeth Margaret Kinghorn (née Saunders) 11 September 2007 – 30 September 2020
- Alastair C.S. Macphie 1 October 2020 –

†Known as Lord-Lieutenant for the Grampian Region (County of Kincardine) until 1996

== Deputy lieutenants ==
A deputy lieutenant of Kincardineshire is commissioned by the Lord Lieutenant of Kincardineshire. Deputy lieutenants support the work of the lord-lieutenant. There can be several deputy lieutenants at any time, depending on the population of the county. Their appointment does not terminate with the changing of the lord-lieutenant, but they usually retire at age 75.

=== 19th Century ===
- 6 February 1894: Captain Thomas Burnett Ramsay
- 6 February 1894: Alexander Milne Ogston

=== 21st Century ===
- 11 January 2005: Victoria d’Anyers Willis
- 2 May 2012: Colin Richard Champion
- 11 November 2020: Ewan Clark
