= Hawarden Castle (18th century) =

18th-century house in Flintshire, Wales

Coordinates: 53°10′57.71″N 3°1′2.24″W

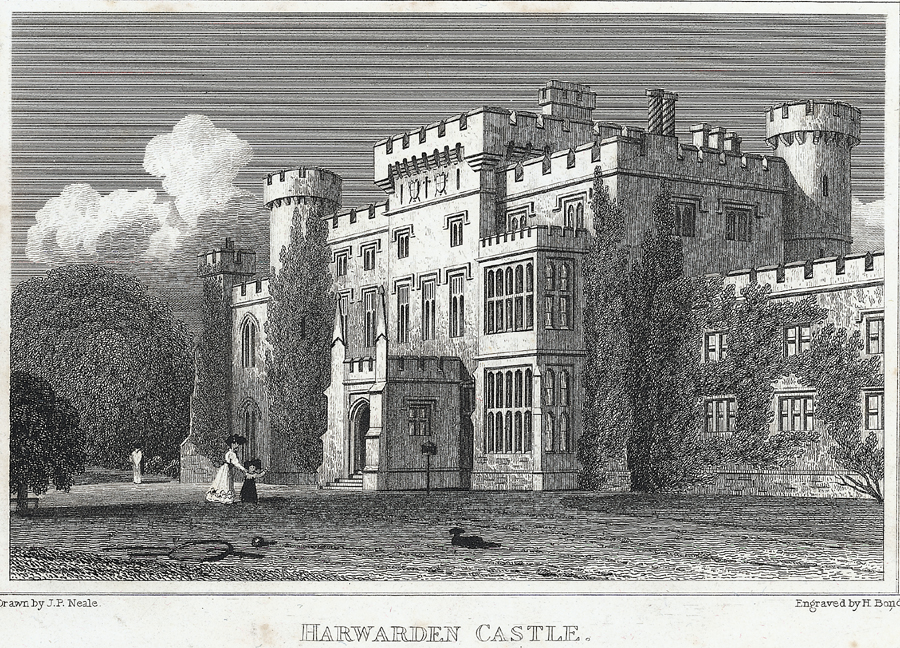
1830 engraving by H. W. Bond, fl. 1827–1849

(New) Hawarden Castle (Welsh: Castell Penarlâg (Newydd)) is a house in Hawarden, Flintshire, Wales. It was the estate of the former British prime minister William Ewart Gladstone, having previously belonged to the family of his wife, Catherine Glynne. Built in the mid-18th century, it was later enlarged and externally remodelled in the Gothic taste.

== History ==
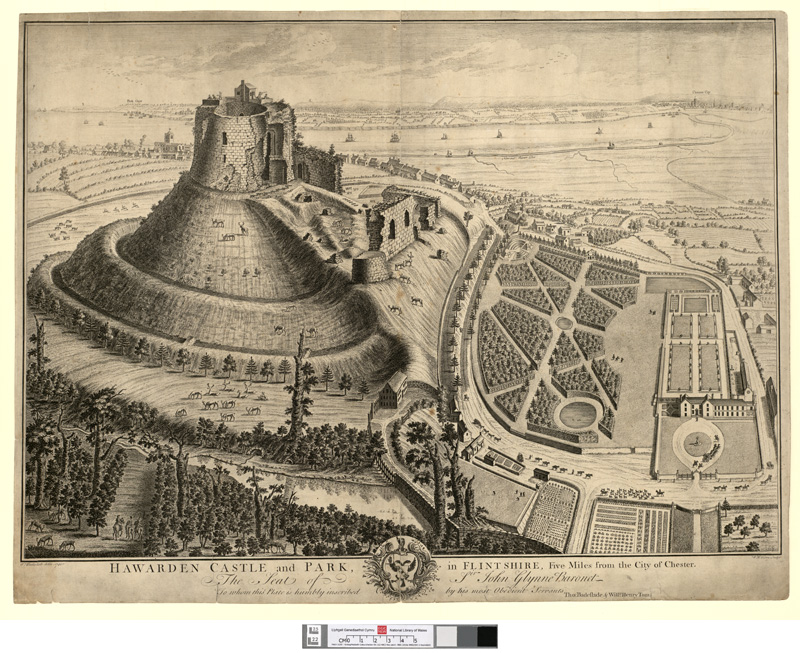
Hawarden Castle and New Hawarden Castle, 1740

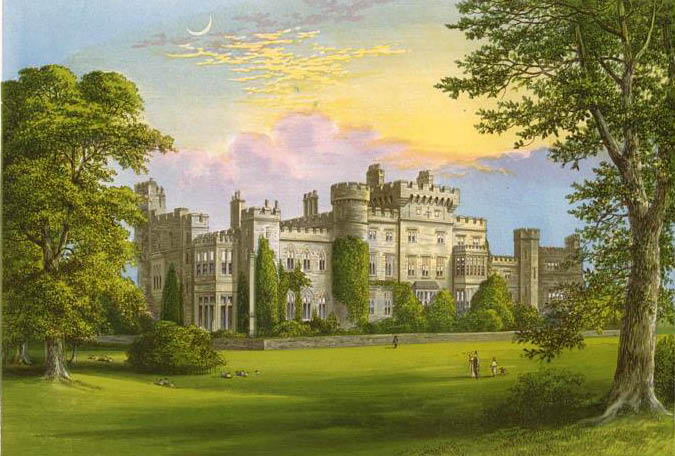
Gladstone's Hawarden Castle circa 1880

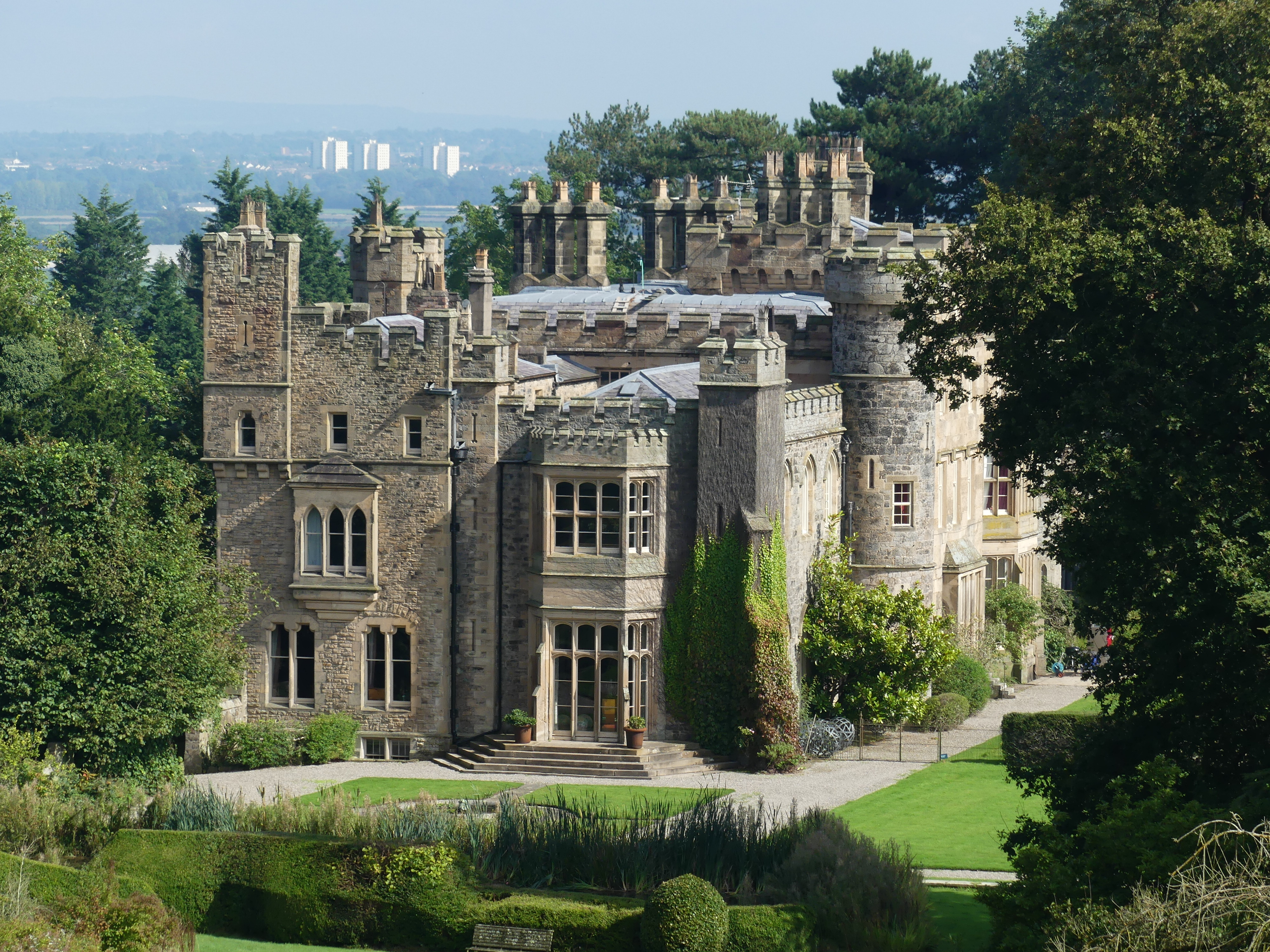
Hawarden Castle from the Old Castle, 2024

The core of the present house is formed by a mansion built in 1752–57 for Sir John Glynne, 6th baronet, to the designs of Samuel Turner the elder of Whitchurch, Shropshire. The current house is very close to the original Hawarden Castle, the current house having replaced the 16th-century Broadlane Hall, the seat of the Ravenscroft family, which stood some way to the south. Glynne had acquired the estate through marriage. The new house was of brick with stone dressings. The main block was three storeys high, and seven bays wide, with a projecting three-bay central pediment. Two flanking side pavilions were planned but may not have been completed.

In the early 19th century, Sir Stephen Richard Glynne, 8th Baronet, inherited the estate. In 1809 to 1810, he had the house enlarged, and the exterior completely remodelled in a crenellated Gothic Revival style, by the London architect Thomas Cundy the elder, although the Georgian interiors were preserved. He died prematurely and Sir Stephen Glynne, the 9th Baronet, was left to make further improvements. He was the Lord Lieutenant of Flintshire, Member of Parliament for the Flint Boroughs from 1832 to 1837, and for the County of Flint from 1837 to 1847. In around 1830, he had the main entrance moved from the south side of the house to the north, and had a vaulted porch added. On the death of the 9th Baronet in June 1874, the estate passed to his brother-in-law, the Liberal politician William Gladstone. There were further alterations to the house during Gladstone's occupancy, including a wing housing a library, designed by George Shaw of Saddleworth, built in the mid-1860s, a muniment room for the storage of his papers (1887–88), and an enlarged porch (1889), these last two both by Douglas and Fordham.

In 1896 the Archbishop of Canterbury, Edward White Benson, died at the castle and his body was put on the train at nearby Sandycroft station to be returned to London.

Also in 1896, Hawarden Castle was host to Qing dynasty reformer Li Hongzhang on his diplomatic mission to Britain.

Gladstone occupied the house until his death there in May 1898, when it passed to his grandson William Glynne Charles Gladstone (son of W. E. Gladstone's eldest son, William Henry Gladstone, who had been High Sheriff of Flintshire for 1888 but had died in 1891). W. G. C. Gladstone was killed in the First World War. The estate was subsequently purchased by his uncle, the 1st Baron Gladstone of Hawarden. The house and estate are still a private residence (although some of the grounds are open to the public) and are still owned by the Gladstone family.

In 1927, Knutsford Ordination Test School relocated to Hawarden — first to the Old Rectory, then to the new castle in 1939 before it closed the following year.

In the grounds of the building lie the ruins of a medieval castle, Hawarden Old Castle. This was built on the site of an Iron Age fort by the Normans and had a round keep built on a motte. Llywelyn ap Gruffudd captured the stronghold in 1265, defeating Robert de Montalt and destroying the castle. De Montalt later reneged on a promise not to rebuild his stronghold and the present massive keep was built. This was besieged in 1281 by Llywelyn's brother, Dafydd. The war of 1282 to 1283 followed; the Welsh were defeated and Hawarden Castle was occupied by the English after that. During the English Civil War it changed hands several times and ended up in a ruinous state in Parliamentary hands.

The house is designated as a Grade I listed building by Cadw because of its architecture, especially the 18th-century interiors, and for its exceptional importance as the home of W. E. Gladstone. The castle's gardens and landscape park are designated Grade I on the Cadw/ICOMOS Register of Parks and Gardens of Special Historic Interest in Wales.

== See also ==
- List of houses and associated buildings by John Douglas
- Fasque House – William Gladstone's father's country house
