= Bencoolen (1818 ship) =

History

United Kingdom
- Name: Bencoolen
- Namesake: British Bencoolen
- Owner: 1818:Jones & Co.; 1832:William Martin; 1839:R. Brown, London
- Builder: Liverpool
- Launched: 1818
- Fate: Broken up 1844

General characteristics
- Tons burthen: 416, or 41653/94 (bm)
- Length: 114 ft 2 in (34.8 m)
- Beam: 26 ft 8 in (8.1 m)
- Propulsion: Sail
- Notes: Three decks

Bencoolen was a merchant ship built at Liverpool, England, in 1818. She made a number of voyages to Australia with cargo and undertook one voyage transporting convicts to New South Wales. She also made one voyage to India for the British East India Company (EIC). She was broken up in 1844.

== Career ==
Bencoolen first appeared in Lloyd's Register in 1819. Her master was J. Anstice, her owner Jones & Co., and her trade was Liverpool — India.

Under the command of Joseph Anstice and surgeon William Evans, she sailed from Cork, Ireland on 24 April 1819, and arrived at Sydney 25 August. She embarked 150 male convicts and had no deaths en route. The guard consisted of detachments of the 46th and 87th Regiments of Foot. In September most of her convicts were transhipped aboard Admiral Cockburn to Tasmania.

Bencoolen departed Port Jackson on 10 October 1819, bound for Calcutta.

On 8 August 1832, Captain William Tullis sailed from the Downs, bound for Bengal under charter to the EIC. She arrived at Calcutta on 27 December. Homeward-bound, she was at Diamond Harbour on 11 February 1833, reached St Helena on 24 April, and arrived at Blackwall on 15 June.

== Fate ==
Bencoolen was last listed in Lloyd's Register in 1843, and was broken up in 1844.
