= William Lewis (MP for Devizes) =

Member of the Parliament of England

William Lewis (1625–1661) was an English landowner and politician who sat in the House of Commons in 1660.

== Biography ==
Lewis was the second son of Sir Edward Lewis, a courtier, and his wife Lady Anne Sackville, daughter of Robert Sackville, 2nd Earl of Dorset and widow of Sir Edward Seymour. His father owned The Van, Glamorgan, and Edington Priory, Wiltshire, and died in 1630. Lewis matriculated at Jesus College, Oxford on 12 October 1638, aged 14. His mother sent her eldest sons abroad during the English Civil War to prevent their uncles, William Seymour, 2nd Duke of Somerset and Edward Sackville, 4th Earl of Dorset, from engaging them in the royalist cause and he travelled in France and Italy between 1642 and 1646. In 1647 he succeeded to the family estates on the death of his elder brother.

Lewis was commissioner for assessment for Oxfordshire from January 1660 and was commissioner of militia for Oxfordshire in March 1660. He was a J.P. from March 1660 until his death. In 1660, he was elected Member of Parliament for Devizes. He was Deputy Lieutenant from August 1660.

Lewis died at the age of about 35.

== Family ==
Lewis married Margaret Banastre, daughter of Lawrence Banastre of Boarstall, Buckinghamshire on 24 June 1649, and had two sons and two daughters. The marriage enabled him to buy an estate at Bletchington in 1656 for £10,000. His son Edward was MP in 1669. His brother Richard was MP for Westbury. His daughter Mary married William Jephson and his daughter Elizabeth married firstly Sir Francis Dayrell and secondly Sir William Morgan. His widow remarried to Charles Stewart, 3rd Duke of Richmond, and died in 1666. Richmond then remarried Frances Stewart ("la Belle Stuart"), much to the displeasure of King Charles II of England, who had hoped to make her his mistress.

== Notes ==
Parliament of England
Preceded by Edward Bayntun; Robert Nicholas	Member of Parliament for Devizes; 1660; With: Robert Aldworth	Succeeded by William Yorke; John Kent
