= Robert Drew (politician) =

English lawyer and politician

Robert Drew (January 1575 – 1645) of Southbroom, Devizes, Wiltshire was an English lawyer and politician who sat in the House of Commons at various times between 1597 and 1625.

Drew was the son of John Drew of Southbroom and his wife Eleanor Cooke, daughter of William Cooke of Lacock. He matriculated at Christ Church, Oxford on 11 February 1592 aged 18 and entered Middle Temple in 1592. He succeeded to the estate of Southbroom on the death of his father in 1614.

In 1597, Drew was elected Member of Parliament for Devizes. On 18 May 1599 the Middle Temple benchers refused his call to the bar because he had not performed his "exercises of learning", but he was eventually called by 1602. He was re-elected MP for Devizes in 1601. From 1603 he was a common councilman for Devizes, remaining in post until 1640. He was re-elected MP for Devizes in 1604 and was a J.P. for Devizes from 1606 to 1640. In 1625 he was elected MP for Devizes once again.

Drew died at the age of about 70. He had married Jane Jackman, daughter of John Jackman, citizen and grocer of London on 25 May 1602. They had six sons and five daughters.

Parliament of England
Preceded by Henry Baynton; Richard Mompesson	Member of Parliament for Devizes; 1597–1611; With: John Kent 1597; Giles Fettiplace 1601; Sir Henry Baynton 1604–1611	Succeeded by Sir Edward Bayntun; William Kent
Preceded by John Kent; Sir Edward Bayntun	Member of Parliament for Devizes; 1625; With: Sir Edward Bayntun	Succeeded by Henry Ley; Robert Long
