= Coventre =

Coventre is a surname. Notable people with the surname include:

- Walter de Coventre (died 1371 or 1372), 14th-century Scottish ecclesiastic
- William Coventre (disambiguation), multiple people
- John Coventre (disambiguation), multiple people
- Thomas Coventre (disambiguation), multiple people
