= Fauconer =

Fauconer may refer to:

- John Fauconer, MP for Devizes (UK Parliament constituency)
- William Fauconer, MP for Hampshire (UK Parliament constituency)
- William Fauconer (died 1412), JP (Hants, 1407–1412), MP for Hampshire (1407 and 1411), buried in St. Mary's, Kingsclere.
