= William Rede (by 1529–at least 1569) =

English politician

William Rede (by 1529 – at least 1569) was an English politician during the reign of Mary I of England.

== Life ==
Rede was probably the son of the clothier Thomas Rede. He was probably the William who was from Yate, Gloucestershire and married a daughter of the clothier, Walter Bailey. He had a son, Edward Rede. In 1554, he was described as 'of Bristol', suggesting a possible connection to another William Rede, also a politician who died in 1558.

== Career ==
Rede was a Member of Parliament for Devizes in October 1553. He was admitted to the Middle Temple.

Parliament of England
Preceded by ?	Member of Parliament for Devizes; 1553; With: Thomas Hull	Succeeded by Thomas Highgate with Henry Leke
