= Baynton (surname) =

Baynton is an English surname. Notable people with the surname include:

- Andrew Baynton (fl. 1540), English scholar
- Barbara Baynton (1857–1929), Australian writer
- Henry Baynton (1892–1951), English actor
- Henry Baynton (died 1616) (c. 1571 – 1616), English politician
- Henry Baynton I (fl. 1572–1593), English politician
- Jack Baynton (1859–1939), English footballer
- Martin Baynton (born 1953), English writer
- Mary Baynton (fl. c.1533), impostor who pretended to be Henry VIII's daughter, the future Mary I of England
- Mathew Baynton, English actor
- Robert Baynton (1900–1924), English cricketer
- Thomas Baynton (1761–1820), English medical writer and surgeon

== See also ==
- Bayntun, a variant spelling
