= Richard Brunker =

14th-century English politician

Richard Brubker was a 14th-century English politician.

Brunker was a member of parliament for Devizes, Wiltshire in 1394. Nothing else is recorded of him.

Parliament of England
Preceded by William Coventre I with William Spicer	Member of Parliament for Devizes; 1394; With: John Tapener	Succeeded by Richard Cardmaker with William Spicer
