= Edward Bayntun (disambiguation) =

Edward Bayntun may refer to:

- Edward Bayntun (1480–1544), English courtier
- Edward Bayntun (died 1593) (1517–1593), English MP
- Sir Edward Bayntun (died 1657), (1593–1657), English MP
- Sir Edward Bayntun (died 1679), (1618–1679), English MP
- Edward Bayntun (died 1720), English MP for Calne 1705–1710
