= John Tapener =

English politician

John Tapener (fl. 1394) was an English politician. Tapener was a member of parliament for Devizes, Wiltshire in 1394. In 1379, he had paid 6d. in poll tax in Devizes. His occupation was then listed as shoemaker.

Parliament of England
Preceded by William Coventre I with William Spicer	Member of Parliament for Devizes; 1394; With: Richard Brunker	Succeeded by Richard Cardmaker with William Spicer
