= Edward Bayntun (died 1679) =

English politician

Sir Edward Bayntun (2 December 1618 – 26 July 1679) was an English politician who sat in the House of Commons variously between 1640 and 1679.

Bayntun was the son of Sir Edward Bayntun of Bromham, Wiltshire and his wife Elizabeth Maynard, daughter of Sir Henry Maynard of Eaton, Essex. He matriculated at St John's College, Oxford on 15 January 1636, aged 17. He was a student of Lincoln's Inn in 1638.

In April 1640, Bayntun was elected member of parliament for Devizes in the Short Parliament. He was re-elected MP for Devizes for the Long Parliament in November 1640 and sat until he was excluded under Pride's Purge in 1648. In 1654 he was re-elected MP for Devizes in the First Protectorate Parliament. He was elected MP for Calne in 1659 for the Third Protectorate Parliament and in 1660 for the Convention Parliament.

After the Restoration, Bayntun was appointed Knight of the Order of the Bath in 1661 and had a command in the Scots army. He was High Sheriff of Wiltshire in 1664. In 1675 he was elected MP for Devizes again and sat until his death in 1679.

Bayntun died at the age of 60 .

Bayntun married Stuarta Thynne, daughter of Sir Thomas Thynne. Their son Henry was also an MP in Wiltshire.

Parliament of England
Vacant Parliament suspended since 1629	Member of Parliament for Devizes; 1640–1648; With: Henry Danvers 1640; Robert Nicolas	Not represented in Barebones Parliament
Vacant Not represented in Barebones Parliament	Member of Parliament for Devizes; 1654	Succeeded by Edward Scotten
Vacant Not represented	Member of Parliament for Calne; 1659; With: William Duckett	Not represented in restored Rump
Vacant Not represented in restored Rump	Member of Parliament for Calne; 1660; With: William Duckett	Succeeded by William Duckett; George Lowe
Preceded by Edward Lewis; John Kent	Member of Parliament for Devizes; 1675–1679; With: George Johnson 1675–1679; Sir Walter Ernle	Succeeded by Sir Giles Hungerford; John Eyles
