= Richard Smith (MP for Devizes) =

English politician

Richard Smith (fl. 1402) was an English politician.

Smith was a Member of Parliament for Devizes, Wiltshire in 1402. It is thought that he was a relative of Robert Smith, also an MP for Devizes, but beyond this, nothing is known of him.

Parliament of England
| Preceded by ? | Member of Parliament for Devizes; 1402; With: Simon Skinner | Succeeded by ? |
