= Gobet =

Gobet is a surname. Notable people with the surname include:

- Fernand Gobet (born 1962), Swiss cognitive scientist and psychologist
- Louis Gobet (1908–1995), Swiss footballer
- Richard Gobet (fl.1382–1390), English politician
