= William Coventre =

William Coventre may refer to:

- William Coventre I, MP for Devizes October 1383 and 1393
- William Coventre II, MP for Melcombe Regis 1397
- William Coventre III (died c.1445), MP for Devizes 1414, 1415, 1417, May 1421, 1422, 1423, 1426, 1427 and 1433

== See also ==
- William Coventry (disambiguation)
