= Edward Lewis (Devizes MP) =

English landowner and politician

Edward Lewis (30 July 1650 – July 1674) was an English landowner and politician who sat in the House of Commons from 1669 to 1674.

Lewis was the son of William Lewis of The Van Glamorgan, also an MP for Devizes. He succeeded to the estates of his father in 1661 and travelled abroad from 1663 to 1666. In 1669 he was elected Member of Parliament (MP) for Devizes. He became a freeman of Devizes in 1670 and was Deputy Lieutenant for Glamorgan from 1670 until his death. He was J.P. for Monmouthshire, Glamorgan and Breconshire from 1672 and commissioner for assessment for Monmouthshire and Glamorgan from 1673.

Lewis died in London before 23 July 1674, when his will was proved by his brother-in-law William Jephson, who inherited Boarstall, his Buckinghamshire estate. His younger brother had predeceased him, and the estates in Wales went to his uncle Richard Lewis.

Parliament of England
Preceded by John Norden; John Kent	Member of Parliament for Devizes; 1669–1674; With: George Johnson	Succeeded by Edward Bayntun; George Johnson
