= Bayntun =

Bayntun is an English surname. Notable people with the surname include:

- Amelia Bayntun (1919–1988), English actress
- Edward Bayntun (disambiguation), several people
- George Bayntun (1873–1940), English bookseller, bookbinder and collector
- Henry Bayntun (disambiguation), several people

== See also ==
- Bayntun-Rolt baronets
- Bayntun-Sandys baronets
- Baynton (disambiguation)
