= William Addington, 3rd Viscount Sidmouth =

William Wells Addington, 3rd Viscount Sidmouth JP DL (25 March 1824 – 28 October 1913), was a British peer and politician.

== Background ==
Sidmouth was the son of Reverend William Leonard Addington, 2nd Viscount Sidmouth, eldest son of Prime Minister Henry Addington, 1st Viscount Sidmouth.

== Political career ==
Sidmouth was Member of Parliament for Devizes between 1863 and 1864.

== Personal life ==
Lord Sidmouth died in October 1913, aged 89, and was succeeded in the viscountcy by his son, Gerald.

== Arms ==
Coat of arms of William Addington, 3rd Viscount Sidmouth
Crest A Cat-a-mountain sejant guardant proper bezanty the dexter forepaw resting on an inescutcheon azure charged with a mace erect surmounted with a regal crown or within a bordure engrailed argent. Escutcheon Per pale ermine and ermines, a chevron charged with five lozenges counterchanged between three fleurs-de-lis or. Supporters Two stags, the dexter ermines the sinister ermine ,both attired and gorged with a chain pendant therefrom a key all or. Motto Libertas sub rege pio (Liberty under a pious king)

Parliament of the United Kingdom
Preceded by John Neilson Gladstone; Christopher Darby Griffith	Member of Parliament for Devizes; 1863–1864; With: Christopher Darby Griffith	Succeeded by Sir Thomas Bateson, Bt; Christopher Darby Griffith
Peerage of the United Kingdom
Preceded by William Addington	Viscount Sidmouth; 1864–1913	Succeeded by Gerald Addington
