= Tudor Rees =

British politician

His Honour Tudor Rees
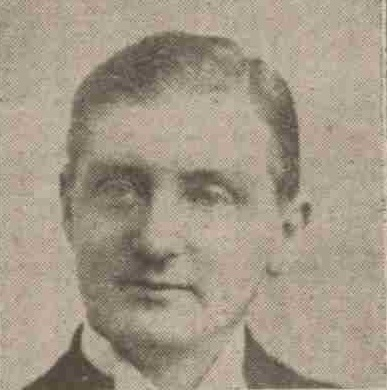

Member of Parliament for Barnstaple
- In office 6 December 1923 – 9 October 1924
- Preceded by: Basil Peto
- Succeeded by: Basil Peto
- In office 14 December 1918 – 26 October 1922
- Preceded by: Godfrey Baring
- Succeeded by: Basil Peto

Personal details
- Born: 1880
- Died: 27 February 1956 (aged 75–76) Tadworth, Surrey, England
- Party: Liberal
- Spouse: Dorothy Sidebotham (m. 1918)
- Children: 3

John Thomas Tudor Rees (1880 – 27 February 1956) was a Welsh lawyer, judge and Liberal politician.

== Family and education ==
Tudor Rees, as he was usually known, was the son of the late John Rees of Maesteg in Glamorgan and brother of Sir William Beddoe Rees, and the soldier and Military Cross recipient Sir Frederick Tavinor Rees. He was educated at the University of Wales. In 1918 he married Dorothy Sidebotham of Bowdon, Cheshire. They had one son and two daughters.

== Career ==
Rees’ chosen profession was the law. He practised as a solicitor in Cardiff but was later called to the Bar by Gray's Inn in 1922. In February 1939 he was appointed a County Court judge and sat at Whitechapel, Bow and at Uxbridge and Brentford County Courts. He also sat as a Justice of the Peace in Surrey and was later Chairman of Surrey Quarter Sessions. He retired from the Bench in 1955.

== War service ==
At outbreak of the First World War, Rees organised a recruiting campaign. In 1915 he volunteered for the Welsh Regiment eventually achieving the rank of Captain and also served in the Machine-Gun Corps.

== The Church ==
Rees was a devout Anglican who at one time thought about entering the Church. He retained an interest in ecclesiastical matters throughout his life and was a Lay Assessor in the Dioceses of Canterbury and Southwark. He was the author of a short work on disestablishment.

== Politics ==
Rees first entered Parliamentary politics at the 1918 general election when he was the Liberal candidate at Barnstaple in Devon. He declared he was a supporter of the Lloyd George coalition but so was his Unionist opponent, C S Parker He may have received the Coalition Coupon because he is described in one important and reliable record as a Coalition Liberal but Roy Douglas, a historian of the Liberal Party, believes Rees was one of 29 Liberal candidates denied the coupon. Another source indicates that Rees was denied the coupon but immediately accepted the Coalition Whip on getting into Parliament. At the time of the election Rees stated that his political priorities were the housing question and the reform of the jury system. He won the seat with a majority of 602 votes.

Rees was unable to hold his seat at Barnstaple at the 1922 general election losing narrowly by just 174 votes in a straight fight with the Conservative candidate Basil Peto. However, in 1923 when the Liberal Party was united around the question of Free Trade he won the seat back from Peto with a majority of 1,266 in a three-cornered contest including a Labour candidate. In 1924 he lost the seat back to Peto again in a straight fight by 1,195 votes. He did not contest the seat after 1924 or try to get back into the House of Commons for any other constituency.

Rees tended to be on the conservative wing of the Liberal Party. Chris Cook describes Rees as a member of a right-wing coterie of Liberal MPs who could usually be found supporting the Conservatives when the party vote was split during the period of the first Labour government of 1924.

== Other public service ==
Rees served as Deputy Chairman of the Road and Rail Traffic Appeal Tribunal and was made a freeman of the City of London in 1921 and of Epsom and Ewell in Surrey in 1954. He was also deputy lieutenant of Surrey.

== Death ==
His Honour Judge Tudor Rees died at his home in Tadworth, Surrey, aged 75 on 27 February 1956.

== Publications ==
- Our Jury System – publisher and date of publication not known
- Welsh Disestablishment, Objections Answered; Hodder & Stoughton 1912
- Reserved Judgment: Some Reflections and Recollections, Muller, 1956
- Divorce Handbook, Butterworth's 1963
- The Criminal Justice Act, 1948: an explanatory handbook for magistrates, practitioners and probation officers, Butterworth's 1949 (with Ernest Graham)
- Inquiry into the Compulsory Proposed Amalgamation of the County Police Forces of Leicestershire and Rutland, Home Office publications, 1950
- They Stand Apart: A critical survey of the problems of homosexuality (with H V Usill eds.) William Heinemann: London, 1955

Parliament of the United Kingdom
| Preceded by Godfrey Baring | Member of Parliament for Barnstaple; 1918–1922 | Succeeded by Basil Peto |
| Preceded by Basil Peto | Member of Parliament for Barnstaple; 1923–1924 | Succeeded by Basil Peto |
