= Baynton =

Baynton may refer to:

== Places ==
- Baynton, Victoria
- Baynton House, Coulston, Wiltshire, England
- Baynton and Baynton West, suburbs of Karratha, Western Australia

== Other uses ==
- Baynton (surname)

== See also ==
- Bayntun (disambiguation)
