= Heynes =

Heynes is a surname. Notable people with the surname include:

- Edward Heynes, MP for Devizes
- William Heynes (1903-1989), English automotive engineer

== See also ==
- Heynen
