= George Heneage Walker Heneage =

British politician

Member of Parliament for Devizes
- In office 25 May 1838 – 30 April 1857 Serving with John Neilson Gladstone (1852–1857); James Bucknall Bucknall Estcourt (1848–1852); William Heald Ludlow Bruges (1844–1848); T. H. S. Sotheron-Estcourt (1838–1844)
- Preceded by: T. H. S. Sotheron-Estcourt; James Whitley Deans Dundas
- Succeeded by: Simon Watson Taylor; Christopher Darby Griffith

Personal details
- Born: 17 July 1799
- Died: 21 September 1875 (aged 76)
- Party: Conservative

George Heneage Walker Heneage (17 July 1799 – 21 September 1875) was a British Conservative politician.

Heneage was appointed Conservative MP for Devizes in May 1838 after the sitting MP, James Whitley Deans Dundas, was unseated due to bribery at the 1837 general election. He held the seat until 1857 when he did not see re-election at that year's general election.

Parliament of the United Kingdom
Preceded by T. H. S. Sotheron-Estcourt; James Whitley Deans Dundas	Member of Parliament for Devizes; 1838–1857; With: John Neilson Gladstone (1852–1857); James Bucknall Bucknall Estcourt (1848–1852); William Heald Ludlow Bruges (1844–1848); T. H. S. Sotheron-Estcourt (1838–1844)	Succeeded by Simon Watson Taylor; Christopher Darby Griffith
