= John Snell (MP for Devizes) =

English landowner and politician (died 1587)

John Snell (by 1537 – 17 November 1587), of Kington St Michael, Wiltshire, was an English landowner who was the Member (MP) of the Parliament of England for Devizes from 1580 to 1584.

He was the eldest son of Nicholas Snell (by 1515 – 1577), an MP for various Wiltshire seats, and his wife Alice, daughter of John Pye. The family had extensive landholdings on the Wiltshire–Somerset border, including the manor of Kington St Michael. In 1575, John Snell bought Eaton Piercy manor in Kington parish; after this transaction the family owned almost the whole parish. In the footsteps of his father, he was appointed JP c.1579, and was High Sheriff of Wiltshire for 1584.

At a by-election in January 1580 caused by the death of George Reynolds, Snell was elected for the Devizes seat. He did not return to Parliament at the 1584 general election.

Snell died on 17 November 1587 and was buried at Kington St Michael. He had married Katherine (died 1566), daughter of John Warneford of Sevenhampton, and they had two sons and three daughters; his second marriage was to one Susanna (died 1570). His eldest son, Thomas, married Anne, daughter of Robert Long of Wraxhall and Draycot Cerne, and was in turn High Sheriff for 1598.
