= John Kingston =

John Kingston may refer to:

- John Kingston (Australian politician) (born 1935), member of the Legislative Assembly of Queensland
- John Kingston (MP for Devizes), 1406
- John Kingston (MP for Lymington) (1736–1820), member of parliament for Lymington, 1802-1814
- John Kingston Jr. (1860–1898), member of the Wisconsin State Senate 1891–1893
- John Kingston (linguist), American linguist
- John Ortell Kingston (1919–1987), leader of the Latter Day Church of Christ of Mormon fundamentalists in Davis County, Utah
- John E. Kingston (1925–1996), member of the New York State Assembly
- John T. Kingston (1819–1899), member of the Wisconsin State Senate and Assembly
- John Kingston III (born 1965), investor and candidate for United States senator from Massachusetts
- Jack Kingston (born 1955), former U.S. representative for Georgia
- John Kingston (publisher) (1769–1824), Methodist minister, publisher and author
- John de Kingston, English knight
- John Kingston (rugby union) (born 1960), rugby union coach and player
