= Delabere =

Delabere is a surname. Notable people with the surname include:

- John Delabere (before 1559–1607), English politician
- Leonard Delabere Bestall (1895–1959), New Zealand architect, draper, museum director and benefactor
- Richard Delabere (c.1559–1636), English politician
- Warren Delabere Barnes (1865–1911), British colonial administrator

== See also ==
- Delabere Pritchett Blaine (1768–1845), British vetrinarian
