= Francis Merewether =

Francis Merewether may refer to:

- Francis Merewether (English politician)
- Francis Merewether (Australian politician)
