= John Kingston (MP for Devizes) =

English politician

John Kingston (fl. 1406) was an English politician.

Kingston was a member of parliament for Devizes, Wiltshire in 1406.

Parliament of England
Preceded by ?	Member of Parliament for Devizes; 1406; With: John Huwet	Succeeded by John Peyntour with Simon Skinner
