= Peyntour =

Peyntour is a surname. Notable people with the surname include:

- John Peyntour (14th–15th centuries), English politician
- Stephen Peyntour, MP for Sandwich (UK Parliament constituency)
- Johannes Peyntour, MP for Lewes (UK Parliament constituency)
