= John Coventry =

John Coventry may refer to:

- John Coventry (Royalist) (died 1652), English politician, MP for Evesham
- Sir John Coventry (Weymouth MP) (1636–1685), MP for Weymouth and Melcombe Regis, son of the above
- John Coventry, 4th Baron Coventry (1654–1687), English nobleman
- John Bulkeley Coventry (1724–1801), MP for Worcestershire
- John Coventry (instrument maker) (1735–1812), English instrument maker
- John Coventry (cricketer) (1903–1969), English cricketer

== See also ==
- John Coventre (disambiguation)
