= William Salter (MP) =

English politician

William Salter (died 1404) was an English politician.

== Life ==
Salter was from Devizes, Wiltshire, and represented his town in Parliament. He was a weaver, and one of the wealthiest men in his area. He was married to Margaret, and they had one daughter. His grandson, Richard Bytefynger, was his main heir.

== Career ==
Salter was Member of Parliament for Devizes in February 1383, 1386, February 1388, January 1397, September 1397 and 1399.

Parliament of England
Unknown	Member of Parliament for Devizes; 1386; With: Richard Gobet	Succeeded by Richard Cardmaker
