= John Coventre =

John Coventre may refer to:

- John Coventre (MP for Devizes) (died c.1430)
- John Coventre (MP for Chipping Wycombe) (died c.1440)

== See also ==
- John Coventry (disambiguation)
