= Peto baronets =

Baronetcy in the Baronetage of the United Kingdom

Escutcheon of the Peto baronets

There have been two baronetcies created for members of the Peto family, both in the Baronetage of the United Kingdom. As of 2014, both creations are extant.

The Peto baronetcy, of Somerleyton Hall in the County of Suffolk, was created in the Baronetage of the United Kingdom on 22 February 1855 for the entrepreneur and Liberal politician Samuel Morton Peto. He was a railway contractor and also represented Norwich, Finsbury and Bristol in the House of Commons.

The Peto baronetcy, of Barnstaple in the County of Devon, was created in the Baronetage of the United Kingdom on 27 January 1927 for the Conservative politician Basil Peto. He sat as Member of Parliament for Devizes and Barnstaple. Peto was the seventh son of the first Baronet of the 1855 creation.

== Peto baronets, of Somerleyton Hall (1855) ==
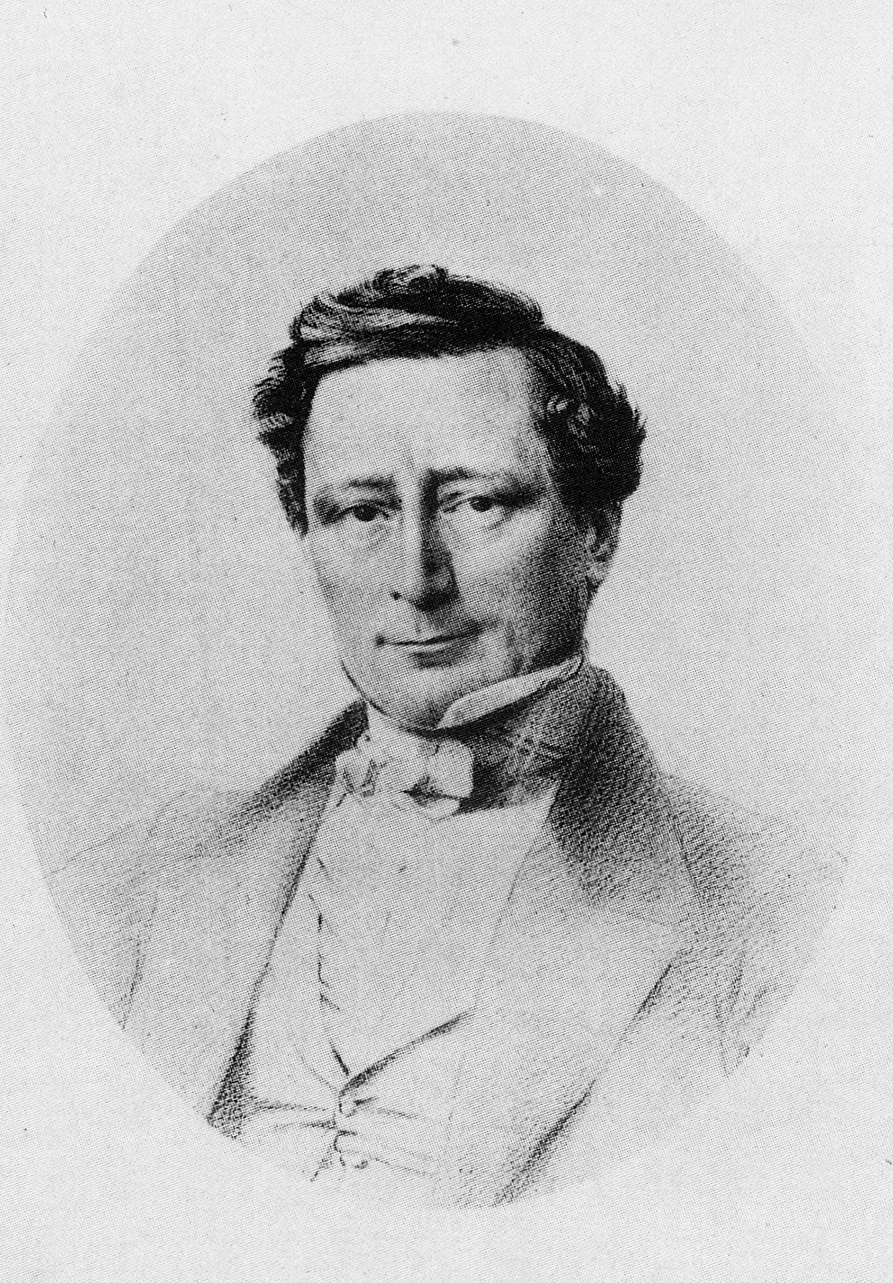
Sir Morton Peto, 1st Baronet

- Sir Samuel Morton Peto, 1st Baronet (1809–1889)
- Sir Henry Peto, 2nd Baronet (1840–1938)
- Sir (Henry) Francis Morton Peto, 3rd Baronet (1889–1978)
- Sir Henry George Morton Peto, 4th Baronet (1920–2010)
- Sir Francis Michael Morton Peto, 5th Baronet (born 1949)

The heir apparent is the present holder's son David James Morton Peto (born 1978).

== Peto baronets, of Barnstaple (1927) ==
- Sir Basil Edward Peto, 1st Baronet (1862–1945)
- Sir James Michael Peto, 2nd Baronet (1894–1971)
- Sir Christopher Henry Maxwell Peto, 3rd Baronet (1897–1980)
- Sir Michael Henry Basil Peto, 4th Baronet (1938–2008)
- Sir Henry Christopher Morton Bampfylde Peto, 5th Baronet (born 1967)

The heir apparent is the present holder's son Jake Christopher Bampfylde Peto (born 2004).
