= Simon Watson-Taylor (landowner) =

British landowner and politician (1811–1902)

Simon Watson-Taylor (1811 – 25 December 1902) was a British landowner in Wiltshire and Jamaica, who briefly served as a Liberal Member of Parliament for Devizes between the 1857 election and that of 1859.

== Early life ==
Watson-Taylor was born in 1811, to Jamaican planters George Watson-Taylor, later a Member of Parliament, and his wife Anna, a daughter of Sir John Taylor, 1st Baronet, of Vale Royal (the current Prime Ministerial mansion). His father used the wealth from their Jamaican plantations to acquire estates in Wiltshire, at Erlestoke, Coulston (including Baynton House), and Edington, along with a large art collection.

== Jamaican interests ==
The Taylor (Tailzour before anglicisation) family – and Watson-Taylor's father, through his marriage – derived its wealth from sugar and slavery in the Colony of Jamaica. In 1852, Simon Watson-Taylor inherited Jamaican estates from his mother Anna. However, the vast majority of the wealth created by her great-uncle Simon Tailzour had been largely squandered by George Watson-Taylor. Watson-Taylor maintained a strong interest in the affairs of Jamaica and offered public support to Governor Edward John Eyre, after he brutally suppressed the Morant Bay rebellion of 1865. Watson-Taylor helped to found the Eyre Defence Fund, which aimed to vindicate the former governor as an imperial hero.

== Family ==
On 30 June 1843, Watson-Taylor married Lady Hannah Charlotte Hay (1818–1887), one of the eight daughters of Field Marshal George Hay, 8th Marquess of Tweeddale (1787–1876). There were four sons and seven daughters from their marriage.

Watson-Taylor lived at Urchfont Manor from about 1850 to 1862.

Parliament of the United Kingdom
Preceded by John Gladstone and George Heneage	Member of Parliament for Devizes; 1857–1859; With: Christopher Darby Griffith	Succeeded by Christopher Darby Griffith and John Gladstone
