= John Neilson Gladstone =

British politician

Captain John Neilson Gladstone
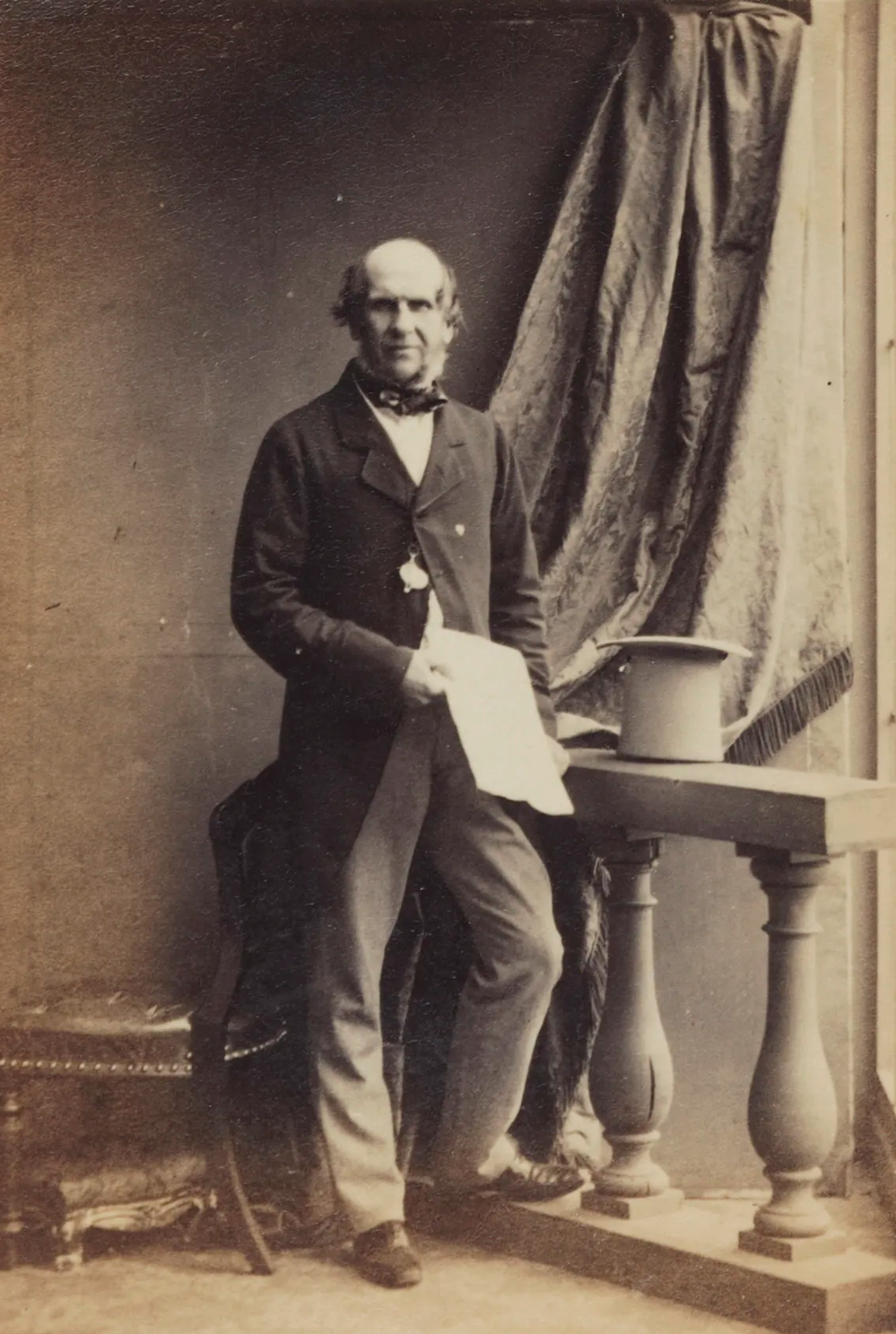
- Portrait by Camille Silvy, 1860

Member of Parliament for Devizes
- In office 1859 – 7 February 1863
- Preceded by: Simon Watson Taylor
- Succeeded by: William Addington

Member of Parliament for Devizes
- In office 1852–1857
- Preceded by: James Bucknall Bucknall Estcourt
- Succeeded by: Simon Watson Taylor

Member of Parliament for Ipswich
- In office August 1842 – 1847
- Preceded by: John Cuffe, 3rd Earl of Desart
- Succeeded by: John Cobbold

Member of Parliament for Walsall
- In office February 1841 – 1841
- Preceded by: Francis Finch
- Succeeded by: Robert Wellbeloved Scott

Personal details
- Born: 18 January 1807 Liverpool, Lancashire, England
- Died: 7 February 1863 (aged 56) Bowden Park, Wiltshire, England
- Party: Conservative
- Spouse: Elizabeth Honoria Bateson (m. 1839-1862)
- Children: Sir John Gladstone, 4th Baronet
- Parents: Sir John Gladstone; Anne MacKenzie Robertson
- Relatives: Thomas Gladstone (brother); Robertson Gladstone (brother); William Ewart Gladstone (brother); Helen Jane Gladstone (sister)

Military service
- Allegiance: United Kingdom
- Branch/service: Royal Navy
- Years of service: 1820-1840

Captain John Neilson Gladstone (18 January 1807 – 7 February 1863) was a British Conservative Party politician and an officer in the Royal Navy. A brother of politician William Ewart Gladstone, later British Prime Minister, he served as a Member of Parliament (MP) for most of the years 1841 to 1863.

== Early life ==
He was the fourth child of Sir John Gladstone, a Scottish-born businessman who settled in Liverpool and made a large fortune initially from trading in corn with the United States and cotton with Brazil, and later through sugar plantations in Jamaica. His mother was Anne MacKenzie née Robertson, from Dingwall. His younger brother was the politician William Ewart Gladstone, later British Prime Minister, and his elder brother Thomas was also an MP.

He attended Eton and then Christ Church, Oxford.

== Naval career ==
Gladstone attended the Royal Naval College, Portsmouth from 1820. He spent eight years at sea, but thereafter was still able to gain promotion to Captain RN. William decided to undertake a tour of European cities in 1832 with his naval brother, who was temporarily without a ship. They spent 179 days together criss-crossing Europe, travelling by post-chaise. Leaving London on 1 February 1832 they crossed the Channel into Brittany. By 1 March they had arrived at Turin, where they tarried a week, before moving on to Genoa. They were at Rome during April for a whole month, 25 days in Naples and 10 days in Rome before turning for home on 5 June. Via Ravenna and Bologna they visited Venice; and then onto the Lakes Garda and Como, pausing four days in Milan, before travelling across the Alps to Geneva. From Basle they took a boat down the Rhine, and overland to Brussels and Ostend. They arrived back in London on 28 July 1832.

In 1839 he married Elizabeth Honoria, daughter of William Bateson. They purchased Bowden Park, near Chippenham in Wiltshire where he chose to settle.

== Political career ==
No longer able to get a ship at sea with the Royal Navy, he stood as a Conservative and won the seat of Walsall in a by-election on 4 February 1841; the general election in June of that year obscured the raising of a petition against him for corrupt electoral practices. His Anti-Corn Law League opponent accused him of using money from slavery to pay for election expenses. The accusation from J B Smith was flatly denied, both that his family had anything to do with a West India slavery plantation, until after its abolition, and that the rumours of compensation were much exaggerated.

He won another by-election, this time at Ipswich in 1842 and sat there until 1847. During that parliament 'Captain Gladstone' spoke against corn law repeal, arguing that agriculture would suffer if protective tariffs were removed. Small farmers would be bankrupted, with no commensurate gain to burgeoning manufacturers. He expressed great regret at being forced to oppose the Prime Minister, Sir Robert Peel. "I suppose the agriculturists are not supposed to have any mind, as the late county elections prove that they are strongly opposed to it", he declared; "but being convinced that the main feature of the whole is the total repeal of the Corn Laws, ...the community interested in agriculture should, at the earliest possible period, know its fate, I feel compelled to endeavour to stop the measure on the threshold, and to vote for the Amendment".

On 13 April 1847 he supported the recommendation of the Admiralty for the salvage of the wreck of HMS Thetis.

He was MP for Devizes from 1852, lost his seat in 1857, but was re-elected in 1859.

== Death ==
His brothers were all in attendance at Bowden Park for the over-wrought emotional scene at John Neilson's deathbed. William arrived early in February 1863, three days before his brother died, and took great care over a period of ten days, which he later related in some detail in his diaries. John Neilson left seven daughters and a son without parents, orphans, making William wholly responsible for the funeral arrangements. The money William acquired in his brother's will went to supplement the budget of his Midlothian campaign. A writ was moved only five days later in the Commons for a new member.

== Notes ==
=== See also ===
- O'Byrne, William Richard (1849). "Gladstone, John Neilson" . A Naval Biographical Dictionary . John Murray – via Wikisource.

=== References ===
Bibliography

- Jenkins, Roy (1995). Gladstone. London.

Parliament of the United Kingdom
Preceded by Francis Finch	Member of Parliament for Walsall; Feb 1841 – Jun 1841	Succeeded by Robert Scott
Preceded by Thomas Gladstone and John Cuffe, Earl of Desart	Member of Parliament for Ipswich; 1842 – 1847; With: Sackville Lane-Fox	Succeeded by John Cobbold and Sir Hugh Adair
Preceded by James Bucknall-Estcourt and George Heneage	Member of Parliament for Devizes; 1852 – 1857; With: George Heneage	Succeeded by Simon Watson Taylor and Christopher Griffith
Preceded by Simon Watson Taylor and Christopher Darby Griffith	Member of Parliament for Devizes; 1859 – 1863; With: Christopher Griffith	Succeeded by William Addington and Christopher Griffith
