= Henry Webbe =

English politician

Henry Webbe was a 14th-century English politician.

Webbe was a Member of Parliament for Devizes, Wiltshire in 1385 and January 1397.

The first mention of Webbe is in 1379, when he paid 1s towards the poll tax in Devizes. In June 1380, he was appointed one of the three deputies of the royal alnager of cloth, MP William Hervy. The last mention of him was in 1407, when he stood surety for Simon Skinner at Parliament. There is a mention of a Henry Webbe 'of Wiltshire' in 1412, who was owed money by John Prentys, and this may have been him.
