= John Kent (died 1630) =

English politician

John Kent (1559 – 1 October 1630) was an English politician who sat in the House of Commons at various times between 1597 and 1624.

Kent was the son of Roger Kent of Copenhall, Cheshire and his wife Petronelle Hawkins. He was a student of Barnard's Inn in about 1586. He was in the service of the Earl of Hertford. From 1591 to 1592 he was chamberlain of Devizes and from 1592 was town clerk of Devizes from c.1592. He was also coroner in 1592. In 1597, he was elected Member of Parliament for Devizes. From 1597 to 1626 he was clerk of the peace for Wiltshire. He was Mayor of Devizes from 1602 to 1603. In 1621 he was elected MP for Devizes again. He was re-elected MP for Devizes in 1624.

Kent died at the age of 71, and was buried in St. John's church, Devizes.

Kent married Maria Wyatt, daughter of Thomas Wyatt of Calne and had three sons and a daughter.

Parliament of England
Preceded by Henry Baynton; Richard Mompesson	Member of Parliament for Devizes; 1597; With: Robert Drew	Succeeded by Giles Fettiplace; Robert Drew
Preceded by Sir Edward Bayntun; William Kent	Member of Parliament for Devizes; 1621–1624; With: Sir Henry Lee; Sir Edward Bayntun	Succeeded by Edward Bayntun; Robert Drew
