= Robert Chandler (MP for Devizes) =

English politician

Robert Chandler (fl. 1420–1429) was an English politician.

He was a member (MP) of the parliament of England for Devizes in 1420, 1425 and 1429.
