= Heynen =

Heynen is a surname. Notable people with the surname include:

- Bryan Heynen (born 1997), Belgian footballer
- Hilde Heynen (born 1959), Belgian academic
- Julia Heynen, American actress
- Vital Heynen (born 1969), Belgian volleyball coach and player

== See also ==
- Heynes
