= Thomas Coventre =

Thomas Coventre may refer to:

- Thomas Coventre (MP for Oxford), MP for Oxford (UK Parliament constituency), 1404–1435
- Thomas Coventre (MP for Devizes) (died 1451), MP for Devizes, 1414 and 1425

== See also ==
- Thomas Coventry (disambiguation)
