= Robert Tyndale =

English politician

Robert Tyndale (fl. 1417–1419) of Devizes, Wiltshire, was an English politician.

He was a member (MP) of the parliament of England for Devizes in 1417 and 1419.
