= Thomas Coventry =

Thomas Coventry may refer to:

- Thomas Coventry, 1st Baron Coventry (1578–1640), English lawyer, politician and judge
- Thomas Coventry, 2nd Baron Coventry (1606–1661), English politician
- Thomas Coventry, 1st Earl of Coventry (c. 1629–1699)
- Thomas Coventry, 2nd Earl of Coventry (died 1710), English peer
- Thomas Henry Coventry, Viscount Deerhurst (1721–1744), British Tory Member of Parliament
- Thomas Coventry (cricketer) (1778–1816), English amateur cricketer
- Thomas George Coventry (1885–1972), English-born agent and political figure in British Columbia
- Thomas Coventry (politician) (c. 1713–1797), British lawyer, financier, and politician

== See also ==
- Thomas Coventre (disambiguation)
