= James Johnson (bishop of Worcester) =

English prelate

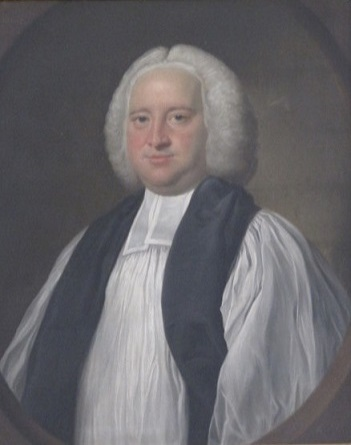
James Johnson, portrait at Hartlebury Castle

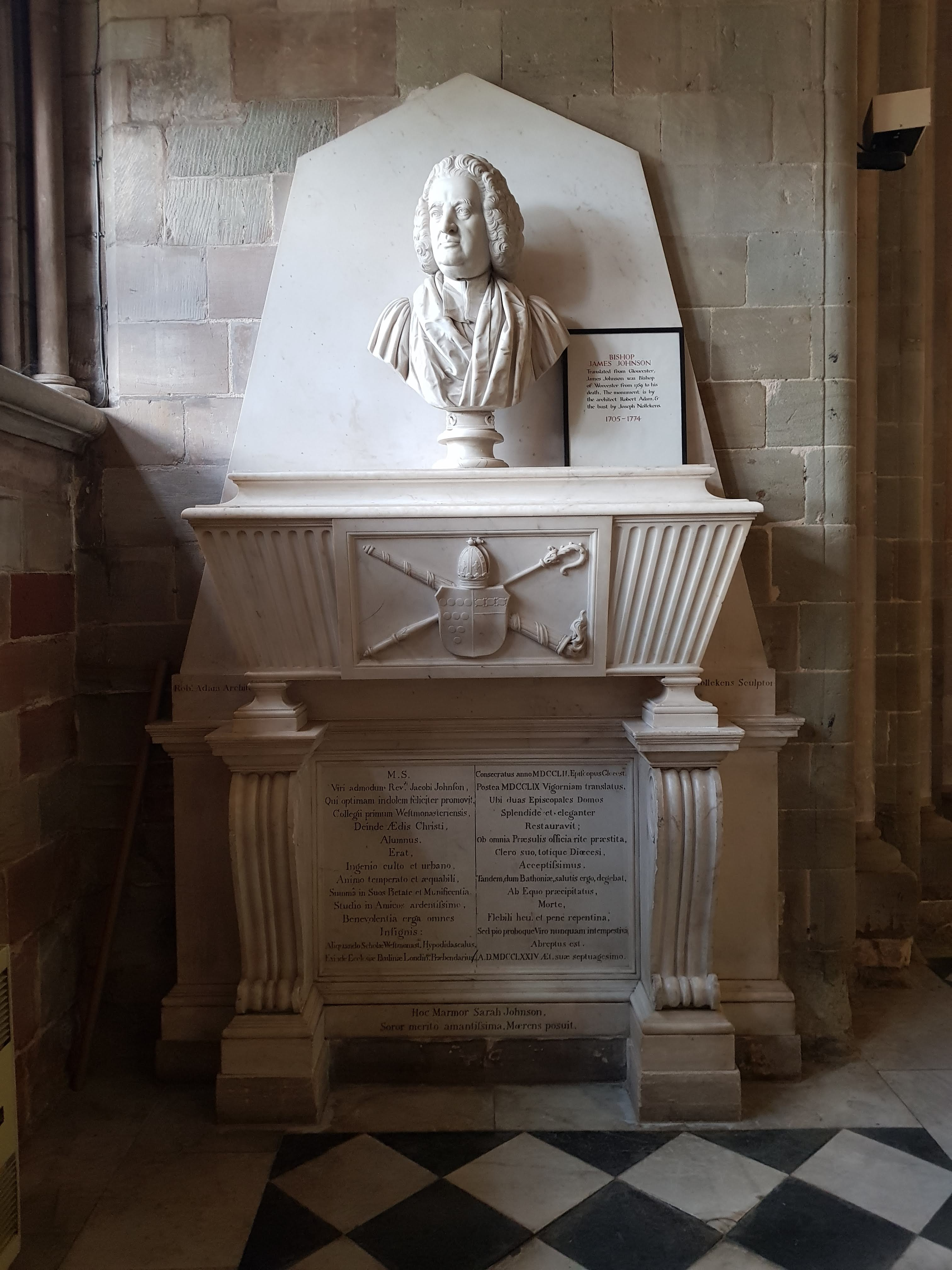
Monument in Worcester Cathedral to James Johnson, Bishop of Worcester. Arms: See of Worcester impaling Johnson (Argent, a bend sable on a chief of the second three wool-packs of the first)

James Johnson (1705 – 28 November 1774) was an English prelate, successively Bishop of Gloucester (1752–1759) and of Worcester (1759–1774).

== Life ==
James Johnson was born in Melford, Suffolk, to James Johnson (a priest and author) and Anne Cuthbert. His grandfather was George Johnson MP, a judge and counsellor of Charles II. He was educated at Westminster School in London as a King's Scholar before matriculating at Christ Church, Oxford in 1724, graduating B.A. in 1728 (M.A. in 1731), and B.D. and D.D. in 1742.

Ordained deacon and priest in 1731, Johnson became Second Master of Westminster School (1733–1748) and held the rectory of Turweston (1741–1744), then concurrently the rectory of Berkhampstead (1743–1759) and of Mixbury (1744–1759), and the vicarage of Watford (1744–1759).

In 1748 he was appointed a chaplain to King George II and canon residentiary of St. Paul's Cathedral. In 1752 he was consecrated Bishop of Gloucester but was quickly embroiled in a scandal involving allegations of Jacobitism. Christopher Fawcett had gossiped to Lord Ravensworth that Johnson, Andrew Stone and William Murray had drunk to the health of the Pretender in their youth. The allegations were brought all the way to the House of Lords and were subsequently thrown out.

Johnson was translated to the see of Worcester in 1759 and made many alterations to Hartlebury Castle, the residence of the Bishops of Worcester, out of his own pocket. He was also a patron of Benjamin West, commissioning "The Return of the Prodigal Son".

Johnson died in 1774 from a fall from his horse in Stall Street, Bath. There is a monument to him in Worcester Cathedral.

Church of England titles
Preceded by Martin Benson	Bishop of Gloucester; 1752–1759	Succeeded by William Warburton
Preceded by Isaac Maddox	Bishop of Worcester; 1759–1774	Succeeded by Brownlow North
