= Henry Grube =

English politician

Henry Grube (died 1582), of Devizes, Wiltshire, was an English politician.

He was a member (MP) of the parliament of England for Devizes in 1572. He was Mayor of Devizes in 1568 and 1573.
