= John Baker (fl. 1421) =

English politician

John Baker (fl. 1421), of Devizes, Wiltshire, was an English politician.

He was a member (MP) of the parliament of England for Devizes in December 1421.
