= Thomas Kent (MP) =

English politician

Thomas Kent (1590–1656), of Winsley and Devizes, Wiltshire, was an English politician.

He was a member (MP) of the parliament of England for Devizes in 1628.
