= William Coventry (disambiguation) =

William Coventry (c. 1628–1686) was an English statesman.

William Coventry may also refer to:

- William of Coventry (fl. c. 1340–1360), an English Carmelite friar and historian
- William Coventry, 5th Earl of Coventry (c. 1676–1751), an English nobleman and politician

== See also ==
- William Coventre (disambiguation)
