= Richard Pudsey =

English politician

Richard Pudsey (fl. 1492) was an English politician.

Pudsey was a member (MP) of the parliament of England for Devizes in 1492.
