= William Coventre III =

English politician

William Coventre (died c. 1445) was an English politician.

Coventre was a Member of Parliament for Devizes in November 1414, 1415, 1417, May 1421, 1422, 1423, 1426, 1427 and 1433.

He was probably the son of William Coventre I.
