= James Johnson (author and priest) =

English author and cleric

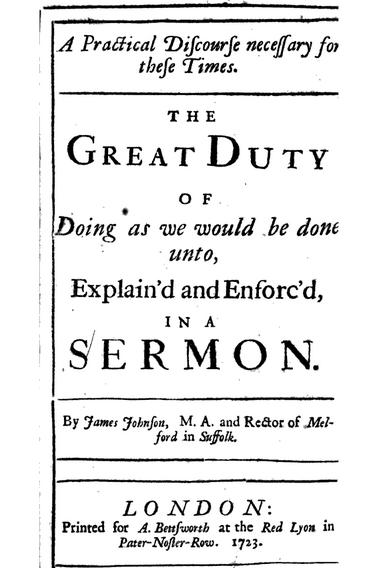
Johnson's sermon, published in 1723

Rev. James Johnson (1674 – 1 August 1741) was an English author and priest.

Johnson was born at Bowden Park, near Lacock in Wiltshire, a son of George Johnson MP, judge and counsellor of Charles II. He took his Bachelor of Arts from Hertford College, Oxford before his Master of Arts from Oriel College, Oxford, in 1698. In 1701, he was presented by Sir John Cordell Bt MP as rector of Long Melford, Suffolk. He wrote The Great Duty, a Christian meditation on the Golden Rule, in 1723.

Johnson married Anne Cuthbert, daughter of Thomas, and died at Long Melford in 1741. Their son James successively became Bishop of Gloucester and of Worcester.
