= Henry Morris (MP) =

16th-century English politician

Henry Morris (by 1536 – will proved 1573), of Devizes, Wiltshire, was an English politician.

He was a member (MP) of the parliament of England for Devizes in 1558.
