= Kington St Michael =

Village in Wiltshire, England

Coordinates: 51.497°N 02.143°W

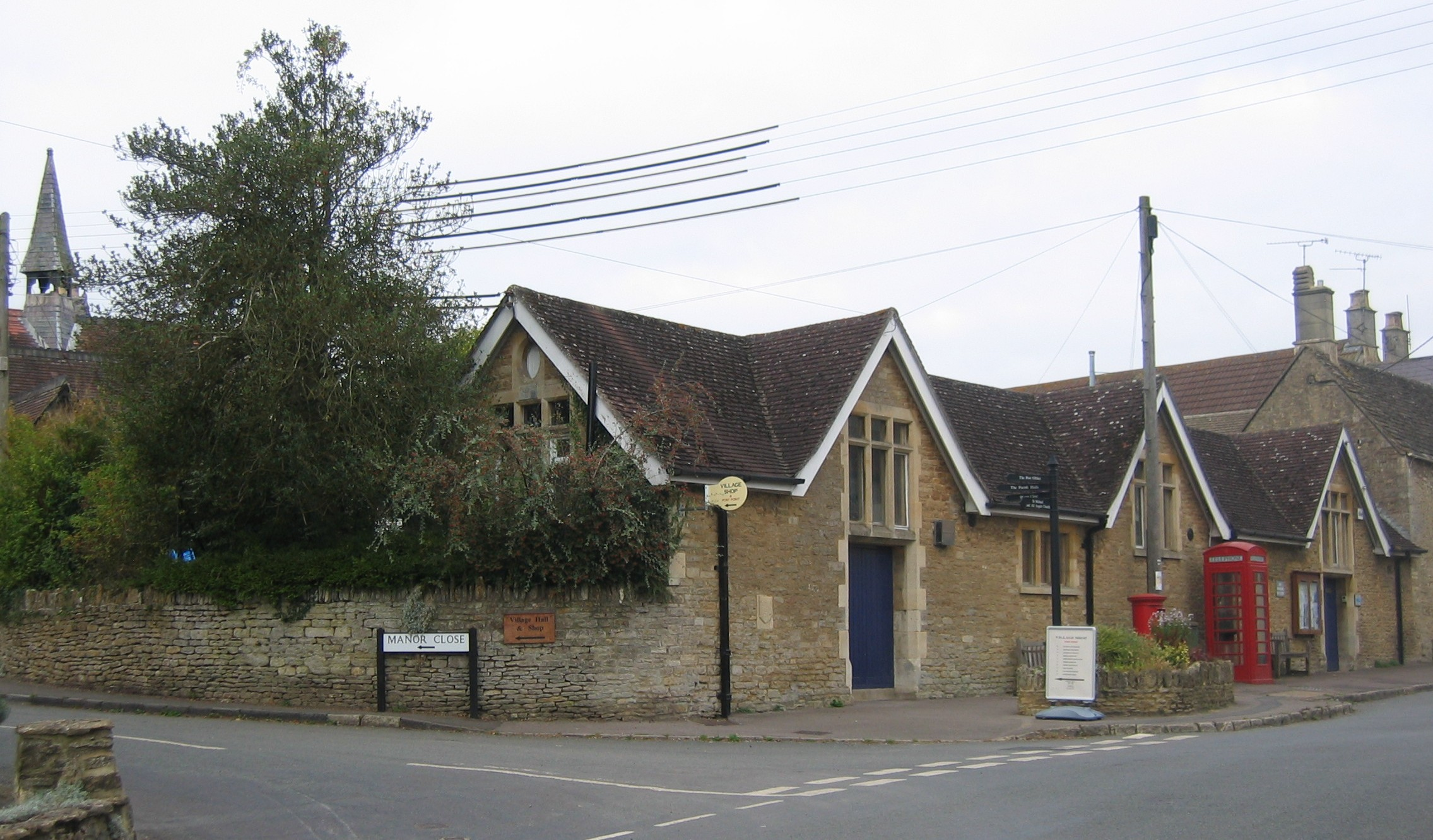
- South end of the village

- Location within Wiltshire
- Population: 704 (in 2011)
- OS grid reference: ST902776
- Civil parish: Kington St Michael
- Unitary authority: Wiltshire
- Ceremonial county: Wiltshire
- Region: South West
- Country: England
- Sovereign state: United Kingdom
- Post town: Chippenham
- Postcode district: SN14
- Dialling code: 01249
- Police: Wiltshire
- Fire: Dorset and Wiltshire
- Ambulance: South Western
- UK Parliament: South Cotswolds
- Website: Parish Council

Kington St Michael is a village and civil parish about 3 miles (4.8 km) north of Chippenham in Wiltshire, England.

== Location ==
Kington St Michael is about 0.7 miles (1.1 km) west of the A350 which links Chippenham with junction 17 of the M4 motorway; the village is about 1.5 miles (2.4 km) southwest of the junction.

It is largely a linear village based on its main street, which runs from southeast to northwest, where Honey Knob Hill leads into open countryside towards Grittleton. Easton Piercy, west of the village and now a farm and a few houses, was formerly a tithing of Kington St Michael, which had its own chapel in medieval times and a population of 41 in the 1840s.

== History ==
A brief history of Kington St Michael is given in the relevant Wiltshire Community History page.

There is evidence of habitation of the area in the New Stone Age and Bronze Ages. The first named settlement dates to about AD 934, when it was known as "Kington". Both Kington (Chintone) and Easton (Estone) were small settlements at the time of the 1086 Domesday survey. Later known as "Kington Minchin" during the early existence of Kington St. Michael Priory, it became "Kington St Michael" in 1279 when the church was rededicated to St Michael.

Land in the area was given by the kings to Glastonbury Abbey in the 10th century. After the Dissolution, in 1544 Nicholas Snell bought Kington Michael manor from the Crown; he and/or his father, Richard, had been employed by the last abbot of Glastonbury. The Snell family accumulated extensive estates on the Wiltshire–Somerset border, and after John (son of Nicholas) bought Easton Piercy manor in 1575, they owned almost the whole of the parish. The manor house built by Nicholas remained in the family until 1651; when the present house, north-west of the church, was built in 1863 some details from the Snell's house were reused, including the Snell crest over a window.

A market cross was adjacent to the Priory and according to Aubrey, staple foods were sold there. A Michaelmas Fair was noted for its "ale and geese".

For many years the main activity in the village was agriculture, although there is some evidence of a small textile industry. In about 1760 the Chippenham to Malmesbury road (now the A350) was made a turnpike, and Kington benefited from the increase in traffic, by the end of the 18th century supporting "tailors, two blacksmiths and a carpenter ... [and] a slaughterhouse, malthouse and public house". By 1851 the range of occupations reported in the village had expanded further.

An area of 15 acres (6 ha) was transferred from the parish to Chippenham Without in 1971.

== Parish church ==
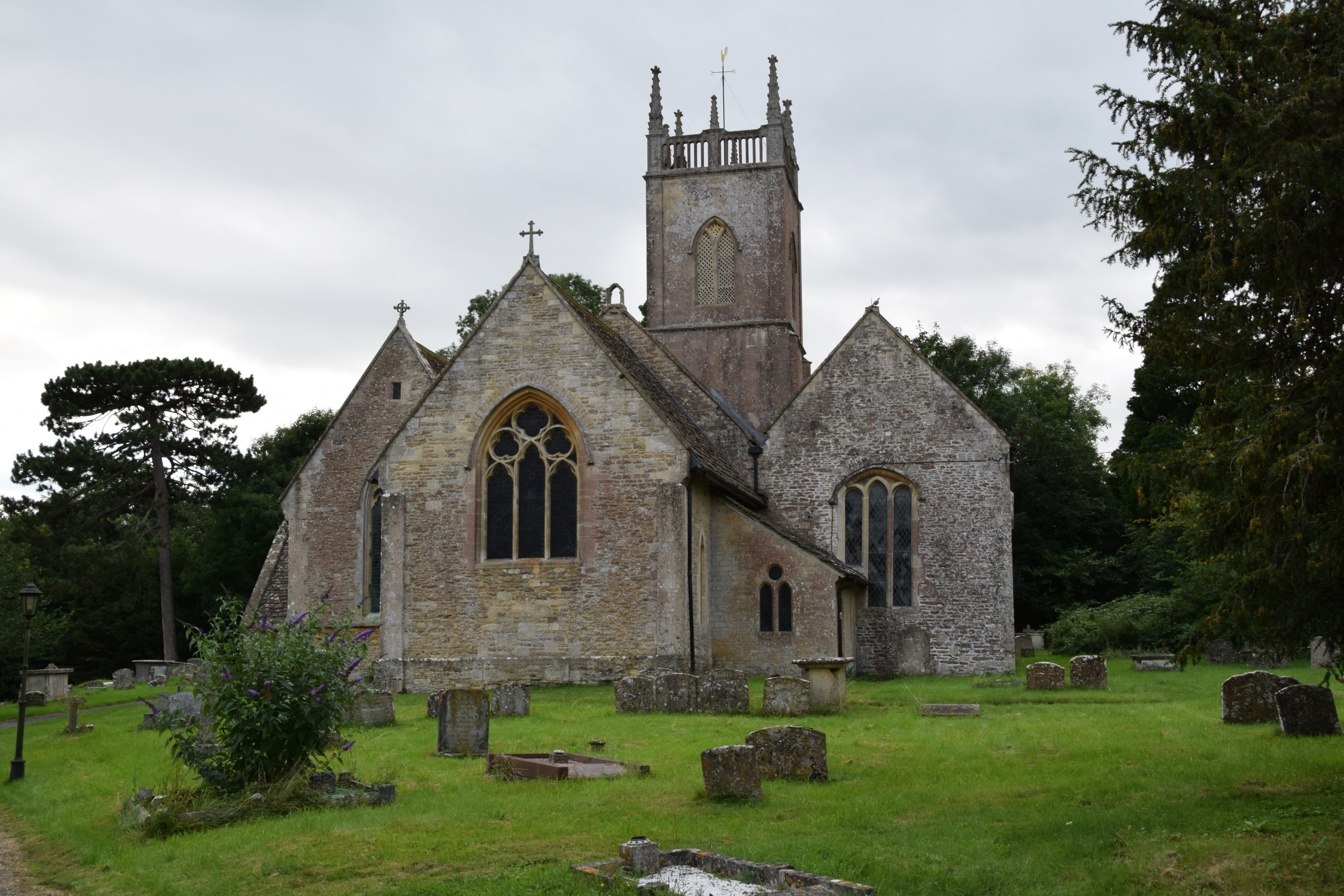
Kington St Michael church

The Church of England parish church of St Michael is Grade II* listed. The rubble stone church has a west tower and a small chancel; in between, the nave and the wide north and south aisles each have a gabled roof. There is evidence of a 12th-century church in the wide chancel arch (much restored) and in the jambs of the south doorway, which have carved capitals.

The chancel is 13th-century: the style of its lancet windows and piscina is from late in that century, and the same goes for the south aisle, including the windows on either side of the porch. The chancel has one flat-headed 15th-century window, and the south door and doorway is from the 15th or 16th centuries. The tower and spire fell in a storm in 1703; the replacement tower with pierced battlement and tall pinnacles is described by Pevsner as "an interesting endeavour in the Gothic style". The north aisle was rebuilt in 1755 in a conservative style.

Much work was carried out in the 19th century: the ashlar front to the porch (with thin neo-Norman arch), the vestry, and all the roofs apart from the north aisle are from that period, as are the reredos, the west window of the south aisle and the east chancel window. Restoration in 1857–8 by J. H. Hakewill led Pevsner to describe the church as "terribly over-restored" and the arcades as "not enjoyable". Several windows have 19th-century stained glass, including the brightly coloured 1857 east window of the south aisle which commemorates the antiquarians John Aubrey and John Britton, both born in the parish.

The stone font is cylindrical with a roll moulding, on a short shaft. The ring of six bells in the tower was cast by Abraham Rudhall II in 1726. The lychgate at the main entrance to the churchyard, in rubble stone and ashlar, was built in 1917 to designs of Harold Brakspear as a memorial to Herbert Prodgers of Kington Manor. It is flanked by short curved walls terminated with gate-piers having ball finials, remnants of a 1760 gateway. Monuments in the churchyard include eight chest tombs and a pedestal tomb, from the 18th and early 19th centuries; they are listed as a group at Grade II*, the listing stating that "the early to mid C18 monuments in this group are of exceptional quality".

The ancient parish included Langley tithing and its village, now Kington Langley. Until 1670 there was a chapel of ease there. A church was built at Kington Langley in 1857, and in 1865 a district chapelry was created for the new church, with the same boundaries as the tithing, making it a separate ecclesiastical parish. Today St Michael's church is within the area of the Bybrook Benefice, a group of ten rural churches.

== Other notable buildings ==
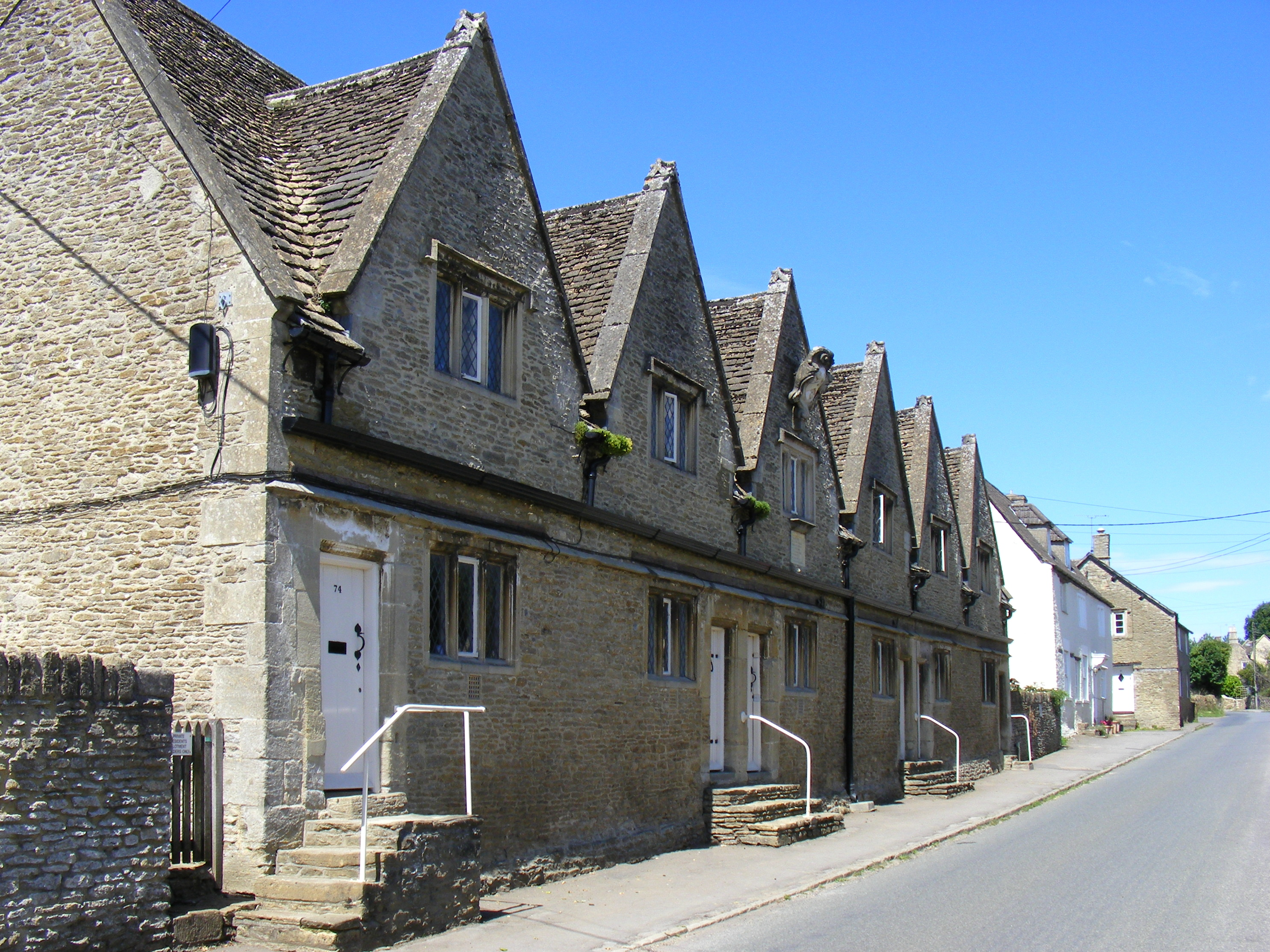
Lyte's almshouses

Priory Manor, a short distance west of the north end of the village, is a Grade II* listed building which incorporates parts of the 13th-century priory. These include the prioress's lodging and guest hall which formed the west side of the cloister, and the refectory from the south side. Work in the 15th, 16th and 17th centuries produced the present L-shaped house. At some point the house became the seat of the Earls of Cottenham; Charles Pepys, 8th Earl (1948–2000) trained event horses there.

Orbach gives a date of 1715 for the former rectory, on Stubbs Lane south-west of the church. The east elevation of the L-shaped building has five bays and is faced with ashlar. Kington Manor, west of the church in its own grounds, was rebuilt in Cotswold style in 1863–4 for Herbert Prodgers, who bought the property in 1862. The architect J. L. Pearson was consulted but it is not clear if the design is his.

Near the south end of the main street, Home Farmhouse is late 17th or early 18th century. Further north, a row of six almshouses was built in 1675 for Isaac Lyte of Easton Piercy.

Manor Farmhouse at Easton Piercy is dated 1631, with restoration and additions of c.1900; the older part is a remnant of a larger manor house which for a time belonged to the Lyte family.

== Amenities ==
Kington St Michael Club was opened in 1923, extended and improved in the late 1980s and underwent renovation in 2003.

Following the closure of the local Post Office in April 2008, there is now a community owned shop, staffed by volunteers, operating from part of the village hall and providing local produce and an off-licence.

The village has a primary school, Kington St Michael Church of England School, a voluntary controlled school with a catchment area that includes the village itself and parts of north Chippenham. It has around 118 pupils and is described by Ofsted in 2014 as "Grade 1 Outstanding". The school was built in 1978 to replace a National School of 1868, which was repurposed as the village hall.

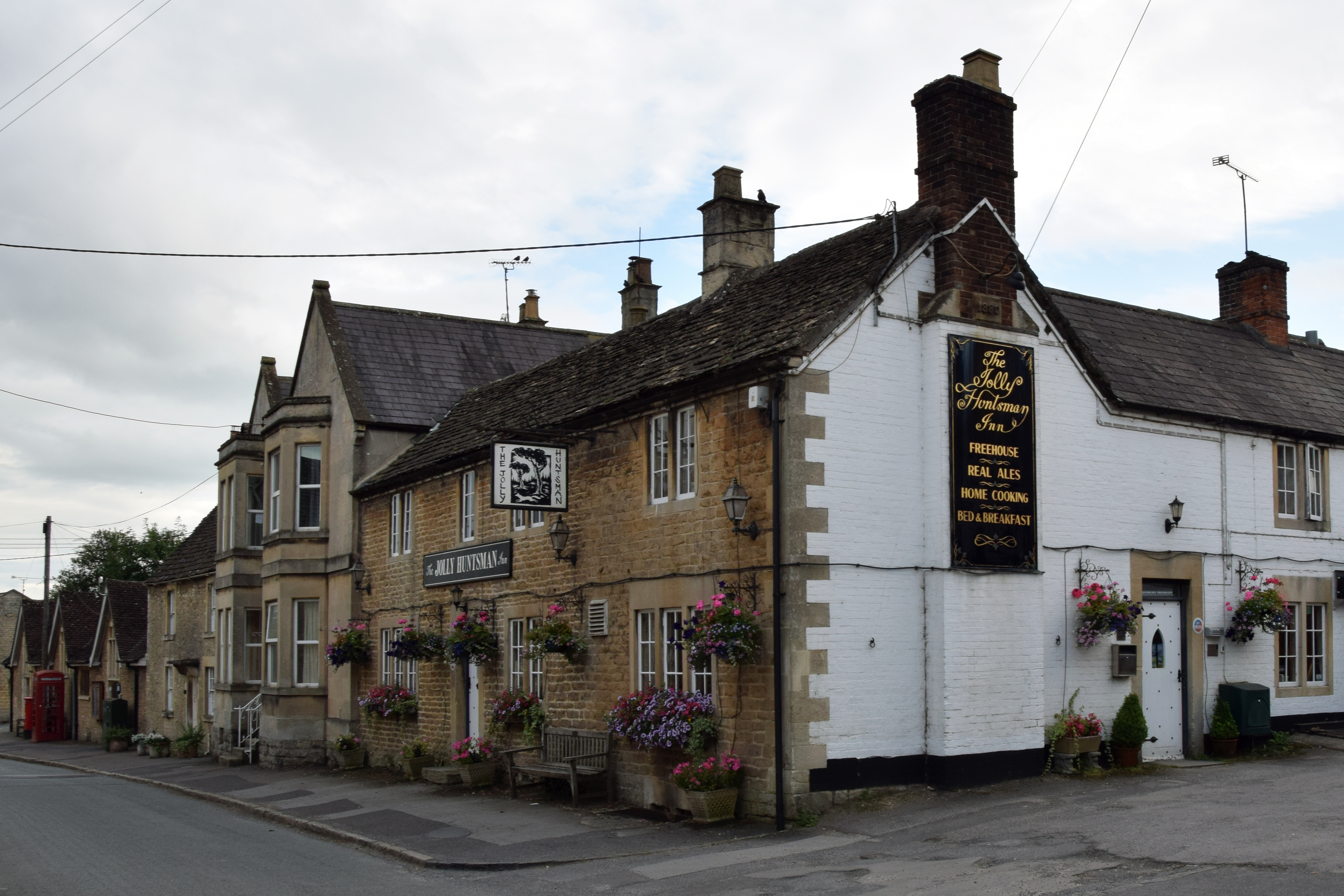
Jolly Huntsman inn, Kington St Michael

The village has a public house, the Jolly Huntsman. It dates back to the 18th century, when beer was brewed on the premises and it was named the White Horse Brewery; it is now a free house. It has been included in the CAMRA Good Beer Guide since 2006 and was named "Regional Pub of the Year" in 2010.

== Notable people ==
- Nicholas Snell (died 1577), landowner and member of parliament (MP), lived at Kington Manor as did his son John (died 1587), also an MP for one session.
- John Aubrey, antiquarian and archaeologist, born at Easton Piercy in 1626
- John Britton, antiquarian, born in the parish in 1771
- Charles Pepys, 8th Earl of Cottenham (1948–2000), cricketer and equestrian, of Priory Manor
- Jeremy Corbyn (born 1949), MP and former leader of the Labour Party, lived in the village up to the age of seven
- Piers Corbyn (born 1947), weather forecaster, older brother of Jeremy, also brought up in the village
