= Basil Peto =

British politician (1862–1945)

- Born: Basil Edward Peto; 13 August 1862; Westminster, London, United Kingdom
- Died: 28 January 1945 (aged 82); Iford Manor, near Bradford on Avon, Wiltshire, United Kingdom
- Education: Harrow School

Sir Basil Edward Peto, 1st Baronet (13 August 1862 – 28 January 1945) was a British businessman and Unionist politician.

== Education and early life ==
Born at Westminster, Peto was the seventh son of Sir Morton Peto, 1st Baronet. He entered Harrow School, but was withdrawn at the age of seventeen when his father experienced financial difficulties.

== Career ==
Peto became an apprentice joiner with his family's business, Peto Brothers, building contractors, of Pimlico. He became a partner in the company in 1884 and married Mary Matilda Annie Baird in 1892. The couple had three sons.

In 1890, Peto attempted to bring in a form of profit-sharing to the company. The proposal was opposed by the trade unions, leading to a strike. The company was dissolved in 1893 and Peto was financially ruined.

He took up employment with Morgan Crucible in 1892, eventually becoming managing director by 1904, when he resigned. He travelled widely for the company supervising the mining and purchase of plumbago in the United States, Canada, India and Ceylon.

Peto was chosen by the Conservative Party to contest the January 1910 general election, regaining the Devizes constituency in Wiltshire which had been lost to the Liberal party in 1906 United Kingdom general election. He retained the seat until the 1918 election.

During the First World War he held a temporary commission in the British Army and acted as the Chief Commissioner for Belgian Refugee Affairs. He was made a Commander of the Order of Leopold by Albert I of Belgium.

Peto returned to the House of Commons, twice serving as Member of Parliament (MP) for the Barnstaple constituency, holding the seat from 1922 to 1923 and again from 1924 to 1935. He was created a Baronet, of Barnstaple in the County of Devon, in January 1927. He found himself at odds with many of the policies of Stanley Baldwin's Conservative government, and lost the party whip to sit as an independent in April 1928.

Following a unanimous vote of confidence in him by his local party executive, he was readmitted to the parliamentary party in November. In June 1934 he announced that he would be retiring from parliament at the next general election, which was held in the following year.

Peto served as chairman of the National Society for the Prevention of Venereal Disease from 1926 – 1939.

== Death ==
Peto died at his home Iford Manor, near Bradford on Avon, Wiltshire in January 1945 aged 82. He was succeeded by his elder son, James Michael Peto (1894–1971). A younger son, Christopher Peto (1897–1980), succeeded his elder brother and also served as MP for Barnstaple.

Parliament of the United Kingdom
Preceded by Francis Rogers	Member of Parliament for Devizes; Jan. 1910–1918	Succeeded by Cory Bell
Preceded by Tudor Rees	Member of Parliament for Barnstaple; 1922–1923	Succeeded by Tudor Rees
Preceded by Tudor Rees	Member of Parliament for Barnstaple; 1924–1935	Succeeded by Sir Richard Acland
Baronetage of the United Kingdom
New creation	Baronet (of Barnstaple); 1927–1945	Succeeded by James Peto
