= Francis Rogers (politician) =

Francis Edward Newman Rogers MP (26 December 1868 – 28 March 1925) was an English Liberal politician, Member of Parliament for Devizes from 1906 to 1910. He was also a member of Wiltshire County Council and a farmer.

== Early life ==
Rogers was the son of Walter Lacy Rogers, of Rainscombe, Pewsey, Wiltshire, and of Hermione Lucy Hamilton, daughter of John James Edward Hamilton and sister of Sir Edward Hamilton, 4th Baronet, of Iping House, Midhurst. He was also a descendant of the jurist Francis James Newman Rogers and was educated at Eton College and Balliol College, Oxford.

== Career ==
As a Liberal parliamentary candidate, Rogers contested Devizes unsuccessfully in 1900 before being elected as its Member of Parliament for the parliament of 1906–1910. Having lost that seat to Basil Peto at the January 1910 general election, he contested Salisbury, again unsuccessfully, in December 1910.

Rogers was also a member of Wiltshire County Council from 1894 to 1911, and a farmer. He was appointed a Justice of the Peace for Wiltshire and a Commissioner of the Board of Agriculture in 1911.

In 1893, Rogers married Louisa Annie, daughter of Edward Jennings of Gellidég, Carmarthenshire, and they had one son and one daughter.

Parliament of the United Kingdom
Preceded by Edward Goulding	Member of Parliament for Devizes; 1906 – January 1910	Succeeded by Basil Peto
