= William Jephson (died 1691) =

English politician (c.1647–1691)

William Jephson (c. 1647 – 7 June 1691) was an English politician.

== Biography ==
The second son of William Jephson of Froyle, Hampshire and Mallow Castle, County Cork, and Alicia Dynham of Boarstall, Buckinghamshire, he was first elected to Parliament for East Grinstead at the general election of October 1679, sitting until 1681. He unsuccessfully stood for Malmesbury in 1685. He served as private secretary to William of Orange from November 1688 to July 1689, and was returned to Parliament for Chipping Wycombe in 1689 and 1690. From April 1689 until his death he was secretary to the Treasury.

In about 1674 Jephson married Mary, daughter of William Lewis of Boarstall and Margaret Banastre, later Duchess of Richmond. On the death of her brother Edward in July 1674 the Jephsons inherited the Boarstall estate. They had one daughter, Frances, who was married in 1716 to Sir John Aubrey, 3rd Baronet. Jephson's widow was remarried successively to Sir John Aubrey, 2nd Baronet, to Sir Charles Kemeys, 3rd Baronet, and to William Aubrey, before dying in 1717.
