= Cory Bell =

British politician

Lieutenant-Colonel William Cory Heward Bell DSO DL (25 October 1875 – 6 February 1961) was a British Army officer from Wiltshire who fought in two wars, and then became a Conservative Party politician. He sat in the House of Commons from 1918 to 1923, and then became a local councillor.

== Life ==
Born at Seend in Wiltshire, Bell was the oldest of the four recorded children of William Heward Bell (1849–1927) and Hannah Taylor Cory (1850–1942). His younger brother Clive (1881–1964) was an art critic associated with the Bloomsbury Group. The family was raised at Cleeve House, Seend, between Melksham and Devizes, a "monstrosity" of a house expanded with a fortune made in the family's coal mines in Merthyr Tydfil. William senior was High Sheriff of Wiltshire in 1912, a director of the Great Western Railway and of Nixon's Navigation Company, and a member of Avon Vale Hunt.

Bell was educated at Westminster School before training at the Royal Military Academy, Woolwich. He was commissioned as a second lieutenant in the Royal Horse Artillery on 2 November 1895, and was promoted to lieutenant on 2 November 1898. Attached to the 87th battery Royal Field Artillery (RFA), he served in the Second Boer War, during which he was promoted to captain on 16 November 1901. Following the end of the war he returned to the United Kingdom on the SS Avoca in September 1902, and was stationed at Newcastle with the battery as part of the 12th Brigade division RFA. He retired from the army in 1911, but rejoined on the outbreak of World War I. He served in France, where he was mentioned in dispatches and was awarded the Distinguished Service Order and the Croix de Guerre.

Bell was elected at the 1918 general election as the Member of Parliament (MP) for the Devizes division of Wiltshire. He was re-elected in 1922, but at the 1923 election he was defeated by the Liberal Party candidate Eric Macfadyen.

After his defeat, Bell did not stand for Parliament again. He became a member of Wiltshire County Council, and served as High Sheriff of Wiltshire in 1932. He became a Deputy Lieutenant of the county in 1952, and also served as a justice of the peace for Wiltshire.

== Personal life ==
In 1903, Bell married Violet Mary Bowley, the daughter of a Royal Engineers officer. They had two children. In 1932, Bell was living at the Old Rectory, Pewsey, Wiltshire.

Bell died in Wiltshire on 6 February 1961.

Parliament of the United Kingdom
Preceded by Basil Peto	Member of Parliament for Devizes; 1918 – 1923	Succeeded by Eric Macfadyen
