= Roger Barbour =

English politician

Roger Barbour (fl. 1415) was an English politician.

He was a member (MP) of the parliament of England for Devizes in 1415.
