= List of mayors of Devizes =

The following persons have been mayors of the town of Devizes, Wiltshire, England.

== Medieval ==
- 1302 John Cray (the first Mayor of Devizes)
- 1376–77 Richard Cardmaker
- 1379–81 Richard Cardmaker
- 1377–79 William Spicer.
- 1381–82 William Spicer
- 1388–89 William Coventre I
- 1391–92 Richard Cardmaker
- 1410 Simon Skinner

== 16th and 17th centuries ==
- 1547-51 Richard Batt
- 1554–55 Thomas Hull
- 1568 Henry Grube
- 1573 Henry Grube
- 1595 John Batt (Also known as John Whittock)
- 1602–03 John Kent
- 1642 Richard Pierce
- 1694–96 John Child

== 20th century ==
- 1902–03 William Rose (Conservative)
- 1907–08 Edward Simpson
- 1988-89 Arthur John Perrett
- 1991–92 Ludmilia Barnett
- 1993–94 Margaret Taylor
- 1994–95 Charles Winchcombe
- 1995–96 I Hopkins
- 1997–98 Ray Taylor
- 1998–99 Jim Thorpe
- 1999–2000 Noel Woolrych

== 21st century ==
- 2000–01 Timothy Price
- 2001-02 Ray Parsons
- 2002–03 Catherine Brown
- 2003–04 Paula Winchcombe
- 2004–05 Margaret Taylor
- 2005–06 Peter Evans
- 2006–07 Donald Jones
- 2007–08 Julian Beinhorn
- 2008–09 Jane Burton
- 2009–10 John Leighton
- 2010–11 Peter Smith
- 2011–12 Sue Evans
- 2012–13 Kelvin Nash
- 2013–14 Peter Smith
- 2014–15 Sarah Bridewell
- 2015–16 Roger Giraud-Saunders
- 2016–17 Jane Burton
- 2017–18 Nigel Carter
- 2019–20 Judy Rose
- 2020–21 Andy Johnson (died in office, May 2020); subsequently Christine Gay as acting mayor
- 2021–22 Christine (Chris) Gay
