= William Hendelove =

English politician

William Hendelove (fl. 1419) was an English politician.

He was a member (MP) of the parliament of England for Devizes in 1419.
