= Henry Bayntun =

Henry Bayntun or Baynton may refer to:

- Henry Bayntun (died 1672) (1621–1672), English MP for Chippenham
- Henry Bayntun (died 1691) (1664–1691), English MP for Chippenham and Calne
- Henry William Bayntun (1766–1840), Royal Navy officer
- Henry Baynton (1892–1951), British actor
- Henry Baynton I (fl. 1572–1593), English politician
- Henry Baynton (died 1616) (1571–1616), English politician
