= Nicholas Snell (died 1577) =

English politician

Nicholas Snell (by 1515 - 1577), of Kington St Michael, Wiltshire, was an English landowner and politician.

He was a Member (MP) of the Parliament of England for Chippenham in 1555, 1559 and 1563; for Wiltshire in 1558; and Malmesbury in 1571 and 1572.

Snell and/or his father, Richard, were employed by the last abbot of Glastonbury. In 1544, Snell bought from the Crown the manor of Kington St Michael, Wiltshire, which had formerly been a grange of the abbey, and he went on to own considerable areas of land in Wiltshire. He was appointed JP in 1554, and around the same time became the steward of William Herbert, 1st Earl of Pembroke. He was High Sheriff of Wiltshire for 1565.

By 1537 he had married Alice, daughter of John Pye, and they had three sons – including John (c.1537–1587), also High Sheriff and briefly an MP – and five daughters. His second marriage was to Mary, daughter of William Clevelood.

Snell died on 31 March 1577.
