= Richard Litelcote =

English politician

Richard Litelcote (fl. 1416), of Wiltshire, was an English politician.

He was a member (MP) of the parliament of England for Devizes in March 1416.
