= Eric Macfadyen =

English colonial administrator (1879–1966)

Sir Eric Macfadyen MP JP
- Macfadyen in 1934

Member of Parliament for Devizes
- In office 6 December 1923 – 9 October 1924
- Preceded by: Cory Bell
- Succeeded by: Percy Hurd

Personal details
- Born: 9 February 1879 Whalley Range, Manchester, England
- Died: 13 July 1966 (aged 87) Hildenborough, Kent, England
- Party: Liberal
- Spouse: Violet Lucy Stanley (m. 1920)
- Children: 6

Sir Eric Macfadyen (9 February 1879 – 13 July 1966) was an English colonial administrator, rubber planter, businessman and developer of tropical agriculture. He was also Liberal Member of Parliament for Devizes in Wiltshire from 1923 to 1924.

== Family and education ==
Eric Macfadyen was born in Whalley Range, Manchester, the son of the Reverend John Macfadyen, a Congregationalist minister, and his wife Elizabeth (née Anderson) who came from Greenock. Macfadyen attended Lynams Preparatory School, also called the Dragon School, in Oxford, from where he won a scholarship to go to Clifton College, Bristol. He later attended Wadham College, Oxford, where he was president of the Union in 1902. In 1920, Macfadyen married Violet Lucy Stanley, daughter of E. H. S. Champneys, of Sellindge, Kent. They had three sons and three daughters.

== Soldier ==
Macfadyen interrupted his university studies to volunteer as a trooper in the 59th Company, the Imperial Yeomanry to serve in the Second Boer War in 1900–01. He was seriously wounded in an accident which left him with a damaged left eyelid, after which he always wore a monocle. As a result of his injuries he was invalided out of the army with the Queen's South Africa Medal and three clasps. During the First World War, he enlisted in the Royal Horse Artillery and served in France in 1917–18, attaining the rank of lieutenant. In World War Two he served in the 21st Battalion of the Home Guard and achieved the rank of captain.

== Career ==
=== Colonial administrator ===
After graduating from Oxford with a second in Greats, and the award of an MA degree, Macfadyen entered the Malayan civil service and served for three years from 1902 to 1905.

=== Planting ===
Macfadyen then went into a partnership obtaining public tenders for road construction to open up new land for agriculture. From there he went into planting and developed significant interests in plantations and the rubber industry which he expanded over the years becoming chairman and director of numerous related companies. He helped establish the United Planters Association and was sometime Chairman of the Planters Association of Malaya. He was Chairman of the Rubber Growers' Association in 1927 and sometime President of the Institution of the Rubber Industry. He was a member of the First Federal Council of the Federated Malay States between 1911–1916 and again from 1919 to 1920. In 1931 and 1941 he served as President of the Association of British Malaya.

=== Tropical agriculture and disease ===
From the 1920s onwards Macfadyen became more involved in supporting scientific research into tropical agriculture and the modernisation and efficiency of plantation management. Macfadyen was a member of the governing body of the Imperial College of Tropical Agriculture, Trinidad, which later became a constituent college of the University of the West Indies, becoming its chairman in 1937. He was knighted in 1943 for services to tropical agriculture. He also served as Chairman of the Ross Institute and Hospital for Tropical diseases, Putney Heath from 1946 to 1958 and was particularly connected to its work to combat malaria.

=== Garden Cities ===
Macfadyen also took an interest in the building of Garden Cities and other aspects of the creation of open, landscaped town planning. He was sometime vice-chairman and later Chairman of First Garden City Ltd, the company formed in 1903 to acquire the land for the building of Letchworth in Hertfordshire. He was active in the work of the Town and Country Planning Association, holding a number of offices in the Association including Hon. Treasurer (1950) and Chairman of the Council (1951–1956).

== Politics ==
Macfadyen was described in his obituary in The Times newspaper as a Liberal of the old school. He was Liberal candidate for Devizes at the 1923 general election winning the seat from the sitting Conservative MP, William Cory Heward Bell, albeit by the narrow majority of 628 votes. He defended the seat at the 1924 general election but was swept away by the Conservative revival which was particularly strong in the rural constituencies. At the 1924 election, the Liberal Party lost all its agricultural seats in England and was reduced, overall, to just 40 Parliamentary seats. Macfadyen tried to regain his seat at the 1929 general election, this time in a three-cornered contest with the Tories and Labour but trailed the Conservative winner by 1,251 votes. He did not stand for Parliament again.

He also served as a Justice of the Peace.

== Death ==
Macfadyen died at his home in Hildenborough near Tonbridge in Kent on 13 July 1966 aged 87 years.

Parliament of the United Kingdom
Preceded by Cory Bell	Member of Parliament for Devizes; 1923 – 1924	Succeeded by Percy Hurd
