= John Delabere =

English politician

John Delabere (before 1559 – 1607), of the Middle Temple, London and Southam, Gloucestershire, was an English politician.

He was a Member (MP) of the Parliament of England for Devizes in 1589.
