= John Peyntour =

Member of the Parliament of England

John Peyntour was a 14th- and 15th-century English politician.

Peyntour was a Member of Parliament for Devizes, Wiltshire in September 1397, 1407 and March 1416.

The first mention of Peyntour was in 1379, when he paid 6d. for the poll tax in Devizes. In the Parliament of 1386, he stood surety for Richard Gobet, and was made principal trustee of the charity known as Gobet's dole. In September 1388, he stood surety for Richard Cardmaker. After this, there is no record of him save which years he was elected in.
