= Thomas Coventre (MP for Devizes) =

English politician

Thomas Coventre (died 1451), of Devizes, Wiltshire, was an English politician.

He was a member (MP) of the parliament of England for Devizes April 1414, November 1414 and 1425.
