= Richard Gobet =

English politician

Richard Gobet (fl. 1382–1390) was an English politician. He was a Member of Parliament for Devizes.

== Life ==
Gobet was married to Agnes. Circa 1388, Gobet bought 20 acres of land in Rowde, two miles from Devizes, and seems to have resided in the area.

== Career ==
He was elected MP for Devizes in May 1382, 1385, 1386 and January 1390. It is unknown when he died, but there is no record of him being alive after 1390.

Parliament of England
Unknown	Member of Parliament for Devizes; 1386; With: William Salter	Succeeded by Richard Cardmaker with William Salter
Parliament of England
Preceded by Richard Cardmaker with William Salter	Member of Parliament for Devizes; 1390; With: William Salter	Unknown
