= Robert Smith (MP for Devizes) =

English politician

Robert Smith (fl. 1414–1421), of Devizes, Wiltshire, was an English politician.

He was a member (MP) of the parliament of England for Devizes in April 1414 and May 1421.
