= John Coventre (MP for Chipping Wycombe) =

Member of the Parliament of England

John Coventre (fl. 1412–1440) of Wycombe, Buckinghamshire, was an English Member of Parliament for Chipping Wycombe in November 1414, 1419, 1422, 1423 and 1427.
