= Henry Leke =

16th-century English politician

Henry Leke (by 1526 – 1558 or later), believed to be of London, was an English politician.

He was a member (MP) of the parliament of England for Lyme Regis in 1547 and for Devizes in April 1554.
