= Edward Heynes =

16th-century English politician

Edward Heynes (by 1524 – 1575 or later), of Devizes, Wiltshire, was an English politician.

He was a member (MP) of the parliament of England for Devizes in November 1554, 1559 and 1563.
