= William Coventre I =

14th-century English politician

William Coventre (fl. 1380s) was an English politician.

Coventre was a member of parliament for Devizes in October 1383 and 1393.

Coventre was Mayor of Devizes in 1388–1389.

Parliament of England
Preceded by ?	Member of Parliament for Devizes; 1383; With: ?	Succeeded by ?
Parliament of England
Preceded by ?	Member of Parliament for Devizes; 1393; With: William Spicer	Succeeded by John Tapener with Richard Brunker
