= Road and Rail Traffic Appeal Tribunal =

Tribunal

The Road and Rail Traffic Appeal Tribunal was appointed under the Road and Rail Traffic Act 1933. The act came into effect on 1 January 1934. The function of the tribunal was to examine road haulage and to establish a licensing procedure for goods vehicles.

The tribunal ceased to exist in 1951. Its responsibilities were taken over by the Transport Tribunal.
