= Thomas Baynton =

English medical writer and surgeon

- Born: October 5, 1761
- Died: August 31, 1820 (aged 58)
- Occupations: Medical writer, surgeon
- Spouse: Ann Swayne
- Children: 7

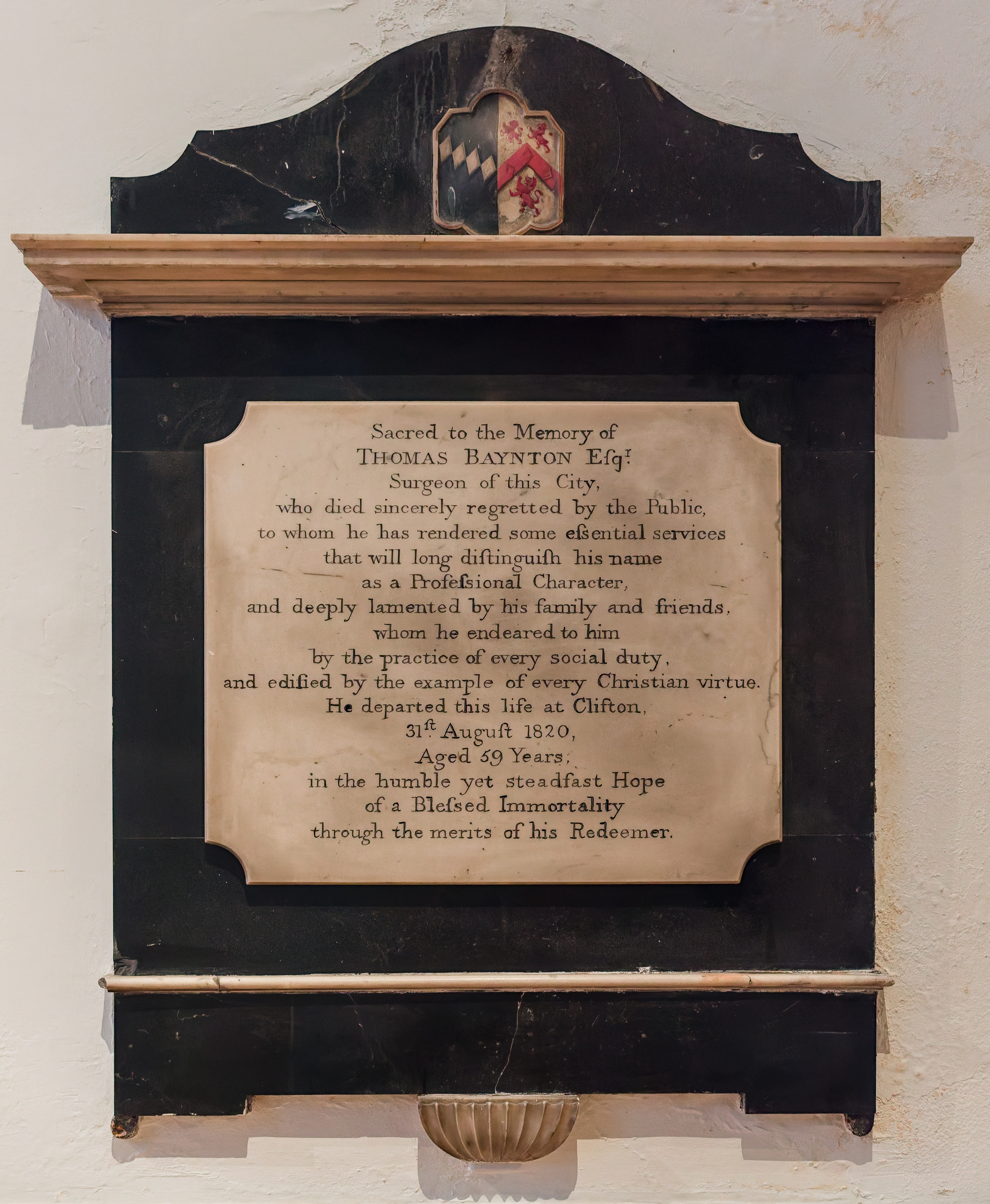
Church monument to Thomas Baynton in St Philip and St Jacob, Bristol

Thomas Baynton (5 October 1761 – 31 August 1820) was an English medical writer and surgeon.

== Career ==
Baynton was from Bristol, where he served his apprenticeship with Mr. Smith, a physician of considerable eminence. He afterwards acquired a large practice of his own, and obtained a high reputation by discoveries in the curative part of his profession, especially in the treatment of ulcers and wounds.

He published Descriptive Account of a New Method of treating Ulcers of the Leg (1797, dedicated to Anthony Fothergill), and An Account of a Successful Method of treating Diseases of the Spine (1813, dedicated to Edward Jenner).

== Personal life ==
Thomas Baynton married Ann Swayne (1762–1846) on 22 May 1784. They had seven children:

- Thomas Baynton (1792 – June 1874) married Jane Dorothy Williams (1814–1890), they had one child:
  - Agnes Elizabeth Baynton (1837 – 4 January 1906).
- Ann Swayne Baynton (1793 – 9 December 1882).
- Elizabeth Baynton (1 March 1796 – ?).
- Mary Baynton (1799 – 4 June 1884) married John Sidney Farrell (21 March 1800 – 17 December 1882) on 7 September 1824 in Powick Worcestershire. They had ten children:
  - Mary Jane Farrell (22 July 1825 – 25 March 1895) married Frederick Lewis David (1831 – 20 February 1879), they had six children.
  - Anne Catherine Frances Farrell (23 July 1826 – 29 January 1892)
  - Isabella Farrell (February 1828 – 10 August 1828)
  - Sidney Baynton Farrell (25 March 1829 – 7 September 1879) married Emily Elizabeth Jarvis (13 April 1827 – 19 August 1912) on 24 June 1854 in Toronto Canada.
  - Adelaide Farrell (13 October 1830 – 12 December 1906)
  - Geraldine Farrell (13 October 1830 – 1 November 1908) married Reginald Onslow Farmer (14 May 1828 – 3 April 1904) in 1851 in Canada. They had seven children including:
    - Mary Frances Farmer (10 August 1857 – 18 May 1929) who married Henry O'Callaghan Prittie (1851–1927) the 4th Baron Dunalley.
  - Frances Farrell (1833 – 24 January 1908)
  - Helen Mackenzie Farrell (1835 – 20 October 1907) married Richard Geaves (1815 – 24 September 1886) they had three children.
  - Henry Chamberlayne Farrell (9 December 1836 – 7 July 1889) married Sophia Margaret Watson Webb (1830 – 1 December 1919), they had five children.
  - Rosa Sophia Farrell (26 February 1842 – 14 May 1897) married William Henry Anthony (9 November 1838 – 5 March 1922) on 28 September 1865 at Lee Kent. They had two children.
- Sarah Baynton (1801–1871) married Percival North Bastard (1784–1848) on 15 August 1822 in Melksham Wiltshire. They had eight children:
  - Emily Bastard (1824 – 17 March 1890)
  - Augusta Bastard (1825 – )
  - Rosa Louisa Bastard (1826–1878) married Edmund George Bankes (24 April 1826 – 28 January 1860) in 1848 in Blandford.
  - Frances Isabella Bastard (1829–1897)
  - Mary Jane Bastard (1834 – )
  - Lucy Bastard (1837 – )
  - Catherine Octavia Bastard (1838 – 17 August 1913)
  - Elizabeth Bastard (1839 – )
- Susan Baynton (1801 – 23 May 1871).
- Frances Jane Baynton (1807–1882) married Robert Forsayth (died 1840). They had one daughter:
  - Frances Jane Forsayth (1839 – 5 September 1899), poet, Arno’s Waters and other poems (1865), The Maria-Stieg and other poems (1873), The Student’s twilight: or, tales in verse (1878).

== Death ==
He died at Clifton on 31 August 1820.
