= John Fauconer =

English politician

John Fauconer (fl. 1421) was an English politician who was a member (MP) of the parliament of England for Devizes in December 1421.
