= Giles Fettiplace =

English politician

Giles Fettiplace (died 1641), of Poulton, Wiltshire, was an English politician.

He was a member (MP) of the parliament of England for Devizes in 1601.
