= George Reynolds (MP for Devizes) =

English politician

George Reynolds (died 1577), of Devizes, Wiltshire, was an English politician.

He was a member (MP) of the parliament of England for Devizes in 1572.
