= John Coventre (MP for Devizes) =

English politician

John Coventre (died c. 1430), of Devizes, Wiltshire, was an English politician.

He was a member (MP) of the parliament of England for Devizes in May 1413, 1420, 1422, 1423, 1426 and 1427.
