= William Kent (MP) =

English estate manager and politician

William Kent (died 1632), of Dinton, Wiltshire; later of Durrington and Boscombe House, East Boscombe, Wiltshire, was an English estate manager and politician.

The son of a Wiltshire gentleman farmer, the proceeds from his employment as an estate manager for the 3rd and 4th earls of Pembroke enabled him to buy East Boscombe manor (with 430 acres at the time of his death) along with other land nearby.

He was a Member (MP) for Devizes in the short-lived Parliament of 1614.

Kent was married in or before 1604. His wife, whose name is not recorded, predeceased him; they had one son, also William (d. 1666).
