= George Johnson (MP for Devizes) =

English politician

George Johnson (1626–1683), of Bowden Park, Lacock, Wiltshire, was an English politician.

He was a reader and treasurer of the Middle Temple and was a judge.

He became a Member (MP) of the Parliament of England for Devizes on 30 October 1669 and 1681.

He was married to Mary Oeils, niece of the famed doctor, Baldwin Hamey the elder. He was the father of author and priest James Johnson and grandfather of James Johnson, Bishop of Gloucester and of Worcester.

Parliament of the United Kingdom
Preceded by John Kent	Member of Parliament for Devizes; 1669–1679	Succeeded by Walter Ernle
Preceded by John Eyles	Member of Parliament for Devizes; 1681–1685	Succeeded by Walter Grubbe
