= Edward Bayntun (died 1593) =

English politician

Edward Bayntun or Baynton (c.1520 – 1593), of Bromham and Rowden, Wiltshire, was an English landowner and politician.

He was sheriff of Wiltshire in 1571, a Member (MP) of the Parliament of England for Wiltshire in 1563, Devizes in 1571 and Calne in 1572.

== Marriages ==
Around the year 1553, Bayntun married Agnes Rhys (died 1574) a daughter of Rhys ap Gruffydd of Carew Castle by his wife Lady Katherine Howard, the daughter of Thomas Howard, 2nd Duke of Norfolk by his second wife Agnes Tilney. Agnes Rhys had been the mistress of William Stourton, 7th Baron Stourton, and thus brought part of the Stourton estates to the marriage. Bayntun's second wife was Anne Pakington (died 1578), daughter of Humphrey Pakington of London (brother of John Pakington and Robert Pakington) and widow of 1) Humphrey Style; 2) Edward Jackman; and 3) James Bacon.
