= Thomas Hull (MP) =

16th-century English politician

Thomas Hull (by 1528 – 1575/76) was an English politician.

== Life ==
Hull was originally a clothier, probably from Devizes. The identity of Hull's wife is unrecorded, but they had five sons and one daughter.

== Career ==
Hull was a member of parliament for Devizes, Wiltshire in 1553, 1554, 1555 and 1558. He was Mayor of Devizes in 1554–1555.
