= John Coventry (instrument maker) =

John Coventry (1735–1812) was an English producer of scientific instruments. He made a reputation through the accuracy of his instruments.

== Life ==
Coventry was born in Southwark. He worked as an assistant to Benjamin Franklin and William Henly on electrical experiments.

He subsequently invented a new hygrometer, more accurate than any which had been previously in use. This instrument was generally employed by chemists and other scientific men of his day. His telescopes were renowned for been accurately adjusted, and the lenses with which they were fitted well ground.
