= Francis Merewether (English politician) =

English politician

Francis Merewether (c. 1674 – 1718), of Bulkington, Keevil, Wiltshire, was an English politician.

He was High Sheriff of Wiltshire for 1699–1700.

He was a member (MP) of the parliament of England for Devizes from February to November 1701 and in the period 3 March 1703 – 1705.
