= Edward Bayntun (died 1657) =

English politician

Sir Edward Bayntun (1593–1657) was an English politician who sat in the House of Commons variously between 1614 and 1653.

Bayntun was the son of Sir Henry Bayntun of Bromham, Wiltshire, and of his wife Lucy Danvers, a daughter of Sir John Danvers of Dauntsey, Wiltshire, and of the famous Elizabeth Neville. He was baptised at Bremhill on 5 September 1593. He matriculated at Christ Church, Oxford, on 27 April 1610, aged 17, and was knighted on 23 October 1613.

Bayntun was elected member of parliament for Devizes in 1614 and as a knight of the shire for Wiltshire in 1621. In 1624 and 1625, he was again elected as Member for Devizes, and in 1626 as Member for Chippenham. He was appointed High Sheriff of Wiltshire for 1637.

In April 1640, Bayntun was elected again for Chippenham to the Short Parliament, and in November of the same year to the Long Parliament. He sat in the Commons until 1653 and in 1648–1649 was a commissioner for the trial of the King but did not act.

Bayntun died in 1657 at the age of 64.

Bayntun married firstly Elizabeth Maynard, daughter of Sir Henry Maynard of Easton, Essex. Their son Edward was also a Wiltshire member of parliament. He married secondly Mary Bowell.

Parliament of England
Preceded by Sir Francis Popham; Sir John Thynne	Member of Parliament for Wiltshire; 1614–1622; With: Sir Francis Seymour	Succeeded by Edward Hungerford; Sir John St John, 1st Baronet
Preceded by Sir Henry Ley; John Kent	Member of Parliament for Devizes; 1624–1625; With: John Kent; Robert Drew	Succeeded by Robert Long; Sir Henry Ley
Preceded by Sir Francis Popham; Sir John Maynard	Member of Parliament for Chippenham; 1626; With: Sir Francis Popham	Succeeded by Sir Francis Popham; Sir John Eyres
Vacant Parliament suspended since 1629	Member of Parliament for Chippenham; 1640–1653; With: Edward Hungerford 1640–1648; William Eyre	Not represented in Barebones Parliament
