= Devizes (constituency) =

Parliament constituency in the United Kingdom, 1885–2024

Coordinates: 51.352°N 1.995°W

- Former county constituency for the House of Commons
- Boundary of Devizes in Wiltshire

- Location of Wiltshire within England
- County: Wiltshire
- Electorate: 68,846 (December 2010)
- Major settlements: Devizes, Marlborough, Durrington, Pewsey

1885–2024
- Seats: One

1331–1885
- Seats: Two until 1868, then One
- Type of constituency: Borough constituency

Devizes /dɪvaɪzɪz/ was a constituency (Note: A county constituency (for the purposes of election expenses and type of returning officer)) in Wiltshire, England, which included four towns and many villages in the middle and east of the county. The seat was held by members of the Conservative Party continuously for a century from 1924.

Further to the completion of the 2023 Periodic Review of Westminster constituencies, the seat was subject to boundary changes which entailed the loss of the town of Devizes to the newly created constituency of Melksham and Devizes. As a consequence, it was renamed East Wiltshire, and first contested under its new name at the 2024 general election.

== History ==
Until 1885 Devizes was a parliamentary borough, electing two Members of Parliament (MPs) by the bloc vote system until the 1868 election, when the Reform Act 1867 reduced its representation to one MP, elected by the first-past-the-post system of election. The Redistribution of Seats Act 1885 abolished the parliamentary borough, and created a new county constituency of the same name, covering a wider area and electing one member. It returned a Conservative MP at every election from 1924, though between the 1950 and 1970 general elections, the seat often had narrow and marginal majorities over the Labour Party.

Its most notable MP was Henry Addington, who held the seat during his term as Prime Minister, as well as when he was Speaker of the House of Commons.

== Boundaries ==
Map of boundaries 2010–2024

1885–1918: The Boroughs of Devizes and Marlborough, the Sessional Divisions of Devizes, Everley, and Marlborough and Ramsbury, and part of the Sessional Division of Pewsey.

1918–1950: The Boroughs of Devizes and Marlborough, the Rural Districts of Devizes, Marlborough, Pewsey, and Ramsbury, and part of the Rural District of Highworth.

1950–1983: The Boroughs of Devizes and Marlborough, and the Rural Districts of Devizes, Highworth, Marlborough and Ramsbury, and Pewsey.

1983–1997: The District of Kennet, and the Borough of Thamesdown wards of Blunsdon, Chiseldon, Covingham, Highworth, Ridgeway, St Margaret, St Philip, and Wroughton.

1997–2010: The District of Kennet, the District of North Wiltshire wards of Calne Abberd, Calne Central, Calne North, Calne North East, Calne South, and Calne Without, and the District of West Wiltshire wards of Blackmore Forest, Melksham Forest, Melksham Lambourne, Melksham Roundpoint, Melksham Town, and Melksham Woodrow.

2010–2024: The District of Kennet, and the District of Salisbury wards of Bulford and Durrington.

The constituency covered Devizes in Wiltshire and the surrounding former Kennet district, which included the towns of Marlborough, Ludgershall and Tidworth, together with the large villages of Bulford, Durrington and Pewsey.

== Members of Parliament ==
=== 1295–1640 ===
Parliament	First member	Second member
1386	Richard Gobet	William Salter
1388 (Feb)	Richard Cardmaker	William Salter
1388 (Sep)	Richard Cardmaker	William Spicer
1390 (Jan)	Richard Gobet	William Spicer
1390 (Nov)		
1391		
1393	William Coventre I	William Spicer
1394	John Tapener	Richard Brunker
1395	Richard Cardmaker	William Spicer
1397 (Jan)	William Salter	Henry Webbe
1397 (Sep)	William Salter	John Peyntour
1399	Richard Cardmaker	William Salter
1401		
1402	Simon Skinner	Richard Smith
1404 (Jan)		
1404 (Oct)		
1406	John Huwet	John Kingston
1407	John Peyntour	Simon Skinner
1410		
1411		
1413 (Feb)		
1413 (May)	John Coventre	Simon Skinner
1414 (Apr)	Thomas Coventre	Robert Smith
1414 (Nov)	William Coventre III	Thomas Coventre
1415	William Coventre III	Roger Barbour
1416 (Mar)	Richard Litelcote	John Peyntour
1416 (Oct)		
1417	William Coventre III	Robert Tyndale
1419	Robert Tyndale	William Hendelove
1420	John Coventre I	Robert Chandler
1421 (May)	William Coventre III	Robert Smith
1421 (Dec)	John Baker	John Fauconer
1425	Robert Chandler	
1429	Robert Chandler	
1442	Henry Long	
1492	Richard Pudsey	
1510–1523	No names known	
1529	John Poyntz	Richard Mytton
1536	?	
1539	?	
1542	?	
1545	Clement Throckmorton	Geoffrey Danielle
1547	Sir George Howard	Nicholas Throckmorton
1553 (Mar)	?	
1553 (Oct)	William Rede	Thomas Hull
1554 (Apr)	Thomas Highgate	Henry Leke
1554 (Nov)	Thomas Hull	Edward Heynes
1555	Thomas Hull	James Webbe
1558	Thomas Hull	Henry Morris
1558	John Young	Edward Heynes
1562–3	Hugh Powell	Edward Heynes
1571	Edward Baynton	William Clerke
1572	George Reynolds, died and replaced 1580 by John Snell	Henry Grube
1584	Edward Baynton I	Henry Brouncker
1586	Edward Baynton I	Henry Brouncker
1588	Henry Brouncker	John Delabere
1593	Henry Baynton I or Henry Baynton II	Richard Mompesson
1597	John Kent	Robert Drew
1601	Giles Fettiplace	Robert Drew
1604	Sir Henry Baynton	Robert Drew
1614	Sir Edward Baynton	William Kent
1621	Sir Henry Ley	John Kent
1624	Edward Bayntun	John Kent
1625	Edward Bayntun	Robert Drew
1626	Robert Long	Sir Henry Ley
1628	Robert Long	Thomas Kent
1629–1640	No Parliaments summoned	

=== 1640–1832 ===
Election	First member	First party	Second member	Second party
March 1640	Edward Bayntun		Henry Danvers	
November 1640	Edward Bayntun		Robert Nicholas	
1653	Devizes not represented in Barebones Parliament			
September 1654	Edward Bayntun		One seat only	
September 1656	Edward Scotton		One seat only	
January 1659	Chaloner Chute jnr		Edward Scotton	
March 1660	William Lewis		Robert Aldworth	
April 1661	William Yorke		John Kent	
December 1666	John Norden		John Kent	
October 1669	Edward Lewis		George Johnson	
April 1675	Sir Edward Bayntun		George Johnson	
February 1679	Sir Edward Bayntun		Sir Walter Ernle	
September 1679	Sir Giles Hungerford		John Eyles	
February 1681	Sir Walter Ernle		George Johnson	
March 1685	John Talbot of Lacock		Walter Grubbe	
January 1689	Sir William Pynsent		Walter Grubbe	
March 1690	Sir Thomas Fowle		Walter Grubbe	
December 1690	John Methuen		Walter Grubbe	
November 1695	John Methuen		Sir Edward Ernle	
July 1698	John Methuen		Sir Francis Child	
January 1701	Francis Merewether		Sir Francis Child	
November 1701	John Methuen		Sir Francis Child	
November 1702	John Methuen		John Child	
March 1703	John Methuen		Francis Merewether	
May 1705	John Methuen		Sir Francis Child	
December 1706	Josiah Diston		Sir Francis Child	
May 1708	Josiah Diston		Paul Methuen	
October 1710	Sir Francis Child		Thomas Richmond Webb	
August 1713	Robert Child		John Nicholas	
January 1715	Josiah Diston		Francis Eyles (expelled)	
February 1721	Josiah Diston		Benjamin Haskins-Stiles	
March 1722	Sir Joseph Eyles	Whig	Benjamin Haskins-Stiles	
August 1727	Francis Eyles	Whig	Benjamin Haskins-Stiles	
April 1734	Francis Eyles	Whig	Sir Joseph Eyles	Whig
February 1740	Francis Eyles	Whig	John Garth	Whig
July 1742	George Lee	Whig	John Garth	Whig
July 1747	William Willy		John Garth	Whig
January 1765	William Willy		Charles Garth	
June 1765	James Sutton		Charles Garth	
September 1780	Sir James Tylney-Long, 7th Bt.		Charles Garth	
November 1780	Sir James Tylney-Long, 7th Bt.		Henry Jones	
April 1784	Sir James Tylney-Long, 7th Bt.	Tory	Henry Addington	Tory
December 1788	Joshua Smith	Tory	Henry Addington	Tory
January 1805	Joshua Smith	Tory	Thomas Grimston Estcourt	Tory
June 1818	John Pearse	Tory	Thomas Grimston Estcourt	Tory
March 1826	John Pearse	Tory	George Watson-Taylor	Tory

=== 1832–1868 ===
Election	First member	First party	Second member	Second party
1832	Wadham Locke	Whig	Montague Gore	Whig
February 1834	Wadham Locke	Whig	Admiral Sir Philip Charles Durham	Tories
December 1834	Wadham Locke	Whig	Admiral Sir Philip Charles Durham	Conservative
November 1835	T. H. S. Sotheron-Estcourt	Conservative	Admiral Sir Philip Charles Durham	Conservative
February 1836	T. H. S. Sotheron-Estcourt	Conservative	James Whitley Deans Dundas	Whig
May 1838	T. H. S. Sotheron-Estcourt	Conservative	George Heneage Walker Heneage	Conservative
February 1844	William Heald Ludlow Bruges	Conservative	George Heneage Walker Heneage	Conservative
February 1848	James Bucknall Bucknall-Estcourt	Conservative	George Heneage Walker Heneage	Conservative
1852	John Neilson Gladstone	Conservative	George Heneage Walker Heneage	Conservative
1857	Simon Watson Taylor	Peelite	Christopher Darby Griffith	Conservative
1859	John Neilson Gladstone	Conservative	Christopher Darby Griffith	Conservative
Feb 1863	William Addington	Conservative	Christopher Darby Griffith	Conservative
Apr 1864	Sir Thomas Bateson, Bt.	Conservative	Christopher Darby Griffith	Conservative
1868	Second Reform Act: representation reduced to one member			

=== Since 1868 ===
Devizes has been a safe Conservative seat since 1945. The last Member of Parliament was Danny Kruger who had been first elected at the 2019 general election, succeeding Claire Perry O'Neill, who stood down at that election after nine years of holding the seat.

Election	Member	Party
1868	Sir Thomas Bateson	Conservative
1885	Walter Long	Conservative
1892	Charles Hobhouse	Liberal
1895	Edward Goulding	Conservative
1906	Francis Rogers	Liberal
1910	Basil Peto	Unionist
1918	Cory Bell	Unionist
1923	Eric Macfadyen	Liberal
1924	Percy Hurd	Conservative
1945	Christopher Hollis	Conservative
1955	Percivall Pott	Conservative
1964 by-election	Charles Morrison	Conservative
1992	Michael Ancram	Conservative
2010	Claire Perry	Conservative
2019	Danny Kruger	Conservative

== Elections ==
=== Elections in the 2010s ===
General election 2019: Devizes
Party	Candidate	Votes	%	±%
Conservative	Danny Kruger	32,150	63.1	+0.4
Liberal Democrats	Jo Waltham	8,157	16.0	+6.7
Labour	Rachael Schneider	7,838	15.4	−5.6
Green	Emma Dawnay	2,809	5.5	+2.3
Majority		23,993	47.1	+5.4
Turnout		50,954	69.4	−1.7
Conservative hold		Swing	−3.15	

General election 2017: Devizes
Party	Candidate	Votes	%	±%
Conservative	Claire Perry	31,744	62.7	+5.0
Labour	Imtiyaz Shaikh	10,608	21.0	+8.0
Liberal Democrats	Chris Coleman	4,706	9.3	+1.2
UKIP	Timothy Page	1,706	3.4	−12.0
Green	Emma Dawnay	1,606	3.2	−2.6
Wessex Regionalists	Jim Gunter	223	0.4	New
Majority		21,136	41.7	−0.6
Turnout		50,593	71.1	+0.3
Conservative hold		Swing	−1.5	

General election 2015: Devizes
Party	Candidate	Votes	%	±%
Conservative	Claire Perry	28,295	57.7	+2.6
UKIP	David Pollitt	7,544	15.4	+10.9
Labour	Chris Watts	6,360	13.0	+2.8
Liberal Democrats	Manda Rigby	3,954	8.1	−18.9
Green	Emma Dawnay	2,853	5.8	+4.0
Majority		20,751	42.3	+14.2
Turnout		49,006	70.8	+2.0
Conservative hold		Swing		

General election 2010: Devizes
Party	Candidate	Votes	%	±%
Conservative	Claire Perry	25,519	55.1	+4.0
Liberal Democrats	Fiona Hornby	12,514	27.0	+4.7
Labour	Junab Ali	4,711	10.2	−12.2
UKIP	Patricia Bryant	2,076	4.5	+0.2
Green	Mark Fletcher	813	1.8	New
Independent	Martin Houlden	566	1.2	New
Libertarian	Nic Coome	141	0.3	New
Majority		13,005	28.1	+4.6
Turnout		46,340	68.8	+3.5
Conservative hold		Swing	−0.3	

=== Elections in the 2000s ===
General election 2005: Devizes
Party	Candidate	Votes	%	±%
Conservative	Michael Ancram	27,253	48.5	+1.3
Liberal Democrats	Fiona Hornby	14,059	25.0	+2.9
Labour	Sharon Charity	12,519	22.3	−2.6
UKIP	Alan Wood	2,315	4.1	+1.2
Majority		13,194	23.5	+1.2
Turnout		56,146	65.2	+1.0
Conservative hold		Swing	−0.8	

General election 2001: Devizes
Party	Candidate	Votes	%	±%
Conservative	Michael Ancram	25,159	47.2	+4.4
Labour	Jim Thorpe	13,263	24.9	+0.7
Liberal Democrats	Helen Frances	11,756	22.1	−4.6
UKIP	Alan Wood	1,521	2.9	+1.9
Independent	Ludovic Kennedy	1,078	2.0	New
Monster Raving Loony	Long Tall Sally Potter	472	0.9	New
Majority		11,896	22.3	+6.0
Turnout		53,249	64.2	−10.5
Conservative hold		Swing		

=== Elections in the 1990s ===
General election 1997: Devizes
Party	Candidate	Votes	%	±%
Conservative	Michael Ancram	25,710	42.8	−11.5
Liberal Democrats	Antony Vickers	15,928	26.5	+0.1
Labour	Frank Jeffrey	14,551	24.2	+3.4
Referendum	John Goldsmith	3,021	5.0	New
UKIP	S. Oram	622	1.0	New
Natural Law	Stephen Haysom	204	0.3	New
Majority		9,782	16.3	−10.6
Turnout		60,036	74.7	−7.0
Conservative hold		Swing		

General election 1992: Devizes
Party	Candidate	Votes	%	±%
Conservative	Michael Ancram	39,090	53.3	−1.5
Liberal Democrats	Jane Mactaggart	19,378	26.4	−1.5
Labour	Rosemary Berry	13,060	17.8	+0.5
Liberal	S. C. Coles	962	1.3	New
Green	David Ripley	808	1.1	New
Majority		19,712	26.9	0.0
Turnout		73,298	81.7	+4.5
Conservative hold		Swing	0.0	

=== Elections in the 1980s ===
General election 1987: Devizes
Party	Candidate	Votes	%	±%
Conservative	Charles Morrison	36,372	54.8	+0.8
Liberal	Linda Siegle	18,542	27.9	−1.0
Labour	Richard Buxton	11,487	17.3	+0.5
Majority		17,830	26.9	+1.8
Turnout		66,401	77.2	+2.2
Conservative hold		Swing	+0.9	

General election 1983: Devizes
Party	Candidate	Votes	%	±%
Conservative	Charles Morrison	33,644	54.0	+3.1
SDP	Elizabeth Palmer	18,020	28.9	+6.8
Labour	David Hulme	10,468	16.8	−6.9
Wessex Regionalists	G. Ewen	234	0.4	+0.2
Majority		15,624	25.1	−0.1
Turnout		62,366	75.0	−4.6
Conservative hold		Swing		

=== Elections in the 1970s ===
General election 1979: Devizes
Party	Candidate	Votes	%	±%
Conservative	Charles Morrison	32,439	50.92	
Labour	V. E. Finlayson	16,351	25.67	
Liberal	Jack Ainslie	14,059	22.07	
Ecology	R. Burcham	713	1.12	New
Wessex Regionalists	A. B. Mockler	142	0.22	New
Majority		16,088	25.25	
Turnout		63,704	79.60	
Conservative hold		Swing		

General election October 1974: Devizes
Party	Candidate	Votes	%	±%
Conservative	Charles Morrison	24,842	42.45	
Labour	V. E. Finlayson	17,821	30.46	
Liberal	Jack Ainslie	15,851	27.09	
Majority		7,021	11.99	
Turnout		58,514	75.22	
Conservative hold		Swing		

General election February 1974: Devizes
Party	Candidate	Votes	%	±%
Conservative	Charles Morrison	27,878	44.53	
Labour	Richard Faulkner	17,980	28.72	
Liberal	J. Crawford	16,753	26.76	
Majority		9,898	15.81	
Turnout		62,611	81.29	
Conservative hold		Swing		

General election 1970: Devizes
Party	Candidate	Votes	%	±%
Conservative	Charles Morrison	28,475	51.65	
Labour	Richard Faulkner	20,442	37.08	
Liberal	John Jones	6,210	11.26	
Majority		8,033	14.57	
Turnout		55,127	76.15	
Conservative hold		Swing		

=== Elections in the 1960s ===
General election 1966: Devizes
Party	Candidate	Votes	%	±%
Conservative	Charles Morrison	21,429	44.65	
Labour	Ian Hamilton	18,832	39.24	
Liberal	Michael Patrick Fogarty	7,730	16.11	
Majority		2,597	5.41	
Turnout		47,991	81.02	
Conservative hold		Swing		

General election 1964: Devizes
Party	Candidate	Votes	%	±%
Conservative	Charles Morrison	21,118	46.75	
Labour	Irving Rogers	17,170	38.01	
Liberal	Michael Patrick Fogarty	6,881	15.23	
Majority		3,948	8.74	
Turnout		45,169	81.37	
Conservative hold		Swing		

1964 Devizes by-election
Party	Candidate	Votes	%	±%
Conservative	Charles Morrison	19,554	46.87	−4.54
Labour	Irving Rogers	17,884	42.87	+1.00
Liberal	Michael Patrick Fogarty	4,281	10.26	New
Majority		1,670	4.00	−5.54
Turnout		41,719		
Conservative hold		Swing		

=== Elections in the 1950s ===
General election 1959: Devizes
Party	Candidate	Votes	%	±%
Conservative	Percivall Pott	20,682	51.41	−1.28
Labour	Wilfrid Edward Cave	16,844	41.87	−5.45
Independent Liberal	Jack Norton	2,707	6.73	New
Majority		3,838	9.54	
Turnout		40,233	79.23	
Conservative hold		Swing		

General election 1955: Devizes
Party	Candidate	Votes	%	±%
Conservative	Percivall Pott	20,317	52.69	+0.77
Labour	Wilfrid Edward Cave	18,242	47.31	−0.67
Majority		2,075	5.38	
Turnout		38,559	78.62	
Conservative hold		Swing		

General election 1951: Devizes
Party	Candidate	Votes	%	±%
Conservative	Christopher Hollis	20,319	52.02	+6.76
Labour	Wilfrid Edward Cave	18,742	47.98	+5.80
Majority		1,577	4.04	
Turnout		39,061	81.41	
Conservative hold		Swing		

General election 1950: Devizes
Party	Candidate	Votes	%	±%
Conservative	Christopher Hollis	17,401	45.26	−1.74
Labour	Wilfrid Edward Cave	16,216	42.18	+12.28
Liberal	Richard William Thomas Aston	4,832	12.57	−10.53
Majority		1,185	3.08	
Turnout		38,449	82.11	
Conservative hold		Swing		

=== Elections in the 1940s ===
General election 1945: Devizes
Party	Candidate	Votes	%	±%
Conservative	Christopher Hollis	12,796	47.0	−12.32
Labour	Wilfrid Edward Cave	8,120	29.9	New
Liberal	Frances Josephy	6,278	23.1	−17.58
Majority		4,676	17.1	−1.5
Turnout		27,194	67.6	−4.6
Conservative hold		Swing		

General election 1939–40: Another general election was required to take place before the end of 1940. The political parties had been making preparations for an election to take place from 1939 and by the end of this year, the following candidates had been selected;

- Conservative: Percy Hurd,
- Liberal: Frances Josephy

=== Elections in the 1930s ===
General election 1935: Devizes
Party	Candidate	Votes	%	±%
Conservative	Percy Hurd	14,438	59.32	
Liberal	Frances Josephy	9,903	40.68	
Majority		4,535	18.64	
Turnout		24,341	72.20	
Conservative hold		Swing		

General election 1931: Devizes
Party	Candidate	Votes	%	±%
Conservative	Percy Hurd	16,702	66.27	
Liberal	Joseph William Molden	8,501	33.73	
Majority		8,201	32.54	
Turnout		25,203	76.20	
Conservative hold		Swing		

=== Elections in the 1920s ===
General election 1929: Devizes
Party	Candidate	Votes	%	±%
Unionist	Percy Hurd	11,979	47.8	−13.1
Liberal	Eric Macfadyen	10,728	42.7	+3.6
Labour	R. P. Sheppard	2,391	9.5	New
Majority		1,251	5.1	−16.7
Turnout		25,098	77.5	+1.3
Registered electors		32,371		
Unionist hold		Swing	−8.4	

General election 1924: Devizes
Party	Candidate	Votes	%	±%
Unionist	Percy Hurd	12,157	60.9	+12.7
Liberal	Eric Macfadyen	7,807	39.1	−12.7
Majority		4,350	21.8	N/A
Turnout		19,964	76.2	+6.7
Registered electors		26,195		
Unionist gain from Liberal		Swing	+12.7	

General election 1923: Devizes
Party	Candidate	Votes	%	±%
Liberal	Eric Macfadyen	9,202	51.8	+11.1
Unionist	Cory Bell	8,574	48.2	−11.1
Majority		628	3.6	N/A
Turnout		17,776	69.5	+4.6
Registered electors		25,588		
Liberal gain from Unionist		Swing	+11.1	

Currie

General election 1922: Devizes
Party	Candidate	Votes	%	±%
Unionist	Cory Bell	9,598	59.3	−4.5
Liberal	Hilda Beatrice Currie	6,576	40.7	+4.5
Majority		3,020	18.6	−9.0
Turnout		16,174	64.9	+11.8
Registered electors		24,937		
Unionist hold		Swing	−4.5	

=== Elections in the 1910s ===
General election 1918: Devizes
Party		Candidate	Votes	%	±%
C	Unionist	Cory Bell	8,512	63.8	+9.2
	Liberal	James Currie	4,823	36.2	−9.2
Majority			3,689	27.6	+18.4
Turnout			13,335	53.1	−34.0
Registered electors			25,091		
	Unionist hold		Swing	+9.2	
C indicates candidate endorsed by the coalition government.

== Election results 1885–1918 ==
=== Elections in the 1880s ===
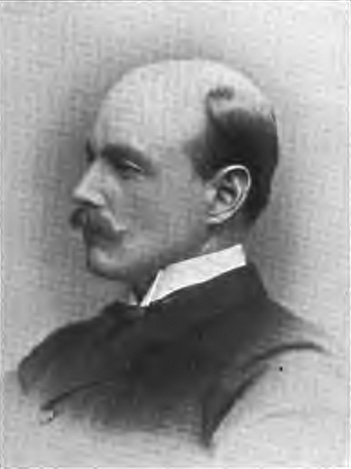
Long

General election 1885: Devizes
Party	Candidate	Votes	%	±%
Conservative	Walter Long	3,849	50.6	−2.9
Liberal	William Barber	3,752	49.4	+2.9
Majority		97	1.2	−5.8
Turnout		7,601	81.2	−10.1
Registered electors		9,357		
Conservative hold		Swing	−2.9	

Philipps

General election 1886: Devizes
Party	Candidate	Votes	%	±%
Conservative	Walter Long	4,123	63.2	+12.6
Liberal	John Philipps	2,397	36.8	−12.6
Majority		1,726	26.4	+25.2
Turnout		6,520	69.7	−11.5
Registered electors		9,357		
Conservative hold		Swing	+12.6	

=== Elections in the 1890s ===
Hobhouse

General election 1892: Devizes
Party	Candidate	Votes	%	±%
Liberal	Charles Hobhouse	3,896	50.9	+14.1
Conservative	Walter Long	3,758	49.1	−14.1
Majority		138	1.8	N/A
Turnout		7,654	76.6	+6.9
Registered electors		9,987		
Liberal gain from Conservative		Swing	+14.1	

Goulding

General election 1895: Devizes
Party	Candidate	Votes	%	±%
Conservative	Edward Goulding	4,114	53.1	+4.0
Liberal	Charles Hobhouse	3,637	46.9	−4.0
Majority		477	6.2	N/A
Turnout		7,751	84.7	+8.1
Registered electors		9,156		
Conservative gain from Liberal		Swing	+4.0	

=== Elections in the 1900s ===
General election 1900: Devizes
Party	Candidate	Votes	%	±%
Conservative	Edward Goulding	3,738	54.6	+1.5
Liberal	Francis Rogers	3,111	45.4	−1.5
Majority		627	9.2	+3.0
Turnout		6,849	77.8	−6.9
Registered electors		8,807		
Conservative hold		Swing	+1.5	

General election 1906: Devizes
Party	Candidate	Votes	%	±%
Liberal	Francis Rogers	4,247	53.9	+8.5
Conservative	Godfrey Dalrymple-White	3,633	46.1	−8.5
Majority		614	7.8	N/A
Turnout		7,880	87.7	+9.9
Registered electors		8,988		
Liberal gain from Conservative		Swing	+8.5	

=== Elections in the 1910s ===
General election January 1910: Devizes
Party	Candidate	Votes	%	±%
Conservative	Basil Peto	4,709	55.7	+9.6
Liberal	Francis Rogers	3,742	44.3	−9.6
Majority		967	11.4	N/A
Turnout		8,451	91.1	+3.4
Registered electors		9,277		
Conservative gain from Liberal		Swing	+9.6	

Pocock

General election December 1910: Devizes
Party	Candidate	Votes	%	±%
Conservative	Basil Peto	4,408	54.6	−1.1
Liberal	Sidney Job Pocock	3,670	45.4	+1.1
Majority		738	9.2	−2.2
Turnout		8,078	87.1	−4.0
Registered electors		9,277		
Conservative hold		Swing	−1.1	

General election 1914–15:

Another general election was required to take place before the end of 1915. The political parties had been making preparations for an election to take place and by July 1914, the following candidates had been selected;

- Unionist: Basil Peto
- Liberal: James Currie

== Election results 1868–1880 ==
=== Elections in the 1860s ===
Seat reduced to one member

General election 1868: Devizes
Party	Candidate	Votes	%	±%
Conservative	Thomas Bateson	385	52.0	−2.4
Liberal	John Webb Probyn	321	43.4	+43.4
Conservative	Christopher Darby Griffith	34	4.6	−41.0
Majority		64	8.6	−37.0
Turnout		740	86.2	+39.8
Registered electors		858		
Conservative hold		Swing	−22.9	

=== Elections in the 1870s ===
General election 1874: Devizes
Party	Candidate	Votes	%	±%
Conservative	Thomas Bateson	396	52.0	±0.0
Conservative	Christopher Darby Griffith	364	47.8	+43.2
Ind. Conservative	Sidney Fitzroy Kelly Sloper	2	0.3	New
Majority		32	4.2	−4.4
Turnout		762	84.5	−1.7
Registered electors		902		
Conservative hold		Swing		

=== Elections in the 1880s ===
General election 1880: Devizes
Party	Candidate	Votes	%	±%
Conservative	Thomas Bateson	446	53.5	+1.5
Liberal	Albert Meysey-Thompson	388	46.5	New
Majority		58	7.0	+2.8
Turnout		834	91.3	+6.8
Registered electors		913		
Conservative hold		Swing		

== Election results 1832–1868 ==
General election 1832: Devizes
Party	Candidate	Votes	%	±%
Whig	Wadham Locke	216	45.4	New
Whig	Montague Gore	166	34.9	New
Tory	Philip Charles Durham	94	19.7	N/A
Majority		72	15.2	N/A
Turnout		276	87.6	N/A
Registered electors		315		
Whig gain from Tory		Swing	N/A	
Whig gain from Tory		Swing	N/A	

Gore resigned after defecting to the Tories, causing a by-election.

By-election, 17 February 1834: Devizes
Party	Candidate	Votes	%	±%
Tory	Philip Charles Durham	Unopposed		
Tory gain from Whig				

General election 1835: Devizes
Party	Candidate	Votes	%	±%
Whig	Wadham Locke	240	49.0	+3.6
Conservative	Philip Charles Durham	154	31.4	+11.7
Whig	Philip Pleydell-Bouverie	96	19.6	−15.3
Turnout		260	83.6	−4.0
Registered electors		311		
Majority		86	17.6	+2.4
Whig hold		Swing	−1.1	
Majority		58	11.8	N/A
Conservative gain from Whig		Swing	+11.7	

Locke's death caused a by-election.

By-election, 25 November 1835: Devizes
Party	Candidate	Votes	%	±%
Conservative	T. H. S. Bucknall-Estcourt	157	52.0	+20.6
Whig	James Whitley Deans Dundas	145	48.0	−20.6
Majority		12	4.0	−7.8
Turnout		302	88.0	+4.4
Registered electors		343		
Conservative gain from Whig		Swing	+20.6	

Durham resigned, causing a by-election.

By-election, 10 February 1836: Devizes
Party	Candidate	Votes	%	±%
Whig	James Whitley Deans Dundas	Unopposed		
Whig gain from Conservative				

General election 1837: Devizes
Party	Candidate	Votes	%	±%
Whig	James Whitley Deans Dundas	Unopposed		
Conservative	T. H. S. Bucknall-Estcourt	Unopposed		
Registered electors		341		
Whig hold				
Conservative hold				

Dundas was appointed as Clerk of the Ordnance, requiring a by-election.

By-election, 26 March 1838: Devizes
Party	Candidate	Votes	%	±%
Whig	James Whitley Deans Dundas	109	51.7	N/A
Conservative	George Heneage Walker Heneage	102	48.3	N/A
Majority		7	3.4	N/A
Turnout		211	79.3	N/A
Registered electors		266		
Whig hold		Swing	N/A	

- Following the by-election, Dundas was unseated due to bribery and Heneage was declared elected in his place

=== Elections in the 1840s ===
General election 1841: Devizes
Party	Candidate	Votes	%	±%
Conservative	George Heneage Walker Heneage	Unopposed		
Conservative	Thomas Sotheron	Unopposed		
Registered electors		375		
Conservative hold				
Conservative gain from Whig				

Sotheron resigned, by accepting the office of Steward of the Chiltern Hundreds, in order to contest a by-election at North Wiltshire, causing a by-election.

By-election, 7 February 1844: Devizes
Party	Candidate	Votes	%	±%
Conservative	William Heald Ludlow Bruges	202	75.1	N/A
Whig	Christopher Temple	67	24.9	New
Majority		135	50.2	N/A
Turnout		269	69.9	N/A
Registered electors		385		
Conservative hold		Swing	N/A	

General election 1847: Devizes
Party	Candidate	Votes	%	±%
Conservative	George Heneage Walker Heneage	Unopposed		
Conservative	William Heald Ludlow Bruges	Unopposed		
Registered electors		389		
Conservative hold				
Conservative hold				

Bruges resigned by accepting the office of Steward of the Chiltern Hundreds, causing a by-election.

By-election, 25 February 1848: Devizes
Party	Candidate	Votes	%	±%
Conservative	James Bucknall Bucknall Estcourt	Unopposed		
Conservative hold				

=== Elections in the 1850s ===
General election 1852: Devizes
Party	Candidate	Votes	%	±%
Conservative	John Neilson Gladstone	Unopposed		
Conservative	George Heneage Walker Heneage	Unopposed		
Registered electors		373		
Conservative hold				
Conservative hold				

General election 1857: Devizes
Party	Candidate	Votes	%	±%
Peelite	Simon Watson Taylor	230	45.4	N/A
Conservative	Christopher Darby Griffith	159	31.4	N/A
Conservative	John Neilson Gladstone	118	23.3	N/A
Majority		71	22.1	N/A
Turnout		254 (est)	79.5 (est)	N/A
Registered electors		319		
Peelite gain from Conservative		Swing	N/A	
Conservative hold		Swing	N/A	

General election 1859: Devizes
Party	Candidate	Votes	%	±%
Conservative	John Neilson Gladstone	171	35.2	+11.9
Conservative	Christopher Darby Griffith	167	34.4	+3.0
Liberal	Simon Watson Taylor	148	30.5	−14.9
Majority		19	4.7	N/A
Turnout		243 (est)	77.4 (est)	−2.1
Registered electors		314		
Conservative hold		Swing	+9.7	
Conservative gain from Peelite		Swing	+5.2	

=== Elections in the 1860s ===
Gladstone's death caused a by-election.

By-election, 18 February 1863: Devizes
Party	Candidate	Votes	%	±%
Conservative	William Addington	170	64.4	−5.2
Liberal	John Webb Probyn	88	33.3	N/A
Liberal	Israel Abrahams	6	2.3	N/A
Majority		82	31.1	+26.4
Turnout		264	79.8	+2.4
Registered electors		331		
Conservative hold		Swing	N/A	

Addington succeeded to the peerage, causing a by-election.

By-election, 18 April 1864: Devizes
Party	Candidate	Votes	%	±%
Conservative	Thomas Bateson	Unopposed		
Conservative hold				

General election 1865: Devizes
Party	Candidate	Votes	%	±%
Conservative	Thomas Bateson	181	54.4	+19.2
Conservative	Christopher Darby Griffith	152	45.6	+11.2
Liberal	John Curling	0	0.0	−30.5
Majority		152	45.6	+40.9
Turnout		167 (est)	46.4 (est)	−31.0
Registered electors		359		
Conservative hold		Swing	+17.2	
Conservative gain from Liberal		Swing	+13.2	

- Curling retired before polling day.

== Election results before 1832 ==
General election 1831: Devizes
Party	Candidate	Votes	%	±%
Tory	John Pearse	Unopposed		
Tory	George Watson-Taylor	Unopposed		
Registered electors		c. 36		
Tory hold				
Tory hold				

General election 1830: Devizes
Party	Candidate	Votes	%	±%
Tory	John Pearse			
Tory	George Watson-Taylor			
Tory	William Salmon			
Whig	Wadham Locke			
Turnout		30	c. 83.3	N/A
Registered electors		c. 36		
Tory hold				
Tory hold				

- Some sources, including the corporation minutes, do not list Locke or Salmon as candidates. However, they are included here as per Stooks Smith.

== See also ==
- List of parliamentary constituencies in Wiltshire

== Notes ==
Parliament of the United Kingdom
Preceded by Cambridge University	Constituency represented by the prime minister 1801–1804	Succeeded by Cambridge University
