= Robert Nicholas (judge) =

English Member of Parliament and judge

Robert Nicholas (1595–1667) was a judge and an English Member of Parliament who supported the Parliamentary cause in the English Civil War.

Nicholas was elected Member of Parliament (M.P.) for Devizes for the Long Parliament in November 1640. He assisted in prosecuting Archbishop Laud in 1643. In 1648 he became Serjeant-at-law and in 1649 judge of the upper bench. He was Baron of the Exchequer in 1655.

Nicholas was not exempted from the general pardon at the restoration of the monarchy in 1660. He was commissioner for raising money in Wiltshire in 1660.
