= Henry Baynton (died 1616) =

English politician

Sir Henry Baynton or Bayntun (c. 1571 – 24 September 1616) was an English politician.

He was the oldest surviving son of Edward Bayntun of Bromham, Wiltshire and his wife, Agnes, the daughter of Sir Griffith Rhys of Carew Castle, Pembrokeshire. He was educated in the law at Lincoln's Inn (1588). He succeeded his father in 1593, inheriting Bromham House, and was knighted in 1601.

He was a Member (MP) of the Parliament of England for Chippenham in 1589, Devizes in 1593 and 1604, and Wiltshire in 1597.

He was appointed High Sheriff of Wiltshire for 1601–02 and deputy lieutenant of the county by 1609 until at least 1611.

== Marriage ==
He married Lucy, the daughter of Sir John Danvers of Dauntsey, Wiltshire; they had a son and a daughter. He was succeeded by his son Edward.
