= William Spicer (14th-century MP) =

English politician

William Spicer (fl. 1362–1395) was an English politician.

Spicer was Mayor of Devizes in 1377–1379 and 1381–1382.

He was Member of Parliament for Devizes, Wiltshire in 1362, February 1383, September 1388, January 1390, 1393 and 1395.
