= Christopher Darby Griffith =

British politician

Christopher Darby Griffith (1804–1885) was a British politician.

He was a Member of the Parliament of the United Kingdom for Devizes 1857–1868.
