= John Kent (will proven 1669) =

English politician

John Kent (c. 1612 – will proven 1669), of the Market Place, Devizes, Wiltshire, was an English politician.

He was a member (MP) of the parliament of England for Devizes from 1661 to August 1669.
