= Simon Skinner =

English politician

Simon Skinner (died 1417) was an English politician.

== Career ==
Skinner was Member of Parliament for Devizes in 1402, 1407 and May 1413. He was Mayor of Devizes in 1410.

== Death ==
In his will, he asked to be buried in Chew Magna near Bristol. However, he lived in Devizes, Wiltshire. He was survived by his widow, Isabel, and his son, Robert.
