= Richard Cardmaker =

14th-century English politician

Richard Cardmaker (fl. 1376–1399) was an English politician.

== Career ==
Cardmaker was the Mayor of Devizes in 1376–77, 1379–81 and 1391–92.

He was Member of Parliament for Devizes October 1383, November 1384, February 1388, September 1388, 1395 and 1399.
