= Pynsent =

Pynsent is a surname. Notable people with the surname include:

- William Pynsent (disambiguation), multiple people
- Pynsent baronets, County of Wiltshire, England
