= William Pynsent =

William Pynsent may refer to:

- Sir William Pynsent, 1st Baronet (1642–1719), MP for Devizes, 1689
- Sir William Pynsent, 2nd Baronet (c. 1679–1765), MP for Taunton, 1715–1722
