= Burton Pynsent Monument =

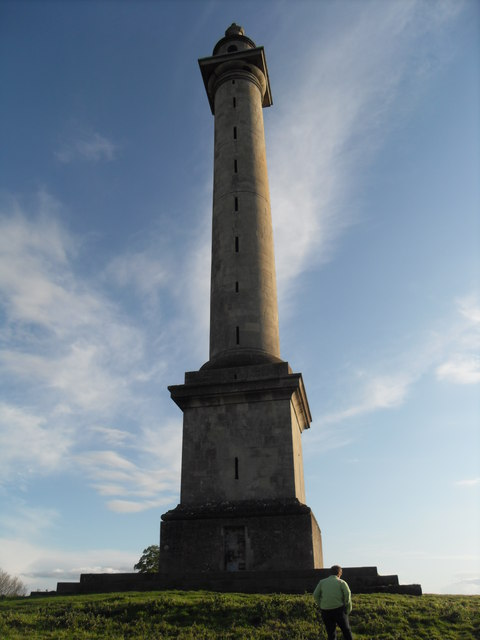

- Location within Somerset
- 51°01′18″N 2°53′21″W
- Location: Curry Rivel, Somerset, England

History
- Built: 1767

Listed Building – Grade I
- Official name: Burton Pynsent Monument at NGR St 3768 2517
- Designated: 17 April 1959
- Reference no.: 1039561

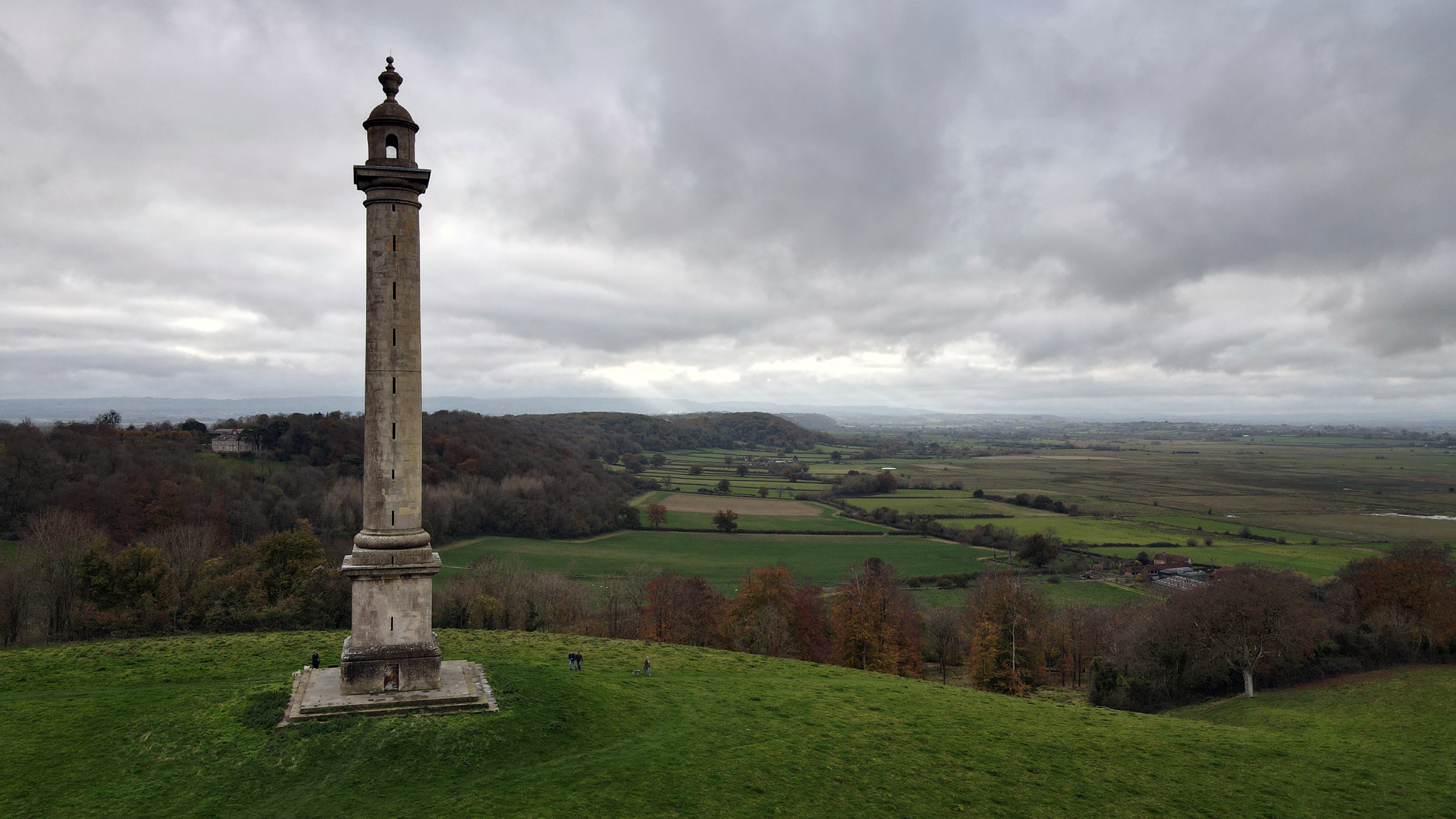
Aerial view of Burton Monument

The 140 feet (43 m) Burton Pynsent Monument on Troy Hill at Burton Pynsent, within the parish of Curry Rivel, Somerset, England, was built in 1767 and has been designated as a Grade I listed building.

Alternative names for the tower, which stands on Troy Hill, a spur of high ground about 700 m north-east of Burton Pynsent House, include the Curry Rivel Column, Pynsent Column, Pynsent Steeple or Cider Monument.

The monument, which is clad in Portland stone, was designed by Capability Brown and built by Philip Pear, at a cost of £2,000, for William Pitt as a monument to Sir William Pynsent, of the Pynsent Baronets.

There is a legend that Pynsent was grateful to Pitt for opposing a ten shilling tax on a hogshead of cider (1763 Cider Bill), which would have affected his business, so on his death he left his entire estate to Pitt. However, Pynsent signed his will before the Cider Tax was ever proposed. Pitt certainly opposed the tax, but that was because the legislation would have allowed the Revenue men to enter people's homes to check whether cider was being made, and he believed that an Englishman's home is his castle and no-one should enter uninvited. Pitt then used some of the income from the estate (£3000 per annum) to erect the monument to his benefactor.

In June 1948 it was reported that a heifer climbed the 172 steps to the top of the monument, but was later returned safely to her hillside pasture.

The tower was restored in the 1990s by the John Paul Getty Trust and English Heritage.

== See also ==
- List of Grade I listed buildings in South Somerset
- 1763 Cider Bill
