= Urchfont Manor =

Manor house in Wiltshire, England

Coordinates: 51°18′42″N 01°57′00″W

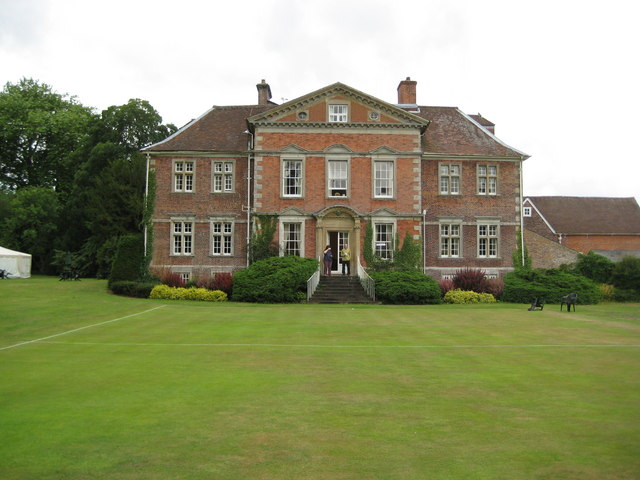
Urchfont Manor in 2009

Urchfont Manor is a manor house near the village of Urchfont in Wiltshire, England, about 3 1/2 miles (6 km) southeast of the market town of Devizes.

Originally a private residence, Urchfont Manor was used to house evacuated children during the Second World War. From 1947 the building was used as a residential college for adult education and a conference centre, and since 2013 has again been a private country house.

== History ==
A 15th-century house was rebuilt between 1678 and 1700 by Sir William Pynsent, 1st Baronet, Member of Parliament for Devizes. His son Sir William Pynsent, 2nd Baronet died without an heir in 1765 and left his estates in Somerset and Wiltshire to William Pitt the Elder, in gratitude for Pitt's opposition to a new tax of ten shillings on each hogshead of cider. Pitt kept the Somerset estates at Burton Pynsent but sold his new property at Urchfont to the third Duke of Queensberry, and the house was then occupied by tenants until it was bought by Simon Watson Taylor in 1843. Around this time, the name of the property changed from Urchfont House to Urchfont Manor.

Watson Taylor, who had other estates elsewhere in Wiltshire, was also briefly a member of parliament for Devizes in the 1850s; he lived at the house from about 1850 to 1862 and carried out internal rearrangements, including moving the entrance of the house. In 1928, his heirs sold the house and what remained of its farmland to Hamilton Rivers Pollock (1884–1941), a barrister who lived there until his death. For the rest of the Second World War, Urchfont Manor was a home for children evacuated from London.

=== College ===
In 1945, the house and about 100 acres of land were bought by Wiltshire County Council to establish an adult education centre, which opened in 1947. The courses offered were mainly in visual and performing arts and media, either as day courses, short residential stays or summer schools. Some programmes were City & Guilds accredited, and some Open University short courses were offered. In its final years, more than one thousand students were enrolled at any time. Some courses were provided directly by the Local Education Authority and some by partners such as the Workers Educational Association or by other agencies, some within the voluntary sector.

The college was managed by a Management Board of governors, most appointed by Wiltshire County Council (later Wiltshire Council) as Local Education Authority, plus the Director of the college, one elected representative of the teaching staff, and a student member. The college closed in September 2012 and in 2013 it was sold to be used as a private house, at a price of £2.7 million.

== Architecture ==
The two-storey house is built in brick with stone dressings, in the Restoration style. Professor Mick Aston described it as a notable example of Flemish bond in the Channel 4 programme Time Team. The east front has seven bays, the middle three brought forward under a pediment with attic windows; the central doorway with a curved pediment is of c.1680 and is called "splendidly ornate" by Orbach. There is a large 16th-century fireplace from the earlier house, and a fine 17th-century open-well staircase.

== Designations ==
The house was designated as Grade II* listed in 1962, and the long brick garden walls to the east were listed at Grade II in 1988.
