= Chatham Vase =

1781 stone sculpture by John Bacon

Coordinates: 51.2960°N 0.1347°E

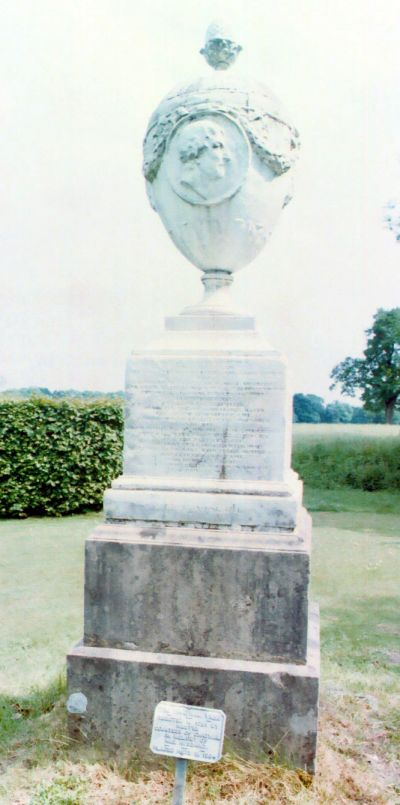

The Chatham Vase is a stone sculpture by John Bacon commissioned as a memorial to William Pitt the Elder by his wife, Hester, Countess of Chatham. It was originally erected at their house in Burton Pynsent in 1781. It was subsequently moved to Stowe House but sold in 1848, then purchased in 1857 by a member of the family and installed at Revesby Abbey. It was moved to the grounds of Chevening House in 1934, where it currently resides. It is currently grade II listed.

== Pedestal inscription ==
The inscription on the pedestal reads:

Sacred to pure affection
This simple urn
Stands a witness of unceasing grief for him who
Excelling in whatever is so admirable
and adding to the exercise of the sublimest virtues
The sweet charm of refined sentiment and polished wit
By gay social commerce
Rendered beyond comparison happy
The course of domestic life
and bestowed a felicity inexpressible on her
Whose faithful love was blessed in a pure return
That raised her above every other joy but the parental one
and that still shared with him
His generous country with public monuments has eternised his fame
This humble tribute is but to soothe the sorrowing breast of private woe
