= St Andrew's Church, Curry Rivel =

Church in Somerset, England

Church of St Andrew
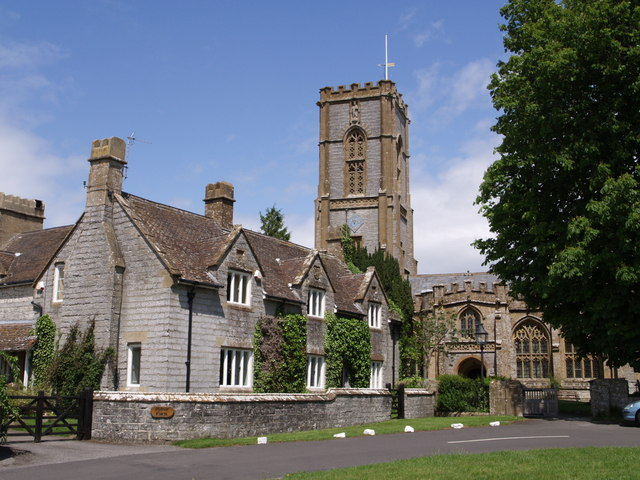
- Church and Manor Farmhouse

- Location within Somerset
- 51°01′29″N 2°52′04″W
- Location: Curry Rivel, Somerset, England

History
- Built: 13th century

Listed Building – Grade I
- Official name: Church of St Andrew
- Designated: 17 April 1959
- Reference no.: 1249281

The Church of St Andrew in Curry Rivel, Somerset, England dates from the 13th century and is designated as a Grade I listed building. It was included in Simon Jenkins England's Thousand Best Churches.

The oldest part of the church is the north chapel which is Norman, however there may have been an earlier Saxon church on the same site. Most of the church is from the 15th century. An earlier tower was demolished and rebuilt in 1861 when the interior was also refashioned. Within the tower are eight bells, the oldest of which is from 1510.

The interior includes several 13th-century monuments and a parclose screen.

The Anglican parish is within the benefice of Curry Rivel with Fivehead and Swell, within the Taunton archdeaconry.

== See also ==
- List of Grade I listed buildings in South Somerset
- List of towers in Somerset
- List of ecclesiastical parishes in the Diocese of Bath and Wells
