= Pinsent baronets =

Baronetcy in the Baronetage of the United Kingdom

The Pinsent Baronetcy, of Selly Hill in the City of Birmingham, is a title in the Baronetage of the United Kingdom. It was created on 3 February 1938 for Richard Pinsent, President of the Law Society from 1918 to 1919 and founding partner of Pinsent & Co, a predecessor firm of Pinsent Masons. Rower and Olympic gold medallist Sir Matthew Pinsent is the grandson of Clive Pinsent, younger son of the first Baronet.

== Pinsent baronets, of Selly Hill (1938) ==
- Sir Richard Alfred Pinsent, 1st Baronet (1852–1948)
- Sir Roy Pinsent, 2nd Baronet (1883–1978)
- Sir Christopher Roy Pinsent, 3rd Baronet (1922–2015)
- Sir Thomas Benjamin Roy Pinsent, 4th Baronet (born 1967)

The heir presumptive is the current holder's cousin, William Ross Pinsent (born 1955), grandson of the second baronet.

== See also ==
- Pynsent baronets
