= Sir William Pynsent, 2nd Baronet =

British landowner and politician

Sir William Pynsent, 2nd Baronet (c. 1679–1765) was a British landowner and politician who sat in the House of Commons from 1715 to 1722. He is commemorated by a tall monument at Curry Rivel, Somerset erected by William Pitt the Elder, to whom he left his entire fortune.

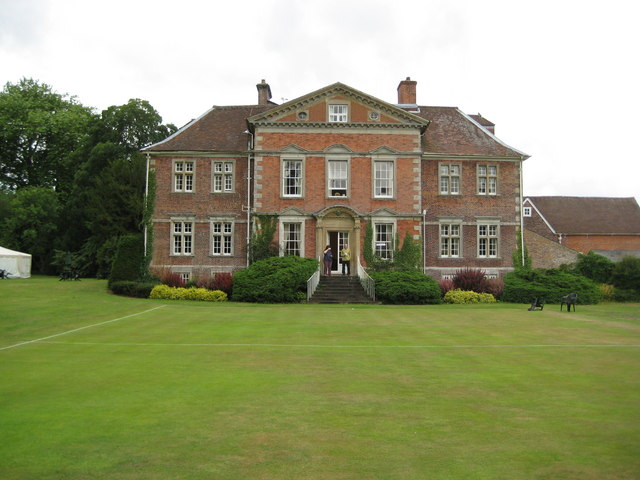
Urchfont Manor in 2009

Pynsent was the eldest son of Sir William Pynsent, 1st Baronet MP of Urchfont, Wiltshire, and his wife Patience Bond, daughter of John Bond, alderman of London. He married Mary Star, widow of Edmund Star of New Court, and daughter of Thomas Jennings of Burton, Somerset. He succeeded his father in the baronetcy on the death of his father in 1719.

Pynsent acquired an estate at Burton through his wife, and after the general election of 1715 was returned on petition as a Whig Member of Parliament for Taunton on 30 August 1715. He voted for the septennial bill and the repeal of the Occasional Conformity and Schism Acts. He did not vote on the Peerage Bill, and thereafter did not attend the House. It was said he would give up his seat as soon as the Government provided him with an office of profit. This did not happen and he remained an MP until the end of the Parliament. Although he never stood again, he carried on playing a part in politics as he had an interest in parliamentary seats in Somerset. He was High Sheriff of Somerset for the year 1741 to 1742.

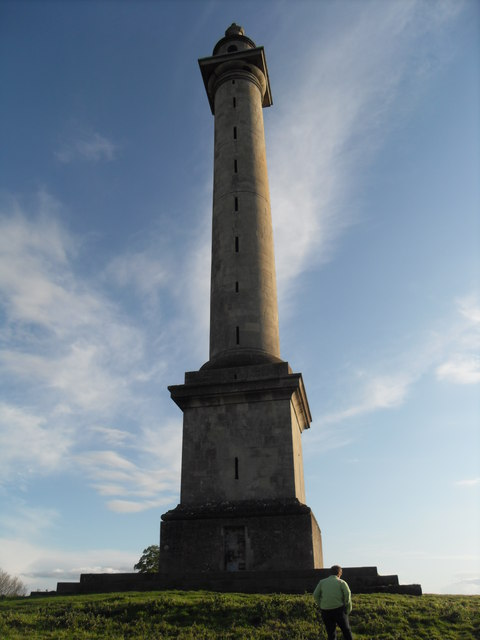
Burton Pynsent Monument

Pynsent died on 8 January 1765, aged 85, outliving his son and three daughters who had died without issue. Horace Walpole wrote of him: "He was said to have had parts and humour, not many scruples, living to her death with his only daughter, in pretty notorious incest".

He left his whole fortune to William Pitt, 1st Earl of Chatham who was no relation of his and whom he had never met. His will gave no reason for the bequest, merely observing: "I hope he will like my Burton estate, where I now live, well enough to make it his country seat". Pitt erected the Burton Pynsent Monument nearby in his memory at a cost of £2,000,

Parliament of Great Britain
Preceded by Sir Francis Warre; Henry Seymour Portman	Member of Parliament for Taunton; 1715–1722; With: James Smith	Succeeded by John Trenchard; James Smith
Baronetage of England
Preceded by William Pynsent	Baronet (of Erthfont); 1719-1765	Extinct
