= Sir William Pynsent, 1st Baronet =

English landowner and politician

Sir William Pynsent or Pinsent, 1st Baronet (1642–1719), of Urchfont, Wiltshire, was an English landowner and politician who sat in the House of Commons in 1689.

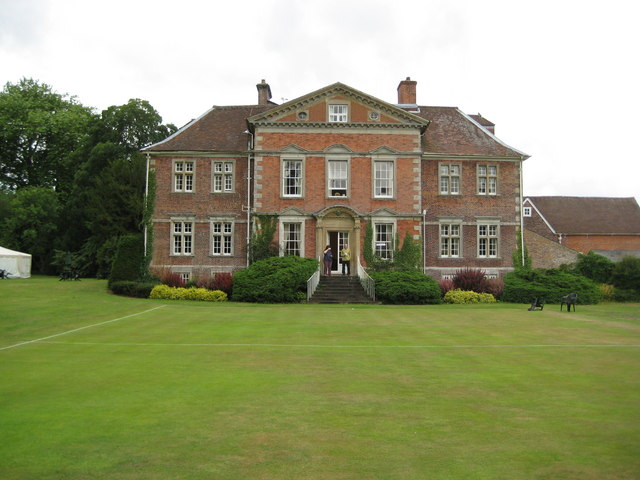
Urchfont Manor in 2009

Pynsent was baptised on 10 August 1642, the only son of William Pinsent, Merchant Taylor, of Watling Street, London and his wife Anne Lancelot, daughter of William Lancelot, Mercer, of St Olave, Hart Street, London. His father died in 1643 and he inherited his estate. He matriculated at Oriel College, Oxford in 1655 and was admitted at Lincoln's Inn in 1667. He married by licence dated 4 July 1676, Patience Bond, daughter of John Bond of London. In 1678 he purchased an estate at Urchfont, where he built a house, four miles from Devizes. He was created baronet on 13 September 1687.

Pynsent, a dissenter, was recommended for the Commission of the Peace for Wiltshire in 1688, serving as JP until his death. At the 1689 general election he was returned on the corporation interest as Member of Parliament (MP) for Devizes. He played little part in the Convention Parliament and did not stand for Parliament again. He was Commissioner for Assessment for Oxfordshire in 1689, and for Dorset and Wiltshire from 1689 to 1690. For the year 1693 to 1694, he was High Sheriff of Wiltshire.

Pynsent died in 1719. He had three sons and two daughters, but only the eldest son, William, survived to inherit the estate and baronetcy.

Parliament of England
Preceded by John Talbot of Lacock; Walter Grubbe	Member of Parliament for Devizes; 1689; With: Walter Grubbe	Succeeded by Sir Thomas Fowle; Walter Grubbe
Baronetage of England
New creation	Baronet (of Erthfont); 1687–1719	Succeeded by William Pynsent
