= Curry Rivel =

Village in Somerset, England

Coordinates: 51.023°N 2.868°W

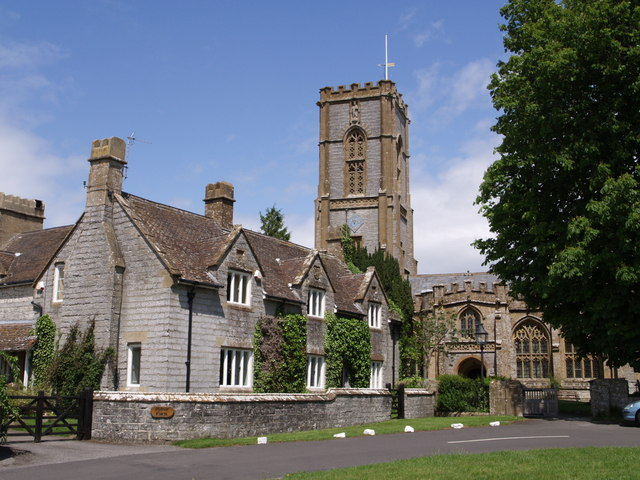
- Manor Farmhouse and Church of St Andrew

- Location within Somerset
- Population: 2,347 (2021)
- OS grid reference: ST391252
- Unitary authority: Somerset
- Ceremonial county: Somerset
- Region: South West
- Country: England
- Sovereign state: United Kingdom
- Post town: LANGPORT
- Postcode district: TA10
- Dialling code: 01458
- Police: Avon and Somerset
- Fire: Devon and Somerset
- Ambulance: South Western
- UK Parliament: Glastonbury and Somerton
- Website: Parish Council

Curry Rivel is a village and civil parish in Somerset, England, around 6 miles (10 km) west of Somerton and 10 miles (16 km) east of Taunton in the South Somerset district. The parish had a population of 2,347 at the 2021 census, and includes the hamlets of Burton Pynsent, Wick and Wiltown.

== History ==
The site of a Roman house has been discovered south of Fairview House. The site is on the Heritage at Risk Register due to ploughing.

The name Curry Rivel comes from the Celtic word crwy, meaning boundary and Rivel from its 12th-century landlord Sir Richard Revel.

In 1237 the king granted Henry de l'Orti a licence to empark his woods in Curry Rivel, separating it from the control of the foresters of Castle Neroche.

Curry Rivel was part of the hundred of Abdick and Bulstone.

== Notable structures ==
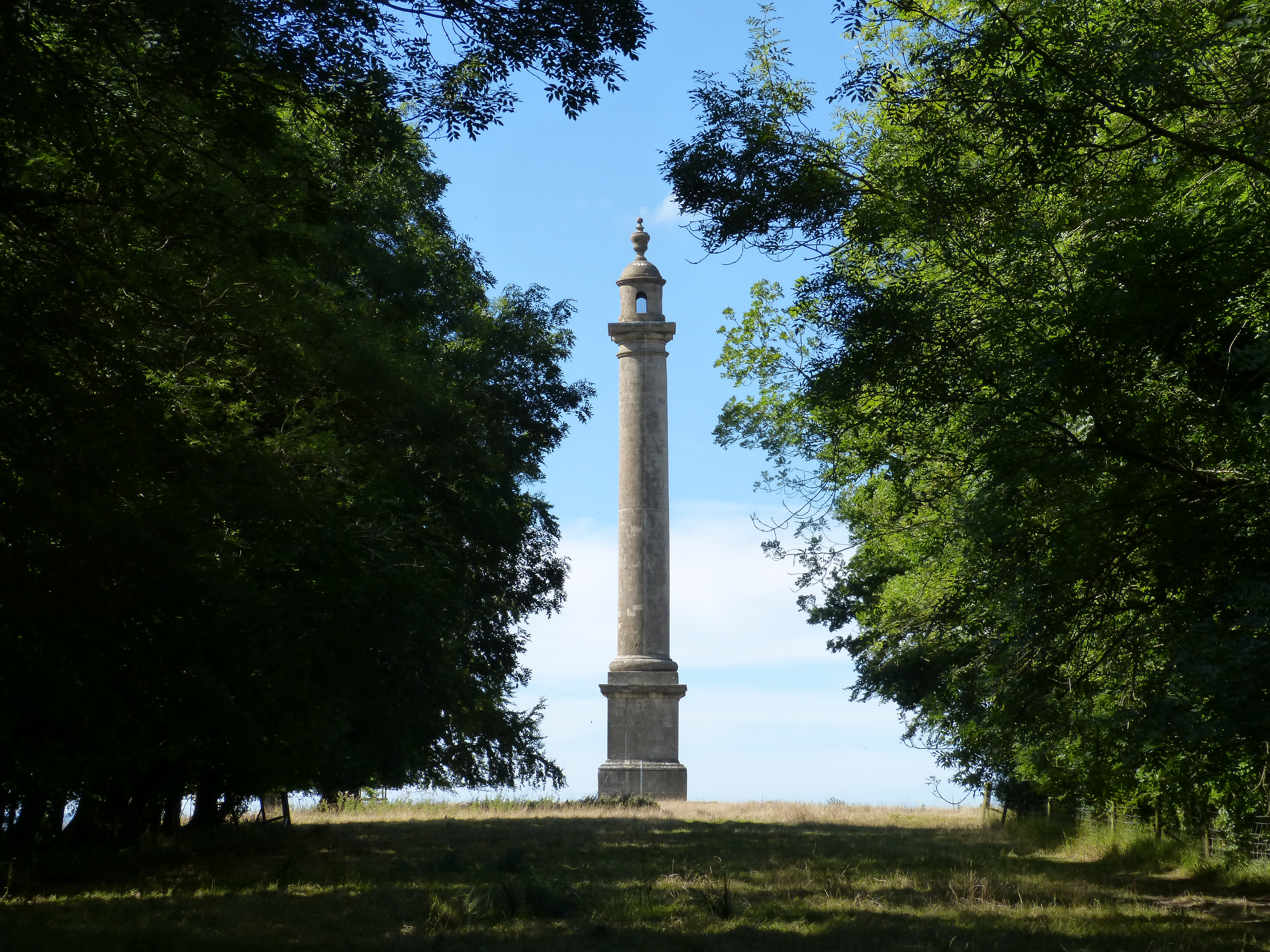
Burton Pynsent Monument

Earnshill House was built in 1725 by John Strachan for Henry Combe, a prominent Bristol merchant.

Burton Pynsent House was built around 1756 for William Pitt, 1st Earl of Chatham, after he inherited the estate from Sir William Pynsent, 2nd Baronet. It formed part of a wing on a larger earlier house, that was demolished around 1805. It has been designated as a Grade II* listed building. The grounds were laid out in the mid 18th century by Lancelot Brown and William Pitt, Earl of Chatham, and include early-20th-century formal gardens designed by Harold Peto. The Chatham Vase is a stone sculpture commissioned as a memorial to William Pitt the Elder by his wife, Hester, Countess of Chatham. It was originally erected at their house in Burton Pynsent, in 1781, and moved to the grounds of Chevening House in Kent in 1934, where it currently stands.

The 140 feet (43 m) Pynsent Column (also known as the Curry Rivel Column, Burton Pynsent Monument, Pynsent Steeple or Cider Monument) stands on Troy Hill, a spur of high ground about 700 m north-east of the house. It was designed in the 18th century by Capability Brown for William Pitt. It was restored in the 1990s by the John Paul Getty Trust and English Heritage.

Midelney Place is a Victorian country house, completed in 1866. Grade II listed and privately owned, it is set in 26 acres (11 ha) of landscaped grounds.

== Governance ==
The parish council has responsibility for local issues, including setting an annual precept (local rate) to cover the council's operating costs and producing annual accounts for public scrutiny. The parish council evaluates local planning applications and works with the local police, district council officers, and neighbourhood watch groups on matters of crime, security, and traffic. The parish council's role also includes initiating projects for the maintenance and repair of parish facilities, as well as consulting with the district council on the maintenance, repair, and improvement of highways, drainage, footpaths, public transport, and street cleaning. Conservation matters (including trees and listed buildings) and environmental issues are also the responsibility of the council.

For local government purposes, since 1 April 2023, the parish comes under the unitary authority of Somerset Council. Prior to this, it was part of the non-metropolitan district of South Somerset (established under the Local Government Act 1972). It was part of Langport Rural District before 1974.

The parish is part of the Glastonbury and Somerton county constituency, represented in the House of Commons of the Parliament of the United Kingdom.

== Amenities ==
The Anglican parish Church of St Andrew dates from the 13th century and is designated as a Grade I listed building.

Education for children aged 11 and under is provided at Curry Rivel Primary School.
