= Walter Grubbe =

English politician

Walter Grubbe (1655–1715), of Eastwell House, Potterne, Wiltshire, was an English politician.

He was a member (MP) of the parliament of England for Devizes in 1685, 1689 and 1690.
