= Burton Pynsent House =

Historic building in Somerset, England

- Location within Somerset
- 51°00′57″N 2°53′40″W
- Location: Curry Rivel, Somerset, England, U.K.

History
- Built: 1756

Listed Building – Grade II*
- Official name: Burton Pynsent House
- Designated: 17 April 1959
- Reference no.: 1373913

Burton Pynsent House is a historic country-house in the parish of Curry Rivel, Somerset, England. It is a Grade II* listed building. The house was built in stages between 1565 and 1765, when it was bequeathed to William Pitt, 1st Earl of Chatham by Sir William Pynsent, 2nd Baronet, who did not want the house to go to Lord North. Pitt had an additional wing built to a design by Lancelot Brown, and the subsequent owner demolished everything but this wing in 1805.

The house was extended around this wing in the 20th century, overlooking the 98 hectares (240 acres) of formal gardens and parkland. To the northwest of the house is Burton Pynsent Monument, a 140 feet (43 m) column with an urn finial, built to commemorate Pynsent's generosity to Pitt.

== History ==
The house at Burton Pynsent was built section by section over many years. Construction was commenced by Marmaduke Jennings in approximately 1565 and was continued by the Jennings family throughout the 17th century. The house passed to William Pynsent, who married Mary Star, the widowed daughter of Thomas Jennings. Pynsent bequeathed the house to his political idol, William Pitt, 1st Earl of Chatham, despite never meeting him. His intention was to disinherit Lord North, a relative of his wife, who had supported a tax on Somerset cider which Pynsent disagreed with, and which Pitt had blocked. After Pynsent died in 1765 his relatives were unhappy at being left just 1,000 guineas each, and unsuccessfully contested the will over the following six years.

Pitt immediately commissioned Lancelot Brown to design a monument in memory of Pynsent's generosity, built by Philip Pear at a cost of £2,000 (equivalent to £305,526 in 2025). Brown also advised on the landscaping of the parkland and possibly designed the wing that Pitt built on the eastern end of the house. Despite complaints from the Pynsent family, Pitt started landscaping the gardens and began other works in 1766.

Pitt sold part of the estate to help repurchase his seat at Hayes Place, Kent, but still resided at Burton Pynsent for periods until his death in 1778. His widow remained at the estate until her death in 1803. The estate was split up and sold in 1805, to pay for John Pitt's gambling debts, with the house and park being purchased for £8,810 (equivalent to £657,511 in 2025). The new owner, Colonel Pinney, demolished most of the house but retained the 18th-century wing. The house passed through a number of hands during the 19th century before being purchased by a relation of Harold Peto, Mrs Crossley. The house remained in the hands of the Crossley family for the majority of the 20th century.

The grounds were laid out in the mid 18th century by Pitt and Lancelot Brown; and they include early-20th-century formal gardens designed by Peto. The formal gardens are listed, Grade II, on the Register of Historic Parks and Gardens of special historic interest in England.

== House ==
The house is built on a flat terrace near the south west of corner of the estate. The two-storey building is constructed of brick in a classical style, dressed with ham stone features and a hipped tile roof. The garden frontage of the house is symmetrical with a pediment at the centre above a cupola. It includes a porched door with some semi-circular stone steps toward the garden. The entrance facade is asymmetrical, with a tall arcaded entrance projecting out from the house on the south-west corner.

The western facade was altered during the 20th century to compensate for the demolition of large parts of the house in 1805. The house is now largely built around the wing that had been built for William Pitt. Pitt's wing contained a library for himself and a 'bird room' for his wife, away from their children's rooms. The house was designated as Grade II* listed in 1984. In 2001 the house was put up for rent for £36,000 (equivalent to £67,582 in 2025), described as having seven bedrooms, four bathrooms and half a dozen reception rooms and offices.

== Grounds ==
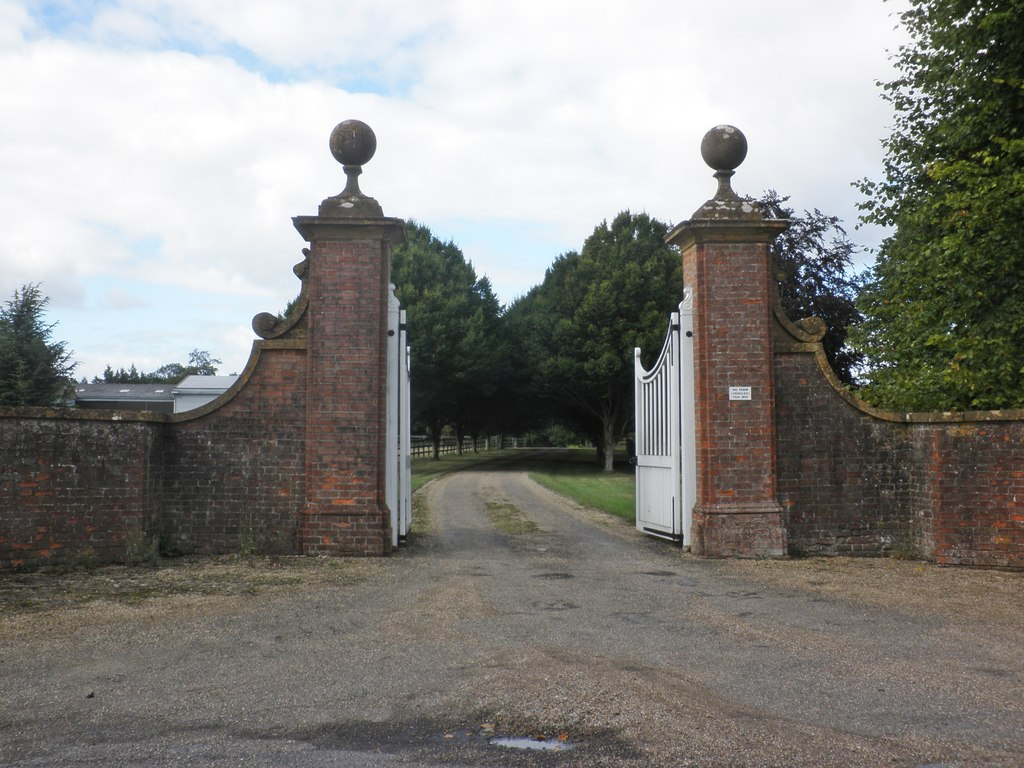
Entrance to Burton Pynsent House

Burton Pynsent House is set in 98 hectares (240 acres), comprising 1 hectare (2.5 acres) of formal gardens and pleasure grounds; the remaining area is parkland. It is bounded to the north by the Burton Dairy Farm and to the south by the A378. The parkland and planted woods merge into two other woods at the boundaries – Swell Wood at the south-west and Stoneley Copse in the north-east.

The entrance to Burton Pynsent House is between a pair of 18th-century square brick columns, decorated with ham stone, flanked by walls. The drive is 190 metres (620 ft) long, with a spur leading to the house's home farm and kitchen garden. The formal gardens are found to the south, west and east of the house, with informal pleasure grounds to the north-west.

=== Gardens ===
The entrance to the house faces an area of lawn and ornamental shrubbery. To the south east is a pathway to a pergola, in front of a terrace garden, with a paved walkway through topiary. The walkway leads to a flower garden, and beyond to a lawn surrounded by yew hedges with an apse at one end. At the other end of the pergola is a walkway flanked by lime trees.

To the east of the house there is a further terrace, surrounded by balustrades with views towards the Pynsent Column. There are flagstone walkways leading to panels of lawn, interspaced with topiary spheres. The walkway leads to an area of ornamental shrubs and a woodland garden.

=== Monument ===
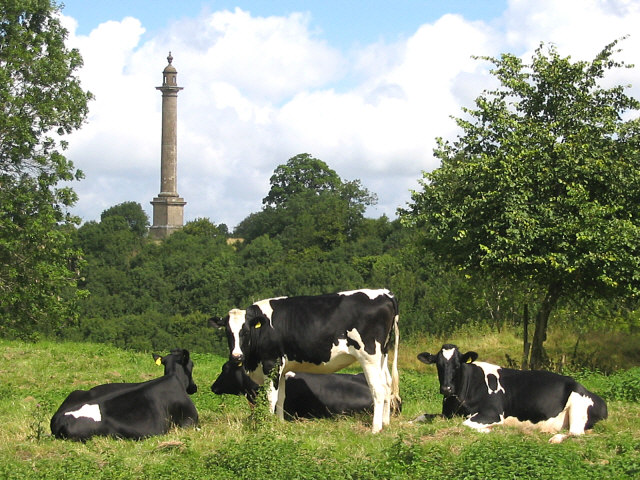
Burton Pynsent Monument

Towards the east and north-east of the house there is parkland, the majority of which has been turned over to agricultural use, grazing to the north-east and planting to the east. The 140 feet (43 m) Pynsent Column (also known as the Curry Rivel Column, Burton Pynsent Monument, Pynsent Steeple or Cider Monument) sits 700 metres (2,300 ft) to the north east of the house, at the top of Troy Hill. It was designed in the 18th century by Capability Brown for William Pitt. The column is built of blue lias and is of Roman Doric style, with a square base and a square podium. At the top of the column is a cupola with an urn finial. The monument was restored in the 1990s by the John Paul Getty Trust and English Heritage.
