= Urchfont =

Village in Wiltshire, England

Coordinates: 51.312°N 1.944°W

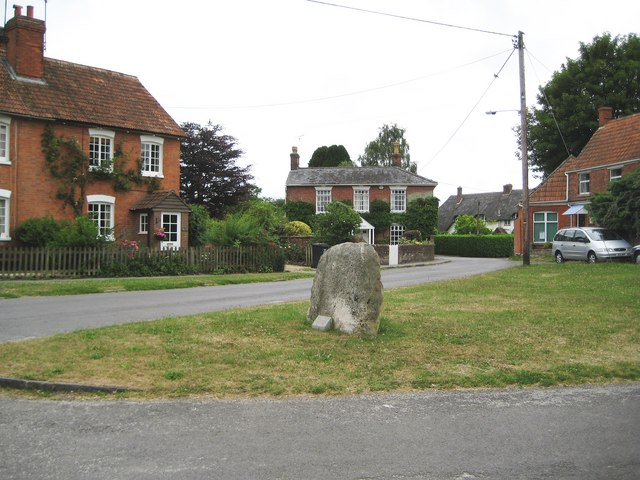
- Millennium Stone, Urchfont

- Location within Wiltshire
- Population: 1,075 (in 2011)
- OS grid reference: SU0457
- Civil parish: Urchfont
- Unitary authority: Wiltshire
- Ceremonial county: Wiltshire
- Region: South West
- Country: England
- Sovereign state: United Kingdom
- Post town: Devizes
- Postcode district: SN10
- Dialling code: 01380
- Police: Wiltshire
- Fire: Dorset and Wiltshire
- Ambulance: South Western
- UK Parliament: Melksham and Devizes
- Website: Parish Council

Urchfont is a rural village and civil parish in the southwest of the Vale of Pewsey and north of Salisbury Plain in Wiltshire, England, about 3 1/2 miles (6 km) southeast of the market town of Devizes. The hamlet of Cuckoo's Corner is in the northwest of the village; the parish includes the hamlets of Wedhampton (grid reference SU060577) and Lydeway (SU052578). The population of the parish at the 2011 census was 1,075.

Urchfont village lies mostly to the north of the B3098 road which connects Market Lavington to the A342 Devizes-Upavon road. The parish narrows as it extends southeast onto Salisbury Plain and into the military training area.

== History ==
There are remains of several bowl barrows on the downland in the south of the parish, and evidence of a late prehistoric or Roman field system on Penning Down. Medieval strip lynchets can be seen on the north-facing slope of Urchfont Hill.

Domesday Book in 1086 recorded a large settlement of 82 households at Lerchesfonte, with three mills, and land held by St Mary's Abbey, Winchester. The land (later as separate estates of Urchfont, Northcombe and Wedhampton) continued in the ownership of the abbey until the Dissolution in the 1530s.

The parish had three tithings, each stretching from north to south: Eastcott (in the west), Urchfont (central) and Wedhampton (east). Stert, to the north, was anciently linked to Urchfont for church purposes but had been made a separate civil parish by the time of the 1881 census.

A manor house was standing by 1487, and a new Urchfont House (later called Urchfont Manor) was built just west of the village in the late 17th century by Sir William Pynsent, 1st Baronet. Later owners included Charles Douglas, 3rd Duke of Queensberry (late 18th century) and Simon Watson Taylor (from 1843). Pevsner describes the house as one of the best of its type in Wiltshire. The Grade II* listed building housed an adult education college from 1947 until 2012, when it returned to residential use.

Downland in the south of the parish was bought by the War Department in stages from 1897, and today forms part of the military Salisbury Plain Training Area.

=== Origin of the name ===
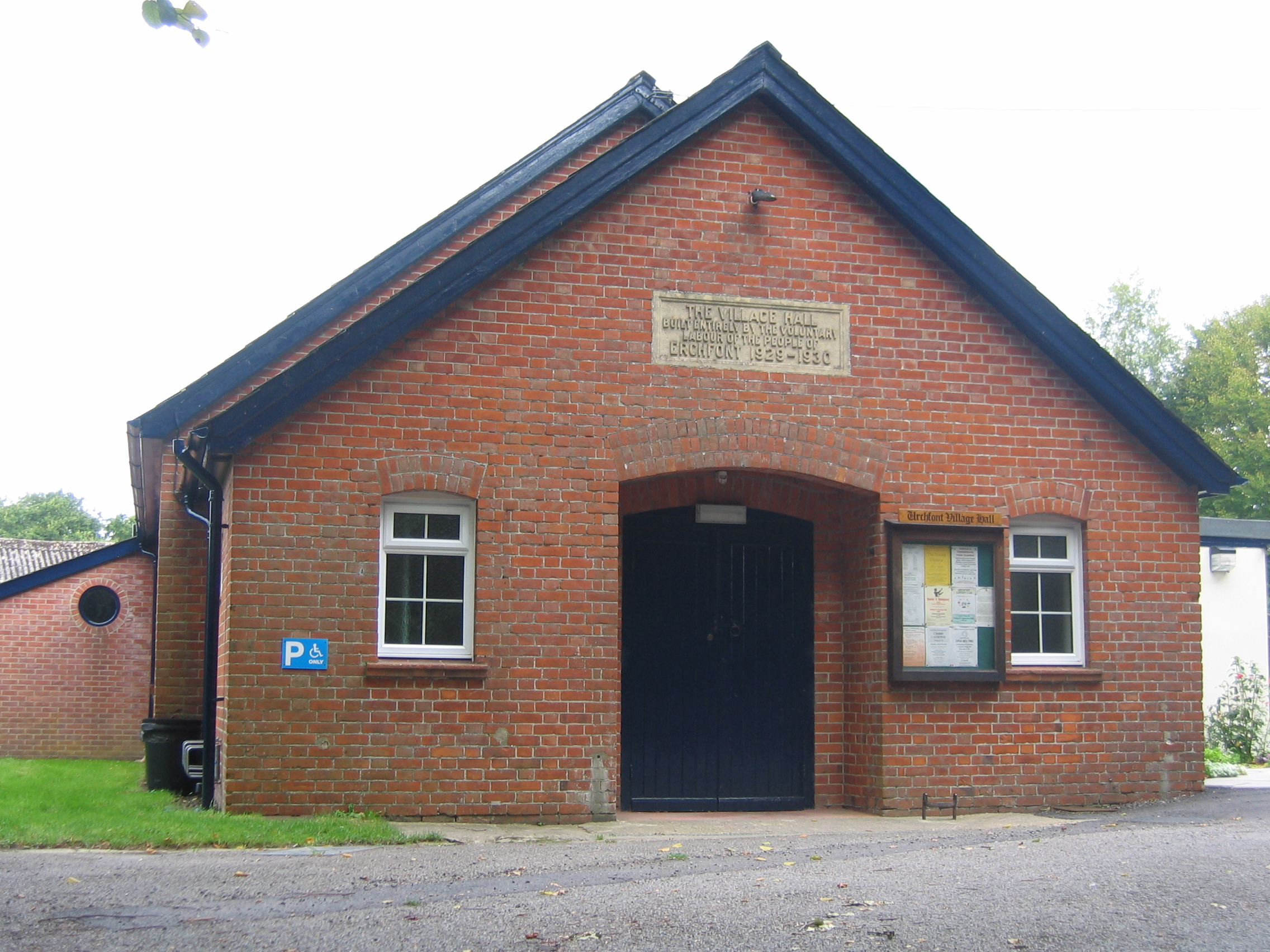
The village hall of 1930 carries the name Erchfont

The name of Urchfont is often thought to derive from the phrase "Church Fountain" and is possibly derived from Latin fons meaning 'spring, fountain, well' (cf. fount), or the first element may be a lost personal name such as Eohric. Over 100 variations of the spelling are recorded; e.g. Lerchesfonte (1086), Erchesfonte(e) (1175, 1605), Erkesfonte (1175), Archesfunte (font) (1179, 1376, 1426), Ur(i)chesfunte (1242, 1289), Orchesfunte (1259), Orcheffunte (1428), Archfounte al. Urshent (1564), Urchefount al. Urshent (1611), Urshent al. Erchfont (1695).

== Parish church ==
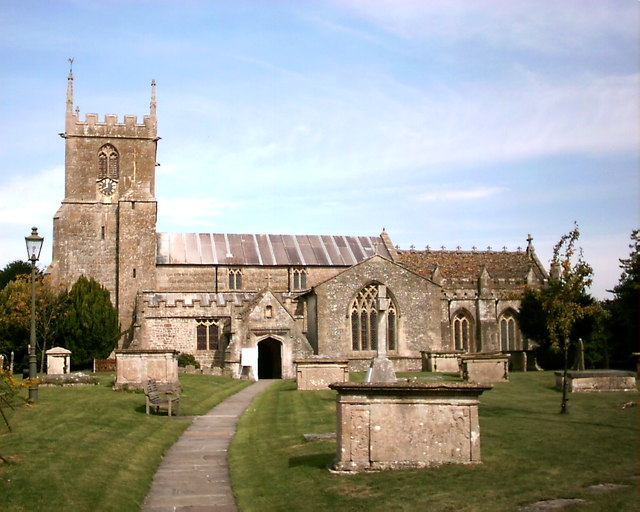
St Michael's Church, Urchfont

There was a church at Urchfont, linked to St Mary's Abbey, Winchester from at least the early 13th century. The present church of St Michael and All Angels dates from the late 13th and early 14th centuries, although the chancel arch and the font are early 13th; the west tower is late 15th-century and has tall pinnacles. The six-bay chancel has fine vaulting with carved bosses, observed by Pevsner to be like the aisles of Bristol Cathedral; vaulting in the south porch is described by Historic England as exceptional. The aisles were re-roofed in 1631 and 1787, and restoration was carried out in 1864 and 1900.

The eight bells include one which is possibly from the 14th century, and four from the 17th. Monuments include an aedicula for Thomas Ernle (d. 1725) of Wedhampton and the tomb of Robert Tothill sculpted by Peter Scheemakers in 1753.

There is stained glass by William Wailes, some dated 1852. The church was recorded as Grade I listed in 1962, and many of the monuments in the churchyard are Grade II listed, 18th-century chest tombs among them.

Eastcott tithing was part of Urchfont ecclesiastical parish until it was transferred to the new parish of Easterton in 1874. The church at Stert was annexed to Urchfont as a chapelry in the early 13th century, and this relationship continued after Stert was made a civil parish in the late 19th century. Today the churches at Urchfont and Stert are served by the Cannings and Redhorn team ministry, alongside six others in nearby villages.

== Governance ==
The civil parish elects a parish council. It is in the area of Wiltshire Council, a unitary authority, which is responsible for all significant local government functions.

== Amenities ==
There is a primary school, Urchfont C of E Primary School. There is a family-run dental practice, Urchfont Dental Care, offering private and NHS services.

The village has tennis courts, a cricket pitch and a skittle alley (within The Lamb Inn pub). Urchfont Cricket Club played in the Wiltshire County Cricket League until 2017, and now play "friendly" matches against local teams.

The Wessex Ridgeway long-distance footpath runs north–south through Urchfont village; to the south it turns west to follow the northern scarp of the Plain towards Westbury.

== Railways ==
The Berks and Hants Extension Railway was built through the far northeast of the parish for the GWR in 1862, providing a route from Hungerford via Pewsey to Devizes and further west. In 1900 the same company built the Stert and Westbury Railway, which diverged from the earlier line near Patney, east of Urchfont parish; later, part of the parish's northwestern boundary was redrawn to follow this line. The line through Devizes closed in 1966 and was dismantled, while the 1900 line is still in use as part of the Reading to Taunton Line.

In 2018, proposals were made to reinstate rail access in the Devizes area by building a station at Clock Inn Park, Lydeway, where the Reading–Taunton line is crossed by the A342. In 2020 and 2022 the project received funding from the Department for Transport for feasibility studies.

== Notable people ==
Sergeant Thomas Gray VC was born in Urchfont in 1914. An Air Observer/Navigator in the Royal Air Force, he was posthumously awarded the Victoria Cross after he was killed in action in 1940.

The cricket scorer Bill Frindall (nicknamed 'The Bearded Wonder') lived at Urchfont until his death.

Revd. William Noyes (1568–1622), Anglican clergyman of Puritan teachings, was brought up at Urchfont; he was rector of Cholderton, Wiltshire from 1602.

Singer Elvis Costello has owned a summer home in the village since the late 1990s.

== Urchfont Scarecrow Festival ==
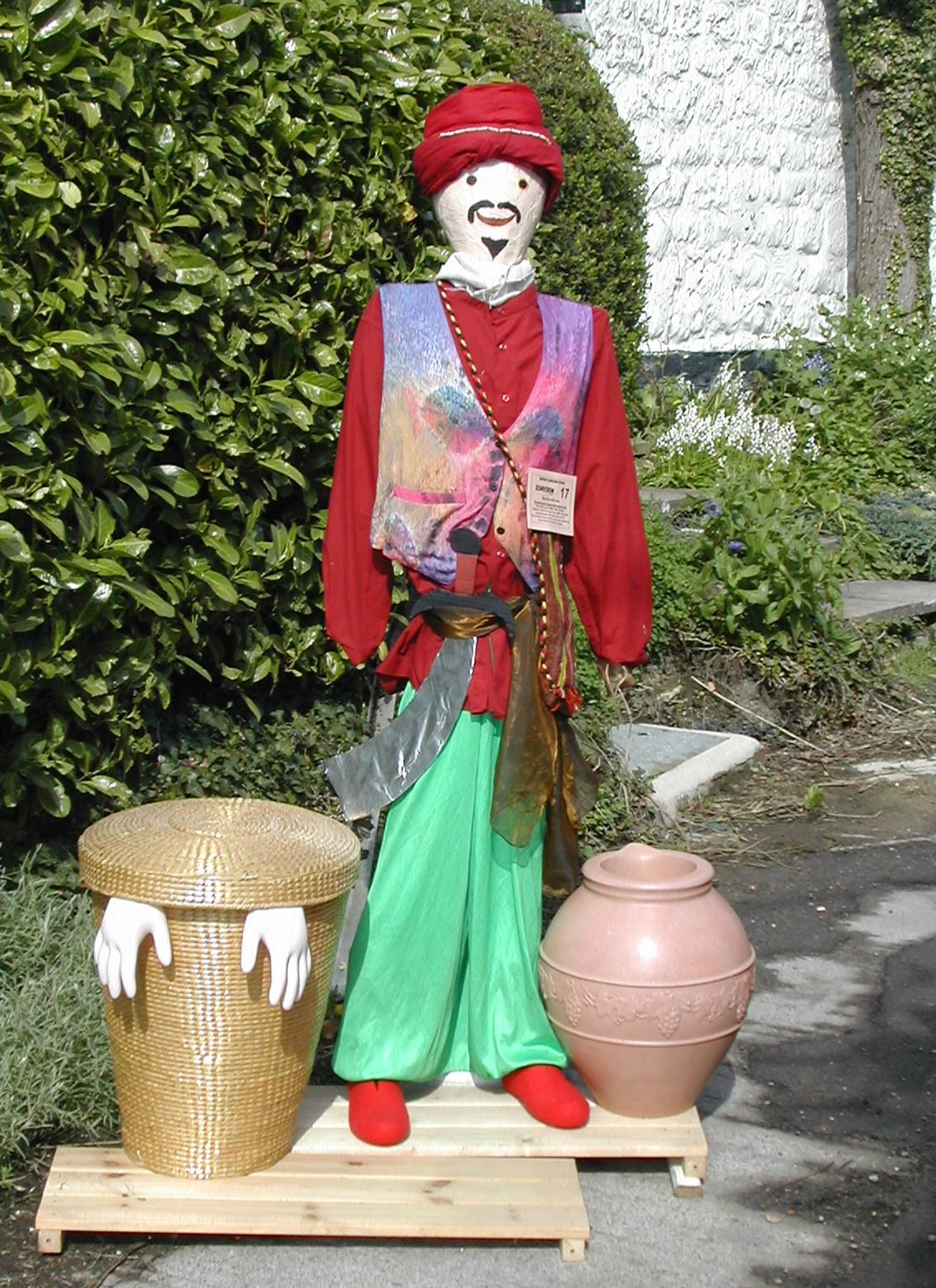
Urchfont Scarecrow Festival: Ali Baba

The Urchfont Scarecrow Festival (a registered charity) was the first of its kind in Wiltshire. While other Wiltshire villages have established festivals on a similar model, the Urchfont festival predates them, having been established in 1997.

The idea was first brought to the village by a resident who saw a similar festival in Derbyshire. In its entire history, the festival has been cancelled three times: once in 2001 because of the threat from Foot and Mouth disease and in 2020 and 2021 due to COVID-19. Apart from those cancellations the 25 festivals to date have taken place on the weekend of the first bank holiday in May and have grown to become a major local event attracting thousands of local and national visitors while raising money for local charities and good causes.

Around 50 themed scarecrows made by villagers are displayed around the village, and visitors can buy a trail map which provides clues as to the identity of each scarecrow. There is also a children's trail and the village is a buzz with festivities, food and drink marquees, and activities.

Past festivals have included:

- 1997 – 2000 – No theme
- 2001 – Cancelled due to Foot and Mouth outbreak
- 2002 – Characters for the Young at Heart
- 2003 – Professions
- 2004 – Book Titles
- 2005 – Songs & Music
- 2006 – The Good, The Bad & The Ugly
- 2007 – Film Titles
- 2008 – Scarecrow Pursuits
- 2009 – Musicals – Stage & Screen
- 2010 – Pairs
- 2011 – Advertisements
- 2012 – A, B, C
- 2013 – Singers
- 2014 – Myths & Legends
- 2015 – At the Oscars
- 2016 – A World of Firsts
- 2017 – From the Sublime to the Ridiculous
- 2018 – It's Showtime!
- 2019 – Back to the 80s
- 2020 and 2021 – Cancelled due to COVID-19 pandemic
- 2022 – World of Colour
- 2023 – The West Country
- 2024 – Icons of the Silver Screen
- 2025 – Titles
- 2026 - Musicians
