= Pynsent baronets =

Extinct baronetcy in the Baronetage of England

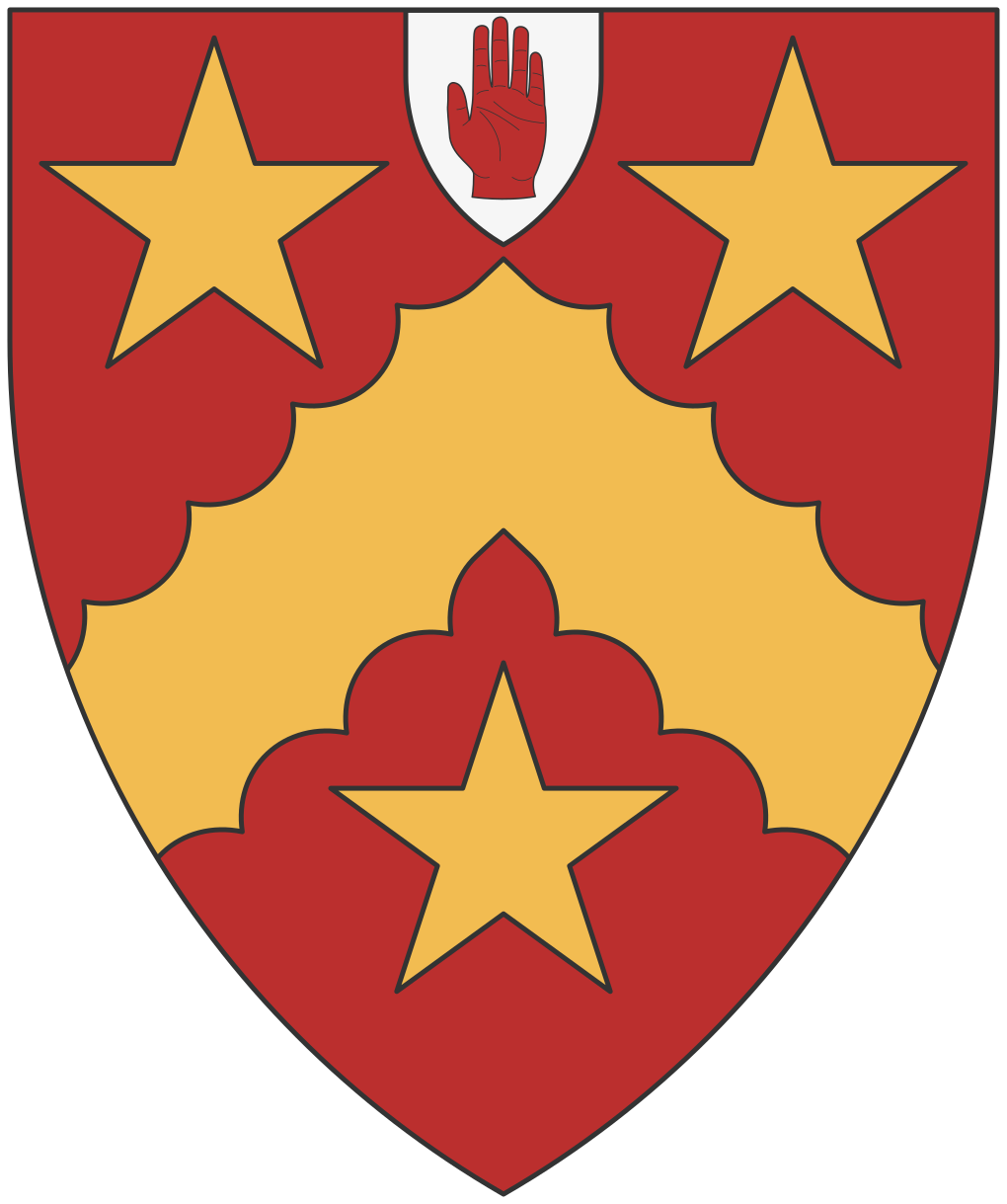
The coat of arms of the Pynsent baronets.

The Pynsent Baronetcy, of Erthfont in the County of Wiltshire, was a title in the Baronetage of England. It was created on 13 September 1687 for William Pynsent, subsequently Member of Parliament for Devizes. The second Baronet was member of parliament for Taunton. The title became extinct on his death in 1765.

== Pynsent baronets, of Erthfont (1687) ==
- Sir William Pynsent, 1st Baronet (1642–1719)
- Sir William Pynsent, 2nd Baronet (c. 1679 – 12 January 1765)

== See also ==
- Pinsent baronets
