= History of Telangana =

The history of Telangana, located on the high Deccan Plateau, includes its being ruled by the Maurya Empire (320 BCE to 230 BCE), the Satavahana Dynasty (230 BCE to 220 CE), the Kakatiya Dynasty (1083–1323), the Musunuri Nayaks (1335–1368), the Delhi Sultanate, the Bahmani Sultanate (1347–1512), Golconda Sultanate (1512–1687) and Asaf Jahi dynasty (1724–1950).

In 1724, Nizam-ul-Mulk defeated Mubariz Khan and conquered Hyderabad. His successors ruled the princely state of Hyderabad, as Nizams of Hyderabad. The Nizams established first railways, postal and telegraph networks, and the first modern universities in Telangana.

After Indian independence, the Nizam did not sign the instrument of accession to India. The Indian army invaded and annexed Hyderabad State in 1948. From 1948 to 1956, Telangana remained as part of Hyderabad State, and then it was merged into Andhra Pradesh, a state created for Telugu people. In 2014, Telangana became the 29th state of India after the bifurcation of Andhra Pradesh, consisting of thirty-three (33) districts, with Hyderabad as its capital. The city of Hyderabad served as the joint capital for the residual Andhra Pradesh and Telangana for a period of ten years until 2024.

== Early history ==
=== Aśmaka (Assaka) Mahajanapada ===
One of the earliest known political formations in the region of present-day Telangana was the ancient Aśmaka (Assaka) Mahajanapada, which flourished roughly between 700 BCE and 400 BCE. Distinguished as the only southern kingdom among the sixteen great Mahajanapadas of early Iron Age India, Aśmaka held an important place in the subcontinent's historical and cultural landscape.

Buddhist texts and the Puranas describe Aśmaka as a prosperous kingdom situated along the banks of the Godavari River, south of the Vindhya ranges. Its capital city, Podana—also referred to as Potali or Paudanyapura—is identified by most scholars with modern-day Bodhan in Telangana The prominence of Aśmaka in early historical texts highlights the deep antiquity and cultural significance of the Telangana region.

=== Satavahana Dynasty ===
The Satavahanas rose to political power after the fall of the Mauryan Empire. Koti Lingala seems to be one of the 30 cities of Satavahana dynasty. Excavations revealed brick wells, coins belonging to a pre-Satavahana period, namely, Gobhada and Samagopa. It is believed that the place is the site of the hermitage of sage Bhavari. Several coins of Simukha, the founder of the Satavahana dynasty, and those of other early rulers like Kanha and Satakarni I were found.

The Deccan, during this period, was an emporium of inland and maritime trade. The region between the rivers of Godavari and Krishna was full of ports and throbbing with activity. There was plenty of currency to facilitate trade and the people entered upon a period of great industrial, commercial and maritime activity. Buddhism flourished throughout the period and the rulers were also devoted to Vedic ritualism. They constructed several Buddhist Stupas, Viharas and Chaityas. Satavahanas were able rulers and loved literacy and architecture. The 17th ruler of this dynasty, Hāla was a great poet and his "Gathasaptasati" in Prakrit was well received by all. Gunadhnya, the minister of Hala was the author of "Brihatkadha". According to Matsya Purana, there were 29 rulers of this dynasty. They ruled over for about 456 years, from the 2nd century BC to the 2nd century AD. The empire included most of the southern peninsula and some southern parts of the present Indian states of Maharashtra, Orissa and Madhya Pradesh. The court language used by the Satavahanas was Prakrit.

The decline and fall of the Satavahana Empire left the state in a political chaos. Local rulers, as well as invaders, tried to carve out small kingdoms for themselves and to establish many dynasties. Such instability continued to prevail until the rise of the Western Chalukyas.

== Kakatiya dynasty ==
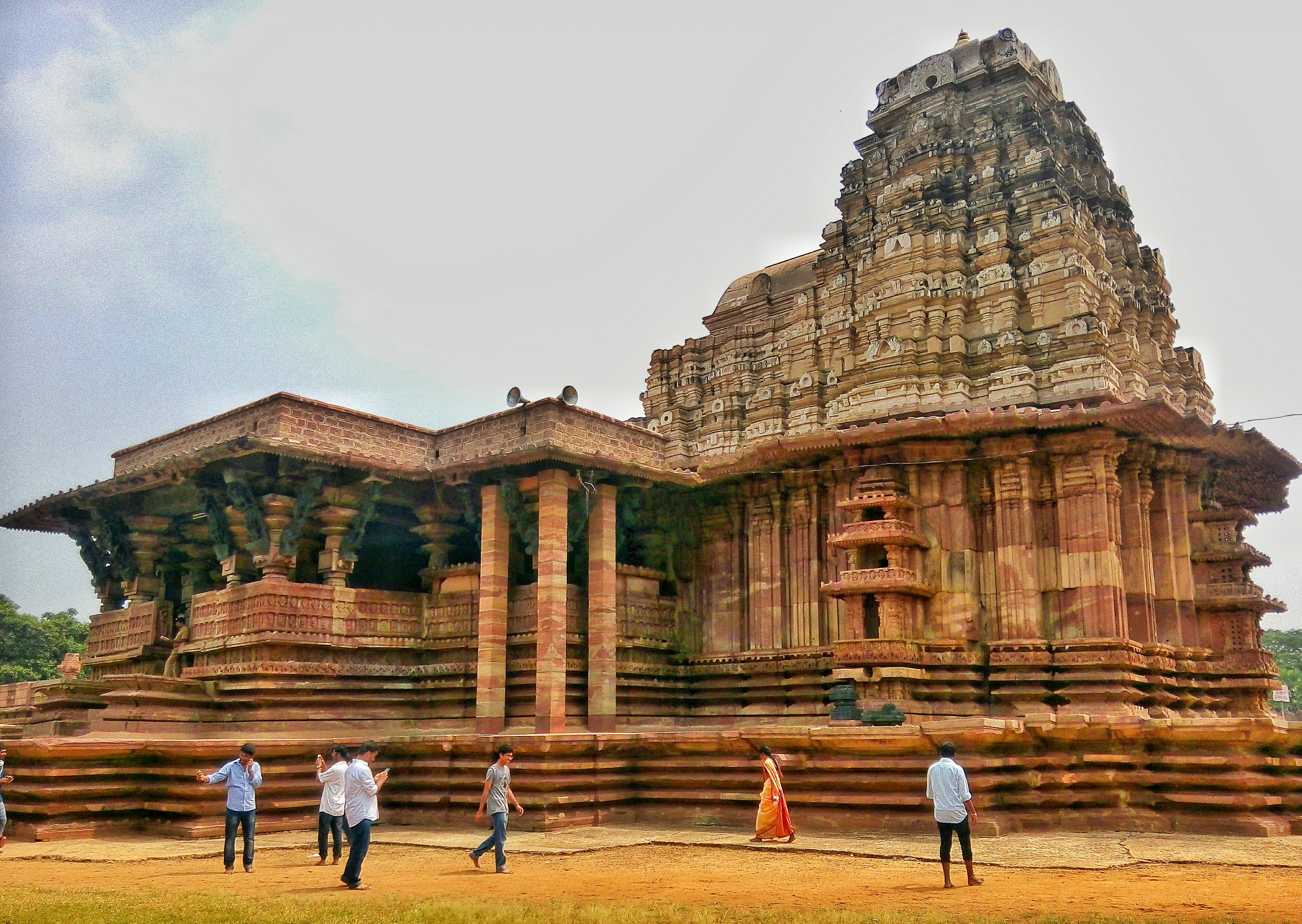
The Ramappa temple constructed during the reign of the Kakatiya dynasty, is a World Heritage Site.

The 12th and 13th centuries saw the emergence of the Kakatiya dynasty. The Kakatiyas are known for their famous architecture such as Warangal Fort, Ramappa Temple, Thousand Pillar Temple and Kota Gullu.

At first they were feudatories of the Western Chalukyas of Kalyani, ruling over a small territory near Warangal. A ruler of this dynasty, Prola II (1110–1158), extended his sway to the south and declared his independence. His successor Rudra (1158–1195) pushed the kingdom to the east up to the Godavari delta. He built Warangal Fort to serve as a second capital and faced the invasions of the Seuna Yadavas of Devagiri. The next ruler, Mahadeva, extended the kingdom to the coastal area. Ganapati Deva succeeded him in 1199. He was the greatest of the Kakatiyas and the first after the Satavahanas to bring almost the entire Telugu area under one unified empire. Ganapati put an end to the rule of the Velanati Cholas in 1210 and extended his empire to Anakapalle in the north.

The most prominent ruler in this dynasty was Rani Rudrama Devi (1262–1289), one of the few queens in Indian history. An able fighter and ruler, Rudrama defended the kingdom against the Cholas and the Seuna Yadavas, earning their respect. Marco Polo visited India during her reign and made note of her rule.

On the death of Rudrama at the beginning of 1290, her grandson Prataparudra II ascended the throne. Prataparudra had to fight battles throughout his reign against either internal rebels or external foes. Prataparudra expanded his borders to the west to Raichur and in the south to Ongole and the Nallamala Hills, whilst introducing many administrative reforms, some of which were also later adopted in the Vijayanagara Empire.

In 1309, the Sultan of Delhi, Alauddin Khilji sent his general Malik Kafur on an expedition to the Kakatiya kingdom. Kafur's army reached the Kakatiya capital Warangal in January 1310, and breached its outer fort after a month-long siege. The Kakatiya ruler Prataparudra decided to surrender and agreed to pay tribute. Kafur returned to Delhi in June 1310 with a huge amount of wealth obtained from the defeated king.

=== Invasion by Delhi Sultanate ===
In 1323, Ghiyath al-Din Tughluq sent his son Ulugh Khan on an expedition to the Kakatiya capital of Warangal. The ensuing Siege of Warangal resulted in the annexation of Warangal, and the end of the Kakatiya dynasty. Prataparudra was taken captive, and sent to Delhi, but it is believed he died en route. Ulugh Khan ruled briefly as viceroy, until he returned to Delhi to succeed the throne.

As early as 1330, the Musunuri Nayaks who served as army chiefs for Kakatiya kingdom united the various Telugu clans and recovered Warangal from the viceroy of the Delhi Sultanate and ruled for half a century. Surrounded by more significant states, by the 15th century these new entities had ceded to the Bahmani Sultanate and the Sangama dynasty, the latter of which evolved to become the Vijayanagara Empire.

== Bahmani and Deccan Sultanates ==
The Qutb Shahi Monuments of Hyderabad

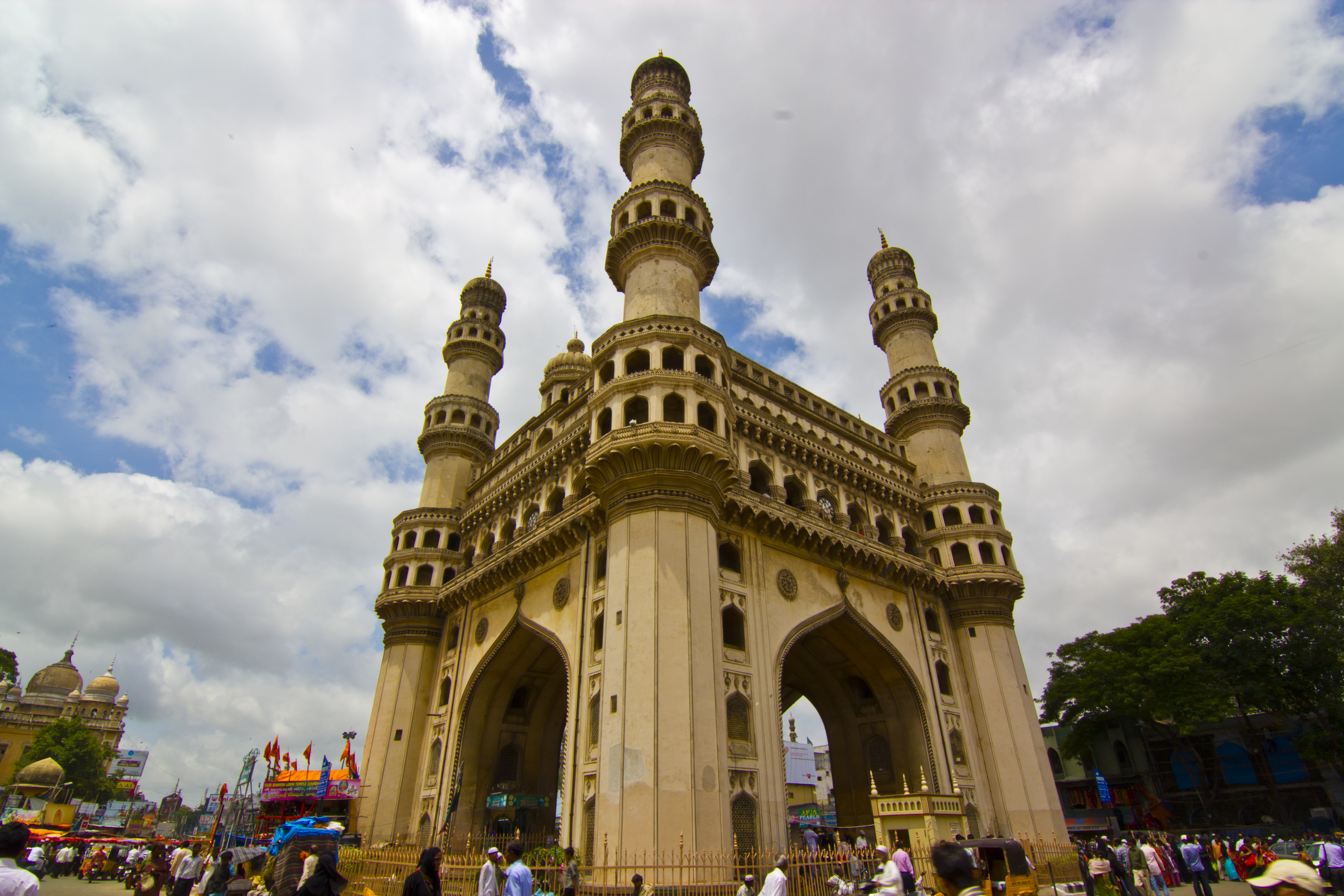
Charminar

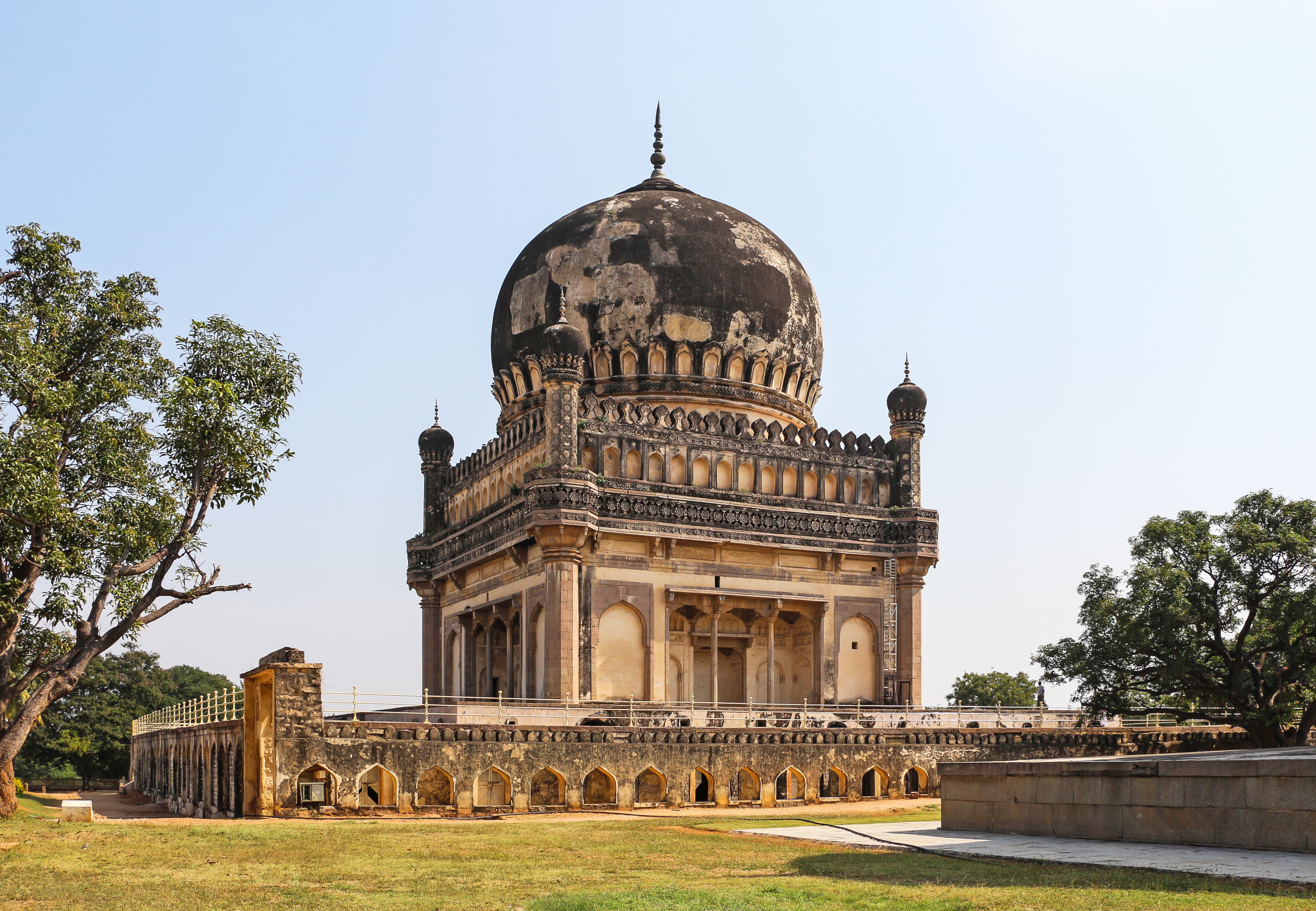
One of the Qutb Shahi tombs

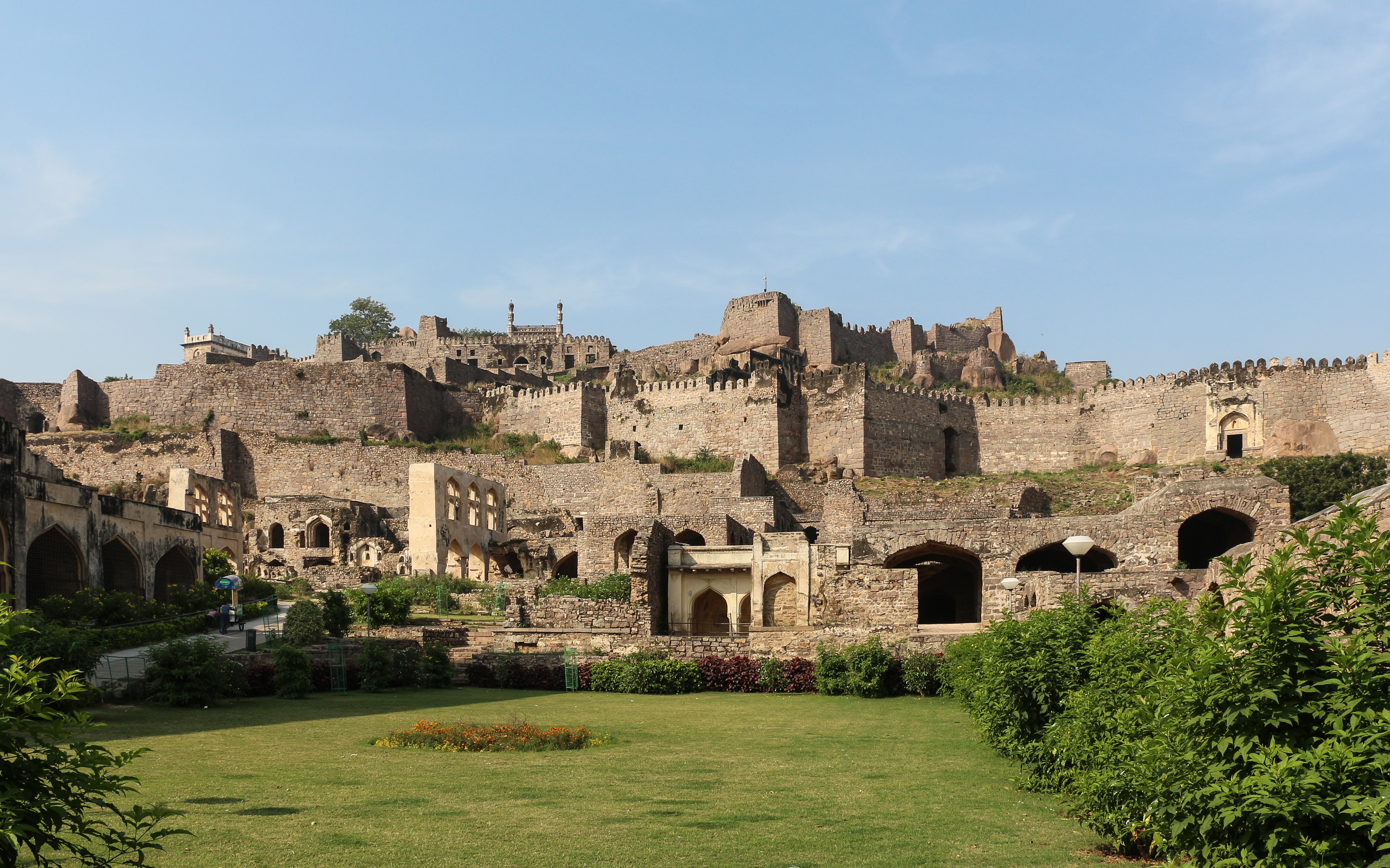
Golconda Fort

The Qutb Shahi Monuments of Hyderabad were submitted by India in the tentative list for UNESCO World Heritage status in 2011.

The Bahmani Sultanate ruled the region in the 15th century. In 1463, Sultan Muhammad Shah Bahmani II dispatched Sultan Quli Qutb-ul-Mulk to the Telangana region to quell disturbances. Sultan Quli quelled the disturbance and was rewarded as the administrator of the region. He established a base at Kakatiya hill fortress of Golconda which he strengthened and expanded considerably. By the end of the century, Quli ruled from Golconda as the subedar (governor) of the Telangana region. Quli enjoyed virtual independence from Bidar, where the Bahmani Sultanate was then based. In 1518, the Bahmani Sultanate disintegrated into five different kingdoms, with the others based in Ahmednagar, Berar, Bidar and Bijapur. Sultan Quli declared independence from the Bahmani rule and established the Golconda Sultanate under the title "Sultan Quli Qutub Shah", he rebuilt the mud-fort of Golconda and named the city Muhammad Nagar.

During this period, the city of Hyderabad was established by Muhammad Quli Qutb Shah in 1591, on the banks of the Musi River. The Charminar and Mecca Masjid were constructed to form a centerpiece of the city. Over the years, Hyderabad would grow as an important trading center for diamonds, pearls, arms and steel.

The Qutb Shahi rulers were patrons of both Indo-Persian and the local Telugu art and culture. Early Indo-Islamic type of architecture is reflected in the Qutb Shahi buildings. Some examples of it include the Golconda Fort, Qutb Shahi tombs, Charminar, Mecca Masjid, Khairtabad Mosque, Taramati Baradari and Toli Mosque.

== Mughal conquest and rule ==
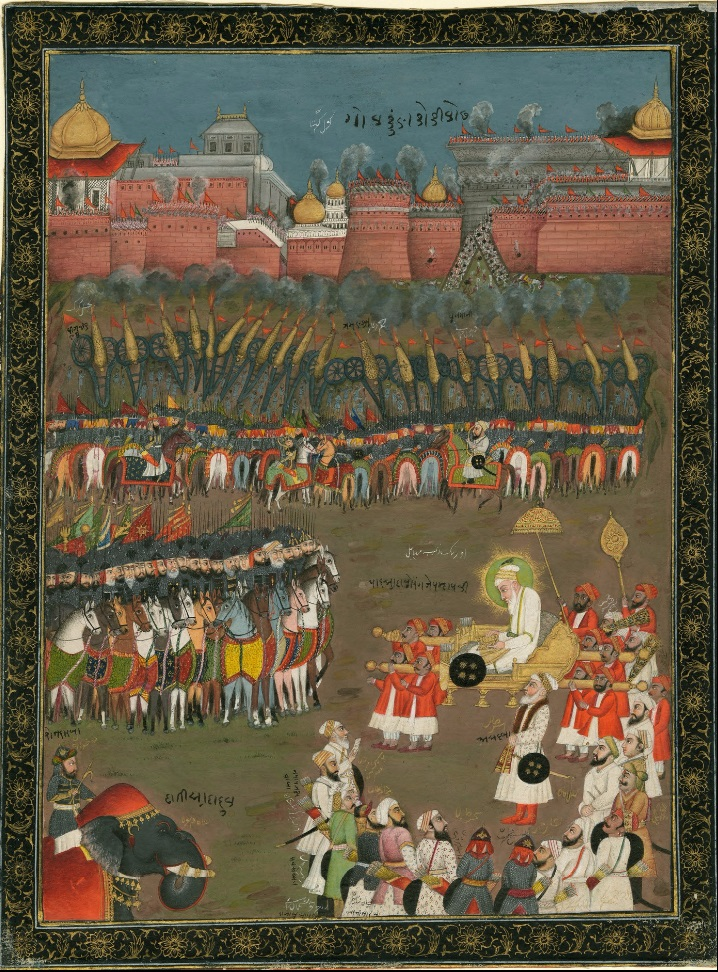
Aurangzeb during the Siege of Golconda. The Mughal victory over Golconda led to the end of the Qutb Shahi dynasty.

Mughal prince Aurangzeb spent most of his time in the Deccan, fighting local Hindu and Muslim kingdoms alike to establish Mughal sovereignty. The Golconda Sultanate faced various attacks by the Mughal prince Aurangzeb, who was appointed Viceroy of the Deccan by his father and Mughal Emperor Shah Jahan. It was forced to pay an annual tribute to the Mughal Empire.

In 1656, Aurangzeb attacked Golconda Fort by surprise but was forced to call off the siege on orders of Shah Jahan. Therefore, a treaty was signed between Abdullah Qutb Shah and Aurangzeb, when the former accepted Mughal sovereignty, paid an annual tribute and married his daughter to Aurangzeb's eldest son.

After becoming Mughal Emperor, Aurangzeb returned to the Deccan. He captured Hyderabad and besieged Golconda in 1687, and the refused any negotiations. On 22 September 1687, after a nine month long siege, Golconda was captured. Abul Hasan Qutb Shah was taken prisoner, and Hyderabad's diamond trade was all but destroyed.

== Nizams of Hyderabad ==
The Nizams of Hyderabad, also known as the Asaf Jahi dynasty, ruled Hyderabad State, (Note: Hyderabad State (1724–1948) is not to be confused with Hyderabad State (1948–1956). The former was a princely state ruled by the Nizams, and the latter was a state of the Republic of India) which comprised Telangana, Marathwada and Kalyana-Karnataka from 1724 to 1948. Under this period, Hyderabad State was the largest princely state in British India, and had its own mint, currency, railway and postal system. The Nizam acquired massive amounts of wealth due to the diamond trade.

=== Asaf Jah I ===
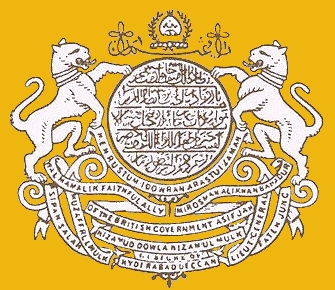
Coat of Arms of the Hyderabad State

With the emaciation of the Mughal Empire after Aurangzeb's death in 1707, the Mughal-appointed governors of the Deccan Suba (Deccan province) gained more autonomy from Delhi. In 1714, the Mughal Emperor Farrukhsiyar appointed Mir Qamar-ud-din Siddiqi as the viceroy to the Deccan and gave him the title of Nizam-ul-Mulk (governor of the country). He was well suited for the position as he had fought alongside his father and grandfather who were commanders during the siege of Hyderabad.

In 1724, he defeated Mubariz Khan to establish control over Hyderabad. He received the title of Asaf Jah from Mughal Emperor Muhammad Shah in the following year. Thus began the Asaf Jahi dynasty that would rule Hyderabad State until a year after India's independence from Britain.

=== Successors of Asaf Jah I ===
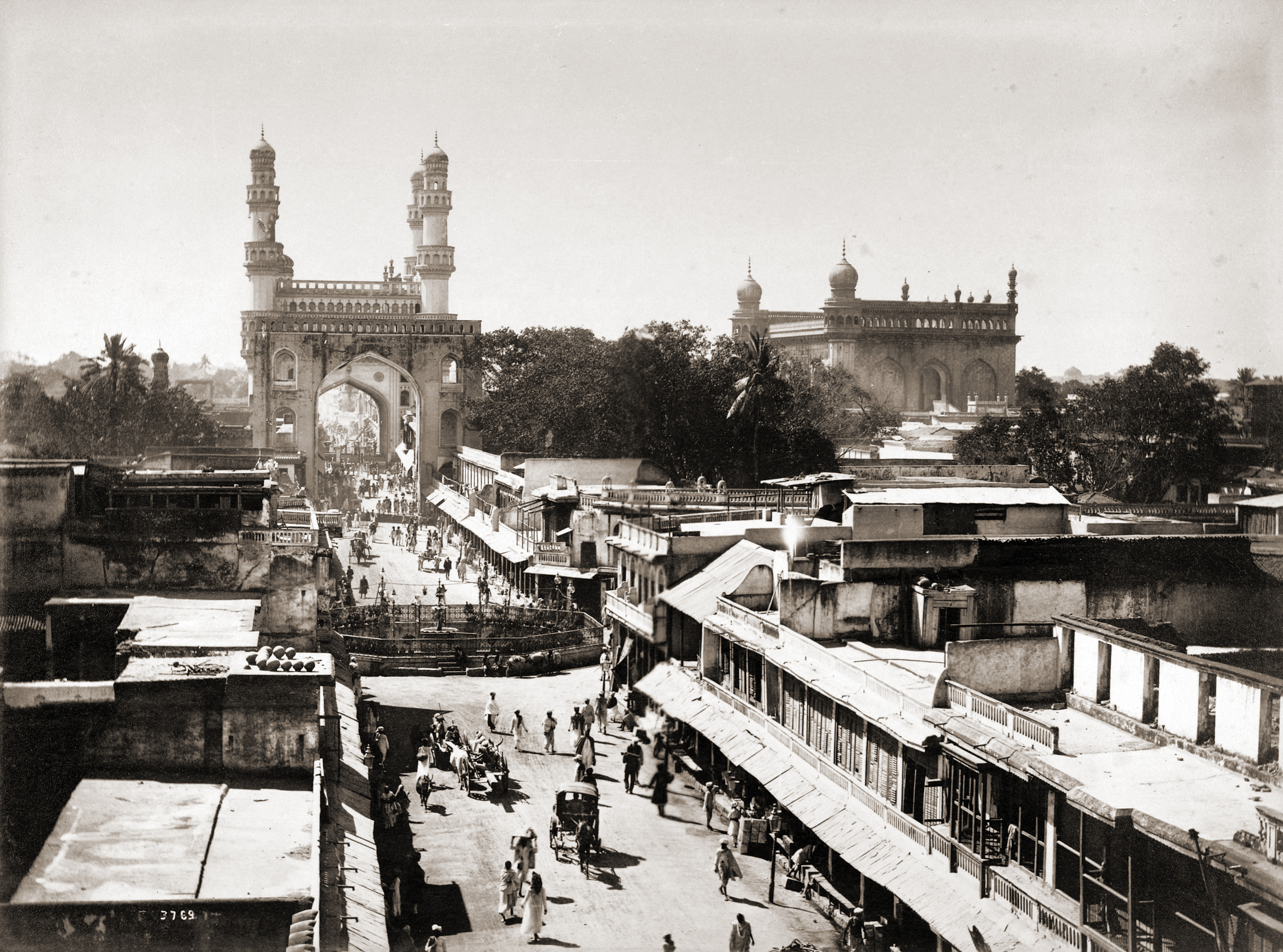
Charminar and its surroundings, photographed by Lala Deen Dayal in the 1880s.

When Asaf Jah I died in 1748, there was political unrest due to contention for the throne among his sons, who were aided by opportunistic neighbouring states and colonial foreign forces.

The death of Asaf Jah I in 1748 resulted in a period of political unrest as his sons, backed by opportunistic neighbouring states and colonial foreign forces, contended for the throne. The accession of Asif Jah II, who reigned from 1762 to 1803, ended the instability. In 1768 he signed the Treaty of Machilipatnam, surrendering the coastal region to the East India Company in return for a fixed annual rent.

In 1769 Hyderabad city became the formal capital of the Nizams. In response to regular threats from Hyder Ali (Dalwai of Mysore), Baji Rao I (Peshwa of the Maratha Empire), and Basalath Jung (Asaf Jah II's elder brother, who was supported by the Marquis de Bussy-Castelnau), the Nizam signed a subsidiary alliance with the East India Company in 1798, allowing the British Indian Army to occupy Bolarum (modern Secunderabad) to protect the state's capital, for which the Nizams paid an annual maintenance to the British.

When the British and the French spread their hold over the country, successive Nizams won their friendship without bequeathing their power. The Nizams allied themselves with each side at different times, playing a significant role in the Anglo-Mysore Wars.

The Northern Circars were effectively ceded to the British through a series of events culminating in the 1823 purchase of the Nizam of Hyderabad's claims, although the British had gained control much earlier, beginning in 1758. While the British East India Company had occupied the territory by 1758 after defeating the French, a definitive transfer of ownership from the Nizam was solidified in 1823.

Guntur was ceded to the British permanently in 1788. Although a treaty in 1768 had granted the British the Northern Circars, Guntur remained under the control of the Nizam's brother, Basalat Jang, until his death in 1782. It was not until 1788 that Guntur came under the British East India Company's administration.

The Ceded Region, currently known as Rayalaseema, was ceded to the British in 1800 by the Nizam of Hyderabad as part of a subsidiary alliance agreement. The area, which largely corresponds to the modern region of Rayalaseema, was transferred to the British East India Company.

As an offshoot of the Indian Rebellion of 1857, Maulvi Allauddin and Turrebaz Khan led attacks on the British Residency.

The Great Musi flood of 1908 ravaged the city of Hyderabad and resulted in the death of at least 15,000 people.

=== Last Nizam ===
In 1911, Mir Osman Ali Khan, the seventh and last Nizam of Hyderabad succeeded his father. He was widely known for his wealth and considered one of the wealthiest men of all time. The development of early modern Hyderabad took place during his reign.

Being a secular ruler, he is known for his donations and yearly grants towards various Hindu temples like Venkateswara Temple, Tirumala, Lakshmi Narasimha Temple, Yadadri. He also donated a grant of 1 Lakh Hyderabadi Rupees towards the reconstruction of Thousand Pillar Temple.

He also donated money and yearly grants for research work for 11 years for the compilation of the Hindu holy book "Mahabharata" at Bhandarkar Oriental Research Institute, Pune.

=== Telangana Rebellion ===
In late 1945, there started a peasant uprising in Telangana area, led by the Comrades Association (representing Communist Party of India) also known as The Telangana Rebellion or Vetti Chakiri Udyamam or Telangana Raithanga Sayudha Poratam. The communists drew their support from various quarters.

Among the poor peasants, there were grievances against the jagirdari system, which covered 43% of landholding. Initially, they also drew support from wealthier peasants who also fought under the communist banner, but by 1948, the coalition had disintegrated.

Initially, in 1945, the communists targeted zamindars and deshmukhs, but soon they launched a full-fledged revolt against the Nizam. Starting mid-1946, the conflict between the Razakars (a private militia led by Kasim Razvi) and the communists became increasingly violent, with both sides resorting to increasingly brutal methods. The Razakars cordoned off villages, captured suspected communists en masse and engaged in "absolutely indiscriminate and organised" (according to one Congressman) looting and massacres. According to an Indian government pamphlet, the communists had killed about 2,000 people by 1948.

== Post-Independence ==
India became independent from the United Kingdom in 1947. The Nizam of Hyderabad wanted to explore his options of independence from India, but was forced to cede his state to India in 1948 to form Hyderabad State.

=== Indian integration of Hyderabad ===
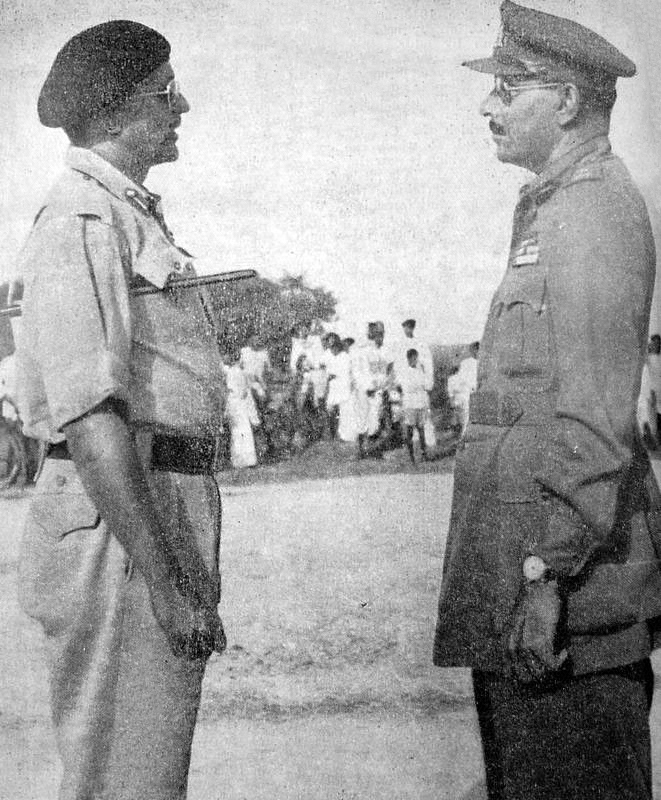
Major General Syed Ahmed El Edroos (at right) offers his surrender of the Hyderabad State Forces to Major General Joyanto Nath Chaudhuri at Secunderabad

Operation Polo, the code name of the Hyderabad "Police Action" was a military operation in September 1948 in which the Indian Armed Forces invaded the State of Hyderabad and overthrew its Nizam, annexing the state to India.

At the time of the Partition of India, the princely states of India, who in principle had self-government within their own territories, were subject to subsidiary alliances with the British, giving them control of their external relations. In the Indian Independence Act 1947 the British abandoned all such alliances, leaving the states with the option of opting for full independence. However, by 1948 almost all had acceded to either India or Pakistan. One major exception was that of Hyderabad, where the Nizam, a Muslim ruler, chose independence and hoped to maintain independence. The Nizam was also beset by the Telangana uprising, which he was unable to subjugate.

The Indian government, anxious to avoid what it termed a Balkanization of what had been the Indian Empire, was determined on the integration of Hyderabad State into the new Indian Union. Amidst atrocities by the Razakars, the Indian Home Minister Sardar Patel decided to annex Hyderabad in what was termed a "police action". The operation itself took five days, in which the Nizam's army were defeated easily.

The operation led to massive violence on communal lines. The Indian prime minister Jawaharlal Nehru appointed a commission known as the Sunderlal Committee. Its report, which was not released until 2013, concluded that "as a conservative estimate, 27,000 to 40,000 people had lost their lives during and after the police action."

=== Hyderabad State (1948–1956) ===
After Operation Polo, the Hyderabad State was formed and Mir Osman Ali Khan served as Rajapramukh and M. K. Vellodi was elected Chief Minister of Hyderabad State.

=== Andhra Pradesh (1956–2014) ===
In December 1953, the States Reorganisation Commission (SRC) was appointed to form states on a linguistic basis. An agreement was reached between Telangana leaders and Andhra leaders on 20 February 1956 to merge Telangana and Andhra with promises to safeguard Telangana's interests. After reorganization in 1956, the region of Telangana was merged with Andhra State to form Andhra Pradesh.

=== Telangana State (2014–present) ===
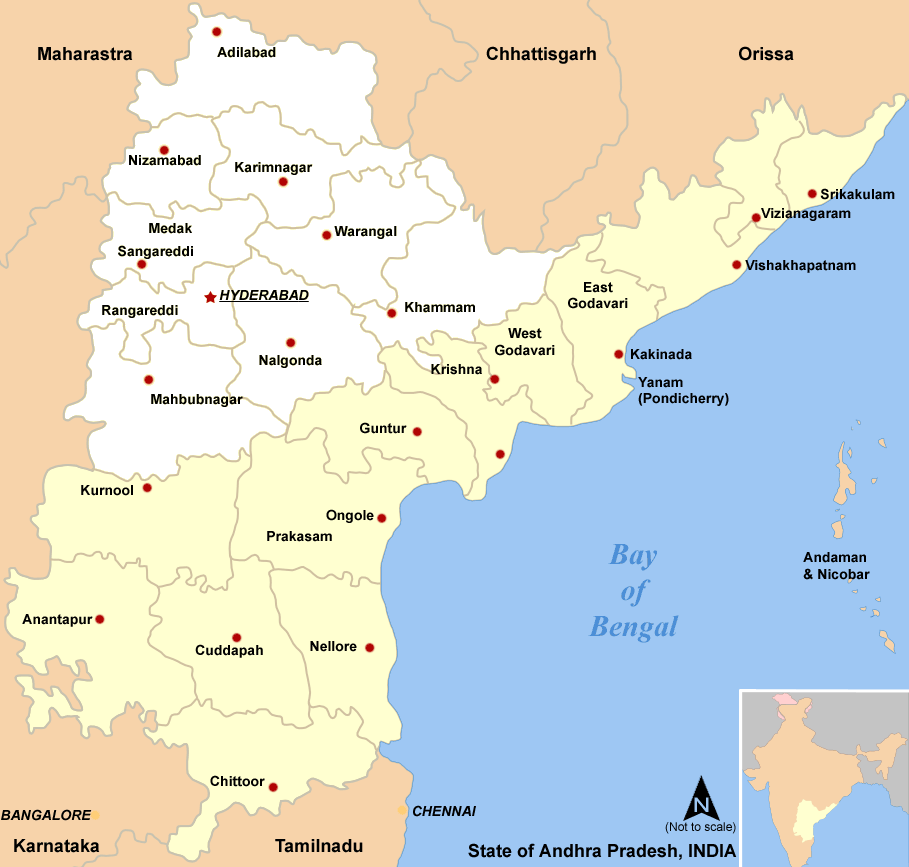
The former state of Andhra Pradesh prior to the 2014 bifurcation, with the districts separated to form Telangana in white, and those remaining in yellow

On 30 July 2013, the Congress Working Committee unanimously passed a resolution to recommend the formation of a separate Telangana state. After various stages the bill was placed in the Parliament of India in February 2014. In February 2014, Andhra Pradesh Reorganisation Act, 2014 bill was passed by the Parliament of India for the formation of Telangana state comprising ten districts from north-western Andhra Pradesh. The bill received the assent of the President on 1 March 2014.

The state of Telangana was officially formed on 2 June 2014. Kalvakuntla Chandrashekar Rao was elected as the first chief minister of Telangana, following elections in which the Bharat Rashtra Samithi party secured majority. Hyderabad will remain as the joint capital of both Telangana and Andhra Pradesh for a period, not more than 10 years.

== See also ==
- Culture of Telangana
- Nizam of Hyderabad
- History of the Telugu people
