= Kitty Kirkpatrick =

Anglo-Indian noble

Kitty Phillipps
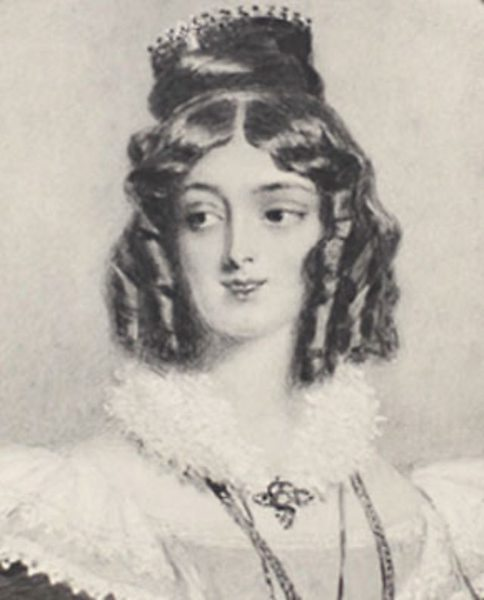
- A portrait of Katherine Kirkpatrick, ca. 1830
- Born: Noor un-Nissa, Sahib Begum; 9 April 1802; Hyderabad, Hyderabad Deccan
- Died: 2 March 1889 (aged 86); Torquay, Devon, United Kingdom
- Other name: Katherine Aurora Kirkpatrick
- Spouse: James Winslowe Phillipps (m. 1829; died 1875)
- Parents: James Achilles Kirkpatrick (father); Khair-un-Nissa Begum (mother)

Katherine Aurora "Kitty" Phillipps (née Kirkpatrick; 9 April 1802 – 2 March 1889) was a British woman of Anglo-Indian descent best known as a muse of the Scottish philosopher Thomas Carlyle, in several of his novels. Born in India to a British father and Princess Khair-un-Nissa of Hyderabad, who was likely of Persian descent, Kirkpatrick moved to England at a young age.

== Biography ==
=== Early life ===
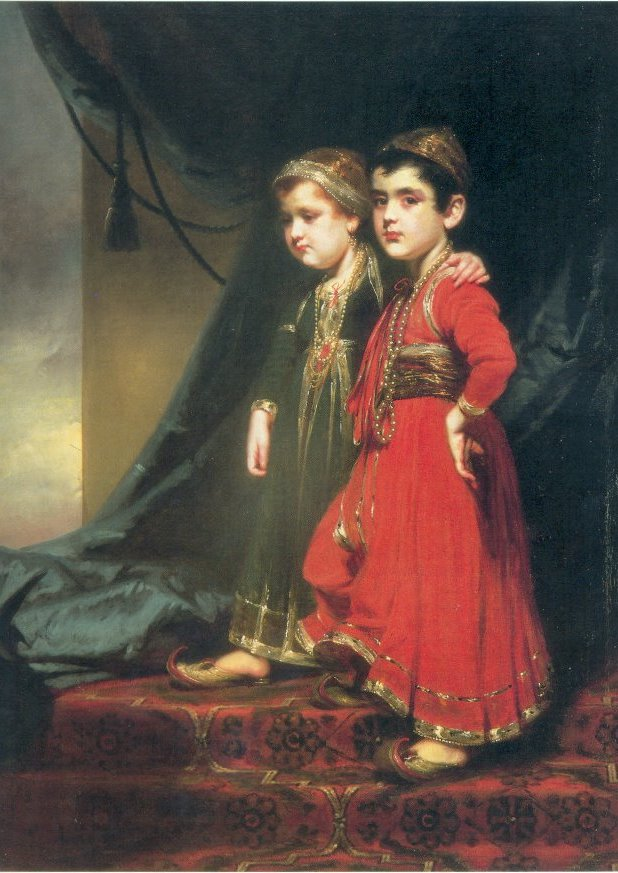
William and Katherine Aurora, children of Lieutenant-Colonel James Achilles Kirkpatrick

Kitty Kirkpatrick was born on 9 April 1802, in the city of Hyderabad which was located in the Hyderabad Deccan, a large principality in the southern Indian subcontinent under British paramountcy. Her father, James Achilles Kirkpatrick, was the East India Company Resident in Hyderabad and a colonel in the Presidency armies. Her mother, Khair-un-Nissa, was a Hyderabadi noblewoman and a Sayyida, a lineal descendant of the Muslim prophet Muhammad, whose grandfather served as the prime minister of Hyderabad. The two had met in the court of the Nizam of Hyderabad, and were married in an Islamic marriage ceremony. James, a Christian, underwent some degree of conversion to Islam in order to be permitted to marry Khair-un-Nissa, but is not clear whether the marriage or conversion were recognised as legal by either the Hyderabadi or Company authorities.

Kitty was initially named Noor un-Nissa, Sahib Begum ("Little Lady of High Lineage") and was raised alongside her elder brother William (known as Mir Ghulam Ali, Sahib Allum) in the mansion her father built, living in the zenana with her mother and maternal grandmother. James was a doting father and is known to have spent significant amounts of time with his family. In 1805, Kitty and William were sent to live in England at age three and five years, respectively, with their paternal grandfather, Colonel James Kirkpatrick. At the time, it was common for British families in India to send their children to Europe due to the high child mortality rates there, and a desire to for them to grow up in a British cultural environment. The English painter George Chinnery created a portrait of the siblings in Madras, shortly before they were sent to England. The two children were baptised as Christians on 25 March 1805, at St Mary's Church in London, and were thereafter known by their new Christian names, William George Kirkpatrick and Katherine Aurora "Kitty" Kirkpatrick. They never returned to India, nor did any members of their maternal family come to England to visit them.

James Kirkpatrick died on 15 October 1805, around 8 months after Kitty and William had left India. In his will, James describes William and Kitty as his "natural children," leaving large fortunes to each, and left money to his nieces and nephews, the children of his brother William Kirkpatrick, to whom he was deeply indebted for launching his career with the East India Company. William Kirkpatrick, who had needed to retire to England mid-career due to increasingly poor health, had arranged for James to step into his prestigious position as Resident at Hyderabad. James used his fortune to support William Kirkpatrick and his children out of his love for and gratitude toward his elder brother. Following James' death and the absence of her children, Khair-un-Nissa, who had lived in strict purdah during his lifetime, began a relationship with Henry Russell, one of James' assistants. Only 19 years-old at the time, Khair-un-Nissa was abandoned by Russell, destroying her reputation among the Hyderabadi elite and was forced into exile, unable to prevent greedy relatives from taking over the valuable landed estates she had inherited from her father.

=== Life in England ===
Kitty and her brother William had substantial sums settled on them by their mother, which allowed for them to be raised and educated in middle-class comfort in England, where Kitty was given a private education. In 1812, William suffered a severe burn injury resulting in the amputation of one of his arms, and became reclusive thereafter, though he successfully graduated from Oxford University in 1820, married, and had three daughters before his early death in 1828. Her brother's death, as well as that of her grandfather and other relations, left Kitty with a substantial inheritance, estimated at £50,000. After the death of her grandfather, Kirkpatrick lived with various of her married cousins: Clementina, Lady Louis; Julia, the wife of Edward Strachey; and (Barbara) Isabella, the wife of Charles Buller, a Member of Parliament and mother of Charles Buller junior.

Into adulthood Kitty became known for her attractiveness, and in 1822, while staying with the Bullers, she met the Scottish philosopher and historian, Thomas Carlyle, who was then employed as the Buller children's tutor and who swiftly became infatuated with Kirkpatrick. The romance was encouraged by another of Kitty's cousins, Julia (who married Edward Strachey, grandfather of the writer Lytton Strachey). However, Carlyle was impoverished and not believed by the rest of the family to be a suitable match for the wealthy and well-connected Kitty. Carlyle would later use Kitty as the basis for the Calypso-like Blumine in his novel Sartor Resartus and his memoirs, written many decades later, wrote a pen portrait of Kitty, describing her as:

a strangely complexioned young lady, with soft brown eyes and floods of bronze-red hair, really a pretty-looking, smiling, and amiable though most foreign bit of magnificence and kindly splendour.

— Thomas Carlyle, Reminiscences

On 21 November 1829, Kitty married James Winslowe Phillipps (1802–1859), a British Army officer in the 7th Hussars Regiment, and a member of the Kennaway family, which also had Indian connections. It was evidently a happy marriage, and Kirkpatrick and Phillipps went on to have seven children, of whom four survived to adulthood: Mary Augusta (1830–1909), John James (b. 1834), Emily Georgina (b. 1835), and Bertha Elizabeth (1840–1875).

=== Renewed contact with India ===
Kirkpatrick's paternal family had long forbidden her from maintaining any contact with her family in India. However, with the help of Henry Russell, her father's former assistant and her mother's ex-lover, Kirkpatrick was able to re-establish contact with her maternal grandmother after almost four decades of separation. Although they were never physically re-united, the two women were correspondents on a regular and often emotional basis for six years.

Kirkpatrick's letters make it clear that despite leaving India and her mother at such a young age, she still retained vivid memories of it:

I often think of you and remember you and my dear mother. I often dream that I am with you in India and that I see you both in the room you used to sit in. No day of my life has ever passed without my thinking of my dear mother. I can remember the verandah and the place where the tailors worked and a place on the house top where my mother used to let me sit down and slide. When I dream of my mother I am in such joy to have found her again that I awake, or else am pained in finding that she cannot understand the English I speak. I can well recollect her cries when we left her and I can now see the place where she sat when we parted, and her tearing her long hair. What worlds would I give to possess one lock of that beautiful and much loved hair! How dreadful to think that so many, many years have passed when it would have done my heart such good to think that you loved me & when I longed to write to you & tell you these feelings that I was never able to express, a letter which I was sure would have been detained & now how wonderful it is that after 35 years I am able for the first time to hear that you think of me, and love me, and have perhaps wondered why I did not write to you, and that you have thought me cold and insensible to such near dear ties.

— Katherine Kirkpatrick, (quoted in White Mughals), 386-87

== Popular culture ==
Kirkpatrick's story has been the subject of renewed interest by 21st-century historians, notably William Dalrymple in his 2002 book White Mughals.
