= Bruce Wannell =

English translator and linguist (1953–2020)

Bruce Wannell (25 August 1953 – 29 January 2020) was an English polyglot, translator, linguist, and traveller. His expertise was on the Persianate regions, particularly Iran and Afghanistan. He occasionally lectured at the School of Oriental and African Studies, University of London, particularly on Persian poetry.

Wannell read French and German at Oriel College of the University of Oxford. He spoke Persian with a poetic fluency, and additionally could talk in Arabic, Pushtu, Urdu and Swahili. He had knowledge of Amharic, Spanish and Greek, and could lecture in French, Italian and German.

Historian William Dalrymple dedicated his book White Mughals to Wannell for the latter's help with translation of source texts in Persian and for providing insight with deep knowledge of the Muslim world.

Wannell died on January 29, 2020. An obituary was published in The Times. A book about his life was published later that year. Hugh Thomson, writing in his obituary of Wannell for The Spectator, compared him to the British literary critic Eric Griffiths. Dalrymple stated that Wannell's standards were so high that he found it difficult to write anything that matched them and that his output did not reflect his erudition, with many commissioned books never seeing the light of day.
