= The Last Mughal =

2006 non-fiction book by William Dalrymple

- Author: William Dalrymple
- Language: English
- Subject: Narrative history
- Genre: Non-fiction
- Publisher: Bloomsbury Publishing
- Publication date: 2006
- Publication place: United Kingdom
- Media type: Print (hardcover, paperback)
- Pages: 575 pp.
- ISBN: 978-0670999255
- OCLC: 70402016
- Preceded by: Begums Thugs and White Mughals
- Followed by: Nine Lives: In Search of the Sacred in Modern India

The Last Mughal: The Fall of a Dynasty, Delhi 1857 is a 2006 historical book by William Dalrymple. It deals with the life of poet-emperor Bahadur Shah Zafar (1775–1862) and the unsuccessful Indian Rebellion of 1857, which he participated in, challenging the British East India Company's rule over India. This was a major act of resistance against the British Empire, finally resulting in the replacement of the nominal Mughal monarch with the British monarch as the Emperor of India.

== Summary ==
The Last Mughal: The Fall of a Dynasty, Delhi 1857 mainly analyzes the life and reign of Bahadur Shah II, the last Mughal emperor, as a means to contextualize the final years of the Mughal Empire. Additionally, Dalrymple focuses on the events surrounding the Indian Rebellion of 1857, or the Sepoy Mutiny, and the fall of Delhi. By turning to Persian and Urdu archival sources, along with British records, Dalyrmple presents the perspectives of both British and Indian partakers. He essentially rebuilds the cultural, military, and political history of Delhi during the fall of Mughal rule.

Before delving into the uprising, the book opens with a description of Delhi as a cultural and intellectual hub in northern India — even though the Mughal Empire had been experiencing political decline for a few decades. Imperial authority had mostly become ceremonial due to the growing influence of the East India Company. Still, in Bahadur Shah Zafar's court, architecture, Sufi learning, Urdu poetry, music, Persian scholarship, and more were all supported and flourished. Hence, Dalrymple emphasizes the emperor as one with great cultural prestige rather than political power. The narrative also explores the dynamics between the Mughal court, the British community, Delhi's Muslim and Hindu elites, and the East India Company's political residents. Dalrymple argues that increasing cultural and religious mistrust led to a worsening of Indo-British relations which had previously been somewhat cooperative.

Dalrymple notes the following tensions that preceded the rebellion: British annexation policies, lowering Mughal privileges, missionary activity, the Bengal Army's military grievances, and fear that the East India Company planned to interfere with Indian religious traditions.

== Critical response ==
The book, Dalrymple's sixth, and his second to reflect his long love affair with the city of Delhi, won praise for its use of "The Mutiny Papers", which included previously ignored Indian accounts of the events of 1857. He worked on these documents in association with the Urdu scholar Mahmood Farooqui.

The book also won the 2006 Duff Cooper Memorial Prize for History and Biography, and the 2007 Vodafone Crossword Book Award.

Geoffrey Moorhouse of The Guardian wrote,

Dalrymple has here written an account of the Indian mutiny such as we have never had before, of the events leading up to it and of its aftermath, seen through the prism of the last emperor's life. He has vividly described the street life of the Mughal capital in the days before the catastrophe happened, he has put his finger deftly on every crucial point in the story, which earlier historians have sometimes missed, and he has supplied some of the most informative footnotes I have ever read. On top of that, he has splendidly conveyed the sheer joy of researching a piece of history, something every true historian knows, telling of his elation at discovering in Burma's national archives all Zafar's prison records, stored in Acrobat PDF files - "something the British Library has so far failed to achieve."

Aamer Hussein of The Independent noted,

Dalrymple's recreation of the city of Delhi under siege forms the monumental backdrop to the tragic figure of the eponymous monarch, the "last Mughal." Aged 82 and abidingly fond of the arts of peace, Bahadur Shah Zafar was chosen as a mascot by an army seen as rebels and mutineers by the British, and as freedom fighters by some nationalist historians.
