= White Mughals =

2002 book by William Dalrymple

- Author: William Dalrymple
- Language: English
- Subject: Narrative history
- Publisher: Penguin Books
- Publication date: 29 March 2002
- Publication place: United Kingdom
- Media type: Print (Hardcover, Paperback)
- Pages: 512 pp (Paperback edition)
- ISBN: 0-14-200412-X
- OCLC: 55121980
- Preceded by: The Age of Kali
- Followed by: Begums Thugs And White Mughals

White Mughals is a 2002 history book by William Dalrymple. It is Dalrymple's fifth major book, and tells the true story of a love affair that took place in early nineteenth century Hyderabad between James Achilles Kirkpatrick and Khair-un-Nissa Begum.

== Summary ==
The book is a work of social history about the warm relations that existed between the British and some Indians in the 18th and early 19th century, when one in three British men in India was married to an Indian woman. It documents the inter-ethnic liaisons between British officers, such as Charles "Hindoo" Stuart, and Indian women, and the geopolitical context of late 18th century India. Like Dalrymple's From the Holy Mountain, it also examines the interactions of Christianity and Islam, emphasizing the surprisingly porous relationship between the two in pre-modern times.

At the heart of White Mughals is the story of the affair which saw a British dignitary, the East India Company Resident in Hyderabad, Captain James Achilles Kirkpatrick, convert to Islam and marry Khair-un-Nissa, a Hyderabadi noblewoman of royal Mughal descent. As the British Resident in Hyderabad, Kirkpatrick is shown to balance the requirements of his employers, the East India Company, with his sympathetic attitude to the Nizam of Hyderabad.

The very title of White Mughals indicates its subject: the late 18th- and early 19th-century period in India, where there had been ‘a succession of unexpected and unplanned minglings of peoples and cultures and ideas’. On one level, the book tells the tragic love story of James Kirkpatrick, ‘the thoroughly orientalised’ British Resident in Hyderabad and Khair, a beautiful young Muslim noblewoman. On another level, the story is about trade, military and political dealings, based on Dalrymple's researches among letters, diaries, reports, and dispatches (much of it in cipher). Out of these sources he draws a fascinating picture of sexual attitudes and social etiquette, finding an "increasingly racist and dismissive attitude" among both Europeans and Indians towards mixed race offspring after the rise of Evangelical Christianity. He paces the gradual revelations with a novelist's skills, leading us on, after the death of Kirkpatrick, to "the saddest and most tragic part of the whole story". The doomed lovers actually engender an optimistic coda, when their two children move to Britain. The daughter Kitty becomes a friend and muse of Scottish writer and philosopher Thomas Carlyle, and re-establishes contact with her grandmother in India through Henry Russell.

== Production ==
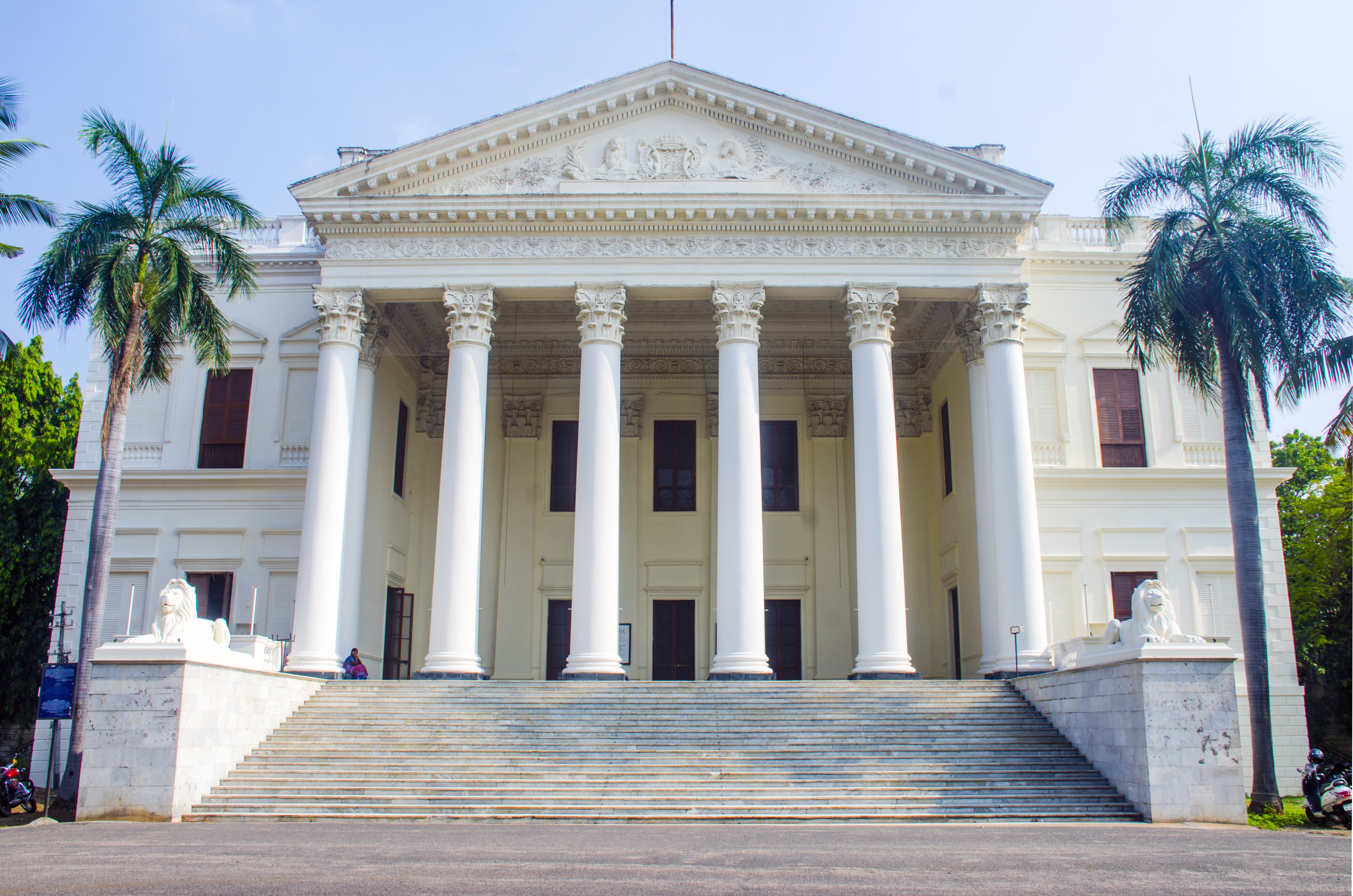
Resident of James Achilles Kirkpatrick at Hyderabad

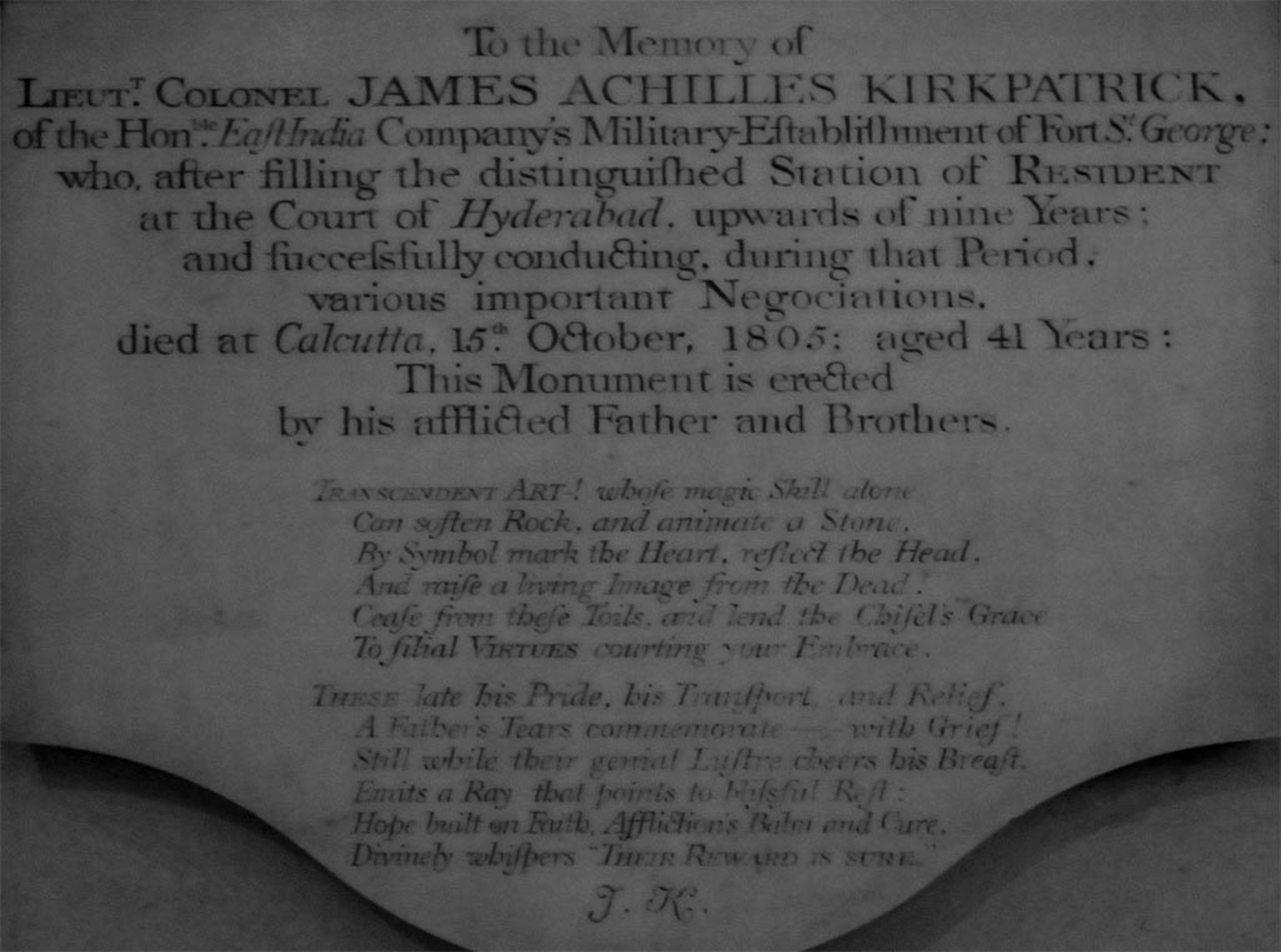
Memorial of James Achilles Kirkpatrick at St. John's Church, Kolkata by John Bacon

Memoirs and chronicles in Urdu and Persian (the court language of India at the time) were used as sources for the writing of the book. Dalrymple collected these by retrieving them from the cellars and back rooms of secondhand booksellers in India. Dalrymple originally hoped to write a positive story about the East India Company but soured on the subject as he dove into the group's activities in India. He dedicated the book to Bruce Wannell for the latter's help with translation of source texts in Persian and for providing insight into the Muslim world.

== Popular culture and adaptations ==
In August 2011, William Dalrymple said that film rights to White Mughals had been sold to Rainmark Films and that Ralph Fiennes was interested in directing and starring. Nothing seems to have come of this project.

In 2015 a BBC documentary was released which retold the story specifically of Khair-un-Nissa Begum and Kirkpatrick and was presented by Dalrymple.

== See also ==
- Claude Martin
- Antoine Polier
- Anglo-Indian
- White Rajahs
