= James Achilles Kirkpatrick =

Madras Army officer (1764–1805)

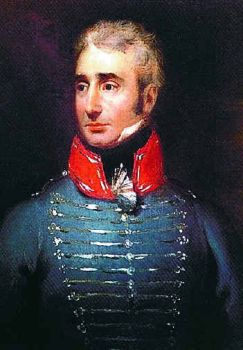
- c. 1805 portrait of Kirkpatrick by George Chinnery
- Born: 1764; Fort St. George, Madras
- Died: 15 October 1805 (aged 40–41); Calcutta, Bengal Presidency
- Occupation: Army officer
- Known for: Built the historic Koti Residency in Hyderabad, a landmark and major tourist attraction. Documented interracial love affair and marriage between him and Indian noblewoman Khair-un-Nissa Begum.
- Spouse: Khair-un-Nissa Begum
- Children: Kitty Kirkpatrick; William Kirkpatrick
- Father: Colonel James Kirkpatrick
- Relatives: William Kirkpatrick (brother)

Lieutenant-Colonel James Achilles Kirkpatrick (1764 – 15 October 1805) was a Madras Army officer who served as the Resident at Hyderabad Deccan from 1798 until 1805. Kirkpatrick also ordered the construction of the Koti Residency in Hyderabad, which has since come to serve as a major tourist attraction.

== Biography ==
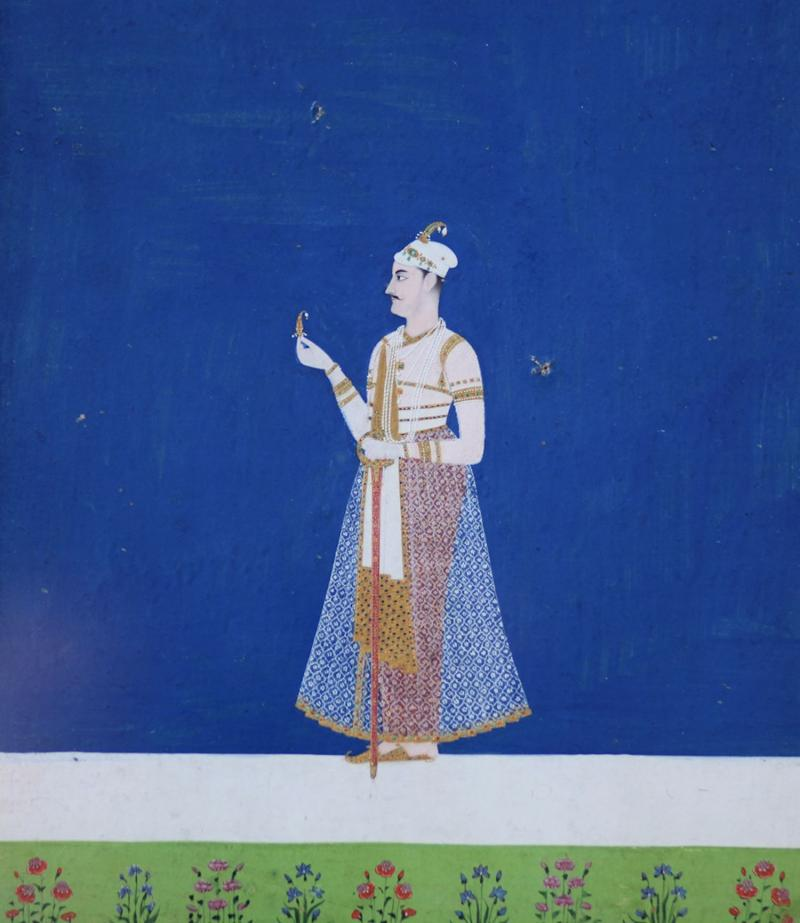
Kirkpatrick in Mughal dress similar to what he would have worn at his marriage to Khair-un-Nissa, painted by the Hyderabadi court painter and friend of Kirkpatrick's Tajallī ʻAlī Shāh

James Achilles Kirkpatrick was born in 1764 at Fort St George, Madras. He replaced his brother William and arrived in Hyderabad in 1795 to assume the position of Resident, which had previously been held by his brother. During his initial few months in Hyderabad, James became enamoured with the Indo-Persian culture at the Nizam of Hyderabad's court, and substituted his European dress for Persian attire.

Although a lieutenant colonel in the Madras Army, Kirkpatrick wore Mughal-style clothing at home, smoked a hookah, chewed betelnut, enjoyed nautch parties, and maintained a small harem in his zenanakhana. Born in India, Kirkpatrick was educated in Britain, spoke Tamil as his first language, wrote poetry in Urdu, and added Persian and Hindustani to his "linguistic armoury".

With fluency in Hindustani and Persian, he openly mingled with the social elite of Hyderabad. Kirkpatrick was adopted by the Nizam of Hyderabad, who invested him with many titles: mutamin ul mulk ('Safeguard of the kingdom'), hushmat jung ('Valiant in battle'), nawab fakhr-ud-dowlah bahadur ('Governor, pride of the state, and hero').

== Marriage ==
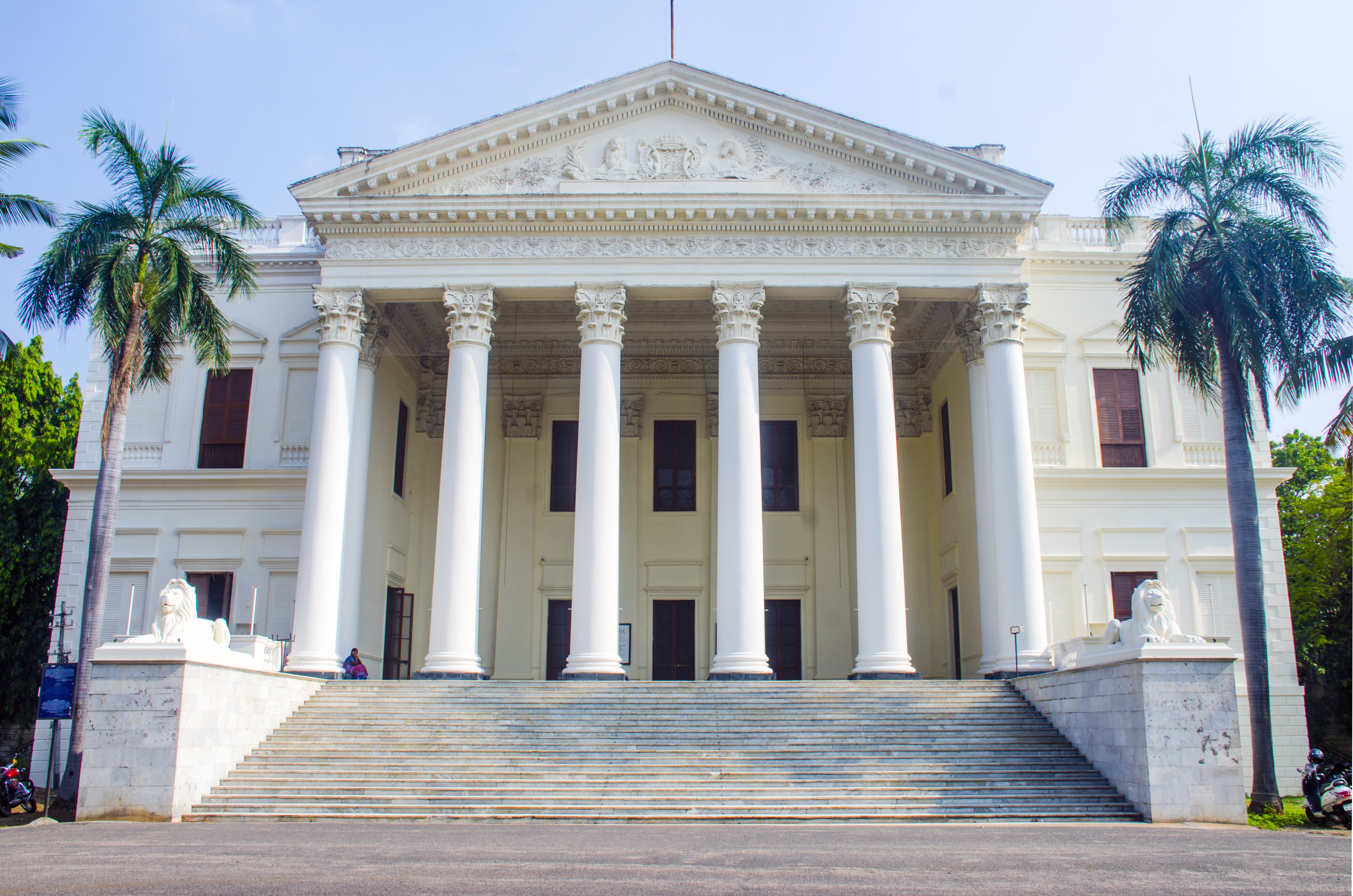
Residence of Kirkpatrick at Hyderabad, now the Veeranari Chakali Ilamma Women's University

In 1800, in a strictly private Muslim marriage ceremony Kirkpatrick wed Khair-un-Nissa, who was fourteen years old, not an unusual age for a girl of her social class to be married. She was the granddaughter of Nawab Mahmood Ali Khan, the prime minister of Hyderabad. However, the marriage was not recorded and does not appear to have been legally valid; in his will he described the offspring of the relationship as his "natural" children, a polite euphemism for illegitimate children that a father recognized as his own offspring. In his will, Kirkpatrick emphasized his devotion to Khair-un-Nissa, stipulating that he left her only a token bequest in light of the fact that in addition to her jewels, she possessed a large, landed fortune inherited from her father, leaving large fortunes to their two children instead. Before their father's unexpected, early death, at ages 3 and 5, the children had been sent to be reared by Kirkpatrick's relatives in England, as was usual among the British families in India in that period.

"Hashmat Jang was believed by some of his Muslim staff and by the bride's female relations to secretly embraced Islam before a Shi'a Mujtahid (cleric); he is said to have presented a certificate from him to Khair-un-Nissa Begum, who sent it to her mother." Towards the end of autumn of 1801, a major scandal broke out in Calcutta over Kirkpatrick's behaviour at the Hyderabad court. A scandal arose due to the ethnically and racially mixed nature of the marriage.

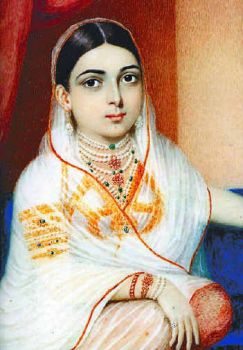
c. 1805 portrait of Khair-un-Nissa by George Chinnery

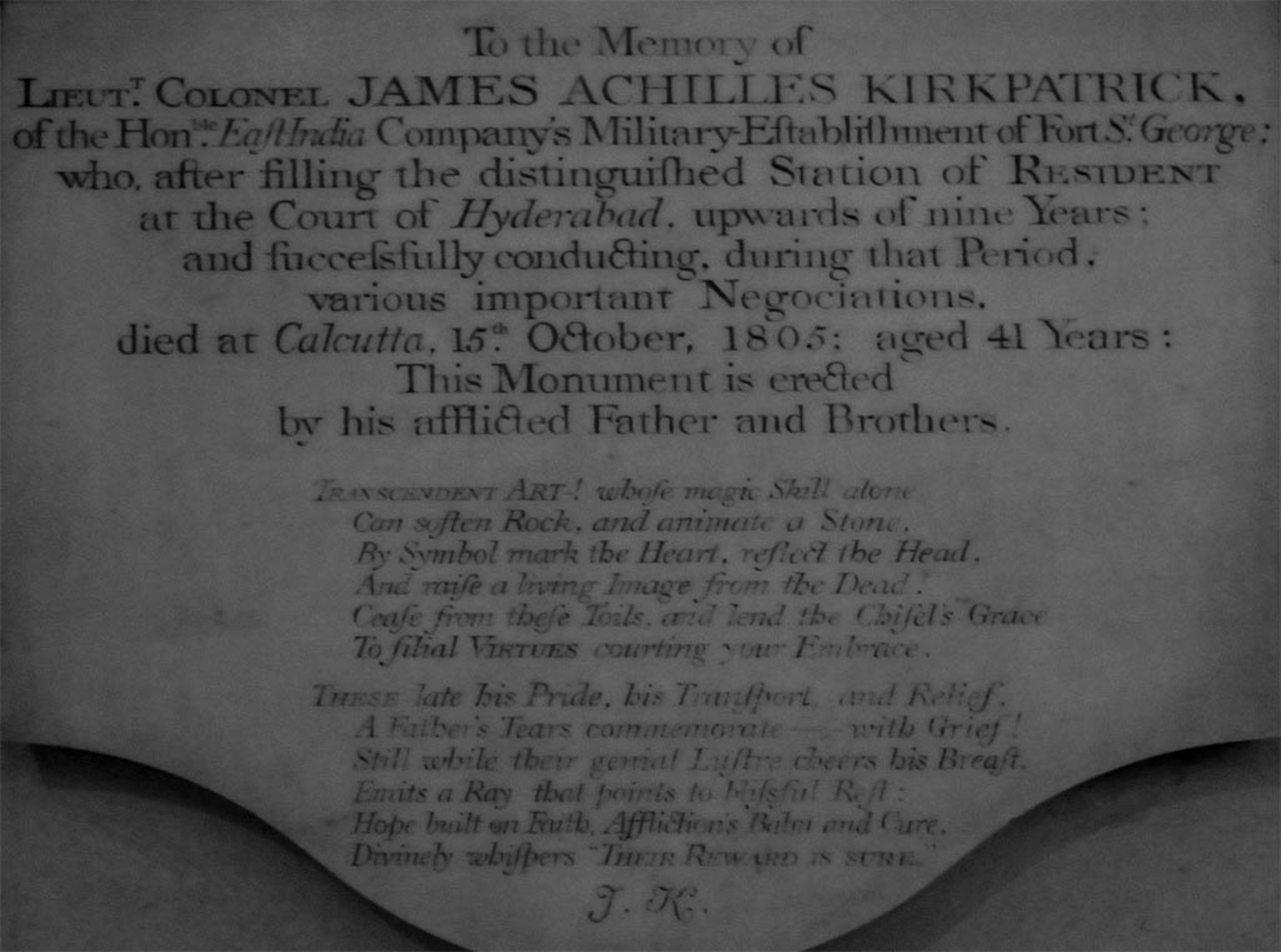
Memorial of James Achilles Kirkpatrick at St. John's Church, Kolkata by John Bacon

The conditions under which Kirkpatrick operated as Resident were affected by Lord Richard Wellesley’s appointment as Governor-General of India. Wellesley favored taking a assertive diplomatic stance with the Nizam, which included reducing the amount of autonomy he wielded. In addition, Wellesley strongly disapproved of Kirkpatrick's marriage to Khair-un-Nissa.

After Kirkpatrick died in Calcutta on 15 October 1805, Khair-un-Nissa, who was only 19 years old, had a brief love affair with Kirkpatrick's assistant, Henry Russell, who would become the Resident in Hyderabad in 1810. After what Russell appears to have regarded as a brief fling, he abandoned Khair-un-Nissa who, with her reputation now ruined, was unable to prevent greedy relatives from taking over the valuable landed estates she had inherited from her father. Russell married a half-Portuguese woman. Although she, as a disgraced woman consequent to the love affair with Russell, was not allowed by her family to return to Hyderabad for some years, after the death of a senior male relative she was eventually allowed to return, and died in Hyderabad on 22 September 1813 aged 27.

Kirkpatrick and Khair-un-Nissa together had two children: a son, Mir Ghulam Ali Sahib Allum and a daughter, Noor-un-Nissa Sahib Begum. Their father had sent them to England to live with their grandfather Colonel James Kirkpatrick, in London and Keston, Kent, shortly before his own, unexpected death at a young age. The two children were baptised on 25 March 1805 at St. Mary’s Church, Marylebone Road, and were thereafter known by their new Christian names, William George Kirkpatrick and Katherine Aurora "Kitty" Kirkpatrick. William was disabled in 1812 after falling into a copper of boiling water and had to have an arm amputated; he married and had three children but died in 1828 aged 27. Kitty was for a few years the love interest of the Scottish writer and philosopher Thomas Carlyle, then a young tutor of no fortune, an ineligible match for an heiress. She married Captain James Winslowe Phillipps and they had seven children. She died in Torquay, Devon, in 1889.

== Popular culture ==
A large part of White Mughals, a book by the historian William Dalrymple, concerns Kirkpatrick's relationship with Khair-un-Nissa.
