= David William Keith Barr =

Lieutenant-Colonel Sir David William Keith Barr, KCSI (died 1916) was a British Army officer and member of the Indian Political Service. He served as resident at Kashmir and Hyderabad.

In retirement, Barr was a member of the Council of India.
