= Osmania University College for Women =

University in Hyderabad, India

Veeranari Chakali Ilamma Women's University
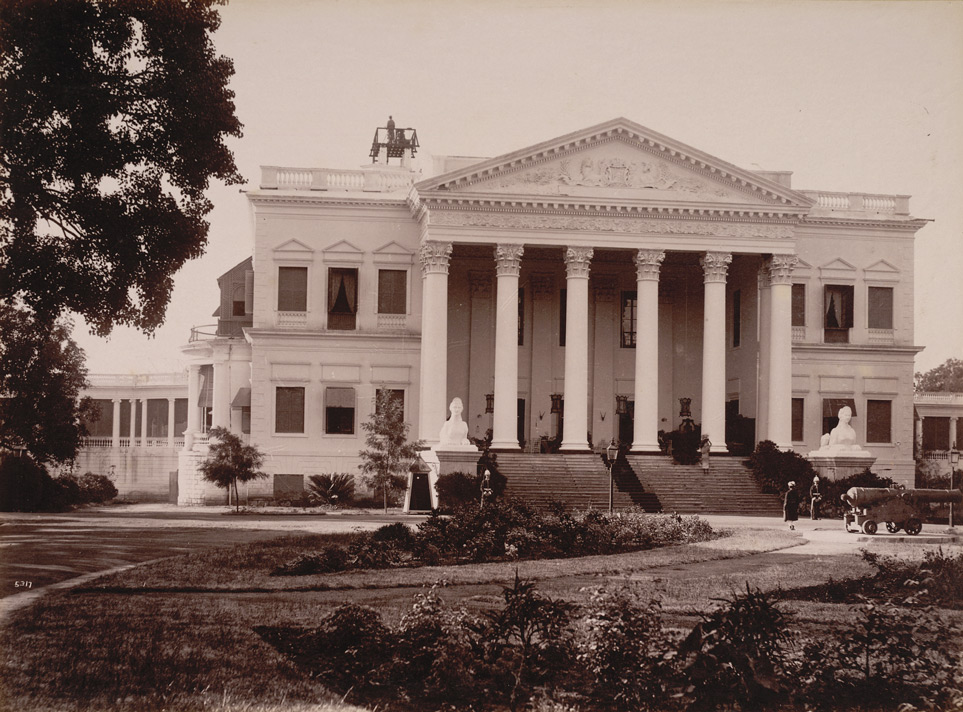
- Former names: Osmania University College for Women; Telangana Mahila Viswavidyalayam
- Type: Women's University
- Established: 1924 (as OU Women's College); 2022 (as university)
- Vice-Chancellor: Surya Dhananjay (I/C)
- Location: Koti, Sultan Bazaar, Hyderabad, Telangana, 500095, India; 17.3837299°N 78.4863937°E
- Campus: Urban
- Website: www.oucwkoti.ac.in
- Location within Hyderabad Location within Telangana Location within India

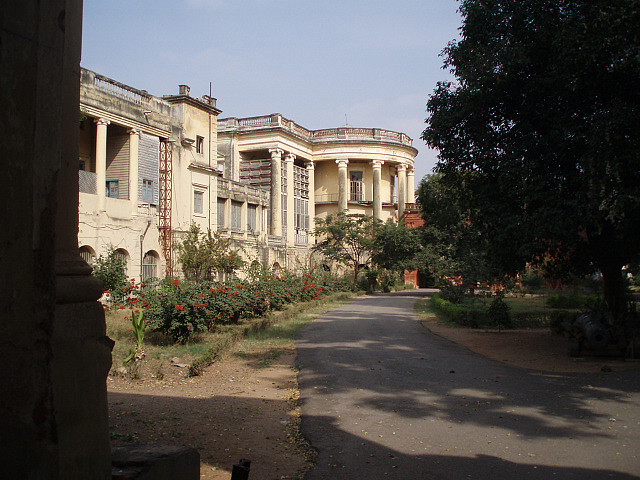
Koti Women's College

Veeranari Chakali Ilamma Women's University, formerly Osmania University College for Women, is a state university in Hyderabad, India.

Established in the year 1924, it is one of the oldest institutions of higher learning for women in India. It is the first women's university in the Telangana state of India.

University College for Women is a constituent college of Osmania University, with autonomous status since 1989. It is accredited ‘Five Stars’ in the first cycle and ‘A’ Grade in the next two cycles of NAAC. CPE Status (Third Cycle) renewed in the year 2016-17

== History ==
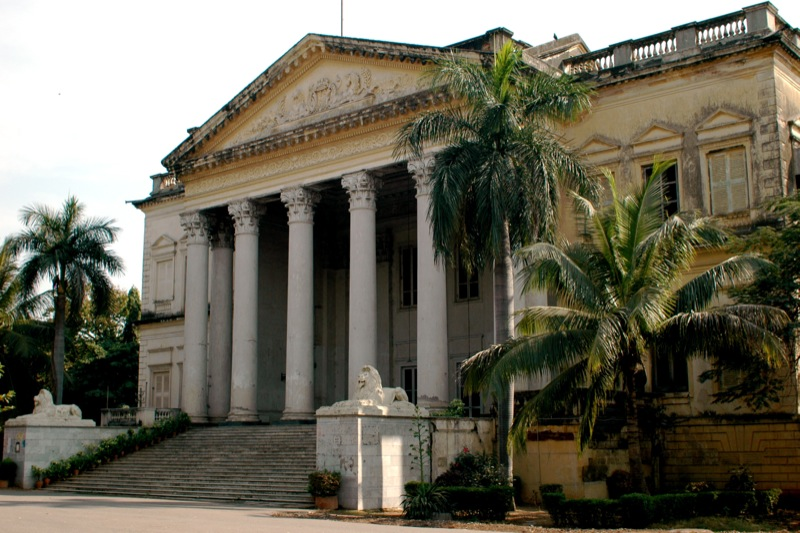
Former Koti Residency.

The Nizam Government during the reign of H.E.H. the Sevent Nizam Sir Mir Osman Ali Khan Bahadur cotemplated to start a separate college for girls and subsequently the Zenena Intermediate College of Girls was started in 1924 with just 7 students in the premises of what was then the Nampally Girls School located in the "Golden Threshold", also a former home of Sarojini Naidu. In 1932, the Intermediate Science Course was started and in 1935, the bachelor degree courses in Arts and Social Sciences were added and the college was affiliated to Osmania University with the campus within the university. In 1941 B.Ed Degree and B.Sc. (Domestic Science) were introduced which has now been replaced by the BA and B.Sc. courses.

With the aim of making education more available to girl students, the Nizam proposed to shift the campus within the city precincts. A committee was formed headed by Sir Mehdi Yar Jung Syed Mehdi Husain Bilgrami, who was the finance minister of the Nizam government, Nawab ZainYar Jung Bahadur, and Begum ZainYar Jung S. Ruquiyya Bilgrami. Upon the committee's recommendation, in 1949, the campus shifted to its present location British Residency that was erstwhile residency of British colonel James Achilles Kirkpatrick.

In 2022, the college was upgraded to a state university, called Telangana Mahila Viswavidyalayam. It had plans to start offering engineering courses. In 2024 the college was once again renamed as Veeranari Chakali Ilamma Women's University after Telangana armed struggle leader Chakali Ilamma.

== Campus ==
The campus is spread over 42 acres.

The main building of this college, which was part of the British legacy in India, is a monument of great aesthetic, architectural and historical importance. Commissioned in 1803 for the British army officer, J. A. Kirkpatrick, his builder Lt. Samuel Russell of the Madras Engineers, has produced a structure capable of rivaling the Governor's house in Kolkata.

The architecture style is of Palladian style villa bearing a close resemblance to Governor house in Calcutta built for Governor Wellesley that in turn resembles the building style of St. Petersburg Palace in Russia.

The building is with a classical pedimented portico supported by six Corinthian columns in the neo-classical style.

The college building has been included in the list of heritage structures compiled by INTACH. World Monuments Fund has included the building in its 2025 World Monuments Watch.

The beautiful campus has also been a favourite spot for shooting of Telugu films. Some of the popular movies shot in the campus include Gopala Gopala, Bhola Shankar, Guntur Karam.

== Academics ==
Women's College offers graduate and postgraduate courses for women. Post graduate courses were started from 1979. In 1988, the college was granted Autonomous status by the UGC. From 1993 additional post graduate specialized courses were introduced such as Masters in Computer Applications (MCA), Masters in Business Administration (MBA). Presently, the College offers various Undergraduate Courses (regular & self-finance programs) and 13 Post Graduate Programs along with four Diploma and two Certificate Courses.

The college was upgraded to the status of university in April 2022 and holds NAAC A grade. Today it caters to a large number of first-generation learners; about 4000 students from most of the districts of the newly constituted state of Telangana.

== Notable alumni ==
| Name | Profession |
|---|---|
| Ranjana Kumar | Former Chairperson and MD of Indian Bank |
| B Chandrakala | Indian Civil Officer - IAS |
| B V Nandini Reddy | Indian Film Director and screenwriter |
| Anuradha Reddy | Convenor, INTACH |
| Kompella Madavilatha | Indian Politician |

== Notable Visitors and Guests ==
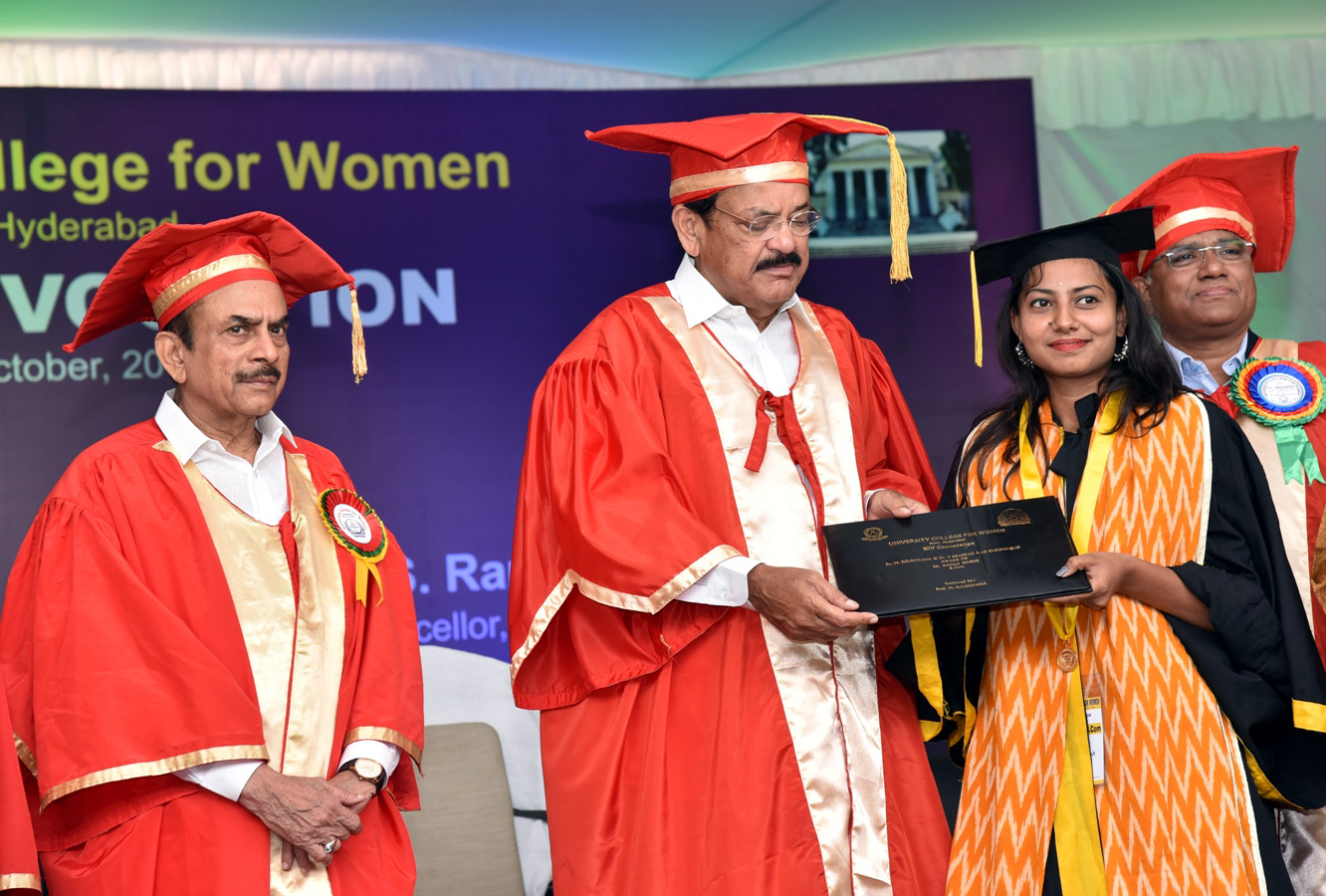
M. Venkaiah Naidu, Vice President of India presenting gold medals to the college students at the XIV Convocation

XIVth Convocation of the college was held on 4 October 2018 at the college premises. It was presided by the Honourable Vice-president of India, Shri M. Venkaiah Naidu.

== See also ==
- Veeranari Chakali Ilamma Women's University
- Education in India
- Literacy in India
- List of institutions of higher education in Telangana
