= B. Chandrakala =

Indian civil officer

- Born: Bhukhya Chandarakala Niru; 27 September 1979 (age 46); Karimnagar, Andhra Pradesh, India
- Other name: Lady Dabang
- Education: Koti Women's College (B.A); Osmania University (M.A.)
- Occupation: Bureaucrat
- Years active: 2008–present
- Employer: Government of India

Bhukhya Chandarakala Niru (born 27 September 1979), also known as B. Chandrakala, is an Indian Administrative Service (IAS) officer of 2008 batch in Uttar Pradesh. She is known for taking action against her subordinates, mostly due to her widely circulated videos in which she went on surprise inspections, pulling up civic officials over lack of quality in building material or poor sanitation. She also went viral for threatening sister and mother of a reporter with visit of unscrupulous elements to the house of the reporter and create unsafe atmosphere for the sister and mother. Overall she is famous for corruption and high handedness.

B. Chandrakala has served as district collector and district magistrate of Hamirpur, Mathura, Bulandshahr, Bijnor and Meerut. Since March 2021 she is posted as special secretary in Lucknow.

== Early life and education ==
B Chandarakala was born on 27 September 1979 in Karimnagar, Telangana, India to B. Kishan, a retired senior-technician at Fertilizer Corporation of India, and his wife B. Lakshmi, an entrepreneur. She is the third daughter of four siblings, having two older brothers, B. Raghuveer, B. Mahaveer, and a younger sister, B. Meena, a beautician. She completed her schooling at Central School and continued her education till marriage. She graduated with a Bachelor of Arts Degree in Geography from the Osmania University, Hyderabad and also obtained a Postgraduate degree in Economics from this university.

== Career ==
B Chandarakala is serving as an IAS officer from the year 2008. She implemented all the government schemes like social welfare, tree plantation, animal husbandry, environment and panchayat related welfare schemes. She has been transferred to various places even though, her hard work and ability established her success in new dimensions at every place. She worked as an SDM and CDO in Allahabad from the year 2009 to 2012. She is an internet phenomenon and a very active member of social networking. During an inspection of road construction work, she scolded the authorities for their negligences in the public place. The video of her shouting at the officials and contractors, for inferior workmanship in UP about the damage in newly laid roads, has gone viral and her thought mirrored the voice of millions of people across India.

In 2012, she was appointed as the district magistrate of Hamirpur and transferred to Mathura on 8 June 2014. Therefore, she became the second female district magistrate of Mathura. In 2015, she was appointed as district magistrate of Bulandshahr, and transferred to Bijnor as a district magistrate. While serving as the district magistrate of Bijnor, she was criticized for the reopening of a slaughter house in Sahaspur, Bijnor. On 15 September 2016, she was appointed as the district magistrate of Meerut.

After this incident, she also worked as district magistrate for the public welfare and being picked up by the NDA government as director of Swachch Bharat Mission under the Ministry of Drinking Water and Sanitation in 2017. She has instructed her officers to settle all the grievances immediately. Under Swachh Bharat Mission, she has constructed nearly 20 thousand toilets in 242 villages. Considering her good work, she was transferred under the Swatch Bharat Mission to the Ministry of Drinking Water and Sanitation on the post of deputy secretary.

In January 2019, she came under the CBI scanner for allegedly bypassing rules while granting sand mining licences during her tenure as District Magistrate of Hamirpur during the Samajwadi Party government in 2012.

== Legal cases and investigations ==
On 9 September 2016, Allahabad High Court ordered a CBI enquiry against the illegal mining across Uttar Pradesh, then Uttar Pradesh Chief Minister Akhilesh Yadav removed mines minister Gayatri Prasad Prajapati for his alleged collaboration with the mining mafia. Before that from 2012 to June 2013, Yadav himself was the incharge of mining UP state mining ministry before Prajapati was made the mining minister. House and offices of Samajwadi Party MLC Ramesh Mishra, BSP politician Satyadev Dikshit and 2008 batch IAS officer B Chandrakala were raided, incriminating evidence including documents, INR 2 crore cash and jewellery were seized from 14 locations in 7 cities. B Chandrakala is accused of bypassing the rules to illegally allocate the mines. Prajapati was earlier arrested in 2017 in an unrelated rape case.
