= Begums, Thugs and White Mughals =

- Author: William Dalrymple
- Language: English
- Subject: Narrative history
- Genre: Non-fiction
- Publisher: Eland Books
- Publication date: 2002
- Publication place: United Kingdom
- Media type: Print (Hardcover, Paperback)
- ISBN: 0-907871-88-7
- OCLC: 50433421
- Dewey Decimal: 915.404/31 22
- LC Class: DS412 .P24 2002
- Preceded by: White Mughals
- Followed by: The Last Mughal

Begums, Thugs and White Mughals: The Journals of Fanny Parkes is a 2002 historical travel book based on the journals of Fanny Parkes and edited by William Dalrymple.

Dalrymple's work on this book followed his earlier book, White Mughals.

== Summary ==
This is an edited edition of the travel journals of the traveller Fanny Parkes, who was in India from 1822 to 1846. Dalrymple previously edited another book by Parkes, Wanderings of a Pilgrim in Search of the Picturesque.

He wrote the introduction in which he challenged some of the preconceptions of academic studies of travel writing. He attempted to fit all English views on India into the 'Orientalist' template laid down by Edward Said.

"Fanny was a passionate lover of India and, though a woman of her time, in her writing and her travels did her best to understand and build bridges across the colonial divide," he writes "[A]s Colin Thubron has pointed out, ‘To define the genre [of travel writing] as an act of domination – rather than of understanding, respect or even catharsis – is simplistic.

If even the attempt to understand is seen as aggression or appropriation, then all human contact declines into paranoia.’ The attacks made on Fanny highlight the problem with so much that has been written about 18th- and early 19th-century India: the temptation felt by so many critics to project back onto it the stereotypes of Victorian and Edwardian behaviour and attitudes with which we are so familiar."
