= Fanny Parkes =

Welsh writer on India

- Born: Frances Susanna Archer; 8 December 1794; Conwy, Wales
- Died: 1875 (aged 80–81); City of Westminster, London
- Occupations: Author and travel writer
- Spouse: Charles Crawford Parks (m. 1822; died 1856)

Fanny Parkes or Parks (née Frances Susanna Archer) (1794–1875) was a travel writer from Wales, known for her extensive journals about colonial India, where she lived for 24 years. These are recorded in her memoirs Wanderings of a Pilgrim in Search of the Picturesque. in which she acknowledged authorship only by a signature in Urdu script. In 1970, extracts from her memoirs, renamed as, Begums, Thugs and White Mughals, became available for the first time since their original appearance in 1850. The first biography, by Barbara Eaton, Fanny Parks: Intrepid Memsahib, appeared in 2018.

== Early life and family ==
Fanny Parkes was born Frances Susanna Archer in Conwy, Wales, the daughter of Ann and Captain William Archer, 16th Lancers. On 25 March 1822 she married Charles Crawford Parks (17 November 1797 – 22 August 1856), a writer for the East India Companies.

She had an older sister named Anne; Anne married a military chaplain who was posted to South India, and lived there for many years.

== Travels through India ==
Volume 1 of Wanderings of a Pilgrim (full scan)

Parkes lived in India between 1822 and 1846, with a break in England and Cape Town 1839–1844.

Parkes began living in Calcutta in 1822, before moving to moving to Cawnpore in 1830; in September 1832, her husband was given a permanent posting in Allahabad and the couple moved there.

She took up horseback riding and enjoyed travelling alone throughout the country, which shocked some of the English neighbours living in the area; she travelled to Simla, Fatighar, Meerut and Benares and served as interpreter to other English parties.

After her father’s death, she returned to England in 1839; she stayed with her mother for two years and then travelled through Europe, returning to Allahabad at the end of 1844. She and her husband returned to England a year later and lived in London for the rest of their lives.

== Travel writing ==
Parkes wrote two volumes on her travels through India on horseback and befriending people around her.

Her detailed memoirs, written in a lively style, reveal independence of mind. Parkes allows an affectionate pre-colonial perspective of northern India and its peoples and customs, recording changes in Britain's governing of India, the economic impact of such policies, and domestic problems in Indian society. People she encountered included wealthy socialites and famine-stricken residents of Kanauj, seen on a trip over mountains from Landour to Simla. Parks' narrative reflects admiration and respect for the richness of Indian culture. It includes a glossary of terms and a collection of translated Indian proverbs.

Some of Parkes's writings cover topics that were controversial at the time. One of the extreme examples was the murder of a woman in sati by those who felt that male heirs were more entitled to her possessions. Parks condemned the event and went on to criticize the laws governing married women in England. Parks also protested about a plan to sell the Taj Mahal, which she compared to Westminster Abbey. Clashing with the lack of respect for Indian culture commonly found in Europe, she described natural beauty in Delhi and Benares, and fascinating dress and cuisine. In one of her last entries, she described feeling disenchanted with Europe after leaving India.

The memoirs were published as Wanderings of a Pilgrim in Search of the Picturesque during four and twenty years in the East with Revelations of Life in the Zenana (Pelham Richardson, 1850). The historian William Dalrymple rediscovered and edited this travelogue as Begums, Thugs & Englishmen, the Journals of Fanny Parkes (Penguin Publishers). Iris Portal referred to Parks as a "kindred spirit" because of her curious writing style and the fact that her book expresses an open-minded approach to Indian customs.

In 1851 she invested money, organised and wrote the catalogue of the "Grand moving diorama of Hindostan, from Fort William, Bengal, to Gangoutri in the Himalaya", which was displayed at the "Asiatic Gallery, Baker Street Bazar, Portman Square. It was so popular that it was also shown in Hull in 1853.

== Bibliography ==
- F. Parks, Wanderings of a pilgrim in search of the picturesque, during four-and-twenty years in the East with revelations of life in the zenana, 2 vols (London: Pelham Richardson, 1850)
- Begums, Thugs & Englishmen, the journals of Fanny Parkes ed. William Dalrymple (London: Sickle Moon Books, 2002) Kindle edition
- Barbara Eaton: Fanny Parks: Intrepid Memsahib, A Biography of Fanny Parks (1794–1875). An Independent Traveller in 19th Century India (UK: KDP Paperback and Kindle ebook ISBN 9781980329336)
