= Ranjana Kumar =

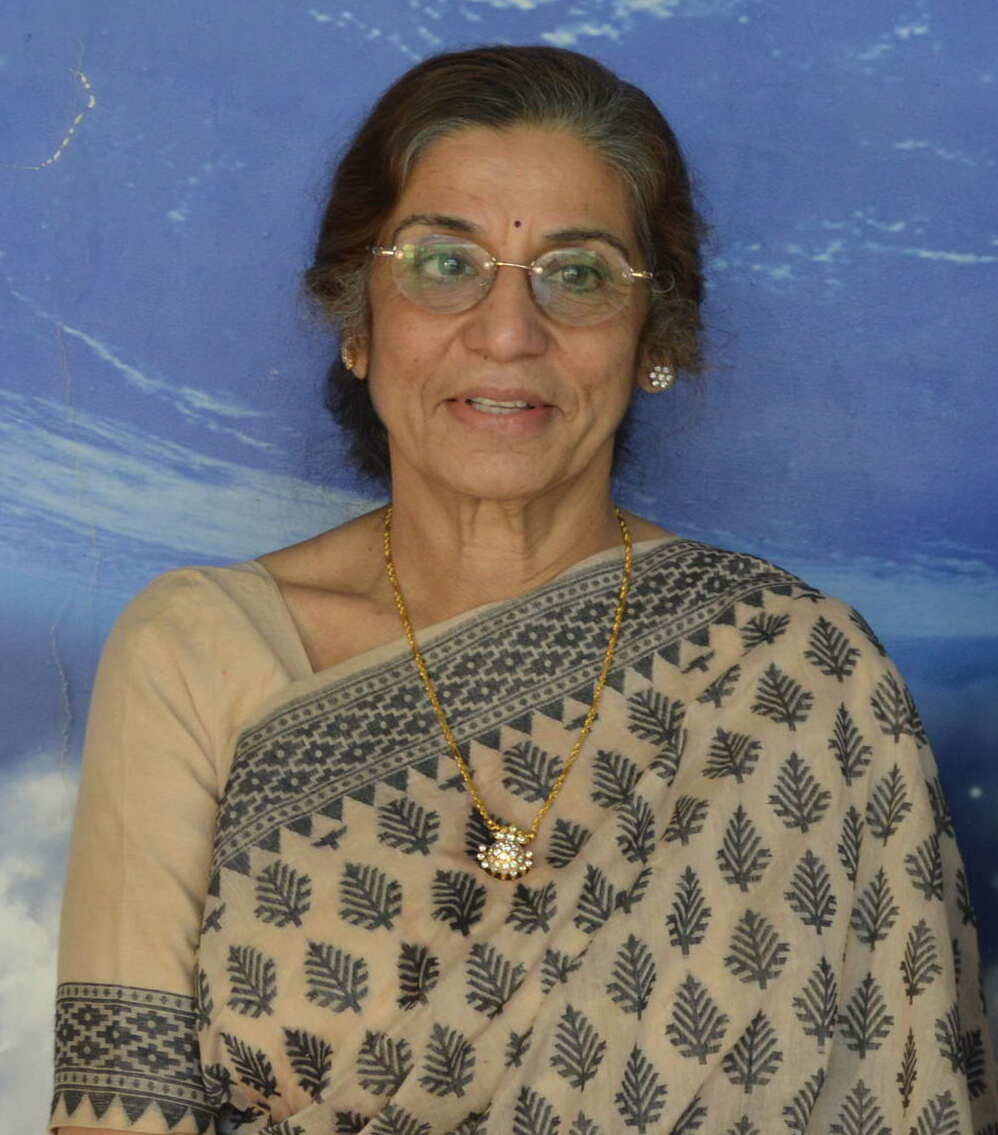
- Ranjana Kumar in 2016

Vigilance Commissioner
- In office 2005–2009

Chairperson of NABARD
- In office 2003–2005

Personal details
- Born: 10 December 1945 (age 80)
- Citizenship: Indian
- Education: University College for Women, Koti
- Occupation: Banker

Ranjana Kumar (born 10 December 1945) is an Indian banker who served as Vigilance Commissioner in Central Vigilance Commission and Chairperson of National Bank for Agriculture and Rural Development (NABARD). She had begun her banking career in 1966 as a probationary officer in Bank of India where she served in various positions. When the Government of India appointed her as the Chairperson and managing Director of the Indian Bank, she became the first woman to become head of a public sector bank in India.

== Bibliography ==
- A New Beginning: The Turnaround Story of Indian Bank - 2009.

== Awards ==
- Professional Manager of the Year - 2014
