= Maulvi Allauddin =

Indian preacher (1824–1889)

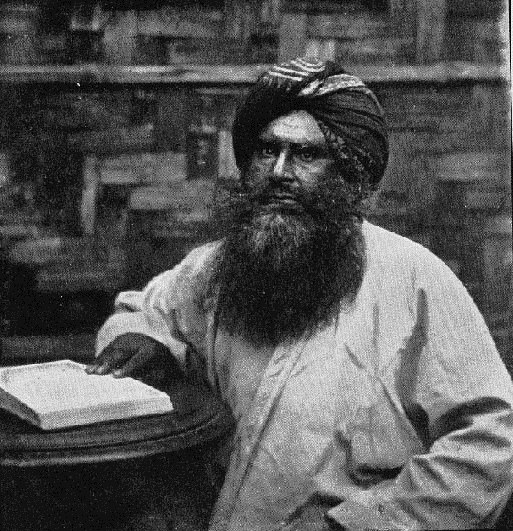
- Undated image of Maulvi Allauddin from the records of the Cellular Jail
- Born: Syed Allauddin Hyder; 1824; Hyderabad State, British India
- Died: 1889 (aged 64–65); Cellular Jail, British India
- Known for: Leading the Indian Rebellion of 1857 in Hyderabad
- Father: Hafizullah

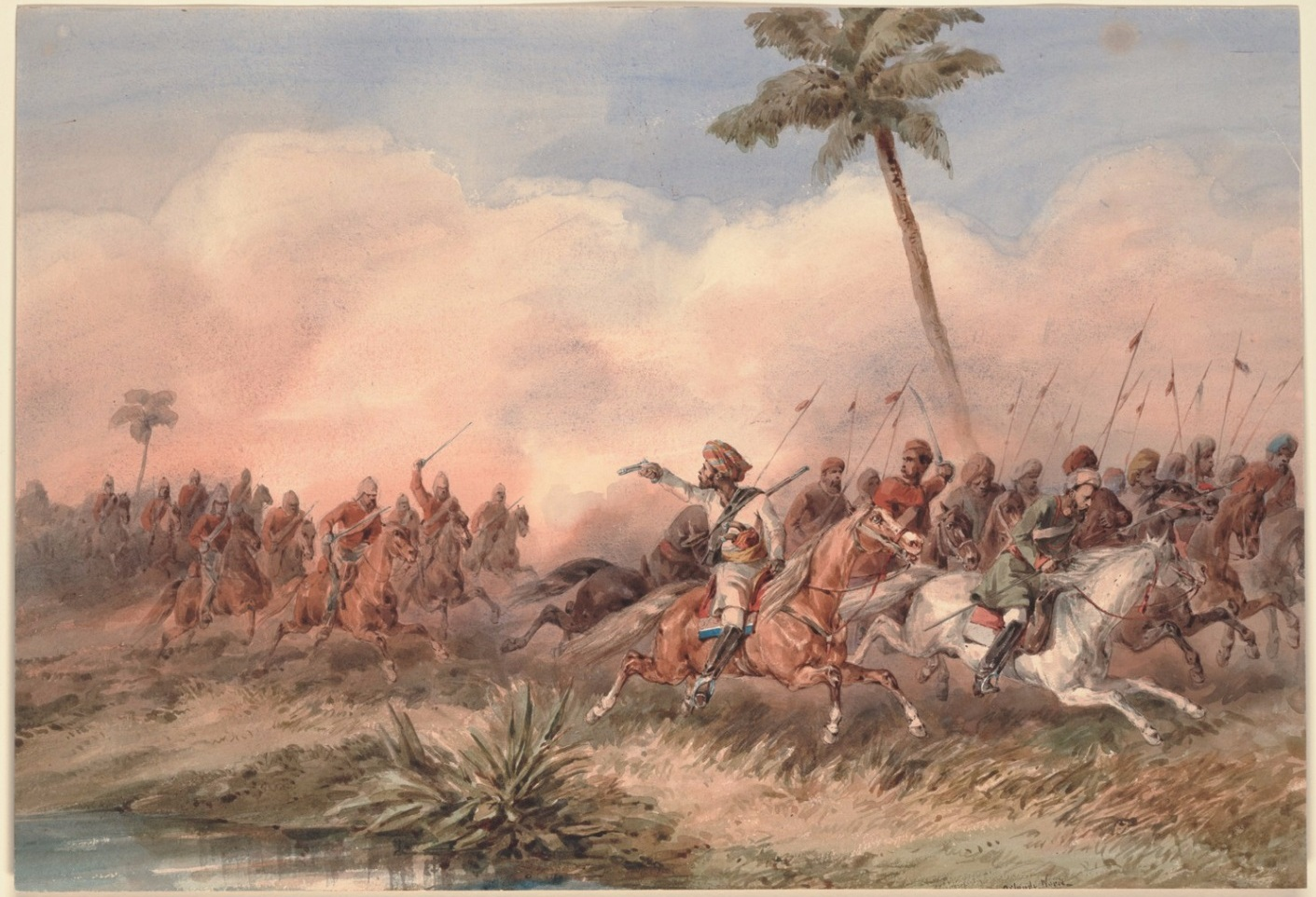
The 2nd Dragoon Guards, the Queen's Bays, routing the Lucknow mutineers near the Hyderabad road

Syed Allauddin Hyder (1824 – 1889) also known as Maulvi Allauddin was a preacher and Imam of Makkah Masjid, Hyderabad, India. He is popularly known for leading an attack at British Residency on 17 July 1857 located in the princely state of Hyderabad. The attack took place during the Indian Rebellion of 1857. He is considered as the first prisoner to be sentenced and deported to Cellular Jail (also known as Kaala pani) in the Andaman and Nicobar islands.

== Attack on the residency ==
On 17 July about 500 people led by Maulvi Allauddin and Turrebaz Khan took out a protest march from Mecca Masjid to the British Residency. The protesters turned violent and attacked the residency. The British forces opened fire. The protesters sustained a counter-attack for a few hours but had to retreat thereafter. Turrebaz Khan was arrested, while Maulvi Alauddin managed to flee.

He was captured and transferred to the Cellular Jail. He was sent out of Hyderabad on 28 June 1859.

== Imprisonment and final years ==
The Maulvi's right hand had been paralysed owing to a gunshot wound during the attack on the residency. He had also suffered sword wounds on his shoulder and forehead. The Maulvi made repeated requests to be released on basis of poor health and good conduct, but these were rejected. He died sometime in 1889.
