= Turrebaz Khan =

Rohilla freedom fighter and revolutionary during the Revolt of 1857

- Born: Begum Bazar, Hyderabad State, Company rule in India (now Hyderabad, India)
- Died: 1857; Hyderabad, Hyderabad State, Company rule in India (now Hyderabad, India)
- Cause of death: execution
- Known for: Leading the Indian Rebellion of 1857 in Hyderabad
- Father: Rustam Khan

Turrebaz Khan (Pashto: تورم خان, Urdu: طرم خان) (died c. 1857), also known as Turram Khan, was an Indian Rohilla revolutionary who fought against the British in Hyderabad State during the Indian Rebellion of 1857 and was hung by the British.

== Life ==
Turrebaz Khan was born to a Pathan Muslim family in Begum Bazar in present-day Hyderabad district. He revolted against the British Indian Empire, despite opposition from the ruling Nizam. A street is named after him in Begum Bazar.

On 17 July about 500 rebels led by Maulvi Allauddin and Turrebaz Khan took out a protest march from Mecca Masjid to the British Residency. The protesters turned violent and attacked the residency. The British forces opened fire. The protesters sustained a counter-attack for a few hours but had to retreat thereafter. Khan was arrested, while Maulvi Alauddin managed to flee.

== In popular culture ==
Notable for his valour and courage, his name is often used as a slang for describing someone as heroic.

== Bibliography ==
- Ali, Moulvie Syed Mahdi (1883), Hyderabad Affairs (Volume 3), The Times of India Steam Press, Bombay
