= British Residency, Hyderabad =

Koti Residency
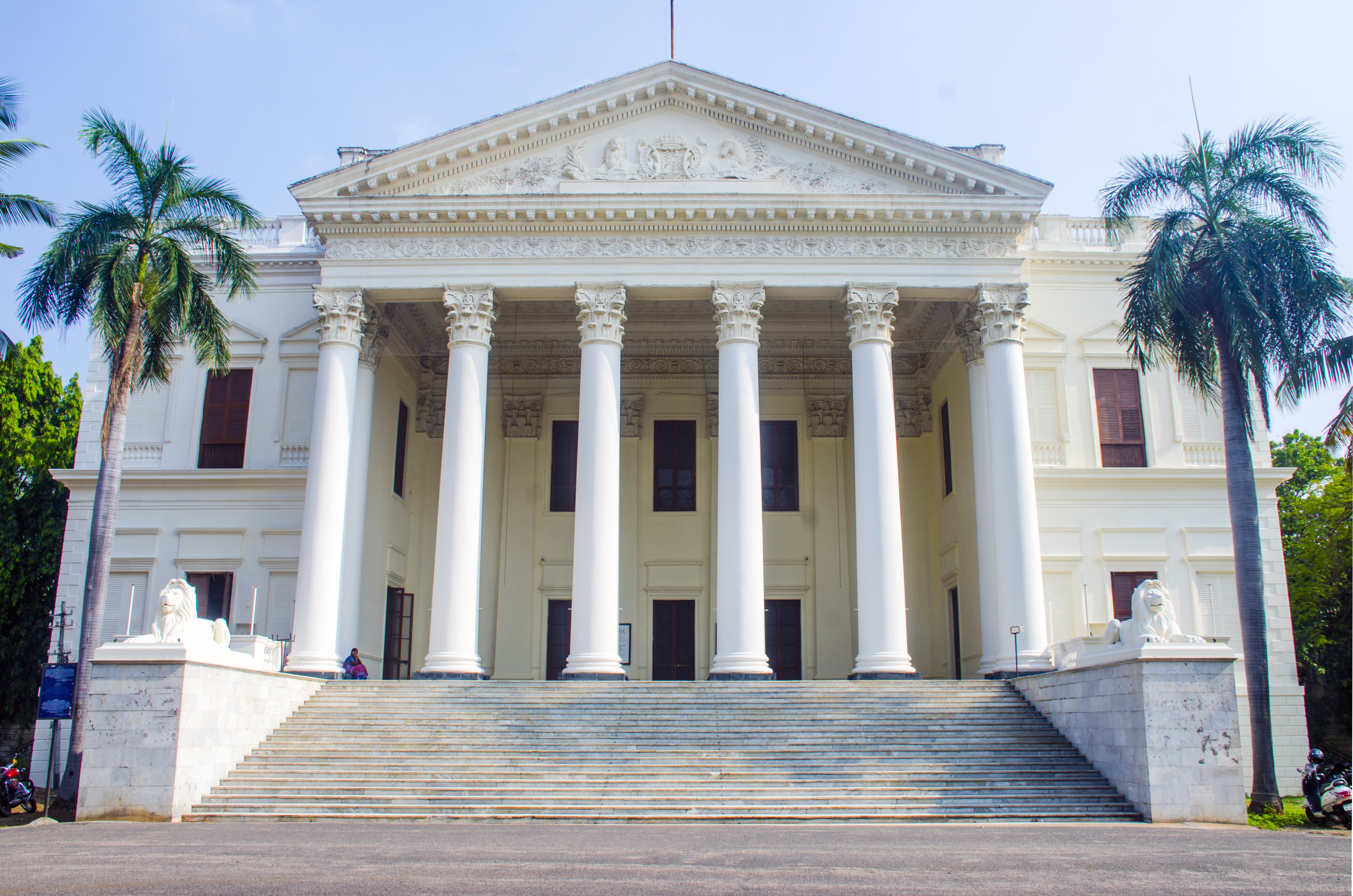
- Front façade of the Koti Residency
- Interactive map of the Koti Residency area

General information
- Type: Ambassadorial residence
- Architectural style: Palladian
- Location: Hyderabad, India
- Coordinates: 17°23′01″N 78°29′05″E
- Current tenants: University College for Women, Koti
- Completed: Circa 1805; 221 years ago

Design and construction
- Architect: Samuel Russell

Koti Residency or British Residency or "Hyderabad Residency" is an opulent mansion built by James Achilles Kirkpatrick in the princely state of Hyderabad. Kirkpatrick was British Resident of Hyderabad between 1798 and 1805. Today it is part of the Osmania University College for Women and has been converted into a museum. It can be visited with prior online booking.

The building with its classical portico is in the style of a Palladian villa and is similar in design to its near-contemporary in the United States, the White House. The house was designed by Lieutenant Samuel Russell of the Madras Engineers and construction began in 1803.

The building has been included in the list of heritage structures compiled by INTACH. World Monuments Fund has included the building in 2025 World Monuments Watch.

== History ==
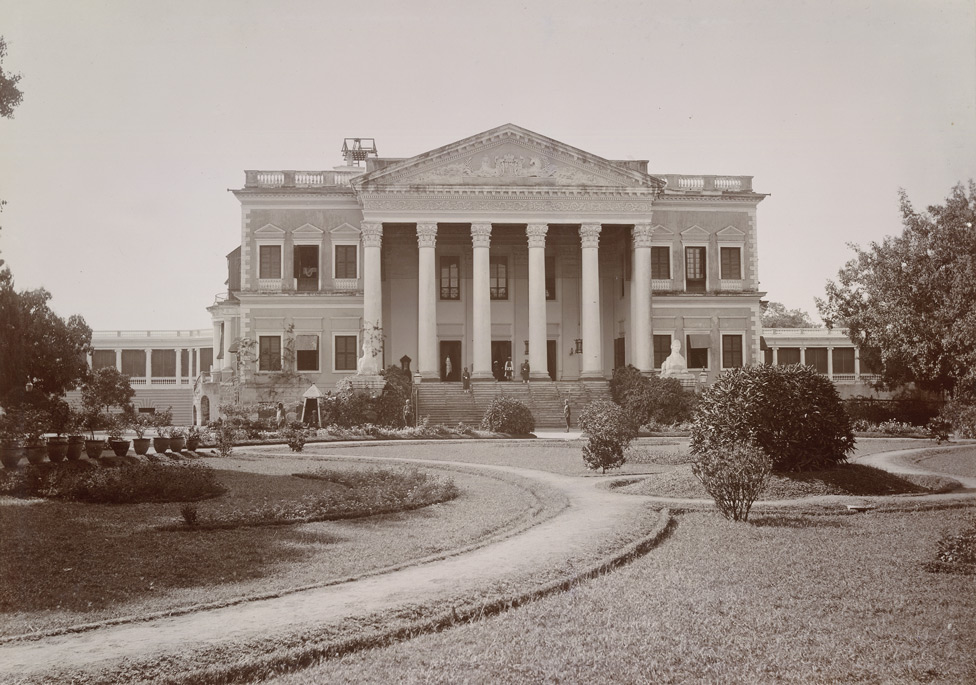
The British Residency photographed by Lala Deen Dayal in the 1880s.

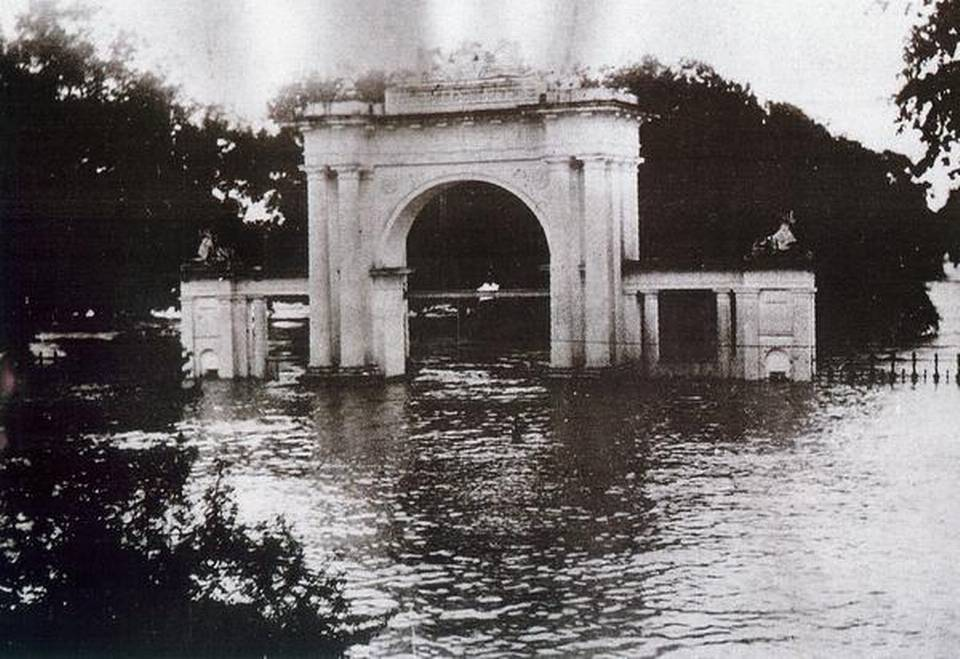
The arched gateway of the then British Residency, partially in water during the Great Musi Flood of 1908.

Kirkpatrick built the mansion for himself and his Indian wife Khair un Nissa, who bore him two surviving children who were sent to England by the age of five and never saw them again due to the early deaths of their parents.

The building was once the embassy of the East India Company to the court of the Nizam of Hyderabad, and the residence of James Kirkpatrick, the British Resident, as well as his successors. Within its compound there were several quarters, including a zenana (women's quarters) where Khair un Nissa lived. Within the compound is a miniature model of the building- legend has it that this was so Kirkpatrick's wife, who remained in purdah, could see the entire mansion, including the front. This scaled model has recently been beautifully restored.

During the Indian Rebellion of 1857, a group of rebels, led by Maulvi Allauddin and Turrebaz Khan, attacked the residency. After the events of 1857, the British erected martello towers at the residency, which were demolished in 1954.

After independence in 1947, the building became vacant. In 1949 it was converted into a women's college, Osmania University College for Women.

After a court directive to the Archaeological Survey of India, it is now a protected monument. However, the building suffered much damage over the years and part of the ceiling had collapsed. It was placed on the 2002 World Monuments Watch list. Restoration works were completed in January 2023, the result of an effort spanning over 20 years.

=== List of British Residents ===
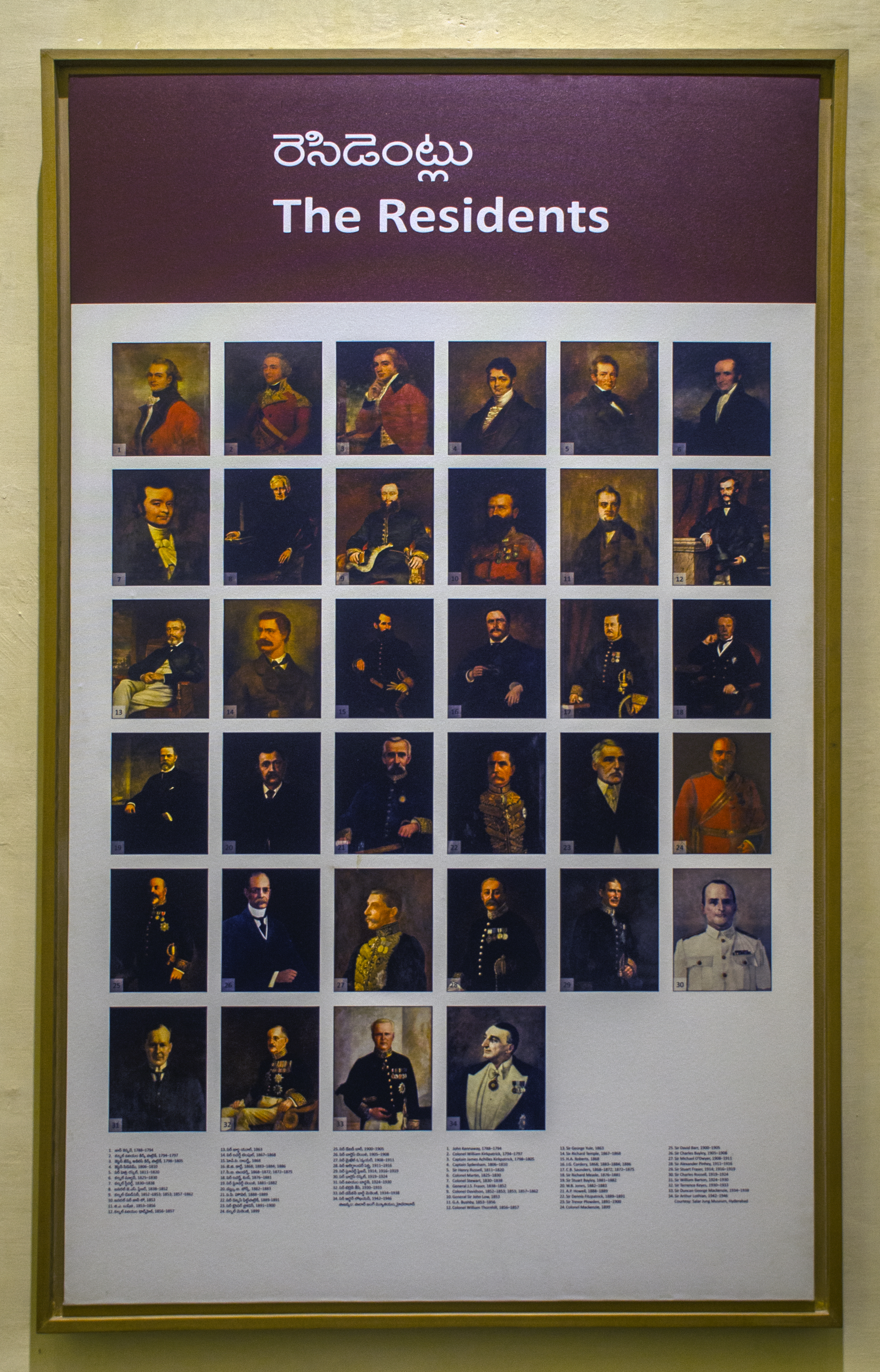
Photos and names of British Residents of Hyderabad

From 1786 - 1947 Hyderabad had 34 British residents.

1. John Kennaway (1788 - 1794)
2. Major-General William Kirkpatrick (1794–1797)
3. Major James Achilles Kirkpatrick (1797–1805) (The residency building was built during his time)
4. Captain Thomas Sydenham (1806–1810)
5. Sir Henry Russell (1811–1820)
6. Colonel Martin (1825 - 1830)
7. Colonel Stewart (1830 - 1838)
8. General J S Fraser (1838 - 1852)
9. Colonel Cuthbert Davidson (1852 - 1853, 1853, 1825 - 1835)
10. General Sir John Low (1853)
11. G A Bushby (1853 - 1856)
12. Colonel William Thornhill (1856 - 1857)
13. Sir George Yule (1863)
14. Sir Richard Temple (1867–1868)
15. H A Roberts (1868)
16. J G Cordery (1868, 1883 - 1884, 1886)
17. C. B. Saunders (1868–1872, 1872 - 1875)
18. Sir Richard Meade (1876–1881)
19. Sir Stuart Bayley (1881 - 1882)
20. W B Jones (1882 - 1883)
21. A P Howell (1888 - 1889)
22. Sir Dennis Fitzpatrick (1889 - 1891)
23. Sir Trevor Chichele Plowden (1891 - 1900)
24. Colonel Mackenzie (1899)
25. Sir David Barr (1900 - 1905)
26. Sir Charles Bayley (1905 - 1908)
27. Michael O'Dwyer (1908–1911)
28. Colonel Alexander Pinhey (1911–1916)
29. Sir Stuart Fraser (1914, 1916–1919)
30. Sir Charles Russell (1919–1924)
31. Sir William Burton (1924 - 1930)
32. Sir Terrance Keyes (1930 - 1933)
33. Sir Duncan George Mackenzie (1934–1938)
34. Sir Claude Henry Gidney (1938–1942)
35. Sir Arthur Lothian (1942–1946)

== Architecture ==
The building is in the Palladian style, with a classical portico. Six Corinthian columns support the roof. Within its compound there were several quarters, including a zenana quarter.
