= Eric Griffiths (critic) =

British academic and literary critic

- Born: 11 July 1953; Liverpool, England
- Died: 26 September 2018 (aged 65)
- Education: Liverpool Institute High School for Boys Cambridge University; Princeton University
- Occupation(s): Academic, literary critic

Eric Griffiths (11 July 1953 – 26 September 2018) was a British academic and literary critic.

== Biography ==
Griffiths was born in Liverpool into what he described as a "Welsh-speaking, chapel-going family", and educated at the Liverpool Institute High School for Boys, Pembroke College, Cambridge, and Princeton University. He was a Fellow of Trinity College, Cambridge from 1980 until his death in September 2018. Before that Griffiths was a Research Fellow of Christ's College, Cambridge.

As well as an academic, Griffiths was also a broadcaster. From 1984, he contributed essays to the BBC Radio 3 series New Premises, introduced by its first producer Thomas (Tom) Sutcliffe, a contemporary at Cambridge. He also appeared in television documentaries, and in 1992 gave the Chatterton Lecture at the British Academy, on Dryden's Past. In 1997 he delivered the F.W. Bateson Memorial Lecture at Oxford University on "The disappointment of Christina G. Rossetti".

Griffiths suffered a stroke in 2011 which seriously impaired his ability to speak. He died on 26 September 2018, aged 65.

== Works ==
Griffiths' PhD thesis, Writing and Speaking, was submitted in 1980 and consists of studies of T. S. Eliot, W. B. Yeats and Ezra Pound. The Printed Voice of Victorian Poetry, published by Clarendon Press in 1989, studies "the ways nineteenth-century English poets responded creatively to the ambiguities involved in writing down their own voices and the melodies of their speech". The book is formed of four chapters: 'The Printed Voice', 'Tennyson's Breath', 'Companionable Forms', and 'Hopkins: The Perfection of Habit'. Griffiths is a sceptic of literary theory, and a follower of William Empson and Christopher Ricks, who taught him as an undergraduate. Griffiths wrote extensively in the Times Literary Supplement, on Delia Smith, William Burroughs and productions of Shakespeare and Beckett, alongside further writings on nineteenth and twentieth century poets. He was known to admire the works of Giacomo Puccini, Marcel Proust and Geoffrey Hill.

== Controversy ==
Griffiths was an academic controversialist. Antagonists included Helen Vendler, after she criticised his long introduction to Dante in English (2005), Roger Scruton, and Terry Eagleton.

In December 1997, Griffiths interviewed college student Tracy Playle for a place studying English at Trinity. Playle afterwards complained that she had been treated unfairly during the interview and had been mocked for her Essex accent and her presumed inability to recognise ancient Greek. The event was reported in the media, causing some controversy regarding the nature of Oxbridge interviews. Subsequently, Griffiths' role as an interviewer was discontinued.

Griffiths had a wide knowledge of popular music, and often used lyrics by Bob Dylan, Talking Heads and other artists in lectures and tutorials. In May 2008, a Tripos question in the Practical Criticism examination exam included song lyrics from "Love Is a Losing Game", by Amy Winehouse. Widespread attention in the national press prompted the identification by some papers of Griffiths as the examiner responsible.
