= William Kirkpatrick (East India Company officer) =

British army officer, diplomat (1754–1812)

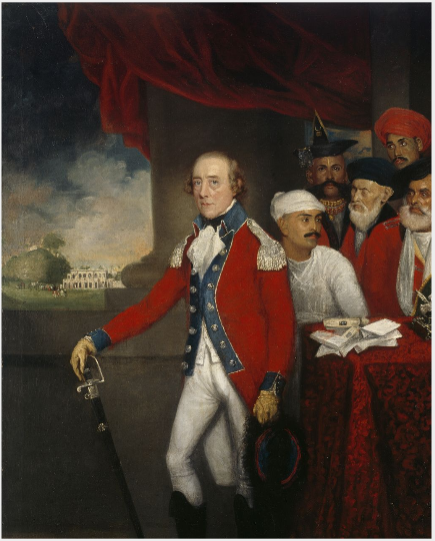
- Portrait by Thomas Hickey, c. 1799
- Born: 1754
- Died: 22 August 1812 (aged 57–58)
- Relatives: James Achilles Kirkpatrick (brother)
- Military career
- Allegiance: East India Company
- Branch: Bengal Army
- Service years: 1771–1812
- Rank: Major-general

Major-General William Kirkpatrick (1754 – 22 August 1812) was a Bengal Army officer, diplomat and orientalist.

== Life ==
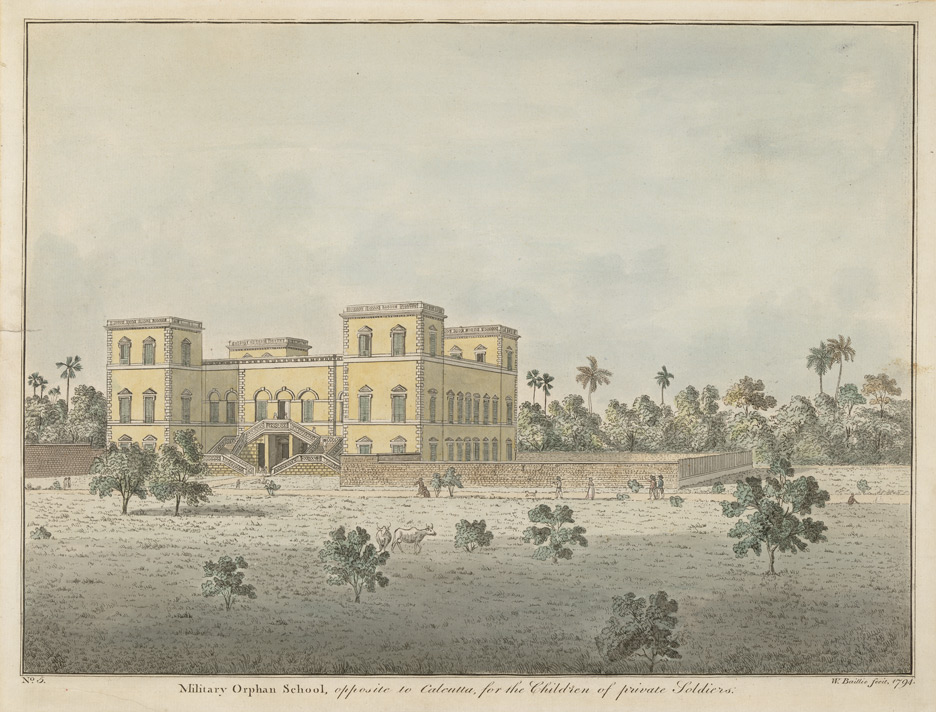
Calcutta military orphan school, converted in 1782 from a rum distillery by William Fitzpatrick of the Bengal fund

He was the eldest son of James Kirkpatrick, a colonel in the Madras Army, and grandson of the author James Kirkpatrick, M.D.. His father was in command of the troops at Fort Marlborough, Sumatra, in 1777, and returned home in 1779. He married Katherine, daughter of Alexander Monro, by whom he had three sons—William, George, in the Bombay civil service, and James Achilles. He died at Hollydale, Kent, in 1818, aged 89.

William Kirkpatrick, the eldest son, became a cadet in 1771, was appointed ensign in the Bengal Army on 17 January 1773, lieutenant 9 April 1777, captain 3 April 1781, and major 1 March 1794. He was Persian interpreter to Giles Stibbert, who was commander-in-chief in Bengal in 1777–9 and 1780–5, and prepared a Persian translation of the articles of war (printed 1782). Afterwards he was resident with Mahadji Scindia at Gwalior, and served on Lord Cornwallis's staff as Persian interpreter in the Third Anglo-Mysore War of 1790–1.

In 1793, after disputes between Nepal and Tibet, a Chinese army crossed Tibet and took up position near Kathmandu. The Nepalese sought the support of the East India Company, Cornwallis offered to mediate, and Kirkpatrick was sent on a mission to meet the Nepal's envoys at Patna. They went on to Nayakote, where the rulers of Nepal held court, and the British officers of the mission were the first to visit what was then an unknown mountain country.

In 1795 Kirkpatrick was appointed resident with the Nizam of Hyderabad, but in 1797 was invalided to the Cape, being replaced by his brother James Achilles Kirkpatrick. In Cape Town Kirkpatrick met Richard Wellesley, 1st Marquess Wellesley, who took him back to India with him as confidential military secretary. He was promoted lieutenant-colonel 12th native infantry 1 January 1798, lieutenant-colonel commandant 8th native infantry 30 June 1804, colonel 6th native infantry 25 April 1808, major-general 4 June 1811. In a despatch dated 10 January 1802, Wellesley declared himself indebted to Kirkpatrick for help against Tipu Sultan.

Kirkpatrick was appointed one of the commissioners for the partition of Mysore after the fall of Seringapatam, for which he received a sum of ten thousand pagodas. In 1801 he was made resident at Pune, but left India later that year, in poor health.

Kirkpatrick died on 22 August 1812, aged 58. He was survived by his ex-wife Maria, and his Indian lover Dhoolaury Bibi, both of whom received a substantial legacy in his will. Kirkpatrick suggested and promoted the Bengal Military Fund, and helped to select the India Library that went to the India Office. His knowledge of the subcontinent was praised by Richard Wellesley, but his brother Arthur Wellesley was less impressed with the Kirkpatrick family.

== Works ==
Kirkpatrick wrote Grammar of the Hindoo Dialect and an Arabic and Persian Vocabulary (1782), published with East India Company support. He translated works from the Persian, and also published a translation of the Diary and Letters of Tippoo Sultaun (London, 1804), and an Account of the Mission to Nepaul in 1793 (London, 1811).

== Family ==
Kirkpatrick married Maria Pawson, a member of the Yorkshire gentry, in September 1785 after a short courtship. She subsequently accompanied him back to India. Their relationship resulted in four children, but quickly became strained and fell apart. Maria returned to England with her children in 1788. From then on, Kirkpatrick attempted to keep in contact with her, but they grew increasingly distant and legally separated in 1797. The children were consequently put into the care of William's family, whereas Maria went back to India with her new lover. In contrast, Kirkpatrick had a much longer-lasting relationship with Dhoolaury Bibi, an Indian woman. They were together from before 1777 until his marriage with Maria in 1785, and resumed their affair when his wife left India in 1788.

Kirkpatrick had four daughters with Maria:

1. Clementina, who married Admiral Sir John Louis, 2nd Baronet;
2. Barbara, who married Charles Buller, M.P.;
3. Julia, who married Edward Strachey (1774–1832), son of Sir Henry Strachey, 1st Baronet, and was mother of Sir Edward Strachey, 3rd Baronet; and
4. Eliza, who died unmarried.

In addition, he fathered two children with Dhoolaury Bibi who he legally acknowledged. Both were educated in England:

1. Robert (*1777)
2. Cecilia
