= Blue Dot Network =

Development strategy and framework proposed by the United States

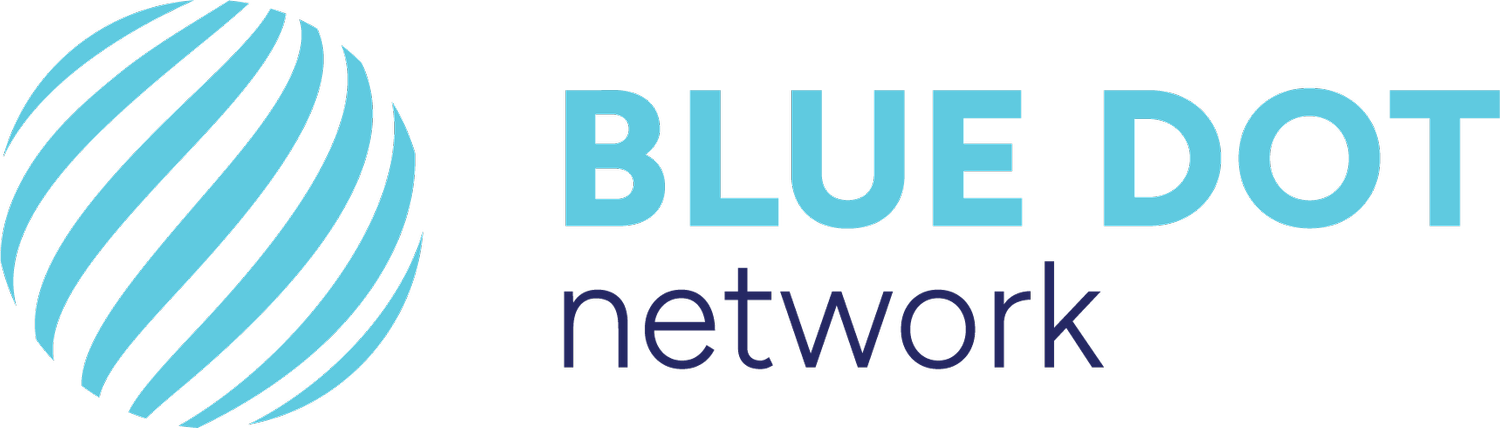

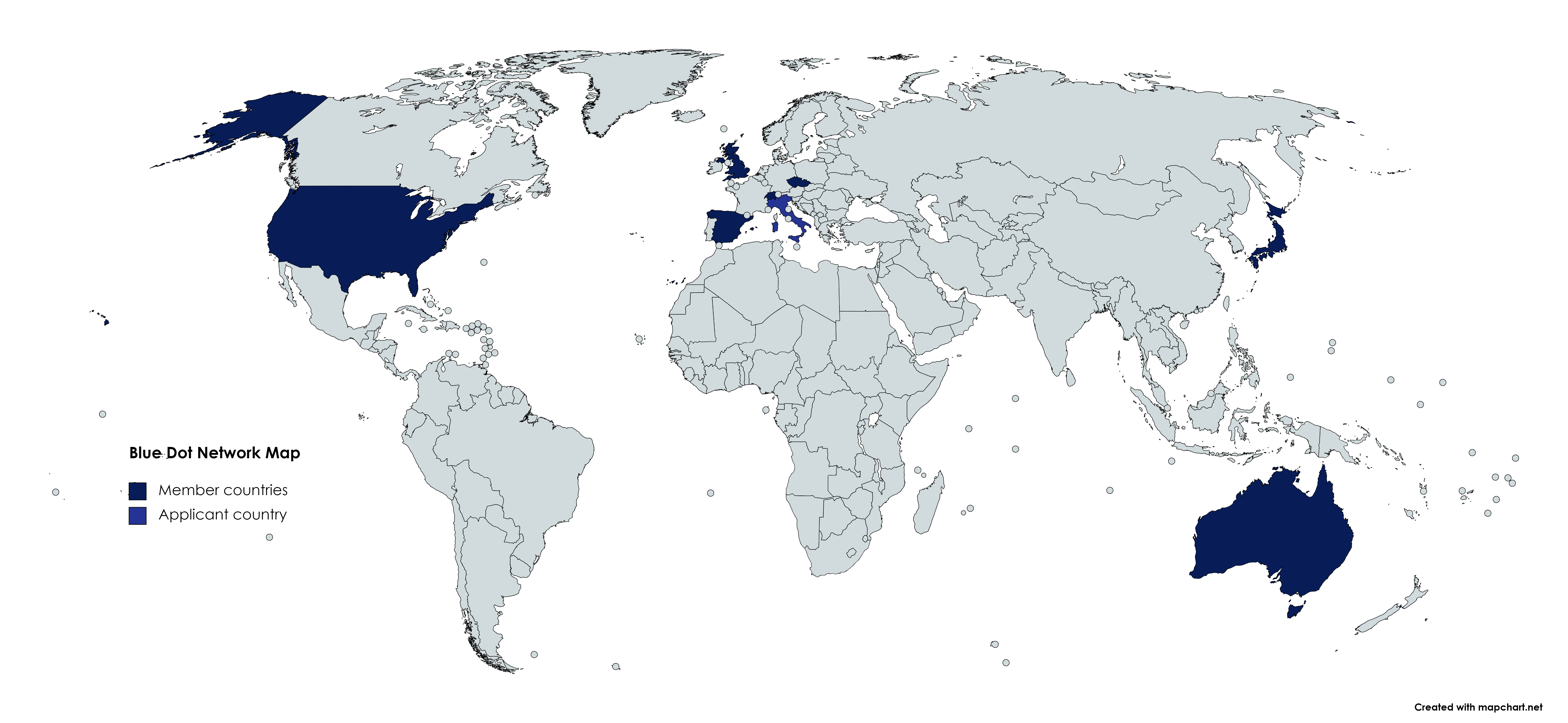
- Blue Dot Network Map
- Formation: November 4, 2019; 6 years ago
- Founders: Australia; Japan; United States
- Purpose: Provide assessment and certification of infrastructure projects
- Headquarters: Paris
- Location: Worldwide
- Region served: Global
- Members: Australia; Czech Republic; Japan; Spain; Switzerland; United Kingdom; United States
- Website: www.bluedot-network.org

The Blue Dot Network (BDN) is a multilateral organisation that promotes a certification framework for quality infrastructure projects. The initiative is a joint project of the governments of Australia, the Czech Republic, Japan, Spain, Switzerland, United Kingdom, and the United States that supports investment in high-quality infrastructure projects around the world, especially by the private sector.

It was founded in 2019 with $60 billion in initial funding. In 2021, the success of the program influenced the adoption of the Build Back Better World (B3W) initiative by the Group of Seven (G7) nations.

The Blue Dot Network certification is developed by the Blue Dot Secretariat with the support of the OECD. The Blue Dot Network Secretariat is an independent entity hosted at the OECD. The Secretariat certifies infrastructure projects globally in partnership with independent certification companies.

The program has been seen as a copy of the China's Belt and Road Initiative international development project.

== Purpose and design ==
The Blue Dot Network is a project-level quality infrastructure certification, which seeks to ensure that the certified projects advance the following goals:

1. Promote sustainable and inclusive economic growth and development.
2. Promote market-driven and private sector led investment, supported by judicious use of public funds.
3. Support sound public financial management, debt transparency, and project-level and country-level debt sustainability.
4. Build projects that are resilient to climate change, disasters, and other risks, and aligned with the pathways towards 2050 net-zero emissions needed to keep global temperature change of 1.5 degrees Celsius within reach.
5. Ensure value-for-money over an asset's full life-cycle cost.
6. Build local capacity, with a focus on local skills transfer and local capital markets.
7. Promote protections against corruption, while encouraging transparent procurement and consultation processes.
8. Uphold international best practices of environmental and social safeguards, including respect for labour and human rights.
9. Promote the non-discriminatory use of infrastructure services.
10. Advance inclusion for women, people with disabilities, and underrepresented and marginalised groups.

Standards are set by the U.S. International Development Finance Corporation, and are meant to assess environmental sustainability, financial transparency, and economic impact. The network relies solely on private sector funding and lacks any lending capacity. The BDN certification draws from existing standards like the G20 Principles for Quality Infrastructure Investment, the G7 Charlevoix Commitment on Innovative Financing for Development, the Equator Principles, and the OECD Guidelines for Multinational Enterprises. Projects are evaluated on a scale and can be awarded up to three blue dots, similar to the Michelin star rating system.

According to the OECD, the Blue Dot Network certification can catalyse greater private sector investment into infrastructure projects, especially in developing economies, by assuring investors that key risks have been assessed and mitigated by the project.

== History ==
=== Founding ===
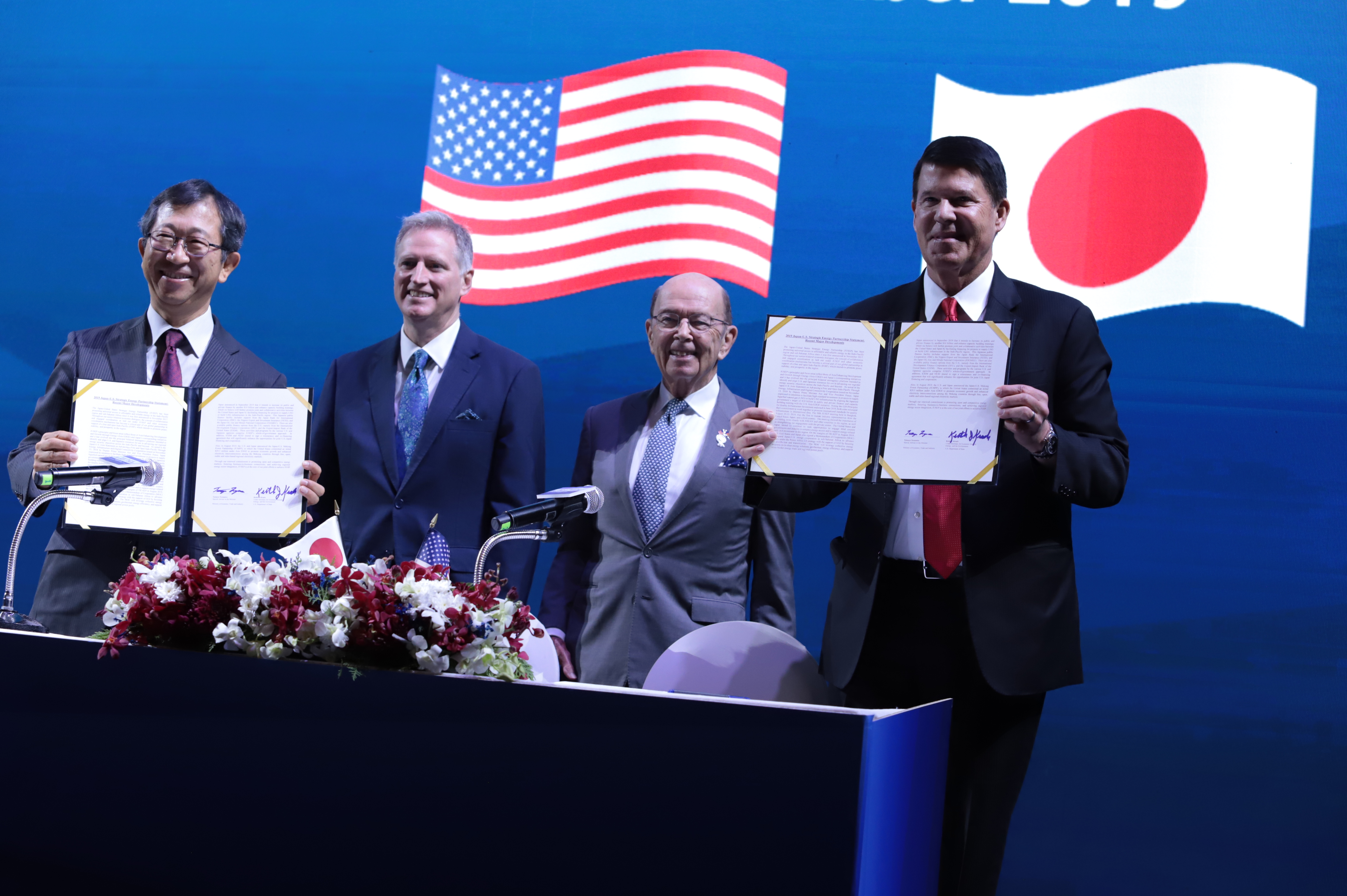
Japan's Ministry of Economy, Trade and Industry Tatsuo Terzawa (left) and US Undersecretary of State Keith Krach (right) sign $10 billion Blue Dot Network energy agreement during the Indo-Pacific Business Forum in Bangkok on Nov. 4, 2019.

The Blue Dot Network principles were outlined by David Bohigian, Acting CEO of the Overseas Private Investment Corporation, in a Washington Times opinion piece on 15 November 2018. On 4 November 2019, Bohigian and U.S. Under Secretary of State for Economic Growth, Energy, and the Environment Keith Krach formally launched the Blue Dot Network with Australian and Japanese counterparts at the Indo-Pacific Business Forum (IPBF) in Bangkok, Thailand on the sidelines of the 35th ASEAN Summit. The announcement was led by the U.S. International Development Finance Corporation, Australia Department of Foreign Affairs and Trade, and Japan Bank for International Cooperation.

Bohigian and Australian and Japanese government officials emphasized that the infrastructure built under the project would be high quality. He also highlighted the differences between BDN and China's Belt and Road Initiative, noting that infrastructure development is beneficial "when it is led by the private sector and supported on terms that are transparent, sustainable, and socially and environmentally responsible". The U.S. Secretary of State Antony Blinken stated in 2021 that the Blue Dot Network was not aimed against the Belt and Road Initiative but that it seeks to promote "a race to the top when it comes to infrastructure, making sure that these investments are made with quality in mind, with communities in mind, with environmental impact in mind, with the rights and responsibilities of all of the stakeholders, including labor, in mind".

The U.S. International Development Finance Corporation managed to raise $60 billion for the project. In January 2020, the U.S. announced the commitment of $2 million in seed money and invited all G-7 member nations to join.

The project is named after the book Pale Blue Dot by Carl Sagan.

=== Development ===
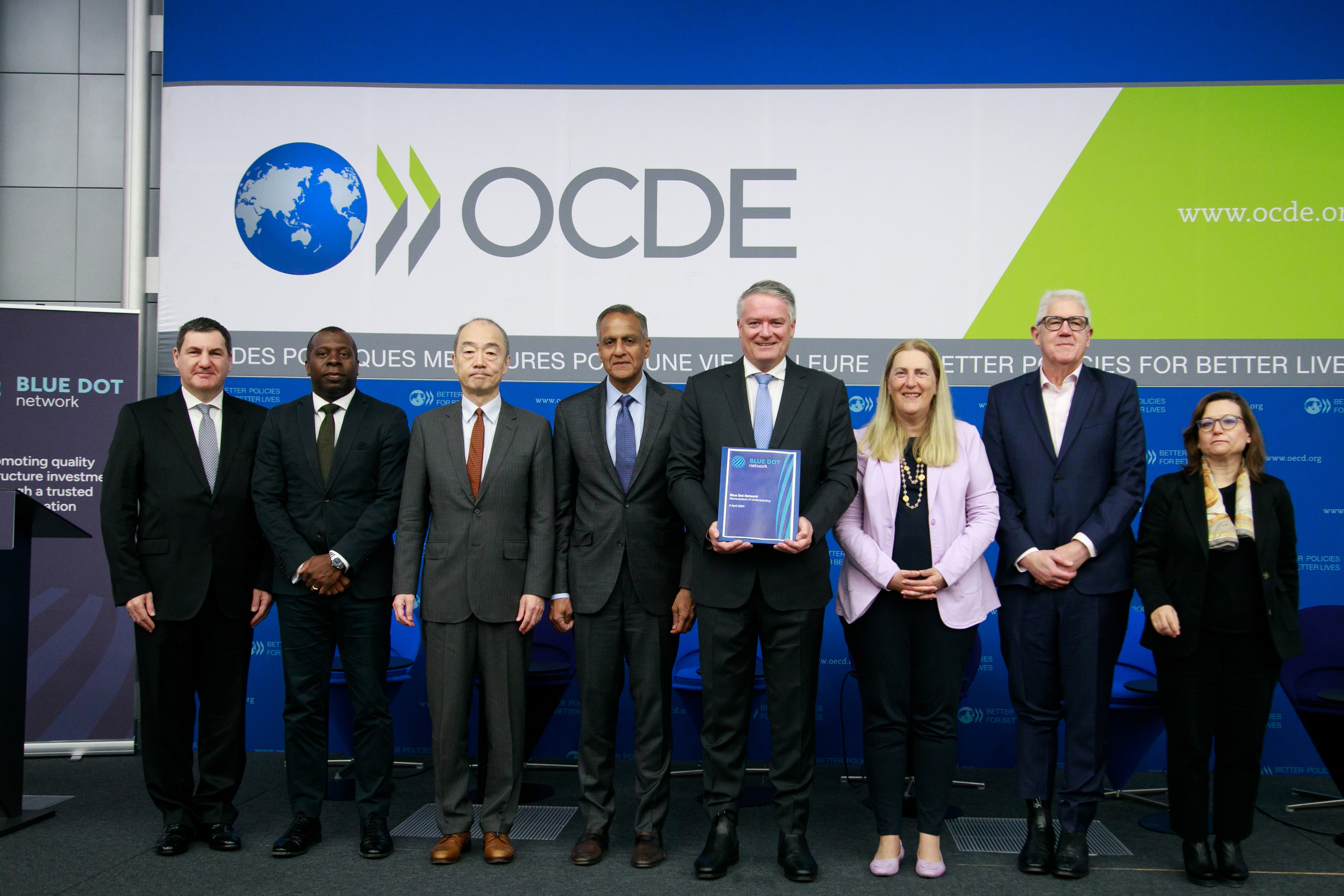
Official launch of the Blue Dot Network Secretariat at the OECD on 8 April 2024, chaired by the OECD Secretary-General Mathias Cormann.

In June 2021, the G-7 announced the adoption of the Build Back Better World (B3W) initiative built off the progress and principles of the Blue Dot Network to counter China's BRI.

In March 2022, the OECD launched a proposal for the Blue Dot Network, which it described as a "voluntary, private-sector focused, government-supported project-level certification scheme developed in alignment" with international standards. The proposed certification framework has been tested with a set of pilot projects, including in energy, transport, water, and ICT sectors. The projects have included projects by notable multinational companies, like Enel and Microsoft.

In December 2023, the OECD Council agreed to establish the Blue Dot Network Secretariat to oversee and govern the certification framework's global launch in 2024.

=== Expanding membership ===
In 2023, several countries joined the original three founding governments as members of the Blue Dot Network:

- In April, the United Kingdom announced that it joined the network's Steering Committee.
- In May, following a meeting between Prime Minister Pedro Sanchez and President Joe Biden at the White House, Spain announced that it has joined the Blue Dot Network.
- In July, following a meeting between Prime Minister Giorgia Meloni and President Biden at the White House, Italy announced its intention to join the Blue Dot Network.
- In November, the Czech Republic and Switzerland joined the Blue Dot Network.

=== Global launch ===
In 2024, the certification framework was made available to quality infrastructure projects globally. The Blue Dot Network Secretariat, a multilateral organisation, was officially launched on 8 April 2024. The Blue Dot Network Secretariat, in partnership with global certification companies - Bureau Veritas, Ricardo and SGS - began the assessment of prospective projects seeking certification. In April 2025, the Blue Dot Network Secretariat hosted a certification ceremony, where the Blue Dot Network certification was awarded to the first group of projects. The first certified projects include the Eurasia tunnel in Istanbul; Aguas do Rio, a major water sanitation works in the Rio de Janeiro region of Brazil; an undersea data cable in Palau; and the El Dorado international airport in Colombia.

== See also ==
- Transport in Australia
- Transport in Japan
- Transport in the United States
- Quadrilateral Security Dialogue
- The Clean Network
- Build Back Better World
- Equator Principles
- Global Gateway
- Partnership for Global Infrastructure and Investment
- India-Middle East-Europe Economic Corridor
