= Partnership for Global Infrastructure and Investment =

International funding project by G7 nations

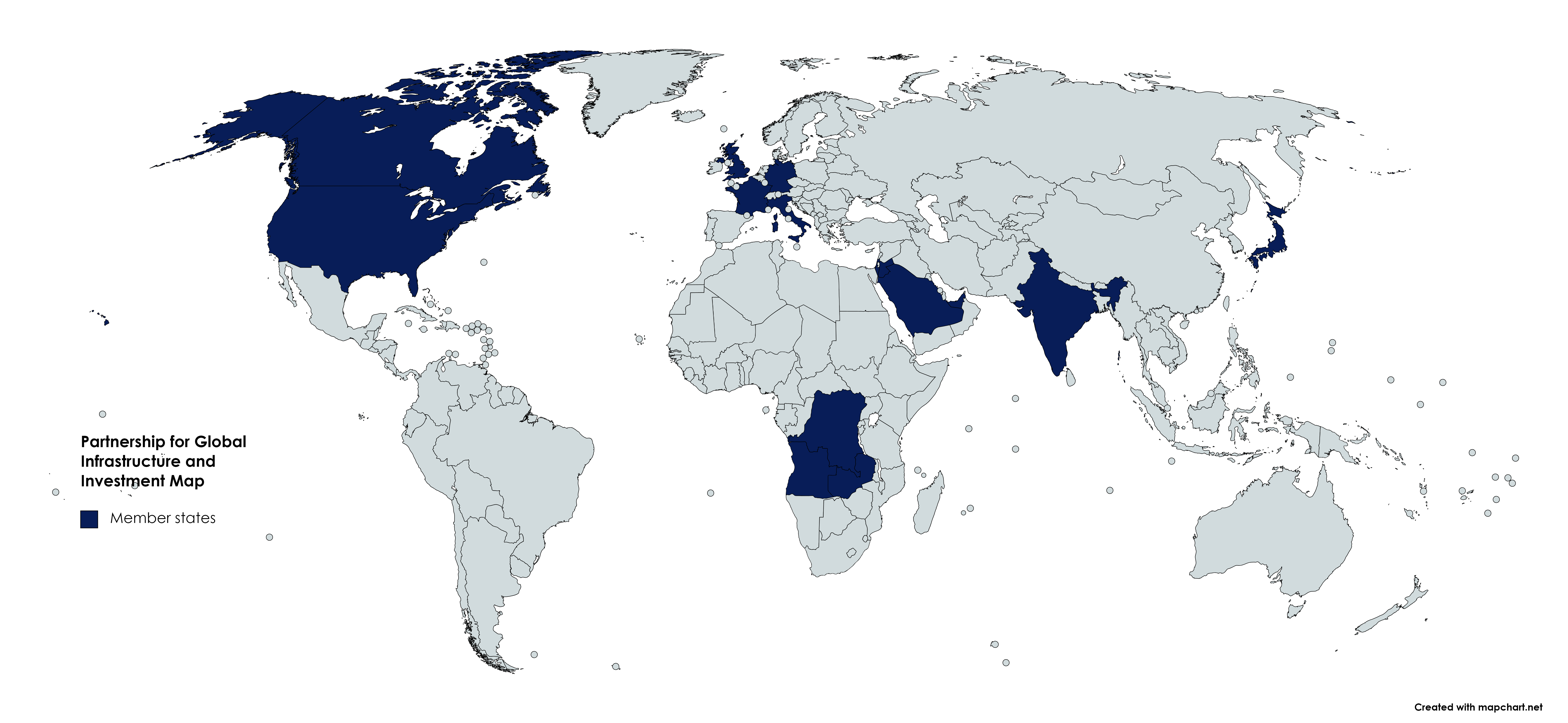
- Map of The Member States of The Partnership for Global Infrastructure and Investment
- Abbreviation: PGII
- Formation: 2022; 4 years ago
- Founder: G7
- Purpose: Fund infrastructure projects in developing nations
- Location: Worldwide

The Partnership for Global Infrastructure and Investment (PGII or PGI) is a collaborative effort by Group of Seven (G7) to fund infrastructure projects in developing nations based on the trust principles of the Blue Dot Network. It is intended to be the bloc's counter to China's Belt and Road Initiative and a key component of the "Biden Doctrine".

PGII is a rebranding of the former Build Back Better World initiative. The re-brand followed difficulties in implementing the Biden administration's similarly named domestic legislative agenda.

As of early 2024, few details of the initiative had been announced.

== History ==
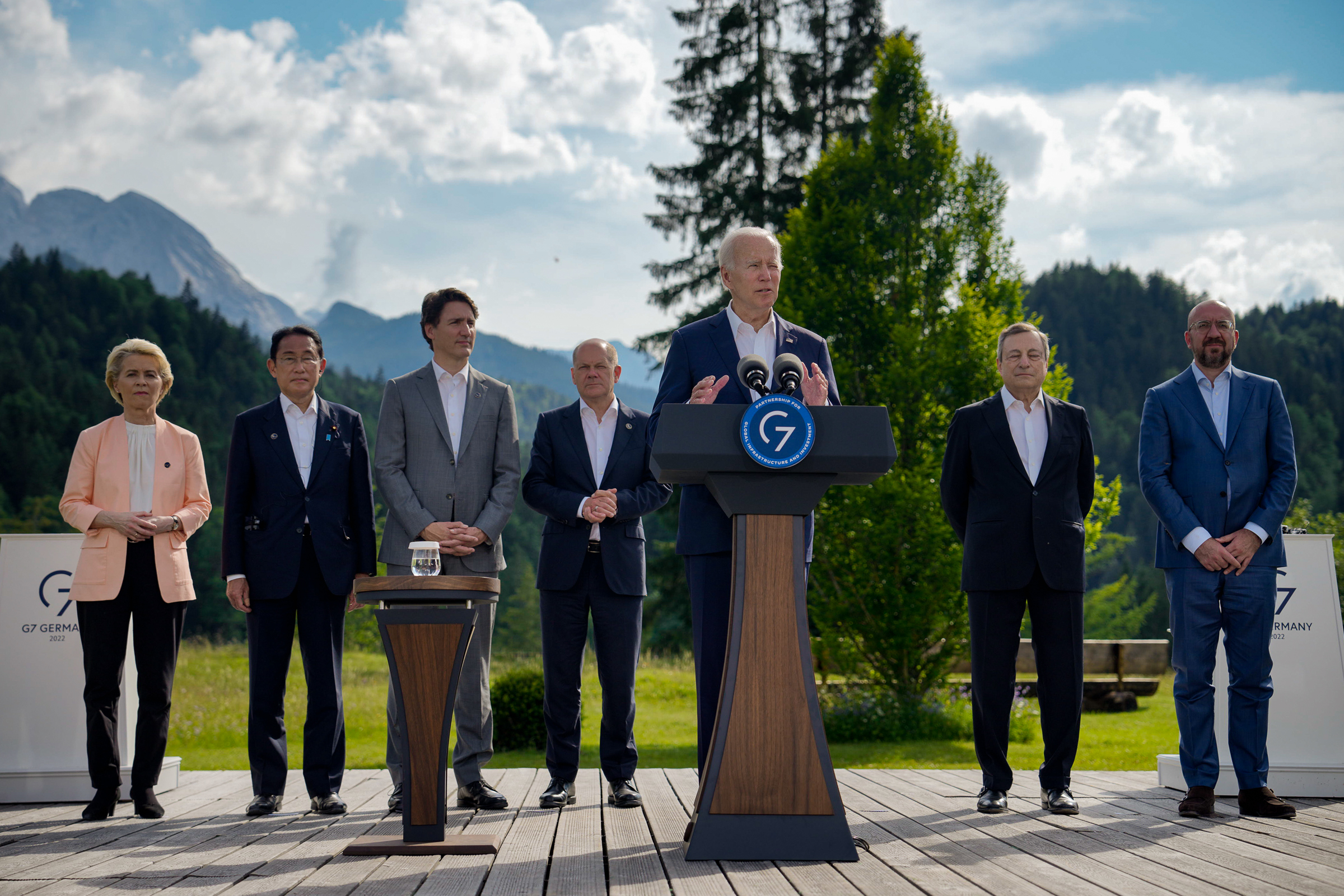
G7 leaders launching the PGII in Schloss Elmau, Germany

The partnership plan was announced for the first time in June 2022 during the 48th G7 summit in Germany. According to an article by Center for Strategic and International Studies, PGII is the repackaged version of the Build Back Better World (B3W) initiative which President Biden announced at the 47th G7 summit in the United Kingdom.

=== Blue Dot Network ===
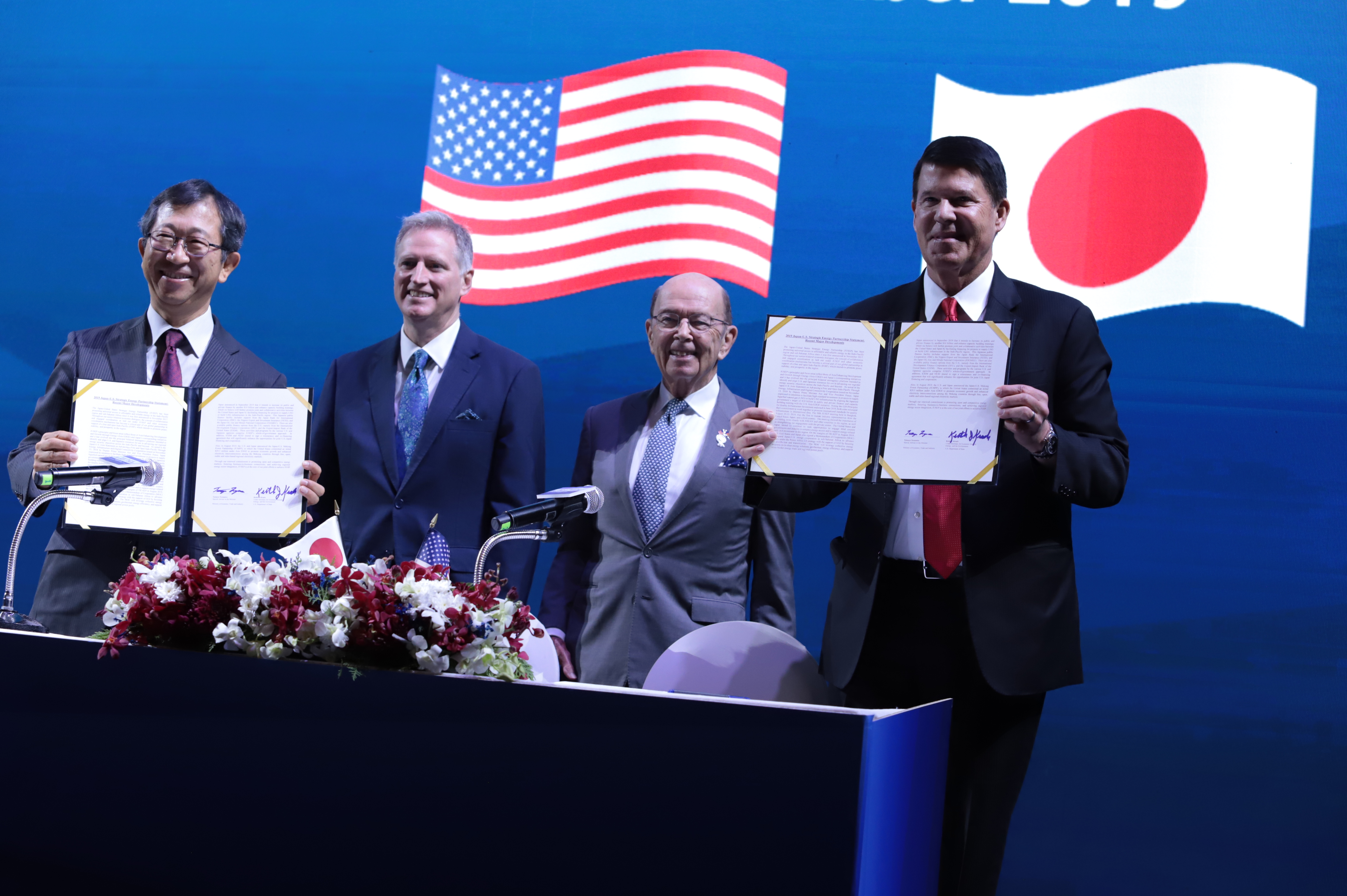
Japan's Ministry of Economy, Trade and Industry Tatsuo Terzawa (left) and US Undersecretary of State Keith Krach (right) sign $10 billion Blue Dot Network energy agreement during the Indo-Pacific Business Forum in Bangkok on 4 November 2019.

The Blue Dot Network (BDN) is a multi-stakeholder initiative formed by the United States, Japan, and Australia to provide assessment and certification of infrastructure development projects worldwide on measures of financial transparency, environmental sustainability, and impact on economic development, with the goal of mobilizing private capital to invest abroad. It was initially led by the U.S. International Development Finance Corporation (DFC), Japan Bank for International Cooperation, and Department of Foreign Affairs and Trade of Australia.

On 4 November 2019, U.S Under Secretary of State Keith Krach formally launched the Blue Dot Network with his Australia and Japan counterparts with access to $60 billion of capital from the DFC at the Indo-Pacific Business Forum. Krach made three major related announcements in energy, infrastructure and digital initiatives which consisted of a new multilateral infrastructure initiative unveiled by the U.S., the signing of a $10 billion agreement strengthening the Japan-U.S. Strategic Energy Partnership; and the plan to spur digitally driven economic growth economic in the Indo-Pacific. In all three economic pillars, Under Secretary Krach engaged in US-ASEAN Business Council and U.S. Chamber of Commerce by implementing advanced U.S. efforts in establishing a set of global trust standards.

On 29 January 2020, Blue Dot Network's steering committee held its first meeting in Washington with the US, Australia and Japan. Under Secretary Krach committed $2 million of U.S. State Department seed money for the steering committee and issued a public invitation to all other G7 members to come on board.

On 25 February 2020, the Blue Dot Network was incorporated into the India-U.S. Comprehensive Global Strategic Partnership Joint Statement.

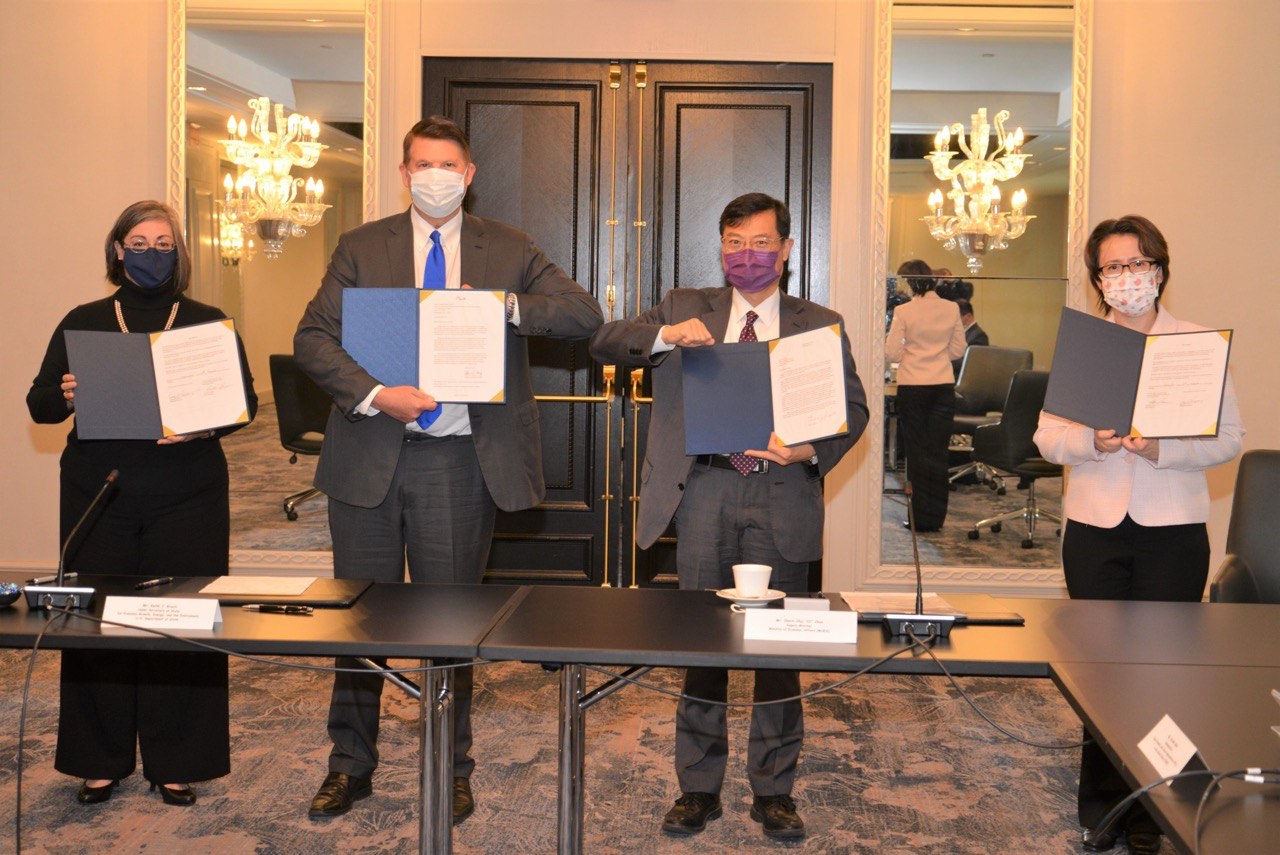
American Institute in Taiwan managing director Larson, Under Secretary of State Keith Krach, Taiwan's Minister of Economic Affairs Chen Chern-chyi, and Taiwan's de facto ambassador Bi-khim Hsiao

On 20 November 2020, Taiwan joined the Blue Dot Network with the signing of the U.S.-Taiwan Economic Prosperity Partnership (EPP) between Taiwan Minister John Deng and Under Secretary of State Keith Krach at the EPP Dialogue's inaugural meeting in Washington.

On 19 October 2020, on behalf of the Twelve Three Seas nations, President Kersti Kaljulaid endorsed the Blue Dot Network and the Clean Network at the Three Seas Summit in Tallinn, Estonia. U.S. Under Secretary of State Krach committed a $1 billion investment with the initial investment of $300 million in trusted clean infrastructure, as described in the Blue Dot standards for roads, bridges, railways, 5G, ports, and energy projects in the Three Seas region between the Baltic, Adriatic, and Black seas. The goal is to stimulate investments by each member country.

On 14 January 2021, Georgia adopted the Blue Dot Network as part of joining the Clean Network Alliance of Democracies at the signing ceremony between Georgian Minister of Economy and Sustainable Development Natia Turnava and US Under Secretary of State Keith Krach.

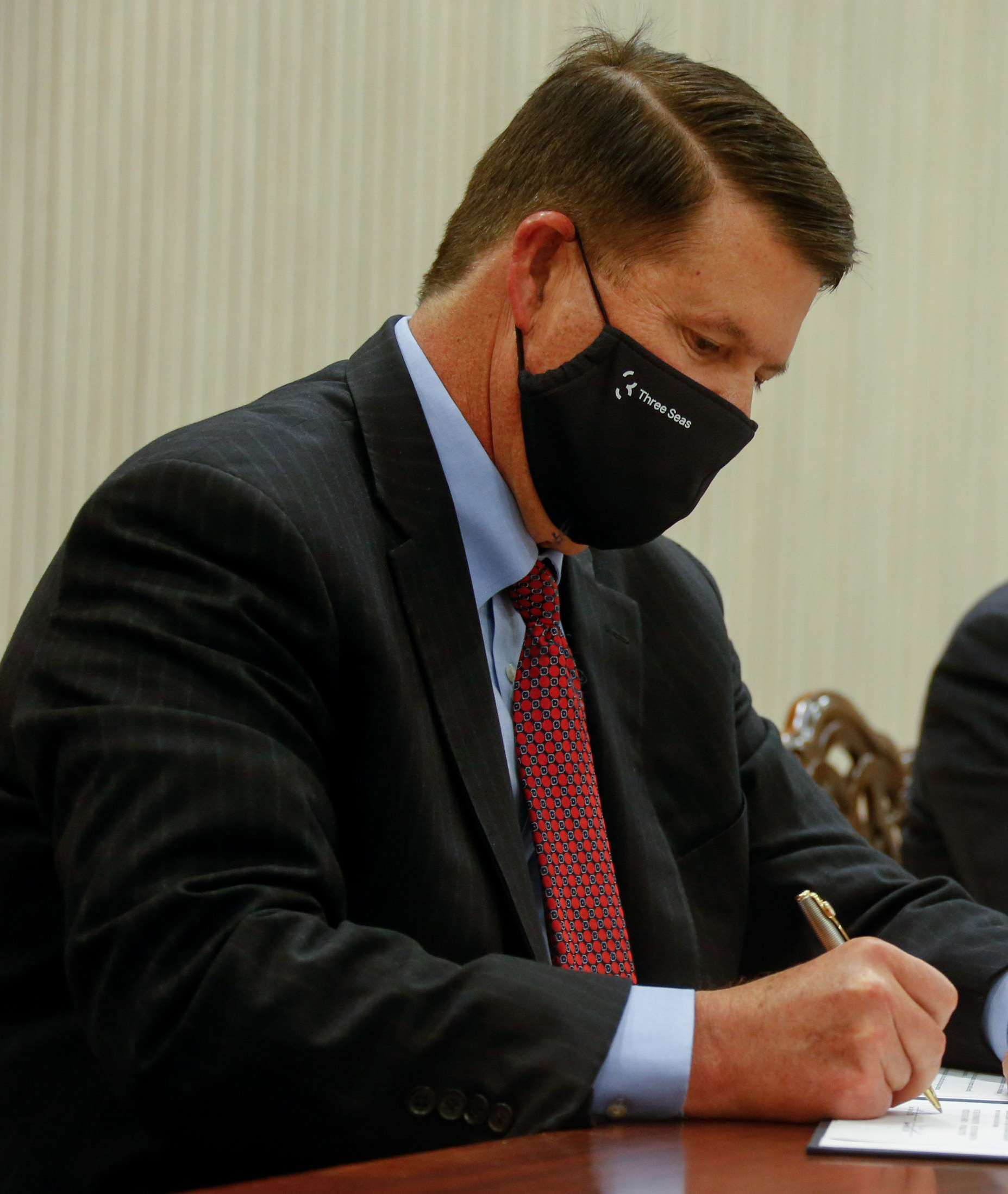
Krach wearing a Three Seas medical mask while signing a memorandum regarding cooperation

On 7 June 2021, the OECD committed to supporting the Blue Dot Network at a meeting of the Executive Consultation Group in Paris, France.

=== Build Back Better World ===
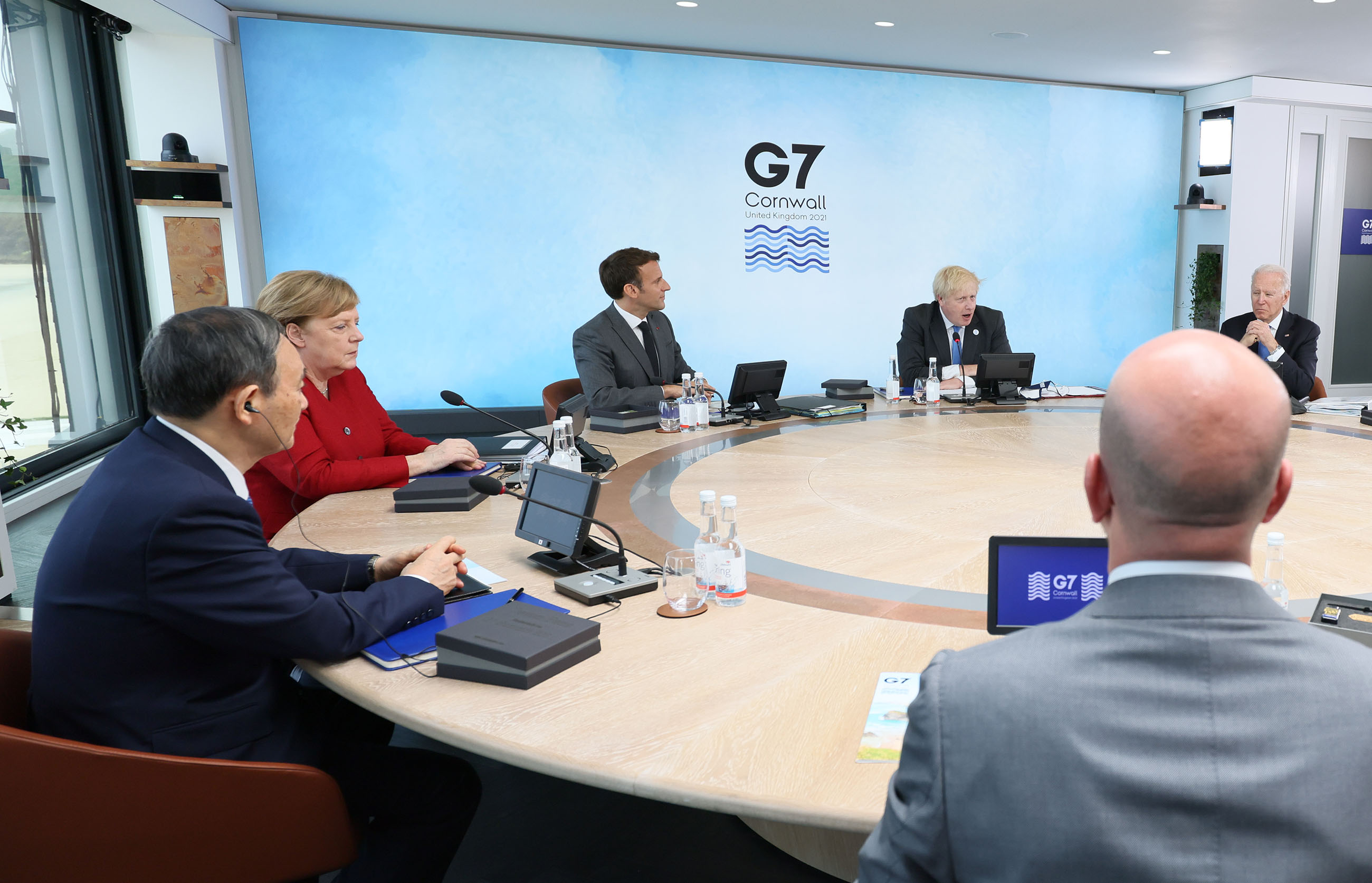
World leaders at the 2021 G7 Summit in England

On 12 June 2021, the Group of Seven (G7) announced the adoption of the Build Back Better World (B3W) initiative built off the progress and principles of the Blue Dot Network to counter China's BRI to address the $40 trillion worth of infrastructure needed by developing countries by 2035. The initiative aims to catalyze funding for quality infrastructure in low- and middle-income countries from the private sector and will encourage private-sector investments that support "climate, health and health security, digital technology, and gender equity and equality." The B3W efforts were in line with the standards and principles of the Blue Dot Network (BDN), relating to the environment and climate, labor and social safeguards, financing, construction, anticorruption, and other areas.

B3W was not ultimately detailed beyond the program's general goals. Following legislative difficulties in implementing the Build Back Better domestic agenda, on 26 June 2022, at the 48th G7 summit, the initiative was re-branded as the Partnership for Global Infrastructure and Investment.

=== G7 2023 Hiroshima Summit ===
On 20 May 2023 on occasion of 49th G7 summit, a side event of Partnership for Global Infrastructure and Investment (PGII) was held. Three documents including "Factsheet on the G7 Partnership for Global Infrastructure and Investment" were issued.

As of at least early 2024, most of the details of the PGII had not yet emerged.

=== G7 2024 Apulia Summit ===
At the end of the 50th G7 summit, the partners reiterated their commitment to the PGII, with a goal of $600 billion in private investment by 2027.

== Standards and principles ==
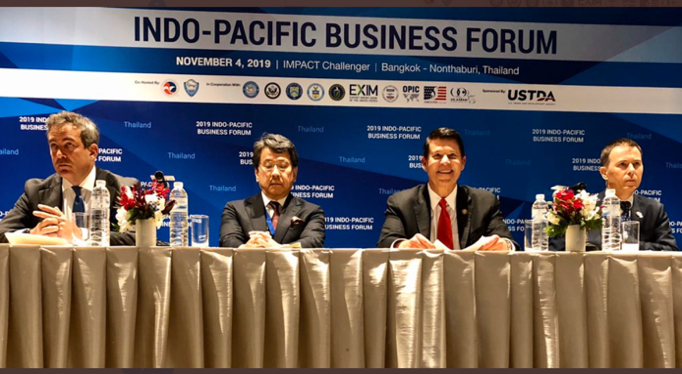
U.S. Under Secretary of State Keith Krach's announcement of Blue Dot Network with OPIC's David Bohigian, Japan's Tadashi Maeda, and Australia's Richard Maude at the Indo-Pacific Business Forum

The PGII efforts are in line with the standards and trust principles of the Blue Dot Network (BDN), which Under Secretary of State Keith Krach formally launched in 2019 at the Indo-Pacific Business Forum in Bangkok. These global trust standards, which are based on "respect for transparency and accountability, sovereignty of property and resources, local labor and human rights, rule of law, the environment, and sound government practices in procurement and financing."

On 7 June 2021, the Organisation for Economic Co-operation and Development (OECD) committed to support the BDN at the meeting of the latter's executive consultation group in Paris, France. On 16 June 2021 Krach was awarded the Westernization Award by StrategEast for his work as Under Secretary of State in the country of Georgia for leading the Clean Network and Clean Infrastructure initiatives, which provide an alternative to the "One Belt One Road" for the countries of Eurasia and is supported by all G7 countries as the Build Back a Better World. In March 2022, Krach was nominated for the 2022 Nobel Peace Prize for developing the 'Trust Principle' doctrine as a peaceful alternative to authoritarian's 'power principle.'

Under Secretary Krach committed $2 million (USD) of U.S. State Department seed money for the steering committee and issued an invitation to other G7 members to join. On 19 October 2020, on behalf of the twelve Three Seas nations, President Kersti Kaljulaid endorsed the BDN and the Three Seas Summit in Tallinn, Estonia.

== Objectives ==
Over the next five years, the G7 governments and its private business sector will invest $600 billion in the PGII. They aim to offer an alternative to China's estimated $1 trillion infrastructure investments worldwide over the past decade.

According to Singapore Forum experts, with the advent of the G7-led PGII, notions such as economic development and foreign direct investment could be "merged" with geopolitical and military objectives:

The US-led G7 and Nato bloc [is] accelerating its ‘pivot to Asia’: the perceived enemy being China, and the weapon of choice infrastructure finance, focusing on energy and transport assets, and massive private equity investments in semiconductors, liquified natural gas terminals and agribusiness, etc.".. [Singapore Forum director] Nicolas Firzli notes that the US administration of president Joe Biden has successfully convinced its partners in Paris, Berlin, Rome and Tokyo to ‘develop a values-driven, high-impact and transparent infrastructure partnership’ to counter China's Belt and Road Initiative. "But this plan comes rather late in the game," he adds. "China has already established solid positions, lower costs and superior technical skills, notably in the fields of civil engineering, construction, high-speed rail and renewable energy.".

— Jeremy Weltman, EBRI Q2 2022 results: G7 Competes with China, Euromoney Country Risk (29 Jul 2022)

== Member states ==
- Angola
- Canada
- Democratic Republic of the Congo
- France
- Germany
- India
- Israel
- Italy
- Japan
- Jordan
- Saudi Arabia
- United Arab Emirates
- United Kingdom
- United States
- Zambia

== See also ==
- Belt and Road Initiative
- Global Gateway
- India-Middle East-Europe Economic Corridor
