= Global Gateway =

EU-funded global development strategy and framework

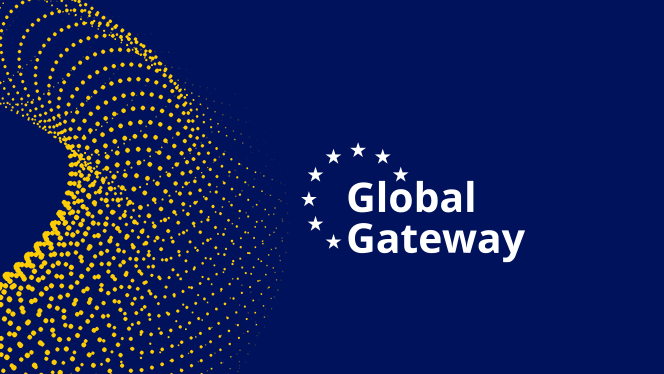
- Logo of the Global Gateway Initiative
- Formation: 1 December 2021; 4 years ago
- Founder: European Union
- Purpose: Promote green, democratic and secure economic development and partnership
- Location: Worldwide
- Main organ: EU Commission
- Budget: EUR€ 300 billion
- Website: https://ec.europa.eu/

The Global Gateway Initiative is a strategy by the European Union to invest in infrastructure projects worldwide. The project was initiated by the EU Commission under the leadership of Ursula von der Leyen. Over the period 2021–2027, the EU will invest €300 billion. Investment into Africa is the regional priority of the initiative, as half the funds are allocated to projects on the continent. They aim to improve the green transition, digital transition, sustainable economic growth, health care and education in Africa.

The initiative is seen as an alternative or rival to the Chinese Belt and Road Initiative. The EU wants to encourage links, and not dependencies, according to von der Leyen. As of December 2022, Global Gateway has been criticised for failing to provide concrete details on projects and drawing heavily on already-existing programmes.

== Objectives ==
As part of its trade relations, the EU sees Global Gateway as an opportunity to trade and invest in global partners better. The initiative is also a response to a longer systemic rivalry between NATO, the European Union, the United States, and other closely related G7 States against the People's Republic of China, made to counter increasing Chinese political and economical influence. At the 47th G7 summit, the leaders agreed on starting investment initiatives to counter the Belt and Road Initiative, with demands for investments in the hundreds of billions. The Statement by the G7 on partnership for infrastructure and investment resembles the approach and goals of the Global Gateway Initiative. Another reason for the proposed investments is the worsening of Climate Change, an issue which the EU sees as vital to tackle. Thus, the Initiative was described as "European Green Deal Worldwide", as a reference to the EU's European Green Deal and intensification of the fight through this mechanism.

== Financing ==
The main funding will mostly be contributed by the EU and Member State institutions for development and finances, but also the European Investment Bank and the European Bank for Reconstruction and Development, but will also leverage private investments from the Pre-Accession Assistance (IPA) III, Interreg, InvestEU and Horizon Europe. A European Export Credit Facility is being considered for establishment, to empower European companies in third countries where they have to face strong disadvantages.

Specific funding programmes are NDICI-GE, also known as "Global Europe", (Budget: €79billion) with the EFSD+ as its financial arm, backed by the Union's External Action Guarantee (EAG) with a budget of €40billion (out of a total of €53.4 billion) to decrease the risk of investments.

In total, the EFSD+ will provide €135 billion in investments guaranteed by the External Action Guarantee for Global Gateway projects, with up to €18 billion in grants and a further planned and estimated €145 billion in investment volumes by European financial and development institutions.

Approximately half of the anticipated €300 billion Global Gateway funds are to be raised via private investments that the EU hopes to generate with a system of financial guarantees.

Much of the Global Gateway funding proposed in 2021 was based on the re-classification of existing financial commitments from the EU's 2021-2027 budget as opposed to new resources.

In 2022 and 2023, the European Investment Bank provided 60 billion total investments as part of the Global Gateway initiative.

== Projects ==
In December 2022, the EU held a €387,000 virtual gala in the Metaverse to promote the Global Gateway project. A journalist from Devex claimed only six people attended the event, although a spokesperson for the EU disputed this claim..

=== Outlook ===
In 2021 comments on the Initiative, Ursula von der Leyen stated that the 6th European Union–African Union Summit would be the first case test for the Initiative, calling it a "flagship project". Other mentioned regions which are viable for funding and further partnership are Japan and India, as well as the Western Balkans, the Eastern Partnership, and the Southern Neighbourhood, but also Central Asia and Latin America.

=== Cooperation ===
Close partnership is planned with the American-led Build Back Better World initiative, which has similar goals. Both ventures will reinforce and support each other.

A significant achievement of the Global Gateway initiative was the Africa-Europe Investment Package, which allocated around €150 billion to enhance partnerships with African nations.

== Criticism ==
The Global Gateway initiative has faced criticism on several fronts. Members of the European Parliament have complained that EU project finance has been used to grant tenders to companies from China and other rival powers, effectively subsidising competitors the programme was intended to counter. A 2025 parliamentary question raised concerns that Chinese companies were being awarded contracts through corruption and government support, with projects implemented using Chinese workers and materials and involving limited participation by local communities.

African observers have questioned whether the initiative primarily serves European strategic interests, noting that funding is concentrated in sectors aligned with EU demand for critical minerals and green energy rather than African development priorities. Civil-society critics have made similar arguments in relation to flagship energy projects such as the SouthH2 Corridor hydrogen pipeline, which they say prioritise European energy imports while large parts of sub-Saharan Africa continue to lack access to electricity.

Other criticism has focused on transparency. The European Parliament’s development committee has criticised the lack of clarity surrounding the programme’s funding track record and the calculation of the headline figure of €306 billion; of the €150 billion pledged for Africa, less than €10 billion derives from EU budget guarantees.

The programme has also been criticised for a lack of substance. As of late 2022, concrete details on individual projects remained scarce, with the EU having published only high-level summaries of prospective initiatives.

Several projects presented under the Global Gateway banner had already been funded through pre-existing programmes rather than representing new investment. W. Gyude Moore, a policy fellow at the Center for Global Development, argued that the initiative had "not gone beyond just words."

== See also ==
- Build Back Better World
- Partnership for Global Infrastructure and Investment
- India-Middle East-Europe Economic Corridor
