= The Clean Network =

American government program and policy regarding China

The Clean Network is a U.S. government-led, bi-partisan effort announced by then U.S. Secretary of State Mike Pompeo in August 2020 to address what it describes as "the long-term threat to data privacy, security, human rights and principled collaboration posed to the free world from authoritarian malign actors." Its promoters state that it has resulted in an "alliance of democracies and companies," "based on democratic values." According to the Trump administration, the Clean Network is intended to implement internationally accepted digital trust standards across a coalition of trusted partners.

In December 2020, the United States announced that more than 60 nations, representing more than two thirds of the world's gross domestic product, and 200 telecom companies, have publicly committed to the principles of The Clean Network. This alliance of democracies includes 27 of the 30 NATO members; 26 of the 27 EU members, 31 of the 37 OECD nations, 11 of the 12 Three Seas nations as well as Japan, Israel, Australia, South Korea, Singapore, Taiwan, Canada, New Zealand, Vietnam and India.

The term "Clean Network" was coined by U.S. Undersecretary of State Keith Krach, who initially led the initiative, which includes officials in the Treasury Department, the Office of the U.S. Trade Representative, the National Security Council, and the Commerce Department. According to Bloomberg, Krach is credited with coordinating a variety of national and regional approaches to shape a more unified international project, relying on trust more than compulsion—a notable change in tone after years in which the Trump administration pursued a go-it-alone, "America First" strategy. On April 22, 2021, David Ignatius of the Washington Post stated that Krach's Clean Network provides continuity with the Biden administration's desire to get democracies together on the same playing field on technology.

Krach described the Huawei effort as a “beachhead” in a wider battle to unite against Chinese economic pressure in everything from investment to strategic materials that bears the hallmarks of 'good old fashioned' diplomacy, in contrast to a somewhat more confrontational style at the beginning of the administration. The Wall Street Journal wrote that the Clean Network will be perhaps the "most enduring foreign-policy legacy" of the last four years. Chinese foreign ministry spokesman Zhao Lijian referred to the Clean Network as a "US surveillance network" and "consolidation of US digital hegemony".

Researchers have noted that the announcement of the Clean Network was met with indifference in many major European countries, among concerns that the initiative would fragment the internet, with many also skeptical of US claims that Huawei poses an uncontrollable security threat. Several European countries in the Clean Network have since allowed Huawei to build their non-core 5G networks. A December 2021 op-ed by historian Arthur L. Herman and former U.S. national security advisor Robert C. O'Brien noted that only eight countries joined the US-led ban on Huawei's 5G equipment, compared to the more than 90 countries that signed up with Huawei, including several NATO members and regional allies. Herman and O'Brien argued that the US have not offered a viable alternative to Huawei's network, and failed to utilize wide spectrum options.

== Overview ==
On August 5, 2020, U.S. Secretary of State Mike Pompeo launched the Clean Network, which is the State Department’s comprehensive approach to address what it sees as the long-term threats to data privacy, security, and trusted collaboration posed by malign state actors. It is rooted in internationally accepted "Digital Trust Standards" and represents the execution of a multi-year, enduring strategy built on a coalition of trusted partners. According to Pompeo, the Clean Network emphasizes the importance of securing the entire 5G information technology ecosystem, including all extensions and accessories. The United States government sees these efforts as part of its commitment to an open, interoperable, reliable, and secure global Internet based on shared democratic values and respect for human rights.

The State Department looked for a range of commitments from countries and foreign telecom providers to build their 5G networks without Huawei or ZTE equipment, and offered financing from the Exim Bank or USAID for Ericsson and Nokia equipment. The State Department pressed countries and firms to sign MoUs and make official statements supporting the initiative. The EU formed a task force on 5G network security in March 2019, which released standards in January 2020, known as the EU Toolbox on 5G Cybersecurity, that did not explicitly ban Hauwei equipment, but instead suggested each country should evaluate high-risk suppliers. Countries that have committed to build networks implementing the EU Toolbox standards are counted as countries participating in the Clean Network.

United States Under Secretary of State for Economic Growth, Energy, and the Environment Keith Krach was the initial lead advocate of the U.S. government's push to prevent the use of potentially high-risk Chinese technology in sensitive systems around the world.

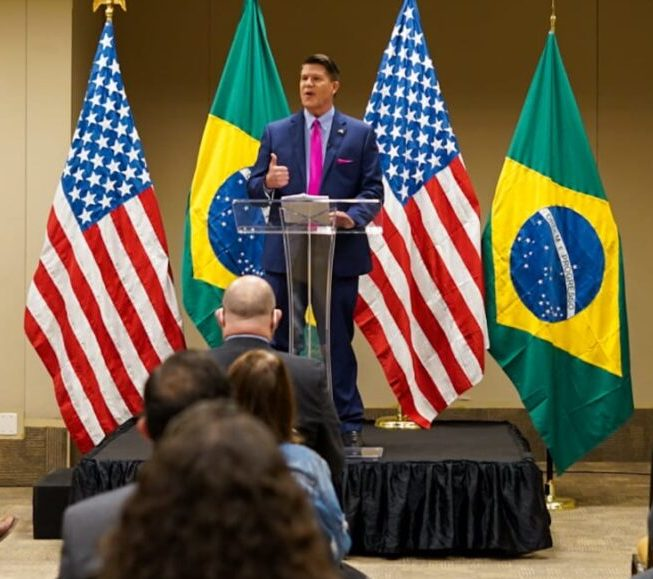
U.S. Undersecretary of State Krach in Brasília announcing Brazil becoming the 50th country to join Clean Network

According to Bloomberg, the Clean Network effort to create a united economic front has similarities with George Kennan's “long telegram” of 1946 to the Soviet Union. David Fidler, adjunct senior fellow for cybersecurity and global health at the Council on Foreign Relations, made this claim in a blog post in 2020. Kennan formulated the Cold War strategy of containment, which the Chinese claim is now being used against them.

Under Secretary Krach traveled to Asia, Europe, South America, and the Middle East to secure commitments from more governments to join the U.S. effort. "The success of the Clean Network has taken all the momentum away from Huawei," Krach said. "When we looked at this six months ago it looked like Huawei was unstoppable."

The Clean Network and the EU 5G Clean Toolbox, the U.S. government claims, have paved the way toward protecting citizens’ privacy, companies’ intellectual property, and countries’ national security from "aggressive intrusions" by malign actors, such as the Chinese Communist Party and its surveillance and data collection tools, such as Huawei. "Countries and companies are more and more asking the question, 'Who do we trust?'" Krach said. "The answer’s coming back, it’s certainly not Huawei because they’re the backbone of the Chinese Communist Party’s surveillance state."

The "Clean Network" brand replaced the original name of "Economic Prosperity Network" in which trusted democracies and the private sector form an economic alliance. It was conceived to have three components from initiatives that were already underway: a Clean Network for communications that is free from untrusted vendors; a Blue Dot Network for global infrastructure investment to counter China's "Belt and Road" initiative; and an Energy Resource Governance Initiative to secure supplies of rare earth metals and other strategic minerals.

== History ==
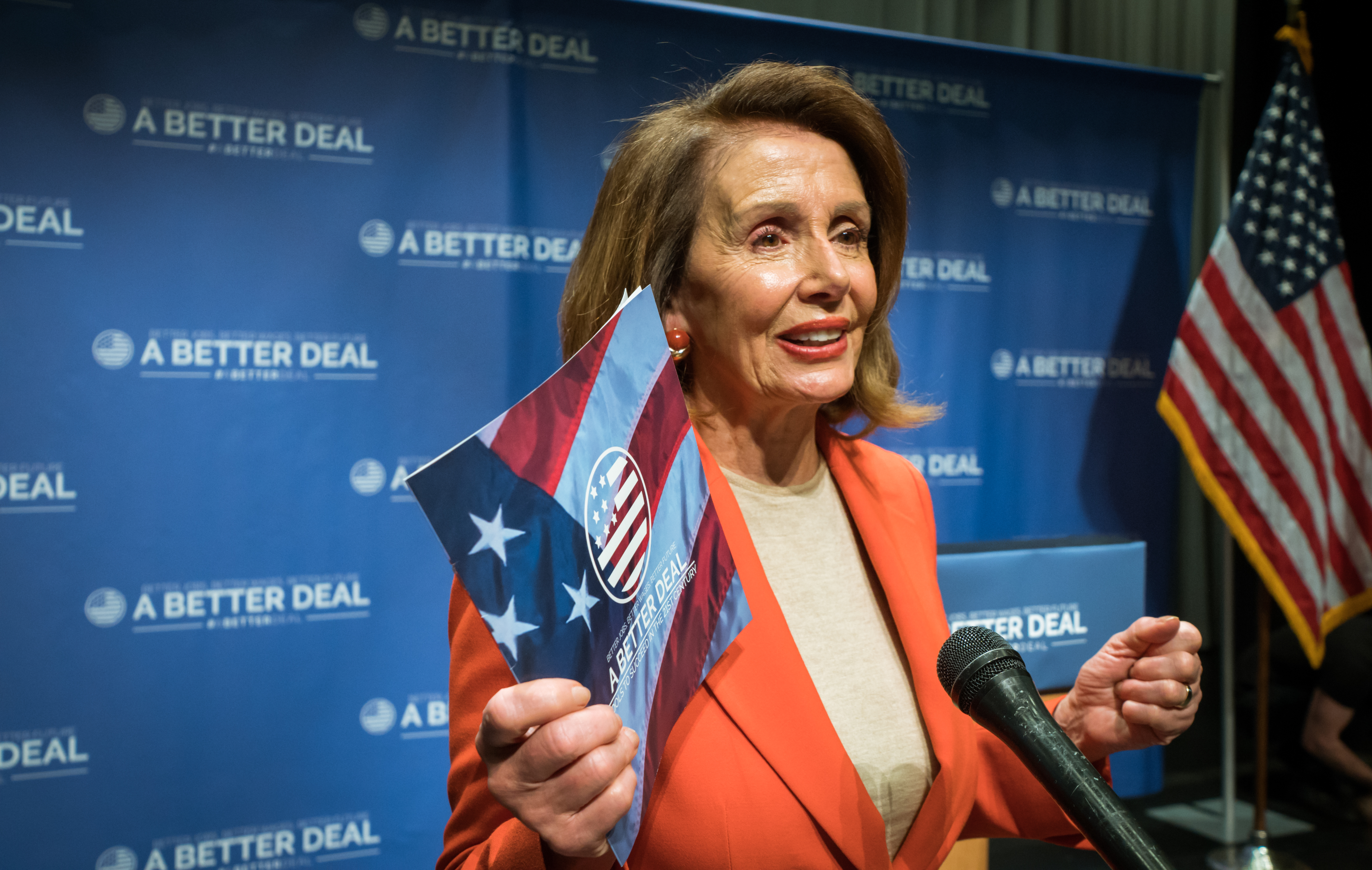
U.S. House Speaker Nancy Pelosi criticized Huawei's 5G rollout in European countries in 2020.

- February 14, 2020 at the 2020 Munich Security Conference, U.S. House Speaker Nancy Pelosi warned European countries they will "choose autocracy over democracy" if they let Huawei take part in rolling out 5G technology, in a sign of the bipartisan US political pressure over the Chinese company.
- February 18, 2020, at a press conference in London, Huawei's president of carrier business Ryan Ding announced, "We have 91 commercial 5G contracts worldwide, including 47 from Europe."
- March 3, 2020 Senate Minority Leader Chuck Schumer (D-NY) led a bipartisan group of senators in urging Parliament to reconsider the Johnson government's decision to allow Huawei to supply some of the United Kingdom's 5G telecommunications structure.
- May 13, 2020, the Center for Strategic and International Studies publishes Clean Network's digital trust standard.
- May 18, 2020, the "5G Trifecta" announced which represents the onshoring of TSMC's semiconductors, locking down on Huawei's advanced semiconductors and the global roll out of the Clean Path stratagem.
- June 3, 2020, Canadian major telcos effectively lock Huawei out of 5G build. The decision of Bell and TELUS to shift to Ericsson and Nokia has left Huawei with no major carrier customers in Canada.
- June 10, 2020, Krach's bipartisan semiconductor bill, Chips for America Act, is introduced by Senators Warner and Cornyn.
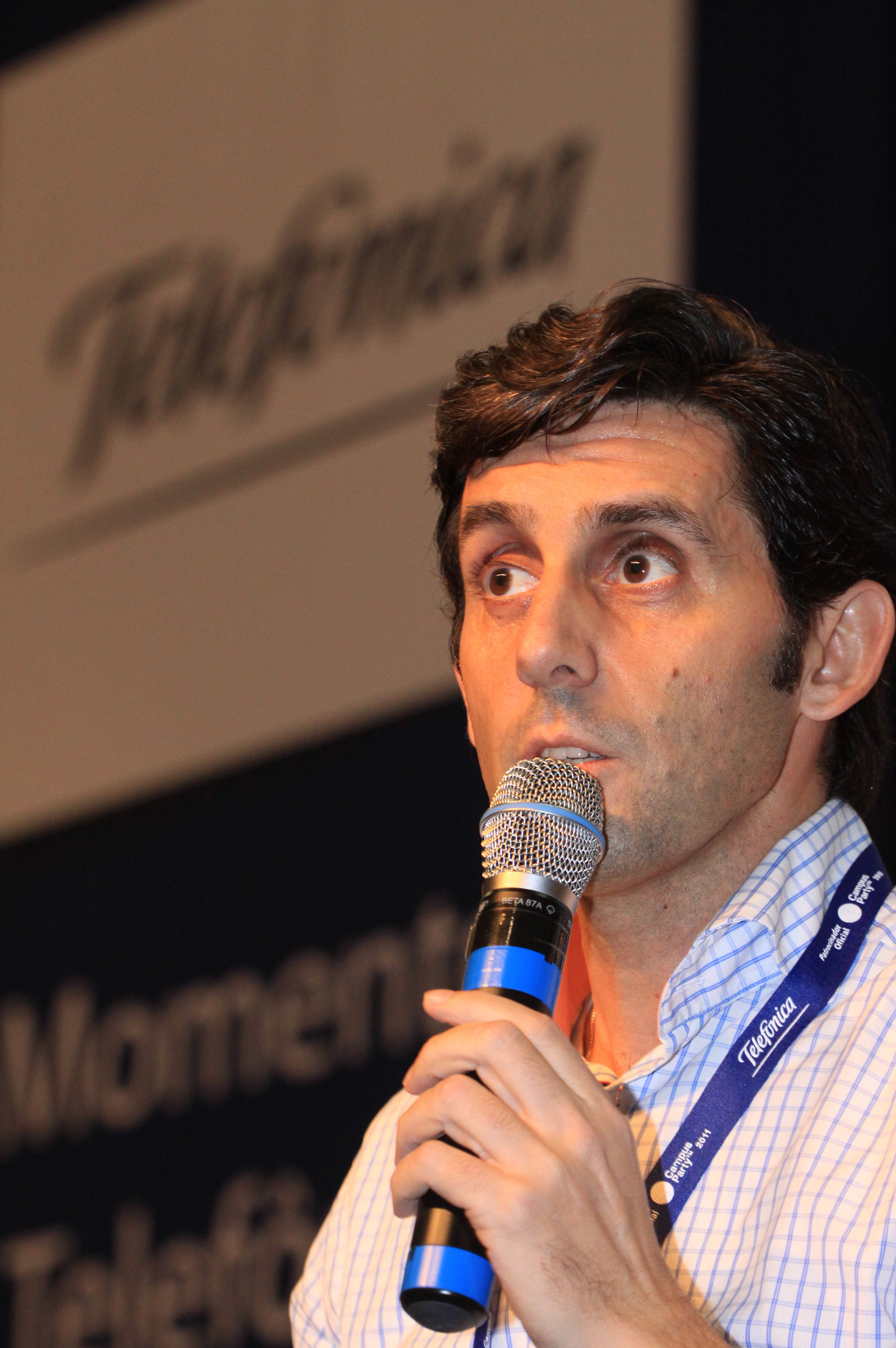
  José María Álvarez-Pallete, presidente of Telefónica Latínoamericana
- June 24, 2020, Telefónica CEO and Chairman José María declares, "Telefónica is proud to be a 5G Clean Network company. Telefónica Spain and O2 (UK) are fully clean networks, and Telefónica Deutschland (Germany) and Vivo (Brazil) will be soon without equipment from any untrusted vendors."
- June 25, 2020, Under Secretary of State Krach welcomes the Czech Republic, Norway, Poland, Estonia, Romania, Denmark, Greece, New Zealand, Japan, Australia, Israel, and Latvia as members of Clean Network.
- June 29, 2020, Nokia and Ericsson chosen as Singapore's 5G network providers.
- July 4, 2020, Under Secretary Krach ties China's surveillance state with genocide and slave labor in Xinjiang on Cavuto Live.
- July 14, 2020, the United Kingdom announces plans to ban Huawei from future 5G networks. Specifically, UK mobile providers are being banned from buying new Huawei 5G equipment after December 31.
- July 22, 2020, French authorities limited Huawei by telling telecoms operators planning to buy Huawei equipment that they would not be able to renew licenses for the gear once they expire in 2028.
- August 5, 2020 - Announcement of the expansion of the Clean Network to include Clean Carrier, Clean Store, Clean Apps, Clean Cloud, and Clean Cable.
- August 6, 2020 - President Trump signed two executive orders exercising his authority under the International Emergency Economic Powers Act (IEEPA) to address the alleged threats posed by apps such as TikTok and WeChat.
- August 10, 2020 - The Clean Network grew to 30 Clean Countries and Territories along with some of largest telecommunications companies, including Orange, Jio, Singtel, Telstra, SK, KT and all telcos in Canada, Norway, Vietnam, and Taiwan.
- August 11, 2020, U.S. State Department called on its allies and partners in government and industry around the world to join the growing tide to secure data from the Chinese Communist Party (CCP)'s surveillance state and China's Great Firewall and said “Momentum for The Clean Network is growing.”
- August 24, 2020, India phases out equipment from Chinese companies from its telecom's networks over an escalating border dispute.
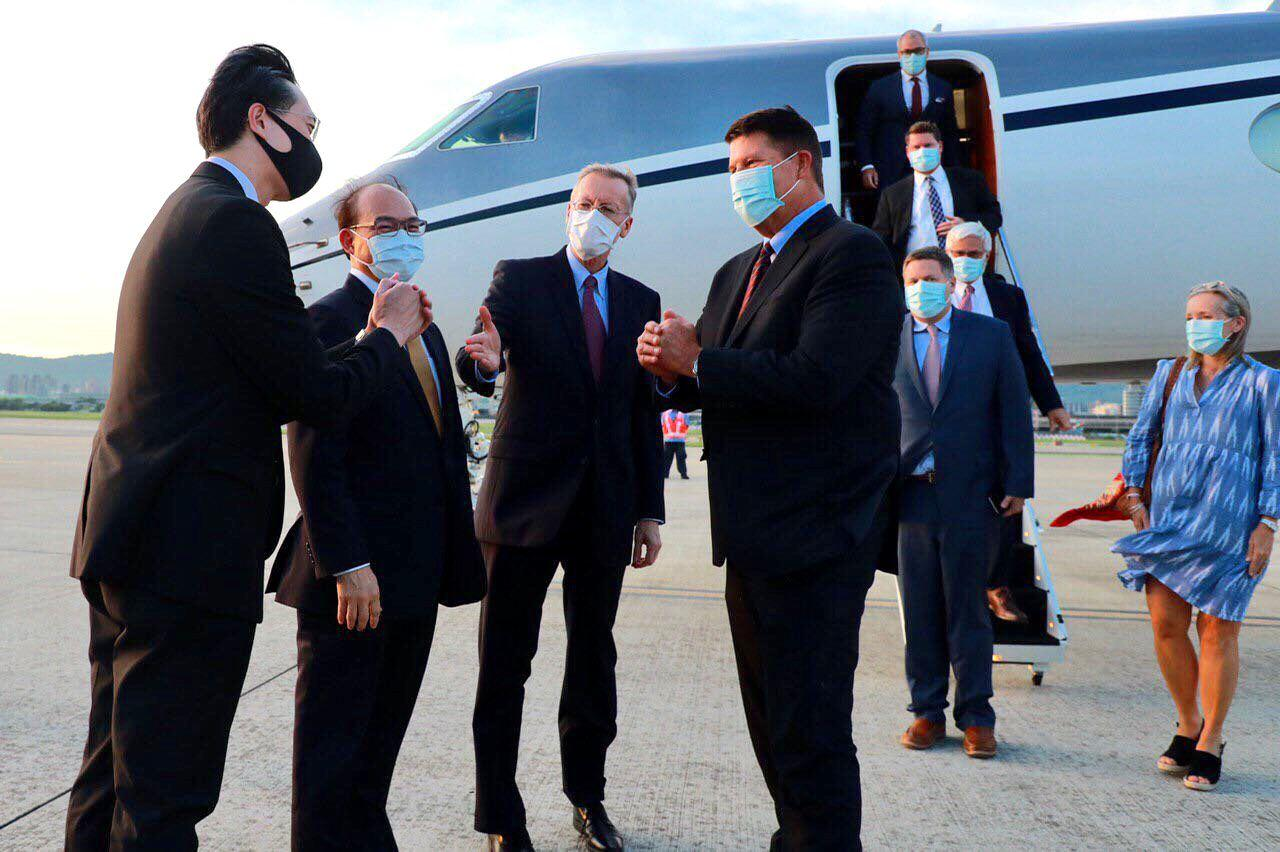
- The US delegation arrives in Taiwan to discuss The Clean Network.
  September 18, 2020, Krach became the highest-ranking State Department official since 1979 to visit Taiwan. He was there to represent the United States at the funeral of former president Lee. Krach welcomed Taiwan to the Clean Network with Taiwan's President Tsai. "Taiwan is a great partner, a great friend," Krach said. "They're a role model for capitalism and democracy in that part of the world."
- September 22, 2020, U.S. Under Secretary of State Keith Krach begins European Clean Network tour including EU and NATO headquarters, to discuss the move toward clean 5G infrastructure and the goal of building a Transatlantic Clean Network.
- September 28, 2020, Krach and Austrian Federal Minister Elisabeth Köstinger meet to discuss the U.S.-Austria partnership and multiple areas of economic collaboration through the Clean Network and the EU 5G Clean Toolbox.
- September 30, 2020 – U.S. Under Secretary of State Keith Krach and EU Commissioner Thierry Breton issued a joint statement on the synergies between the Clean Network and the EU 5G Clean Toolbox. Toolbox meets criteria for being part of the Clean Network.
- October 1, 2020, Portugal commits to implementing the EU 5G Clean Toolbox, joins Clean Network.
- October 2, 2020, Spain commits to implementing the EU 5G Clean Toolbox, joins Clean Network.
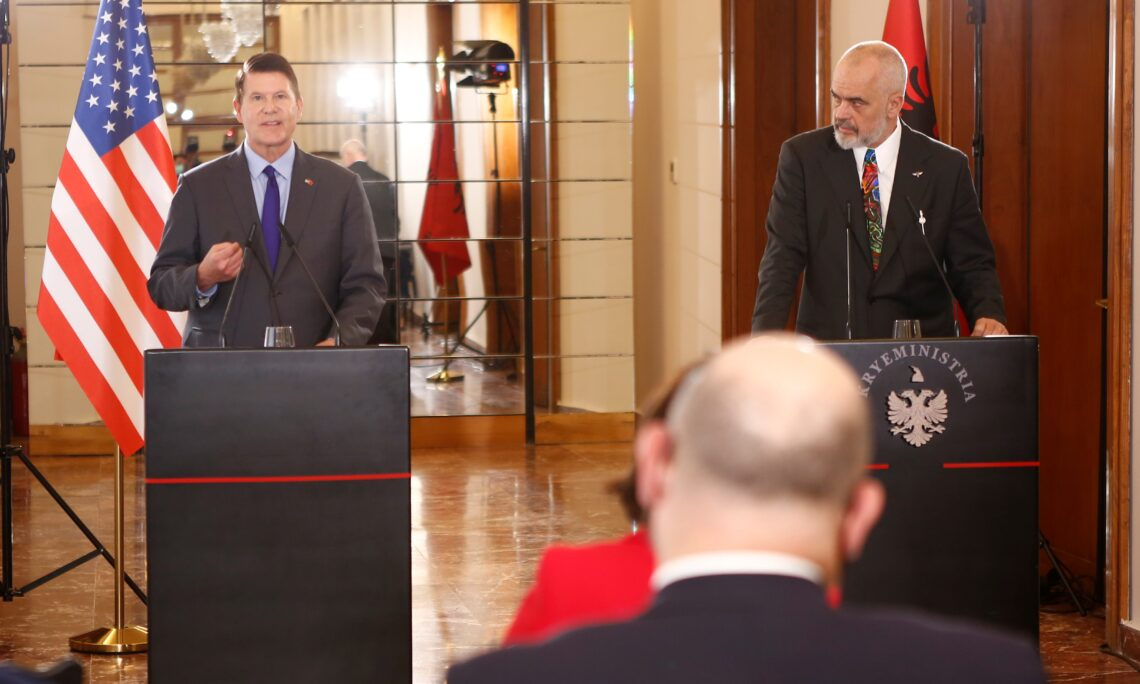
- Albanian Prime Minister Edi Rama and US Under Secretary of State Keith Krach in Clean Network press conference
  October 3, 2020, Albania: Prime Minister Edi Rama stated, "Albania sees its role in the region not just as a constructive role in building peace and strengthening dialogue, but as a proactive role in the 5G Clean Path." In addition to Albania's commitment to 5G Clean Path, Under Secretary Krach and Albania's Finance Minister Anila Denaj signed a Memorandum of Economic Cooperation, laying the foundation on 5G security.
- October 4, 2020, Germany prepares legislation that included two-phase reviews in building its 5G network.
- October 8, 2020, Luxembourg joins Clean Network.
- October 9, 2020, Belgium announce replacement of Huawei, joins the Clean Network. The Belgian capital, Brussels, is home to the European Union's executive body and had been 100% reliant on Chinese vendors for its radio networks. Belgium has now awarded their 5G contracts to Nokia instead of Huawei to complete their transition to a Clean Country.
- October 14, 2020 – Clean Network grew to over 40 Clean Countries, and 50 Clean Telcos.
- October 17, 2020 – Clean Network added companies including Oracle, HP, Reliance Jio, NEC, Fujitsu, Cisco, NTT, SoftBank and VMware.
- October 20, 2020, Cyprus joins Clean Network. U.S. Undersecretary of State Krach and Cypriot Minister for Digital Policy Kyriacos Kokkinos sign a memorandum of understanding regarding "Clean" technologies in Cyprus.
- October 21, 2020 – Three Seas Initiative announced support for the Clean Network at annual conference in Estonia.
- October 23, 2020 – US Under Secretary of State Krach signed three Clean Network memorandums of understanding with Prime Ministers in Bulgaria, Kosovo and North Macedonia.
- October 23, 2020 – Slovakia signs Joint Declaration on 5G Security, joins Clean Network.
- October 31, 2020 – Clean Network grew to 49 country members, representing two-thirds of global economic output.
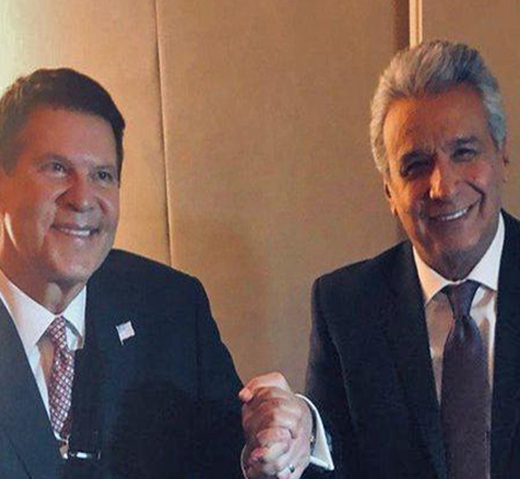
- US Under Secretary of State Krach clasping hands with Ecuadorian President Lenín Moreno
  November 7, 2020 – Krach begins Latin American Clean Network tour to Brazil, Chile, Ecuador, Panama, and the Dominican Republic to meet with government officials and business leaders.
- November 10, 2020 – Brazil joins Clean Network as the 50th member.
- November 22, 2020 – Ecuador and the Dominican Republic joined The Clean Network.
- November 25, 2020 – Huawei sells off Honor phone business to a state-led consortium.
- December 23, 2020 – Ukraine announces, intent to join Clean Network because "joining the Clean Network will pave the way for more private sector investment in Ukraine, in particular the innovation sector."
- January 12, 2021 – Nauru announces joining The Clean Network.
- January 14, 2021 – Palau joins The Clean Network.
- January 15, 2021 – The European nation of Georgia signs MOU to join The Clean Network.
- May 22, 2021 – In Ethiopia, a Vodafone-led group with financial backing of the International Development Finance Corp wins contract to build a nationwide 5G-capable wireless network against Huawei.
- April 12, 2021 – Harvard Business School published "The Clean Network and the Future of Global Technology Competition."

== Impact on Huawei and similar companies ==
The United States issued warnings about the risks of reliance on Chinese telecommunication equipment, but acceptance of Huawei products increased around the world. According to Under Secretary Krach in late 2020, "when we looked at this six months ago it looked like Huawei was unstoppable. It looked like they were going to run the table in Europe and everywhere else.” At a February 18, 2020 press conference in London, Huawei's president of carrier business Ryan Ding announced, "We have 91 commercial 5G contracts worldwide, including 47 from Europe." Following the U.S. government's campaign to reduce international reliance on Chinese-made telecommunications equipment, Huawei's deals outside of China decreased from 91 to 12.

According to the United States, Chinese national intelligence laws can be used to force companies like Huawei, ZTE, and other Chinese telecommunication equipment vendors to turn over any information or data upon the request of the Chinese Communist Party government. The U.S. State Department argues that these laws thus make Huawei and similar vendors "an arm of the People’s Republic of China (PRC) surveillance state."

Huawei was founded in 1987 by Ren Zhengfei, a veteran of the People's Liberation Army's engineering corps. Many of the company's crucial first contracts were with the Chinese army. In 1996, the Chinese government banned competition from foreign suppliers, and Huawei may have received a $30 billion line of credit from the China Development Bank, along with other state-backed financing. This gave the company control over the Chinese domestic market and enabled it to fuel rapid international expansion by offering discounts. Forced technology transfers from foreign companies, and several cases of technology theft also contributed the company's growth, including the theft of router software from Cisco and a jury finding that Huawei committed industrial espionage against T-Mobile.

According to the United States, the rise of Huawei was the fulfillment of decades of careful planning. Supported by the CCP, Huawei benefited from state protection against foreign competitors, billions in funding from the Chinese government, as well as forced technology transfers and well documented instances of outright technology theft. Secretary of State Mike Pompeo said, "Huawei was a trojan horse for Chinese intelligence and the CCP surveillance-state."

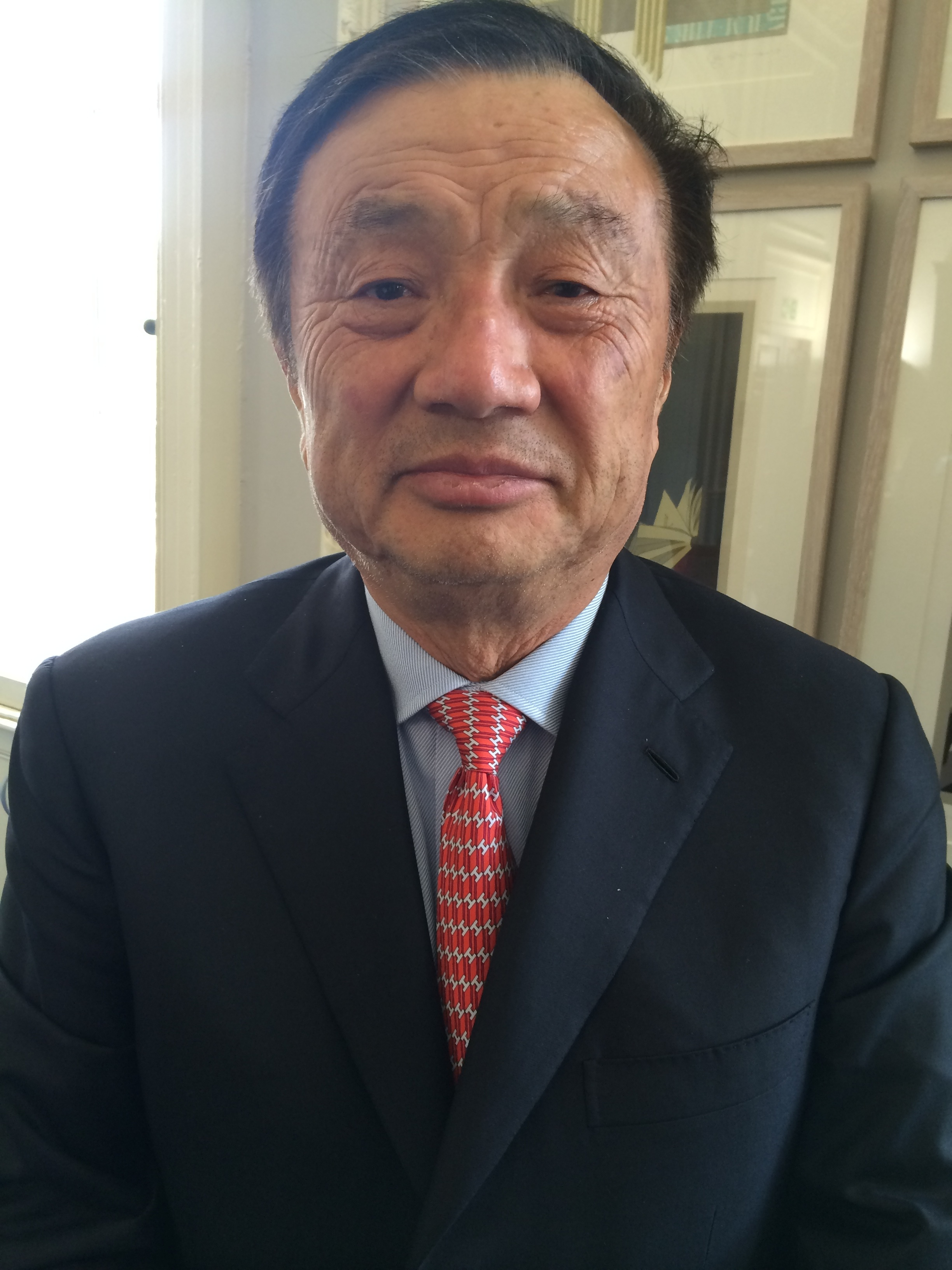
Ren Zhengfei, founder of Huawei

The Chinese government rejects the accusation of bullying. In July, after U.S. regulators labeled Huawei and ZTE Corp. as threats to national security, a Foreign Ministry spokesman accused the U.S. of "abusing state power" to hurt Chinese companies "without any evidence." Huawei's U.S. website says: "Everything we develop and deliver to our customers is secure, trustworthy, and this has been consistent over a track record of 30 years." ZTE says it "attaches utmost importance to our customers’ security values."

The U.S. claims that by building an alliance of democracies built on "democratic values" embodied in the Trust Standards, it has garnered international support and bipartisan backing.

On April 12, 2021, Harvard Business School published a case study on "The Clean Network and the Future of Global Technology Competition," noting that "the controversial program to some heralded a new era of multilateral, democratic governance of the internet and to others augured a "splinternet" where market participants and countries had to choose between the U.S. and China."

== Clean Network lines of effort ==
According to the U.S. Department of State, the following are the current lines of effort of the Clean Network:

=== Clean 5G Infrastructure ===
Clean 5G Infrastructure does not use any transmission, control, computing, or storage equipment from untrusted IT vendors, such as Huawei and ZTE, which are required by Chinese law to comply with directives of the CCP.

=== Clean Path ===
The Clean Path requires all network traffic from 5G standalone networks entering or exiting U.S. diplomatic facilities to transit only through equipment provided by trusted vendors to guard against untrusted vendors by blocking their ability to intercept and disseminate sensitive information to malign actors.

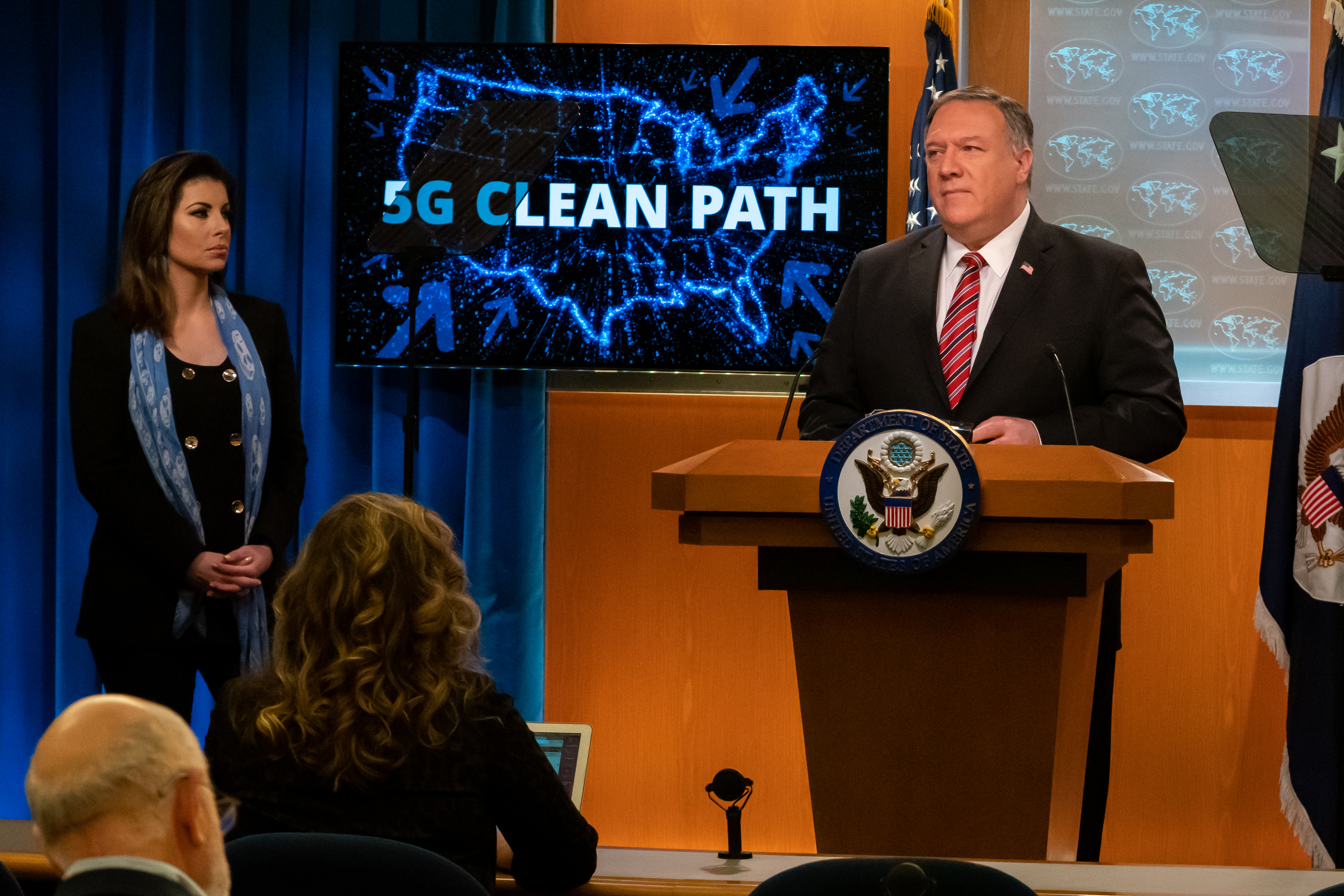
Secretary of State Mike Pompeo describes the 5G Clean Path on April 29, 2020.

As first described by Secretary Pompeo on April 29, 2020, the 5G Clean Path is an attempt to create an end-to-end communication path that does not use any equipment from untrusted IT vendors. This includes transmission, control, computing, or storage equipment. The concern raised by Secretary Pompeo is that those vendors are required to comply with directives of the Chinese Communist Party, including possibly revealing private or confidential information. Similarly, mobile data traffic entering U.S. diplomatic systems will be subject to stringent requirements to protect its security.

=== Clean Carrier ===
The United States of America seeks to ensure untrusted People's Republic of China carriers are not directly connected with U.S. telecommunications networks because the U.S. believes that such companies pose a danger to U.S. national security.

=== Clean Store ===
The U.S. believes that PRC apps in mobile phone app stores threaten its citizens' "privacy, proliferate viruses, censor content, and spread propaganda and disinformation." President Trump previously signed two Executive Orders addressing alleged threats posed by TikTok and WeChat, on the basis that TikTok and WeChat capture vast swathes of data from their users and are subject to Chinese jurisdiction – which may lead to them being compelled to turn over private information to the CCP. The U.S. stated its goal to protect American people's sensitive personal and business information on their mobile phones from exploitation and theft.

=== Clean Apps ===
The United States defined "Clean Apps" as a program to prevent untrusted smartphone manufacturers from pre-installing or marketing untrusted apps on their apps store. The United States Department of State claimed that Huawei, an arm of the PRC surveillance state is trading on the innovations and reputations of leading U.S. and foreign companies. The department recommended that these companies should remove their apps from Huawei's app store to ensure they are not partnering with a human rights abuser.

=== Clean Cloud ===
The United States defined the "Clean Cloud" as an effort "to prevent U.S. citizens' most sensitive personal information and businesses' most valuable intellectual property, including COVID-19 vaccine research, from being stored and processed on cloud-based systems built or operated by untrusted vendors, such as Alibaba, Baidu, China Mobile, China Telecom, and Tencent."

=== Clean Cable ===
The United States defined the "Clean Cable" as an effort to "ensure the undersea cables connecting [the United States] to the global internet are not subverted for intelligence gathering by the PRC at hyper scale." The U.S. also announced a goal to work with other nations to ensure that undersea cables in other locations around the world are built by trusted vendors.

=== Clean Telcos ===
In December 2020, the United States announced more than 60 nations, representing two-thirds of the world's gross domestic product and 180 telecom companies have publicly committed to the principles of The Clean Network.

"Clean Telcos" include Reliance Jio in India, Orange in France, Telefónica in Spain, O2 in the United Kingdom, Telstra in Australia, SK Telecom and KT in South Korea, NTT Docomo and SoftBank in Japan, Hrvatski Telekom in Croatia, Tele2 in Estonia, Cosmote in Greece, Three in Ireland, LMT in Latvia, Ziggo in the Netherlands, Plus in Poland, Telefónica Deutschland in Germany, Vivo in Brazil, Chunghwa in Taiwan, TDC in Denmark, O2 in the United Kingdom, Singtel, Starhub, and M1 in Singapore and all the major telcos in Canada, Japan, Taiwan, Luxembourg, and the United States.

== Clean Trust standards principles ==
=== The Trust Principle Doctrine ===
The ‘Trust Principle’ is based on democratic values which includes respect for the rule of law, property, press, human rights, and national sovereignty, protection of labor and the environment, and standards for transparency, integrity, and reciprocity. Under Secretary Krach deployed the “Trust Principle” doctrine building the Clean Network Alliance of Democracies to protect global 5G infrastructure and creating a usable model for overcoming authoritarian economic threats. "Trust Principle" doctrine serves as a new basis for 21st century international relations and as a peaceful alternative to China's “Power Principle,” of intimidation, retaliation, coercion, and retribution. Leon Panetta, the Secretary of Defense under President Barack Obama said, “The Clean Network pioneered a trust-based model for countering authoritarian aggression across all areas of techno-economic competition.”

=== Digital Trust Standard ===
The Center for Strategic and International Studies (CSIS) assembled a group of 25 experts from Asian, European, and U.S. companies and research centers. Their stated goal was to develop criteria to assess the trustworthiness of telecommunications equipment suppliers. The group produced a set of "Criteria for Security and Trust in Telecommunications Networks and Services" that are believed to provide governments and network operators additional tools to evaluate trustworthiness and security of equipment and suppliers, in tandem with the European Union's 5G Toolbox and the Prague Proposals.

=== Prague Proposals ===
In May 2019, government officials from more than 30 countries, met in Prague with representatives from the European Union, the North Atlantic Treaty Organization, and industry. They discussed national security, economic, and commercial considerations that must be part of each country's evaluation of 5G vendors. They produced a document called the Prague Proposals that contain recommendations and principles for nations as they design, construct, and administer their 5G infrastructure.

=== EU 5G cybersecurity Toolbox ===
On September 30, 2020, U.S. Under Secretary of State Keith Krach and EU Commissioner Thierry Breton issued a joint statement on the synergies between the Clean Network and the EU 5G Clean Toolbox.

The 5G cybersecurity Toolbox was released by the European Commission with EU Member States. At the time of release the EC noted that European 5G suppliers are likely to comply with its directives. The Toolbox provides definitions and measurements on how to avoid the use of "high-risk" suppliers in the network. This is intended to include the Radio Access Network. Since January 2020, multiple EU Member States have announced steps to fulfill the 5G cybersecurity Toolbox's recommendations.

=== Implementing the 5G EU Clean Toolbox ===
In March 2019, a number of EU the Heads of State or Governments called for a joint approach to the security of 5G networks. Following this, the European Commission adopted the Commission Recommendation on the Cybersecurity of 5G, which set out a number of actions at national and Union level to strengthen the cybersecurity of 5G networks.

=== Core principles ===
The proponents of the Clean Network state that Clean Network partnerships are grounded in democratic values that form the basis of trust: integrity, accountability, transparency, reciprocity, and respect for the rule of law, property, labor, sovereignty, human rights, and the planet. This creates a “high-integrity, level playing field for reliable collaboration with the understanding that there is no prosperity without liberty.”

=== Human rights and clean labor practices ===
A key tenet for the Clean Network's Trust Principles is human rights. Huawei is allegedly the backbone of the CCP's surveillance state and is accused of assisting human rights abuses against the people in the mass-detention of Uyghurs in the Xinjiang re-education camps and employing forced Uyghur labor in its supply chain.

== Clean Network collaboration ==
=== European Union ===
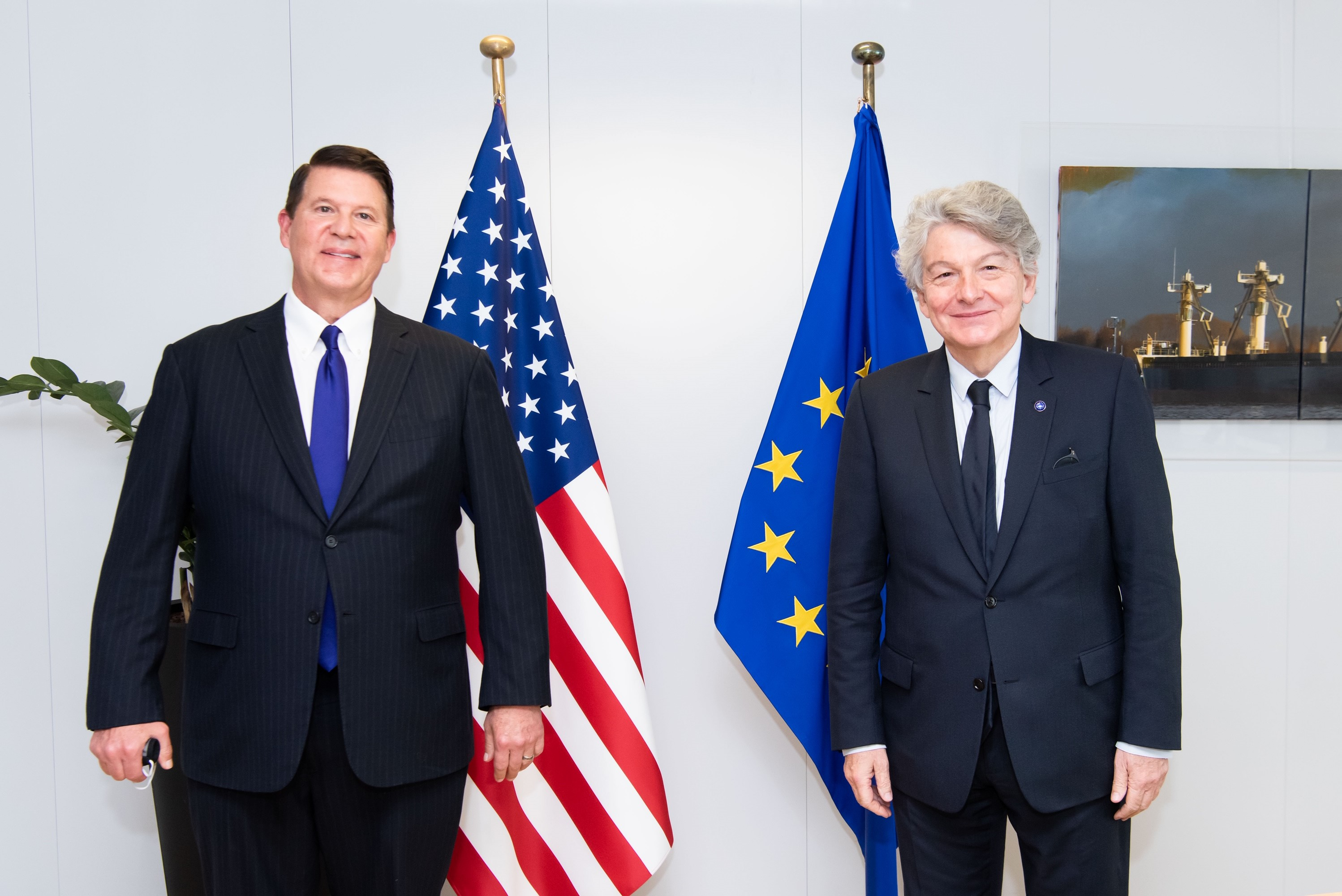
U.S. Undersecretary of State Keith Krach and EU Commissioner for Internal Market Mr. Thierry Breton meet on 30 September 2020.

On September 30, 2020, U.S. Under Secretary of State Keith Krach and EU Commissioner for Internal Market Thierry Breton met in Brussels to discuss cooperation in securing telecommunications infrastructure. They also sought ways to further advance U.S.-EU digital cooperation and secure technology supply chains.

They stated that this is essential to protect peoples’ personal data, companies’ intellectual property, and national security. According to their discussions, both the Clean Network program and the 5G Toolbox share the same goal of developing, deploying, and commercializing 5G networks based on the principles of free competition, transparency, and the rule of law. Under Secretary Keith Krach and Commissioner Thierry Breton urged stakeholders to carefully weigh the long-term impact of allowing “high-risk suppliers” access – directly or indirectly – to their 5G networks when building their telecommunications infrastructure and services.

On September 30, 2020, U.S. Under Secretary of State Keith Krach and EU Commissioner Thierry Breton met in Brussels to discuss cooperation in securing telecommunications infrastructure. They also sought ways to further advance U.S.-EU digital cooperation and secure technology supply chains.

=== NATO ===
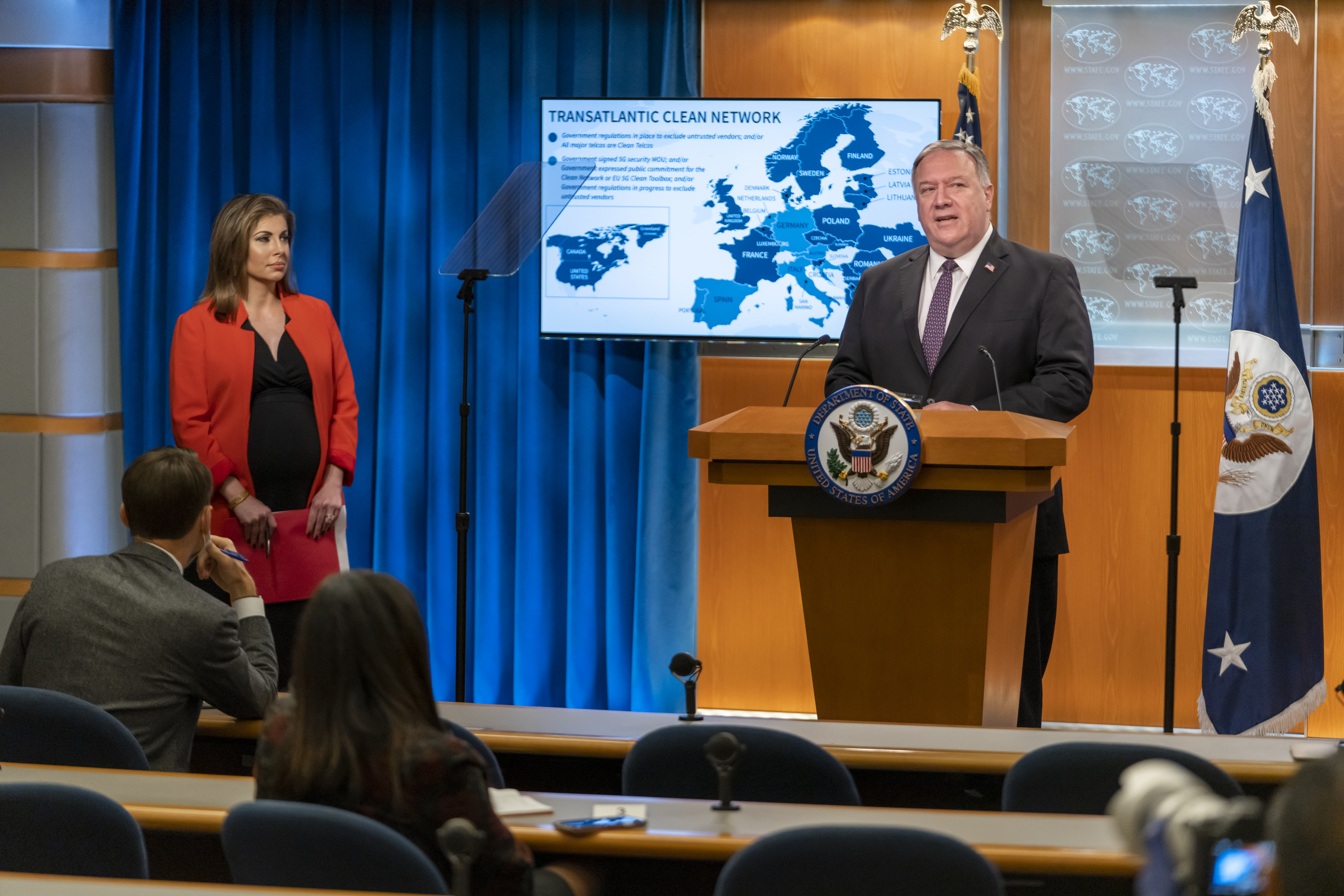
Secretary of State Michael R. Pompeo, with Spokesperson Morgan Ortagus, describe the role of NATO in maintaining the Clean Network.

On September 30, 2020, NATO Deputy Secretary General Mircea Geoana noted that 25 NATO countries have committed to being "Clean Countries". He emphasized the strategic importance of having a secure 5G Clean NATO Network, which is non-fractured, because, he said, "the Alliance is only as strong as its weakest link." He also praised the U.S.-EU joint statement on the synergies between the Clean Network and the EU 5G Clean Toolbox.

=== Three Seas Initiative ===
On October 21, 2020, at an annual conference in Estonia, the Three Seas Initiative announced its support for the Clean Network.

As of late 2020, 27 NATO members have committed to being "Clean Countries" on both sides of the Atlantic by allowing only trusted vendors in their 5G networks. Between September 21 and October 4, 2020, Under Secretary of State Keith Krach visited eight European countries, including EU and NATO headquarters, to discuss the goal of building a Transatlantic Clean Network. Under Secretary of State Krach said, "Countries and companies are terrified of China’s retaliation. The CCP cannot retaliate against everyone. That is where the EU comes in, the Transatlantic Alliance comes in, NATO comes in. The bottom line is the tide has turned. Countries and companies now understand that the central issue is not about technology, but trust."

== Clean Network developments ==
=== The "5G trifecta" ===
The Washington Times described U.S. Undersecretary of State Keith Krach's initial move to put Huawei on the defensive as the "5G trifecta in competition with China" based on onshoring of Taiwan Semiconductor Manufacturing Company's (TSMC) semiconductors, the prohibition of advanced semiconductors from Huawei, and the roll-out of the Clean Path strategy. The 5G trifecta served as the launchpad for the Clean Network.

First, Krach's team partnered with the Commerce Department to secure an announcement from TSMC that it will build the world's most advanced five-nanometer chip fabrication facility in Arizona. This was the largest onshoring in American history and seen by the United States as a leap forward in securing the semiconductor supply chain and 5G security for the United States and its partners. It provides a "Made in America" source for chips powering everything from smartphones, to 5G base stations, to advanced artificial intelligence.

The New York Times called the onshoring announcement of $12 billion semiconductor plant a win for the Trump administration, which has called for building up U.S. manufacturing capabilities and has criticized the fragility of a tech supply chain heavily centered in China.

The impact catalyzed a critical piece of legislation that Krach championed called the Chip Act, a bipartisan, bicameral bill that will help bring semiconductors production vital to national security back to the United States. Republican Senator John Cornyn and Democrat Senator Mark Warner said, "America's innovation in semiconductors undergirds our entire innovation economy, driving the advances we see in autonomous vehicles, supercomputing, IoT devices and more. Unfortunately, our complacency has allowed our adversaries to catch up." The Chip Act reinvests in this national priority by providing targeted tax incentives for advanced manufacturing, funding research in microelectronics, and emphasizing the need for multilateral engagement with our allies in bringing greater attention to security threats to the global supply chain. The Bill passed unanimously in the House and 96–4 in the Senate.

Second, the State Department successfully launched its 5G Clean Path initiative, which requires all 5G data entering or exiting facilities to transit only through trusted equipment, and never through from untrusted vendors such as Huawei and ZTE.

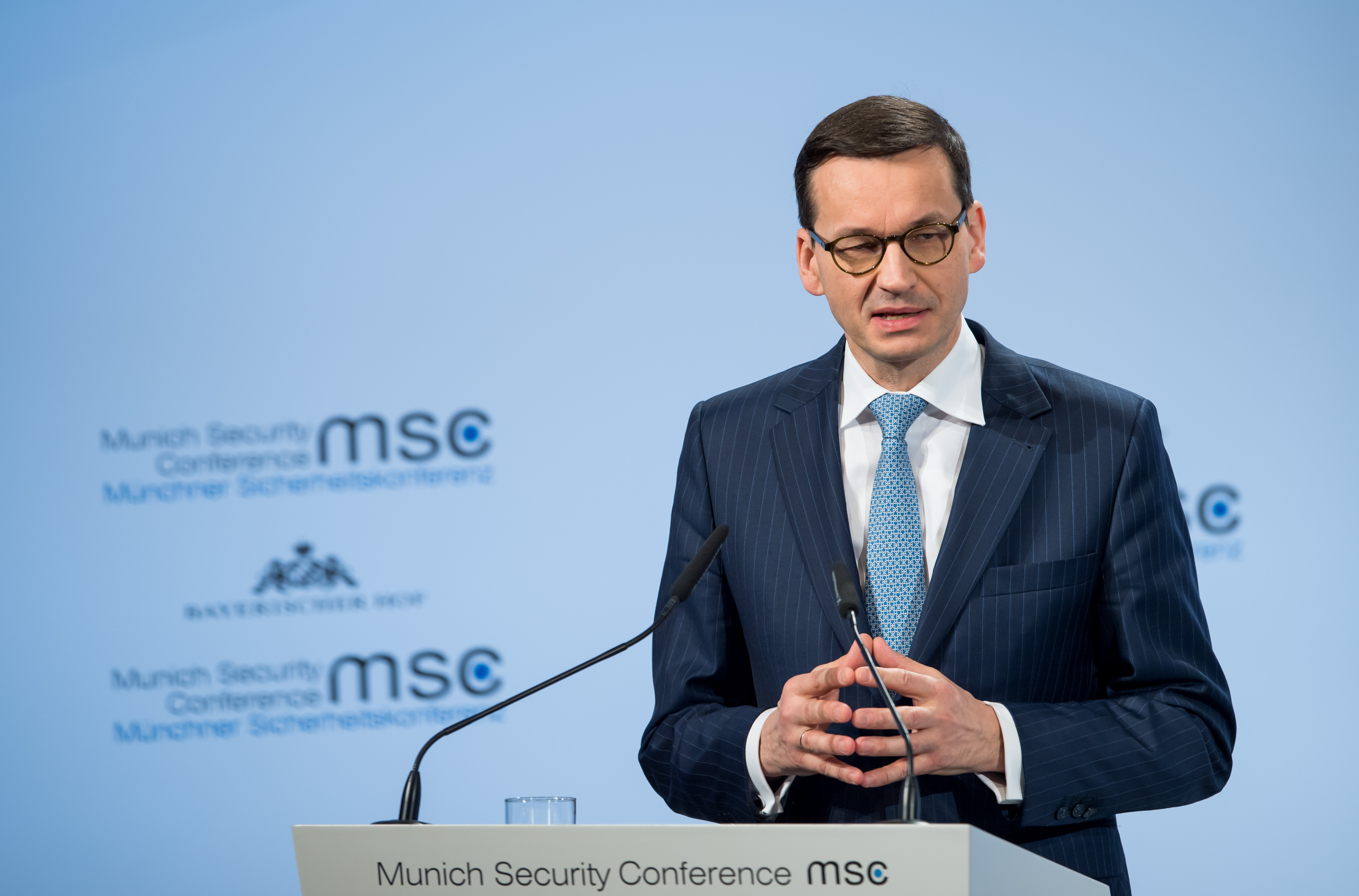
Polish Prime Minister Mateusz Morawiecki called on other European countries to adopt a Clean Path.

Many companies and countries like Japan, Albania and Taiwan have already adopted the Clean Path. Polish Prime Minister Mateusz Morawiecki called on all countries and companies, especially the Europeans, to adopt a Clean Path to secure their 5G networks. U.S. Ambassador to NATO Kay Bailey Hutchison has called for a 5G Clean NATO Network with a Clean Path feeding into its military bases.

The Clean Path stratagem raised the cost for telco operators who were contemplating Huawei 5G by creating a critical mass of network traffic from their customers that required that all sources feeding into it had to run on only trusted equipment.

Third, Krach's State Department team succeeded in expanding the Foreign Direct Product Rule to prevent Huawei from "dodging" U.S. export controls. Senate Democratic Leader Chuck Schumer (D-NY) and Senator Tom Cotton (R-AR), joined by over a dozen other senators, sent a bipartisan letter to President Trump because they were concerned about Commerce Department saying it would issue licenses to allow U.S. firms to conduct business with Huawei. This rule effectively blocked Huawei's access to advanced semiconductors required for 5G and sophisticated smartphones, leading to Huawei selling its Honor budget smartphone brand to a Chinese consortium six months later.

=== Diplomatic initiatives ===
==== Latin America ====
As of November 2020, the United States announced that more than 50 nations were committed to the principles of The Clean Network. On November 10, 2020, Brazil became the 50th member. On November 22, Secretary of State Mike Pompeo announced that Ecuador, and the Dominican Republic also joined The Clean Network. Undersecretary Krach said "the participation of the Dominican Republic in the Clean Network paves the way for the expansion of investments by the US private sector and strengthens mutual guarantees for like-minded partners in the region and other parts of the world."

==== Other nations ====
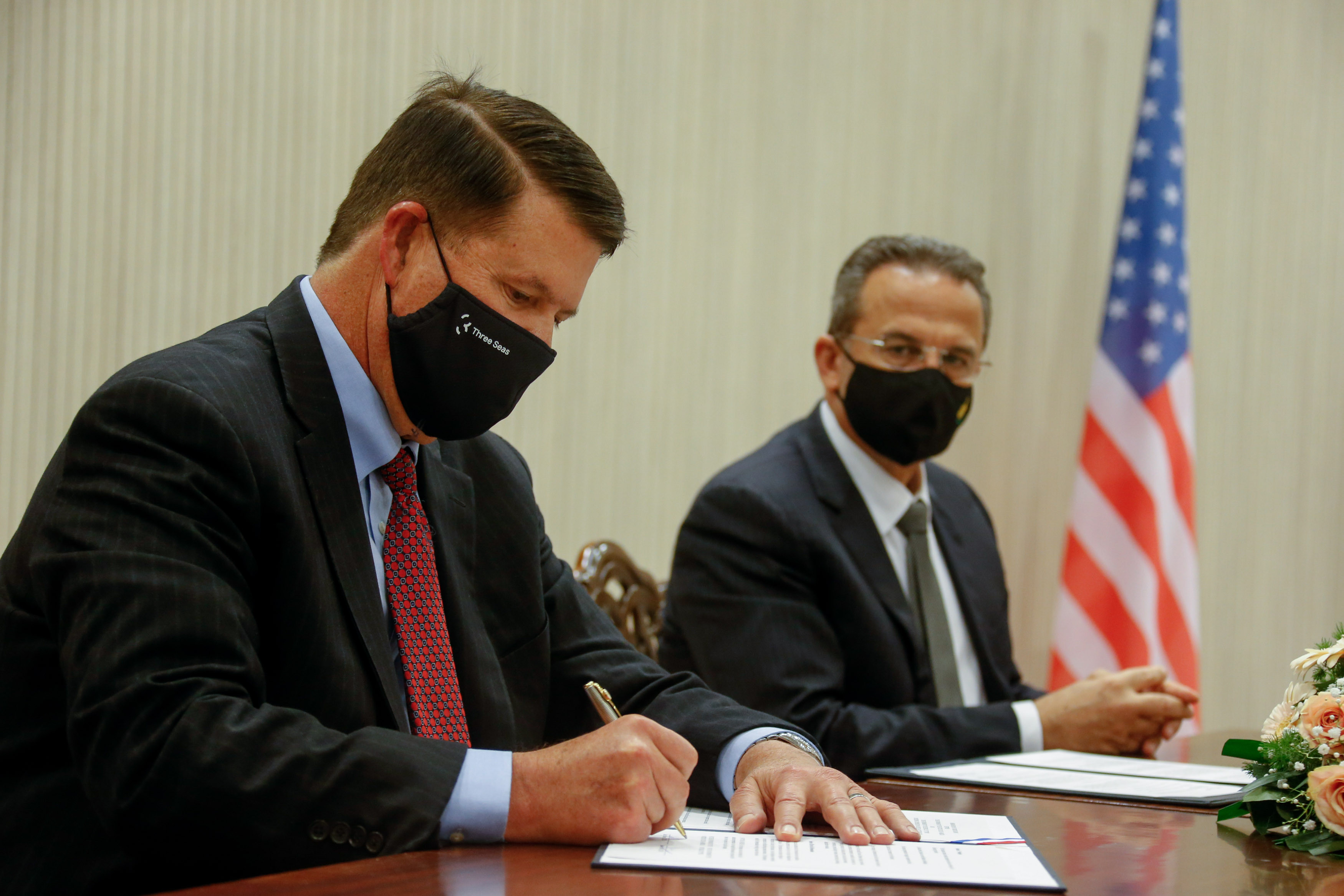
U.S. Undersecretary of State Keith Krach signs a memorandum of understanding regarding "Clean" technologies in Cyprus.

- Spain: Committed to implementing the EU 5G Clean Toolbox.
- Portugal: Committed to implementing the EU 5G Clean Toolbox.
- Slovakia: Committed to signing a Joint Declaration on 5G Security.
- Slovenia: Signed a Joint Declaration on 5G Security.
- Albania: Prime Minister Edi Rama stated, "Albania sees its role in the region not just as a constructive role in building peace and strengthening dialogue, but as a proactive role in the 5G Clean Path." In addition to Albania's commitment to 5G Clean Path, Under Secretary Krach and Albania's Finance Minister Anila Denaj signed a Memorandum of Economic Cooperation, laying the foundation to a memorandum of understanding on 5G security.
- Nauru joined in January 2021.

=== The Clean Network under the Biden administration ===
The Clean Network has received support from members of both major U.S. political parties. At the Munich Security Conference in February 2020, U.S. House Speaker Nancy Pelosi (D-CA) warned European countries they will "choose autocracy over democracy" if they let Huawei take part in rolling out 5G technology, in a sign of the bipartisan US political pressure over the Chinese company. She added it would be the "most insidious form of aggression" if 5G communications were to come under the control of an "anti-democratic government".

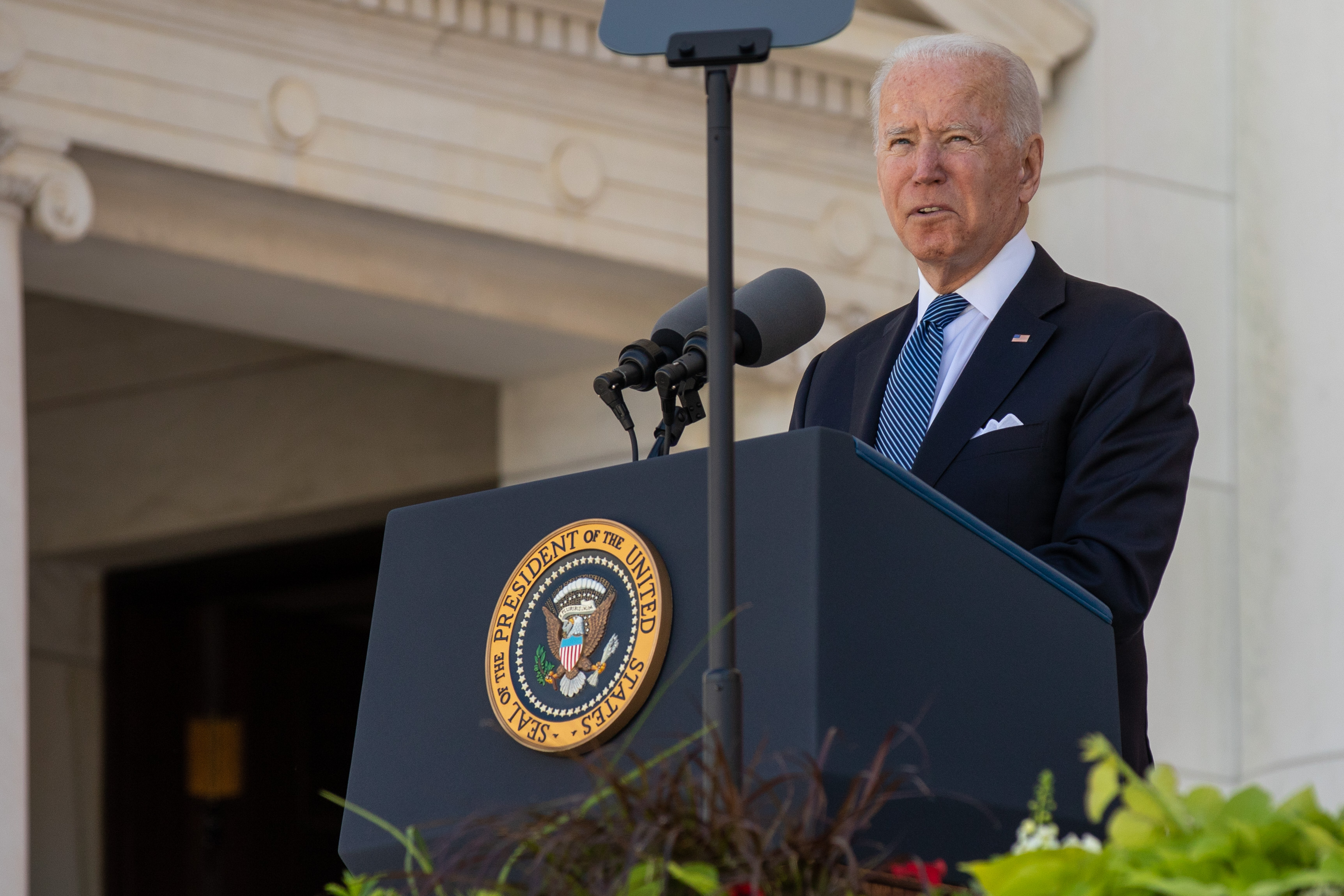
U.S. President Joe Biden speaking

According to the Wall Street Journal, U.S. President Joe Biden is expected to continue the Clean Network's ideals by continuing to "advance Washington’s tough, new attitude toward China but with an approach that relies more on pressure from U.S. allies, sanctions and other tools to shape Beijing’s behavior."

Another article predicted that Biden would limit China's influence by continuing to support the Clean Network plan of building alliances with allies, partners, and like-minded countries to promote values of human rights, democratic principles, and market economies. As of December 2020, Biden has not yet laid out his detailed China strategy, but Biden aides are expected to adopt the State Department's Clean Network and expand it to a broader set of commercial and strategic pacts to put pressure on Beijing.

According to Bloomberg, "there’s a good chance the Biden administration will pick up where Krach leaves off, assuming he isn’t asked to stay on."

In April 2022, Kurt Campbell, Biden's “Asia Chief” Head of Indo-Pacific Affairs at the U.S. National Security Council, stated, “Almost all the work that Keith Krach did at the State Department, including trusted networks, the Blue Dot Network, etc., have been followed on in the Biden Administration and, in many respects, that's the highest tribute.”

Biden's pick for Secretary of State, Antony Blinken, laid out his strategy for pushing back on China's various bad behaviors in a Hudson Institute event, where he promised to rally allies and put our values back at the center of our foreign policy toward. “When we’re working with allies and partners, it’s 50 or 60% of GDP. That’s a lot more weight and a lot harder for China to ignore. China sees alliances as a core source of strength for the United States, something they don’t share and enjoy.” The Clean Network includes 53 countries, representing 66% of the worlds GDP, on the Clean Network, plus 180 telcos on top of that.

=== The future of the Clean Network ===
According to the United States, The Clean Network is the first step in a vision of constructing a network of networks—like-minded countries, companies and civil society that operate by a set of trust principles for all areas of collaboration. It is an alliance of democracies with the goal of creating an equitable and unifying geo-economic network for multiple areas of collaboration.

Additional “clean initiatives” have been announced—Clean Path, Clean Carrier, Clean Store, Clean App, Clean Cable, and Clean Cloud. In his Senate testimony, Undersecretary of State Keith Krach shared his vision for the next wave that includes Clean Data Centers, Clean Currency, Clean Data, Clean Drones, Clean Security, and Clean Things (i.e., Internet of Things).

The Clean Network is a collection of networks that consists of multiple forms and lines of economic collaboration organized by sectors, regions, and industries. Forms of collaboration include commerce, investment, supply, chains, money flows, research, safeguarding assets, research, logistics, procurement, trade, policy, and standards. The lines of collaboration include sectors such as energy, healthcare, digital, agriculture, manufacturing, transportation, minerals, infrastructure, finance, space, and security.

The Clean Network team's strategy is based on the idea that the fastest way to construct a network is to build a “network of networks” as evidenced by integrating with the Clean EU 5G Cybersecurity Toolbox, collaborating on the Clean 5G NATO Network concept, and getting the recent endorsement by the Three Seas Initiative, a geo-economic network that comprises 12 Eastern European countries.

The Clean Network team's vision is to utilize Metcalfe's law for maximum network effect because as the number of members and areas of collaboration grows and the brand builds, the power of the Clean Network increases at an exponential rate. Krach has stated that the power of the Clean Network enables it to accomplish its noble democratic mission. The core principles enable fast, frictionless, and trusted collaboration critical to the members’ shared future.

According to the U.S. State Department, the next dimension of adjacent areas outside of tech have already begun—Clean Infrastructure and Clean Financing which is called the Blue Dot Network; Clean Minerals which is called the Energy Resource Governance initiative; and Clean Supply Chains with Clean Labor Practices. The Clean Network has the potential to be used as an umbrella network for existing regional initiatives like the Indo-Pacific Strategy, Three Seas Initiative, Transatlantic Partnership, EU-Asia Connectivity Initiative and American CRECE.

In April 2022, the White House announced that United States with 60 partners from around the globe launched the Declaration for the Future of the Internet.

== Reactions ==
Chinese foreign ministry spokesman Zhao Lijian referred to the Clean Network as a "US surveillance network" and "consolidation of US digital hegemony". Zhao stated that "In the era of globalization, 5G development should be jointly developed and shared by all countries. The practice of politicizing the 5G issue and creating small circles is not conducive to the development of 5G, goes against the principle of fair competition, and does not conform to the common interests of the international community."

Krach was nominated for the 2022 Nobel Peace Prize for his ‘Trust Principle’ doctrine in developing the Clean Network Alliance of Democracies. Conversely, Krach was among 28 former Trump administration officials sanctioned by the Chinese government on January 20, 2021, a move which the incoming Biden administration described as "unproductive and cynical."

A March 2021 GLOBSEC study noted the United States' effort to contain China in Europe has not been met with universal support in the region. Ukraine and Serbia both signed deals with Huawei despite American pressure, while Georgia, Armenia, and Azerbaijan all attempted to navigate a dedicate balance between geopolitical rivalries. Xuewen Gu of the University of Bonn's Center for Global Studies noted that the US did not make great headway in convincing its European allies that Huawei poses an uncontrollable security threat, with several of the countries listed in the Clean Network already broken their commitments to the initiative. Gu argued that this is due European leaders' suspicions of closed networks, such as China's own Great Firewall, and that the Clean Network would run in contrary to the spirit of an open, worldwide internet. Gu also noted European concerns that the Clean Network could potentially split the world's cyberspace in half, forcing European governments to take sides between China and the USA. Der Spiegel's Patrick Beuth referred to Mike Pompeo's announcement of the Clean Network as "noise" and "a pathetic document in contemporary history", and criticized Pompeo's characterization of Chinese networks as "unclean" and "spread viruses".

Andy Müller-Maguhn gave a statement in June 2021 at a hearing on "Innovative Technologies and Standardization in a Geopolitical Perspective" of the Committee for Foreign Affairs of the German federal parliament. In view of the Clean Network Initiative he made the connection from the NOBUS-Strategy to a renewed America First policy under Trump which continued with the lack of detachment from the policy by the Biden administration. The compartmentalization the network would work against the principle of net neutrality and towards the balkanization of the internet. The limiting of communication between parties would increase the likelihood of conflict and arouse in him associations with war preparations.

A number of countries and telecom providers listed in the Clean Network however did not formally ban cooperation with Huawei. The government of Japan for instance noted that it did not join US efforts to ban Huawei, but will undertake its own steps to address national security concerns. Vodafone in Spain utilizes Huawei in its 5G network alongside Ericsson, and in June 2020 the Spanish government granted Huawei a security clearance in working with Telefónica in building its core 5G network. While the three major telecommunications providers in Portugal - Vodafone, NOS, and Altice excluded Huawei equipment in their core 5G networks without stated reasons, the Portuguese government has not banned Huawei and noted that such decisions "has nothing to do with the options or impositions of the Portuguese government". Telefónica Germany announced that it would continue to cooperate with Huawei in its 4G and non-core 5G networks, alongside Ericsson with its 5G core networks. Netherlands' KPN announced that it had struck a deal with Huawei in building its non-core 5G network, as well as switching from Ericsson to Huawei in its 4G network, with the company noting that removing Huawei equipment would be costly and disruptive.

Following the end of US President Donald Trump's term in January 2021, the then President of Brazil and Trump ally, Jair Bolsonaro, reversed course and allowed Huawei to participate in Brazil's 5G auction due to opposition within the government and industry as well as mounting financial costs.

In June 2023, the European Union was contemplating the implementation of a mandatory ban on member countries engaging with companies that were identified as posing security threats within their 5G infrastructure, which included companies such as Huawei.
