= Indo-Mediterranean =

Indian Ocean-Mediterranean region

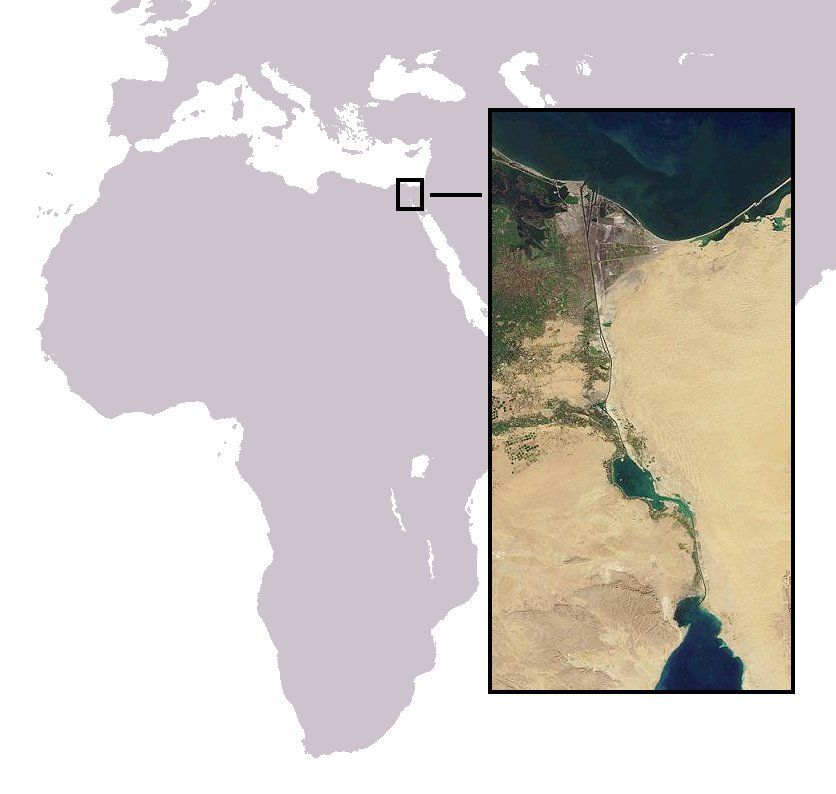
From 1869 onwards, the Suez Canal (depicted above) has offered a direct Indo-Mediterranean maritime route, and has become the main intermediate trade corridor in the region.

The Indo-Mediterranean is the region comprising the Mediterranean world, the Indian Ocean world, and their connecting regions in the vicinity of the Suez Canal.

== History ==
=== Prehistory ===
From around 3000 BCE to 1000 CE, connectivity within Afro-Eurasia was centered upon the Indo-Mediterranean region; William Dalrymple has argued that connectivity in Eurasia centered on this region along with the West Pacific, which put together he refers to as a "Golden Road", until 1200 CE and the rise of the Silk Road. Gamal Abdel Nasser, the second president of Egypt (which is at the heart of the Indo-Mediterranean) once described the country as "the crossroads of the world, the thoroughfare of its traders and passageway of its armies."

Caravan traffic through the extended arid zone at the heart of much of Afro-Eurasia played a significant role in allowing for Indian Ocean and Mediterranean ports to thrive and trade with each other. However, Southeast Asia was only loosely connected to the Indo-Mediterranean trade, primarily receiving a few Mediterranean objects through the filter of South Asia.

=== Ancient era ===
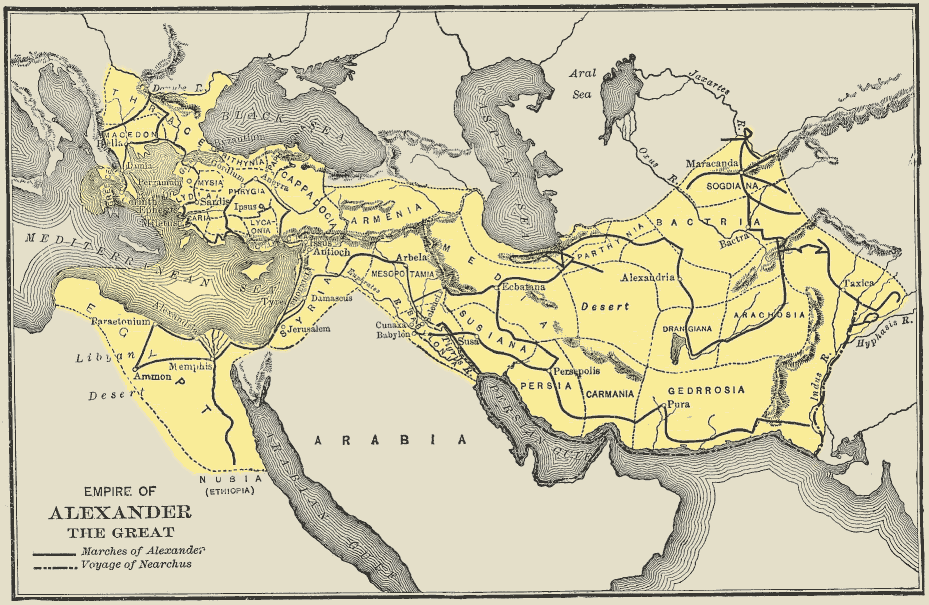
The Persian Achaemenid Empire and the succeeding Hellenistic Macedonian Empire

The Achaemenid Empire established dominance over territories throughout the Middle East by the fourth century BCE, creating new possibilities for interaction across Eurasia and its southern maritime spaces. It was then overtaken by Alexander the Great's eastward conquests in that century which resulted in an expansion of the Hellenistic world to northwest India; this helped link the Indian Ocean trade to the Eastern Mediterranean.

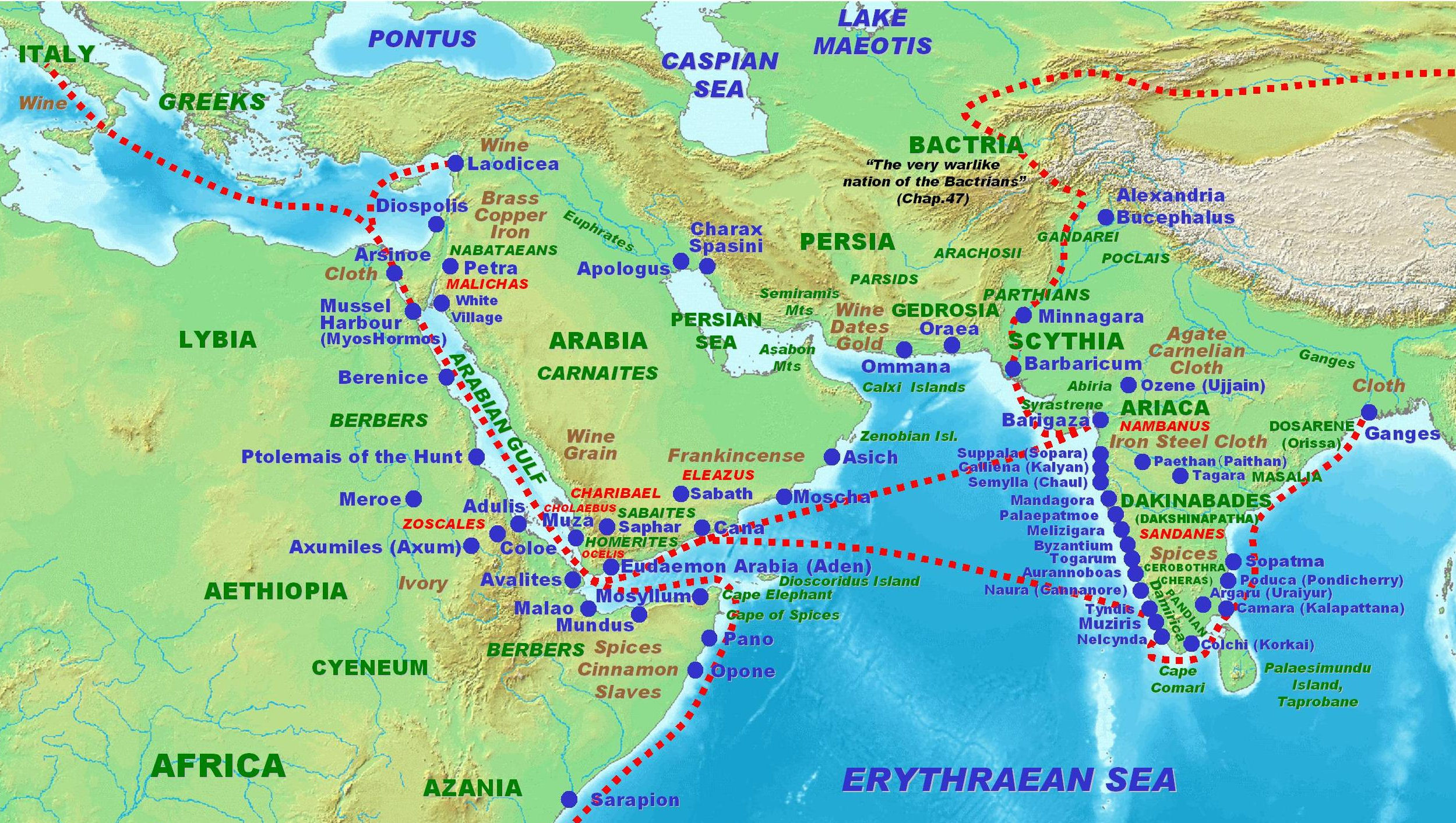
Roman trade in the Indian subcontinent according to the Periplus Maris Erythraei 1st century CE

In the second half of the first century BCE, the Roman Empire emerged with a unified realm and control over the Mediterranean, allowing for more investment and wealth generation; this Pax Romana allowed Rome to also become involved in the Indian Ocean trade. Their 30 BCE conquest of Egypt better positioned them to be involved in the region, with Indian ambassadors coming to Rome in increasing numbers as the Indo-Roman trade began to greatly expand in volume; Greek merchants settled on the west coast of India to facilitate the trade, with Romans celebrating the luxury products and wealth thusly acquired. This connectivity between Europe and the Indian Ocean reduced the importance of the Black Sea ports that the Greeks had helped establish in earlier centuries.

The Indo-Mediterranean also facilitated interactions between India and the Mesopotamians, Anatolians and Greeks in different time periods; many actors were involved in facilitating trade throughout this region, including Egyptians, Nabateans and Palmyrenes. The Abrahamic religions began to have a more significant presence in India in the early first millennium; Christian commercial networks and their potential for enabling religion to spread in the Indian Ocean were to foreshadow, but not successfully parallel the later rise of Islam.

Some evidence is present to suggest that Indo-Mediterranean trade may have also involved a "northern route" through the Caspian Sea and Pontic–Caspian steppe.

=== Medieval era ===
The expansion of the Caliphate in the Mediterranean region from 622 to 750 AD. Expansion under Muhammad, 622–632 Expansion during the Rashidun Caliphate, 632–661 Expansion during the Umayyad Caliphate, 661–750

The expansion of the first Arab Muslim empires from the 7th century onward, which conquered much of the Mediterranean, played a role in bridging the Indo-Mediterranean together. The Hajj pilgrimage, a fundamental element of Islam, also encouraged frequent convergence among Muslims who could make the maritime voyage toward Mecca. Islam's success in connecting land and maritime spaces throughout Afro-Eurasia, contrasting with certain anti-maritime attitudes such as kala pani that could be found in the Indian Ocean and Mediterranean from the pre-medieval era, can be seen in the 14th century voyages of the famous traveller Ibn Battuta.

By the 14th century, buoyed by the emergence of overlapping trading networks from the western regions of Africa to the east coast, central sub-Saharan Africa became more involved in Indo-Mediterranean trade, with the Indo-Mediterranean generally going on to become more economically unified by the spread of Islam.

=== Modern era ===
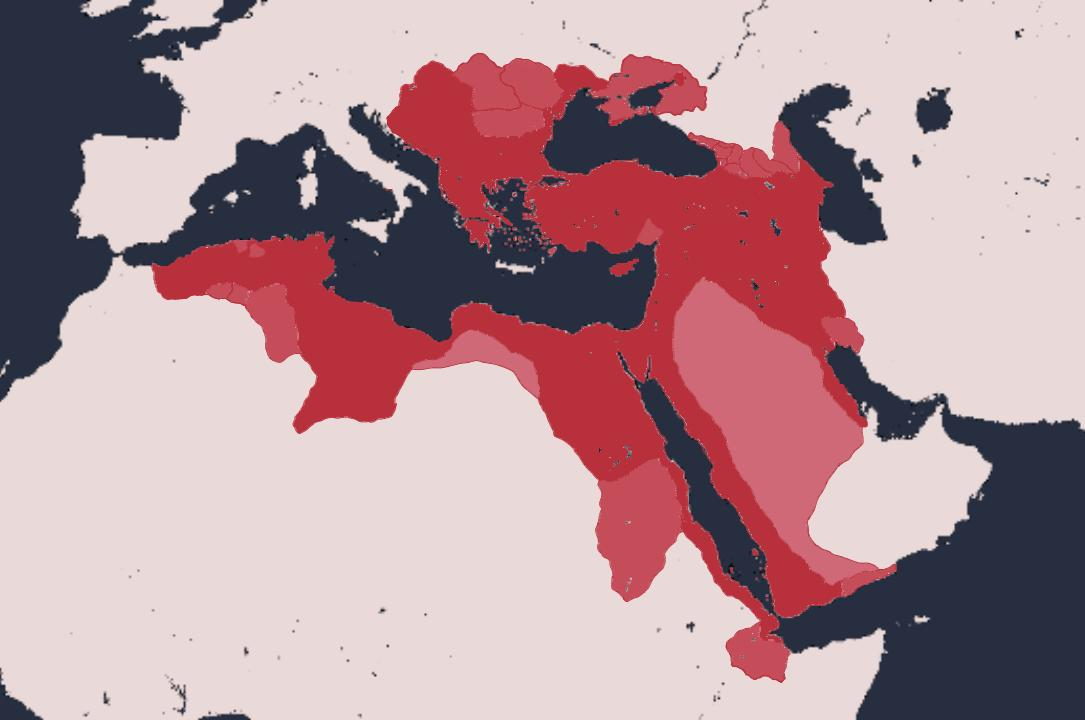
The Ottoman Empire at its territorial peak in 1590

The Portuguese created new ties between Europe and the Indian Ocean in the 1490s by discovering a route through the Indo-Atlantic that circumnavigated Africa. The new route gave Europe the opportunity for greater parity with the commercial dominance of Muslims in the Indian Ocean even as they were facing the threat of the expanding Ottoman Empire from the southeast; Ramachandra Byrappa has argued that the Ottomans may have intentionally destroyed an overland trade route between the Indian economic sphere and Europe seeking to make conquest easier around the Middle East, but that this inadvertently led to Western colonialism, as the Europeans grew in influence because of their success in discovering alternative routes into the world. Wang Gungwu has similarly pointed out that it was the medieval "stalemate" between the "Christian West and core Islamic lands" in the Mediterranean that led to Atlantic Europe's integration into the world. The resulting shifts in world dynamics saw the Indo-Mediterranean become less central until the 21st century.

For the Ottomans, their conquest of Constantinople in 1453 increased their reach in the Mediterranean, and in the next century, they also gained access to the western Indian Ocean by acquiring Egypt and Baghdad. This set the stage for the Ottoman–Portuguese confrontations. As for the Portuguese, their perception and persecution of Muslims as the primary enemy in the region fostered an anti-Portuguese sentiment among Indo-Mediterranean Muslims along with some calls for jihad. This formed part of a broader Ibero-Islamic conflict ranging from Europe to Maritime Southeast Asia, involving major developments such as the Iberian Reconquista. King Manuel I of Portugal even sought at the turn of the 16th century to strike at Jerusalem, the target of Crusades from Mediterranean Europe for centuries, from the Red Sea. In general, the Western European presence in the Indian Ocean was based on precedents formed in the Mediterranean by Venice and Genoa, bringing gun-based "trading-post empires" to a previously peaceful region (though contestation and piracy had been features of the region beforehand.) By the 17th and 18th centuries, various Western European forces were contesting the Persian Gulf, which had important, long-standing ties to trade in the Levant.

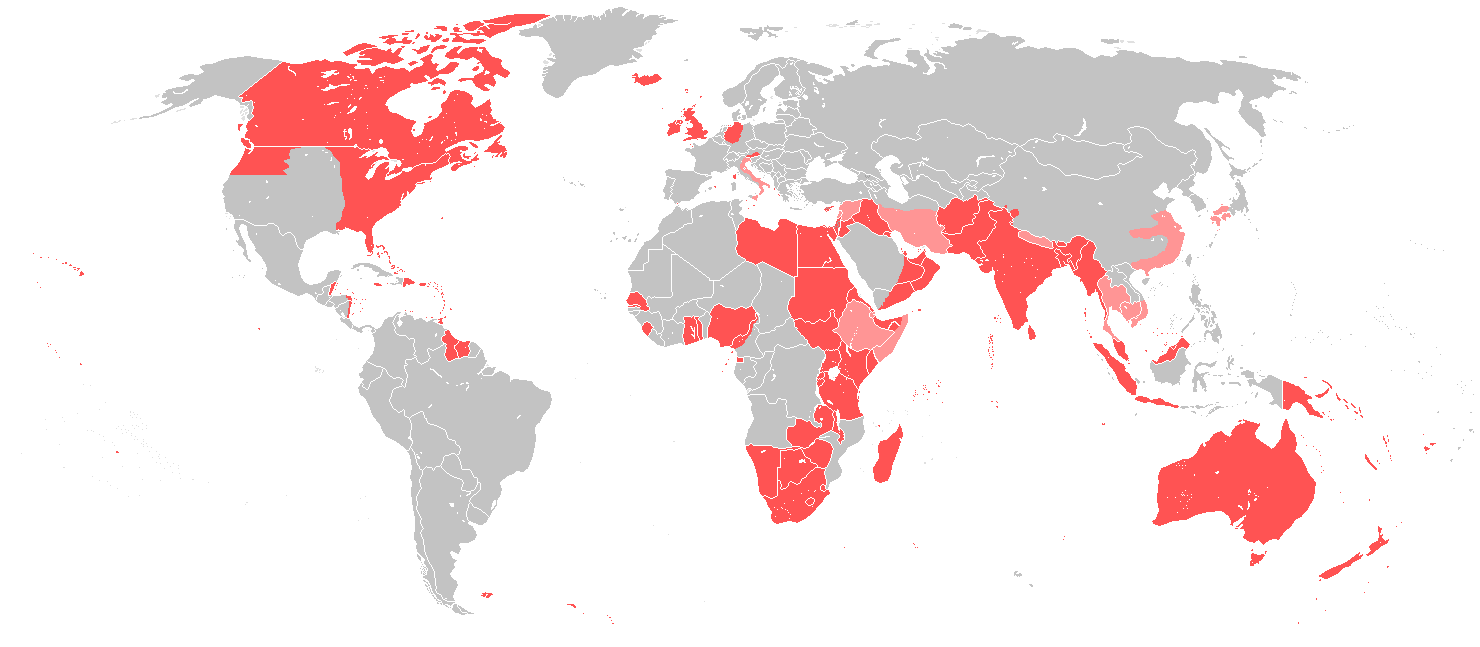
British imperial dominance was achieved by the mid-20th century in much of the Eastern Mediterranean and the Indian Ocean

Rising Western dominance and changes in communication technologies in the Indian Ocean and Mediterranean began to reshape local dynamics by the 19th century. After 1837, overland travel from Britain to British India was popularised; from 1840, steam ships were used to facilitate this travel on both sides of Egypt, and from the 1850s, railways were constructed along the route. The usefulness of this new route was shown during the Indian Rebellion of 1857, with 5,000 British troops having arrived through Egypt. The 1869 completion of the Suez Canal then helped to greatly expand European colonialism, as it enabled faster passage from Europe to Indian Ocean Afro-Asia. By the turn of the 20th century, British planners contemplated building an Indo-Mediterranean railway to shore up lines of communication with India in case the Suez Canal was blocked.

During World War II, British and American forces prevented Axis Italy from obtaining control of the Mediterranean and Middle East. (See also: Indian Ocean in World War II)

=== Contemporary era ===
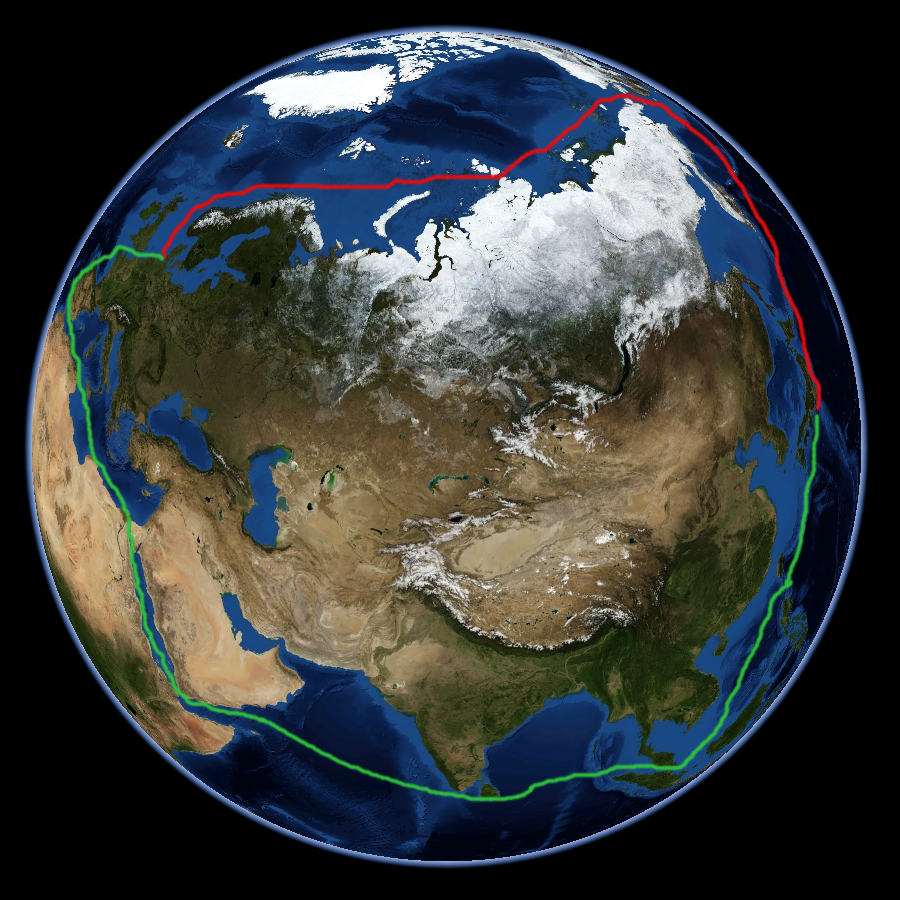
In some cases, 21st century Arctic shipping routes are almost half as long as Suez Canal routes

British dominance in the region was ended with the 1956 Suez Crisis, with the United States then going through a period of Cold War conflict with the Soviet Union before emerging as the new hegemon in the region. In the early 21st century, the U.S. has had to compete with China in the Indian Ocean, and so it has furthered its ties with India.

Italian foreign policy planners have recently been examining Italy's modern role in the "Enlarged Mediterranean", including its ties to the Indo-Mediterranean and the Indo-Pacific. They see the Red Sea as particularly important due its bridging role in the Indo-Mediterranean.

The 21st century melting of the Arctic is paving the way for new shipping routes between the Atlantic and the Pacific that are shorter than and may challenge the dominance of the conventional route through the Suez Canal. Geopolitical events also affect the relevance of the Indo-Mediterranean; for example, from December 2023 to mid-February 2024, Houthi attacks caused a 90% drop in Red Sea container traffic.

== Initiatives ==
=== India–Middle East–Europe Economic Corridor ===
The proposed India–Middle East–Europe Economic Corridor.

The India–Middle East–Europe Economic Corridor (IMEC) has been proposed to handle trade in the region. Indian External Affairs Minister S. Jaishankar affirmed the initiative in 2024, citing the historical importance and rising trade taking place in the region.

=== Indo-Mediterranean Initiative ===
The Indo-Mediterranean Initiative (IMI) was launched on the 16th of June 2024 at Ara Pacis under the leadership of Senator Giulio Terzi di Sant'Agata, former foreign Minister of Italy hosted by the Indian Chamber of Commerce's Chief Representative for Italy, Vas Shenoy. The initiative aims to track IMEC, bring together decision makers, thinkers, policy experts in the IMEC countries to discuss the security, future and strategy of the Indo-Mediterranean.

== List of Indo-Mediterranean countries ==
This is a list of countries that are part of the Indo-Mediterranean, since they lie along the Indian Ocean or the Mediterranean, or both. It is arranged from north to south, west to east in directional order.

- Southern Europe
  - Portugal
  - Spain
  - France
  - Italy
  - Malta
  - Slovenia
  - Croatia
  - Bosnia and Herzegovina
  - Montenegro
  - Albania
  - Greece
  - Turkey
  - Cyprus
- North Africa
  - Morocco
  - Algeria
  - Tunisia
  - Libya
  - Egypt
- Sub-Saharan Africa
  - Sudan
  - Eritrea
  - Djibouti
  - Somalia
  - Kenya
  - Tanzania
  - Mozambique
  - South Africa
  - Madagascar
  - Comoros
  - Mauritius
  - Seychelles
- West Asia
  - Syria
  - Lebanon
  - Israel
  - Palestine
  - Jordan
  - Saudi Arabia
  - Yemen
  - Oman
  - United Arab Emirates
  - Qatar
  - Bahrain
  - Kuwait
  - Iraq
  - Iran
- South Asia
  - Pakistan
  - India
  - Maldives
  - Sri Lanka
  - Bangladesh
- Southeast Asia
  - Myanmar
  - Thailand
  - Malaysia
  - Indonesia
- Oceania
  - Australia

== See also ==
- Northeast Africa
  - Berenice Troglodytica, a historical Egyptian port serving Indo-Mediterranean trade
- Global Southeast
- Southern Sea Route
