= The Once and Future World Order =

2025 nonfiction book by Amitav Acharya

The Once and Future World Order: Why Global Civilization Will Survive the Decline of the West is a 2025 book by international relations scholar Amitav Acharya published by Basic Books in April 2025. The book explores the historical development of world order across different civilizations and regions, beginning with ancient Sumer and Egypt and extending through Persia, Greece, India, China, Rome, the Islamic world, Africa, the Americas, and Europe to the contemporary international system. The book examines the development of political ideas, institutions, and practices associated with relations among states and societies, including diplomacy, trade, political organization, war, and interstate cooperation, and concludes with a discussion of the changing international order and the implications of declining Western dominance.

== Contents ==
The book traces the development of different world orders and interactions among societies throughout history, before turning to the contemporary international system and its possible future.

The book starts by examining the different ideas and institutions commonly associated with the "Western" world order emerged in non-Western civilizations thousands of years before the rise of the West. These range from peace treaties and interstate cooperation to freedom of the seas and environmental protection. Acharya argues that these contributions have often been overlooked in the mainstream history.

The book examines how the dominance of the European perspective over the last 500 years has contributed to two forms of historical misrepresentation: the sin of commission and the sin of omission. The sin of commission is largely the misinterpretation or distortion of the achievements of non-Western cultures and civilizations. The sin of omission occurs when facts about them are overlooked. The book also considers the achievements and failures of both Western and non-Western civilizations.

The book also explores three fears in the West today about the end of the American-led Western order: the fear of the rise of the "civilization states," the fear of the Chinese-built and Chinese-led order, and the fear of "chaos, violence, and conflict."

== Reception ==
Writing in The New York Times, historian Abhishek Kaicker reviewed the book together with historian William Dalrymple’s The Golden Road. He discussed the two works as attempts to reconsider conventional accounts of how the international order developed. In The Christian Science Monitor, it appeared on the 10 best books of April 2025 and Abhijnan Rej examined Acharya’s claim that the principles and institutions of political order arose across several civilizations rather than exclusively in the modern West.

The book was included in Foreign Policy’s The Most Anticipated Books of 2025.

Academic reviews include International Studies Review and Commonwealth & Comparative Politics
