= Olivia Fraser =

Olivia Fraser may refer to:

- Olivia Fraser Richards, a fictional character from the Australian television soap opera Home and Away
- Olivia Fraser (artist), Scottish artist
