= The Anarchy: The Relentless Rise of the East India Company =

2019 book by William Dalrymple

- First edition cover, UK
- Author: William Dalrymple
- Language: English
- Genre: Non-fiction
- Publisher: Bloomsbury Publishing
- Publication date: 2019
- Publication place: United Kingdom
- Pages: 576
- ISBN: 9781408864371 (Hardback)
- OCLC: 1076511649
- Dewey Decimal: 954.031
- LC Class: DS465 .D35
- Preceded by: Koh-i-Noor: The History of the World's Most Infamous Diamond
- Website: https://www.bloomsbury.com/uk/anarchy-9781408864395/

The Anarchy: The Relentless Rise of the East India Company (Note: Published as The Anarchy: The East India Company, Corporate Violence, and the Pillage of an Empire in the United States.) is a 2019 history book by William Dalrymple. It recounts the rise of the East India Company in the second half of the 18th century, against the backdrop of a crumbling Mughal Empire and the rise of regional powers.

== Overview ==
The book deals with the history of the East India Company in the Indian subcontinent, beginning with the humble origins of the East India Company, founded in 1599 when it received a royal charter awarding them a monopoly on all trade between England and Asia. By the end of the first half of the 18th century, they had established bases in Bombay, Calcutta and Madras. The main part of the book deals with the territorial conquests, starting from the Battle of Plassey in 1757, which results in the conquest of Bengal, the richest province of Mughal India. By the end of 1803, they have gained control over the entire subcontinent and command a large private army.

Dalrymple draws from known sources and previously untranslated or unknown sources like the Shah Alam Nama, a biography of Shah Alam II, the Mughal emperor during most of the events, as well as the biography of Louis Laurent de Féderbe, a French military officer among the earliest chroniclers of European involvement in India.

== Reception ==
Maya Jasanoff of The Guardian notes that the book is an "... energetic pageturner that marches from the counting house on to the battlefield, exploding patriotic myths along the way." Tirthankar Roy writes in The Times Literary Supplement that "...he is a terrifically good storyteller. He makes the reader see how events unfold and observe the personalities up close. He is widely read both on the primary sources and the historical scholarship. As a result, The Anarchy is one of the best books on Indian history published in a long time."

M Saad of Scroll notes that "[i]t is an achievement in itself that he has adroitly dealt with a work of such proportions. Dalrymple writes with a mastery in which he has few equals among his contemporaries. He is known for narrating the most dreadful of all historical events with a certain grace unique to his writing." Mukund Padmanabhan writes in The Hindu that "[i]n his familiar passionate manner, Dalrymple cuts through the stodge that pervades a lot of writing on history to serve up a book that has it all — the compulsive pull of a thriller, the erudition of a significant piece of non-fiction, and the loveliness of a piece of literature." Madhumita Mazumdar writes in The Telegraph that "[t]he Anarchy remains a unique meditation on corporate avarice told with the deftness of a scholar and the charm of a raconteur."

The book was long listed for the Baillie Gifford Prize 2019, and short listed for the Duke of Wellington medal for Military History, the Tata Book of the Year (Non-fiction) and the Historical Writers Association Book Award 2020. It was a finalist for the Cundill History Prize and won the 2020 Arthur Ross Bronze Medal from the US Council on Foreign Relation.

President Barack Obama included The Anarchy in his list of favorite books of 2019.

== TV Adaptation ==
The Anarchy is planned to be adapted by Jeremy Brock. Three TV series are envisaged, with Dalrymple acting as a creative consultant. It is intended as an international production between Wiip and Roy Kapur Films, produced across India, United Kingdom and the United States.
