= From the Holy Mountain =

1997 book by William Dalrymple

- Author: William Dalrymple
- Language: English
- Subject: Travel
- Genre: Non-fiction
- Publisher: HarperCollins
- Publication date: 1997
- Publication place: United Kingdom
- Media type: Print
- Pages: xvi, 483
- ISBN: 978-0143031086
- OCLC: 37928466
- Preceded by: City of Djinns
- Followed by: The Age of Kali

From the Holy Mountain is a 1997 historical travel book by William Dalrymple that deals with the affairs of the Eastern Christians.

== Overview ==
Dalrymple's third book, From the Holy Mountain: A Journey in the Shadow of Byzantium (1997) saw him trace the ties of Eastern Orthodox congregations scattered in the Middle East to their ancient origins; it also deals with the question of how they have fared over centuries of Islamic rule and the complex relationship of Islam, Judaism, and Christianity in the Middle East.

In his first book In Xanadu Dalrymple had followed the route taken by Marco Polo from Jerusalem to Mongolia. In this book he follows the route taken by sixth-century monk John Moschos who traveled through the eastern Byzantine world, culminating at Constantinople, where Moschos wrote his book, the Spiritual Meadow. A large part of the book covers the lives of the final remaining Christian communities in Asia Minor, the Levant and Egypt as they are driven away from the region by civil war and factional violence.

Dalrymple's journey in the footsteps of Moschos starts from Mount Athos, Greece, at the end of June 1994, proceeds to Istanbul, and thence to eastern Turkey. Here he crosses the border and enters Syria. The next stop is Lebanon which is just at the end of its civil war, after which he crosses into Israel, the West Bank in December and concludes his trip in December in Egypt at the monastery of Deir ul-Muharraq which had just been attacked by the Gemaat al-Islamiyya.

== Reception ==
Ted Conover of The New York Times wrote "Dalrymple, a decidedly learned sort who allows that at Cambridge I spent my final year specializing in the study of Hiberno-Saxon art," has a zeal for ecclesiastical arcana that occasionally blinds him to the limits of what might interest the general reader. ("Scholars believe that work produced in the Tur Abdin may well once have provided the inspiration for the very first figurative Christian art in Britain," he enthuses.) But this passion is leavened by his dark sense of humor and talent as a journalist.
