= Project Dastaan =

Peace-building initiative

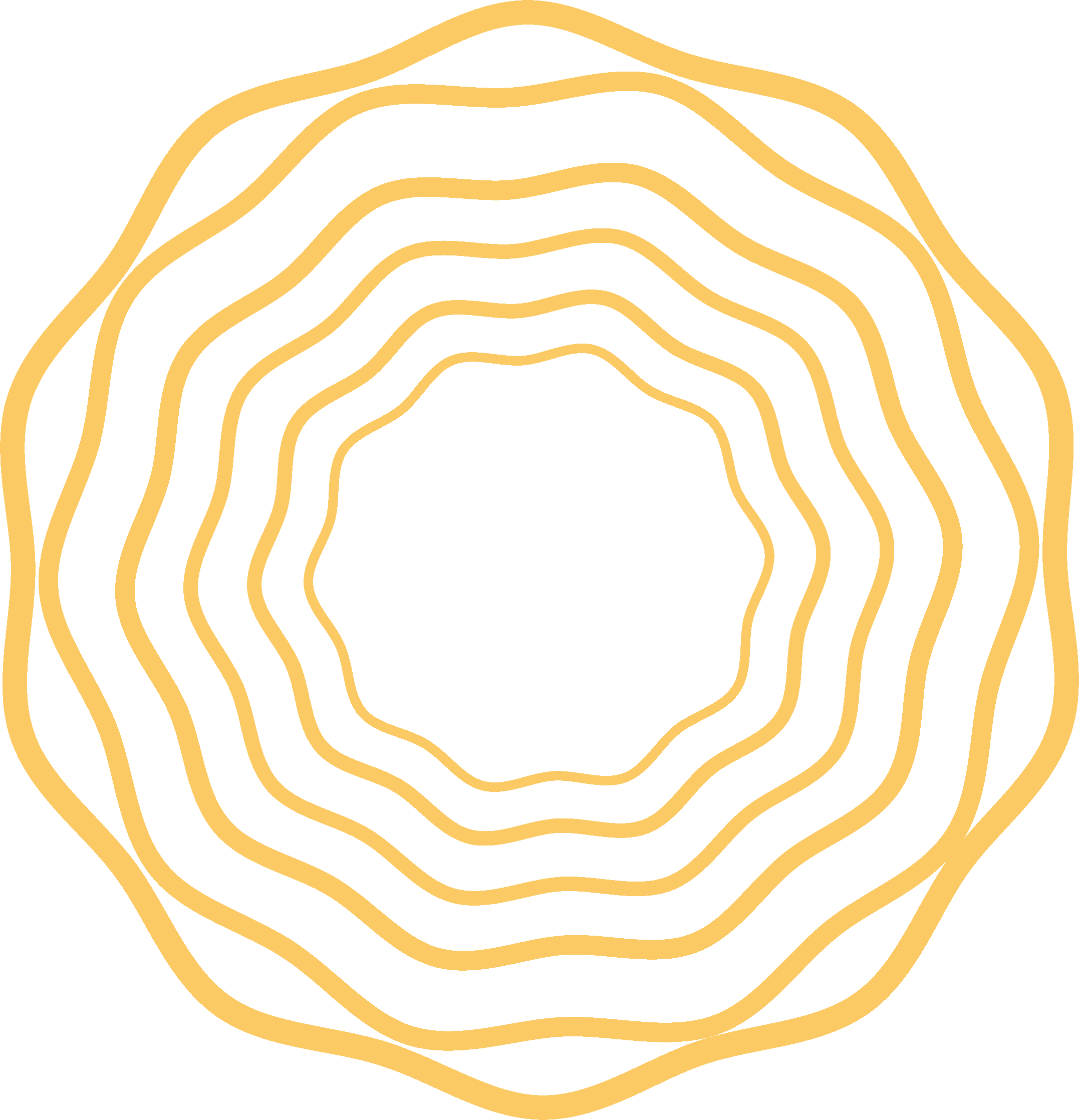
- Founded: 2018
- Purpose: Peacebuilding
- Key people: Sparsh Ahuja, Sam Dalrymple, Saadia Gardezi
- Website: www.projectdastaan.org

Project Dastaan is a peace-building initiative that reconnects displaced refugees of the 1947 Partition of India that created the modern-day South Asian republics of India, Pakistan and Bangladesh with their childhood communities and villages through bespoke 360-degree digital experiences. Dastaan means 'story' in several languages of the subcontinent.

The project aimed to virtually reconnect 75 first-hand witnesses of the Partition to their ancestral homes by 2022; however, COVID-19 restrictions reduced this target to 30 virtual returns. The Project has 3 features Child of Empire, an interactive VR piece to be installed in museums, a feature film titled The Lost Migration and another film titled Where the Birds Live.

Founded in 2018 by a group of four students at the University of Oxford, the venture is advised by high-profile historians, film-makers and advocates including Malala Yousafzai, Gabo Arora, Suroosh Alvi, William Dalrymple and Aanchal Malhotra.

Dastaan's founding director, Sparsh Ahuja, was a recipient of the San-Francisco based CatchLight Fellowship in 2018 in order to seed fund the project. The Project was also accepted onto Kaleidoscope VR's DevLab Accelerator in 2020 and is part of the UK-based National Partition Commemoration Project, which launched the 'South Asian Heritage Month' Campaign at British Parliament in 2018. In 2022, co-founder Saadia Gardezi was awarded a National Lottery Project Grant by Arts Council England to fund a multi-venue tour across the UK in commemoration of the 75th anniversary of partition.
