= Saadia Gardezi =

Pakistani journalist, artist and peace activist

- Education: University of Oxford (M.Phil.)
- Occupations: Journalist, artist and peace activist
- Known for: Project Dastaan

Saadia Gardezi is a Pakistani peace activist, artist and journalist. She co-founded Project Dastaan.

== Early life and education ==
Gardezi grew up in Lahore, Pakistan. She completed an M.Phil. degree from University of Oxford as a Weidenfeld-Hoffmann Scholar. She has a Ph.D. in international relations from the University of Warwick.

== Career ==
Gardezi co-founded Project Dastaan with Sparsh Ahuja and Sam Dalrymple. The project is a peace initiative that reunites refugees displaced by the Partition of India of 1947 with their ancestral homes.

Gardezi has worked as a political cartoonist for The Nation in Pakistan. She has worked as a journalist for several media outlets.

Gardezi is an artist and runs an art studio called Penguin Pop.

Gardezi produced Child of Empire, an animated film based on the partition of 1947. It premiered at the Sundance Film Festival in 2022.
