= Sparsh Ahuja =

Indian-Australian documentary filmmaker

- Born: India
- Education: University of Oxford (B.A.)
- Occupations: Peace activist and documentary filmmaker
- Known for: Project Dastaan

Sparsh Ahuja is an Indian-Australian peace activist and documentary filmmaker. He founded Project Dastaan along with Sam Dalrymple and Saadia Gardezi.

== Early life and education ==
Ahuja was born in India and grew up in Australia. He graduated from University of Oxford with a Bachelor of Arts (B.A.) degree in philosophy, politics and economics as a Fitz Randolph Scholar.

== Career ==
Ahuja founded Project Dastaan which is a peace initiative aimed at reintegrating refugees displaced by the Partition of India of 1947 with their ancestral homes.

Ahuja is the director of Child of Empire, a VR docu-drama based on the 1947 partition. It premiered at the 2022 Sundance Film Festival.

Ahuja directed a documentary titled Birdsong: the dying whistled language of the Hmong people in northern Laos in 2023. It was awarded a special mention at Palm Springs International ShortFest and was shortlisted by International Documentary Association for the 39th IDA Documentary Awards. The documentary was shortlisted for a Grierson Award, and later acquired by The Guardian.

Ahuja is an explorer with National Geographic.
