= The Age of Kali =

Book by William Dalrymple

- Author: William Dalrymple
- Language: English
- Subject: Travel
- Genre: Non-fiction
- Publisher: Penguin Books
- Publication date: 1998
- Publication place: United Kingdom
- Pages: 400 pp.
- ISBN: 978-0307948908
- OCLC: 1336313297
- Preceded by: From the Holy Mountain
- Followed by: White Mughals

The Age of Kali is a 1998 travel book by William Dalrymple. The book's theme is trouble in the Indian subcontinent and the Hindu belief in a time called the Kali Yuga when many problems will come to exist in the world.

The book gives an overview of many of the top controversies in the region at the time of publication, including interviews with players in those events.

== Publication ==
Dalrymple's fourth book, The Age of Kali (1998), saw the author rekindle his love affair with India. It was released in India renamed as At the Court of the Fish-Eyed Goddess (ISBN 8172233329). (The "fish eyed goddess" refers to the Goddess Meenakshi of Madurai.)

== Synopsis by chapter ==
The book is a collection of essays collected through almost a decade of travel around the Indian subcontinent.

It deals with many controversial subjects such as Sati, the caste wars in India, political corruption and terrorism.

=== The Age of Kali: Patna, 1998 ===
This chapter on Patna includes discussions of the 13 February 1992 massacre of high caste people by low caste people in Barra, Bihar; the arrest and political style of Anand Mohan Singh; violence in Patna; and a profile of and interview with Laloo Prasad Yadav.

=== In the Kingdom of Avadh: Lucknow, 1998 ===
This chapter includes a discussion of the culture of 19th-century Lucknow; the general decline of Lucknow; the poet Mir Taqi Mir; the palace Dilkusha; and the Tawaif (courtesan) subculture. Interviews with Mushtaq Naqvi, an elderly poet, profound author and a historian and Suleiman Mahmudabad, a literati prince, lead the narrative.

=== The City of Widows: Vrindavan, Uttar Pradesh, 1997 ===
This chapter on Vrindavan discusses the lives of widows who retire there and corruption in the systems for providing aid to widows.

=== Warrior Queen: Gwalior, 1993 ===
This chapter on Gwalior includes an interview with Vijayaraje Scindia co founder of Bharatiya Janata Party and discussions of Jai Vilas palace and the Babri Mosque.

=== East of Eton: Lucknow, 1997 ===
This chapter includes a description of the 1997 murder of an instructor in Lucknow's La Martiniere College. It goes on to describe the colonial influence in Indian education and gives some anecdotes about the University of Lucknow's student union organizing protection rackets.

=== The sad tale of Bahveri Devi: Batteri, Jaipur, 1994 ===
The chapter includes an interview with Bhanwari Devi, the social worker charged by the government to report child marriage in her area, and who was gang raped in retaliation. It also includes interviews with politically motivated people who say that she was not raped.

=== Caste wars: Jodhpur, Rajasthan, 1990 ===
The chapter gives the story of the Brahmin student Rajiv Goswami's self-immolation in response to V. P. Singh's 1990 implementation of the Mandal Commission recommendations for making reservations for Other Backward Castes (OBCs) and further discusses caste politics in general.

=== Sati Mata: Deorala, Jaipur, 1997 ===
The chapter talks about Roop Kanwar, the 18-year-old female who died in 1987 during sati on her dead husband's funeral pyre. The author interviews people in Deorala and gives an overview of the 19th century history of the practice of sati.

=== Two Bombay Portraits: Bombay 1993 and 1992 ===
This chapter has two parts. The first part discusses the work of Indian rapper Baba Sehgal. It also describes India's music industry and discusses Remo Fernandes, STAR TV network, the success of the soundtrack to the movie Saajan.

The second part discusses sexuality in the Indian media and contains an interview of Shobhaa De, the author who writes erotica novels wherein female characters seek sexual encounters in Mumbai. It also reviews the Mumbai high-society party scene.

=== Bangalore and the Fast-Food Invaders: Bangalore, 1997 ===
The theme of this chapter is the intervention of globalization into the lives of poor people in India. It starts with an anecdote about 200 farmers from rural Bangalore ransacking a Kentucky Fried Chicken restaurant in the city on account of it being non-Indian and for serving meat. Other topics discussed include Cargill's India presence, modern culture of the rich in Bangalore, foreign trade, and the controversy about Bangalore's hosting Miss World 1996. The author interviews Professor M. D. Nanjundaswamy, president of the Karnataka State Farmer's Association, about globalization.

=== At the Court of the Fish-eyed Goddess: Madurai 1998 ===
Minakshi is the Fish-eyed Goddess worshipped in Madurai and this chapter discusses the history of the politics of the region and how in modern times educated people became more respectful of the faith. The chapter also discusses a 300BCE document called Periplus of the Erythraean Sea, the epic poem Silappatikaram, and the Meenakshi Amman Temple.

=== Under the Char Minar: Hyderabad, 1998 ===
The chapter is guided by an interview with Mir Moazam Husain, grandson of Fakrool Mulk, who was Deputy Prime Minister of the Nizam's last government in Hyderabad and a building enthusiast. Mir Husain recounts Operation Polo and also talks about present-day local black magic practices. The author compares the old State of Hyderabad to Ruritania.

=== Parashakti: Cochin, 1993 ===
Venugopal, a retired engineer of the Kerala State Electricity Board, takes the author on a tour of Chottanikkara where they discuss the motives of people's worship of Parashakti.

=== At Donna Georgina's: Fort Aguada, Goa, 1993 ===
The chapter gives an introduction to Portuguese colonization in Goa as he interviews an elderly Goan aristocratic woman named Donna Georgina. Donna Georgina discusses two invasions of Goa - the 1961 Indian annexation of Goa and the migration of Western hippies as tourists to their beaches.

=== Up the Tiger Path: Jaffna, Sri Lanka, 1990 ===
The author goes to Jaffna and interviews members of the Liberation Tigers of Tamil Eelam. Particular focus is given to the female contingent, the Freedom Birds, the youth, the rank systems, and their military camps. The author interviews Anton Balasingham and other LTTE members at a time when the Indian Peace Keeping Force is leaving Sri Lanka.

=== The Sorcerer's Grave: Saint-Denis, Réunion, 1998 ===
The chapter gives the story of Olivier Levasseur and the people's local belief in the spiritual power associated with his grave. The author writes on the Frenchness of Réunion and its mix with Indian culture. A story of Saint Expeditus is given.

=== Imran Khan - Out for a Duck: Lahore, 1989 and 1996 ===
There are two parts in this chapter and each one contains an interview of Imran Khan. The first one in 1989 is when Khan is a star player on the Pakistan national cricket team and the second is when Khan founds the political party Pakistan Tehreek-e-Insaf.

=== On the Frontier: Peshawar, 1989 ===
The author visits the Northwest Frontier, known today as the Khyber Pakhtunkhwa, and interviews a proprietor of a military supplies shop which then sold AK-47s to tribesmen but previously supplied participants in the Afghan civil war and other military actions. He visits Kohtal and surveys the opium trade there. He gives the history of the Greek ruins in Gandhara where Alexander the Great lived in the area 2300 years prior.

=== Blood on the Tracks: Lahore, 1997 ===
The author talks with a retired Pakistan Railways employee about his experience during the Partition of India. Further discussion about the Partition follows.

=== Benazir Bhutto - Mills & Boon in Karachi: Karachi, 1994 ===
The author interviews Benazir Bhutto and Nusrat Bhutto at her separate homes. He gives a description of their homes and recounts parts of their biographies. Mills & Boon refers to a series of romance novels which Benazir Bhutto enjoyed.

== Reviews ==
In reviewing this book Robert Twigger said that "Dalrymple has become a kind of Uberjournalist who has superseded Mark Tully as the voice of India and this book collects 19 essays on places and people located on or near the Indian subcontinent."
