= Sam Dalrymple (historian) =

British historian (born 1997)

- Born: February 1997 (age 29)
- Education: University of Oxford
- Occupations: Historian, author, film-maker, peace activist, social media influencer
- Notable work: Shattered Lands
- Movement: Project Dastaan
- Parents: William Dalrymple (father); Olivia Fraser (mother)

Samuel Hew Tantallon Dalrymple (born February 1997) is a Scottish historian, author, film-maker, activist, and social media influencer.

== Early life and education ==
Dalrymple was born to public historian William Dalrymple and artist Olivia Fraser. His paternal grandfather was Sir Hew Hamilton-Dalrymple, 10th Baronet of North Berwick, and his paternal grandmother was a daughter of Walter Keppel, 9th Earl of Albemarle. His father is a great nephew of Virginia Woolf and a cousin of writer Alice Albinia.

Dalrymple graduated as a Sanskrit and Persian scholar from the University of Oxford.

== Career ==
Dalrymple along with Sparsh Ahuja and Saadia Gardezi founded Project Dastaan, a peace-building initiative that reconnects refugees displaced by the partition of India.

Dalrymple's first film, Child of Empire, was a VR docudrama detailing the horrors of forced migration and premiered at the Sundance Film Festival in 2022. His animated anthology "Lost Migrations" was a sell-out at the British Film Institute.

Dalrymple's book, Shattered Lands: Five Partitions and the Making of Modern Asia, was published in 2025 by HarperCollins. It has been received positively and was a Best Book of the Year in the Financial Times, NPR, The Spectator, The Week, BBC History Magazine, and History Today. It was later shortlisted for the 2026 Cundill History Prize, the 2026 Orwell Prize for Political Writing, the Eastern Eye Award for History, the Ramnath Goenka Sahithya Samman, and the Atta Galatta Book Prize 2025.

Dalrymple also writes on art and architectural history, and received the "Champion of Travel Narrative" award from Travel + Leisure in 2024. He served as a columnist at Architectural Digest India, and publishes the history Substack Travels of Samwise. In 2026, he guest-edited an issue of the art history journal MARG titled Beyond the Mughal Arch: Temples in Early Modern India, which examined temple construction and destruction within the Mughal Empire.
