= City of Djinns =

1993 travelogue by William Dalrymple

- Author: William Dalrymple
- Illustrator: Olivia Fraser
- Language: English
- Subject: Travel
- Genre: Non-fiction
- Publisher: Penguin Books
- Publication date: 1993
- Publication place: United Kingdom
- Media type: Print
- Pages: 320 pp. (hardcover)
- ISBN: 978-0002157254
- OCLC: 52074083
- Preceded by: In Xanadu
- Followed by: From the Holy Mountain

City of Djinns: A Year in Delhi (1993) is a travelogue by British historian William Dalrymple about the historical capital of India, Delhi. It is his second book, and culminated as a result of his six-year stay in New Delhi.

The City of Djinns is one of the first books by William Dalrymple that does not revolve around the history of India; rather, it represents various anecdotes of his time in India and explores the history of India with the help of various characters he meets, like the Puri family, the driver, the customs officer, and British survivors of the Raj, as well as whirling dervishes and eunuch dancers (‘a strange mix of piety and bawdiness’). Dalrymple describes ancient ruins and the experience of living in the capital of modern India: he goes in search of the history behind the epic stories of the Mahabharata. Nonetheless, more solemnly, he finds evidence of the city’s violent past and present day, to wit, the 1857 mutiny against British rule, the Partition massacres in 1947, and the riots following the assassination of Indira Gandhi in 1984.

The book followed his established style of historical digressions, tied in with contemporary events and a multitude of anecdotes.

== Adaptations ==
The book was adapted into a play in 2007 by Rahul Dasinnur Pulkeshi of the Delhi-based Dreamtheatre. Dalrymple's character was essayed by Bollywood and stage actor Tom Alter, with Zohra Sehgal donning the role of Nora Nicholson, a British national who prefers to stay in India after it achieves independence.

== Awards ==
- Thomas Cook Travel Book Award (1994)
- Sunday Times Young Writer of the Year Award (1994)

== Citation ==
- Dalrymple, William (1994). City of Djinns: A Year in Delhi. Flamingo. ISBN 0-00-637595-2
