= Koh-i-Noor: The History of the World's Most Infamous Diamond =

2017 book by William Dalrymple and Anita Anand

- Hardcover edition
- Author: William Dalrymple and Anita Anand
- Subject: Koh-i-Noor
- Publisher: Bloomsbury Publishing
- Publication date: 2017
- Publication place: United Kingdom
- Media type: Print (hardcover and paperback)
- Pages: 336
- ISBN: 978-1408888841 (hardcover)
- OCLC: 995630420

Koh-i-Noor: The History of the World's Most Infamous Diamond is a 2017 book on the Koh-i-Noor diamond written by William Dalrymple and Anita Anand. The gem is one of the largest cut diamonds in the world, weighing 105.6 carats (21.12 g), and part of the British Crown Jewels. Koh-i-Noor is Persian for "Mountain of Light"; it has been known by this name since the 18th century. It was originally mined in South India (in the present-day state of Andhra Pradesh) long before the 13th Century CE, and changed hands between various factions in modern-day India, Pakistan, Iran, and Afghanistan, until being ceded to Queen Victoria after the Second Anglo-Sikh War, which resulted in the Punjab region falling under Company rule in 1849.

== Summary ==
Introduction

The introduction of the book describes the event at the center of contemporary controversy, which is that the East India Company compelled 10-year-old Duleep Singh, heir to the Sikh Empire, to agree to the 1849 Treaty of Lahore, and its stipulation that he give the Koh-i-Noor to the East India Company.

Shortly after the diamond came into the possession of the East India Company, Governor-General Lord Dalhousie tasked 22-year old civil servant Theo Metcalfe with compiling the history of the diamond prior to 1849. Metcalfe himself said that he was unable to do a good job, but what he wrote has become the most popular and circulated record of the diamond's history.

=== The Jewel in the Throne ===
Indian Prehistory of the Koh-i-Noor

The chapter discusses how India and the rest of the world thought about diamonds before around 1500. Before the 1725 discovery of diamond mines in Brazil, almost all of the world's diamonds came from the Indian subcontinent. Various classical Hindu texts, including the Garuda Purana, Bhagavad Gita, Vishnu Purana, the Ratna Shastra, all talk about diamonds and people's relationship to them. There are Indian cultural traditions to depict jewelry in the arts. There is a summary of the chapter on diamonds in Garcia de Orta's 1563 book Colóquios dos simples e drogas da India.

The Mughals and the Koh-i-Noor

The chapter begins with the story of Babur establishing the Mughal Empire in India. In his autobiography, Baburnama, he discusses his jewels including large diamonds. There are various accounts of Mughal jewels including reports sent by English ambassador Thomas Roe from the Mughal court to England, Jahangir's autobiography, Tuzk-e-Jahangiri, and the Shahjahannama. Various reports about the Peacock Throne describe jewels and the Koh-i-Noor was said to be part of that throne.

Nader Shah- The Koh-i-Noor goes to Iran

The chapter tells the story of Nader Shah and his invasion of the Mughal empire. In 1739, he took the Peacock Throne, looted the Mughal treasury, and acquired the Koh-i-Noor. There is a summary of whatever written accounts there are of anyone who saw the transfer of jewels from Delhi to Afsharid Iran.

The Durranis- The Koh-i-Noor in Afghanistan

The chapter tells the story of how Ahmad Shah Durrani acquired the Koh-i-Noor. The gem then passed onto his grandson Zaman Shah Durrani. His younger brother Shah Shujah Durrani then had the gem and traded it to Ranjit Singh in exchange for respite after losing his family empire.

Ranjit Singh- The Koh-i-Noor in Lahore

Ranjit Singh was leader of the Sikh Empire. He acquired the Koh-i-Noor after specifically seeking it out.

=== The Jewel in the Crown ===
City of Ash

As Ranjit Singh aged and as the Sikh Empire began to fall he participated in discussions about what he would like done with the treasury. Some interpretations say that he left the Koh-i-Noor to the Sikh state. Some say that he committed it to the brahmins at Jagannath Temple, Puri. Various reports including those of Claude Martin Wade watched what would happen to the jewels.

The Boy King

After the Second Anglo-Sikh War, Duleep Singh was forced to give up the diamond to Lord Dalhousie through the Treaty of Lahore. From there the East India Company agents prepared the Koh-i-Noor for shipment to the British court.

Passage to England

John Spencer Login, a British diplomat in India, adopted Duleep Singh to be raised with his wife and family in India. Duleep Singh's mother was exiled to Nepal. Dalhousie organized the shipping of the Koh-i-Noor by boat to England.

The Great Exhibition

On arrival in England the Koh-i-Noor was displayed to huge crowds at the Great Exhibition.

The First Cut

The chapter describes scientific and professional examination of the Koh-i-Noor and how it was cut. There is a summary of David Brewster's critique of the diamond. Garrard & Co contracted the Dutch diamond company Mozes Coster to plan for cutting the diamond. Maudslay, Sons & Field provided an engine to grind it. James Tennant oversaw the process. The Duke of Wellington made the ceremonial first cut in a media sensation.

Queen Victoria's "Loyal Subject"

After requesting to travel to England, Duleep Singh joined Queen Victoria's court. When he was 15 he repeated the ceremony of giving the Koh-i-Noor, in this instance to Victoria.

The Jewel and the Crown

Around age 21 Duleep Singh began to express a great longing for his mother and more distance from the people with whom he lived in the court. At age 22 he traveled to meet her at Spence's Hotel in Calcutta then brought her back to England. From this point his life went into chaos with him no longer behaving like his peers in British society and spending huge sums of money.

"We must take back the Koh-i-Noor"

This chapter reviews the various claims to the Koh-i-Noor and how each party makes its demands to the Crown to return it to them.

== Reviews ==
Various reviewers critiqued the book.
