= The Golden Road: How Ancient India Transformed the World =

2024 book by William Dalrymple

- First edition cover
- Author: William Dalrymple
- Language: English
- Genre: Non-fiction
- Publisher: Bloomsbury Publishing
- Publication date: 2024
- Publication place: United Kingdom
- Pages: 496
- ISBN: 978-1639734146
- OCLC: 1408379702
- Dewey Decimal: 934.
- Website: https://www.bloomsbury.com/uk/golden-road-9781408864418/

The Golden Road: How Ancient India Transformed the World is a 2024 history book by Scottish historian William Dalrymple. It discusses the ways in which India's ideas and influences spread throughout and shaped Eurasia. The book won the 2026 Mark Lynton History Prize.

== Overview ==
The book argues that the primary route connecting Eurasia from 250 BCE to 1200 CE was a route going through India referred to in the book as the "Golden Road"; this route facilitated an Indian sphere of influence, referred under the name Indosphere.

India's outward influence began with the west coast of India interacting with the outside world, with the Roman Empire's conquest of Egypt in the 1st century establishing the peak of Indo-Roman trade; the fall of Rome in the 5th and 6th centuries then forced Indian traders to turn their attention eastward, resulting in significant influence upon Southeast Asia. By the 7th century, Buddhism had penetrated China, with the reign of Wu Zetian resulting in a brief Indianization of the royal court and a general explosion of learning from India. And by the 13th century, Indian mathematical and astronomical ideas had gone through the Arab world and reached Europe, but in the same century, conquests put an end to the heretofore peaceful expansion of Indian influence. Mongol conquests in Eurasia ended India's centrality by paving the way for the Silk Road, giving China greater prominence as it thus gained access to the Mediterranean, while the large Muslim armies temporarily interrupted trade routes to India's west and took over North India.

Dalrymple was inspired to write the book after a visit to Angkor Wat, the largest Hindu temple in the world. He spent five years travelling throughout the Middle East, India and Southeast Asia to do research for the book.

== Reception ==
The Golden Road won the 2026 Mark Lynton History Prize.

Manu S. Pillai of Frontline wrote, "What is surprising about The Golden Road is the period: while all of Dalrymple's histories so far are set in the modern age, the newest one takes us to the ancient world. Its ambitions are greater, and Dalrymple is in fresh territory. But he pulls it off expertly. The book is edifying, well-structured, learned, and thoroughly interesting." The Week's Meera Suresh wrote, "The book's lustre lies in its exhaustive coverage of ancient Indian history and Dalrymple's true-to-life descriptions. From a historian's point, The Golden Road – How Ancient India Transformed the World is an ode to the forgotten chapters of ancient India and its unparalleled riches."

Tanjil Rashid of the Financial Times called The Golden Road "an absorbingly literary history, a tale of tales, and, in Dalrymple's telling, it was most notably through the dissemination of stories — including ideas and doctrines given narrative form — that ancient India 'transformed the world'."

Abhrajyoti Chakraborty, writing in The Observer, said that Dalrymple "is enthralled by the postcard monuments of ancient India's 'soft power': the magnificent Borobudur Buddhist temple in Indonesia; the Hindu temple Angkor Wat in Cambodia. He recounts the flourishing trade between ancient India and the Roman empire following the famous Battle of Alexandria in 30BC... He persuasively argues that this maritime trade route preceded the overland Silk Road connecting China, Turkey and the Mediterranean Sea by several centuries." He added, "It is only in the final pages that Dalrymple acknowledges the debates about Indian history that have become unavoidable in recent years."

== See also ==
- Indo-Mediterranean
- India–Middle East–Europe Economic Corridor
