= Olivia Fraser (artist) =

Scottish artist

- Education: University of Oxford
- Occupation: Artist
- Family: William Dalrymple (husband); Sam Dalrymple (son); James Baillie Fraser (great-great-great uncle); William Fraser (great-great-great uncle)

Olivia Fraser is a Scottish artist based in London. She is known for her paintings, particularly of India where she spends a considerable amount of her time.

== Career ==
Fraser took inspiration from James Bailie Fraser and moved to India in the late 1980s to paint the architecture of Delhi and travel watercolours of India. In India, she mastered the craft of the Hindu miniature. Later, she evolved her own method which is a combination of Indian styles and Bridget Riley's optical patterns.

Fraser's works have been exhibited in top galleries around the world.

HarperCollins published her book A Journey Within in 2019 with a foreword by B. N. Goswamy.

== Education and personal life ==
Fraser has an M.A. in Modern Languages from the University of Oxford. She is married to historian William Dalrymple. Together, they have three children. One of them, Sam Dalrymple, is a historian, writer, film-maker, peace activist, and social media influencer. Scottish travel writer and artist James Bailie Fraser and British India civil servant William Fraser were her great-great-great uncles.
