= India–Middle East–Europe Economic Corridor =

Economic corridor

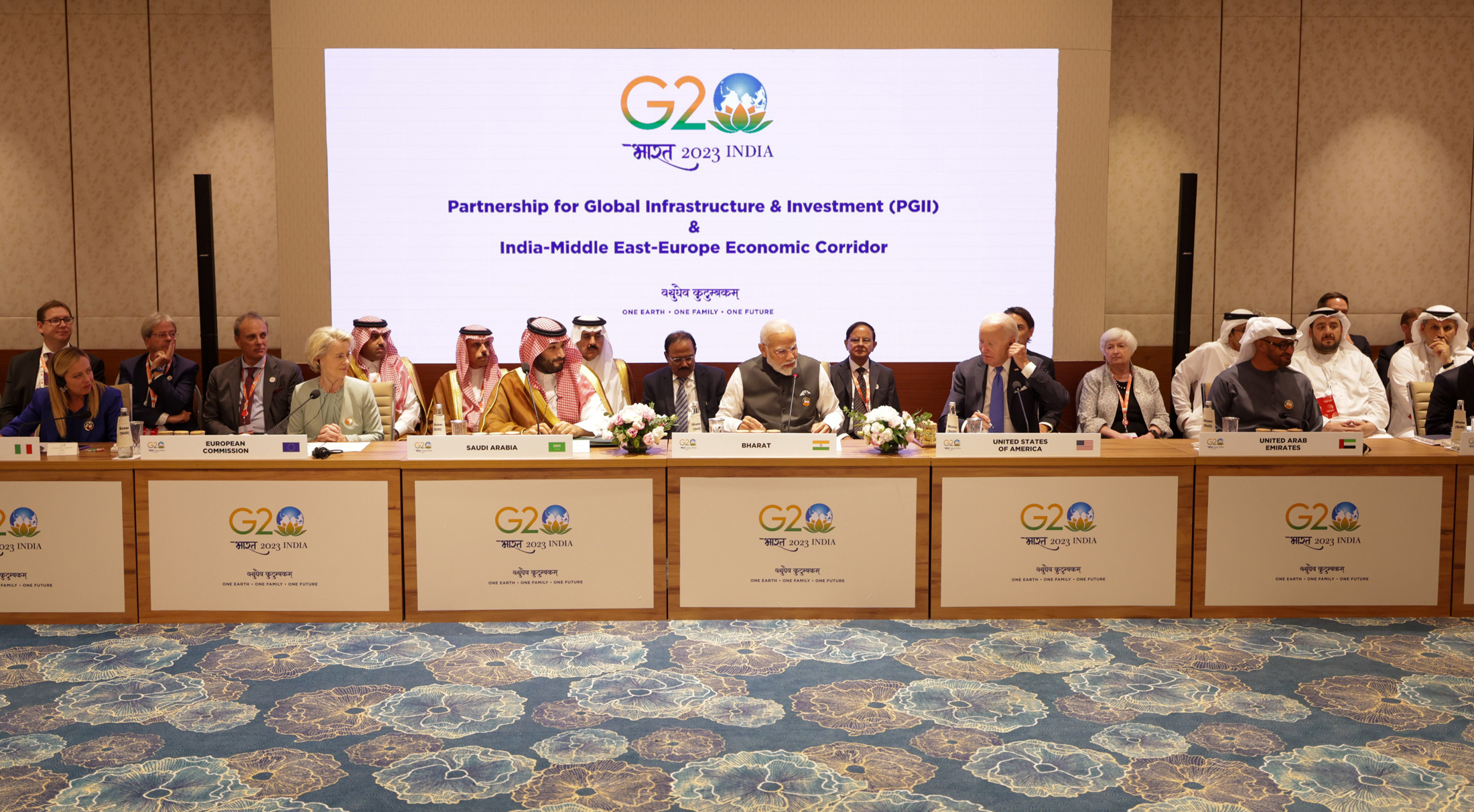
- Announcement of India–Middle East-Europe Economic Corridor in New Delhi

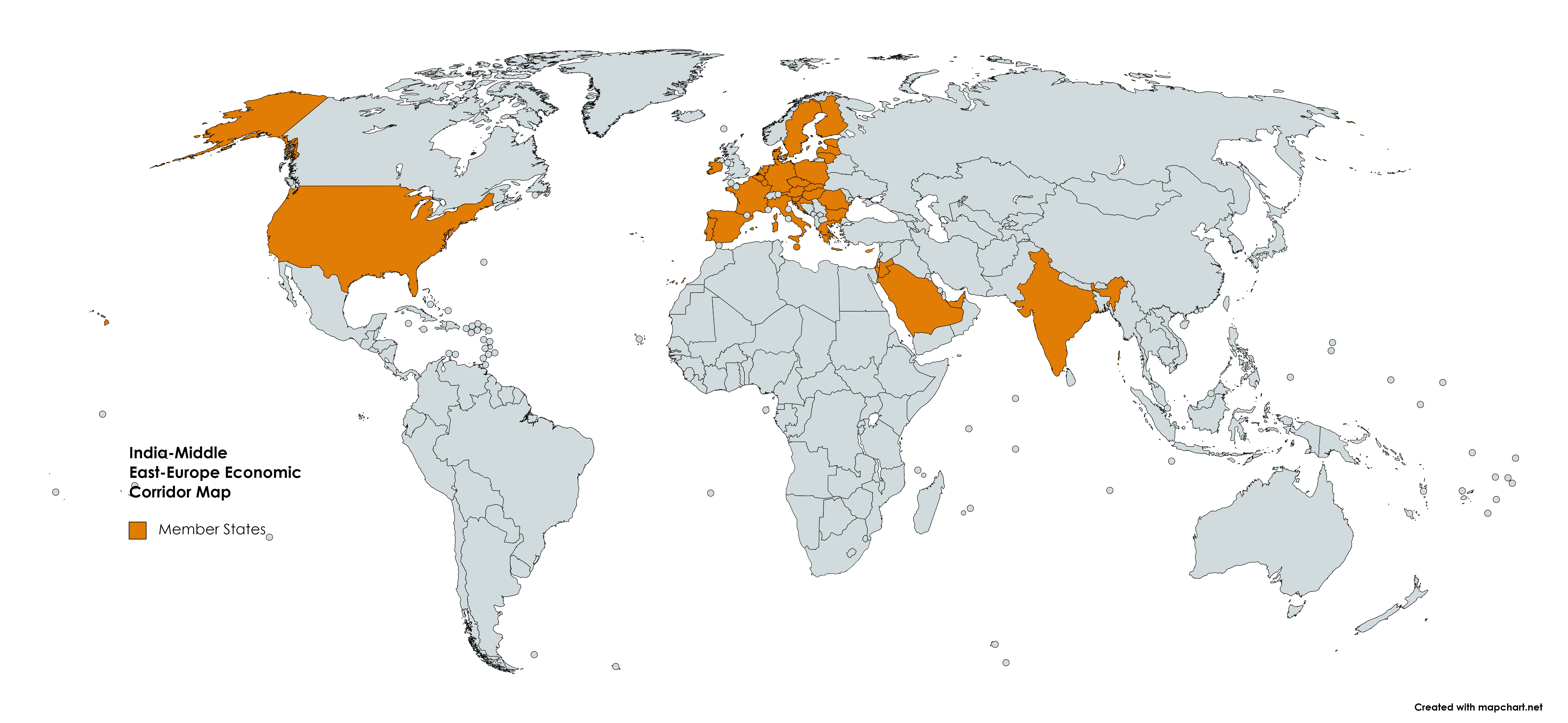
- India–Middle East–Europe Economic Corridor founder states and location map
- Abbreviation: IMEC
- Formation: 9 September 2023; 3 years ago
- Founder: India; United States; Saudi Arabia; United Arab Emirates; European Union; France; Germany; Italy
- Purpose: Promote economic development and inter-regional connectivity
- Locations: India; United Arab Emirates; Saudi Arabia; Jordan; Israel; Greece; European Union
- Website: www.imec.international

The India–Middle East–Europe Economic Corridor (commonly abbreviated as IMEC or IMEEC) (Note: Also occasionally abbreviated as IMEEC in media and policy discussions.) is a planned connectivity project that aims to bolster economic development by fostering connectivity and economic integration between Asia, the Persian Gulf and Europe. The economic corridor would consist of an infrastructure route from India to Europe through the United Arab Emirates, Saudi Arabia, Israel, and Greece. The route draws on what is now described as the ancient Golden Road. As of 2026, the initiative had been stalled by the Gaza war.

== History ==
IMEC and its connections

=== Diplomatic foundations ===
The diplomatic foundations of the India–Middle East–Europe Economic Corridor rest on decades of evolving geopolitical realignments. Early groundwork began with India's 2005 Look West policy, which improved bilateral relations between New Delhi and Gulf nations. Policy briefs by prominent think tanks also report that the 2020 Abraham Accords have been influential, as they normalized ties between Israel and several Arab states and therefore paved the way for further integration. This shift directly facilitated the 2022 creation of the I2U2 grouping, consisting of India, Israel, the United Arab Emirates and the United States. The I2U2 grouping serves as IMEC's conceptual precursor as these joint diplomatic engagements set the stage for the corridor's formal 2023 announcement.

=== The 2023 Memorandum of Understanding ===
The IMEC was officially announced by India during the G20 Summit in New Delhi in 2023. During this summit, the representatives of the governments of India, the United States, the United Arab Emirates, Saudi Arabia, France, Germany, Italy and the European Union signed a Memorandum of Understanding. While not formal signatories, Jordan and Israel are unofficially included as the proposed infrastructure route passes through their country. The agreement currently still functions as a broad declaration of intent, since it still lacks a detailed overarching funding plan or concrete implementation mechanism.

=== Reactions ===
Chinese analysts were critical of the announcement, mentioning its "organizational fragility and lack of developing country focus, alluding to the BRI’s clear first-mover advantage, IMEC’s overreliance on maritime transport and lack of overland connectivity, and its exclusion of Iran and Turkiye." In September 2023, Turkish president Recep Tayyip Erdogan criticised the project for bypassing Turkey, and vowed for an alternative route, the "Iraq–Europe Development Road Project", which is envisaged to connect the Persian Gulf with Europe through railway and highway via ports in the UAE, Qatar, and Iraq, including the under-construction Grand Faw Port.

== Infrastructure networks ==
The project was initially structured around three primary pillars of connectivity: transportation, energy and digital. Later, the official focus of IMEC was shifted to infrastructure development, sustainability and innovation.

=== Infrastructure development ===
This pillar includes a vast multimodal infrastructure network divided into two corridors. The Eastern Corridor utilizes maritime routes to connect India's Western ports to the Persian Gulf. The Northern Corridor links the Gulf countries to Europe through an overland railway network spanning the U.A.E., Saudi Arabia, Jordan, and Israel, followed by maritime transit across the Mediterranean Sea. The combination of maritime, road and rail transport ensures flexibility and resilience compared infrastructure networks that are based on only one mode of transport. A resilient trade network means that supply chains can quickly adjust to unexpected challenges. This ensures that goods and materials continue to flow smoothly across borders, even in challenging circumstances.

There has been healthy competition between European countries for IMEC's European terminal with France (Marseilles), Greece (Piraeus/Thessaloniki) and Italy (Trieste) being candidates. The 2025 Trieste Summit has been announced to promote Trieste as a "strategic gateway port" for IMEC.

The participating states in the IMEC also aim to develop infrastructure in other sectors than transportation. The first one is the energy sector. The IMEC includes the construction of a large interconnected electricity grid that ensures a reliable supply of electricity for every participating state. The participating states in the IMEC also aim to create infrastructure for green hydrogen. There have already been several hydrogen projects across the corridor, including the H2V FOS Hydrogen Hub in Marseille, the Trieste Hydrogen Hub and the North Adriatic H2 Terminal in Italy, and the NEOM and Yanbu green hydrogen hubs in Saudi Arabia. The second sector is the digital sector. Part of the IMEC is the construction digital infrastructure in the form of fiber-optic cables designed to create a resilient, cross-border "data superhighway" for improved telecommunications and secure data transfer.

=== Sustainability ===
The IMEC specifically focuses on its sustainability, aiming to decrease ecological harm and at the same time foster long-term economic development. To achieve this, the IMEC incorporates infrastructure for renewable energy, and specifically green hydrogen. Furthermore, while shipping via the Suez Canal or around the Cape of Good Hope produces high greenhouse gas emissions, utilizing the IMEC's overland railway and multimodal routes offers a much greener alternative. Modeling suggests that overland transshipments through the IMEC could save 47,5% in fuel consumption relative to traversing the Suez Canal. The development of a green hydrogen pipeline will also contribute to the energy transition in Europe, India, Saudi Arabia and the U.A.E., as it provides a clean energy alternative for hard-to-abate sectors such as steelmaking, chemicals and maritime transport. According to several think tank reports, by the mid-2030s the IMEC could feature hydrogen refueling hubs that power zero-emission logistics, including long-haul trucking, railways and shipping along the corridor. The EU has claimed that this makes the IMEC more relevant to them, since it aligns with the decarbonization objectives set out in the European Green Deal.

=== Innovation ===
The IMEC intends to utilize cutting-edge digital infrastructure, artificial intelligence and data analytics to implement intelligence systems that optimize the movement of products and services. This integration of physical transportation with digital technologies is a form of disruptive innovation. One example of this is the use of artificial intelligence and blockchain systems to increase the efficiency of transportation networks. Another example is the use of a digital payment system to optimize customs procedures at the borders.

== Strategic and geopolitical objectives ==
Participating countries in the Belt and Road Initiative. Green = signed agreement with China. Light green = withdrawn. Yellow = de facto participant.

The 2023 Memorandum of Understanding states the overarching goal of the IMEC: "stimulating economic development through enhanced connectivity and economic integration between Asia, the Persian Gulf and Europe". The participating states in the IMEC see the construction of physical infrastructure as the method to achieve this economic integration.

The corridor is also widely viewed as a providing an alternative to China's Belt and Road Initiative (BRI). The IMEC provides an alternative to the current trade route going through the Suez Canal, which is a critical node in the Chinese Maritime Silk Road. However, every participating state also has its own strategic and geopolitical objectives in joining the IMEC.

=== The United States ===
==== Providing an alternative to the Belt and Road Initiative ====
There is a general consensus in the public discourse on the IMEC that the main strategic objective of the U.S. is to provide a direct alternative to the Chinese Belt and Road Initiative. By pitching the U.S. as a trustworthy partner for developing nations, the U.S. aims to prevent China from expanding its geopolitical and economic footprint in the Middle East and Eurasia. The IMEC can be a tool for the U.S. to demonstrate effective American leadership and cement its influence in the region.

==== Securing global supply chains ====
Through the IMEC, the Biden administration aimed to achieve control over supply chains that are essential for the energy transition and decrease its dependence on Chinese supply chains. This is one of the main goals of the U.S.-led Partnership for Global Infrastructure and Investment (PGII), by which much of the projects within IMEC are funded.

According to a report by the Atlantic Council, an American center right-wing think tank, the U.S. can use the IMEC as a geopolitical tool to reach several of its foreign policy goals. Examples of such goals are supporting a free and open Eurasia, deepening bilateral relationships with states across the region and strengthening maritime security. The IMEC also provides the U.S. an opportunity to invest in central logistics hubs, such as in Jordan, as a way to support broader economic reconstruction in areas like Syria and Iraq.

==== The Abraham Accords ====
The IMEC is designed to build upon the framework of the Abraham Accords to promote broader regional integration and peace, specifically linking Arab nations and Israel through shared infrastructure. The Biden administration had originally envisioned that these economic alliances would form the basis for a mutual defense treaty between Saudi Arabia and Israel. More broadly, the corridor also serves as a mechanism to repair strained bilateral relations between the U.S. and Saudi Arabia.

Some researchers have also argued that the IMEC presents a possibility to help facilitate the reconstruction of Gaza, as the transportation routes directly cross Palestinian harbors and will therefore increase trade between Palestine and Israel.

=== India ===
As the initiating partner of the IMEC, India aims to become a trusted bridge of global connectivity. At the 2023 G20 Summit in New Delhi, Prime Minister Narendra Modi has said: "We believe that connectivity is a means to not only increase mutual trade between different countries, but also increase mutual trust."

The Indian government uses the IMEC to increase its exports, improve its competitiveness on global markets, and position itself as a regional hub for trade and manufacturing. By deepening connectivity with Gulf states and expanding their market access to Europe, India hopes to attract European and Gulf capital to support its domestic economic development.

By creating the IMEC, India also provides a logistical alternative to overland routes passing through is historical adversary, Pakistan. Furthermore, the IMEC offers a strategically viable alternative to mitigate the decline in trade along the International North-South Transport Corridor (INSTC), which has been hampered by Western sanctions on Russia and Iran.

India also aims to improve its strategic alignment with the United States, the European Union, and Gulf countries to win support for its developmental and political priorities. Additionally, India uses the IMEC to build upon the Abraham Accords to improve regional stability. Thereby, it aims to signal its leadership in the Global South and supports shifting of the world order towards multipolarity, meaning that there are more than two relevant power blocs in international system.

=== Saudi Arabia ===
Saudi Arabia is one of the founding signatories of the IMEC and serves a crucial role within the IMEC. First of all, Saudi Arabia is an important geographic element of the IMEC, as its massive landmass forms the overland link of the IMEC. The corridor will rely heavily on Saudi rail networks, requiring new links from Al Ghuwaifat at the U.A.E. border to Haradh, and from the Saudi interior to the Jordanian border at Al-Haditha.

The IMEC offers Saudi Arabia a tool to reach the goals set out in its Saudi Vision 2030 strategy, which aims to diversify the Kingdom's economy away from a reliance on fossil fuel exports. Thereby, Saudi Arabia is expected to play a leading role in the energy pillar of the IMEC. The kingdom is investing heavily in renewable energy and green hydrogen production and intends to use the corridor to export clean electricity and hydrogen to Europe via pipelines and undersea cables.

In 2023 Crown Prince Mohammed bin Salman praised the initiative as a transformative project for the global economy and pledged $20 billion toward the associated Partnership for Global Infrastructure and Investments(PGII) to support the development of the IMEC. By participating in the corridor, the Kingdom hopes to position itself as a crucial economic bridge linking Asia, Europe and Africa. Rather than adopting the perspective of countering Chinese influence, Saudi Arabia remains pragmatic and remains part of both the Belt and Road Initiative and the IMEC. Saudi Arabia sees both the IMEC and the Belt and Road Initiative as tools to augment its geopolitical influence across Asia and Europe.

However, after the October 7th attacks by Hamas and the following Gaza war, diplomatic relations between Israel and Saudi Arabia have been strained, effectively paralyzing the critical Saudi-Jordan-Israel rail segment of the corridor for the near future.

=== The United Arab Emirates ===
The U.A.E. sees the IMEC as an opportunity to position itself as a central logistics hub between Asia and Europe. Furthermore, the IMEC aligns with the Operation 300bn strategies of the U.A.E., which aim to diversify the Emirati economy away from a reliance on fossil fuel exports and stimulate the development of their manufacturing and technology sectors. The U.A.E. expects that the IMEC will double its non-oil foreign trade to Dh4 trillion by 2031. To facilitate this, the U.A.E. has already signed Comprehensive Economic Partnership Agreements with key IMEC partners like India and Israel.

Geographically, the U.A.E. forms a critical node in the Eastern Corridor. The U.A.E. is involved in the IMEC in several dimension

- Ports and railways: Major Emirati ports, particularly Jebel Ali in Dubai and Khalifa Port in Abu Dhabi, are designated to handle the bulk of maritime cargo arriving from India. From these ports, goods will transition to the U.A.E.'s rapidly expanding Etihad Rail network, which connects the U.A.E.'s coast to the Saudi border at Al Ghuwaifat.
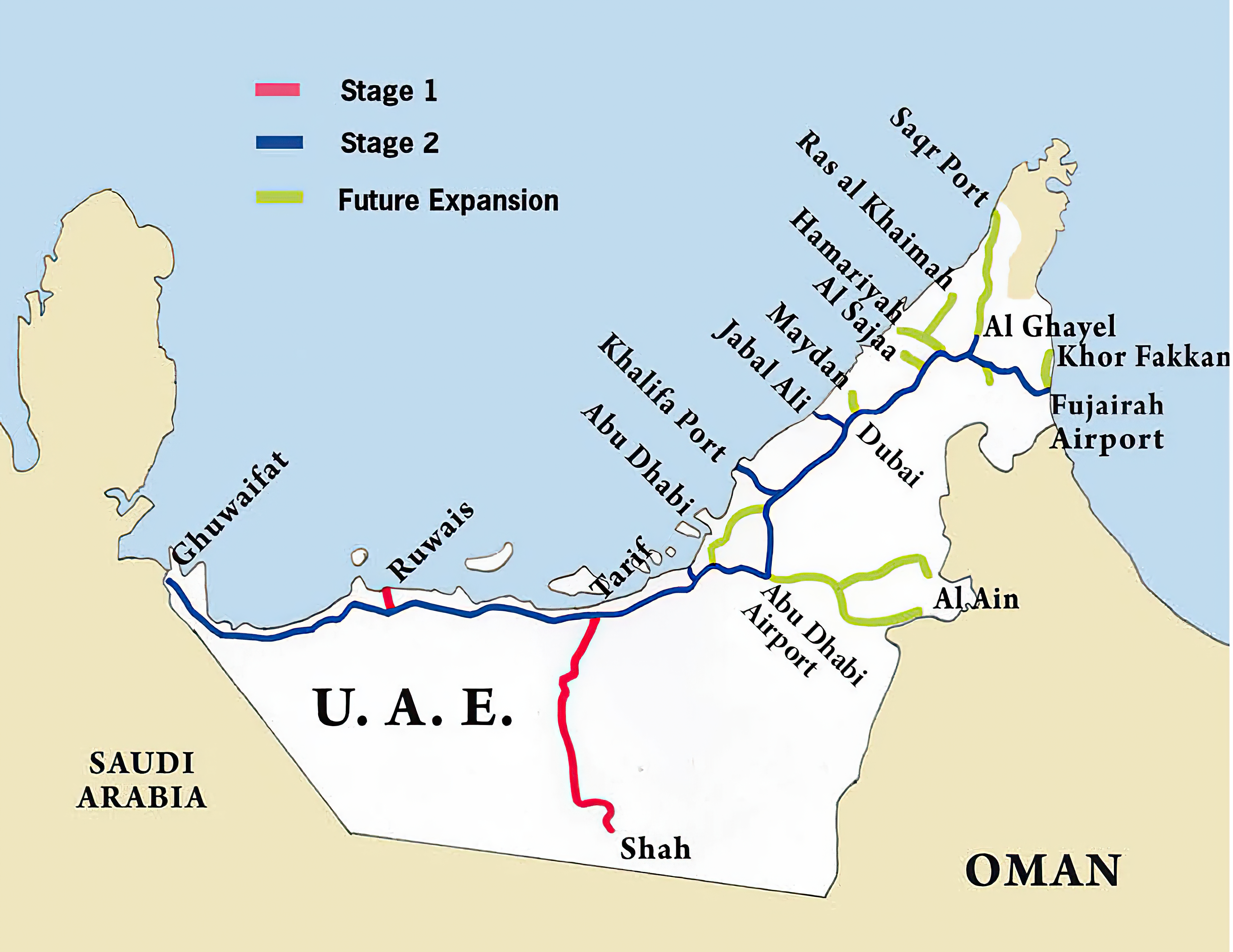
  Future railway lines of Etihad Rail in the U.A.E. (2022)
- Digital trade and customs: The U.A.E. and India have been the most active IMEC partners in implementing soft connectivity, launching a Virtual Trade Corridor in 2023 that aims to lower transit times. The U.A.E. and India are currently also testing a unified digital platform designed to harmonize customs and regulatory clearance between the two nations.
- Energy and technology: The U.A.E. is a leader in green energy and digital infrastructure, and it intends to use the IMEC to export green hydrogen and clean electricity to Europe. To support the IMEC's digital pillar, the U.A.E. is also heavily investing in data centers, cloud infrastructure and AI logistics platforms to serve as the digital backbone processing regional trade information.

The U.A.E. is also a participant in the Belt and Road Initiative and upholds diplomatic relations with both China and the U.S.. As argued in the Bradley Intelligence Report, Saudi Arabia and the United Arab Emirates do not see IMEC as a challenge to China but as a diversification of their economies, strengthening their positions as inter-regional connectivity hubs and maximizing their geopolitical influence across Asia and Europe.

=== Italy ===
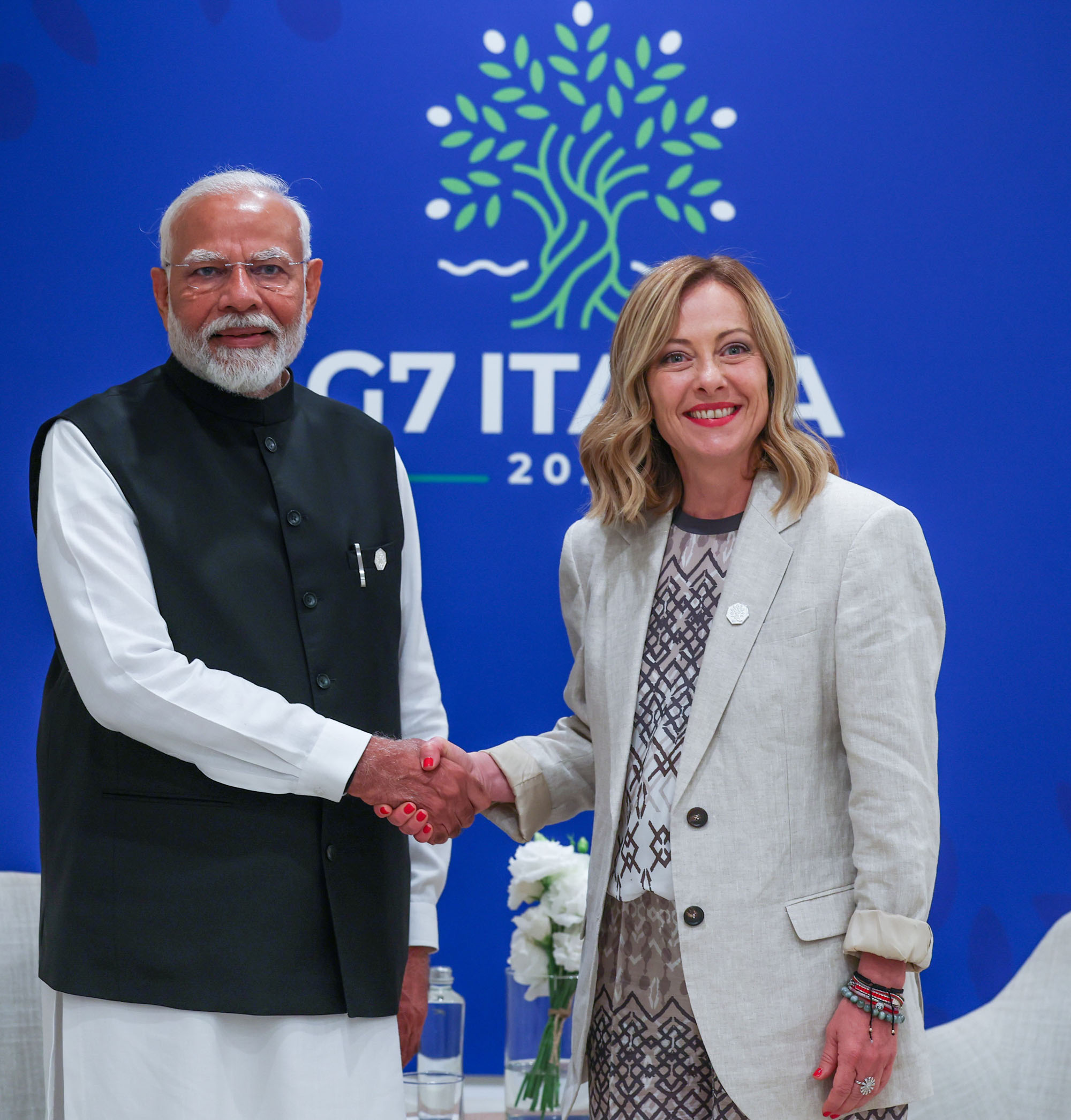
Indian Prime Minister Narendra Modi meeting with the Italian Prime Minister Ms. Giorgia Meloni at the G7 Summit in 2024

Italy is one of the founding signatories of the IMEC. It was also the first G7 country to join China's Belt and Road Initiative in 2019. However, Prime Minister Giorgia Meloni announced in 2023 that Italy would exit the initiative in 2024, stating that it brought "no clear benefits".

Following its shift away from the BRI, Italy became one of the key partners in the IMEC in 2023. Italy views IMEC as a vital geopolitical platform to preserve its influence in global maritime trade by securing new partners like India. Therefore, Italy is particularly positioning its port in Trieste as the IMEC's primary gateway to Europe, competing with Marseille in France and Piraeus in Greece. The Italian government also aims to establish Italy as southern Europe's main entry point for energy supplies. On top of that, Italy also intends to provide Italian construction firms opportunities to work on India's infrastructure development.

=== France ===
France is one of the founding signatories of the IMEC. For France, participation in the IMEC is part of its broader Indo-Pacific Strategy aimed at diversifying supply chains. President Emmanuel Macron sees France's involvement in the IMEC as a way to forge an alternative to the superpower rivalry between the U.S. and China. Macron has stressed that both France and India want to work with the U.S. and China.

France has taken a proactive leadership role in the corridor's development. For example, it was the first country to appoint a special envoy for IMEC. Another example is that France has hosted a dedicated IMEC summit in Marseille in June 2025. An objective for France is to position Marseille as the primary European entry pont for the corridor.

=== Germany ===
Germany is one of the founding signatories of the IMEC. Germany views the IMEC as a critical component of its National Hydrogen Strategy and a tool to diversify its energy imports away from Russia. IMEC's proposed clean hydrogen pipelines and electricity grids align with the need of the German government to cover hydrogen demand with imported hydrogen from the Gulf.

The IMEC further supports Germany's foreign policy goals. Firstly, it supports Germany's 2023 Strategy on China, which emphasizes reducing dependence on Chinese supply chains. Secondly, IMEC serves as a framework to strengthen the increasingly important German-Indian partnership. Thirdly, the IMEC aligns with Germany's broader objectives of promoting peace in the Middle East and ensuring Israel's national security through regional and economic integration.

Economically, the IMEC is expected to boost the German industry, specifically through its exports to India in key sectors as machinery, electronics, medical items and chemicals. According to several think tanks, German engineering and infrastructure companies are also uniquely positioned to contribute to the construction of the IMEC as a physical infrastructure network.

=== European Union ===
The European Union is a founding signatory of the IMEC. Ursula von der Leyen, the president of the European Commission, has championed the project as a "green and digital bridge across continents and civilizations" capable of making trade between India and Europe 40% faster. During Von der Leyen's visit to India in February 2025, both Prime Minister Narendra Modi and she agreed on the importance of IMEC, the excerpt of the joint statement read: "Undertake concrete steps for the realization of the India–Middle East–Europe Economic Corridor (IMEC) announced during the G20 Leaders' Summit in New Delhi".

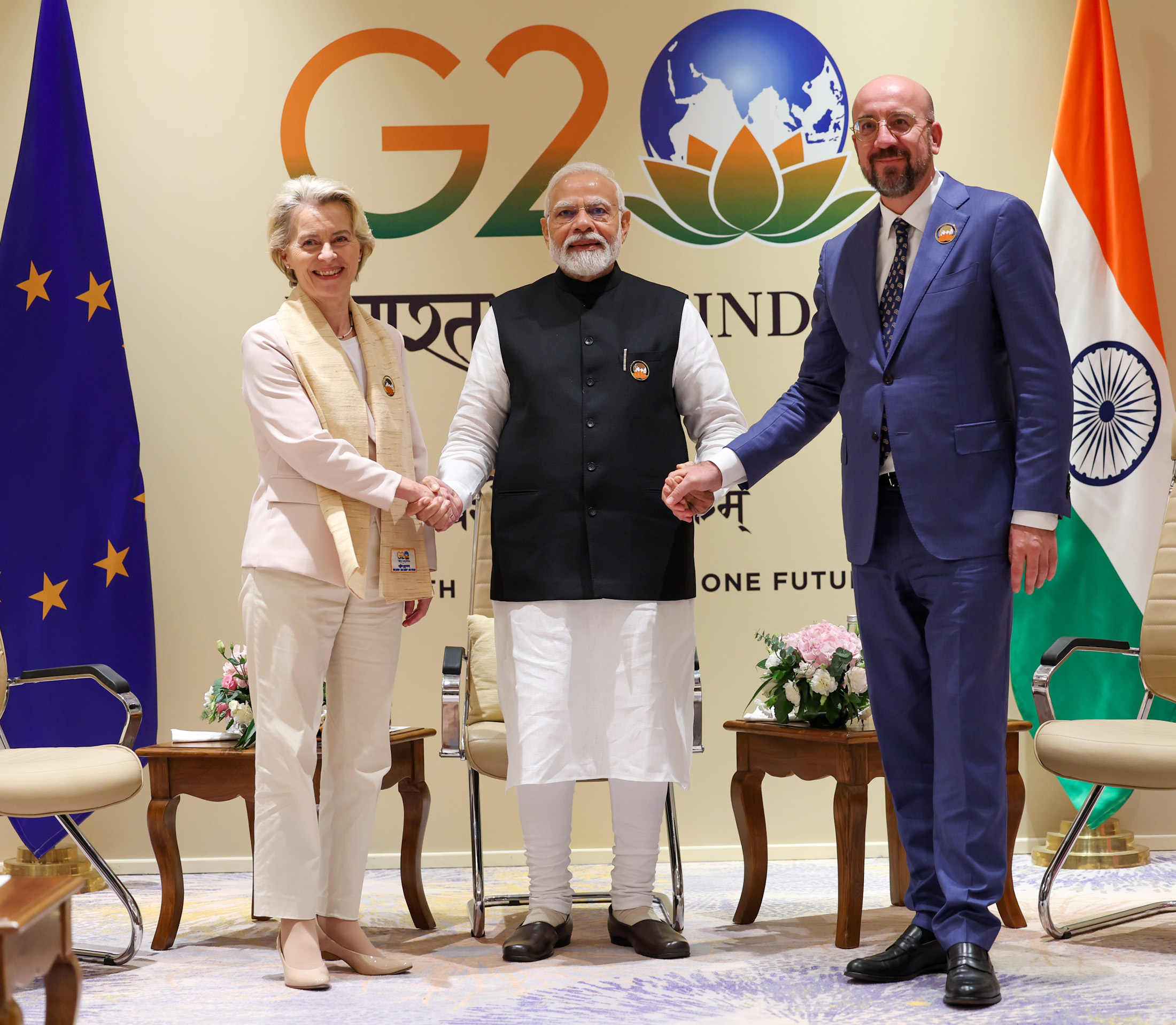
Indian Prime Minister Narendra Modi meeting with Ms. Ursula von der Leyen and Mr. Charles Michel during the G20 Summit in New Delhi in 2023

The E.U. mainly intends for IMEC to serve as an implementation of its €300 billion Global Gateway strategy, which aims to mobilize public and private investments for sustainable infrastructure in developing countries. By operationalizing the IMEC, the EU hopes to push back against China's global influence by offering a transparent, rules-based, and mutually beneficial alternative to Beijing's Belt and Road Initiative.

Furthermore, the IMEC provides the E.U. a tool to decrease its reliance on Chinese supply chains critical materials for its green transition. Especially following the decoupling from Russian fossil fuels caused by the war in Ukraine, the IMEC's energy infrastructure development is considered important for Europe's long-term energy security.

Diplomatically, the E.U. utilizes the IMEC to repair its image and deepen partnerships with the Global South. By building physical infrastructure alongside India and the Gulf countries, the EU seeks to prove it is a reliable partner capable of delivering concrete economic development rather than just imposing top-down regulations.

=== Israel ===
Israel is not one of the founding signatories of the IMEC, but has been a part of the I2U2 grouping that complements the IMEC. However, it serves as critical geographic node in the corridor, as it serves as the primary gateway to the Mediterranean Sea. Goods will arrive overland from the U.A.E., Saudi Arabia and Jordan and reach the port of Haifa before crossing the Mediterranean Sea to Europe. To handle the anticipated trade volume, Israel plans to double its national rail network by 2040 and is undertaking majority capacity upgrades at Haifa Port, which was recently purchased by India's Adani Group.

In September 2024, Israel's Prime Minister Benjamin Netanyahu called the corridor a "blessing" for the Middle East, and referred to Iran and its allies as a "curse" in his address to the 79th session of the United Nations General Assembly. The U.S. and Israel view the IMEC as a diplomatic mechanism to advance the Abraham Accords and facilitate the normalization of diplomatic relations between Israel and Saudi Arabia. Israeli officials have championed the corridor as a "peace train" designed to foster regional stability and prosperity.

=== Jordan ===
Although Jordan's geography makes it a mandatory transit point for the corridor, it was not an initial signatory to the 2023 IMEC Memorandum of Understanding. Instead, it is considered an "anticipated future signatory". The Jordanian government views IMEC as aligning closely with its national development priorities, particularly in attracting foreign direct investment, generating domestic employment, reinforcing peace with Israel and establishing itself as a regional logistics hub.

However, the lack of a functioning railway infrastructure network in Jordan serves as a bottleneck for the whole trade network. The government is currently unable to resolve this due to financial and bureaucratic difficulties. Furthermore, building a railway infrastructure network between Jordan and Israel poses unique technical difficulties, as the route requires building bridges or tunnels to cross the Jordan River and has to go through steep and difficult terrain.

== Challenges ==
=== Impact of the Gaza war ===
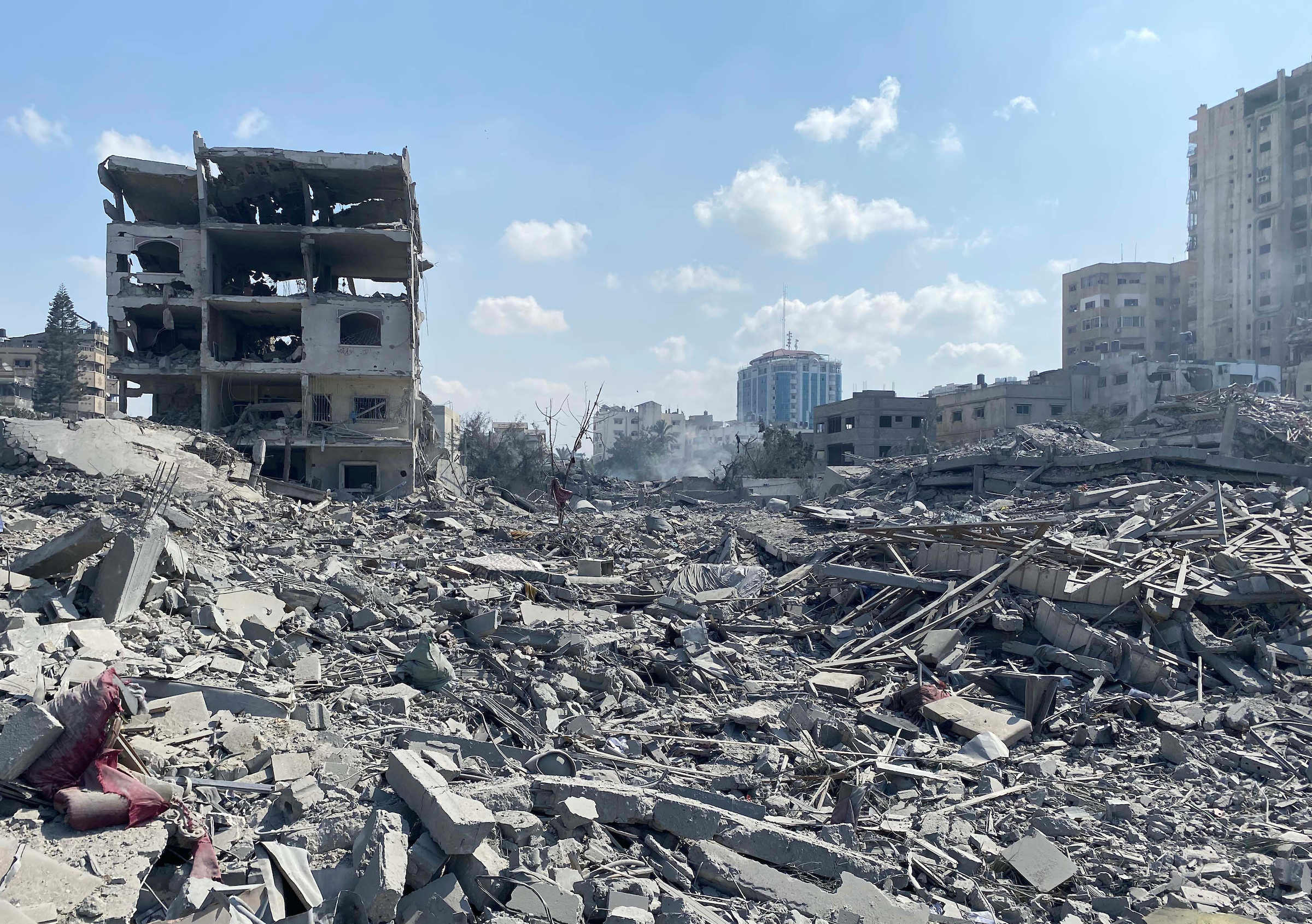
The destruction in Gaza in October 2023

The October 7 attacks and the following Gaza War have significantly stalled the project. While the long-term strategic and economic goals of the initiative remain intact, the conflict has paralyzed the Northern Corridor connecting the Gulf countries to Europe via Israel. Several Middle Eastern think tanks report that one of the reasons for this is that the civilian death toll and devastation in Gaza have sparked immense outrage across the Arab world, making Saudi-Israel normalization talks more difficult. The governments of the Gulf partners in IMEC therefore view collaboration with Israel through the IMEC as a choice that carries high reputational costs. A second reason is that the conflict has shattered the image of the region as a safe, predictable environment for massive infrastructure investments. The conflict has also triggered broader regional instability, most notably the Houthi attacks on commercial shipping in the Red Sea. This volatility makes private investors and stakeholders hesitant to commit the billions of dollars needed for the IMEC's rail and energy networks. However, the IMEC also provides an alternative to bypass the Houthi blockade in the Red Sea.

=== Economic rivalry between the U.A.E. and Saudi Arabia ===
Multiple think tank reports highlight that the economic rivalry between the U.A.E. and Saudi Arabia poses a challenge to the IMEC. Both nations are competing for dominance as the Middle East's premier business and logistics center. This has led to Saudi Arabia implementing protectionist tariffs on goods from the U.A.E.. Experts warn that this inter-Gulf competition presents a serious challenge to the seamless cross-border transits that the IMEC requires to function effectively.

According to an analysis from the Institute for National Security Studies, the UAE sees the IMEC as a practical concept that can be readily integrated into its existing infrastructure and logistics network, while Saudi Arabia sees it as an strategic asset and future project.

== The future of the IMEC ==
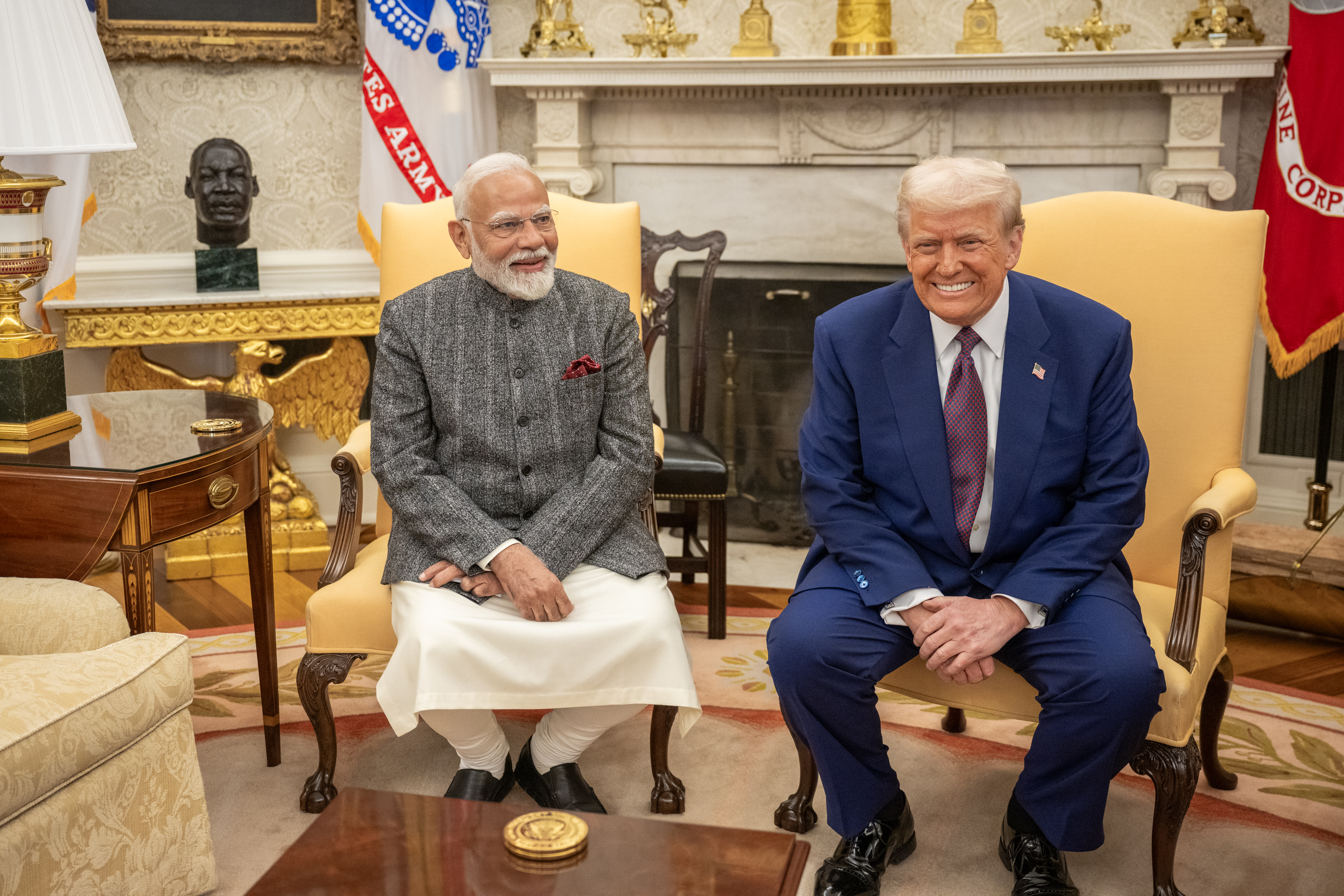
President Tump and Prime Minister Modi at the White House in 2025

IMEC got a new lease and enthusiasm has returned to the project during Indian Prime Minister Narendra Modi's first visit to the White House after the inauguration of President Donald Trump. "We agreed to work together to help build one of the greatest trade routes in all of history. It will run from India to Israel to Italy and onward to the US, connecting our partners, roads, railways and undersea cables, many many undersea cables." said the US president.

Both TRENDS Research and the Atlantic Council suggest that the project has been offset by several challenges, but has also seen progress through local initiatives and bilateral agreements. India and the U.A.E. are continuing to advance the eastern leg of the corridor, signing formal intergovernmental framework agreements in early 2024 to streamline customs and maritime connectivity. Meanwhile, both Saudi Arabia and the U.A.E. are utilizing the diplomatic pause to fund and modernize their own domestic rail, port and green energy infrastructure. Experts suggest that while the Gaza war prevents the full realization of the IMEC for now, these continued Gulf and Indian investments will keep the project alive until diplomatic conditions become more favorable.

The signing of a long-awaited EU-India trade deal in January 2026 is also expected to give IMEC extra momentum.

== See also ==
- Blue Dot Network
- Build Back Better World
- Global Gateway
- India's International connectivity projects
- Partnership for Global Infrastructure and Investment
