= William Dalrymple =

British historian and writer (born 1965)

William Dalrymple CBE FRSL FRSE FRHistS
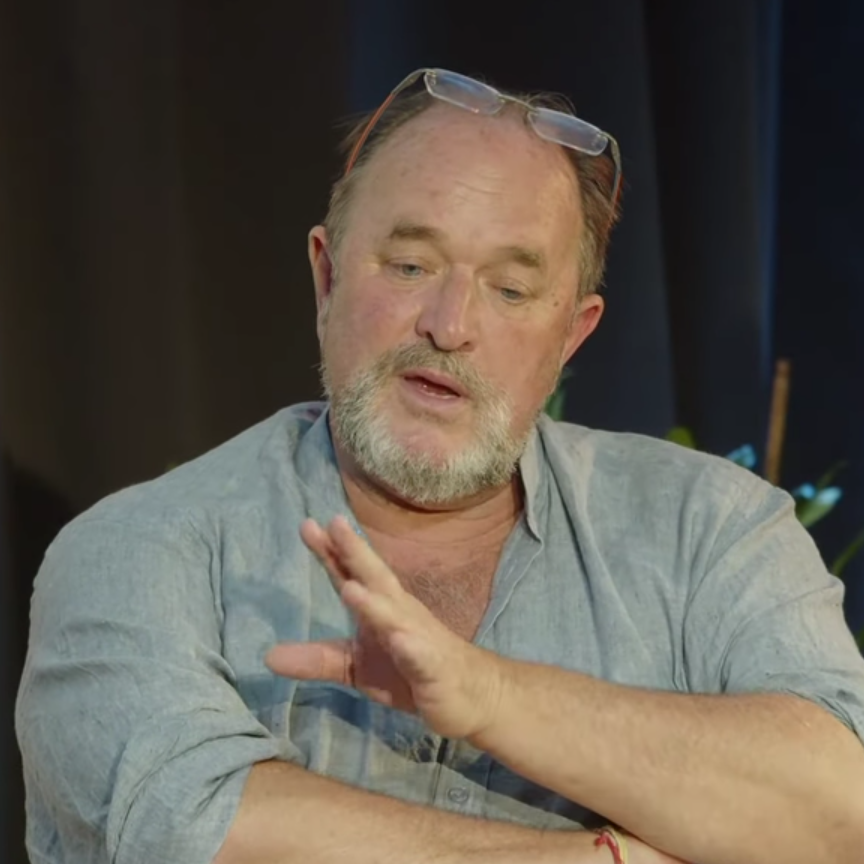
- Dalrymple in 2025
- Born: 20 March 1965 (age 61); Edinburgh, Scotland
- Education: Trinity College, Cambridge (BA)
- Occupations: Historian, writer, -broadcaster
- Spouse: Olivia Fraser
- Children: 3, including Sam Dalrymple
- Writing career
- Period: 1989–present
- Subjects: The East India Company in 18th-century South Asia and Afghanistan, Eastern Christianity and the Muslim world; Hindu and Buddhist art; late Mughal and Company school painting
- Website: williamdalrymple.com

William Benedict Hamilton-Dalrymple (born 20 March 1965) is a Scottish historian, art historian, indologist, curator, broadcaster, critic and author.

Dalrymple's books have won numerous awards and prizes, including the Wolfson History Prize, the Duff Cooper Prize, the Hemingway, the Kapuściński, the Arthur Ross Medal of the Council on Foreign Relations, the Thomas Cook Travel Book Award, Mark Lynton History Prize and the Sunday Times Young British Writer of the Year Award. He has been five times long-listed and once shortlisted for the Baillie Gifford Prize for non-fiction and was a finalist for the Cundill History Prize. The BBC television documentary on his pilgrimage to the source of the river Ganges, "Shiva's Matted Locks", one of three episodes of his Indian Journeys series, which Dalrymple wrote and presented, won him the Grierson Award for Best Documentary Series at BAFTA in 2002.

In 2012 he was appointed a Whitney J. Oates Visiting Fellow in the Humanities by Princeton University. In 2015 he was appointed the OP Jindal Distinguished Lecturer at Brown University. In 2018 he was awarded the President's Medal of the British Academy, the academy's highest honour in its suite of prizes and medals awarded for "outstanding service to the cause of the humanities and social sciences". He is also since 2021 an honorary fellow of the Bodleian Library. He was a visiting fellow at All Souls College, Oxford, in 2024.

He was named in the 2020 Prospect list of the top 50 thinkers for the COVID-19 era. He was appointed Commander of the Order of the British Empire (CBE) in the 2023 Birthday Honours for services to literature and the arts. He is one of the co-founders and co-directors of the world's largest writers' festival, the annual Jaipur Literature Festival in India.

== Early life ==
William Benedict Hamilton-Dalrymple was born in Edinburgh, Scotland, on 20 March 1965 as the youngest son of Major Sir Hew Hamilton-Dalrymple, 10th Baronet (1926–2018), Lord Lieutenant of East Lothian from 1987 to 2001, and Lady Anne-Louise Keppel, a daughter of Walter Keppel, 9th Earl of Albemarle; through this line of descent he is a third cousin of Queen Camilla, both being great-great-grandchildren of William Keppel, 7th Earl of Albemarle. He is a great-nephew of the writer Virginia Woolf. His brother Jock was a first-class cricketer. Dalrymple, the youngest of four brothers, grew up in North Berwick on the shores of the Firth of Forth. He has described his childhood as being old-fashioned and "almost Edwardian". Among his forebears is a Mughal princess who married a Dalrymple ancestor.

Dalrymple was educated at Ampleforth College and Trinity College, Cambridge, where he was first a history exhibitioner and then a senior history scholar.

== Career ==
=== Curator ===
Dalrymple was the curator of Princes and Painters in Mughal Delhi 1707–1857, a major show of the late Mughal painting for the Asia Society in New York, which ran from February to May 2012. A catalogue of this exhibit co-edited by Dalrymple with Yuthika Sharma was published by Yale University Press, then later in India by Penguin, in 2012 under the same name. In 2019, he curated the exhibition of Company style painting, Forgotten Masters: Indian Painting for the East India Company, at the Wallace Collection in London.

=== Authorship ===
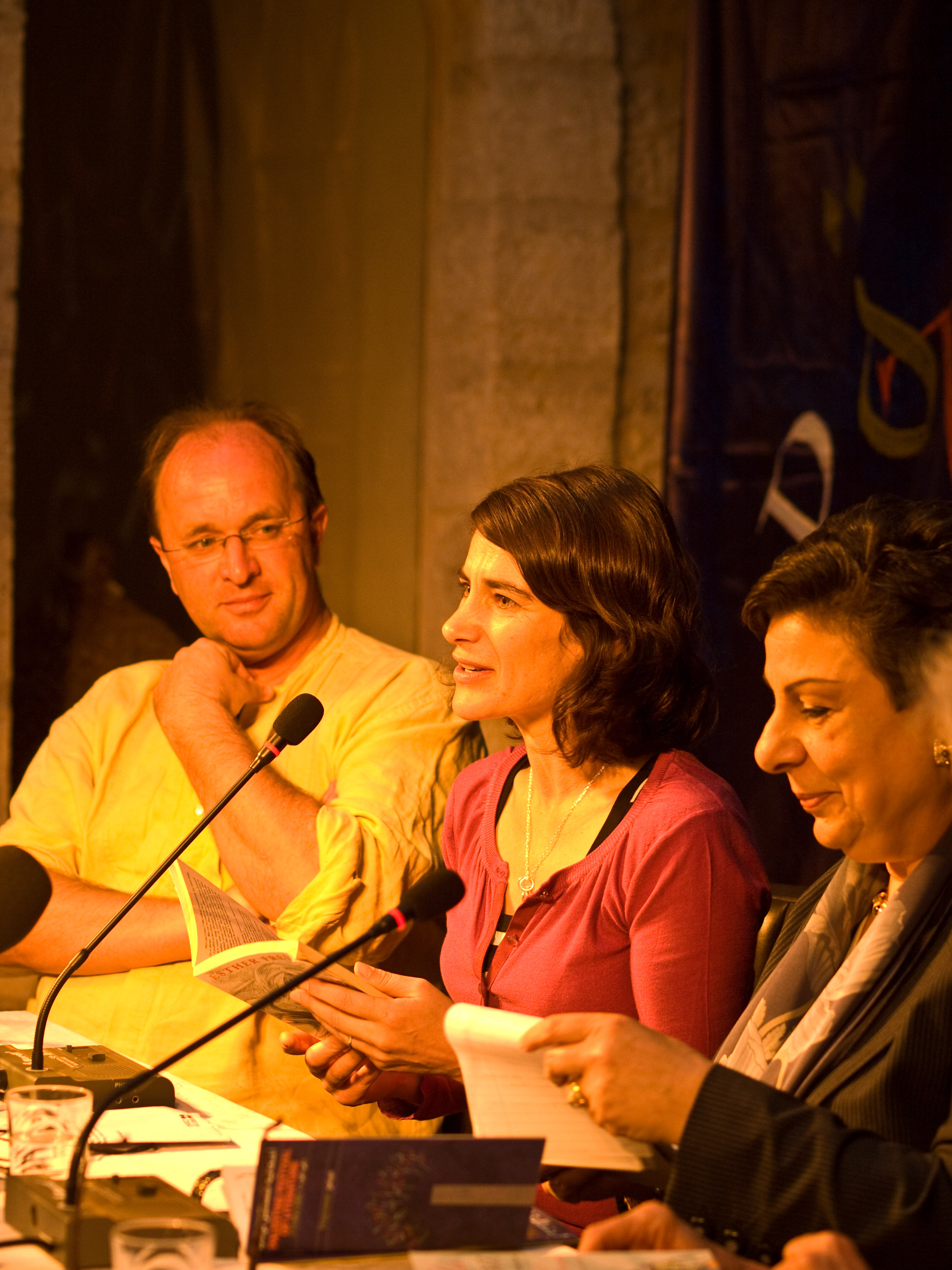
Dalrymple (left) with Esther Freud (centre) and Hanan Ashrawi at PalFest 2008

Dalrymple's interests include the history and art of India, Pakistan, Afghanistan, the Middle East, Hinduism, Buddhism, Jainism and early Eastern Christianity. Every one of his ten books have won literary prizes. His first three were travel books based on his journeys in the Middle East, India and Central Asia. His early influences include travel writers such as Robert Byron, Eric Newby and Bruce Chatwin.

Dalrymple has published a book of essays about current affairs in the Indian subcontinent, and four award-winning histories of the interaction between the East India Company and the peoples of India and Afghanistan between the eighteenth and mid-nineteenth century, his "Company Quartet". His books have been translated into more than 40 languages.

He is a regular contributor to The New York Review of Books, The Guardian, the New Statesman and The New Yorker. He has also written many articles for Time magazine. He was the Indian Subcontinent correspondent of the New Statesman from 2004 to 2014. Dalrymple covered the First and Second Intifadas as a journalist.

He attended the inaugural Palestine Festival of Literature in 2008, giving readings and presenting workshops in Jerusalem, Ramallah and Bethlehem.

His 2009 book, Nine Lives: In Search of the Sacred in Modern India, a study of some of the more esoteric forms of modern Indian, especially Hindu spirituality, was published by Bloomsbury. Like all of his other books, it went to number one on the Indian non-fiction best-seller list. After its publication he toured the UK, India, Pakistan, Bangladesh, Australia, Holland and the US with a band consisting of some of the people featured in his book including Sufis, Fakirs, Bauls and Tevaram hymn singers as well as a prison warder and part-time Theyyam dancer widely believed to incarnate the god Vishnu.

Return of a King: The Battle for Afghanistan, a history of the First Afghan War 1839–42, was published in India in December 2012, the UK in February 2013 and the US in April 2013. Dalrymple's great-great-granduncle, Colin Mackenzie, fought in the war and was briefly detained by the Afghans. Following the publication of the book Dalrymple was called to brief both the Afghan president, Hamid Karzai, and the White House on the lessons to be learned from Afghan history.

In 2019 he published The Anarchy: The Relentless Rise of the East India Company, a history of the Indian subcontinent during the period from 1739 to 1803, which saw the collapse of the Mughal imperial system, the rise of the Maratha imperial confederacy and the militarisation and rise to power of the East India Company. It was long-listed for the Baillie Gifford Prize 2019, and short-listed for the Duke of Wellington medal for Military History, the Tata Book of the Year (non-fiction) and the Historical Writers Association Book Award 2020. It was a finalist for the Cundill History Prize and won the 2020 Arthur Ross Bronze Medal from the US Council on Foreign Relations.

As of 2020 he was writing a book that is "a sweeping look at India's ideological colonisation of Asia, China and Europe during the short period between 250 BC to about 800 AD". The book was published in September 2024 and is titled The Golden Road: How Ancient India Transformed the World.

=== Jaipur Literary Festival ===
He is one of the co-founders and co-directors of the annual Jaipur Literature Festival in India, which has been called "the greatest literary show on earth".

== Scholarly reception and criticism ==
Dalrymple's oeuvre has met with mixed response by scholars. In 2005, Pankaj Mishra encouraged a revisiting of Dalrymple's White Mughal, arguing that the book inappropriately generalized from a handful of examples and risked underplaying the harms of British colonialism. Dalrymple responded defending his work, and Mishra had the final word, alleging Dalrymple produced "feel-good history".

Dalrymple's Anarchy faced a mixed reception from professional historians, with Rudrangshu Mukherjee describing it as "delightful storytelling" but objecting that "one misses the analysis". Priya Satia praised the book as a "gripping" and "epic" saga but noted that "Dalrymple’s literary commitments and tight focus on the Company constrain it from grappling fully with the realities of colonialism." In The Guardian, Maya Jasanoff described the book as an "... energetic pageturner that marches from the counting house on to the battlefield, exploding patriotic myths along the way", while Tirthankar Roy wrote in The Times Literary Supplement that "...he is a terrifically good storyteller. He makes the reader see how events unfold and observe the personalities up close. He is widely read both on the primary sources and the historical scholarship. As a result, The Anarchy is one of the best books on Indian history published in a long time." Tom Young lauded the work as "masterpiece of popular history" that falls short in its overarching argument about the relationship of state and corporation and "runs counter to much of the most exciting new research on British imperialism".

== TV, radio and podcasts ==
Dalrymple has written and presented the six-part television series Stones of the Raj (Channel 4, August 1997), the three-part Indian Journeys (BBC, August 2002) and Sufi Soul (Channel 4, Nov 2005).

The six-part Stones of the Raj documents the stories behind some of British India's colonial architecture starting with Lahore (16 August 1997), The French Connection (23 August 1997), Calcutta (30 August 1997), The Fatal Friendship (6 September 1997), Surrey in Tibet (13 September 1997), and concluded with The Magnificent Ruin (20 September 1997).

The trilogy of Indian Journeys consists of three one-hour episodes starting with Shiva's Matted Locks which, while tracing the source of the Ganga, takes Dalrymple on a journey to the Himalayas; the second part, City of Djinns, is based on his travel book of the same name, and takes a look at Delhi's history; lastly, Doubting Thomas takes Dalrymple to the Indian states of Kerala and Tamil Nadu, with which Thomas the Apostle of Jesus is closely associated.

He has done a six-part history series The Long Search for Radio 4. In this series, Dalrymple searches to discover the spiritual roots of the British Isles. Dalrymple says: "In the course of my travels I often came across the assumption that intense spirituality was somehow the preserve of what many call 'the mystic East'... it's a misconception that has always irritated me as I've always regarded our own indigenous British traditions of spirituality as especially rich."

The BBC broadcast a documentary on 3 September 2015 entitled Love and Betrayal in India: The White Mughal, based on Dalrymple's book White Mughals.

Dalrymple was the historical consultant to ITV's 2019 series Beecham House.

In 2022 Dalrymple and the journalist Anita Anand created the podcast Empire, the first series of which examines the British East India Company and British involvement and influence on India. The pair had previously collaborated on the book Koh-i-Noor: The History of the World's Most Infamous Diamond. The Empire podcast went straight to No.1 in the UK Apple Podcast charts, had more than ninety million downloads in its first two years and was twice nominated for UK Podcast of the Year in the Broadcasting Press Guild Audio Awards.

== Commentary ==
In 2024, Dalrymple criticised many Indian academic historians for failing to communicate with the public, blaming that failure for the rise of what he called "WhatsApp history" (a pejorative for simplified or distorted history spread via social media). The comment was criticised by Indian academics, who argued that Dalrymple overgeneralised and overlooked structural issues in academia other than mere communication style.

Dalrymple has been critical of Israel's actions during the Gaza war and the United Kingdom's support for Israel. In a 2024 interview with The Times, he made an analogy between Israel's response to the October 7 attacks and Britain's response to the Indian Rebellion of 1857, saying that "The Mutiny has contemporary echoes. The same feeling that innocent women and children were attacked, and that it therefore provided a carte blanche for revenge and reprisals." In May 2025, Dalrymple signed an open letter calling the Gaza war a genocide. In a September 2025 article for the New Statesman, Dalrymple argued that Britain had a historic responsibility to help establish a Palestinian state.

== Personal life ==
Dalrymple first went to Delhi on 26 January 1984, and has lived in India on and off since 1989 and spends most of the year at his Mehrauli farmhouse in the outskirts of Delhi, but summers in London and Edinburgh.

Dalrymple's wife, Olivia Fraser, is an artist and comes from a family with long-standing connections to India. The couple have three children. Their son Sam Dalrymple is a historian and a co-founder of Project Dastaan, a peace initiative. The English journalist and author Alice Albinia is his cousin. Fraser is also related to the Scottish actress Rose Leslie.

== Bibliography ==
=== Books ===
- In Xanadu: A Quest (1989)
- City of Djinns: A Year in Delhi (1994)
- From the Holy Mountain: A Journey in the Shadow of Byzantium (1997)
- The Age of Kali: Indian Travels and Encounters (1998)
- White Mughals: Love and Betrayal in Eighteenth-Century India (2002)
- The Last Mughal: The Fall of a Dynasty, Delhi, 1857 (2006)
- Nine Lives: In Search of the Sacred in Modern India. London, Bloomsbury (2009), ISBN 978-1-4088-0061-4
- Return of a King: The Battle for Afghanistan (2012), ISBN 978-1-4088-1830-5
- The Writer's Eye (2016), HarperCollins India, ISBN 978-9-3517-7925-4
- Koh-i-Noor: The History of the World's Most Infamous Diamond (2017), ISBN 978-1-63557-076-2
- The Anarchy: The Relentless Rise of the East India Company (2019), ISBN 978-1-40886-437-1
- The Golden Road: How Ancient India Transformed the World (2024), ISBN 978-1639734146

Editor

- Lonely Planet Sacred India. Lonely Planet Publications, (1999) ISBN 1740593669
- Begums, Thugs & White Mughals: The Journals of Fanny Parkes (2002)
- Princes and Painters in Mughal Delhi 1707–1857. Penguin Books India, (2012) ISBN 978-0-1434-1906-8
- Forgotten Masters: Indian Painting for the East India Company. Philip Wilson Publishers, (2020) ISBN 978-1781301012

=== Essays and reporting ===
- Dalrymple, William (29 June 2015). "The great divide: The violent legacy of Indian Partition". The New Yorker. 91 (18): 65–70. (Note: Title in the online table of contents is "The mutual genocide of Indian Partition".) (Review of the book Midnight's Furies by Nisid Hajari)

———————

== Awards and honours ==
- In Xanadu received the 1990 Yorkshire Post Best First Work Award and the Scottish Arts Council Spring Book Award.
- City of Djinns received the 1994 Thomas Cook Travel Book Award and the Sunday Times Young British Writer of the Year Award.
- Elected a Fellow of the Royal Society of Literature (FRSL) (1995)
- From the Holy Mountain received the 1997 Scottish Arts Council Autumn Book Award.
- The Age of Kali (1998) won the 2005 French Prix d'Astrolabe.
- White Mughals: Love & Betrayal in Eighteenth-Century India (2002) won the 2001 Wolfson Prize for History.
- Dalrymple was awarded the Mungo Park Medal in 2002 by the Royal Scottish Geographical Society for his outstanding contribution to travel literature.
- The television series Stones of the Raj and Indian Journeys, which Dalrymple wrote and presented, won him the Grierson Award for Best Documentary Series at BAFTA in 2002.
- The Long Search, Dalrymple's BBC Radio 4 series on the history of British spirituality and mysticism, won the 2002 Sandford St Martin Prize for Religious Broadcasting and was described by the judges as "thrilling in its brilliance...near perfect radio."
- White Mughals: Love & Betrayal in Eighteenth-Century India (2002) won the 2003 Scottish Book of the Year Prize.
- Dalrymple's article on madrasas of Pakistan was awarded the prize for Best Print Article of the Year at the 2005 FPA Media Awards.
- The Sykes Medal in 2005 from the Royal Society for Asian Affairs for his contribution "to understanding (of) contemporary Islam."
- An Honorary Doctorate of Letters, Honoris Causa, from the University of St. Andrews in 2006 "for his services to literature and international relations, to broadcasting and understanding."
- The Last Mughal won the Duff Cooper Memorial Prize for History and Biography in February 2007.
- Dalrymple received an Honorary Doctorate of Letters, Honoris Causa, from the University of Lucknow in 2007 "for his outstanding contribution in literature and history."
- The Last Mughal won the 2007 Vodafone Crossword Book Award for best work in English non-fiction.
- An Honorary Doctorate of Letters, Honoris Causa, from the University of Aberdeen (2008).
- The 2008 Colonel James Tod Award given by the Maharana Mewar Foundation for achieving excellence in his field.
- Nine Lives received the 2010 Asia House Award for Asian Literature.
- The Media Citizen Puraskar by the Indian Confederation of NGOs for emphasising as an author issues of global importance and concern.
- Honorary Doctorate from the University of Bradford for his contributions to creative writing, literature and the Indian Subcontinent history fields (2012).
- Honorary Doctorate of Letters from the University of Edinburgh.
- The 2015 Hemingway Prize for Return of a King.
- The 2015 Kapuściński Prize for Return of a King.
- Elected a Corresponding Fellow of the Royal Society of Edinburgh (FRSE).
- He was awarded the President's Medal of the British Academy "for his literary achievements and for co-founding Jaipur Literary Festival".
- He was awarded the 2022 Minerva Medal of the Royal Philosophical Society of Glasgow for his contribution to the writing of history.
- Elected a Fellow of the Royal Historical Society (FRHistS).
- Honorary Doctorate of Letters from the University of York (2023).
- Elected Honorary Fellow of the Association of Scottish Literature (2024)

== See also ==
- Yvonne, Lady Cochrane
