= The Bear Deluxe =

American environmental literary magazine

The Bear Deluxe issue 25, fall 2007.

The Bear Deluxe is a Portland, Oregon-based magazine dedicated to environmental writing, literature, and visual art. The magazine was established by Orlo, a non-profit in 1992. It is released by Orlo. The magazine is published on a biannual basis.

The Bear Deluxe has received grants from the Oregon Arts Commission, the Regional Arts & Culture Council, and the Oregon Cultural Trust.

The magazine sponsors the Doug Fir, an annual fiction award. Past judges of Doug Fir have included Katherine Dunn, Rivka Galchen, Brian Doyle, and Jonathan Raymond.

Writing from The Bear Deluxe has been reprinted in Utne Reader.

Thomas "Tom" Webb is The Bear Deluxe's co-founder and current editor-in-chief.

The magazine was previously called The Bear Essential.

== See also ==
- List of literary magazines
- List of art magazines
