= Kabugi =

Kabugi is a surname. Notable people with the surname include:

- Brian Kabugi (born 2000), Kenyan actor
- Gitonga Kabugi, Kenyan politician
