= Brian Lewis =

Brian Lewis may refer to:

- Brian Lewis, 2nd Baron Essendon (1903–1978), British motor-racing driver
- Brian Lewis (architect) (1906–1991), professor of architecture at the University of Melbourne
- Brian Lewis (illustrator) (1929–1978), British science fiction illustrator and comics artist
- Brian Lewis (politician) (born 1936), Canadian politician in the Northwest Territories government
- Brian Lewis (footballer) (1943–1998), English footballer
- Brian Lewis (cricketer) (born 1945), Welsh cricketer
- Brian Lewis (PR executive) (born 1958), former vice-president of Fox News
- Brian Lewis (sailor) (born 1942), Australian Olympic sailor
- Brian Lewis (sprinter) (born 1974), American Olympic athlete
- Brian J. Lewis (1929–2001), American politician
- Brian Lewis (historian), British historian
- Brian "The Professor" Lewis, host of the channel Tolarian Community College

== See also ==
- Bryan Lewis (born 1942), Canadian municipal politician and former NHL referee
- Bryan Lewis, American Trump aide
