= Ryan Scott =

Ryan Scott may refer to:

- Ryan Scott (cricketer)
- Ryan Scott (footballer, born 1976), English football goalkeeper
- Ryan Scott (soccer, born 1995), Australian football goalkeeper
- Ryan Scott (sprinter) (born 1987), English sprinter
- Ryan Scott (wheelchair rugby) (born 1982), Australian Paralympic wheelchair rugby player

== See also ==
- Ryan St. Anne Scott (born 1953), self-proclaimed American traditionalist Catholic priest
- Bryan Scott (born 1981), American football player
- Brian Scott (disambiguation)
