= Brian Turner =

Brian Turner may refer to:

- Brian Turner (American poet) (born 1967), American poet, essayist, and professor
- Brian Turner (New Zealand poet) (1944–2025), New Zealand poet and field hockey player
- Brian Turner (drummer), drummer for the Seattle-based band Schoolyard Heroes
- Brian Turner (chef) (born 1946), British celebrity chef
- Brian Turner (footballer, born 1930), Australian footballer for Richmond
- Brian Turner (footballer, born 1933) (1933–2024), Australian footballer for Collingwood and North Melbourne
- Brian Turner (footballer, born 1936) (1936–1999), English football (soccer) player
- Brian Turner (footballer, born 1949), New Zealand international football (soccer) player
- Brian Turner (soccer, born 1952) (1952–2010), Australian football (soccer) player
- Brian Turner (cricketer) (1938–2015), played cricket for Yorkshire CCC
- B. Kevin Turner (born 1964/65), American businessman at Wal-Mart and Microsoft
- Brian Turner (politician), Member of the North Carolina House of Representatives

== See also ==
- Bryan Turner (disambiguation)
