= Last Call with Carson Daly =

Television talk show

- The show's former logo
- Written by: Brett Webster
- Directed by: Rich Bond; Michael A. Hammeke; Joe LaMattina
- Presented by: Carson Daly
- Country of origin: United States
- Original language: English
- No. of seasons: 18
- No. of episodes: 2,000

Production
- Executive producers: Stewart Bailey; Carson Daly; Rich Bond
- Production location: Los Angeles
- Editors: Samantha Babcock; Karen Erickson; Josh Gohlke; Steve Gutierrez; Joe LaMattina; Chris Otwell; Ken Peters; Jack Wallis; Marty Watts
- Running time: 29 minutes
- Production companies: NBC Studios (2002–2004); NBC Universal Television Studio (2004–2007); Universal Media Studios (2007–2011); Universal Television (2011–2019); Carson Daly Productions

Original release
- Network: NBC; CNBC
- Release: January 8, 2002 – May 24, 2019

Last Call with Carson Daly is an American late-night talk show that aired on NBC from January 8, 2002 to May 24, 2019. Hosted by former MTV personality Carson Daly, the half-hour program—which aired Monday through Friday nights (early Tuesday through Saturday mornings) at 1:37 a.m. Eastern Time, replacing the similarly interview-focused talk show Later and, upon expanding to five nights a week in May 2002, the weekly stand-up comedy showcase Late Friday in the slot—was initially formatted as a more conventional late-night talk program in line with The Tonight Show and Late Night, albeit without the topical comedic monologues, recurring comedy bits or house band typical of the format. These elements would be incorporated into the show in 2005, coinciding with the show’s relocation from NBC’s Rockefeller Plaza studio in New York City to NBC Studios in Burbank.

In 2009, Last Call abandoned its studio-based format, and was retooled as an entertainment program featuring interviews and performances (such as music and stand-up comedy) filmed on-location with Daly. Unlike NBC’s other late-night programs (except for Saturday Night Live), following the switch to the documentary-style on-location format, Last Call typically recorded only 24 weeks of original episodes per year, with the rest of the year being taken up by reruns.

In 2013, NBC announced that Daly would leave Last Call to become a correspondent for its morning show, Today. Despite this, the show continued with Daly appearing in a reduced capacity, serving only as a studio-based presenter for the segments (with interviews conducted by production staff off-camera). In February 2019, NBC announced that the show would conclude after its 2,000th and final episode, which aired on May 25, 2019. Reruns continued until mid-September, with its replacement—A Little Late with Lilly Singh—premiering in its timeslot on September 16, 2019.

== History ==
=== Development (2001–2002) ===
On August 15, 2001, Daly signed a three-year deal with NBC Studios to host and develop programs for the NBC network; under that agreement, NBC initially announced that Daly would be the new host of Later, which the network canceled in December 2000, amid continuing declining ratings into the relatively short tenure of host Cynthia Garrett (who, nearly a year earlier, became the program’s first permanent host since Greg Kinnear departed in 1996 to focus on his acting career). Daly’s contract with NBC allowed him to continue his role as host of the MTV music video countdown show Total Request Live (then produced at the channel’s One Astor Plaza studios in Times Square); as such, production of the relaunched Later was to relocate from NBC Studios in Burbank, California to Studio 8H at the GE Building in New York City, which also served the home studio of Saturday Night Live as well as the studio where Later was taped from its premiere in August 1988 until original host Bob Costas left the program in 1994.

However by December 2001, as the new format was being finalized ahead of Daly taking over the time slot the following month, the network decided to retire the Later name and instead launch Daly’s program as an entirely new show. Daly and executive producer David Friedman came up with the new title, Last Call (a play on the announcement informing late-night bar patrons of the final sale of alcoholic beverages shortly before closing), during a late-night idea session at a New York tavern. Regarding the decision to develop it as a new program rather than a continuation of Later, Friedman stated, “It wasn’t an easy decision since ‘Later With Bob Costas’ is a show that we hope one day we could be like. But since it’s been many moons since that incarnation, we decided it was time to start something new and fresh.”

=== Early format (2002–2005) ===
Last Call premiered on January 8, 2002; the show’s premiere was delayed by one day at the last minute due to a contract dispute, with a rerun of the Canadian sketch comedy series SCTV (which NBC had been airing under the Later banner as a placeholder since Garrett’s tenure and the show’s interview format as a whole ended in January 2001) airing in its place on January 7, its originally scheduled premiere date. Daly’s guests for his first week as host were Alicia Keys, Death Row Records founder Marion “Suge” Knight, Gwyneth Paltrow and Jon Stewart. Last Call initially aired Monday through Thursday nights (early Tuesday through Friday mornings) until the cancellation of the weekly stand-up comedy showcase Late Friday, which had occupied the Friday 1:35 a.m. ET timeslot in some capacity since it premiered as the music video showcase Friday Night Videos in July 1983, in late May 2002; the network decided to add a Friday night (Saturday morning) edition of Last Call on May 31, 2002, expanding the program to five nights a week.

As Last Call shared Studio 8H with Saturday Night Live, the producers had to work around the variety show’s production schedule. During this period, Last Call did not have a house band nor did it feature a monologue or comedy bits, going straight to the first guest at the beginning of the show, similar to the format of predecessor Later. The stage was set up in an empty black box theater style, save for two low-slung chairs and a small table. Each week, a different unsigned band was brought in to do the music, in addition to any musical act at the end. Gradually, the set acquired more furnishings and decor, much of which was influenced by the occasional week-long trips to Las Vegas. In 2003 and 2004, Last Call was nominated for a Teen Choice Award for "Choice TV Show – Late Night".

=== Relocation to Burbank; Writers Strike dispute (2005–2009) ===
Last Call was originally planned to broadcast in high-definition when Studio 8H was retrofitted for Saturday Night Live; however, instead, the show was relocated to Los Angeles in September 2005, and continued to air in standard-definition. After the move, Last Call began to resemble its counterparts, with a more traditional set, permanent house band led by Joe Firstman, short monologue and occasional comedy bits. In November 2005, Firstman became the official house band leader for Last Call. Notable members of his band include Kamasi Washington, Thundercat, Kenny Aronoff, Mike Miley (Rival Sons), Brian Wright, Zane Musa, Zane Carney, Mark Bryan, Marc Ford, and Ryan Porter. Firstman wrote the majority of the material the band performed.

Production of new Last Call episodes was suspended for a month due to the Writers Guild of America strike; however on December 4, 2007, Last Call became the first late night talk show to resume production during the strike. On air, Daly explained that the only reason the show resumed production was that he was given the option to either return or have the show's 75 non-striking staff members fired. The shows were not scripted and did not include monologues. The Writers Guild of America (WGA) was critical of Daly, accusing him of crossing picket lines and labeling him a scab. Daly is not a member of the WGA.

On November 27, 2007, Daly was accused by the WGA of soliciting jokes for his show through a telephone hotline. On December 11, 2007, an organized group of WGA writers attended a taping of Last Call. First, one was disrupted during an interview with Jerry Rice. After security removed the first writer, another spoke up disruptively, expressing sympathy with striking writers. A producer asked anyone planning to disrupt the show to leave or face prosecution; between five and twenty left.

=== Switch to documentary-style format (2009–2019) ===
As the end of Late Night with Conan O'Brien was approaching, Daly made it public that he was interested in moving to the Late Night time slot. Jimmy Fallon was chosen to replace O'Brien, a choice that executive producer Lorne Michaels had in mind dating back to the day that Fallon left Saturday Night Live in 2004.

In February 2009, network executive Rick Ludwin told TV Week that the company was currently "going through the budgetary process with all of our shows. There are new budgetary realities... It's tough. We want to keep [Carson] going as long as we can make the budget work." Soon after that interview, NBC announced plans for Last Call to go on a one-week "tour" of California, with taped segments of up-and-coming musical acts at various clubs, such as The Roxy, The Viper Room, and Hotel Cafe. As the show's 1000th episode approached in April, NBC's summary of the show made it clear that the change in format would continue:

"Currently in its eighth season, NBC's Last Call with Carson Daly utilizes a new style by introducing a documentary style format. Host Carson Daly gets out of the studio and takes the show on location each night. Recent highlights include Daly’s motorcycle trip across the historic Route 66, a visit to comedian Tom Green's house in the Hollywood Hills, and a scene at the Whiskey Bar with the Grammy Award-winning band Kings of Leon."

With the change, the usual late-night talk show trappings of a house band, studio audience, and comedy were abandoned. In May, NBC announced that Last Call had been renewed for a ninth season, which debuted on September 21, 2009.

On January 8, 2010, it was reported by multiple media outlets that The Jay Leno Show was moving to 11:35 p.m., the Conan O'Brien-hosted Tonight Show to 12:05 a.m., and Late Night with Jimmy Fallon to 1:05, which would have resulted in Last Call losing its time slot (as NBC did not include plans to move Poker After Dark, at the time the show which followed Last Call in some markets, to a later slot). NBC confirmed the move, along with the possible end of Last Call. NBC had repeatedly emphasized that its focus is retaining the lineup of Leno, Tonight and Fallon. NBC chairman Jeff Gaspin told ABC News he expected Daly to stay with the network "in some fashion", but did not elaborate.

On January 9, after the lineup changes were first rumored in the press, Daly made an unannounced stop on Jimmy Kimmel Live!, appearing from the crowd during an audience Q&A session with Kimmel. Daly jokingly asked, "What will happen to my show?" Referencing the contestant elimination process on the show Survivor, Kimmel responded, "As long as you have your immunity idol, I think you're safe." Daly then asked, "Can I have your show?" Kimmel responded, "No." After O'Brien was effectively forced to leave NBC and Leno was subsequently re-installed as host of The Tonight Show, Daly remained at his spot and received a 4% surge in ratings. On August 19, 2010, NBC and Daly confirmed that Last Call with Carson Daly would be renewed for its tenth season. During the 2011 May sweeps period, Last Call received a 5% increase in viewership compared to the previous year. In the same month, next day encores of the series began to air as part of Fuse's early primetime schedule.

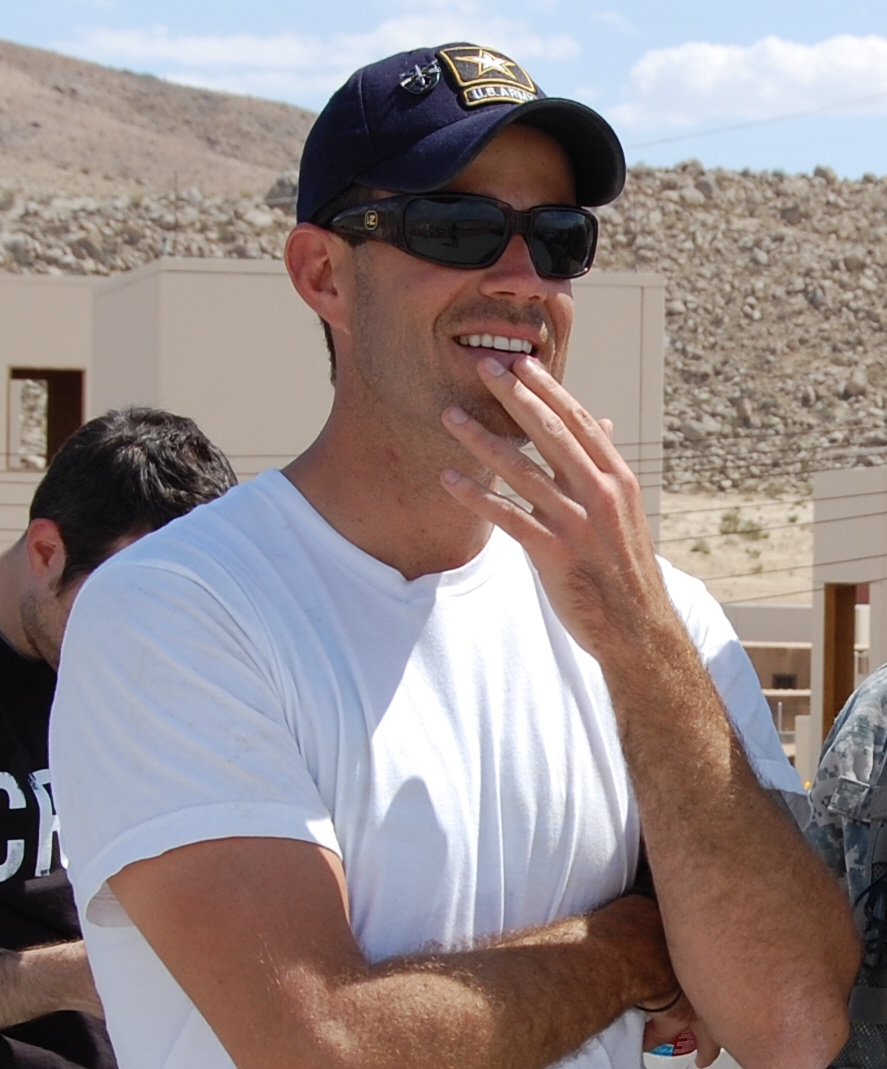
Carson Daly

Despite the program being filmed in widescreen since at least 2008, Last Call was still presented in a 4:3 letterboxed format until September 19, 2011, when it became the last program (outside of the network's outside-controlled Saturday morning Qubo block at the time) on NBC's schedule to make the full conversion to high definition. This also made it the last of the major late night talk programs on broadcast and cable to make the switch. On April 3, 2013, NBC officially announced that Jimmy Fallon would succeed Jay Leno as the host of The Tonight Show following the 2014 Winter Olympics. Daly was again passed over for host of Late Night when Seth Meyers was announced as Fallon's successor on May 12, 2013.

In September 2013, NBC announced that Daly was leaving Last Call to become the new social media correspondent for its morning show Today. Despite this, Daly remained involved in a limited capacity for the 13th season, only filming opening and closing segments for the program. All interviews were now conducted by the show's producers off-camera. Though there was originally talk of expanding Fallon's Tonight Show to 90 minutes which would have bumped Last Call to 2:00 a.m. or possibly have resulted in its cancellation, the change of late night time slots did not come to pass and the show's start time remained unchanged.

=== Cancellation ===
By the time the series entered its 17th season in September 2018, Last Call had become the longest-running American weeknight late-night television program with the same host. At the start of this season, Jameela Jamil (who also co-starred in the NBC sitcom The Good Place beginning that season) began hosting a recurring segment on the show, Wide Awake with Jameela Jamil.

On February 12, 2019, NBC announced the series would end near the official conclusion of the 2018–19 television season, with Daly citing his more prominent workload with Today, The Voice, and a new project he was developing for Golf Channel in his decision to leave the program. The 2,000th and final episode of Last Call aired on May 25, 2019, with repeats continuing until September 12, 2019. On March 14, 2019, NBC announced that Canadian YouTube personality Lilly Singh would host a new talk show to replace Last Call, A Little Late with Lilly Singh.
