= Bryan Turner =

Bryan Turner may refer to:

- Bryan Turner (businessman), Canadian music industry executive and film producer
- Bryan Turner (sociologist) (born 1945), British and Australian sociologist
- Bryan M. Turner, British professor of genetics in Birmingham
