= Brian Harvey (disambiguation) =

Brian Harvey (born 1974) is a British pop and dance music singer.

Brian or Bryan Harvey may also refer to:

- Brian Harvey (Australian athlete) (born 1965), Australian Paralympic athlete in discus and javelin
- Brian Harvey (American runner), American distance runner
- Bryan Harvey (born 1963), baseball player
- Bryan Harvey (musician) (1956–2006), American musician with House of Freaks
- Brian Harvey (lecturer) (born 1949), computer programmer and lecturer at Berkeley
- Bryan Harvey (footballer) (1938–2006), English footballer
- Brian Harvey (footballer, born 1947), English association footballer
- Brian Harvey (Australian rules footballer) (born 1949), Australian rules footballer
- Brian Harvey (author) (born 1953), Irish space-history author
- Brian Harvey (priest) (1916–2005), Dean of Ossory
- Brian Harvey, ex-drummer of Virginia grindcore band Pig Destroyer
