= Brian Stack =

Brian Stack may refer to:

- Brian Stack (comedian) (born 1964), American actor, comedian, and writer
- Brian P. Stack (born 1966), New Jersey senator
- Brian Stack (prison officer) (1935/36–1984), shot by the IRA

== See also ==
- Brian Stock (born 1981), footballer
- Brian Sack (born 1968), American writer and actor
