= Brian Woods =

Brian Woods may refer to:

- Brian Woods (filmmaker) (born 1963), British documentary filmmaker
- Brian Woods (darts player) (born 1966), English darts player

== See also ==
- Brian Wood (disambiguation)
- Bryan Woods, one-half of the filmmaking duo Scott Beck and Bryan Woods
