= Brian Martin =

Brian Martin may refer to:

- Brian Martin (basketball) (1962–2025), American basketball player
- Brian Martin (footballer, born 1963), Scottish footballer (Motherwell FC, national team)
- Brian Martín (footballer, born 1996), Spanish footballer
- Brian Martin (luger) (born 1974), American luger
- Brian Martin (social scientist) (born 1947), professor at the University of Wollongong in Australia
- Brian Frank Martin (1936–2023), Chief Justice of the Supreme Court of the Northern Territory, Australia, 1993–2003
- Brian Lansing Martin, American convicted murderer
- Brian Ross Martin (born 1947), Chief Justice of the Supreme Court of the Northern Territory, Australia, 2004–2010
- Brian J. Martin, American political figure who served as Mayor and City Manager of Lowell, Massachusetts

== See also ==
- Bryan Martyn (1930–2002), Australian rules footballer
