= Brian Francis (artist) =

Irish artist

- Born: Brian Francis Fanning; 1933; County Kerry, Ireland
- Died: 2005 (aged 71–72)
- Known for: painter

Brian Francis Fanning (1933–2005), who signed his name Brian Francis, was a 20th-century Irish artist working in oils and distemper, primarily on landscapes.

He was born in Tralee, in County Kerry, but spent most summers in Birr, County Tipperary, where the family had connections to the Midland Tribune newspaper.

He saw his first fine art in magazines sent from England by relatives. He preserved many such pictures. He frequently cycled to Limerick to visit art exhibitions and his uncle, an art tutor at the Limerick School of Art.

As a teen he designed and made sets, masks and costumes for the local amateur drama group in Tralee. He planned and ran the lighting on performance nights. He was an active member of the Music Association in Tralee. He applied to the Central College of Art in London, and was accepted on the strength of his drawings. He had exceptional talent as a draughtsman and studied Fine Art painting and printmaking.

When he left for London, Rose, his wife-to-be, followed him. They were married in a Southwark church. After studying part-time the need to earn a living for his new family became too demanding and he was forced to give up his studies. The family returned to Ireland in 1973.

He continued to paint. He exhibited rarely but had private followers in Ireland and the UK. During this time he had paintings accepted to the prestigious RHA Summer Exhibitions in 1988 and 1993. He died just as he neared the completion of a set of works intended for a solo exhibition.

== Practice ==
He researched his paintings sitting in fields and graveyards with his sketchbook and watercolours, then finished the works on a painter's easel at home.

He worked primarily in oils and distemper (which was unusual for the times), but allowed him to achieve the palette that he needed. He worked mostly on board rather than canvas. He was influenced by the works of Morandi and the theories of colour psychology. He was interested in popular science and natural history and had an extensive library of these as well as art topics.

== Provenance ==
- Included in the 'Off the Wall' Exhibition (Morgan O'Driscoll) 2014 (Posthumously)
- Exhibited in the People's Art Exhibition, St Stephens Green, Dublin 2004
- Exhibited Royal Hibernian Academy in the 163rd Summer Exhibition 1993.
- Exhibited Royal Hibernian Academy in the 158th Summer Exhibition 1988
- Held in the public collection of the Department of Economics of University College Cork.
- Work held in private collections in Ireland and the UK

He was contemporary to William Crozier, Tony O'Malley, Charles Brady, Markey Robinson, Patrick Scott and Sean Scully.
