= Brian Francis =

Brian Francis may refer to:

- Brian Francis (writer) (born 1971), Canadian writer
- Brian Francis (artist) (1933–2005), Irish artist
- Brian Francis (politician) (born 1957), Mi'kmaq leader and Canadian senator
