= Brian Meyer =

Brian Meyer can refer to:

- Brian Meyer (baseball)
- Brian Meyer (politician)

== See also ==
- Brian Myers (disambiguation)
