= Brian Flynn =

Brian Flynn may refer to:

- Brian Flynn (footballer) (born 1955), Welsh football manager
- Brian Flynn (baseball) (born 1990), American baseball player
- Brian Flynn (cricketer) (1929–1986), Australian cricketer
- Brian Flynn (ice hockey) (born 1988), American ice hockey player
- Brian Flynn, lead vocalist with the American country rock band Flynnville Train
- Brian Patrick Flynn (born 1976), American interior designer and television personality
