= Bryan Thompson =

Bryan Thompson may refer to:

- Bryan Thompson (American football), (born 1999), American football player
- Bryan Thompson (designer) (born 1974), American automotive designer
- Bryan Thompson (rower), Canadian lightweight rower

== See also ==
- Brian Thompson (disambiguation), multiple people
