= Brian Magee (disambiguation) =

Brian Magee (born 1975) is a Northern Irish former professional boxer.

Brian Magee may also refer to:

- Brian Magee (cricketer) (1918–2006), Canadian cricketer
- Bryan Magee, (1930–2019), British philosopher and politician

== See also ==
- Brian McGee (disambiguation)
