= Brian Edwards =

Brian or Bryan Edwards may refer to:

== Sports ==
- Bryan Edwards (American football) (born 1998), American football wide receiver
- Bryan Edwards (Australian footballer) (born 1957), Australian rules footballer
- Bryan Edwards (footballer, born 1930) (1930–2016), English footballer and manager
- Brian Edwards (soccer) (born 1984), American soccer player

== Others ==
- Brian Edwards (broadcaster) (born 1937), Irish-born New Zealand media personality and author
- Bryan Edwards (judge) (fl. 1855), Jamaican Chief Justice
- Bryan Edwards (politician) (1743–1800), British politician and planter
- Brian Morgan Edwards (1934–2002), Welsh businessman and politician
- Brian T. Edwards, American scholar
