= Brian Wright =

Brian Wright may refer to:

- Brian Wright (American football) (born 1960), American football coach and player
- Brian Wright (musician), American recording artist on Sugar Hill Records
- Brian Wright (rugby league) (born 1935), Australian rugby league player
- Brian Wright (Scottish footballer) (born 1958), Scottish former football player and manager
- Brian Wright (Canadian soccer) (born 1995), Canadian soccer player
- Brian Wright (table tennis) (born 1943), English table tennis international
- Brian Wright (writer) (1918–2013), Australian writer, producer, and director
- Brian Wright (basketball) (born 1983), general manager of the San Antonio Spurs
- Brian Brendan Wright (born c. 1947), Irish criminal involved in fixing horse races and drug trafficking

== See also ==
- Bryant Wright (21st century), American evangelical minister
