= Brian Keenan =

Brian Keenan may refer to:

- Brian Keenan (Irish republican) (1941–2008), Provisional Irish Republican Army member
- Brian Keenan (musician, born 1943) (1943–1985), American musician
- Brian Keenan (musician, born 1982), American musician
- Brian Keenan (writer) (born 1950), Belfast writer held as a hostage in Lebanon from 1986 to 1990
