= Michael E. Newcomb =

American clinical psychologist

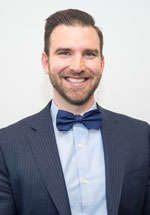
- Education: Northwestern University (B.A.); University of Illinois at Chicago (M.A., Ph.D.)
- Scientific career
- Fields: Clinical psychology; Mental health; LGBTQ psychology
- Workplaces: Feinberg School of Medicine
- Thesis: Developmental and Racial Differences in a Situational Model of Sexual Risk in Men Who Have Sex With Men (2012)
- Doctoral advisor: Brian Mustanski

Michael E. Newcomb is an American clinical psychologist. His researched focuses on health disparities in LGBT youth, HIV/AIDS, and mental health problems. He is an assistant professor at Northwestern University's Feinberg School of Medicine in the Department of Medical Social Sciences.

== Education ==
Michael E. Newcomb was born to Walter and Kathleen Newcomb. He has a brother, Robert who is also a doctor. Newcomb earned a Bachelor of Arts degree from Northwestern University in 2004. He attended University of Illinois at Chicago where he completed a Master of Arts degree in 2009. His master's thesis was titled Internalized homophobia and internalizing mental health problems: A meta-analytic review. He did a pre-doctoral internships in clinical psychology at Massachusetts General Hospital and behavioral medicine at Harvard Medical School. Newcomb earned a Doctor of Philosophy in Psychology from the same institution in 2012. His doctoral advisor was Brian Mustanski. Robin Mermelstein was the chair of Newcomb's defense committee along with members Jon Kassel, Stewart Shankman, and Christian Grov. His dissertation was titled Developmental and Racial Differences in a Situational Model of Sexual Risk in Men Who Have Sex With Men.

== Career ==
Newcomb is a clinical psychologist. He is an assistant professor at Northwestern University's Feinberg School of Medicine in the Department of Medical Social Sciences. His researched focuses on health disparities in LGBT youth, HIV/AIDS, and mental health problems. He is the Associate Director of Scientific Development for the Northwestern Institute for Sexual and Gender Minority Health and Welling (ISGMH). Newcomb is the principal investigator for a NIH R01 grant through the National Institute on Alcohol Abuse and Alcoholism. He is a co-principal investigator with Mustanski of a R01 from National Institute on Minority Health and Health Disparities.

== Selected works ==
- Newcomb, M. E.; Mustanski, B. (December 1, 2010). "Internalized homophobia and internalizing mental health problems: A meta-analytic review". Clinical Psychology Review. 30 (8): 1019–1029. doi:10.1016/j.cpr.2010.07.003. PMID 20708315.
- Newcomb, Michael E.; Mustanski, Brian (November 4, 2009). "Moderators of the Relationship Between Internalized Homophobia and Risky Sexual Behavior in Men Who Have Sex with Men: A Meta-Analysis". Archives of Sexual Behavior. 40 (1): 189–199. doi:10.1007/s10508-009-9573-8. PMID 19888643. S2CID 25461697.
- Newcomb, Michael E.; Clerkin, Elise M.; Mustanski, Brian (October 20, 2010). "Sensation Seeking Moderates the Effects of Alcohol and Drug Use Prior to Sex on Sexual Risk in Young Men Who Have Sex with Men". AIDS and Behavior. 15 (3): 565–575. doi:10.1007/s10461-010-9832-7. PMID 20960048. S2CID 1406469.
