= Brian McGee =

Brian McGee may refer to:

- Brian McGee (bishop) (born 1965), Scottish Roman Catholic prelate, bishop of Argyll and the Isles (since 2016)
- Brian McGee (drummer) (born 1959), Scottish drummer with the bands Simple Minds, Engames and Propaganda
- Brian McGee, American singer and guitarist of Plow United

== See also ==
- Brian Magee (disambiguation)
