= Brian Green =

Brian Green may refer to:

- Brian Green (footballer) (1935–2012), British football (soccer) coach
- Brian Green (athlete) (born 1941), British sprinter
- Brian Green (author) (born 1951), pseudonym used by American author Orson Scott Card
- Brian Green (barrister) (born 1956), British barrister
- Brian Green (baseball), (born c. 1972), American baseball coach
- Brian Green (game developer) (1973–2020), American game developer
- Brian Green (chemist) (1933–2021), English mass spectrometrist
- Brian Austin Green (born 1973), American actor
- Brian Lane Green (born 1962), American stage actor
- Brian Green (Torchwood), a character from the British TV show Torchwood

== See also ==
- Brian Greene (born 1963), American physicist
- Brian Greene (politician), American state legislator in Utah
- Brian Greene (American football) (born 1972), American football player
- Bryan Green (born 1957), Australian politician
- Bryan Green (priest) (1901–1993), author and priest
