= Brian McMahon =

Brian McMahon may refer to:

- Brian McMahon (rowing) (born 1961), Canadian coxswain
- Brian McMahon (hurler), former Irish hurler
- Brian McMahon (footballer) (born 1939), former Australian rules footballer
- Brian McMahon (New Zealand Army officer) (1929–2025), New Zealand Army doctor
- Barney McMahon (Brian McMahon, 1928–2010), Irish Air Corps commander 1984–1989

== See also ==
- Brien McMahon (1903–1952), American lawyer and politician
- Bryan McMahon, see Rossington Main Novices' Hurdle
- Brian MacMahon (disambiguation)
