= Bryan Fletcher =

Bryan Fletcher may refer to:

- Bryan Fletcher (rugby league) (born 1974), Australian former rugby league footballer
- Bryan Fletcher (American football) (born 1979), American football player
- Bryan Fletcher (skier) (born 1986), American Nordic combined skier

== See also ==
- Brian Fletcher (disambiguation)
