= Brian Doyle =

Brian Doyle may refer to:

- Brian J. Doyle (born 1950), former press secretary of the US Department of Homeland Security
- Brian Doyle (baseball) (born 1954), former Major League Baseball infielder
- Brian Doyle (Canadian writer) (1935–2026), Canadian writer of children's literature
- Brian Doyle (rower) (1930–2008), Australian rower who competed in the 1956 Summer Olympics
- Brian Doyle (footballer) (1930–1992), footballer and manager
- Brian Doyle (Wexford hurler) (born 1991), Irish hurler for Shelmaliers and Wexford
- Brian Doyle (Carlow hurler) (born 1989), Irish hurler for Erin's Own and Carlow
- Brian André Doyle (1911–2004), solicitor-general of Fiji, 1948–1951
- Brian Doyle (rugby union) (born 1984), American rugby union player
- Brian Doyle (American writer) (1956–2017), American writer and editor of Portland Magazine
- Brian Doyle, Canadian criminal convicted for the murder of Catherine Carroll

== See also ==
- Brian Doyle-Murray (born 1945), comedian and actor
- Bryan Doyle (born 1963), Australian politician
- Bryan Doyle (cricketer) (born 1968), Australian former cricketer
