= Brian Bennett (disambiguation) =

Brian Bennett (born 1940) is a British musician, best known as drummer with The Shadows.

Brian or Bryan Bennett may also refer to:

- Brian Bennett (footballer) (1938–2025), Australian rules footballer
- Brian Bennett (diplomat) (born 1948), British diplomat
- Bryan Bennett (born 1992), American football player
- Brian Bennett (cricketer) (born 2003), Zimbabwean cricketer
