= Bryan Young =

Bryan Young may refer to:

- Bryan Young (politician) (1800–1882), Whig U.S. Representative from Kentucky
- Bryan Young (cricketer) (born 1964), New Zealand cricketer
- Bryan Young (bassoonist) (born 1974), American bassoonist and technology entrepreneur
- Bryan Young (filmmaker) (born 1980), American filmmaker, author and blogger
- Bryan Young (rugby union) (born 1981), Irish rugby union footballer
- Bryan Young (ice hockey) (born 1986), Canadian ice hockey defenceman

== See also ==
- Brian Young (disambiguation)
