= Bryan Reynolds =

Bryan Reynolds may refer to:

- Bryan Reynolds (scholar) (born 1965), American critical theorist, performance theorist, Shakespeare scholar, playwright, director
- Bryan Reynolds (baseball) (born 1995), American baseball outfielder
- Bryan Reynolds (soccer) (born 2001), American soccer player

== See also ==
- Brian Reynolds (disambiguation)
