= Brian Cox =

Brian or Bryan Cox may refer to:

== Media and entertainment ==
- Brian Cox (actor) (born 1946), Scottish actor
- Brian Cox (director) (1955–2019), American film director
- Brian Cox (physicist) (born 1968), English physicist, broadcaster, and former keyboard player
- Brian Cox (special effects artist), American special effects artist
- Bryan-Michael Cox (born 1977), American songwriter and record producer

== Sports ==
- Brian Cox (footballer) (born 1961), English goalkeeper
- Brian Cox (American football) (fl. 1985–2006), American football coach
- Brian Cox (rugby league), Australian rugby league footballer
- Brian Cox (rugby union) (1928–2015), Australian rugby union player
- Bryan Cox (born 1968), American football coach and former player
- Bryan Cox Jr. (born 1994), American football defensive end

== Other people ==
- Brian Cox (poet) (1928–2008), English scholar, editor of Critical Quarterly and author of the Black Papers
