= Bryan Miller =

Bryan Miller may refer to:

- Bryan Q. Miller, American television and comic writer
- Bryan Miller (ice hockey) (born 1983), American ice hockey player
- Bryan Miller (athlete) (born 1989), American sprinter
- Bryan E. Miller (born 1965), American film composer, pianist, and music producer
- Bryan Patrick Miller (born 1972), American serial killer

== See also ==
- Brian Miller (disambiguation)
- Zell Bryan Miller (1932–2018), American author and politician
