= Jon Hawkins (Utah politician) =

American politician

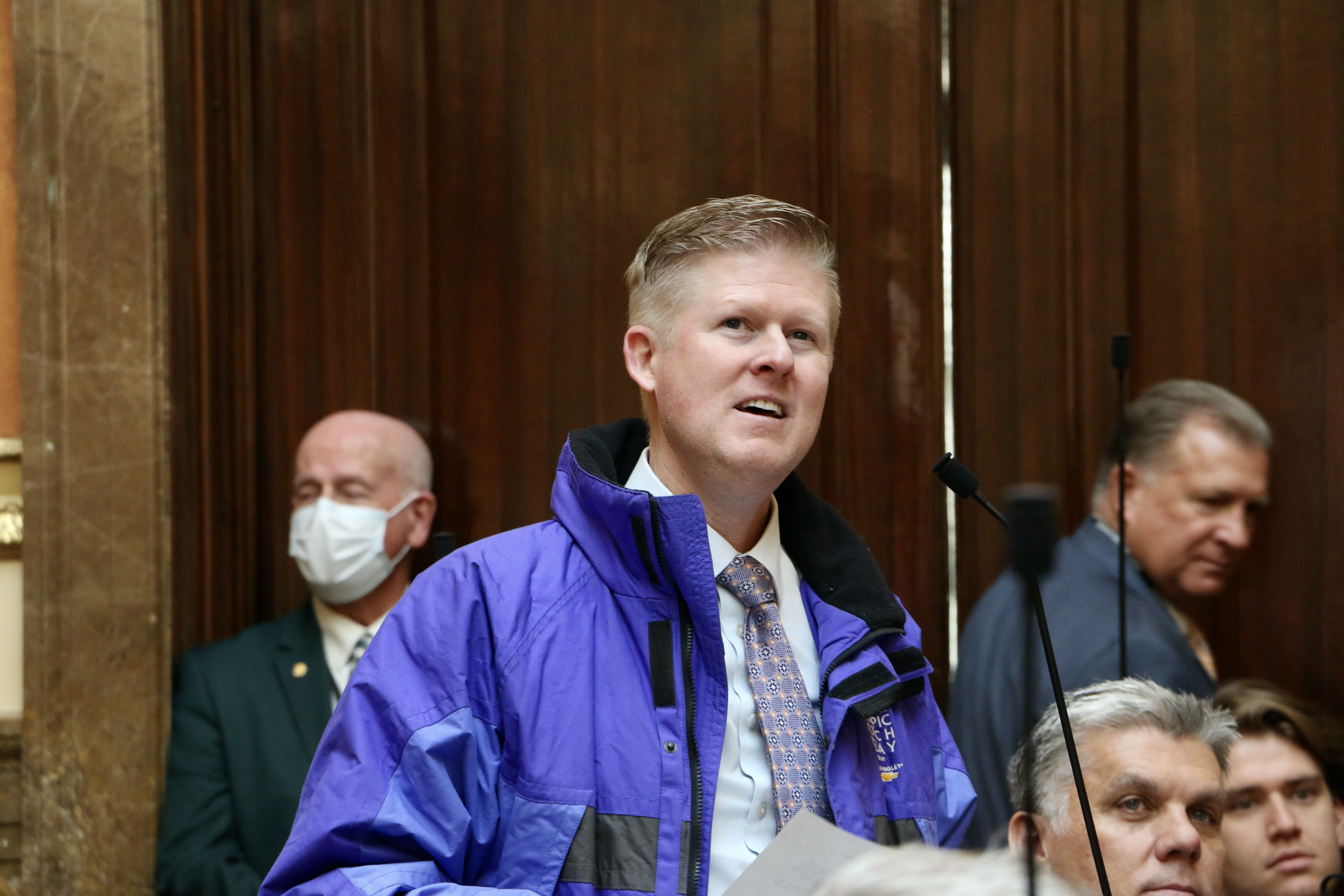
- A photo of Jon Hawkins, Utah House of Representatives

Member of the Utah House of Representatives
- Incumbent
- Assumed office January 1, 2019
- Preceded by: Brian Greene
- Constituency: 57th district (2019–2023); 55th district (2023–present)

Personal details
- Born: Orem, Utah
- Party: Republican
- Education: Brigham Young University (BA, MBA)

Jon Hawkins is an American politician from Utah. He currently serves as the representative for Utah House District 55. During the 2022 General Session, he served on the Higher Education Appropriations Subcommittee, House Business and Labor Committee, House Ethics Committee, House Judiciary Committee, and Occupational and Professional Licensure Review Committee.

== Education and biographical information ==
Hawkins earned his BA in communications and his MBA from Brigham Young University. He currently works in Software Sales and Workfront. Hawkins served on the Pleasant Grove Planning Commission from 2016 to 2018, and has previously served as a Boy Scout leader and youth sports coach.

In January 2021, Hawkins was hospitalized with COVID-19. He was intubated and underwent tracheotomy. He was released from the hospital in March.

== 2022 sponsored legislation ==
Bill	Status
HB 45- Justice Court Judge Elections Amendments	House/ to Governor 3/10/22
HB 102- Telephone Solicitation Modifications	House/ filed 3/4/22
HB 266- Trauma-informed Research and Training Grant Program	House/ filed 3/4/22
HB 313- Election Security Amendments	Draft of Enrolled Bill Prepared 3/8/22
HB 338- Travel Insurance Amendments	House/ to Governor 3/10/22
HCR 3- Concurrent Resolution Supporting the Role of the Electoral College in the Presidential Election Process	House/ filed 3/4/22
HJR 12- Joint Resolution Recognizing the Utah Olympic Legacy	House/ enrolled bill to Printing Clerk of the House 3/11/22
