= Brian Shaw =

Brian or Bryan Shaw may refer to:

== Sports ==
- Brian Shaw (basketball) (born 1966), American basketball coach and former player
- Bryan Shaw (baseball) (born 1987), American baseball player
- Brian Shaw (ice hockey, born 1962), Canadian ice hockey player
- Brian C. Shaw (1930–1993), Canadian ice hockey coach
- Brian Shaw (rugby league) (1931–2011), English rugby league footballer
- Brian Shaw (strongman) (born 1982), American strongman competitor

== Others ==
- Brian Shaw (dancer) (1928–1992), British ballet dancer
- Bryan Shaw (chemist) (born 1976), American chemist
- Brian Duncan Shaw (1898–1999), British chemistry lecturer
- Brian Shaw (shipping executive) (1933–2011), chairman of the International Chamber of Shipping
