= Brian Marshall (disambiguation) =

Brian Marshall (born 1973) is an American musician and songwriter.

Brian Marshall or Bryan Marshall may also refer to:

- Brian Marshall (footballer) (born 1954), English footballer
- Brian Marshall (high jumper) (born 1965), Canadian high jumper
- Brian Marshall (rugby union) (1940–2023), Irish international rugby union player
- Bryan Marshall (1938–2019), British actor
- Bryan Marshall (jockey) in 1954 Grand National
