= Brian Griffin (disambiguation) =

Brian Griffin is a fictional character from the American animated sitcom Family Guy.

Brian Griffin may also refer to:

- Brian Griffin (lacrosse) (1941–2020), Australian lacrosse player
- Brian Griffin (photographer) (1948–2024), British photographer
- Brian C. Griffin (born 1958), American businessman
