= Brian Freeman =

Brian Freeman may refer to:

- Brian Freeman (psychological suspense author) (born 1963), author of psychological suspense novels
- Brian James Freeman (born 1979), American horror and fiction author from Pennsylvania
- Brian Freeman (actor), founded gay theatre troupe Pomo Afro Homos

== See also ==
- Bryan Freeman (born 1978), American murderer
- Brian Friedman (born 1977), American dancer and choreographer
