= Brian Wood =

Brian Wood may refer to:

- Brian Wood (writer) (born 1972), American writer for graphic novels, video games, and television
- Brian Wood (footballer) (1940–2014), English footballer
- Brian Wood (artist) (born 1948), artist and photographer
- Brian Wood (journalist), American television news anchor and reporter
- Brian Wood (British Army soldier) (born 1980)

== See also ==
- Bryan Wood (born 1954), Australian rules footballer
- Bryan Wood (curler) (born 1944), Canadian curler
- Brian Woods (disambiguation)
