= Brian Simmons (disambiguation) =

Brian Simmons (born 1975), is a former American football player.

Brian Simmons may also refer to:

- Brian Simmons (baseball) (born 1973), American baseball player
- Brian Simmons (sound engineer)
- Brian Simmons (Canadian football) (born 1985), Canadian football player
- Bryan Simmons, radio host on KOST
- Brian Simmons, the author of The Passion Translation, a version of the English Bible.
