= Brian Baatzsch =

German SPD politician (born 1995)

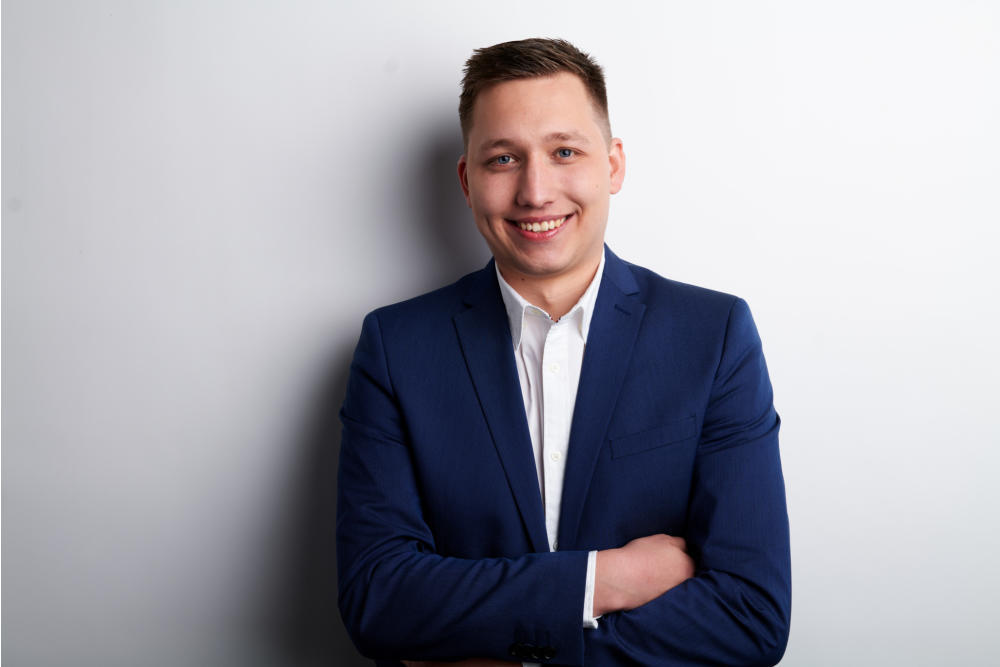
- Baatzsch in 2022

Member of the Landtag of Lower Saxony
- Incumbent
- Assumed office 8 November 2022
- Constituency: District 34 (Springe)

Personal details
- Born: 23 October 1995 (age 30) Hildesheim
- Party: Social Democratic Party (since 2016)

Brian Baatzsch (born 23 October 1995 in Hildesheim) is a German politician (Social Democratic Party) and political scientist. He has been a member of the Lower Saxony State Parliament (Landtag of Lower Saxony) since 8 November 2022, representing district 34 (Springe) as a directly elected member. In addition to his work in the state parliament, he is active at the local level and serves as a member of several political bodies, including the Council of the City of Springe, the Regional Assembly of the Hanover Region, and the Congress of Local and Regional Authorities (CLRAE) of the Council of Europe.

== Political career ==
Baatzsch joined the Social Democratic Party (SPD) in 2016. He first served as chair of the Young Socialists (Jusos) in Springe and later became chairman of the SPD local association of the city. In the 2021 local elections, he was directly elected both to the City Council of Springe and to the Regional Assembly of the Hanover Region, where he served as deputy chair of the SPD group from 2021 to 2025. In the City Council, he chairs the Budget Committee.

In the 2022 state election of Lower Saxony, Baatzsch won his district as a directly elected member, defeating the incumbent with 35.3 percent of the vote. In parliament, he serves on the Committees on Federal and European Affairs, Legal and Constitutional Affairs, and Media, and represents his group on the Board of Trustees of the Lower Saxony Memorials Foundation as spokesperson for remembrance policy. His main areas of interest include European affairs, legal and constitutional policy, and social inclusion.

In 2024, Baatzsch was appointed by the State Government of Lower Saxony as a delegate to the Congress of Local and Regional Authorities (CLRAE) of the Council of Europe, where he serves on the Committee on Social Inclusionand is a member of the Group of Socialists, Greens and Progressive Democrats (SOC/G/PD). In October 2025, he took part as an election observer in the local elections in North Macedonia, as part of a monitoring mission of the Council of Europe.

In September 2025, the SPD in Springe nominated him as its candidate for Mayor of Springe, emphasizing his focus on citizen participation, efficient administration, and transparent local governance.

== Education and early career ==
Baatzsch studied political science and law at Leibniz University Hannover, earning a Bachelor of Arts degree in 2022. He completed voluntary military service and gained work experience in gastronomy, customer service, and production before entering politics. During his studies, he completed internships in the German Bundestag, at the courts of Hildesheim, and in the State Chancellery of Lower Saxony.

He lives in Lüdersen, a district of the City of Springe.
