= Brian McFadden (disambiguation) =

Brian McFadden (born 1980), is an Irish singer.

Brian McFadden may also refer to:

- Brian McFadden (cartoonist)
- Brian McFadden, character in Seven Brides for Seven Brothers (TV series)

== See also ==
- Brian MacFadyen, musician in The Vacant Lots
- Brian McFadyen, on the Tasmania cricket team
- Bryant McFadden, American football player
