= Brian Marshall (rugby union) =

Irish rugby union player

- Full name: Brian David Edward Marshall
- Born: 25 July 1940
- Died: 24 April 2023 (aged 82)
- School: Campbell College
- University: Queen's University Belfast

Rugby union career
- Position: Fullback
International career
Years	Team	Apps	(Points)
1963	Ireland	1	(0)

Brian David Edward Marshall (25 July 1940 — 24 April 2023) was an Irish international rugby union player.

A Campbell College product, Marshall played his senior rugby with Queen's University and CIYMS.

Marshall, who captained Ulster, won his solitary Ireland cap during the 1963 Five Nations, deputising for injured captain Tom Kiernan at fullback for the match against England at Lansdowne Road, which finished in a scoreless draw.

== See also ==
- List of Ireland national rugby union players
