= Brian Keith (disambiguation) =

Brian Keith (1921–1997) was an American actor.

Brian or Bryan Keith may also refer to:

- Brian Keith (judge) (born 1944), British judge
- Brian Keith (born 1942), original vocalist for British rock band Plastic Penny
- Bryan Keith (singer), singer
- Bryan Keith (wrestler), professional wrestler
