= Brian Scott (disambiguation) =

Brian Scott (born 1988) is an American race car driver.

Brian Scott may also refer to:

- Brian Torrey Scott (1976–2013), American writer
- Brian Scott (rugby union) (born 1993), Irish rugby union player
- Brian Scott (Canadian politician)

== See also ==
- Bryan Scott (born 1981), American football linebacker
- Bryan Scott (quarterback) (born 1995), American football quarterback
- Ryan Scott (disambiguation)
