= Brian Higgins (disambiguation) =

Brian Higgins (born 1959) is a former U.S. representative for New York.

Brian Higgins may also refer to:

- Brian Higgins (sportscaster) (born 1982), American radio sportscaster
- Brian Higgins (producer) (born 1966), British music producer
- Brian Higgins (poet) (1930–1965), Irish poet, mathematician and rugby league player
- Brian Higgins (trade unionist) (1940/41-2019), Scottish construction worker and trade unionist
- Brian Higgins, American alleged conspirator in the Gretchen Whitmer kidnapping plot

== See also ==
- Bryan Higgins (1741–1818), Irish scientist
- Bryan Higgins, member of the hip-hop group Leaders of the New School
- Bryan Higgins (cricketer) (1927-2003), New Zealand cricketer
- Brian O'Higgins (1882–1963), Irish politician
