= Brian Turner (soccer, born 1952) =

Australian soccer player (1952–2010)

Brian Joseph Turner (29 March 1952 – 29/30 May 2010) was an Australian soccer forward.

== Club career ==
Turner began his soccer career with New Lambton in the Northern New South Wales State League. In 1969, he spent time with Tottenham in England, though did not play a first team match. Returning to Australia in 1971, he played for Western Suburbs in the New South Wales State League before transferring in April 1974 to Sydney Croatia for $3,000. A knee injury retired him from soccer in the mid-1970s.

== International career ==
In November 1971 Turner made his only appearance for Australia against Israel in Melbourne.

== Agency, family and death ==
After retiring from playing, Turner was a player agent, helping prospects into the global game. He died in Canberra in May 2010, a year after a cancer diagnosis, leaving two sons and a daughter.
