= Brian Greene (politician) =

American politician

Member of the Utah House of Representatives from the 57th district
- In office January 1, 2013 – December 31, 2018
- Preceded by: Craig Frank
- Succeeded by: Jon Hawkins

Personal details
- Born: May 29
- Party: Republican
- Spouse: Renee
- Education: Brigham Young University; J. Reuben Clark Law School
- Profession: Lawyer
- Website: vote4briangreene.com

Brian M. Greene is an American politician and a Republican member of the Utah House of Representatives representing District 57 from January 1, 2013 to December 31, 2018.

== Early life and career ==
Greene earned his BA from Brigham Young University and his JD from its J. Reuben Clark Law School. He works as an attorney and small business owner and lives in Pleasant Grove, Utah with his wife Renee and three children.

== Political career ==
When District 57 incumbent Republican Representative Craig Frank ran for the Utah State Senate in 2012 and left the seat open, Greene was selected as one of two candidates from the Republican convention for the June Republican Primary which he won with 2,057 votes (55.4%) and won the November General election with 11,029 votes (85.8%) against Democratic nominee Scott Gygi.

In 2014, Greene defeated both John Stevens and Holly Richardson in the Republican convention and then continued on to defeat Democratic nominee Michael Plowman in the November 4, 2014 general election with 6,317 votes (82.5%).

In 2015, Greene questioned whether sex with an unconscious spouse should be considered rape during a committee hearing on a measure which sought to clarify that sex with an unconscious individual is rape. Greene later apologized for his comments and said media reports had taken his words out of context.

During the 2016 legislative session, Greene served on the Natural Resources, Agriculture, and Environmental Quality Appropriations Subcommittee, the House Judiciary Committee as well as the House Revenue and Taxation Committee.

== 2016 sponsored legislation ==
Bill number	Bill title	Status
HB0010S04	Initiative and Referendum Amendments	Governor Signed - 3/29/2016
HB019	Expungement Amendments	House/ filed - 3/10/2016
HB0022S01	Civil Asset Forfeiture - Procedural Reforms	House/ filed - 3/10/2016
HB0085S02	Attorney Fee Revisions	House/ filed - 3/10/2016
HB0088	Noncompetition Agreement Amendments	House/ filed - 3/10/2016
HB0116S03	Determination of Employer Status Amendments	Governor Signed - 3/29/2016
HB0118S01	Public Access of Administrative Action Amendments	Governor Signed - 3/28/2016
HB0215S01	Local Option Sales and Use Tax Amendments	House/ filed - 3/10/2016
HB0321	Real Estate Transaction Amendments	Governor Signed - 3/29/2016
HB0376	Property Tax and Fair Market Value	House/ filed - 3/10/2016

Representative Greene also floor sponsored SB0090S04 Falsification of Information in a Protective Order Proceeding.
