= Brian Keenan (musician, born 1982) =

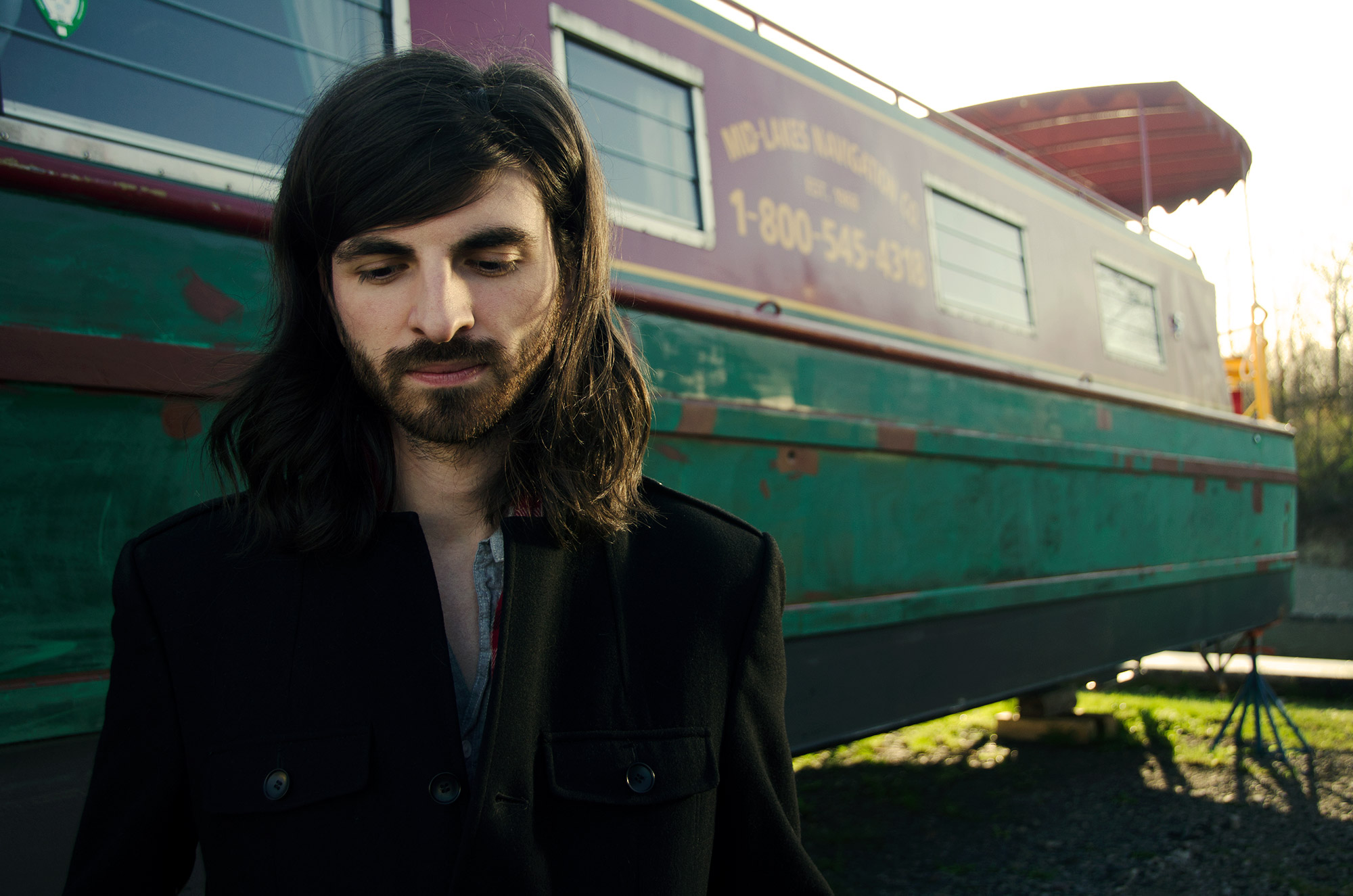
- Brian Keenan, singer songwriter

Background information
- Born: Brian Keenan; August 23, 1982 (age 44); Rochester, New York
- Origin: Brooklyn
- Genres: Americana, alt country, rock
- Occupations: Singer, songwriter
- Years active: 2003–present
- Label: Independent
- Website: briankeenan.com

Brian Keenan (born August 23, 1982) is a Brooklyn-based songwriter and musician. He was born in Rochester, New York where he resided until 2005.

He has released albums under his own name, and as frontman for the Americana band Proud Simon. He played lead guitar in indie pop outfit Cricket Spin. His debut solo album Today This Year was released on August 1, 2011.

Today This Year was recorded at Avatar Studios in New York City. The album featured a 12-piece live band, including members of The Cardinals, Chris Cubeta & the Liars Club, Ghost Gamblers and more.

The album debuted on AOL's Spinner website, and the video for From Scratch was featured on Paste Magazine's website.

Keenan founded Proud Simon with his cousin Charlie Monte Verde in Rochester, NY. The band recorded three full-length albums: Night of Criminals, Shoestring Universe and Sometimes a Stranger. They released three EPs: Anchors Aweigh, Victory March and Leaving.

The band split in 2010 with Keenan's decision to record under his own name.

Their song Burning Bridges was featured in independent film Sneakers & Soul.

The main instruments used in his songs are acoustic guitar, often accompanied by organ, pedal steel, bass and drums. His influences include Ryan Adams, Townes Van Zandt, Radiohead, and Wilco.
