= Brian Jenkins =

Brian Jenkins may refer to:

- Brian Jenkins (accountant) (1935–2024), Lord Mayor of London
- Brian Jenkins (American football) (born 1971), college football coach at Bethune-Cookman University
- Brian Jenkins (footballer) (1935–2021), Welsh footballer
- Brian Jenkins (politician) (born 1942), British Labour Party politician, MP for Tamworth
- Brian Jenkins (swimmer) (1943–2017), British Olympic swimmer
- Brian Michael Jenkins (born 1942), U.S. terrorism expert

== See also ==
- Bryan Jenkins, Australian chief executive
