= Brian Bedford (disambiguation) =

Brian Bedford may refer to:

- Brian Bedford (1935–2016), English actor
- Brian Bedford (footballer) (1933–2022), Welsh footballer
- Brian Bedford (gridiron football) (born 1965), American football wide receiver
- Brian Bedford (songwriter), English songwriter (Artisan)
