= Brian Magee (cricketer) =

Canadian cricketer

Personal information
- Full name: Brian Robert Boyd Magee
- Born: 4 May 1918; Toronto, Ontario, Canada
- Died: May 2006 (aged 87–88); Toronto, Ontario, Canada
- Batting: Left-handed
- Bowling: Left-arm medium

Domestic team information
- Years: Team
- 1954: Canada

Career statistics
Competition	FC
Matches	1
Runs scored	16
Batting average	8.00
100s/50s	–/–
Top score	13
Balls bowled	72
Wickets	1
Bowling average	40.00
5 wickets in innings	–
10 wickets in match	–
Best bowling	1/22
Catches/stumpings	–/–
- Source: Cricinfo, 27 February 2011

Brian Robert Boyd Magee (4 May 1918 – May 2006) was a Canadian cricketer. Magee was a left-handed batsman who bowled left-arm medium pace. He was born in Toronto, Ontario.

Educated at Radley College in Oxfordshire, England, Magee made a single first-class appearance for Canada in 1954 against Yorkshire at North Marine Road Ground, Scarborough during Canada's 1954 tour of England. In Canada's first-innings, he scored 3 runs before being dismissed by Fred Trueman and in their second-innings he scored 13 runs before being dismissed by Johnny Wardle. With the ball he took a single wicket, that of England Test cricketer Willie Watson. In Canada, he also played three matches for Ontario between 1949 and 1952, all against Manitoba. None of these matches held first-class status.

He died in May 2006, in the city of his birth.
