= Bryan Edwards (Australian footballer) =

Australian rules footballer (born 1957)

Personal information
- Full name: Bryan Edwards
- Born: 9 March 1957 (age 69); Footscray
- Original team: Albion
- Height: 185 cm (6 ft 1 in)
- Weight: 73 kg (161 lb)
- Position: Wing

Playing career^{1}
Years	Club	Games (Goals)
1980–81	Footscray	2 (0)
- ^{1} Playing statistics correct to the end of 1981.

Bryan Edwards (born 9 March 1957) is a former Australian rules footballer who played with Footscray in the Victorian Football League (VFL).
