= Brian Mustanski =

American psychologist

- Education: Indiana University Bloomington (Ph.D.)
- Scientific career
- Fields: Psychology, LGBT health
- Workplaces: Feinberg School of Medicine
- Thesis: The relationship between mood and sexual interest, behavior, and risk-taking (2004)
- Doctoral advisor: Richard Viken
- Doctoral students: Michael E. Newcomb

Brian Mustanski is an American psychologist noted for his research on the health of LGBT youth, HIV and substance use in young gay and bisexual men, and the use of new media and technology for sexual health promotion and HIV prevention. He is the Associate Vice President for Social and Behavioral Research at Northwestern University. Mustanski is a professor of Medical Social Sciences Division of Implementation Science, Psychiatry and Behavioral Sciences, Medicine-Infectious Diseases, and Psychology. He is Director of the Impact Institute at Northwestern University, Chicago, Illinois and the NIH-funded Third Coast Center for AIDS Research.

== Education and career ==
Mustanski completed his Doctor of Philosophy in clinical psychology at Indiana University Bloomington in 2004. His dissertation was titled The relationship between mood and sexual interest, behavior, and risk-taking. His graduate training was supported by a National Science Foundation Graduate Research Fellowship. His doctoral advisor was Richard Viken. He trained in sex therapy and sexuality research at the Kinsey Institute.

Mustanski is a tenured professor of Medical Social Sciences (Division of Implementation Science), Psychiatry and Behavioral Sciences, Medicine-Infectious Diseases, and Psychology at Northwestern University, Chicago, Illinois. He is Director of the Impact Institute, Director of the NIH funded Third Coast Center for AIDS Research (CFAR), and co-director of the national HIV Implementation Science Coordination Initiative. Previously he served as the co-director of the Center for Prevention Implementation Methodology. His research focuses on the health and development of LGBTQ youth and the application of new media and technology to sexual health promotion and HIV prevention. He has been a Principal Investigator of numerous NIH and foundation grants and has published over 425 journal articles in the areas of LGBTQ health, HIV/AIDS, mental health, and substance use. Dr. Mustanski is a frequent advisor to federal agencies and other organizations on LGBTQ health needs and research priorities, including being an appointed member of the NIH Advisory Committee to the Director, the National Advisory Council on Minority Health and Health Disparities and the NIH Council of Councils Sexual and Gender Minority Research Working Group.

== Awards and honors ==
Recognition for his work include Clarivate naming him a Highly Cited Researcher (top 1% of cited researchers in the Social Sciences and across disciplines), being named a William T Grant Foundation Scholar, the Society for Prevention Research Award for Advances in Culture and Diversity in Prevention Science, and the Award for Distinguished Scientific Contribution from the Society for the Psychological Study of Lesbian, Gay, Bisexual, and Transgender Issues of the American Psychological Association. In 2017, NBC News selected him as one of 30 changemakers and innovators making a positive difference in the LGBTQ community. He was elected the 46th President of the International Academy of Sex Research in 2020.

== See also ==
- LGBT people in science
