= Brian Rhodes =

Brian Rhodes may refer to:

- Brian Rhodes (footballer) (1937–1993), English footballer
- Brian Rhodes (cricketer) (1951–2019), Australian cricketer
- Brian Rhodes (Mississippi politician), 21st-century Mississippi politician
- Brian Rhodes (New Hampshire politician), 21st-century New Hampshire politician
