= Brian Thompson =

Brian Thompson commonly refers to:

- Brian Thompson (businessman) (1974–2024), UnitedHealthcare CEO killed in 2024
- Brian Thompson (actor) (born 1959), American screen actor

It may also refer to:

== Sports ==
- Brian Thompson (footballer, born 1938) (1938–2011), English goalkeeper and concert promoter
- Brian Thompson (footballer, born 1950), from North East England
- Brian Thompson (footballer, born 1952), midfielder in the English Midlands
- Brian Thompson (sailor) (born 1962), British yachtsman

== Others ==
- Brian Thompson (politician) (born c. 1981), American politician in Rhode Island
- Brian B. Thompson (fl. 1994–2012), British screenwriter

== See also ==
- Bryan Thompson (disambiguation)
- Brian Thomson (disambiguation)
- Brian Thomsen (1959–2008), American science fiction author
