= Brian MacMahon (disambiguation) =

Brian MacMahon (1923–2007) is a British-american epidemiologist.

Brian MacMahon may also refer to:

- Brian MacMahon of Macmahon Holdings
- Col. Brian MacMahon in Confederate Ireland
- Bryan MacMahon (judge) (born 1941), Irish judge
- Bryan MacMahon (writer) (1909–1998), Irish writer
- Brian MacMahon (runner) (active 2012), Irish runner

== See also ==
- Brian McMahon (disambiguation)
