= Ryan St. Anne Scott =

Traditionalist Catholic priest

Ryan Scott
- Criminal charges: Felony: Misconduct in Public Office; Felon in Possession of a Firearm

Ryan St. Anne Gevelinger (born 1953), also known as Ryan Gevelinger-Scott, formerly known as Ryan St. Anne Scott or Ryan Patrick Scott or Damien St. Anne, and born Randell Dean Stocks or Randall Dean Stocks, is an American self-proclaimed Traditionalist Catholic priest.

== Biography ==
Holy Rosary Abbey, an independent Benedictine monastery, has had multiple locations in the past decades. He belongs to the Sedevacantist movement which does not recognize the changes and reforms in the Roman Catholic Church following the Second Vatican Council.

Roman Catholic bishops and archbishops in several dioceses across the Midwestern United States have warned Catholics that they do not recognize him as a Catholic priest and have advised "the faithful" not to attend any Masses he performs or to receive sacraments from him. Bishops in the Roman Catholic Diocese of Peoria, Illinois, the Roman Catholic Diocese of La Crosse, Wisconsin, the Roman Catholic Diocese of Bismarck, North Dakota, and the Roman Catholic Archdiocese of St. Louis, Missouri, among others, have issued warnings against him in the past decades. He indicated in 2005 that he answers to "Eternal Rome" and not to the current Pope.

He has a 1993 felony conviction for misconduct in public office in Edgerton, Wisconsin, where he served as comptroller and finance director. Accusations of financial misconduct and exploitation have also followed him in his later career as a self-proclaimed priest.

In 2011, he and his followers purchased the former county home in Buchanan County Iowa, and renamed the facility Buchanan Abbey. Since the purchase, he and his organization filed separate bankruptcy filings in both Illinois and Iowa.

In July 2014, he was located in Armstrong, Missouri, where he purchased an abandoned Methodist church. He did some repairs on the church and "held services" there. That building was later sold to another party.

In April 2015, he was charged in Howard County, Missouri with three felony counts of “financial exploitation of an elderly person.” The financial exploitation charges against him were dropped the following December after the complaining party recanted her story. He pleaded guilty to felon in possession of a firearm and received five years of probation and a suspended seven-year sentence. He was charged under the name Ryan St. Anne Gevelinger. He apparently assumed this surname after he was legally adopted in 2010 by Roseanna Gevelinger, when she was about 82 and he was in his late 50s. He used the surname Scott in Armstrong and in previous locations. He has also used other names.

Scott's story had been chronicled by journalist Alex Schuman in the podcast, "Smoke Screen: Fake Priest" from Neon Hum Media. As of 2020, Scott lived in Savanna, Illinois. He continued to represent himself as a priest.
