= Brian Carroll (disambiguation) =

Brian Carroll (born 1981) is an American soccer player

Brian Carroll may also refer to:

- Brian Carroll (Australian footballer) (born 1941), Australian footballer for Melbourne
- Brian Carroll (hurler) (born 1983), Irish hurler
- Brian T. Carroll (born 1949), American Solidarity Party presidential candidate
- Buckethead (born 1969), stage name of Brian Carroll, American multi-instrumentalist
