= Charles Brady (artist) =

American-born Irish artist (1926–1997)

Charles Brady (27 July 1926–1 August 1997) was an American painter who was born and trained in New York and spent most of his life in Ireland.

Charles Brady was in the US Navy in World War II; he did mundane jobs after returning from war and took night classes in drawing. In 1948 he entered the Art Students League of New York and took a yearlong course. After art school he continued to paint, beginning to exhibit in the early 1950s and at the same time working to support himself, mostly in menial hotel jobs, but also for a while as a guard at the Metropolitan Museum of Art.

He had his first solo exhibition in the Urban Gallery in 1955 but felt at this time that his life was becoming too confused; As he wrote later:

″I was really lost. I wasn't capable of living that way - the very late nights, the heavy drinking, the carousing, the women - I couldn't seem to get my life together.″

To escape, he travelled by ferry to Ireland in 1956 and began painting the Irish countryside. He returned to New York in 1958 but in 1959 he moved back to Ireland and settled there for good, first in Dublin and then Dún Laoghaire. Poverty forced him to paint on small pieces of cardboard and small pictures became typical; he began to value the intimacy, and affordability, of small paintings. His ambitions were modest:

″I had hoped, from the very beginning, to sell my paintings if possible to ordinary people and my paintings would fit into living rooms or bedrooms.″

In the 1960s he began painting still lives of everyday objects such as envelopes and tickets and this also became typical. These small, modest, compositions allowed him to refine a spare almost mystical style. As one critic wrote:

″...his speciality is the raising of an object - every day or of vague historical interest [. . .] - to the intensity of aesthetic experience by the use of subtly simplified composition and muted colours.″

Charles Brady married Eelagh Noonan in 1960. Brady died of cancer at the age of seventy-one. He is buried in Shanganagh Cemetery, Shankill, Co. Dublin.

== Further reading and external links ==
- David Scott (1989), The Modern Art Collection, Trinity College Dublin. Dublin: Trinity College Dublin Press, ISBN 1-871408-01-6.
- John O'Regan (Ed.) (1993), Works 9 - Charles Brady. Dublin: Gandon Editions. ISBN 0-946641-30-7.
- Aosdána biographical note
- The Arts Council of Ireland collection includes
  - Red desk (1966)
  - White Tennis Shoe (1975)
