= Brian Cook =

Brian or Bryan Cook or Cooke may refer to:

== Entertainment ==
- Brian Cooke (born 1937), British comedy writer
- Brian W. Cook, British film director, assistant director, producer and actor
- Bryan Cook (musician), member of the American rock band Hindu Love Gods
- Brian Cook (bassist) (born 1977), American bassist currently in Russian Circles

== Sports ==
- Brian Cook (football administrator) (born 1955), Australian football administrator
- Brian Cook (basketball) (born 1980), American basketball player
- Bryan Cook (American football) (born 1999), American football safety

== Other people ==
- Sir Bryan Cooke, 4th Baronet (1684–1734), of the Cooke baronets
- Sir Bryan Cooke, 6th Baronet (1717–1766), of the Cooke baronets
- Sir Brian Batsford (1910–1991), British MP who worked as an illustrator under the name Brian Cook
