= Brian Tucker =

Brian or Bryan Tucker may refer to:

- Brian Tucker (seismologist), American seismologist
- Brian Tucker (executive) (born 1975), American golf developer and executive
- Brian Tucker (screenwriter), American film screenwriter
- Brian Tucker (writer), Canadian writer
- Bryan Tucker, American Saturday Night Live writer
