= Brian Harvey (Australian rules footballer) =

Australian rules footballer

Personal information
- Full name: Brian Harvey
- Born: 24 February 1949 (age 77)
- Original team: West Footscray
- Height: 178 cm (5 ft 10 in)
- Weight: 82 kg (181 lb)

Playing career
Years	Club	Games (Goals)
1968	Footscray	2 (0)

Brian Harvey (born 24 February 1949) is a former Australian rules football player. Harvey played two Victorian Football League (VFL) matches for Footscray.
