= Brian Duffy =

Brian Duffy may refer to:

- Brian Duffy (actor), Scottish actor, writer, and artist
- Brian Duffy (astronaut) (born 1953), American astronaut
- Brian Duffy (chef), celebrity chef
- Brian Duffy (photographer) (1933–2010), English photographer
- Brian Duffy (weightlifter), New Zealand weightlifter
- Brian John Duffy better known as Jet Black (1938–2022), drummer for The Stranglers
