= Brian Hogan =

Brian Hogan may refer to:

- Brian Hogan (architect) (1928–2020), Irish architect who designed Lansdowne House
- Brian Hogan (legal scholar) (1932–1996), English legal academic
- Brian Hogan (Kilkenny hurler) (born 1981), Irish hurler
- Brian Hogan (rugby league) (1947–2022), English rugby league footballer
- Brian Hogan (Tipperary hurler) (born 1996), Irish hurler
- Brian Hogan, Irish musician, member of Kíla

== See also ==
- Brian Cogan (born 1954), American judge
- Brian Hagan, American artist
