= Brian Grant (disambiguation) =

Brian Grant (born 1972) is an American former basketball player.

Brian Grant may also refer to:

- Brian Grant (director), British television director
- Brian Grant (footballer) (born 1964), Scottish midfielder
