= Brian McLean (disambiguation) =

Brian McLean (born 1985) is a Scottish footballer.

Brian or Bryan M(a)cLean may also refer to:

- Brian McLean (rugby union), rugby union coach
- Brian McLean (visual effects artist) (born 1977), American special effects person
- Bryan MacLean (1946–1998), musician
