= Brian Cummings (disambiguation) =

Brian Cummings (born 1948) is an American voice actor.

Brian Cummings may also refer to:

- Brian Cummings (academic), English professor
- Brian Cummings (American football) (born 1975), American football player
