= Bryan M. Turner =

Bryan Turner
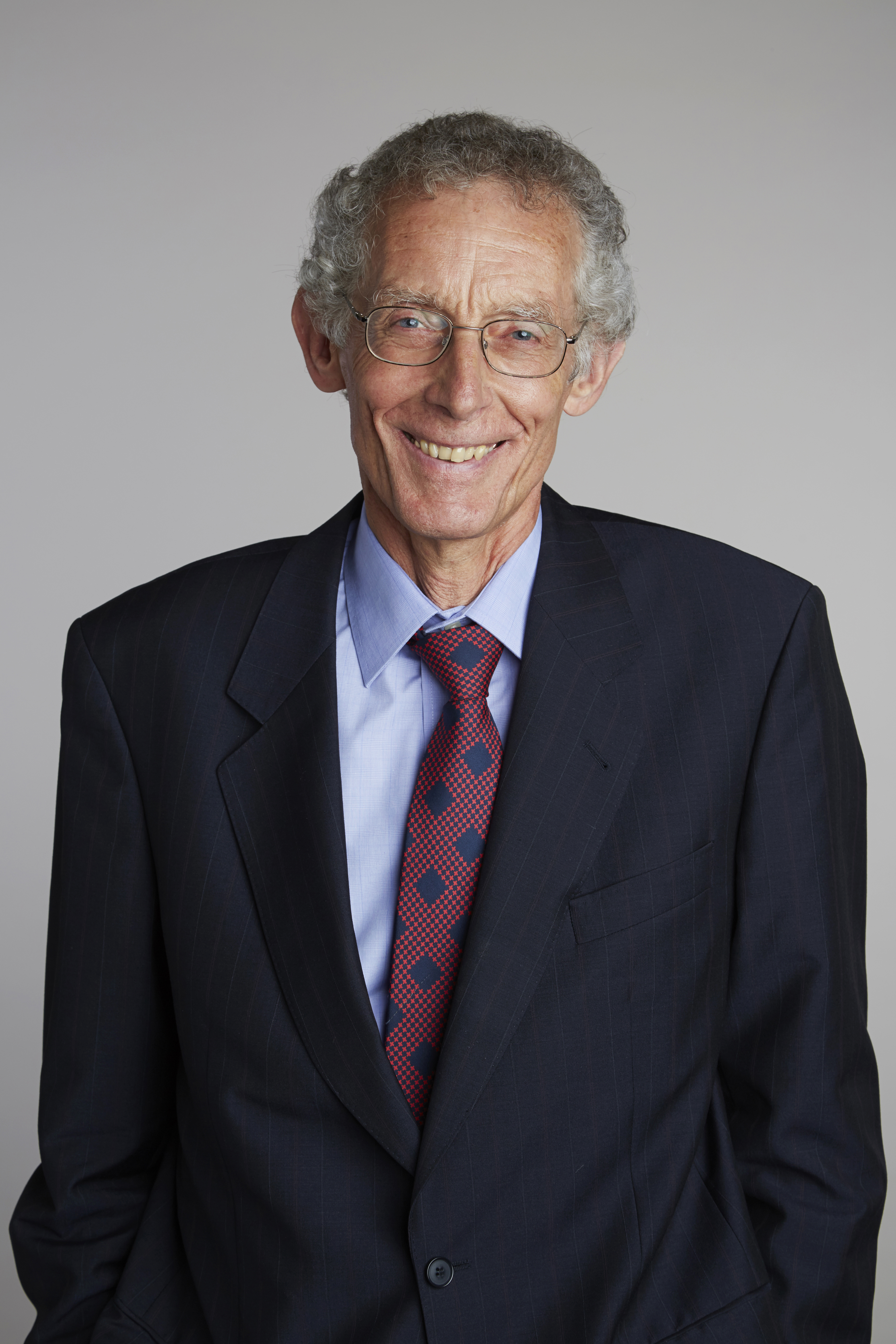
- Bryan Turner in 2015, portrait via the Royal Society
- Born: Bryan M. Turner
- Education: University College London
- Known for: contributions to epigenetics
- Awards: FRS (2015)
- Scientific career
- Fields: Genetics
- Workplaces: University of Birmingham

Bryan M. Turner is Professor of Experimental Genetics at School of Cancer Sciences, Institute of Biomedical Research, University of Birmingham in Birmingham, UK.

He was educated at University College London, where he earned his BSc in Biochemistry (1969) and PhD in Human Biochemical Genetics (1973). Before moving to Birmingham University in 1981, he was at the National Institute for Medical Research in Mill Hill (1969–70) and the Mt Sinai School of Medicine in New York (1973–78).

He has contributed to the field of epigenetics. In 2000 he was elected a Fellow of the Academy of Medical Sciences. He was elected a Fellow of the Royal Society (FRS) in 2015, his nomination reads:

Bryan Turner pioneered the use of antibodies as reagents for research into chromatin and gene expression. He was the first to use synthetic peptides to raise antisera against histones post-translationally acetylated at specific amino acids and showed that these were uniquely powerful reagents for determining the chromosomal distribution of histone modifications. His demonstration that acetylation of a specific lysine on histone H4 marked up-regulated gene transcription of the Drosophila male X chromosome opened the way to a functional understanding of the histone marks. These novel tools allowed him to link histone deacetylation to gene silencing via the discovery that chromosome-wide histone deacetylation distinguishes the inactive X chromosome in female mammals.

== See also ==
- Histone deacetylation
