= Brian Cox (American football) =

American football player and coach

Playing career
- 1985–1988: Western Illinois
- Position: Defensive end

Coaching career (HC unless noted)
- 1990: Iowa Central (DL)
- 1991–1996: Quincy (DC)
- 1997–1999: Quincy
- 2002–2006: Missouri State (DL)

Head coaching record
- Overall: 8–23

Accomplishments and honors

Awards
- All-Gateway (1988)

Brian Cox is an American former football coach. He served as the head coach at Quincy University in Quincy, Illinois from 1997 to 1999, compiling a record of 8–23. Prior to that, he had served as an assistant at both Quincy and Iowa Central Community College.

== Head coaching record ==
Year	Team	Overall	Conference	Standing	Bowl/playoffs
Quincy Hawks (NCAA Division II independent) (1997–1999)
1997	Quincy	0–10			
1998	Quincy	4–6			
1999	Quincy	3–8			
Quincy:		8–23			
Total:		8–23			
