= Brian Thomson =

Brian Thomson may refer to:

- Brian Thomson (scenic designer) (born 1946), Australian theatre, opera and film designer
- Brian Thomson (journalist) (born 1965), Scottish-born Australian journalist
- Brian Thomson (sport shooter) (born 1957), Olympic sport shooter for New Zealand
- Brian Harold Thomson (1918–2006), newspaper proprietor of D. C. Thomson & Co.
- Brian Thomson (footballer) (born 1959), Scottish footballer

== See also ==
- Brian Thomsen (1959–2008), science fiction editor, author, and anthologist
- Brian Thompson (disambiguation)
