= Brian Sigu =

- Born: Kenya
- Origin: Kenyan
- Genre: Benga
- Instrument: Guitar

Brian Sigu is a Kenyan musician.

He fuses Luo folk music and benga music which evolved around the 1950s.Original benga was created by infusing beats from instruments such as Orutu and nyatiti with drums. The rhythm was slow and poetic.

Sigu is a songwriter, singer, guitarist, and composer.

He started his band, Brian Sigu and Kavirondo Blues Band.

Sigu combines afro fusion and afro pop.

== Albums ==
- Jambaka released on November 23, 2021
- Apaka released on June 16, 2023.
