= Brian Briggs (disambiguation) =

Brian Briggs (1932–1996) was an English rugby league footballer.

Brian or Bryan Briggs may also refer to:

- Brian Briggs (musician), English musician
- Brian Briggs, founder of BBspot
