= Brian Myers (disambiguation) =

Brian Myers (born 1985), is an American professional wrestler.

Brian Myers may also refer to:

- Brian Reynolds Myers, American academic

== See also ==
- Bryant Myers, Puerto Rican musician
- Brian Meyer (disambiguation)
