= Brian Moran (disambiguation) =

Brian Moran (born 1959), is an American politician and a member of the Democratic Party of Virginia.

Brian Moran may also refer to:

- Brian Moran (baseball) (born 1988), American professional baseball pitcher
- Brian T. Moran, United States Attorney
