= Brian Lansing Martin =

American convicted murderer

Brian Martin
- Born: Brian Lansing Martin; 1980 (age 45–46); United States
- Status: On death row
- Convictions: 2013; Manslaughter; 2026; Capital murder
- Criminal charge: Capital murder
- Penalty: Ten years' imprisonment (manslaughter); Death (Risner's murder)

Brian Lansing Martin is an American convicted murderer who has been charged in connection with the deaths of three people between 2011 and 2021. In May 2011, Martin shot and killed his father in Colbert County, Alabama. He was subsequently convicted of manslaughter and sentenced to ten years in prison. After serving three years of his sentence, Martin was released on parole for good conduct in May 2016.

In October 2021, Martin was charged with the fatal shootings of two additional people: his roommate, William Mealback Jr., and Sheffield Police Sergeant Nick Risner. Martin was convicted of capital murder in Sergeant Risner’s death, and the jury unanimously recommended the death penalty. He was later officially sentenced by the judge in that case. Martin also remains awaiting trial for the killing of Mealback, for which prosecutors are seeking the death penalty.

== First murder ==
On May 11, 2011, Brian Lansing Martin shot and killed his father, Donice Scott (also known as "Boo Boo" Scott). According to Martin's statements, he claimed that he acted in self-defense. He recounted that, on the date of his father's death, he was planning to visit his father and get some money, but Scott was armed with a sword when he came face to face with Martin at the doorstep of his home. Martin stated that this prompted him to fire shots in self-defense, resulting in Scott sustaining a fatal chest wound and later dying at the Helen Keller Hospital. Martin was not arrested until August 2012, and a grand jury indicted him on a charge of murder. Initially, a trial date was set in October 2012, before it was delayed to January 2013.

The jury selection for Martin's trial commenced in January 2013. On February 1, 2013, during the jury deliberation phase, Martin reached a plea agreement with the prosecution, and pleaded guilty to manslaughter in exchange for a sentence of ten years' imprisonment.

Martin was released from prison in May 2016 after only serving three years of his sentence, due to him accumulating "good time" credit behind bars due to good behaviour throughout his imprisonment, which enabled the reduction of his sentence by two-thirds, and at one point, in 2015, the Alabama Bureau of Pardons and Paroles denied parole for Martin, before the Alabama Department of Corrections released him the following year. However, throughout his incarceration, Martin was also disciplined for several prison rule violations.

== 2021 killings ==
On October 1, 2021, in Northwest Alabama, Brian Martin committed a series of shootings that led to the deaths of two people. On that day in Muscle Shoals, Alabama, Martin allegedly shot and killed his 58-year-old friend and roommate, William Mealback Jr., and it was noted by witnesses that an argument was likely happening between both men inside their truck, before Martin shot Mealback in the head and pushed his body out of the truck while it was still moving, and Martin subsequently drove over Mealback's body. While Martin was fleeing the scene in his truck, a motorist reported the incident to the police and also provided the vehicle license plate number.

Upon the report, which initially classified the case as a hit-and-run accident, the authorities issued the BOLO ("be on the lookout") alert, and later on, the police received a tip-off that a vehicle resembling Martin's truck was likely at Woodward Avenue. Several Sheffield police officers quickly spotted the truck and they started pursuing Martin. The chase eventually ended outside the Old Southgate Mall in Muscle Shoals, and when he was cornered behind the mall, Martin began to fire multiple shots at the officers.

The shooting led to two of the officers being wounded. One of them, Sheffield Police Lieutenant Max Dotson, received minor wounds after being struck twice in his bullet-proof vest, but the other officer, 40-year-old Sergeant James Nicholas "Nick" Risner, was mortally wounded after he was shot through his driver's side door. The rest of the officers returned fire and the gunfight ended after Martin was injured and subdued by the police. As for Lieutenant Dotson and Sergeant Risner, both were hospitalized in the aftermath of the incident, but Sergeant Risner died from his injuries at the Huntsville Hospital on October 2, 2021. Dotson was discharged after receiving treatment for his wounds. Martin was also taken to Huntsville Hospital to receive treatment, and he was reportedly in stable condition.

== Charges ==
After his arrest, Brian Martin was charged with capital murder for the fatal shootings of both William Mealback and Sergeant Nick Risner on October 6, 2021.

On the same day Martin was charged, Colbert County District Attorney Bryce Graham announced that his office were planning to seek the death penalty against Martin for the two murders.

On December 3, 2021, the case of Martin was transferred to a grand jury for review of indictment.

On January 12, 2022, the grand jury formally indicted Martin on four counts of capital murder for the shooting deaths of both Sergeant Risner and Mealback, and three counts each of attempted murder and shooting into an occupied vehicle, and one count each of certain persons forbidden to possess a pistol and abuse of a corpse.

On April 28, 2022, Martin officially pleaded not guilty to the charges.

== Pre-trial motions and developments ==
On October 5, 2022, Circuit Judge Jacqueline Hatcher issued a court order for Brian Martin to undergo psychiatric evaluation before standing trial.

In October 2023, Martin dismissed his lawyers on the grounds of ineffective assistance from his counsel.

In January 2025, it was reported that after several delays, Martin would be assessed on a later date by state psychiatrists to determine if he was mentally fit to stand trial. In November 2025, Martin waived his right to a mental competency hearing, and that same month, he was deemed mentally competent to be put on trial for the murders.

On March 11, 2026, Martin's first trial for the capital murder of Sergeant Risner was scheduled to take place on August 24, 2026.

On May 25, 2026, Martin filed a motion seeking to change his trial venue from Colbert County to another county due to the extensive pre-trial publicity and the feelings of the community, which might affect Martin's right to a fair trial. The state opposed the motion and argued that Martin's submission failed to meet the burden of proof required for the change of his trial venue. In the end, Martin's request to change his trial venue was denied on June 18, 2026.

On June 22, 2026, Circuit Judge Mitchell Hays denied the prosecution's motion to simultaneously try the cases of both Sergeant Risner and Mealback in the same trial.

On July 16, 2026, the prosecution announced that they would be seeking the death penalty against Martin for the murders of Mealback and Sergeant Risner in his upcoming trials.

On July 31, 2026, the judge ruled that the evidence of Mealback's murder shall not be presented in the trial related to Sergeant Risner's murder, and his manslaughter conviction would also be excluded from the trial.

== Murder trials ==
=== Trial for murder of Risner ===
Brian Martin stood trial first for the murder of Sergeant Nick Risner. On August 24, 2026, jury selection commenced for Martin's first capital murder trial. A 12-member jury was assembled on August 28, 2026, to hear the case.

On September 10, 2026, Martin was found guilty of all ten criminal counts: three counts of capital murder, three counts of attempted murder, three counts of shooting into an occupied vehicle, and one count of certain persons forbidden to possess a firearm.

On September 11, 2026, after deliberating for less than 12 minutes, the 12-member jury unanimously sentenced Martin to death for the murder of Sergeant Risner. Under Alabama law, the death penalty could be imposed if at least ten of 12 jurors voted in favor of it. A formal sentencing hearing was then scheduled for October 26, 2026. On that date, Martin was officially sentenced to death by Judge Mitchell Hays.

The trial of Martin for the murder of Sergeant Risner, which spanned for two weeks, was known to be the longest trial throughout the history of Colbert County.

=== Trial for murder of Mealback ===
On September 14, 2026, four days after Martin was convicted of the murder of Sergeant Nick Risner, William Mealback's daughter spoke to the media that she felt that justice was served with Martin potentially heading to death row for the police officer's murder, but the family hoped to see Martin being put on trial for the killing of Mealback. It was further reported that the family were contacting the Colbert County District Attorney's Office for updates regarding Mealback's case.

On October 2, 2026, a judge ordered that Martin should stand trial on February 1, 2027, for the capital murder of Mealback.

== Aftermath ==
In March 2022, state politician Phillip Pettus proposed the Sergeant Nick Risner Bill, a bill named after the victim, which aimed to bar any prisoners convicted of a homicide from the possibility of early release based on correctional incentive time. The Alabama House voted 99–1 to pass the bill that month. A month later, in April 2022, state senators made a unanimous vote of 28–0 to pass the bill, which was eventually signed into law by Governor Kay Ivey.

In 2022, the Jackson Highway and Cox Boulevard was conferred the name "Sgt. James 'Nick' Nicholas Risner Memorial Drive" to commomerate the fallen officer.

== See also ==
- Capital punishment in Alabama
