= Brian Coleman (disambiguation) =

Brian Coleman (born 1961) is a British Conservative Party politician.

Brian Coleman may also refer to:

- Brian Coleman (footballer, born 1932) (1932–1966), Essendon VFL footballer
- Brian Coleman (footballer, born 1935), former Hawthorn VFL footballer

== See also ==
- Bryan Coleman (1911–2005), English film and television actor
