= Brian Kim =

Brian Kim may refer to:

- Brian Kim (hedge fund manager), an American hedge fund manager
- Kim Beom-soo (businessman) (born 1966), also known as Brian Kim, a Korean entrepreneur and founder of Kakao
- Brian S. Kim, professor, medical researcher and businessman
