= Brian Reynolds =

Brian Reynolds may refer to:

- Brian Reynolds (cricketer) (1932–2015), English professional cricketer
- Brian Reynolds (game designer) (born 1967), American strategy game designer
- Brian Reynolds (RAF officer) (1902–1965), British air marshal
- Brian Reynolds (politician), Maliseet politician, a non-voting representative in the Maine House of Representatives
- Brian Eddie Reynolds (born 1976), British musician, frontman of Creation's Tears

== See also ==
- Brian Reynolds Myers (born 1963), professor of international studies in South Korea
- Bryan Reynolds (disambiguation)
