= Brian Butler =

Brian Butler may refer to:

== Entertainment ==
- Brian Butler (artist), American filmmaker and dark arts musician associated with Kenneth Anger
- Brian Butler (character), fictional district attorney alter ego of Mr. Scarlet
- Brian Butler (Smash Palace), American former band member of Smash Palace
- Brian D. Butler (born 1961), American art dealer
- Brian Patrick Butler (born 1990), American actor and filmmaker

== Sports ==
- Brian Butler (cricketer) (1876–1916), English cricketer
- Brian Butler (rugby) (born 1948), Welsh rugby footballer

== Other ==
- Brian Butler, 9th Earl of Carrick (1931–1992), Earl of Carrick
- Brian Butler (Mar-a-Lago), former employee involved with the FBI search of Mar-a-Lago

== See also ==
- Denis Anthony Brian Butler, 9th Earl of Lanesborough (1918–1998), Anglo-Irish soldier
