= Brian Savage (disambiguation) =

Brian Savage (born 1971) is a Canadian former ice hockey player.

Brian Savage may also refer to:

- Brian K. Savage (born 1955), Republican member of the Vermont House of Representatives
- Scalphunter (DC Comics)
- Brian Savage, former drummer for Underground Zerø
