= Brian Lenihan =

Brian Lenihan may refer to:

- Brian Lenihan Snr (1930–1995), long-serving Irish Fianna Fáil politician
- Brian Lenihan Jnr (1959–2011), his son, Irish Fianna Fáil politician
- Brian Lenihan (footballer) (born 1994), played for Hull City and Cork City

== See also ==
- Brian Linehan (1944–2004), Canadian television host
