= Brian Cunningham =

Brian Cunningham may refer to:

- Brian Cunningham (Australian footballer) (born 1952), Australian rules footballer
- Brian Cunningham (Irish footballer) (born 2006)
- Brian Cunningham (hurler) (born 1970), Irish hurler
- Brian T. Cunningham, American engineer
- Brian A. Cunningham, American politician

== See also ==
- Bryan Cunningham, soccer coach
