= Brian Stafford =

Brian Stafford may refer to:

- Brian Stafford (Gaelic footballer) (born 1964)
- Brian L. Stafford (born 1948), director of the U.S. Secret Service
- Brian Stafford (businessman), American businessman
