= Brian Becker (disambiguation) =

Brian Becker may refer to:

- Brian Becker, member of the Connecticut House of Representatives
- Brian Becker (activist), National Coordinator of A.N.S.W.E.R.
- Brian Becker, character in The Listener (TV series)
- Brian Becker (baseball) in 1998–99 Australian Baseball League team rosters
