= Brian Dixon =

Brian Dixon may refer to:

- Brian Dixon (Australian footballer) (1936–2025), Australian rules footballer and politician
- Brian A. Dixon (born 1980), American author
- Brian Dixon (American football) (born 1990), American football player
- Brian Dixon (wrestling), British professional wrestling promoter
- Brian Dixon (bowls), South African lawn bowler
- Brian Dixon, drummer of Cathedral

== See also ==
- Brian Dickson (1916–1998), Chief Justice of Canada
