= Brian Wong (disambiguation) =

Brian Wong (born 1991), is a Canadian entrepreneur.

Brian Wong may also refer to:

- Brian Wong (racing driver) (born 1989), American racing driver
- Brian Wong (politician), Canadian provincial politician

== See also ==
- Bryan Wong (born 1971), Singaporean actor
