= Brian Brown =

Brian or Bryan Brown may refer to:

== Sports ==
- Brian Brown (Australian footballer) (born 1957), Australian rules footballer
- Brian Brown (football coach) (born 1957), Australian association football player and coach
- Brian Brown (Jamaican footballer) (born 1992), Jamaican footballer
- Brian Brown (high jumper) (born 1967), American high jumper, former director of the Drake Relays
- Brian Brown (racing driver) (born 1978), American race car driver
- Bryan Brown (American football) (born 1983), American football coach

== Arts and entertainment ==
- Brian Brown (musician) (1933–2013), Australian jazz saxophonist
- Bryan Brown (born 1947), Australian actor
- Box Brown (Brian Brown, born 1980), American cartoonist

== Military ==
- Brian Brown (Royal Navy officer) (1934–2020)
- Bryan D. Brown (born 1948), US general
- Brian B. Brown (born 1964), U.S. Navy officer

== Other ==
- Brian Brown (minister) (born 1938), South African minister and activist
- Brian Brown (North Carolina politician) (born 1979), American politician
- Brian S. Brown (born c. 1974), American activist, president of the National Organization for Marriage
- Brian H. Brown, British medical physicist

== See also ==
- Brian Browne (1937–2018), Canadian jazz pianist and composer
