= Bryan Shaw (chemist) =

American biochemist

Bryan F. Shaw is an American biochemist, inventor, and educator. He is a professor in the department of chemistry and biochemistry at Baylor University in Waco, Texas.

== Education ==
Shaw grew up in Spokane, Washington. He earned an undergraduate degree in Biochemistry/Biophysics at Washington State University, and received his Ph.D. in chemistry at the University of California, Los Angeles. He worked as a post-doctoral fellow at Harvard University.

== Career ==
He is best known for developing free software for smartphones that can detect eye cancer (retinoblastoma) and other eye disorders in children by searching the child's picture for "white eye" (leukocoria). Shaw developed this software after his wife detected "white eye" in pictures of their own son, who was later diagnosed with retinoblastoma. Shaw is an advocate for parent-based, photographic screening of pediatric eye diseases that present with "white-eye". The software has been credited with initiating multiple early diagnoses of retinoblastoma, Coats' disease, and myelin retinal nerve fiber layer.

In 2016 he testified to the U.S. House Science, Space, and Technology Committee on the development of the software, known as CRADLE (Computer Assisted Detector of Leukocoria).

Shaw has also invented a new method for visualizing 3D imagery in STEM education. The method encourages the use of oral stereognosis (oral somatosensory perception) to visualize small 3D models of images, using the mouth (tongue, lips, teeth). It was designed to help students with blindness visualize STEM images, but is not limited to students with blindness.
