= Brian Young =

Brian Young may refer to:

== Music ==
- Brian Young (drummer), drummer for New York–based pop band Fountains of Wayne
- Brian Young (Australian musician) (1935–2016), Australian country music singer-songwriter

== Sport ==
- Brian Young (American football, born 1972), American football coach and head football coach of Stetson University
- Brian Young (American football, born 1977), American football coach and former defensive tackle
- Brian Young (ice hockey) (born 1958), Canadian ice hockey defenceman

== Other people ==
- Brian Young (magistrate) (born 1954), served as magistrate of the British Overseas Territory of Pitcairn Island
- Brian Young (politician) (born 1949), Canadian politician in Nova Scotia
- Brian Young (Royal Navy officer) (1930–2009), British Royal Navy officer

== See also ==
- Brianyoungite, a secondary zinc carbonate mineral named after Brian Young (born 1947), a British field geologist
- Bryan Young (disambiguation)
