= Brian Campbell (disambiguation) =

Brian Campbell (born 1979) is a Canadian former professional ice hockey defenceman.

Brian Campbell may also refer to:

- Brian Campbell (game designer), American game developer
- Brian Campbell (golfer) (born 1993), American golfer
- Brian Campbell (rugby league), played for Ellerslie during the 1958 New Zealand rugby league season
- Brian Campbell, co-writer of the 2001 film H3
- Brian Campbell, killed December 4, 1983 while unarmed by the British Army, see Chronology of Provisional Irish Republican Army actions (1980–89)
- Brian Campbell, see Candidates of the Victorian state election, 2006

== See also ==
- Bryan Campbell (born 1944), Canadian former professional ice hockey centre
