= Brian Lewis (cricketer) =

Welsh cricketer (born 1945)

Personal information
- Born: 18 July 1945 (age 81); Maesteg, Glamorgan, Wales
- Batting: Right-handed
- Bowling: Right-arm off-spin

Domestic team information
- Years: Team
- 1965 to 1969: Glamorgan

Career statistics
Competition	First-class	List A
Matches	37	1
Runs scored	333	4
Batting average	8.32	4.00
100s/50s	0/0	0/0
Top score	38	4
Balls bowled	4015	0
Wickets	82	–
Bowling average	24.40	–
5 wickets in innings	6	–
10 wickets in match	1	–
Best bowling	7/28	–
Catches/stumpings	29/–	1/–
- Source: Cricinfo, 5 February 2018

Brian Lewis (born 18 July 1945) is a Welsh former cricketer who played first-class cricket for Glamorgan from 1965 to 1968.

Lewis appeared in 37 first-class matches as an off-spin bowler and tail-end right-handed batsman. He scored 333 runs with a highest score of 38 and took 82 wickets with best innings figures of 7 for 28. In Glamorgan's two-wicket victory over Hampshire in 1968 he took 11 wickets for 74.
