= Brian Bailey =

Brian Bailey may refer to:

- Brian Bailey (fashion designer) (born 1958), a Canadian fashion designer
- Brian Bailey (sport shooter) (1932–2022), a British sports shooter
