= Brian Mason (disambiguation) =

Brian Mason (born 1953), is a Canadian politician.

Brian Mason may also refer to:

- Brian Mason (geochemist) (1917–2009), New Zealand geochemist, mineralogist and meteoriticist
- Brian Mason (ice hockey) (born 1950), Canadian ice hockey coach
- Brian Mason (American football), American football coach and player
