= Brian Fallon (disambiguation) =

Brian Fallon (born 1980), is an American singer, songwriter, and guitarist.

Brian Fallon may also refer to:

- Brian Fallon (critic) (1933–2026), Irish art critic
- Brian Fallon (press secretary) (born 1981/1982), press secretary for the 2016 Hillary Clinton presidential campaign
