= Brian O'Halloran (disambiguation) =

Brian O'Halloran (born 1969) is an American actor.

Brian O'Halloran may also refer to:

- Brian O'Halloran (Australian footballer) (1937–2021), Australian rules footballer
- Brian O'Halloran (baseball) (born 1971), American baseball executive
- Brian O'Halloran (hurler) (born 1991), Irish sportsman
