= Brian Robertson =

Brian Robertson may refer to:

- Brian Robertson, 1st Baron Robertson of Oakridge (1896–1974), British World War II general, later chairman of the British Transport Commission
- Brian James (guitarist) (Brian Graham Robertson, 1951–2025), English punk rock guitarist formerly of The Damned and The Lords of the New Church
- Brian Robertson (guitarist) (born 1956), Scottish guitarist
- BA Robertson (Brian Alexander Robertson), Scottish musician and songwriter
- Brian Robertson (rugby union) (born 1959), Scottish rugby union player and coach
- Brian Robertson (filmmaker), Canadian film and television producer and director
- Brian Robertson (born 1979), American trombonist with the band Suburban Legends

== See also ==
- Bryan Robertson (1925–2002), English curator and arts manager
- Robertson (surname)
- Brian Roberts (disambiguation)
