= Brian Flynn (cricketer) =

Australian cricketer (1929–1986)

Personal information
- Born: 7 June 1929; Sydney, New South Wales, Australia
- Died: 3 August 1986 (aged 57); Darwin, Northern Territory, Australia
- Source: Cricinfo, 3 October 2020

Brian Flynn (7 June 1929 – 3 August 1986) was an Australian cricketer. He played in fifteen first-class matches for Queensland between 1952 and 1956.

== See also ==
- List of Queensland first-class cricketers
