= Brian Bennett (footballer) =

Australian rules footballer

Personal information
- Full name: Brian Ward Bennett
- Born: 15 June 1937; Melbourne
- Died: 20 October 2025 (aged 88)
- Original team: Woomelang
- Height: 184 cm (6 ft 0 in)
- Weight: 79 kg (174 lb)

Playing career^{1}
Years	Club	Games (Goals)
1960–62	South Melbourne	40 (26)
- ^{1} Playing statistics correct to the end of 1962.

Brian Ward Bennett (15 June 1937 – 20 October 2025) was an Australian rules footballer who played with South Melbourne in the Victorian Football League (VFL).
