= Brian Barczyk =

American YouTuber (1969–2024)

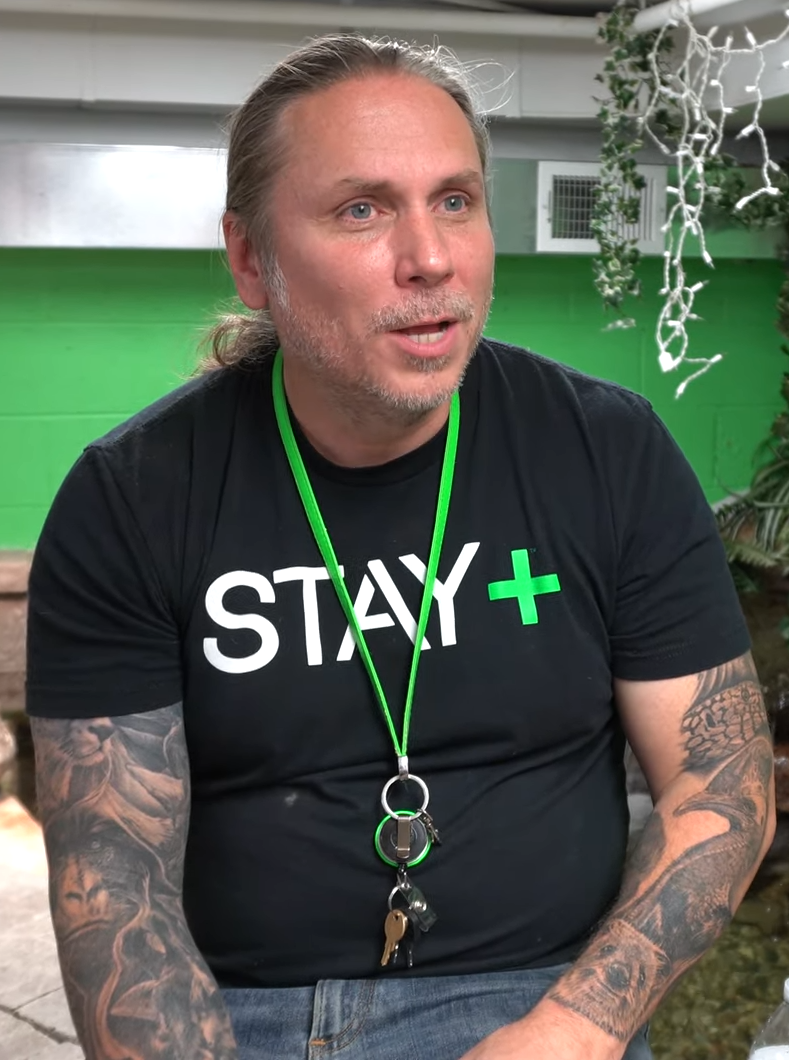
- Barczyk in 2019
- Born: September 6, 1969; Detroit, Michigan, U.S.
- Died: January 14, 2024 (aged 54); Warren, Michigan, U.S.

YouTube information
- Channel: Brian Barczyk
- Years active: 2008–2024
- Subscribers: 5.72 million
- Views: 2 billion
- Last updated: December 1, 2025

Brian Henry Barczyk (September 6, 1969 – January 14, 2024) was an American reptile enthusiast, YouTuber, and founder of the Reptarium Reptile Zoo and Legasea Aquarium. He was also featured as a star on the TV series Venom Hunters by the Discovery Channel. Barczyk had the third-largest collection of snakes in the world, with over 30,000 snakes, and assisted with venom milking. He was in the band Cemetery from 1984 to 1986 they released one demo in 1985: Called Up from the Grave. He played Bass on the demo.

== Early life and career ==
Brian Henry Barczyk was born on September 6, 1969. He grew fascinated with animals from a trip to the zoo at the age of two. Thereafter, Barczyk continued practicing his love for animals, specifically reptiles. He appeared on YouTube beginning in 2008, and starred on channels such as SnakeBytesTV. He collaborated with other YouTubers such as Jake Paul, Logan Paul, Marshmello, Liza Koshy, MrBeast, Coyote Peterson, and David Dobrik.

== Personal life ==
In 1992, Barczyk married Lori Ann Herman; they had two children, Noah and Jade. All have an active interest in reptiles.

=== Illness and death ===
In 2023, Barczyk was diagnosed with inoperable pancreatic cancer, which he revealed on his vlog. On January 5, 2024, he publicly stated that he would be entering hospice care. He died nine days later at his home in Michigan, at the age of 54.
