= Brian Tyler (disambiguation) =

Brian Tyler (born 1972) is an American composer.

Brian Tyler may also refer to:

- Brian Tyler (actor) (born 1953), American actor known for The Warriors
- Brian Tyler (racing driver) (born 1967), American auto racing driver
