= Brian Miller =

Brian Miller may refer to:

- Brian A. Miller, American television producer
- Brian D. Miller (attorney), American attorney
- Brian Miller (actor) (born 1941), British actor
- Brian Miller (Australian politician) (1921–2014), member of the Tasmanian Legislative Council
- Brian Miller (baseball) (born 1995)
- Brian Miller (footballer) (1937–2007), former professional footballer and England international
- Brian Miller (musician), musician in the band Isotope
- Brian Miller (New York politician), member of the New York State Assembly
- Brian Miller (Still Standing)
- Brian S. Miller (born 1967), U.S. federal judge

== See also ==
- Brian Millar (born 1966), Irish cricketer
- Bryan Miller (disambiguation)
