= Brian Walsh =

Brian Walsh may refer to:

- Brian Walsh (English footballer) (1932–2001), English footballer
- Brian Walsh (footballer, born 1934) (1934–2010), Australian rules footballer for St Kilda
- Brian Walsh (footballer, born 1951) (1951–2023), Australian rules footballer for Carlton and Essendon
- Brian Walsh (horseracing), Irish racehorse owner
- Brian Walsh (ice hockey) (born 1954), major league ice hockey player with the Calgary Cowboys
- Brian Walsh (judge) (1918–1998), Irish supreme court judge
- Brian Walsh (politician) (born 1972), Fine Gael politician and mayor of Galway
- Brian Walsh (rugby union) (born 1969), Irish rugby union player and coach
- Brian Walsh (television executive) (1955–2023), Australian media executive
- Brian Walsh (umpire) (born 1984), American umpire in Major League Baseball

== See also ==
- Brian Walshe, convicted of the murder of Ana Walshe
- Bryan Walsh, Australian politician
