= Brian Fletcher (disambiguation) =

Brian Fletcher (1947–2017) was an English jockey.

Brian Fletcher may also refer to:

- Brian Fletcher, drummer in Magnapop
- Corporal Brian Fletcher, character in North of 60
- Brian Fletcher (baseball), American baseball player
- Brian Fletcher (attorney), Principal Deputy Solicitor General of the United States

== See also ==
- Bryan Fletcher (disambiguation)
