= Denis Brian =

British journalist and writer (1923–2017)

Denis Brian (11 December 1923 – 30 May 2017) was a Welsh journalist and writer, notable for writing the 1996 biography Einstein: A Life.

Brian was born in Cardiff on 11 December 1923. He graduated from Ravensbourne School, Bromley in 1939 and then worked as a reporter for the Irish News Service in Fleet Street for two years. Upon reaching the age of eighteen, he joined the Royal Air Force; after two years' training (mostly in Canada) he became a Lancaster bomber pilot with the rank of flight lieutenant. He flew 36 missions and was awarded the DFC. After WWII he studied playwriting at the Royal Academy of Dramatic Art and several of his plays were produced in English theatres. In 1957 Brian emigrated to the United States, where he worked as a freelance writer and editor for several publications, including the Writer's Literary Agency. In the early 1960s he began writing books. His novel The love-minded received favourable reviews. In the 1970s he moved to West Palm Beach.

Brian died in Washington, D.C., on 30 May 2017, at the age of 93.

== Selected works ==
- Science and crime detection. 1960.
- The love-minded. 1968.
- Tallulah, darling: a biography of Tallulah Bankhead. 1972. 2nd edition, 1980
- Murderers and other friendly people: the public and private worlds of interviewers. 1973.
- Jeane Dixon: the witnesses. 1976.
- Murderers die. 1986.
- The true gen: an intimate portrait of Ernest Hemingway by those who knew him. 1988.
- The faces of Hemingway: intimate portraits of Ernest Hemingway by those who knew him. 1988.
- Fair game: what biographers don't tell you. 1994.
- Genius talk: conversations with Nobel scientists and other luminaries. 1995.
- Einstein: a life. 1996.
- Pulitzer: a life. 2001.
- The voice of genius: conversations with Nobel scientists and other luminaries. 2001.
- The Curies: a biography of the most controversial family in science. 2005.
- Sing Sing: the inside story of a notorious prison. 2005.
- The unexpected Einstein: the real man behind the icon. 2006.
- Seven lives of Colonel Patterson: how an Irish lion hunter led the Jewish Legion to victory; with an afterword by Alan Patterson. 2008.
- The elected and the chosen: why American presidents have supported Jews and Israel: from George Washington to Barack Obama. 2012.
