= Brian McBride (disambiguation) =

Brian McBride (born 1972), is an American soccer player.

Brian McBride may also refer to:

- Brian McBride (musician) (1970–2023), member of ambient music duo Stars of the Lid
- Brian McBride (businessman) (born 1955), president of the Confederation of British Industry

== See also ==
- Bryan McBride (born 1991), American track and field athlete
