= Brian Roberts =

Brian Roberts may refer to:

== Sportspeople ==
- Brian Roberts (Australian rules footballer) (1945–2016), Australian rules footballer
- Brian Roberts (English footballer) (born 1955), English football defender
- Brian Roberts (New Zealand footballer) (born 1967), New Zealand international footballer
- Brian Roberts (baseball) (born 1977), American baseball player
- Brian Roberts (soccer) (born 1982), American soccer player
- Brian Roberts (basketball) (born 1985), American basketball player

== Others ==
- Brian Birley Roberts (1912–1978), British polar expert, ornithologist and diplomat
- Brian Roberts (historian) (born 1930), British historian on South African history
- Brian L. Roberts (born 1959), American businessman, CEO of Comcast Corporation
- Brian K. Roberts, American television director

== See also ==
- Brian Robertson (disambiguation)
