= Brian Kabugi =

Kenyan actor (born 2000)

- Born: Brian Kabugi Kinuthia; 2 September 2000 (age 25); Nairobi, Kenya
- Other name: Real Bugi
- Occupation: Actor
- Years active: 2012–present

Brian Kabugi (born 2 September 2000) is a Kenyan actor best known for his performances as a child star on the Citizen TV series Machachari in 2012. He is known for playing different roles in Volume on Netflix and Salem on Showmax. Kabugi's film and television credits include Kina, Sleep, Dream Child and Teke.

== Early life and education ==
Kabugi was born on 2 September 2000 in Nairobi, Kenya. He was raised in Lang'ata Rubia and comes from a family of three, including his elder brother Daniel and their mother, who also served as his manager. He attended Cardinal Maurice Otunga High School in Nairobi.

== Career ==
Kabugi made his television debut at the age of 12 in the Citizen TV series Machachari, starting as an extra before joining the main cast. He left the show in 2017. He resumed acting in 2019 with a feature in Dream Child.

He played Benjamin Kibonge in Teke, another Kenyan TV series released in 2021. In 2022 he played Alfred Makau in Sleep before starting his role as Tito Karani in Salem, a Showmax TV series which also aired on Maisha Magic Plus from 2022 to 2024.

Volume is his latest feature in 2023 where he played Benja. Kabugi was among the main cast for the three episode Netflix TV limited series.

== Filmography ==
Year	Title	Role	Notes
2012–1017	Machachari	Kenny	Cast, television series
2019	Dream Child	Kevin	Cast
2021	Teke	Benjamin Kibonge	Cast, television series
2022–2024	Salem	Tito Karani	Cast, television series
2022	Sleep	Alfred Makau	Cast
2023	Volume	Benja	Cast, television series (3 episodes)

== Awards and nominations ==
Year	Award	Category	Show	Result	Ref
2022	Kalasha International Film and TV Awards	Best Supporting Actor in TV Drama	Salem	Nominated	
2023	Pulse Influencer Awards	Most Influential Actor	Volume	Won	
