= Brian Doyle (American writer) =

American writer (1956–2017)

- Born: Brian James Patrick Doyle; 1956; New York City, U.S.
- Died: May 2017 (aged 60); Lake Oswego, Oregon, U.S.
- Education: University of Notre Dame
- Occupation: Writer
- Spouse: Mary Miller Doyle
- Children: 3
- Writing career
- Notable awards: Pushcart Prize (x3)

Brian James Patrick Doyle (1956–2017) was an American writer. He was a recipient of the American Academy of Arts and Letters Award in Literature and three Pushcart Prizes.

He lived with his wife and three children in Lake Oswego, Oregon. In May 2017, he died at the age of 60 due to a brain tumor.

== Early life and career ==
He was born in 1956 in New York City to an Irish Catholic family. His mother, Ethel Clancey Doyle, was a teacher, and his father, James Doyle, was a journalist. Doyle credits becoming a writer to his father:

But in almost every class I am asked how I became a writer, and after I make my usual joke about it being a benign neurosis, as my late friend George Higgins once told me, I usually talk about my dad. My dad was a newspaperman, and still is, at age 92, a man of great grace and patience and dignity, and he taught me immensely valuable lessons. If you wish to be a writer, write, he would say. There are people who talk about writing and then there are people who sit down and type. Writing is fast typing. Also you must read like you are starving for ink. Read widely. Read everything. Read the Bible once a year or so, ideally the King James, to be reminded that rhythm and cadence are your friends as a writer. Most religious writing is terrible whereas some spiritual writing is stunning. The New Testament in the King James version, for example. —Brian Doyle, writing in The American Scholar (August 23, 2013)

He studied at the University of Notre Dame, where he graduated with a major in English in 1978.

Before moving to Oregon, Doyle worked at the U.S. Catholic and Boston College magazines. He later married artist Mary Miller. They would go on to have three children, a daughter and twin sons, who often inspired Doyle's work.

Doyle was also an editor of the University of Portland alumni magazine.

Doyle's essays and poems have appeared in magazines and journals such as The Atlantic Monthly, Harper's, The American Scholar, Orion, Commonweal, and The Georgia Review and in newspapers such as The Times of London, The Sydney Morning Herald, The Kansas City Star, The San Francisco Chronicle, The Ottawa Citizen, and Newsday. He was a book reviewer for The Oregonian and a contributing essayist to both Eureka Street magazine and The Age newspaper in Melbourne, Australia.

== Bibliography ==
=== Fiction ===
- Mink River (2010)
- Bin Laden's Bald Spot & Other Stories (2011)
- Cat's Foot (2012)
- The Plover (2014)
- Martin Marten (2015)
- Chicago (2016)
- The Mighty Currawongs & Other Stories (2016)
- The Adventures of John Carson in Several Quarters of the World: A Novel of Robert Louis Stevenson (2017)

=== Nonfiction ===
- Two Voices: A Father and Son Discuss Family and Faith (1996)
- Credo: Essays on Grace, Altar Boys, Bees, Kneeling, Saints, the Mass, Priests, Strong Women, Epiphanies, A Wake, and the Haunting Thin Energetic Dusty Figure of Jesus the Christ (1999) Saint Mary's Press Winona MN
- Saints Passionate and Peculiar: Brief Exuberant Essays for Teens (2002)
- Leaping: Revelations and Epiphanies (2003)
- Joyas Voladoras (2004)
- Spirited Men: Story, Soul & Substance (2004)
- The Wet Engine: Exploring the Mad Wild Miracle of the Heart (2005)
- The Grail: A Year Ambling and Shambling through an Oregon Vineyard in Pursuit of the Best Pinot Noir Wine in the Whole Wide World (2006)
- Grace Notes: True Stories about Sins, Sons, Shrines, Silence, Marriage, Homework, Jail, Miracles, Dads, Legs, Basketball, the Sinewy Grace of Women, Bullets, Music, Infirmaries, the Power of Powerlessness, the Ubiquity of Prayers, & Some Other Matters (2011)
- The Thorny Grace of It: And Other Essays for Imperfect Catholics (2013)
- Children & Other Wild Animals (2014)
- So Very Much the Best of Us: Songs of Praise in Prose (2015)
- Reading in Bed: Brief Headlong Essays about Books & Writers & Reading & Readers (2015)
- Eight Whopping Lies: And Other Stories of Bruised Grace (2017)
- Hoop: A Basketball Life in Ninety-Five Essays (2017)
- One Long River of Song: Notes on Wonder and the Spiritual and Nonspiritual Alike (2019)

=== Poetry ===
- Epiphanies & Elegies: Very Short Stories (2007)
- Thirsty for the Joy: Australian and American Voices (2008)
- A Shimmer of Something: Lean Stories of Spiritual Substance (2014)
- A Book of Uncommon Prayer: 100 Celebrations of the Miracle & Muddle of the Ordinary (2014)
- How the Light Gets In: And Other Headlong Epiphanies (2015)
- The Kind of Brave You Wanted to Be: Prose Prayers and Cheerful Chants against the Dark (2016)
