= Brian Wright (musician) =

American singer-songwriter

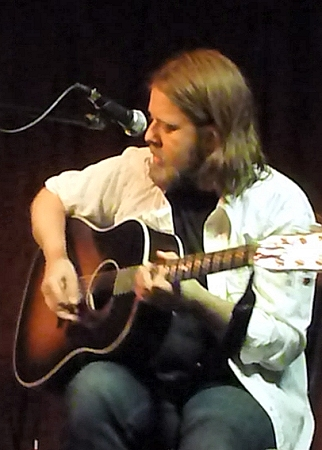

Background information
- Origin: Waco, Texas
- Genres: Singer-songwriter, rock
- Instruments: Electric guitar, acoustic guitar, baritone guitar, bass guitar, piano, mandolin, banjo, percussion, vocals
- Years active: 2006–present
- Label: Sugar Hill Records
- Website: brianwrightsongs.com

Brian Wright is an American singer-songwriter from Waco, Texas. His debut album Dog Ears was released in 2006, quickly followed by a sophomore effort, Bluebird in 2007. After signing with Sugar Hill Records, Wright has recorded two more albums, 2011's House on Fire and 2013's Rattle Their Chains.

== Career ==
Born in McLennan County, Texas, Brian Wright found music at the age of 13. He started as a drummer but found the guitar more to his liking (though he can play almost any instrument with keys or strings). Wright spent several years playing in Austin and Dallas bars before moving to Los Angeles in 2002 with his drummer. There they formed the band "Brian Wright and the Waco Tragedies." Several different music styles later, Wright settled on an infusion of folk, country, and rock music while defying all three. The album Dog Ears, in 2006, was his first release, followed soon thereafter by the album Bluebird in 2007. The band began to develop quite a following.

He signed with Sugar Hill Records and recorded his third album, House on Fire, which caught the eyes of many critics. While his first two albums were recorded in studio with a live band, Wright's third album fulfilled a lifelong dream of playing every instrument on the record. Marriage, fatherhood, and a move to Nashville in 2013 heavily influenced his release of Rattle Their Chains. The album was recorded, scrapped, re-done in an Oregon hotel, and then recorded again. Reviews have been quite good.

== Touring ==
Brian Wright was part of the 2004–2008 North America/European multi-artist "Hotel Café Tour". The Hotel Café series of tours included artists such as Imogen Heap, Katy Perry, Mandy Moore, The Weepies, Aqualung and Brett Dennen. In 2011 Wright paired with Jim Bianco for a summer tour in Europe, and in 2014 Brian Wright went on North American tours with The Milk Carton Kids and Joe Purdy. Starting in September 2015 Brian Wright will be joining Tom McRae on a European Tour.

== Discography ==
- Dog Ears (2006)
- Bluebird (2007)
- House on Fire (2011)
- Rattle Their Chains (2013)
