= Shooting of Brian Stack =

Killing of Brian Stack
- Location: Portlaoise Prison, Portlaoise, County Laois, Ireland
- Date: 25 March 1983; 43 years ago (shooting); 29 September 1984; 42 years ago (death)
- Attack type: Homicide by shooting
- Deaths: 1
- Victim: Brian Stack
- Perpetrator: Provisional Irish Republican Army members

The shooting of Brian Stack occurred on 25 March 1983. Stack was the chief prison officer at Portlaoise Prison, and he was shot in the neck by members of the Provisional IRA. He died after 18 months in hospital on 29 September 1984. He was the only officer in the Irish Prison Service to be killed in connection with the Troubles in Northern Ireland. Political controversy arose in 2016 around allegations that Gerry Adams, the leader of Sinn Féin, knew the identity of the killers.

== Shooting and death ==
Portlaoise Prison is the Republic of Ireland's high security prison and the place of detention for most of those convicted under the Offences against the State Act, including republican paramilitaries convicted in relation to the Troubles in Northern Ireland. As chief prison officer, Stack was responsible for reviewing security at the prison to prevent escape attempts. Stack's family later believed his efficacy in this role was what motivated his killers. In a 2013 statement, the IRA said "In Portlaoise a brutal prison regime saw prisoners and their families suffer greatly. This is the context in which IRA volunteers shot your father."

On 25 March 1983, Stack watched an Irish Amateur Boxing Association tournament in the National Stadium in Dublin. He was returning to his parked car on South Circular Road when he was shot in the neck from behind. The shooter escaped on a motorcycle driven by an accomplice. Stack was taken to hospital in a coma. He awoke with paraplegia and brain damage and remained in hospital until his death on 29 September 1984.

== Investigations ==
Brian Stack's son Austin, later a senior officer at Wheatfield Prison, has been critical of the initial criminal investigation carried out by the Garda Síochána (police). A 2007–08 cold case review led to a restart by the National Bureau of Criminal Investigation (NBCI); in 2015, the Irish Independent reported that the NBCI had interviewed a suspect now living in Spain and sent a file to the Director of Public Prosecutions.

The IRA initially denied involvement in the shooting. After Gerry Adams' 2013 meeting with Austin Stack, the IRA released a statement that its army council had conducted an internal investigation, determined that some of its members had carried out the shooting, and "disciplined" the perpetrators for acting without authorisation from their IRA superiors.

== Sinn Féin legacy ==
Austin Stack has campaigned for information about his father's killers. In 2013, he and his brother Oliver had several meetings with Gerry Adams. Austin Stack and Adams have given conflicting accounts of the number and locations of the meetings and who else was present at them. Adams claims the Stacks named two Sinn Féin members of the Oireachtas (parliament) whom they said the Garda suspected of involvement; Adams further claimed the two denied involvement when he questioned them. Stack claims he only asked for names and did not give any names to Adams.

In the run-up to the 2016 Irish general election, Stack was critical of Adams' 2013 actions. In December 2016, Adams made a "personal explanation" in the 32nd Dáil giving his version of the 2013 events; afterwards, Alan Farrell of Fine Gael used parliamentary privilege to suggest Martin Ferris and Dessie Ellis were the two Sinn Féin members alluded to. Both denied this and alleged Farrell was abusing privilege; Ellis noted that he was in prison at the time of the 1983 shooting.

In March 2018, Senator Máire Devine was suspended from Sinn Féin for three months for retweeting a parody Twitter account's tweet describing Brian Stack as a "sadist".

== Commemoration ==
On 3 May 2013, Alan Shatter, the Minister for Justice, attended a commemoration at the Midland Prison Centre in Portlaoise, where he unveiled a bust of Stack; renamed Beladd House, location of the Irish Prison Service College, as Brian Stack House; renamed the gold Merit Medal, the Irish Prison Service's highest honour, as the Stack Medal; and presented the first Stack Medal to Brian Stack's widow.

== See also ==
- List of unsolved murders (1980–1999)
