= Bryan (surname) =

Bryan is a surname found in the English-speaking world.

This surname has several different origins. One origin of the name is from an Anglo-Norman name, de Brionne, derived from either of two places called Brionne in the north of France—one is Brionne, in Eure; the other is Brionne in Creuse. It may also come from de Brienne from Brienne-le-Château. Another origin of the surname is as a patronymic, being borne by someone who was son of an individual named Bryan. In addition to being found in Brittany, it was used among the Breton followers of the Normans who appear in England and Ireland. Alternatively, Bryan might be the anglicized form of the Irish surname O'Brien. The Irish spelling of the surname Brien, Brian or the Norman spelling Bryan would then have a much longer origin in Ireland than in Brittany, predating the Normans.

== People with the surname ==
=== A ===
- Albert Vickers Bryan (1899–1984), American judge
- Albert Vickers Bryan Jr. (1926–2019), American judge
- Albert Bryan Jr. (born 1968), American politician, Governor of the U.S. Virgin Islands
- Albertus Bryne (1620s–1668), aka Albert Bryan, English organist and composer
- Alfred Bryan (illustrator) (1852–1899), English illustrator
- Alfred Bryan (lyricist) (1871–1958), Canadian songwriter
- Arthur Bryan (1923–2011), British business executive
- Arthur Q. Bryan, American comedian
- Ashley Bryan (1923–2022), American author and illustrator

=== B ===
- Benjamin Bryan (1840–1914) English journalist, editor, writer, and activist
- Billy Bryan (born 1955), American football player
- Billy Bryan (baseball) (1938–2026), American former Major League Baseball catcher
- Bob Bryan (born 1978), American doubles tennis player with his twin brother Mike
- Bob Bryan (geologist), Australian geologist
- Brother Bryan, American Presbyterian minister

=== C ===
- C. D. B. Bryan (1936–2009), American author and journalist
- Cecil E. Bryan (1878–1951), American architect
- Charles Bryan (disambiguation)
- Charlie Bryan (1933–2013), American labor leader

=== D ===
- David Bryan, American musician
- Donald Bryan, American politician
- Dora Bryan, British actress

=== E ===
- Elizabeth Carew (c. 1500–1546), née Bryan, reputed mistress of Henry VIII and wife of his close friend, Nicholas Carew
- Elizabeth M. Bryan (1942–2008), British paediatrician
- Ernie Bryan, Welsh footballer

=== F ===
- Francis Bryan (1490–1550), English courtier and diplomat known as The Vicar of Hell, brother of Elizabeth
- Frank M. Bryan, professor of political science
- Frank Bryan (cricketer) (1853–1923), English cricketer

=== G ===
- Gary Bryan (born 1952), American DJ
- Gay Bryan, American long and triple jumper
- George Bryan (disambiguation)
- Godfrey Bryan (1902–1991), English cricketer
- Goode Bryan, American Civil War Confederate general
- Gordan Bryan (cricketer), Jamaican cricketer
- Gordon Bryan (1895–1957), British pianist

=== H ===
- Henderson Bryan, Barbadian cricketer
- Henry Francis Bryan, 17th governor of American Samoa
- Henry Hunter Bryan, American politician

=== I ===
- Inés Bryan, Dominican Republic medic and politician

=== J ===
- Jack Bryan, English cricketer
- James Bryan (disambiguation)
- Jane Bryan, American actress
- Jenny Bryan, Canadian professor and R developer
- Jimmy Bryan (1926–1960), American racing driver
- Joe Bryan (born 1993), English footballer
- John Bryan (disambiguation)
- Joseph Bryan (1773–1812), American politician
- Joseph Hunter Bryan (1782–1839), American politician
- Joseph M. Bryan (1896–1995), American businessman and philanthropist

=== K ===
- Karen Bryan, Speech therapist and deputy vice-chancellor of the University of Greenwich
- Kathleen Price Bryan, American philanthropist
- Kean Bryan, English footballer
- Kirk Bryan (geologist), American geologist
- Kirk Bryan (oceanographer) (born 1929), American oceanographer

=== L ===
- Lettice Bryan (1805–1877), American author
- Luke Bryan, American country music singer-songwriter

=== M ===
- Margaret Bryan (c. 1468–c. 1551/52), governess of Henry VIII's acknowledged children
- Mark Bryan (born 1967), American musician, a founding member, songwriter and lead guitarist of the band Hootie & the Blowfish
- Mark Bryan (veterinarian), New Zealand veterinarian and researcher
- Marvin Bryan, English footballer
- Michael Bryan (disambiguation)
- Mike Bryan (born 1978), American doubles tennis player with his twin brother Bob

=== N ===
- Nancy Anne Bryan (1930–2010), American philanthropist
- Nathan Bryan (North Carolina politician) (1748–1798), American politician
- Nathan Bryan (scientist) (born 1973), American biologist
- Nathan P. Bryan (1872–1935), American lawyer, judge and politician

=== P ===
- Paul Bryan (musician) (born 1967), American musician
- Paul Bryan (politician) (1913–2004), British politician

=== Q ===
- Quisi Bryan (born 1970), American murderer

=== R ===
- Rebecca Bryan, wife of Daniel Boone
- Richard Bryan, American politician
- Robert Bryan, (disambiguation)
- Ronnie Bryan (1898–1970), English cricketer

=== S ===
- Sabrina Bryan, American actress
- Samuel Bryan, American political writer
- Silas Bryan (1822–1880), American judge and politician

=== T ===
- Taven Bryan, American football player
- Thomas Bryan (disambiguation)

=== V ===
- Vincent P. Bryan, Canadian songwriter

=== W ===
- Wesley Bryan (born 1990), American professional golfer
- William Bryan (disambiguation)

=== Z ===
- Zach Bryan (born 1996), American singer
- Zachery Ty Bryan (born 1981), American actor

== See also ==
- Brian, given name and surname
- Bryan (given name)
