= Bryan (given name) =

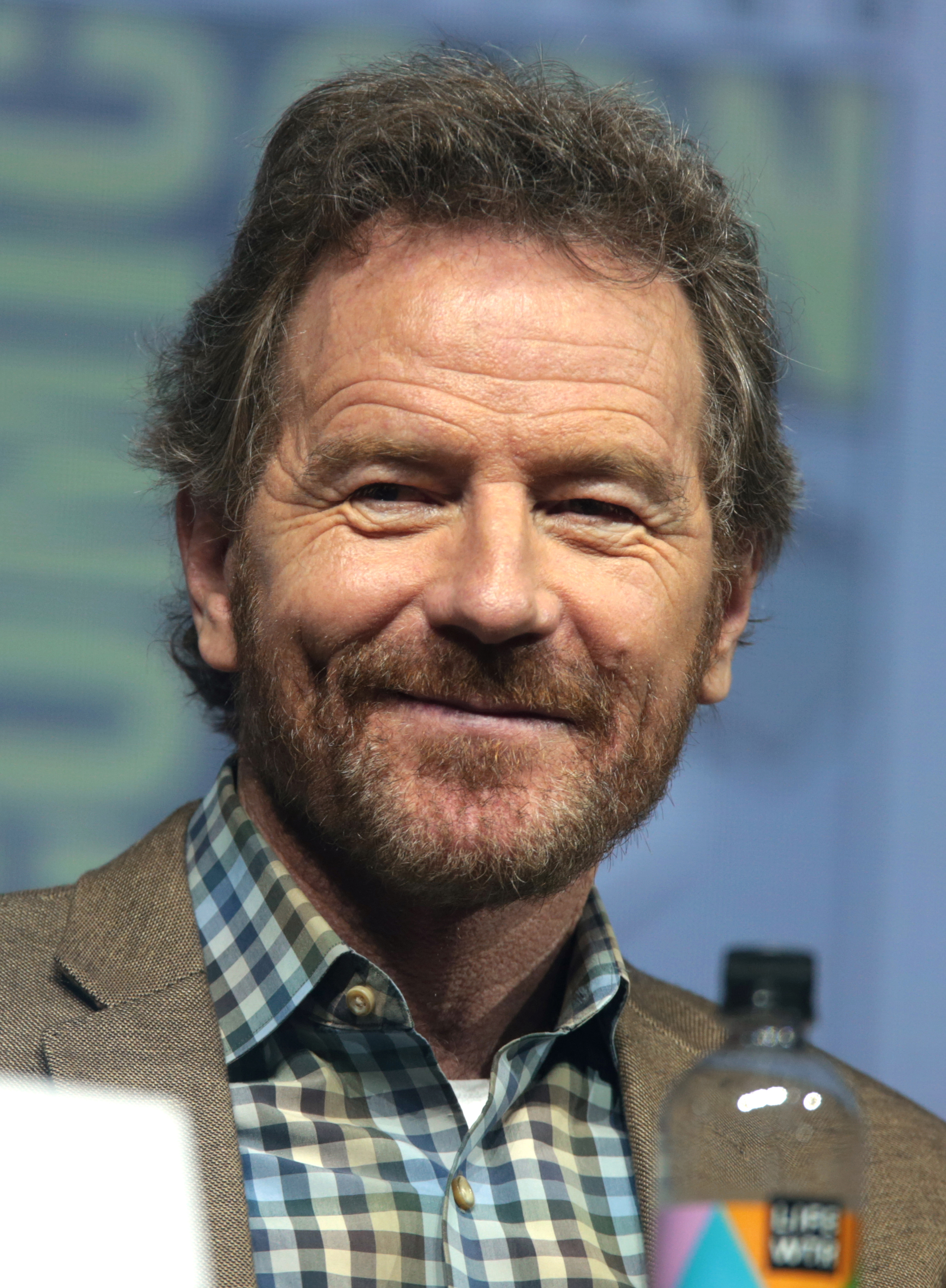
- Bryan Cranston in 2018
- Pronunciation: /ˈbraɪ.ən/
- Gender: Male

Origin
- Languages: Breton, Irish
- Meaning: "noble" or “giving”

Other names
- Variant form: Brian

Bryan is a masculine given name. It is a variant spelling of the masculine given name Brian.

== Origin and meaning ==
The given name Bryan is a variant of the given name Brian. Its spelling is influenced by the surname Bryan. The given name Brian is thought to be derived from an Old Celtic word meaning "high" or "noble".

== People with the name ==
- Bryan Adams (born 1959), Canadian musician
- Bryan Alberts (born 1994), American–Dutch basketball player
- Bryan Avery (1944–2017), British architect
- Bryan Breeding (born 1994), American singer
- Bryan Bresee (born 2001), American football player
- Bryan Brock, American football player
- Bryan Bronson, American hurdler
- Bryan Brown, Australian actor
- Bryan Clauson, American race car driver
- Bryan Cochrane, Canadian curler
- Bryan Cohen (born 1989), American-Israeli basketball player
- Bryan Coker, American academic administrator
- Bryan Cox (born 1968), American football player and coach
- Bryan Cranston, American actor
- Bryan Danielson, American professional wrestler
- Bryan Duncan, American singer
- Bryan Elsley, Scottish TV writer
- Bryan Engram, Canadian football player
- Bryan Erickson, lead singer of Velvet Acid Christ
- Bryan Fairfax (disambiguation), several people
- Bryan Faussett (1720–1776), English antiquary
- Bryan Ferry, English musician
- Bryan Fogarty, Canadian ice hockey player
- Bryan Forbes (1926–2013), English film director, screenwriter, film producer, actor, and novelist
- Bryan Fuller, American screenwriter and television producer
- Bryan Fury, a fictional Tekken fighting game series character
- Bryan Green, Tasmanian politician
- Bryan Habana (born 1983), South African rugby player
- Bryan Henderson (born 1977), American football player
- Bryan Herta, American race car driver and team owner
- Bryan Hextall, Canadian ice hockey player
- Bryan Ivie, American volleyball player
- Bryan King (Australian footballer) (born 1935), Australian rules footballer
- Bryan King (footballer, born 1947), English footballer
- Bryan King (politician) (born 1968), member of the Arkansas Senate
- Bryan Christopher Kohberger, American murderer and university staff member
- Bryan Lee-Lauduski, American football player
- Bryan Linssen (born 1990), Dutch footballer
- Bryan MacMahon (writer) (1909–1998), Irish writer
  - Bryan MacMahon (judge) (born 1941), Irish High Court judge, son of the writer
- Bryan Magdaleno (born 2001), Dominican baseball player
- Bryan Mbeumo (born 1999), French-born Cameroonian footballer
- Bryan Mone (born 1995), American football player
- Bryan Mosley, English actor, Coronation Street
- Bryan Lee O'Malley, Canadian cartoonist
- Bryan Posthumus (born c. 1985), American politician
- Bryan Ramos (footballer) (born 2001), Honduran football player
- Bryan Ramos (baseball) (born 2002), Cuban baseball player
- Bryan Reynolds (scholar), American critic and playwright
- Bryan Robson, English footballer
- Bryan Ruiz, Costa Rican footballer
- Bryan Rust, American ice hockey player
- Bryan Sammons (born 1995), American baseball player
- Bryan Scary, American musician
- Bryan Matthew Sevilla, American adult film actor, known by his stage name James Deen
- Bryan Singer, American film director
- Bryan Smithson, American basketball player
- Bryan Smyth, Irish singer
- Bryan Tepper, Canadian politician
- Bryan Thompson (disambiguation), multiple people
- Bryan Trottier, Canadian ice hockey player
- Bryan White (born 1974), American country music artist
- Brian Willsher (1930–2010), English sculptor
- Bryan Woo, American baseball player
- Bryan Yipp, Canadian biologist

== See also ==
- Brien
- Bryan (surname)
- Brayan, a masculine given name
