= INE =

INE, Ine or ine may refer to:

== Institutions ==
- Institut für Nukleare Entsorgung, a German nuclear research center
- Instituto Nacional de Estadística (disambiguation)
- Instituto Nacional Electoral, Mexico's public organization responsible for organizing federal elections
- Shanghai International Energy Exchange

== People ==
- Ine of Wessex (c. 670 – after 726), king of Wessex (688–726)
- Ine Barlie (born 1965), Norwegian sport wrestler
- Kusumoto Ine (1827–1903), Japanese physician
- Ine Gevers (born 1960), Dutch curator and writer
- Ine Hoem (born 1985), Norwegian jazz singer
- Ine ter Laak-Spijk (1931–2002). Dutch athlete
- Ine Lamers (born 1954), Dutch photographer and video installation artist
- Ine Poppe (born 1960), Dutch artist, journalist and writer
- Ine Schäffer (born 1923), Austrian athlete who competed mainly in the shot put
- Ine Eriksen Søreide (born 1976), Norwegian politician
- Ine Wannijn (born 1982), Belgian cyclist

== Places ==
- Ine, Kyoto, Japan
- İne, Kazan, Turkey

== Other uses ==
- -ine, a suffix used in chemistry
- Ince and Elton railway station, England
- Indo-European languages
- Ine Airport, on Arno Atoll, Marshall Islands

== See also ==
- Ines (disambiguation)
