= 1911 in Wales =

- Centuries: 18th; 19th; 20th; 21st
- Decades: 1890s; 1900s; 1910s; 1920s; 1930s
- See also: List of years in Wales; Timeline of Welsh history 1911 in The United Kingdom Scotland Elsewhere

This article is about the particular significance of the year 1911 to Wales and its people.

== Incumbents ==
- Archdruid of the National Eisteddfod of Wales – Dyfed
- Lord Lieutenant of Anglesey – Sir Richard Henry Williams-Bulkeley, 12th Baronet
- Lord Lieutenant of Brecknockshire – Joseph Bailey, 2nd Baron Glanusk
- Lord Lieutenant of Caernarvonshire – John Ernest Greaves
- Lord Lieutenant of Cardiganshire – Herbert Davies-Evans
- Lord Lieutenant of Carmarthenshire – Sir James Williams-Drummond, 4th Baronet
- Lord Lieutenant of Denbighshire – William Cornwallis-West
- Lord Lieutenant of Flintshire – Hugh Robert Hughes (until 29 April); William Glynne Charles Gladstone (from 8 July)
- Lord Lieutenant of Glamorgan – Robert Windsor-Clive, 1st Earl of Plymouth
- Lord Lieutenant of Merionethshire – Sir Osmond Williams, 1st Baronet
- Lord Lieutenant of Monmouthshire – Godfrey Morgan, 1st Viscount Tredegar
- Lord Lieutenant of Montgomeryshire – Sir Herbert Williams-Wynn, 7th Baronet
- Lord Lieutenant of Pembrokeshire – Frederick Campbell, 3rd Earl Cawdor (until 8 February); John Philipps, 1st Viscount St Davids (from 21 March)
- Lord Lieutenant of Radnorshire – Powlett Milbank
- Bishop of Bangor – Watkin Williams
- Bishop of Llandaff – Joshua Pritchard Hughes
- Bishop of St Asaph – A. G. Edwards (later Archbishop of Wales)
- Bishop of St Davids – John Owen

== Events ==
- February–April - A Welsh Nationalist League is founded, based in Caernarfonshire, to campaign for Home Rule.
- 23 June - The future Edward VIII is created Prince of Wales by his father, George V.
- July - Dockers' strike action at Cardiff culminates in rioting. Five hundred troops are drafted into the area.
- 13 July - Prince Edward (later Edward VIII) is invested as Prince of Wales in a ceremony at Caernarfon Castle, devised by David Lloyd George.
- 14 July - New buildings of the University College of North Wales, Bangor, opened.
- 23 July - King George V and Queen Mary lay the foundation stone of the new National Library of Wales in Aberystwyth.
- 29 July - Mawddwy Railway formally reopened, worked by the Cambrian Railways.
- August - Rioting in Bargoed, Brynamman, Ebbw Vale and Tredegar. Jewish-owned businesses are attacked and troops brought in.
- 19 August - Llanelli riots: During demonstrations in support of a national railway strike (17–20 August), two men are shot dead by soldiers of the Worcestershire Regiment in Llanelli. Magistrates' homes are attacked and four more of the crowd are killed outright when explosive material stored on railway property ignites.
- 21 August–5 December - A strike at the British Wagon Company's Swansea works leads to rioting in September–October.
- 4 September - Members of the South Wales Miners' Federation return to work after a ten-month strike against colliery owners in the Cambrian Combine which triggered the Tonypandy riots, having accepted the 2s 3d per ton payment rate negotiated prior to the strike by William Abraham.
- 16 December - The Imperial Copyright Act (coming into effect in 1912) entitles the National Library of Wales to be given by legal deposit a copy of all British publications in specified categories, based on a memorandum drafted by Daniel Lleufer Thomas.

== Arts and literature ==
=== Awards ===
- National Eisteddfod of Wales - held in Carmarthen
  - Chair - William Roberts, "Iorwerth VII"
  - Crown - William Crwys Williams

=== New books ===
- Edward Morgan Humphreys - Dirgelwch yr Anialwch ("Mystery of the Desert")
- Sir John Edward Lloyd – A History of Wales from the Earliest Times to the Edwardian Conquest
- John Ward – The Roman Era in Britain

== Drama ==
- Beriah Gwynfe Evans & Robert BryanGlyndŵr: Tywysog Cymru

=== Music ===
- Sir Henry Walford Davies - Symphony in G

== Sport ==
- Boxing - Freddie Welsh loses his British lightweight title to Matt Wells.
- Horse racing - Jack Anthony wins the Grand National for the first time, on "Glenside".
- Rugby league - Merthyr Tydfil RLFC fold after four seasons.
- Rugby union - Wales win their third Grand Slam.

== Births ==
- 5 February - Dai Francis, miners’ leader (died 1981)
- 27 March - Alwyn D. Rees, writer (died 1974)
- 13 April - Len Richards, footballer (died 1985)
- 26 May - Gwilym Tilsley, poet and archdruid (died 1997)
- 30 June - Alfred Janes, artist (died 1999)
- 23 July - Idris Foster, academic (died 1984)
- 29 August - Raymond Bark-Jones, Wales international rugby player
- 2 September - Jack Petersen, boxer (died 1990)
- 4 September - John Robert Jones, philosopher (died 1970)
- 12 October - Iorrie Isaacs, Wales international rugby player (died 1966)
- 12 November - Pennar Davies, clergyman and author (died 1996)
- 20 November - Bernard Cowey, Wales international rugby union player (died 1997)
- 7 December - John Gwyn Griffiths, academic (died 2004)

== Deaths ==
- 8 February - Frederick Campbell, 3rd Earl Cawdor, politician, Lord Lieutenant of Pembrokeshire, 63
- 3 March - Jacob Thomas, Victoria Cross recipient, 78
- 29 April - Hugh Robert Hughes, genealogist, 83
- 12 July - Harry Day, Wales international rugby player, 47
- 13 August - Thomas Thomas, boxer, 31 (pneumonia)
- 18 August - Henry James, 1st Baron James of Hereford, politician, 82
- 28 August - Jack Williams, Wales international rugby player, 28
- 4 September - Tom Hurry Riches, steam locomotive engineer, 64
- 12 September - Arthur John Williams, politician, 77
- 30 September - John David Davies, churchman, wood-carver and antiquarian, 80
- 3 October - William Tudor Howell, lawyer and politician, 48
- 14 November - Robert Davies Roberts, scientist and author, 60
- 6 December - Pryce Lewis, detective and spy, 80 (suicide)
- 11 December - Rowland Ellis, bishop, 70

== See also ==
- 1911 in Ireland
