= Third Presbyterian Church =

Third Presbyterian Church may refer to:

in the United States

- Third Presbyterian Church (Birmingham, Alabama)
- Third Presbyterian Church (Chester, Pennsylvania)
- Third Presbyterian Church (Springfield, Ohio), listed on the National Register of Historic Places (NRHP)
- Third Presbyterian Church (Greenville, South Carolina)
- Third Presbyterian Church Parsonage, Salt Lake City, Utah, NRHP-listed
