= Frank Bryan =

Frank Bryan may refer to:

- Frank M. Bryan, professor of political science at the University of Vermont
- Frank Bryan (cricketer) (1853–1923), English cricketer
