= James Bryan =

James Bryan may refer to:

- James Bryan (mining executive) (1789–1822), Missouri mining entrepreneur
- James W. Bryan (Louisiana politician) (1834–1897), American politician from Louisiana
- James W. Bryan (1874–1956), U.S. Representative from Washington
- James William Bryan (1853–1903), Lieutenant Governor of Kentucky
- James E. Bryan (1909–2007), American librarian
- Brother Bryan (1863–1941), American religious figure
- Jimmy Bryan (1926–1960), American racecar driver
- Jim Bryan (1931–2009), player and maker of the Northumbrian smallpipes
- James Bryan (MP) for Hastings
- James Bryan McCollum aka James Bryan, Canadian musician, songwriter and music producer
