= Ines =

Ines or INES may refer to:

== People ==
- Ines (name), a feminine given name, also written as Inés or Inês
- Saint Ines or Agnes (c. 291 – c. 304), Roman virgin–martyr
- Eda-Ines Etti (stage name: Ines; born 1981), Estonian singer

== Places ==
- Doña Ines, a volcano in Chile
- Institute of Applied Sciences Ruhengeri, a Rwandan university

== Science and technology ==
- International Network of Engineers and Scientists for Global Responsibility
- International Nuclear Event Scale

== Other uses ==
- iNES (TV service), a Romanian IPTV television streaming service
- Carte d'identité nationale électronique sécurisée, proposed French national identity card
- Ines Fujin, a Japanese Thoroughbred racehorse

== See also ==
- INE (disambiguation)
- Santa Ines (disambiguation)
