= Ines (name) =

Female given name

Ines, and variants, is a feminine given name related to Agnes.

Used alone it may refer to:

- Saint Ines (Agnes of Rome; c. 291 – c. 304), virgin–martyr, saint
- Ines (Eda-Ines Etti; born 1981), Estonian singer

== As a first name ==
- Inês Aguiar (born 1998), Portuguese actress
- Inés Alberdi (born 1948), Spanish sociologist
- Inés Ayala (born 1957), Spanish politician
- Inés Arrondo (born 1977), Argentine field hockey player
- Ines Aru (born 1939), Estonian actress
- Inés Bryan, Dominican Republic medic and politician
- Ines Castellani Fantoni Benaglio (1849–1897) Italian writer, countess
- Inês de Castro (1325–1355), Galician noblewoman, wife of King Peter I of Portugal
- Ines Catron Hoffmann (1905–1994), American lawyer
- Inés Coronel Barreras (b. 1968), a male Mexican drug trafficker
- Inés de Hinojosa (1540–1571), Venezuelan hacendada
- Ines Diers (born 1963), German swimmer
- Inés Echeverría (1868–1949), Chilean writer
- Inés Efron (born 1985), Argentine actress
- Inés Ferrer Suárez (born 1990), Spanish tennis player
- Inès de La Fressange (born 1957), French model and fashion designer
- Inés García de Durán (1928–2011), Colombian folklorist
- Inés Gaviria (born 1979), Colombian singer
- Ines Geißler (born 1963), German swimmer
- Inés González Árraga (born 1973), Venezuelan political prisoner
- Inés Gorrochategui (born 1973), Argentine tennis player
- Inés de Guerrico Eguses (Sor María Jacinta; 1793–1840), Argentine nun, writer
- Ines Eichmüller (born 1980), German politician
- Inês Henriques (born 1980), Portuguese race walker
- Inès Ligron (born 1962), French fashion and beauty expert
- Ines Maričić (born 1988), Croatian 9 pin bowling player
- Inés Melchor (born 1986), Peruvian long-distance runner
- Inés Mendoza (1908–1990), Puerto Rican teacher, writer and socialite, the First Lady
- Inés Molina, Argentine actress
- Inês Monteiro (born 1980), Portuguese runner
- Ines Müller (born 1959), German shot putter
- Inés Palombo (born 1985), Argentine actress and model
- Ines Paulke (1958–2010), German singer
- Ines Pellegrini (born 1954), Eritrean-Italian actress
- Inés Puyó (1906–1996), Chilean painter
- Ines Putri (born 1989), Indonesian beauty pageant
- Inés Remersaro (born 1992), Uruguayan swimmer
- Inés Rivero (born 1975), Argentine model
- Inés Rodena (1905–1985), Cuban radio and television writer
- Ines Saborowski (born 1967), German politician
- Inés Sainz (born c. 1978), Mexican journalist
- Inés Sánchez (1931–2023), Cuban-Costa Rican journalist
- Inés Sastre (born 1973), Spanish model and actress
- Ines Schmidt (born 1960), German politician
- Ines Schulz (born 1965), German heptathlete
- Ines Schwerdtner (born 1989), German politician
- Inés de Suárez (c. 1507–1580), Spanish conquistadora
- Ines Torelli (1931–2019), Swiss comedian, radio personality, and stage, voice and film actress
- Inés de la Torre (fl. 1618), Spanish courtier
- Ines Uusmann (born 1948), Swedish politician

== As a middle name ==
- María Inés (María Inés Guerra Núñez; born 1983), Mexican TV-hostess, actress and singer
- Sor Juana Inés de la Cruz, O.S.H.(12 November 1651 – 17 April 1695) New Spain (current Mexico) nun and poet

== See also ==
- Ines (disambiguation)
- Inez
