= John Bryan =

John Bryan is the name of the following people:

- John Bryan (MP for City of London) (died 1418)
- John Bryan (MP for Plymouth) (by 1487–1524 or later), MP for Plymouth
- John Bryan (ejected minister) (died 1676), Puritan ejected by the Act of Uniformity 1662
- John Heritage Bryan (1798–1870), U.S. Representative from North Carolina
- John Neely Bryan (1810–1877), Presbyterian farmer, lawyer, and founder of the city of Dallas, Texas
- John Bryan (art director) (1911–1969), Academy Award-winning art director
- John Bryan (journalist) (1934–2007), newspaper publisher
- John Bryan (diplomat), high commissioner of the Cook Islands
- John H. Bryan (1936–2018), CEO of the Sara Lee Corporation
- John Bryan (cricketer) (1841–1909), English cricketer
- John Bryan (footballer) (1877–1940), English footballer
- John A. Bryan (1794–1864), American diplomat and politician from New York and Ohio
- Jack Bryan (1896–1985), English cricketer
- John Stewart Bryan (1871–1944), president of the College of William and Mary, 1934–1942
- John Bryan (Wesleyan Methodist minister) (1776–1856), Welsh Wesleyan Methodist minister
- John Letcher Bryan (1848–1898), American politician, mayor of Orlando, Florida
- John Melvin Bryan Sr. (1886–1940), printer and political figure in British Columbia
- John Melvin Bryan Jr. (1912–1992), Canadian politician
- John Bryan, drummer with The Whirling Dervishes
