= 1946 Greenville propane explosion =

Explosion in Greenville, South Carolina

- Date: 19 November 1946
- Time: Approximately 18:00 EST (1:00 UTC)
- Location: Ideal Laundry, Greenville, South Carolina; 34.8603°N 82.4066°W
- Cause: Propane tank leak
- Deaths: 6
- Injuries: 150+

The 1946 Greenville propane explosion occurred on 19 November 1946, at the Ideal Laundry in Greenville, South Carolina. A tank containing around 3,500 US gallons (13 m^{3}) of propane exploded around 6 PM, after leaking vapors were ignited by the boilers in the basement. The blast, which killed 6 people and injured over 150, was felt as far away as Gaffney, 50 miles to the northeast.

== Explosion ==
Ideal Laundry and Cleaners was located at the corner of Buncombe and Echols Streets on the northeastern side of Greenville. The laundry's boilers had earlier been powered by coal. Greenville city officials pressured the company to reduce its smoke pollution for several years prior to World War II, leading the plant's manager, E.R. Haynie, to investigate propane as an alternative fuel in the summer of 1946. Haynie toured several industrial plants where Superior Gas Corporation had installed large propane systems, and was satisfied with their efficiency. Superior Gas installed a 500-US-gallon (1.9 m^{3}) propane tank at Haynie's personal residence several months before installing a 6,500-US-gallon (25 m^{3}) system at Ideal Laundry in November, 1946.

In the afternoon of November 19, several days after the switch from coal to propane, the tank had been filled to approximately half of its capacity when a leak in the system was noticed. Haynie ordered the building evacuated and ran to the fire department a block away; superintendent J. Carl Trammel remained inside and directed the evacuation of Ideal Laundry employees. At approximately 6 PM, minutes after the leak was noticed, the propane leaking into the basement of Ideal Laundry had reached the critical air–fuel ratio between 2.4 to 9.5 percent, and was ignited by the boilers.

The explosion demolished all but one corner of the Ideal Laundry building, and according to a Red Cross survey the following day, it destroyed nearly 20 nearby structures, most houses of African Americans. The Third Presbyterian Church across the street was one of approximately 50 other buildings that were severely damaged. Over 150 people were injured, and several dozen were admitted to local hospitals, but there were only six fatalities. Superintendent Trammel and three Ideal Laundry employees, Mary Brown, Geraldine Simpson, and Mamie Earle, all of them Black women, were killed before they could evacuate the building. One firefighter was also killed, as was a visitor who was assisting in the evacuation. Five minutes after the explosion, the remaining propane fueled a fire that reached nearly 600 feet into the air. The fire and explosion were witnessed for over 50 miles, including in Caesar's Head, Easley, Gaffney, Greer, and Liberty.

== Aftermath ==
In addition to firefighters from across Greenville County, soldiers from Greenville Army Air Base were mobilized to prevent looting. Injured citizens, some of whom had been buried in rubble or thrown from their houses, were assisted to hospitals. Severe traffic jams occurred into the night as the curious attempted to drive into Greenville.

Two federal officials from the United States Bureau of Mines in Pittsburgh assisted Greenville police and Ideal Laundry officials in investigating the cause of the explosion. It was determined that the propane system was improperly constructed and installed, resulting in the gas leak. The report urged that large propane tanks be kept further away from populated areas, that automatic or remote shut-off valves be installed on them, and that new systems be inspected by an impartial qualified agency before first use.

The Superior Gas Corporation engineer who oversaw the installation of the system at Ideal Laundry committed suicide shortly after the release of the report, and the company declared bankruptcy.

Several homeowners filed suit against Ideal Laundry, seeking compensation for the destruction of their houses. In 1949, Ideal Laundry was held not responsible; the bankrupt Superior Gas Corporation was held to be the responsible party because it had been contracted to install the propane system and was still overseeing it at the time of the explosion.

== See also ==
- Cleveland East Ohio Gas explosion
- Third Presbyterian Church (Greenville, South Carolina)
