= James W. Bryan =

American politician (1874–1956)

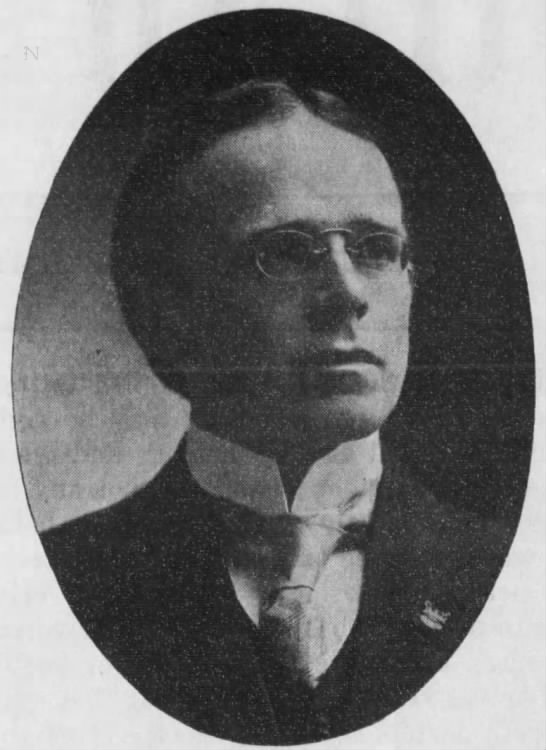

Member of the U.S. House of Representatives from Washington's at-large district
- In office March 4, 1913 – March 3, 1915
- Preceded by: office established
- Succeeded by: office abolished

Member of the Washington State Senate from the 23rd district
- In office 1909–1913
- Preceded by: Richard Condon
- Succeeded by: Peter Iverson

Personal details
- Born: James Wesley Bryan; March 11, 1874 Lake Charles, Louisiana, U.S.
- Died: August 26, 1956 (aged 82) Seattle, Washington, U.S.
- Resting place: Forest Lawn Cemetery
- Party: Republican; Progressive
- Spouse: Lorena Kearse (m. 1899)
- Children: 3
- Parent: James W. Bryan (father)
- Education: Lake Charles College; Baylor University; Yale Law School
- Occupation: Politician; lawyer

James Wesley Bryan (March 11, 1874 – August 26, 1956) was a U.S. Representative from Washington state.

== Early life ==
James Wesley Bryan was born on March 11, 1874, in Lake Charles in Calcasieu Parish, Louisiana, to James W. Bryan Sr. His father served in the Confederate Army as a captain and was mayor of Lake Charles and a state legislator. Bryan attended public schools and Lake Charles College. He graduated in 1895 from Baylor University. He then studied at Yale Law School until his father's death took him back to Louisiana. He continued to study law at an office in Lakes Charles and was admitted to the bar in 1898 or 1900, sources differ. He volunteered to serve in the Spanish-American War, but was rejected due to impaired eyesight.

== Career ==
Bryan started practicing law in Lake Charles. In 1904 or 1905, he moved to Bremerton, Washington, and continued practicing law there. He was the Bremerton city attorney in 1907, 1908, and 1911. As city attorney, he successfully campaigned for municipal ownership of the Bremerton water supply system and waterfront dock. He served as a member of the Washington State Senate from 1908 to 1912. He was affiliated with the law firms Bryan & Ingle, Bryan & Best, and Bryan & Garland. He then sold his law practice.

Bryan was elected as a Progressive to the Sixty-third Congress (March 4, 1913 – March 3, 1915). He was the first to represent Washington's at-large congressional district. He introduced a bill for government ownership of railroads, but it was defeated. He was an unsuccessful candidate for renomination to the new 1st district seat in 1914 to the Sixty-fourth Congress. He sued his opponent Clarance B. Blethen and his publication The Seattle Times for their characterization of him in cartoons and editorials during the congressional race and Bryan settled out of court.

Bryan owned and published the weekly newspaper The Navy Yard American from 1915 to 1917. After resuming his law practice, he was prosecuting attorney of Kitsap County from 1926 to 1930. He was opposed to liquor and gambling and had a feud with sheriff John Stanioch. He published leaflets titled The Broad Axe that shared his views. From 1933 to 1936, he was the president of the Bremerton Port Commission. He sold his share of his law partnership to James Arthur following Arthur's return from World War II. He then returned to practice law with his son James W. Jr. in 1950. He practiced law in Bremerton until his death. Later in his career, he argued against the purchase of private power facilities by districts with public utilities. He was chairman of the Kitsap County Public Utility District.

== Personal life ==
Bryan married Lorena Kearse of San Angelo, Texas, on March 26, 1899. They had one son and two daughters, James W., Billie, and Merlaine. In the 1920s, Bryan bought a home on Washington Avenue in Bremerton. He was a member of the First Methodist Church, the Fraternal Order of Eagles, and Kiwanis. He was friends with U.S. senator Homer Bone.

Bryan died on August 26, 1956, at the Swedish Hospital in Seattle. He was cremated and interred in Forest Lawn Cemetery.

U.S. House of Representatives
Preceded by N/A	Member of the U.S. House of Representatives from Washington's at-large congressional district 1913–1915	Succeeded by N/A
