= Joab Hoisington =

American Revolution patriot (1736–1777)

- Born: September 16, 1736; Farmington, Connecticut Colony, British America
- Died: February 28, 1777 (aged 40) Newbury, Vermont Republic
- Buried: Oxbow Cemetery, Newbury, Vermont
- Allegiance: Connecticut Colony; Vermont Republic; New York
- Branch: Connecticut Militia; Vermont Militia; New York Militia
- Service years: 1755–1757; 1770s
- Rank: Colonel
- Commands: Upper Regiment, Vermont Militia; Hoisington's Rangers
- Known for: Founder, Windsor, Vermont; Founder, Woodstock, Vermont
- Conflicts: French and Indian War; American Revolutionary War
- Spouse: Mary Boardman (m. 1759–1777, his death)
- Children: 9
- Other work: Farmer; Land speculator Mill owner Tavern and inn owner

Joab Hoisington (September 19, 1736 – February 28, 1777) was a militia officer on the Patriot side in the American Revolution. He was a founder of Windsor, Vermont and Woodstock, Vermont. Hoisington was most notable as a militia leader during the Revolution, including command of the Upper Regiment of Vermont Militia and an irregular unit known as Hoisington's Rangers.

== Biography ==
Joab Hoisington was born in Farmington, Connecticut on September 19, 1736, the son of John Hoisington and Sarah (Temple) Hoisington. In 1755, he joined the Connecticut Militia for the French and Indian War. As a private in the 5th Company of the 1st Regiment, he served on active duty in Upstate New York for most of 1755, including the British expedition against the French at Fort Saint-Frédéric. He took part in the 1756 expedition against the fort, this time as a corporal and sergeant in the 6th Company of the 2nd Regiment. Hoisington performed 18 days of militia service in 1757 as a member of Captain Eldad Lewis' Company. This unit was part of an unsuccessful British response to the siege of Fort William Henry, New York; after a successful siege, the French destroyed the fort and withdrew to Canada.

When Vermont began to attract white settlers in the 1760s, Hoisington was an original settler of Windsor. Hoisington became a major landholder in Windsor and operated a successful farm.

In 1772, he became a resident of Woodstock, and he served as Woodstock's first town clerk. He was also elected to other local offices at Woodstock's first town meeting, including treasurer, assessor, one of the overseers of the poor, and one of the overseers of highways. In Woodstock, Hoisington farmed, speculated in land, operated a saw mill and grist mill, and owned a tavern and inn.

In 1774, Hoisington attended a committee of correspondence convention in Westminster, Vermont, and afterwards he was identified with the Patriot cause. He was an experienced militia officer, and served as a captain and commander of a company in the Upper Regiment of Vermont Militia, and he later commanded the regiment as a colonel.

In July 1776, Hoisington joined the New York Militia as commander of an irregular unit, Hoisington's Rangers. (Note: At the time of the American Revolution, authority over Vermont was contested by the colonial governments of New Hampshire and New York, and by Vermont residents who had purchased land grants from New Hampshire and refused to purchase confirmatory titles from New York.) Appointed as a major by the New York Provincial Congress, he assembled his unit in White Plains, New York. After organizing his new command, Hoisington employed them on the Northeastern Vermont frontier so they could observe and report on the movement of British soldiers and their Native American allies who were based in Canada.

== Death and burial ==
Hoisington contracted smallpox while on duty. He died in Newbury, Vermont on February 28, 1777. He was buried at Oxbow Cemetery in Newbury.

== Family ==
In 1759, Hoisington married Mary Boardman (1739–1798). They were the parents of Isaac, Bliss, Ozias, Verlina, Cynthia, Lavinia, Mary, Barzava, and Joab. His sons Isaac, Bliss, and Verlina served in his ranger unit, and were with him when he died.
