= Newbury (town), Vermont =

Newbury, Vermont
- Town
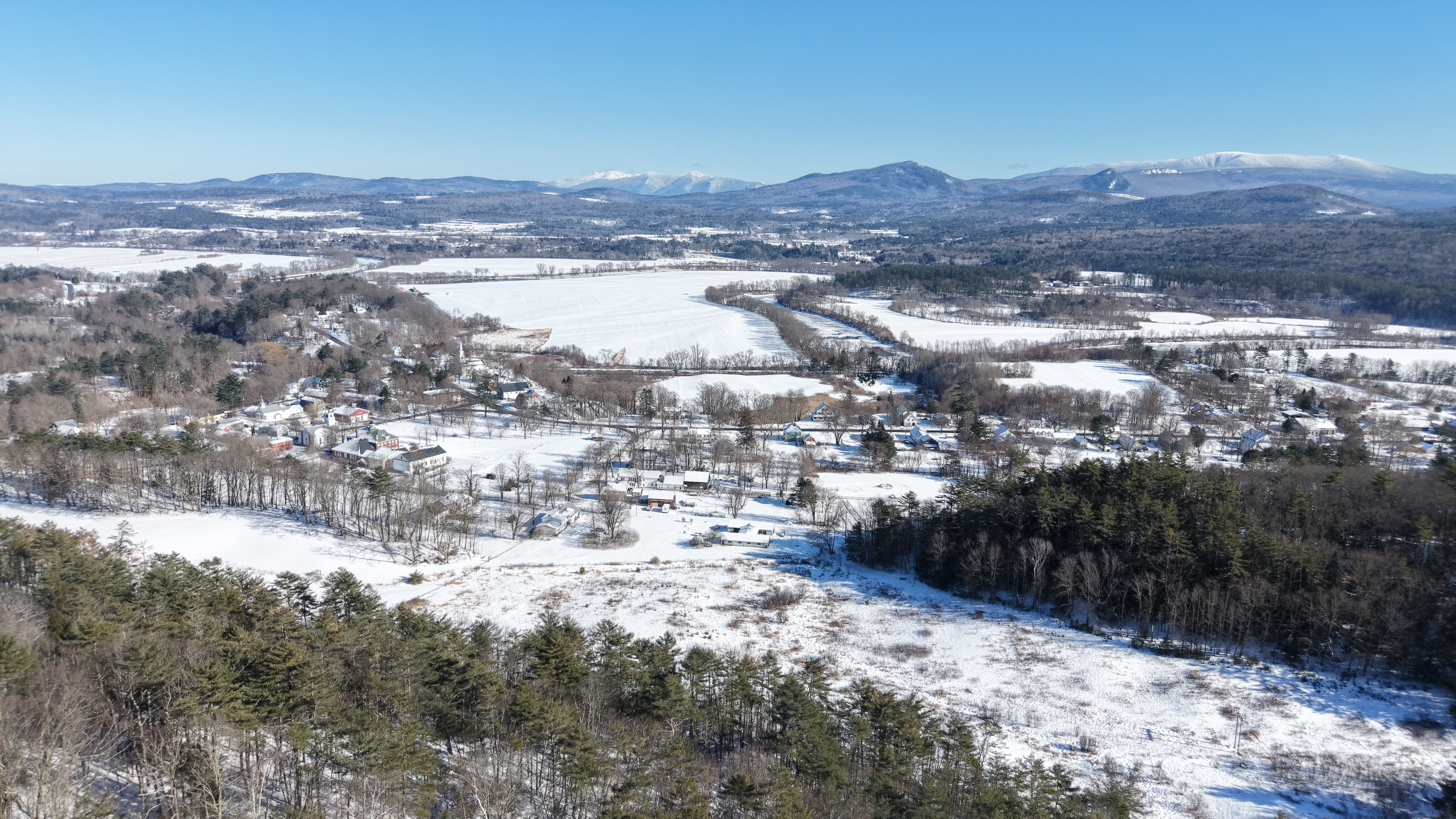
- Newbury, VT, from the west

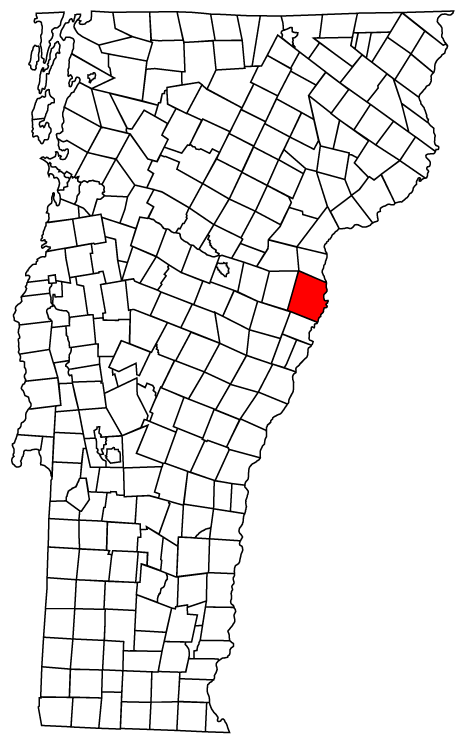
- Located in Orange County, Vermont
- Coordinates: 44°07′30″N 72°07′11″W
- Country: United States
- State: Vermont
- County: Orange
- Chartered: 1763
- Communities: Newbury; Wells River

Area
  - Total: 64.4 sq mi (166.9 km^{2})
  - Land: 64.2 sq mi (166.2 km^{2})
  - Water: 0.27 sq mi (0.7 km^{2})
- Elevation: 761 ft (232 m)

Population (2020)
  - Total: 2,293
  - Density: 35.73/sq mi (13.80/km^{2})
- Time zone: UTC-5 (EST)
  - Summer (DST): UTC-4 (EDT)
- ZIP Codes: 05051 (Newbury); 05081 (Wells River); 05069 (South Ryegate); 05040 (East Corinth); 05033 (Bradford)
- Area code: 802
- FIPS code: 50-48175
- GNIS feature ID: 1462158
- Website: www.newburyvt.org

Newbury is a town in Orange County, Vermont, United States. The population was 2,293 at the 2020 census. Newbury includes the villages of Newbury, Center Newbury, West Newbury, South Newbury, Boltonville, Peach Four Corners, and Wells River.

== History ==
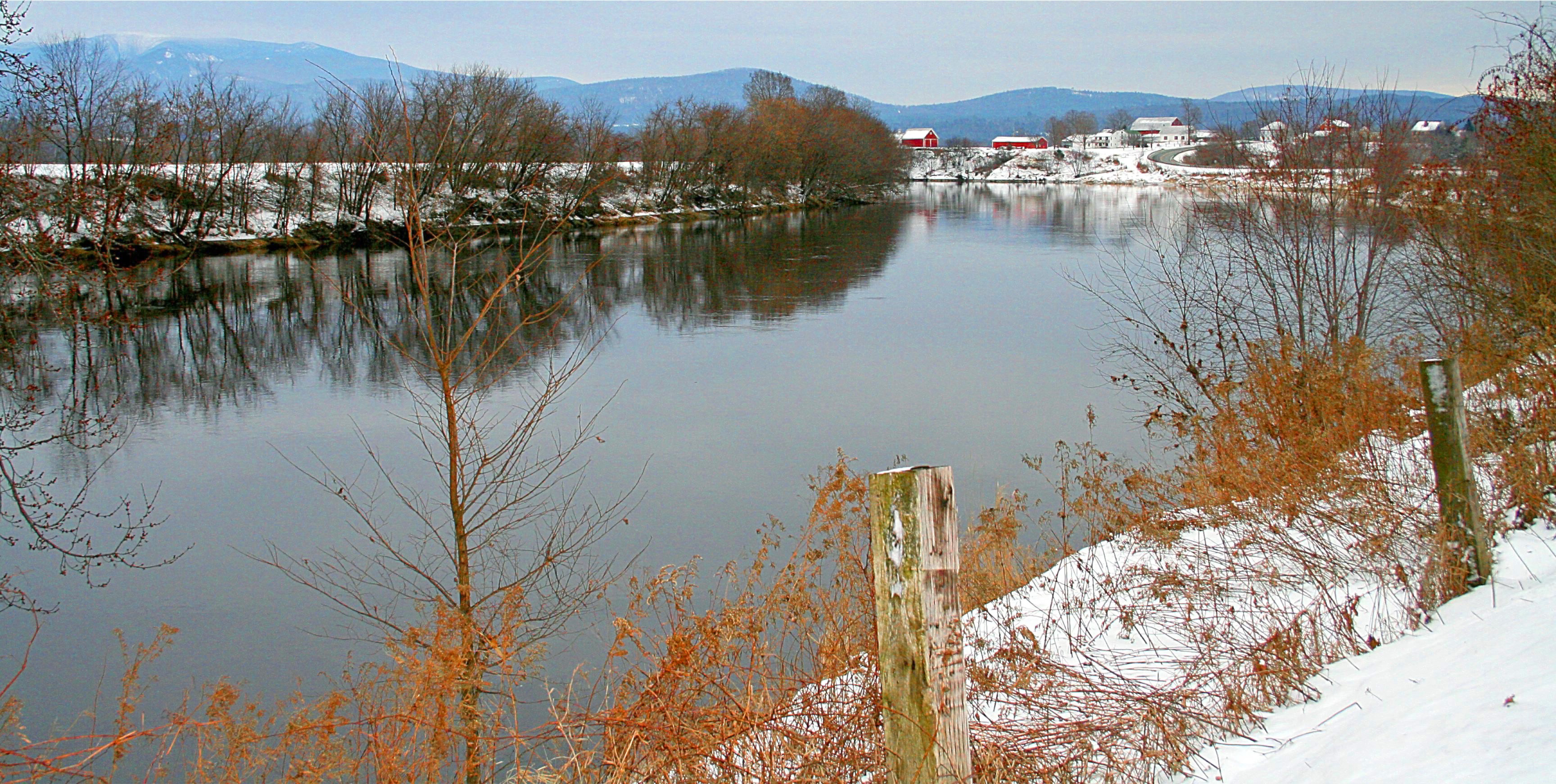
Connecticut River from Newbury

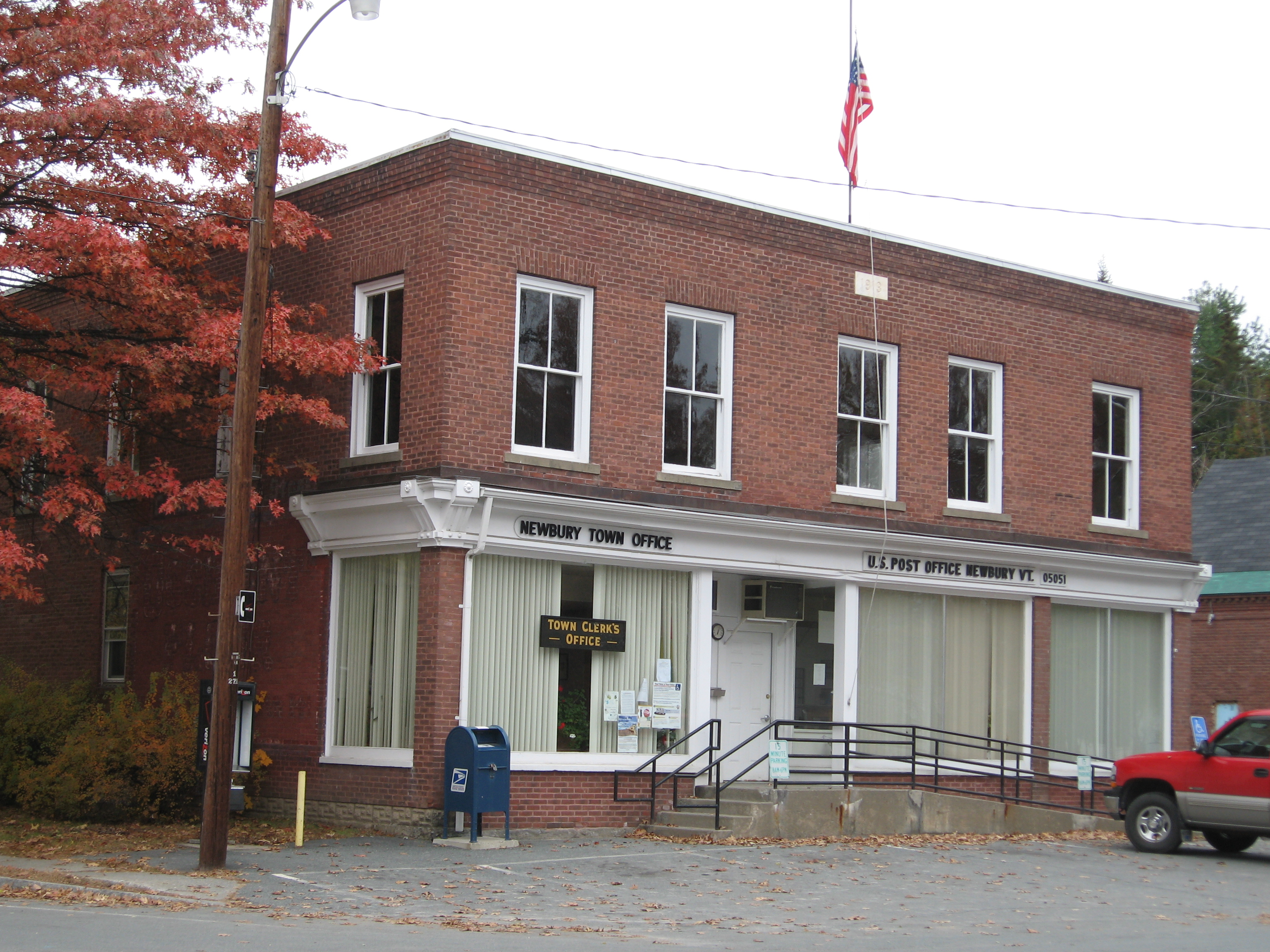
Town office and post office

Located at the Great Oxbow of the Connecticut River, with vast tracts of beautiful and fertile intervale, the area was a favorite of the Indians. Rivers teemed with salmon and brooks with trout. Prior to European settlement, the Newbury area was the location of a village called Cowass or Cowassuck of the Pennacook tribe. Cowass in Abenaki is "Coo-ash-auke," meaning "place of pine trees," and was a general name these people gave to the upper Connecticut River Valley and Lakes region. The village was known to French Jesuit missions as Koés. In 1704 the Pennacook at Cowass kept several captives from the Deerfield Raid in the village, including Stephen Williams who was kept with Sachem George Tahanto The area was first settled by English colonists in 1762 by Samuel Sleeper and family. One of the New Hampshire grants, Newbury was chartered by Governor Benning Wentworth on March 18, 1763, to Jacob Bayley and 74 others, some from Newbury, Massachusetts.

The town served as the southern terminus of the Bayley Hazen Military Road, begun by Bayley in 1760 and then continued until 1779 by Colonel Moses Hazen. Meanwhile, pioneer farmers had to carry their grain 60 miles (97 kilometers) by canoe to Charlestown, New Hampshire to get it ground into flour. By 1859, when the population was 2,984, Newbury had two gristmills, in addition to a paper mill and steam mill to manufacture mackerel kits. The principal industry, however, along the alluvial meadows was raising beef cattle and sheep, and the production of wool and dairy goods. The Connecticut & Passumpsic Rivers Railroad opened on November 6, 1848, to the village of Wells River. It developed as an adjunct of the railway town across the Connecticut River at Woodsville, the once bustling village within Haverhill, New Hampshire.

In the summer of 1913 a large fire destroyed 21 buildings in Newbury, including a church, the public school, the hotel and a number of businesses and residences. Only a change of the wind saved the balance of the town since there was no fire department at that time.

In 1958, Newbury gained widespread notoriety after an unpopular farmer disappeared. The discovery of his bound body in the river three months later led to his death being described as a "lynching" by newspapers along the East Coast. Two suspects were acquitted, and the crime was never solved.

Boston University, one of New England's largest universities, traces its roots to the establishment of the Newbury Biblical Institute, a Methodist school founded in Newbury, Vermont in 1839.

== Geography ==
The town of Newbury is located in the northeast corner of Orange County.

According to the United States Census Bureau, the town has a total area of 64.4 square miles (166.9 km^{2}), of which 64.2 square miles (166.2 km^{2}) is land and 0.3 square mile (0.7 km^{2}) (0.40%) is water. Bounded on the east by the Connecticut River, which forms the Vermont–New Hampshire border, Newbury is drained by the Wells River, Halls Brook and Peach Brook.

The town is crossed by Interstate 91, U.S. Route 5, and U.S. Route 302.

== Demographics ==
Historical population
Census	Pop.	Note	%±
1790	873		—
1800	1,304		49.4%
1810	1,363		4.5%
1820	1,623		19.1%
1830	2,252		38.8%
1840	2,579		14.5%
1850	2,984		15.7%
1860	2,549		−14.6%
1870	2,241		−12.1%
1880	2,316		3.3%
1890	2,080		−10.2%
1900	2,125		2.2%
1910	2,035		−4.2%
1920	1,908		−6.2%
1930	1,744		−8.6%
1940	1,723		−1.2%
1950	1,667		−3.3%
1960	1,452		−12.9%
1970	1,440		−0.8%
1980	1,699		18.0%
1990	1,985		16.8%
2000	1,955		−1.5%
2010	2,216		13.4%
2020	2,293		3.5%
U.S. Decennial Census

As of the census of 2000, there were 1,955 people, 816 households, and 553 families residing in the town. The population density was 30.5 people per square mile (11.8/km^{2}). There were 1,153 housing units at an average density of 18.0/sq mi (6.9/km^{2}). The racial makeup of the town was 97.44% White, 0.31% Black or African American, 0.66% Native American, 0.20% Asian, and 1.38% from two or more races. Hispanic or Latino of any race were 0.15% of the population.

There were 816 households, out of which 29.4% had children under the age of 18 living with them, 55.6% were married couples living together, 7.7% had a female householder with no husband present, and 32.2% were non-families. 26.3% of all households were made up of individuals, and 11.8% had someone living alone who was 65 years of age or older. The average household size was 2.40 and the average family size was 2.88.

In the town, the population was spread out, with 24.2% under the age of 18, 5.5% from 18 to 24, 25.7% from 25 to 44, 27.3% from 45 to 64, and 17.2% who were 65 years of age or older. The median age was 42 years. For every 100 females, there were 94.3 males. For every 100 females age 18 and over, there were 90.9 males.

The median income for a household in the town was $32,721, and the median income for a family was $42,262. Males had a median income of $30,169 versus $21,780 for females. The per capita income for the town was $17,659. About 8.6% of families and 12.9% of the population were below the poverty line, including 16.3% of those under age 18 and 10.6% of those age 65 or over.

== Sites of interest ==
- Bayley Historic District
- Bedell Covered Bridge site
- Camp Farwell, founded in 1889, and reported to be the longest running girls summer camp in the United States.
- Newbury Historical Society & Museum
- Newbury Town House (1839)
- Oxbow Historic District
- Newbury Village Store, c. 1840

== Notable people ==
- Horace W. Bailey, US Marshal for Vermont
- Jacob Bayley, general during the American Revolution
- Frank M. Bryan, political scientist
- Molly Gray, politician
- Ernest N. Harmon, major general
- Diana Mara Henry, photographer
- Joab Hoisington, militia leader in the American Revolution
- Jeremiah Ingalls, early American folk composer
- Jacob Kent Jr., U.S. Marshal for Vermont
- Henry Keyes, politician and railroad president
- Henry W. Keyes, US senator and 56th governor of New Hampshire
- Sydney Lea, Poet Laureate from Vermont
- Charles D. Nelson, Michigan politician
- William T. Porter, journalist
- Abel Underwood, U.S. Attorney for Vermont
- George W. Webber, US congressman
