= Town meeting =

Form of direct democracy for cities or towns

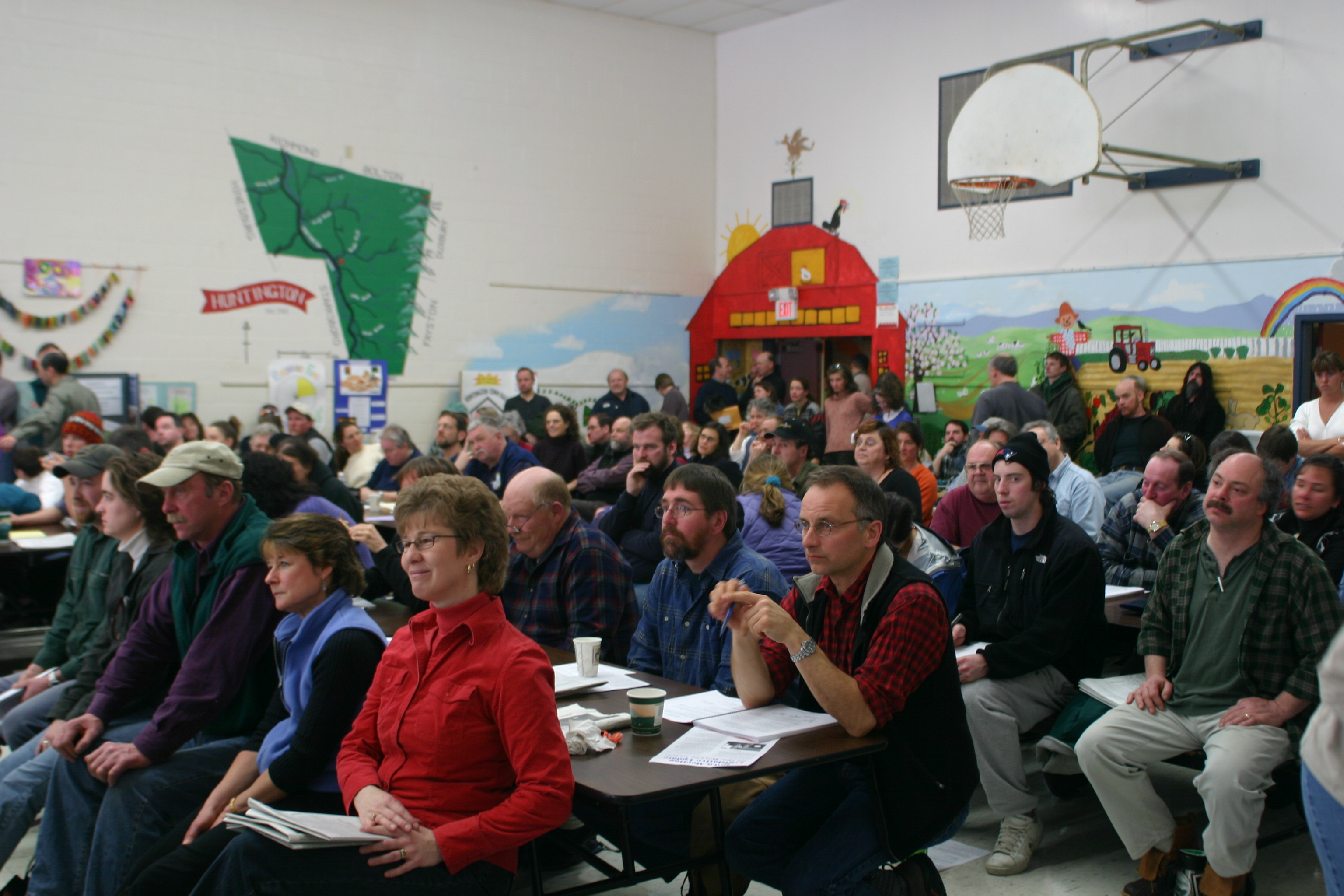
A town meeting in Huntington, Vermont

Town meeting, also known as an open town meeting, is a form of local government in the United States in which eligible town residents can directly participate in an assembly which determines the governance of their town. Unlike representative town meeting where only elected representatives can participate in the governing assembly, any town voter may participate in an open town meeting. This form is distinct from the town hall meetings that are held by elected officials to communicate with their constituents and have no decision-making power.

At a town meeting, attendees determine the ordinances or rules of the town, its boards and commissions, elected and appointed positions, capital investments, expenditures, budgets, and local taxation, as well as the manner and frequency of future town meetings. Because towns self-govern and maintain their autonomy, town meetings vary from state to state, as well as from town to town.

Since town residents directly participate in their own governance and represent themselves without any intermediary, town meeting is an example of direct democracy, and examined as a case study in democratic theory.

== History ==
Town meetings have been practiced in the U.S. region of New England since colonial times and in some western states since at least the late 19th century. Town meeting can also refer to meetings of other governmental bodies such as regional water or school districts. While the uses and laws vary by town and state, the general form is for residents of the town to periodically gather and serve as the legislative body, voting on finances, ordinances, and other matters of governance.

Records of early New England governance are sparse, leading to debate about the origin of town meeting. One interpretation is that it was adapted from local vestry meetings held in 17th century England that were responsible for financial decisions of the parish church. Another is that it stemmed from New England colonists aboard the Mayflower who, upon landing in Plymouth, Massachusetts, gathered to adopt their own rules of governance, the Mayflower Compact. In colonial New England there was very little separation between church and town governance, but town meeting continued to play a secular role after the disestablishment of the state churches, forming the core of government for most New England towns today.

== Democratic theory ==
Since the turn of the nineteenth century, political scientists have characterized New England's town meetings as notable examples of direct democracy. In 1831, political philosopher Alexis de Tocqueville visited several townships in Massachusetts, remarking in the first volume of Democracy in America (1835) that town governments in New England appeared to show greater political independence than French communes or other municipal bodies in Europe. Tocqueville believed that town meetings, with direct power given to attending residents, trained citizens for participation in broader democratic society. Town meetings also influenced American republican thought particularly for Thomas Jefferson, who believed they were "the perfect exercise of self-government and for its preservation".

Town meetings represent some of the only modern institutions, apart from some townships in Minnesota and the cantons of Switzerland, in which everyday citizens can regularly participate in "face-to-face" assemblies that deliberate binding collective action decisions in the form of laws. Proponents of communitarianism and civic republicanism in political thought, notably Frank M. Bryan of the University of Vermont, have advocated town meetings as forms of direct democracy based upon unitary values.

Deliberative democrats, such as James Fishkin, have presented the town meeting as a setting of "empowered participation" in which thoughtful deliberation between all participating individuals can coexist with a sense of engaged citizenship and responsibility for solving local problems. Both camps, however, note the difficulties of maintaining the benefits of town meetings when the format is scaled to larger groups.

=== Criticism ===
Other political scientists have expressed more skepticism toward town meetings on the basis of their poor attendance and lack of representativeness. Jane Mansbridge and Donald L. Robinson have argued that town meetings in Vermont and Massachusetts feature extremely low turnout in part because they last for a full working day, leading to disproportionate representation of retirees and non-working residents in the meetings. As participation is still voluntary for attendees of the meeting, Mansbridge also notes differences in participation on the basis of education and class when conflicts arise, writing that "the face-to-face assembly lets those who have no trouble speaking defend their interests; it does not give the average citizen comparable protection." Feminist critics have also identified mixed results in town meetings. While women's rates of attendance at town meetings was nearly equal relative to men's, their participation in discussion relative to men declined as the size of the town increased.

== By state ==
Town meeting is used in portions of the United States, principally in New England, where it has been the primary form of town government since the 17th century.

=== Connecticut ===
Connecticut town meetings are usually bound to a published agenda; meeting participants can not alter proposed items or add new business. Each town determines the method, frequency, and range of governance for its town meeting and codifies these in its ordinances or town charter.

A moderator is chosen at the start of each meeting, which is typically held in a public venue, either in the town itself or nearby. Votes are taken by voice, and if close by show of hands.

In towns with an open town meeting form, all registered voters of the town are eligible to participate in and vote at town meetings. Representative town meeting is used by some larger towns, where voters elect representatives to participate in town meetings, similar to a town council. Some towns use a financial town meeting form where an open town meeting exists with limited jurisdiction to vote solely on financial affairs while the town's legislative powers have been vested in a town council.

Town meetings may have binding votes for some items in which the meeting participants vote to approve or deny the measure. Some towns require a referendum for items such as annual budgets and changes to the town's ordinances. For those items, the town meeting votes to whether or not to send the issue to a referendum, which is held at a later date pursuant to the schedule laid out in that town's ordinances.

=== Maine ===
In Maine, the town meeting system originated during the period when the District of Maine was part of Massachusetts. Most cities and towns operate under the town meeting form of government or a modified version of it. Maine annual town meetings traditionally are held in March. Special town meetings also may be called from time to time.

The executive agency of town government is an elected, part-time board, known as the Board of Selectmen, having three, five, or seven members. Between sessions, the board of selectmen interprets the policy set at Town Meeting and is assigned numerous duties including: approving all town non-school expenditures, authorizing highway construction and repair, serving as town purchasing agent for non-school items, issuing licenses, and overseeing the conduct of all town activities. Often the part-time selectmen also serve as town assessors, overseers of the poor, and road commissioners. Generally, there are other elected town officers whose duties are specified by law. These may include clerks, assessors, tax collectors, treasurers, school committee members, constables, and others.

In 1927 the town of Camden adopted a special charter and became the first Maine town to apply the manager concept to the town meeting-selectmen framework. Under this system, the manager is administrative head of town government, responsible to the select board for the administration of all departments under its control. The manager's duties include acting as purchasing agent, seeing that laws and ordinances are enforced, making appointments and removals, and fixing the compensation of appointees. (See also: Council–manager government.)

From 1927 to 1939, eleven other Maine towns adopted special act charters similar to the Camden charter. Today, 135 Maine towns have the town meeting-selectmen-manager system, while 209 use the town meeting-selectmen system.

=== Massachusetts ===
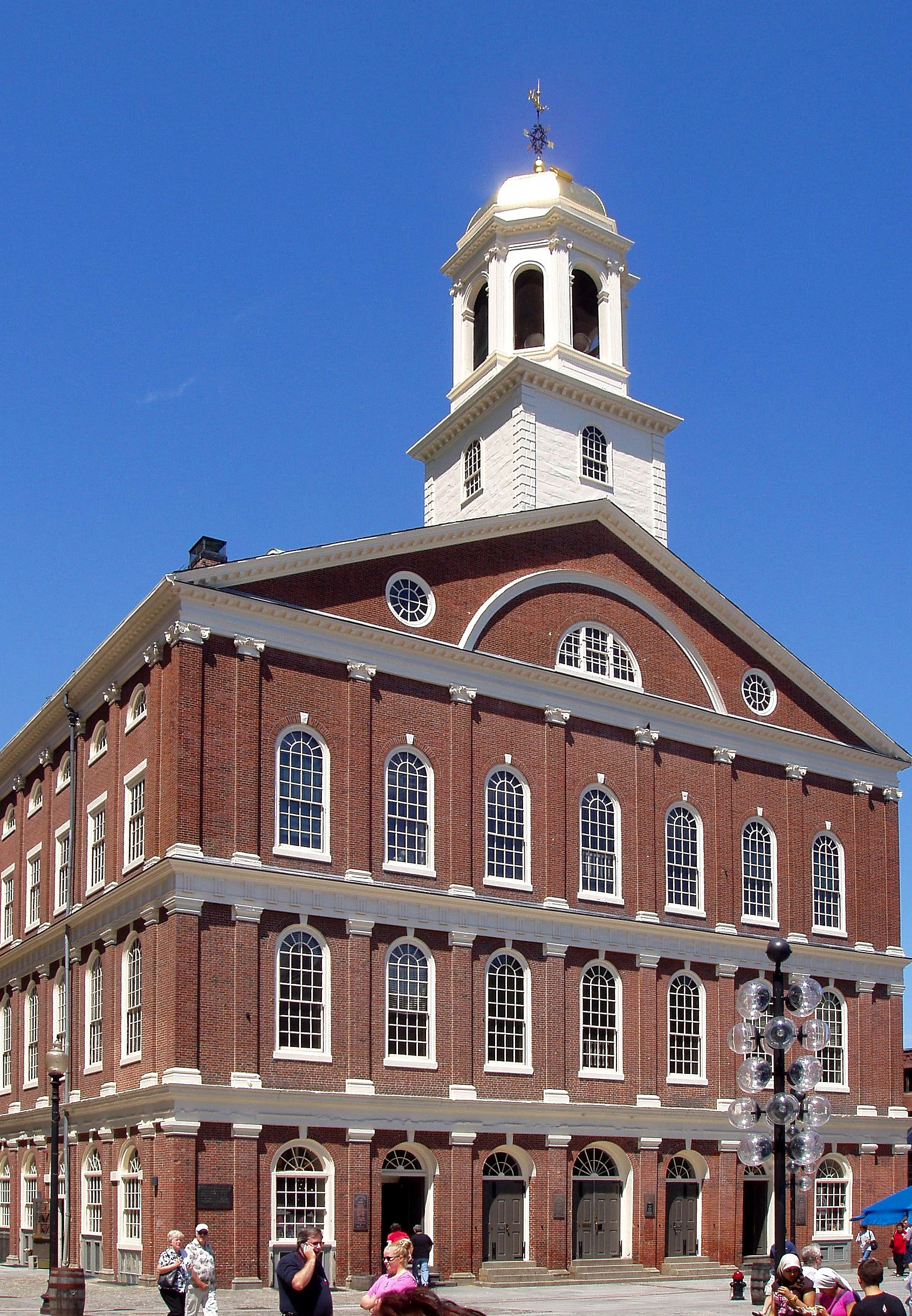
Faneuil Hall in Boston

==== History ====
The town meeting "was the original and protean vessel of local authority." The early meetings were informal, with all men in town likely participating. Even when it did not fully exercise it, "the power of the town meeting knew no limit." Town meeting

created principles to regulate taxation and land distribution; it bought land for town use and forbade the use of it forever to those who could not pay their share within a month; it decided the number of pines each family could cut from the swamp and which families could cover their house with clapboard. The men who went to that town meeting hammered out the abstract principles under which they would live and regulated the most minute details of their lives. The decisions they made then affected the lives of their children and grandchildren.

Town meeting often had a reputation for being "active, suspicious, contradictory, and cantankerous", but it was well regarded by others. (Note: See, for example, Henry David Thoreau's comments: "I am more and more convinced that, with reference to any public question, it is more important to know what the country thinks of it than what the city thinks. The city does not think much. On any moral question, I would rather have the opinion of Boxboro than of Boston and New York put together. When the former speaks, I feel as if somebody had spoken, as if humanity was yet, and a reasonable being had asserted its rights — as if some unprejudiced men among the country's hills had at length turned their attention to the subject, and by a few sensible words redeemed the reputation of the race. When, in some obscure country town, the farmers come together to a special town-meeting, to express their opinion on some subject which is vexing the land, that, I think, is the true Congress, and the most respectable one that is ever assembled in the United States.")

In 1692, the Great and General Court declared that final authority on bylaws rested with town meetings and not selectmen. Two years later, in 1694, the General Court took authority to appoint assessors from selectmen and gave it to town meetings. An act of the colonial legislature gave town meeting the right to elect its own moderators in 1715, but this had already been in practice for several years in towns such as Dedham.

A colony law required all voters to be church members until 1647, though it may not have been enforced. The law changed in 1647, requiring voters to be above 24 years of age. The colony added a new requirement that a man must own taxable property with a value of at least 20 pounds in 1658 and increased that sum to 80 pounds in 1670. The 1670 law had a grandfather clause allowing all those who previously were qualified to keep the franchise. In 1691, the property requirement was lowered back to 20 pounds.

In provincial elections, only church members could vote. The number continued to fall from there. While in many respects Massachusetts society resembled England, the franchise was more widespread in the colony than it was in the mother country, as were the powers of local elected officials.

==== Forms ====
In Massachusetts, towns with fewer than 6,000 residents must adopt the open town meeting form of government. Massachusetts towns with 6,000 or more residents may adopt either open town meeting or the representative town meeting form of government.

The select board summons the town meeting into existence by issuing the warrant, which is the list of items—known as articles—to be voted on, with descriptions of each article.

The Moderator presides over the meeting, making sure that the town's chosen rules of parliamentary procedure are followed, judging the results of voice votes or shows of hands and counting votes that are too close to be judged by eye or ear. The Finance Committee, often called the Advisory Committee, makes recommendations on articles dealing with money and often drafts the proposed budget. The Town Clerk serves as the clerk of the meeting by recording its results. Town Counsel may make legal recommendations on any articles of the warrant, to ensure town meeting is acting lawfully.

Massachusetts towns having at least 6,000 residents may adopt a representative town meeting system through the normal charter change process in the State Legislature. Representative Town Meetings function largely the same as an Open Town Meeting except that not all registered voters can vote. The townspeople instead elect Town Meeting Members by precinct to represent them and to vote on the issues for them. Before it became a city in 2018, Framingham, which at the time was the largest town in the Commonwealth by population, had 216 representatives in Town Meeting, twelve from each precinct.

==== Scheduling ====
An annual town meeting is held in the spring and may also be known as the annual budget meeting. Towns were once required to hold their annual town meetings between February 1 and May 31, but Chapter 85 of the Acts of 2008 extended this window of time to June 30. (Town fiscal years start on July 1.) At this meeting, the town budgets for the new fiscal year and takes care of any outstanding housekeeping items from the current fiscal year. It may also vote on non-budgetary warrant articles, including the town's general and zoning bylaws.

An article may be placed on the warrant by the Selectmen, sometimes at the request of town departments, or by a petition signed by at least ten registered voters of the town.

Special town meetings' may be held whenever necessary, usually to deal with financial or other pertinent issues that develop between annual town meetings. They function the same as an annual town meeting, only the number of signatures required on a petition rises to 100. While the Selectmen generally call such a meeting, voters may call one through petition, and the number of signatures required on a petition to call a special town meeting is 200 or 20% of the registered voters, whichever number is lower. The selectmen have 45 days from the date of receiving such a petition to hold a special town meeting.

=== New Hampshire ===
In New Hampshire, towns, village districts (which can deal with various government activities but usually concern public water supplies) and school districts have the option of choosing one of two types of annual meeting: Traditional meetings, and ballot-vote meetings that are known informally as "SB 2" or "Senate Bill 2". A variation of SB 2 and representative town meeting are also allowed under state law but as of 2015 are not in use by any community.

==== Traditional town meetings ====
Traditional town meeting is held annually on the second Tuesday of March to choose town officers, approve a town budget, and approve large contracts. Town selectmen can call special town meetings throughout the year as needed, although these must be approved by a judge if they affect the budget. State law prohibits town meetings from being held on the biennial election day in November.

State law lets the town moderator adjourn a long-running meeting and reconvene it at a later date to finish the town's business.

Any town meeting or adjournment thereof must have its time and place published with three days' notice, along with the warrant specifying each issue to be decided. Town meeting can amend the warrant articles before voting on them, and can conduct non-binding discussions of other issues, but cannot make other binding votes without this notice to town voters.

Attendance wanes over the course of a town meeting, and a traditional tactic was to re-vote after many on the opposite side had gone home. In 1991, the state enacted RSA 40:10, giving town meeting members the right to bar reconsideration of a specified vote (or any "action...which involves the same subject matter"). If a town meeting does not bar reconsideration and later does vote to reconsider a decision, the issue can be taken up only at an adjourned session at least one week later.

==== Official ballot referendums (SB 2) ====
Official ballot referendums, or the SB 2 format, provides that town voters make binding decisions not at town meeting but by secret ballot in the municipal election. To adopt SB 2, or to revert to traditional town meetings, a question to that effect on the municipal ballot must win a three-fifths majority. This format was instituted by the state legislature in 1995 because of concerns that modern lifestyles had made it difficult for people to attend traditional town meetings. In 2019, however, the law was changed so that the three-fifths majority would have to occur at town meeting itself: The town meeting would have to vote to remove its own final decisions to the municipal ballot.

Under SB 2, a first session, called a "Deliberative Session", is held about a month prior to the town election. This session is similar in many ways to the traditional town meeting. However, unlike the town meeting, while the wording and dollar amounts of proposed ballot measures may be amended, no actual voting on the merits of the proposals takes place.

Deliberative sessions are less well attended, in bodies that have adopted SB 2, than are plenary town meetings in bodies that have not adopted SB 2, as their decisions are not final. However, the final vote by secret ballot attracts more voters than town meetings do because of the shorter time requirement, and absentees can vote.

Deliberative sessions have been charged with "sabotaging" the intent of a ballot question; for example, changing a warrant article, "To see if the Town will raise and appropriate (amount) for (purpose)" to merely read, "To see." A 2011 law barred deliberative sessions from deleting the subject matter of a warrant article. In 2016, petitioners in Exeter submitted an article to place on the ballot an advisory "vote of no confidence" in a school official, and the deliberative session removed the word "no".

The second session, held on a set election day, is when issues such as the town's budget and other measures, known as warrant articles, are voted upon. When adopting SB 2, towns or school districts may hold elections on the second Tuesday in March, the second Tuesday in April, or the second Tuesday in May. The election dates may be changed by majority vote. If a vote is taken to approve the change of the local elections, the date becomes effective the following year.

In 2002, according to the University of New Hampshire Center for Public Policy studies, 171 towns in New Hampshire had traditional town meeting, while 48 had SB 2. Another 15 municipalities, most of them incorporated cities, had no annual meeting. The study found that 102 school districts had traditional town meeting, 64 had SB 2 meeting and 10 had no annual meeting.

Because traditional-meeting communities tend to be smaller, only one third of the state's population was governed by traditional town meetings in 2002 and only 22 percent by traditional school-district meetings.

==== Official ballot town council ====
The Official Ballot Town Council is a variant form of the Town Council, in which certain items are to be placed on the ballot to be voted on by the registered voters. This process mimics the SB 2 process, except that the Town Council makes the determination of what items will go on the ballot.

==== Budgetary town meeting ====
The Budgetary Town Meeting is a variation of the Open Meeting, but only the annual town operating budget as presented by the governing body can be voted on by the registered voters. When a town charter provides for a Budgetary Town Meeting it also must establish the procedures for the transfer of funds among various departments, funds, accounts and agencies as may be necessary during the year.

==== Representative town meeting ====
State law (RSA 49-D:3 (paragraph III)) gives the alternative of a representative town meeting, similar to that of a town council, in which voters elect a small number of residents to act as the legislative body in their stead. Representative town meeting follows the same procedure as traditional town meetings, except they cannot decide matters that state law requires to be placed on the official town ballot. Representative town meeting is selected by a town charter, which may require additional matters to go onto the town ballot.

As of 2006, this form of government is not used in any town or school district in New Hampshire.

==== Moderator ====
Moderators are elected to two-year terms on even years in towns and are elected in city wards at every other city election. The moderator presides over town meetings, regulates their business, prescribes rules of procedure, decides questions of order, and declares the outcome of each vote. Town meeting voters can override the moderator's procedural rulings.

The moderator also has the authority to postpone and reschedule the town meeting (or deliberative session, if SB 2 is in effect) to another reasonable date, place, and time certain in the case of a weather emergency in which the moderator reasonably believes the roads to be hazardous or unsafe.

The 2017 municipal election was preceded by a large snowstorm, and the Secretary of State clarified that this statutory authority does not extend to postponing elections, but moderators in several towns did so anyway. The law was changed in 2019 to authorize the town moderator to postpone an election to a date certain based on a National Weather Service "event" or "accident, natural disaster, or other emergency", after consultations with other officials and the Secretary of State. In the case of a storm, the right to vote absentee was extended to any voter with safety concerns.

=== New York ===
Town meetings were the rule in New York from the colonial period into the 20th century. They were typically held between February 1 and May 1 of each year primarily for the election of town officials but were also empowered to set "rules for fences and for impounding animals", supporting the poor, raising taxes, and to "determine any other question lawfully submitted to them". In the late 1890s the state legislature shifted the meetings – by this time no more than town elections – to biennial to conform to the pattern of federal, state, and municipal elections in the state's cities. It also permitted, and later directed, town meetings to be held in November. That process was not complete until the 1920s. Laws adopted in 1932 for the first time refer to "Biennial town elections", stating that these were "a substitute for a town meeting...and a reference in any law to a town meeting or special town meeting shall be construed as reference to a town election". The state's school districts (independent units with taxing powers) voted on budgets and capital levies and elected school board members in town-meeting style until the late 1950s.

=== Rhode Island ===
Due to a change in the state's constitution, Rhode Island municipalities have a greater degree of home rule compared to the other New England states. Like Connecticut, a few towns utilize a so-called Financial Town Meeting in which an Open Town Meeting exists with limited jurisdiction to vote only on financial affairs and the town's legislative powers have been vested in a Town Council. The direct democracy tradition is now uncommon in Rhode Island. Ten towns have town meeting governments: Barrington, Exeter, Foster, Glocester, Hopkinton, Little Compton, Richmond, Scituate, Tiverton, and West Greenwich.

=== Vermont ===
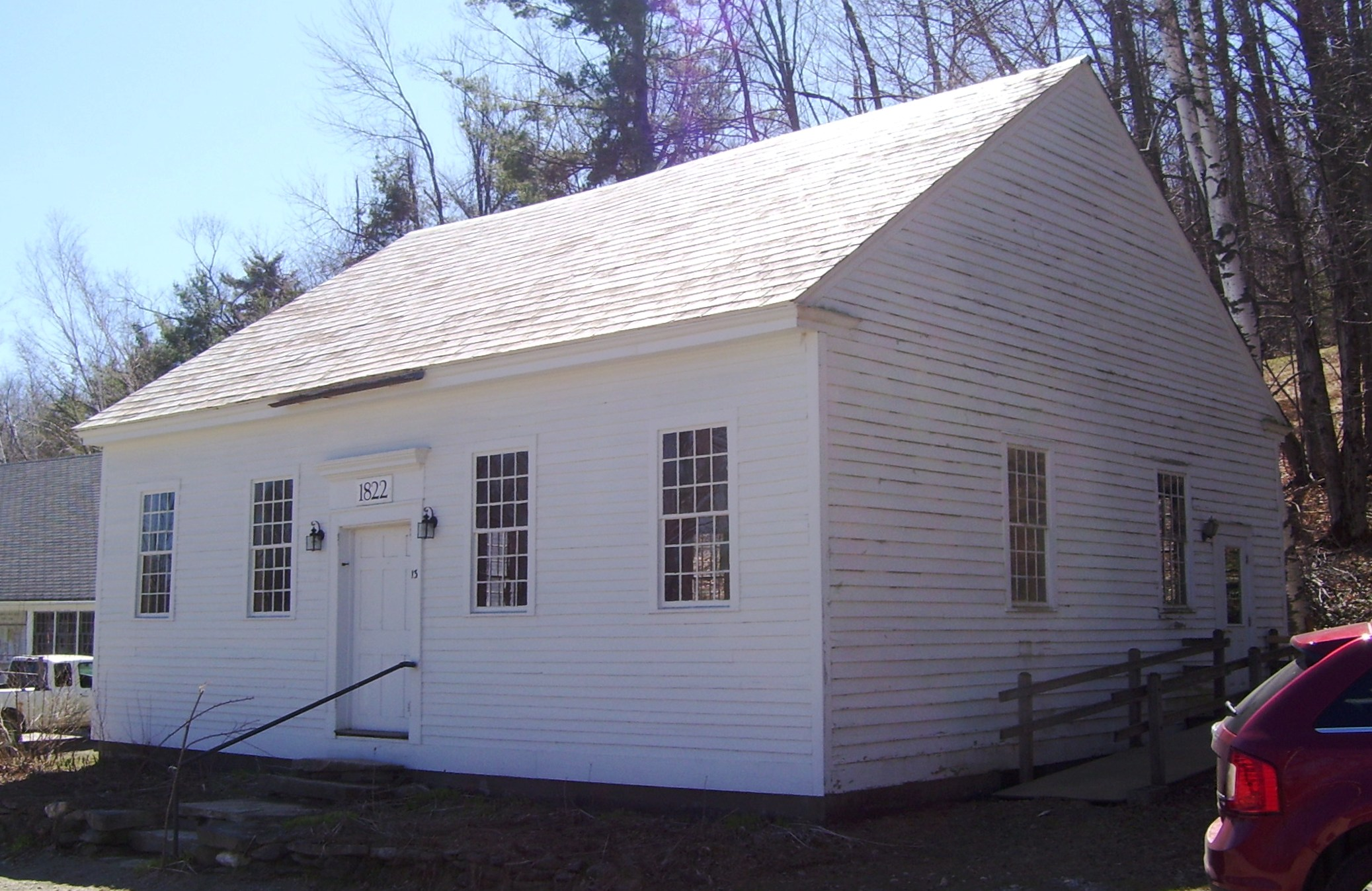
The Town House of Marlboro, Vermont, was built in 1822 to be used for town meetings, which had previously been held in private homes. It is still in use today.

Vermont towns are normally required to hold an annual town meeting on the first Tuesday in March at a place designated by the select board. The date of the annual Town meeting may be changed by a vote of the citizens at a Town meeting duly warned for that purpose. The purpose of town meeting is to elect municipal officers, approve annual budgets and conduct any other business. All cities and some towns in Vermont operate under charters instead of general legislation (see special legislation). The cities and chartered towns, except for South Burlington, are required by the terms of their charters to hold an annual town meeting, on Town Meeting Day. Many towns vote on matters of substance (e.g., budgets, elected officials, etc.) by secret ballot (also known as Australian ballot). However, there is no state law that requires towns to vote by Australian ballot; several towns still conduct all business "from the floor".

Cities and towns are governed by either a city council or a select board. They are fully empowered to act on most issues and are generally referred to as the municipality's legislative body. But all town budgets (and those of other independent taxing authorities) must be approved by plebiscite; explaining the local government's budget request to the voters is the principal business of Town Meeting. Voters at Town Meeting may also vote on non-binding resolutions, and may place items on the ballot for the following year's meeting.

There is no general requirement for chartered municipalities to observe town meeting or to put their budgets to plebiscite. When the Town of South Burlington was re-chartered as the City of South Burlington in 1971, the new charter provided for city elections in April and required only budget increases of 10% or more per annum to be placed before voters. No other municipality has been granted such a charter by the legislature, and there is strong sentiment against making future exceptions.

According to the Vermont Secretary of State's Citizen's Guide to Town Meeting, Vermont gives state employees the day off on town meeting day. Vermont "law also gives a private employee the right to take unpaid leave from work to attend his or her annual town meeting, subject to the essential operation of the business or government. Employees must provide at least seven days notice to their employer to take advantage of this right to attend town meeting. Students who are over 18 also have the right to attend town meeting" and not be declared truant.

==== Moderator ====
Moderators are elected to one-year terms. The moderator's duties include reviewing the warrant (published agenda) for town meeting, presiding over town meeting, deciding questions of order, making public declarations of each vote passed, and prescribing rules of the proceeding.

=== Other states ===
Towns in several western states and counties also practice town meeting, though generally with more limited powers.

Michigan was the first western state to adopt the town meeting system, but it was initially very restricted in its function.

Minnesota has had town meetings as the policy-setting bodies of townships. They were required once the voting population of a township reached 25 persons. Townships still hold town meetings.

New Jersey had town meetings for townships organized under the Township Act of 1798. They were abolished when the act was revised in 1899.

== Works cited ==
- Mansbridge, Jane J. (1980). Beyond Adversary Democracy. New York: Basic Books. ISBN 9780465006571.
- Lockridge, Kenneth (1985). A New England Town. New York: W.W. Norton & Company. ISBN 978-0-393-95459-3.
