= Charles Bryan =

Charles Bryan is the name of:

- Charles W. Bryan (1867–1945), Nebraska politician
- Charles F. Bryan (1911–1955), American composer, musician, music educator and collector of folk music
- Charles Henry Bryan (1822–1877), California politician
- Charles Page Bryan (1856–1918), American diplomat
- Charles S. Bryan (born 1942), American medical researcher and physician
- Charlie Bryan (1933–2013), head of the International Association of Machinists union

== See also ==
- Charles O'Brien (disambiguation)
- Charles Bryant (disambiguation)
- Bryan (surname)
