= Camp Farwell =

Summer camp in Newbury, Vermont, US

- Interactive map of Camp Farwell
- Location: Newbury, Vermont, U.S.
- Coordinates: 44.08557°N 72.121274°W
- Opened: 1889
- Slogan: Camp Farwell is the first girls summer camp in Vermont, the first girls summer camp in New England and the first girls summer camp in the United States!
- Operating season: June – August
- Website: http://www.farwell.com

Camp Farwell is a 100 acres (40 ha) summer camp for girls in Newbury, Vermont, on Halls Lake. Founded in 1889 by Julia Farwell, it may be the longest running all-girls camp in the United States.
