= Lake Charles College =

Former college in Louisiana

Coordinates: 30°13′16″N 93°12′10″W

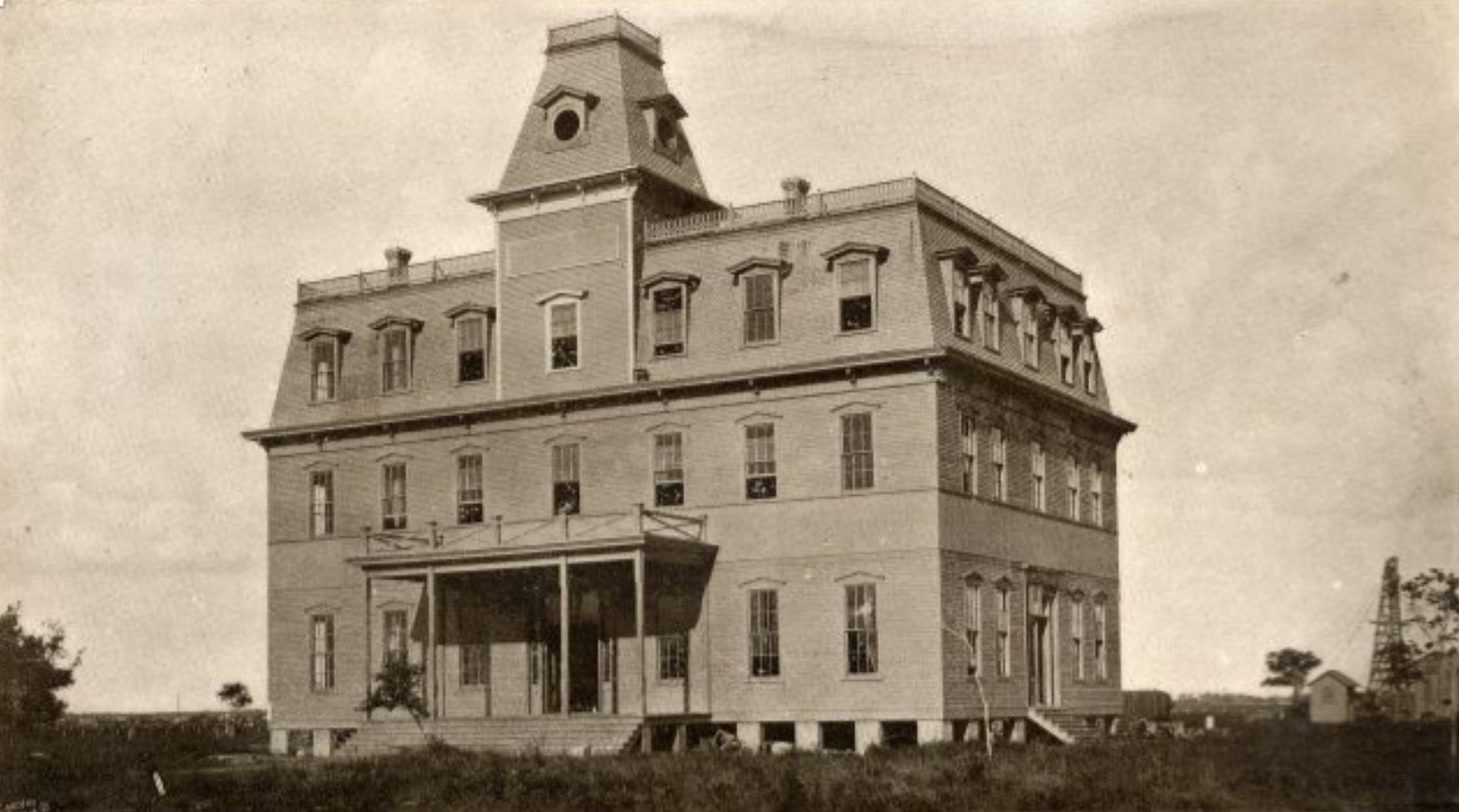
- The Lake Charles College campus in 1905, soon after its final closure.
- Type: Private
- Active: 1890–1899
- Founder: C. I. Scofield
- Affiliations: American Home Missionary Society
- Religious affiliation: Congregationalist
- Students: fewer than 200
- Location: Lake Charles, Louisiana, United States

Lake Charles College was a college and preparatory school located in Lake Charles, Louisiana. Founded by Congregationalists in 1887 and opened in 1890, it lasted only nine years before closing in 1899. A second Lake Charles College was opened in the same building in 1900, lasting only until 1902.

== Founding ==
The completion of the Louisiana Western Railroad in 1880 – connecting it to New Orleans and Houston — had turned Lake Charles from a small village to a growing town. Its population grew from 838 in 1880 to 3,442 in 1890 and 6,680 in 1900. The growth of a timber industry led to new rail lines and made Lake Charles the commercial center of southwest Louisiana. It had also attracted a large number of Northern settlers, particularly from midwestern states like Kansas, Iowa, and Minnesota, who brought their Protestant faiths into more Catholic south Louisiana.

Lake Charles College was one of a number of colleges founded by Congregational churches in the late 1800s, including Pomona College in California, Rollins College in Florida, Yankton College in South Dakota, Carleton College in Minnesota, and Colorado College.

On June 21, 1887, a meeting of Lake Charles residents heard from Cyrus Ingerson Scofield of Dallas, who served as superintendent of the American Home Missionary Society for Texas and Louisiana. The meeting created a nine-member board that included both Scofield and Seaman A. Knapp adopted articles of incorporation for Lake Charles College: "The objects of said corporation is to erect, maintain and conduct a College, for the Christian education of youth, including all customary departments, as well as the boardling and lodging of pupils, and the conferring of all literary honors and degrees, known and usually granted by any College."

While many of the new Congregational colleges being founded in the period were in relatively new areas of white settlement, Scofield wrote "that Southwestern Louisiana is, in respect of settlement, as new a country as North Dakota or Washington. Before the war, and, indeed, until eight years ago, these fertile prairies were wholly unoccupied. A few Acadians had settled along the bayous — that was all. Now farms are opened, the prairies are already dotted with homes, and thriving villages bead the long line of the railroad. Of all this region Lake Charles is the capital and emporium." For the campus, 16 acres of land a mile southeast of the Calcasieu Parish courthouse were provided by the North American Land & Timber Co., which owned large tracts across southwest Louisiana.

In 1889, Henry Lynes Hubbell (1830–1908) was selected as Lake Charles College's first president. A native of Wilton, Connecticut, Hubbell attended Yale College, Union Theological Seminary, and Andover Theological Seminary. After being ordained, he preached at churches in Connecticut, Massachusetts, Michigan, Kansas, Colorado, and New York. In 1886, he moved to Austin, Texas to lead the Tillotson Collegiate and Normal Institute, a Congregational college for African Americans which, through merger, later became Huston–Tillotson University.

== Years of operation ==
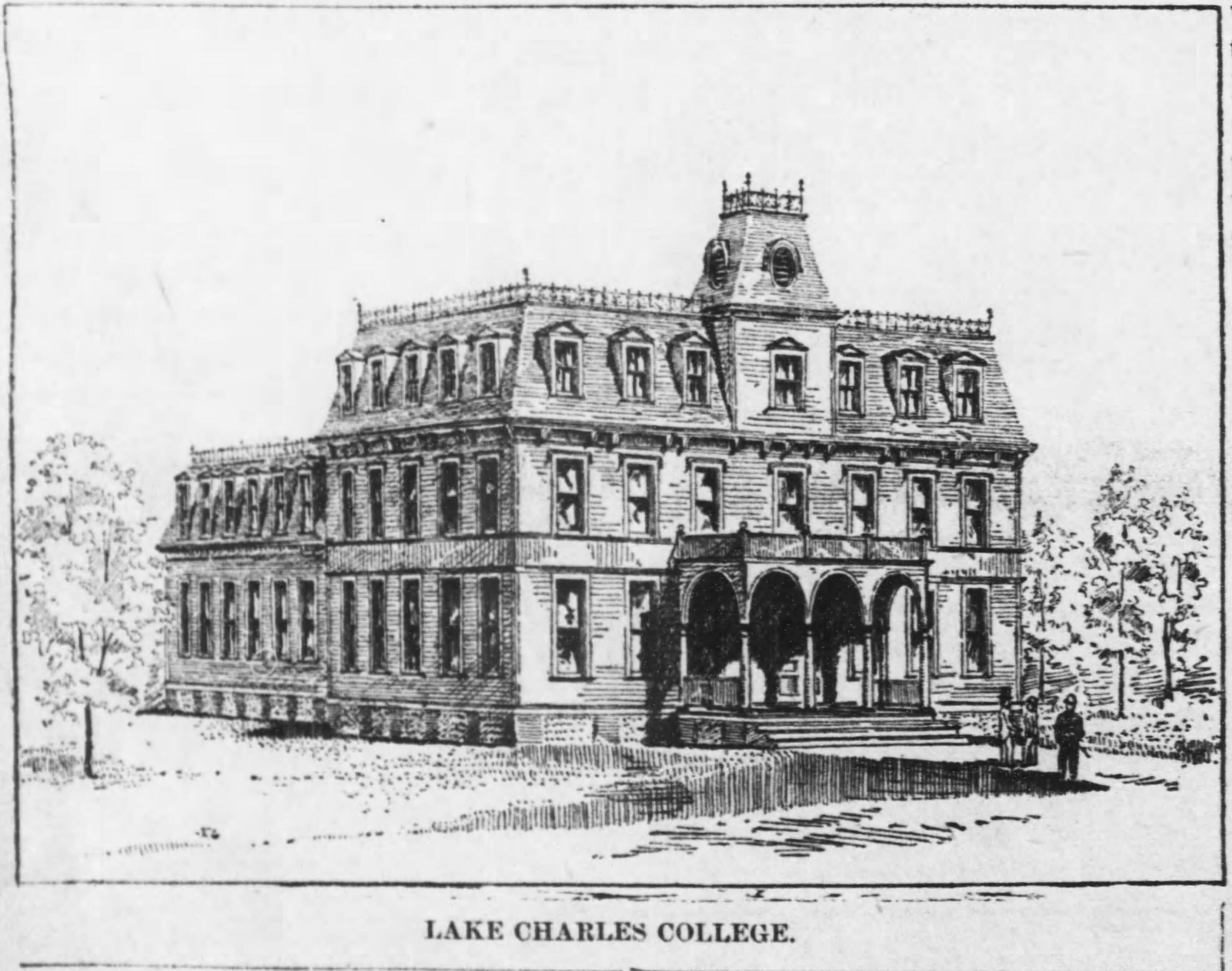
Lake Charles College, in a 1895 newspaper sketch.

On October 2, 1890, Lake Charles College opened its first term, its main building completed at a cost of nearly $20,000. It was a three-story, 14-room building sized 55 by 85 feet. It offered both a collegiate program and a preparatory program, roughly equivalent to a high school of the time; throughout its existence, the vast majority of students were enrolled in the preparatory program. Roughly a third of its students came from the children of recent immigrants from the North.

Writing in the American Home Missionary Society's member publication, Hubbell called the college "the natural result of home missionary work and northern immigration." He said the college was necessary to aid the "seventy-five per cent of its negroes and nearly twenty per cent of its white population [who] were unable to read. Voters that cannot read the ballots they cast are a dangerous class. They put our business interests and the institutions of liberty into the hands of unprincipled men and imperil the Republic."

But enrollment proved difficult to sustain. In 1891, the fall term began with only 22 total students. In 1893, the term began with only five collegiate students, "and not one of them fitted to enter even the lowest class in any regular college course." The following year, the local association of Congregational churches passed resolutions calling for Northern funding of the college to cease, stating "that we regret exceedingly its palpable lack of, and consequent waste of our denominational funds," and demanding Hubbell's ouster. But Hubbell remained in the position. Lake Charles College reported only a single collegiate graduate over a two-year span.

Congregational churches supported many schools in the South which served African Americans, including Straight University in New Orleans, but Lake Charles College was for whites only. This sparked controversy in 1896, after a Congregationalist pastor in New Iberia inquired about several Black students enrolling. Hubbell told the pastor, inaccurately, that Louisiana laws prevented mixed-race colleges. Knapp followed up with a letter saying "You are perfectly aware that we cannot have coeducation in any part of Louisiana. Public sentiment is unanimously opposed to it." Some northern critics, like The Independent, argued that "the colored people need its privileges quite as much as the white" and that "It would be a wrong to the givers for any Congregational society to continue to support such an institution."

In 1898, Hubbell told Congregational officials Lake Charles College was up to 106 preparatory students and 14 in the collegiate program, doubling enrollment in two years – but that while the previous year had been "the most prosperous it has ever had so far as its work," it was also "its worst in finances."

By 1899, the national Congregational Education Society considered Lake Charles College a near-lost cause, reporting that it "has unquestionably suffered a decline from which the society is at present unable to rescue it." Lake Charles College closed that year. Over the next few years, Hubbell moved to Detroit, New Haven, and New York City, where he died in 1907 at age 77.

== Revival and sale ==
The college building sat unused for about a year; control of the physical plant passed to Jabez B. Watkins, the Kansas developer who controlled the North American Land & Timber Co. Several groups considered opening another school there; a group of Louisiana Baptists considered using it to house the institution that later opened as Louisiana College in Pineville in 1906.

In September 1900, a new Lake Charles College opened in the old building. It was led by J. T. Barrett (1854–1939), who had previously been president of Acadia College in Crowley. Barrett had grown Acadia's enrollment from 40 to nearly 300 students in five years – but its building had been destroyed by fire in 1899. Barrett was a Baptist minister and a graduate of both Mississippi College and the Southern Baptist Theological Seminary, but the school was nondenominational.

Enrollment under Barrett was "larger than ever known in the history of the institution, and a larger number of boarders are present than ever before." The new institution was known variously as Lake Charles College, Acadia College, and Lake Charles Acadia College, though Acadia College seems to have been the most common.

This college was much more successful as an enterprise, but it only lasted two years. In 1902, Barrett announced he would not reopen the school for the next term, saying that the school's buildings were in decline, his wife was of poor health, and "the routine of school duties has become distasteful under these adverse conditions."

== Legacy ==
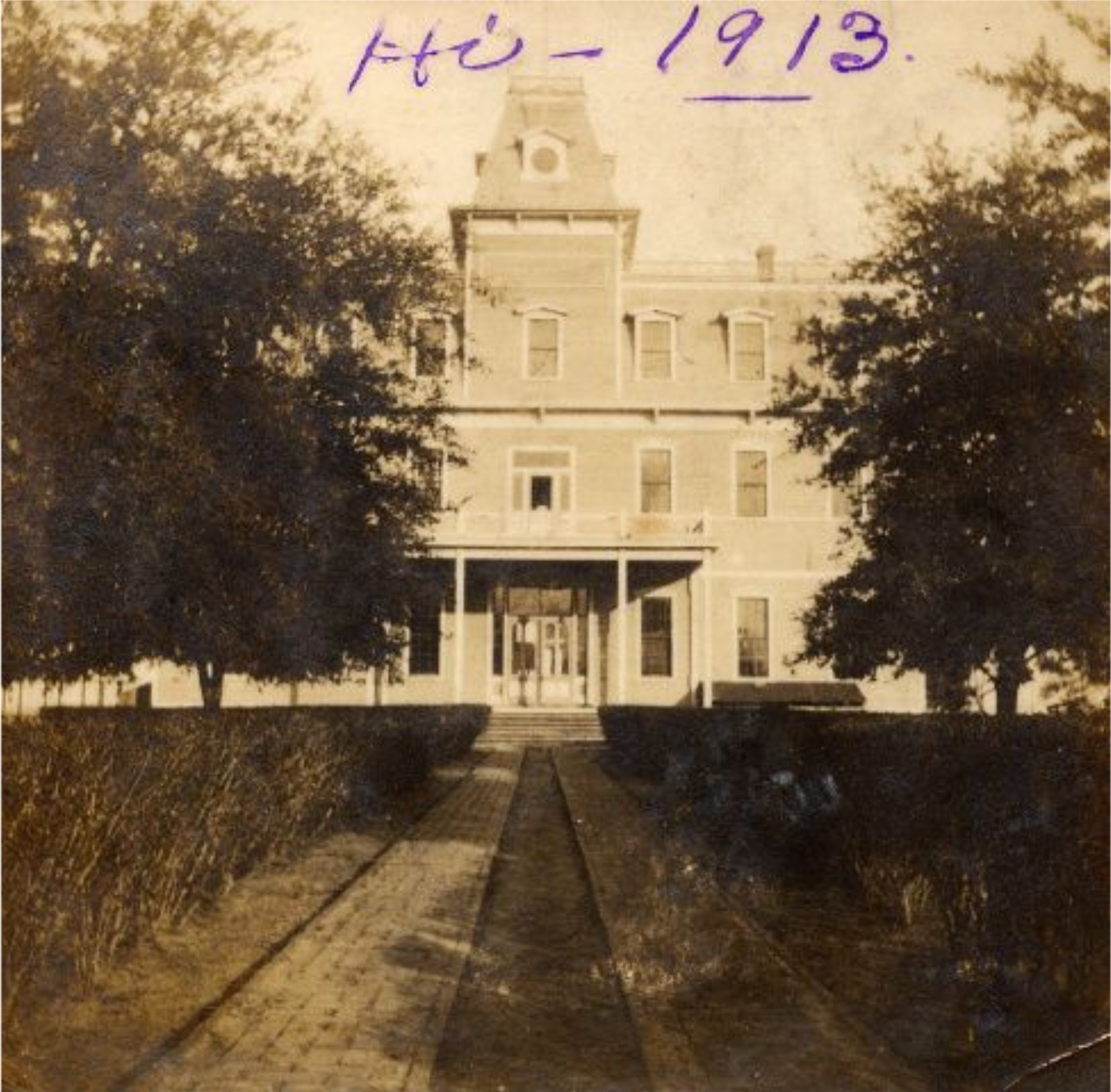
The college building as Lake Charles High School in 1913.

In 1903, Watkins agreed to sell the grounds of Lake Charles College for $7,000 to the local school board, converting it into the first campus of Lake Charles High School. Superintendent John McNeese arranged the purchase.

The old Lake Charles College was torn down and replaced with a new facility for Lake Charles High School in 1916. That building was destroyed by fire in 1951. As of 2023, the old site of the college is the location of the Lake Charles-Boston Academy of Learning.

Immediately after closing the college, J. T. Barrett was named superintendent of the Louisiana Baptist Orphanage, which was being relocating from near Mansfield to Lake Charles. He oversaw the construction of its campus across the street from his old college. The orphanage site is currently the location of St. Louis Catholic High School. Barrett spent the remainder of his life in a number of fields, including oil speculation, insurance, and rice milling. He remained active in the Baptist church, both as a preacher and in administrative roles, until his death in Lake Charles in 1939.

Lake Charles would not have a college again until 1939, when Lake Charles Junior College opened as a branch campus of Louisiana State University. It became McNeese State College in 1950 and took its current name, McNeese State University, in 1970.

== Notable people ==
- Cyrus I. Scofield, founder, theologian, editor of the Scofield Reference Bible
- Seaman A. Knapp, board chairman, second president of the Iowa State Agricultural College (today Iowa State University)
- James W. Bryan, Progressive member of Congress from Washington (1913–1915), former student
