= Moderator (town official) =

A moderator is an official of an incorporated town who presides over the town meeting, and in some cases, other municipal meetings. In the United States, the New England town is best known for the town meeting form of government. The office of moderator exists in at least Connecticut, Maine, Massachusetts, New Hampshire, Rhode Island and Vermont.

== Maine ==
The moderator serves for the duration of the meeting. The election of the moderator is presided over by the town clerk.

== Massachusetts ==
Massachusetts moderators serve a term of one or three years, depending on the choice of each town. Vacancies in the office of moderator are filled by the voters. If the moderator is absent from a meeting, the voters elect a temporary moderator.

Some town moderators have the ability to directly appoint the town's finance committee; and in other towns, appoint a committee to appoint the finance committee.

== New Hampshire ==
Moderators serve for two years, beginning at the conclusion of the meeting at which they are elected (or when they qualify, if later). In addition to presiding at town meeting, moderators are the chief election officials.

In cities, moderators are in charge of polling places.

== Vermont ==
Before there were selectboards, clerks or treasurers in Vermont, even before there were established towns, there were moderators. When Governor Benning Wentworth chartered the first Vermont town in 1749, he appointed Col. William Williams to be the moderator of Bennington's first meeting, "which he is to Notify and Govern according to the Laws & Custom of our Said Province."

Vermont town meetings usually include two phases. The open discussion and voting by voice vote (with occasional paper ballots) occurs the first day, and is presided over by the moderator. The Australian ballot generally occurs the next day, and is presided over by the town clerk. In addition to town meetings, "moderators are needed by town school districts, union school districts, villages, and fire districts."

Town moderators are elected at the annual meeting and serve a one-year term. Usually towns have only one town meeting per year; this is the annual meeting. The moderator of a meeting will have been elected at the previous annual meeting.

It is important for moderators to be familiar with Robert's Rules of Order because these rules govern the town meeting (except when superseded by state law). The voters may appeal a ruling by the moderator and vote to overrule the moderator.
