= Charles O'Brien =

Charles O'Brien may refer to:

- Charles O'Brien, 5th Viscount Clare (1673–1706)
- Charles O'Brien, 8th Earl of Thomond (1699–1761), Irish military officer in French service
- Charles O'Brien, 9th Earl of Thomond (1757–1774)
- Charles O'Brien (colonial administrator) (1859–1935), British governor of the Seychelles (1912–1918) and Barbados (1918–1925)
- Charles O'Brien (cricketer) (1921–1980), Australian cricketer
- Charles F. X. O'Brien (1879–1940), United States representative from New Jersey
- Charles H. O'Brien (1920–2007), state senator and judge from Tennessee, United States
- Charles M. O'Brien (1875–1952), member of the Legislative Assembly of Alberta, Canada (1909–1913)
- Charles P. O'Brien (born 1939), American research scientist
- Charlie O'Brien (born 1960), retired American baseball player
- Charlie O'Brien (racing driver) (born 1955), Australian racing driver
- Charles O'Brien (unionist) (1933-2020), American labor union organizer

== See also ==
- Charles Bryan (disambiguation)
