= Richard Condon (politician) =

American politician

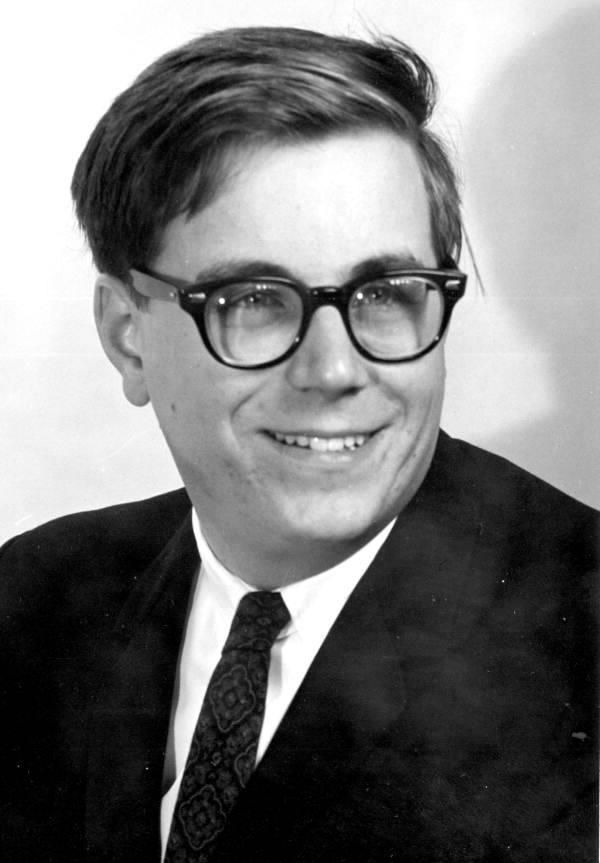
- Condon in 1966

Member of the Florida House of Representatives from Broward County
- In office 1966–1967

Personal details
- Party: Republican

Richard Condon is an American politician. He served as a Republican member of the Florida House of Representatives from 1966 to 1967.
