= Bryan Yipp =

Canadian biologist

Bryan Yipp is a Canadian biologist focusing in critical care medicine and internal medicine, currently a Canada Research Chair at University of Calgary.
