= Santa Ines =

Santa Ines (Santa Inés or Santa Inês) may refer to one of the following places:

== Places ==
Brazil

- Santa Inês, a city in Brazil

Chile

- Santa Inés Island, an island off the coast of southern Chile

Mexico

- Santa Inés del Monte, Oaxaca
- Santa Inés de Zaragoza, Oaxaca
- Santa Inés Yatzeche, Oaxaca

Spain

- Santa Inés, Province of Burgos, a village and municipality in Castile and León, Spain
