= Ine Poppe =

Dutch artist, journalist and writer (born 1960)

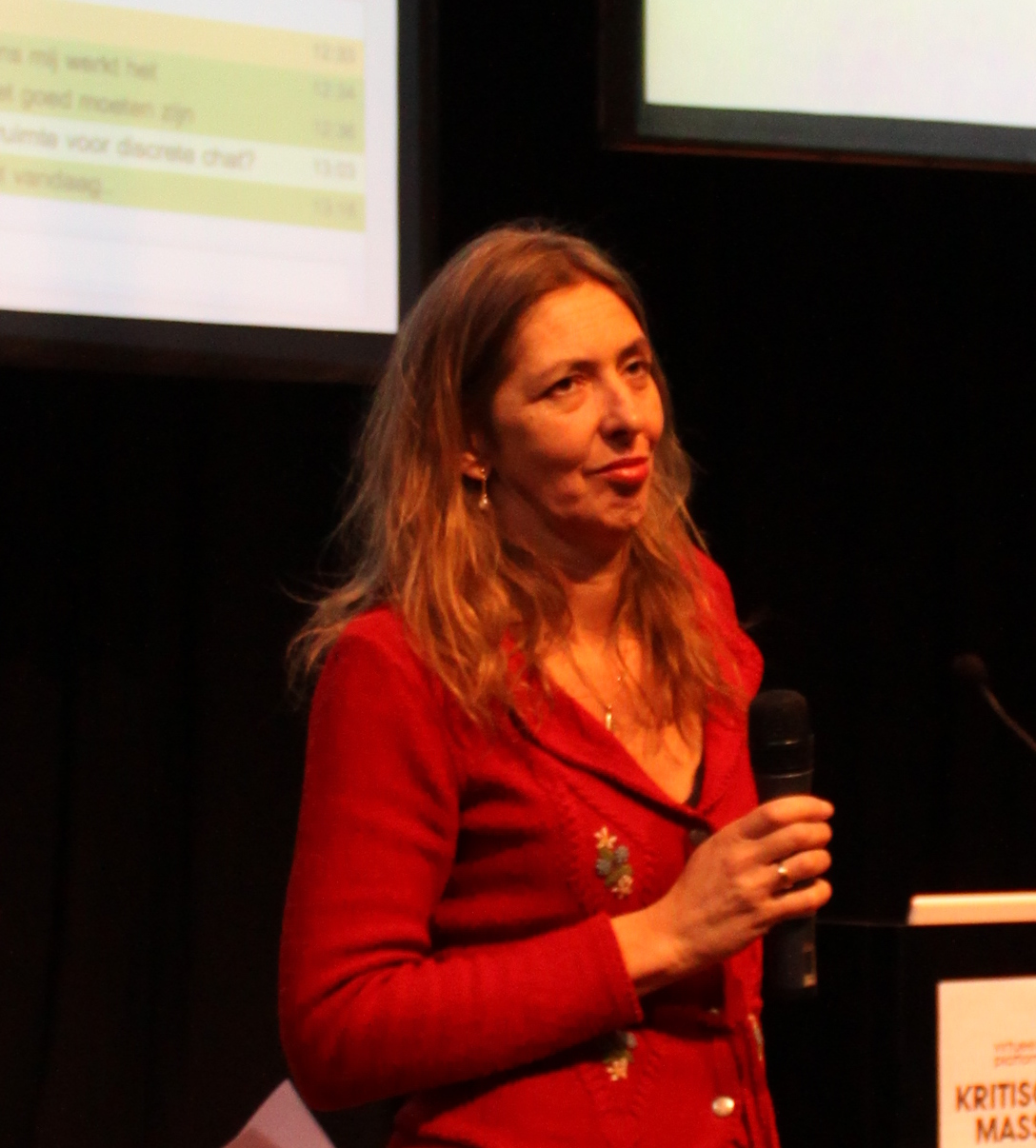
Ine Poppe, 2010

Ine Poppe (born 11 April 1960, Amsterdam) is a Dutch artist, journalist and writer.

In 1984 she created an art project called Mothers Milk Cheese, producing a cheese of her own milk. She has worked as a documentary film maker, script writer, and since 1997 contributor to the Dutch newspaper NRC Handelsblad. In 2002 she was awarded best European script for 'Necrocam, Death Online' at the Geneva Europe Grand Prix of the European Broadcasting Union. Her speciality is science and digital art.
