= John Bryan (footballer) =

English footballer

Personal information
- Full name: John Thomas Bryan
- Date of birth: 14 September 1877
- Place of birth: Coseley, England
- Date of death: 1940 (aged 62–63)
- Position: Winger

Senior career*
Years	Team	Apps	(Gls)
1899–1900	Wolverhampton Wanderers	9	(2)
1901	Blakenhall		
Total		9	(2)
- * Club domestic league appearances and goals

John Thomas Bryan (14 September 1877–1940) was an English footballer who played in the Football League for Wolverhampton Wanderers.
