= Ine Airport =

Airport in Marshall Islands

- IATA: IMI; ICAO: none; FAA LID: N20

Summary
- Serves: Ine, Arno Atoll, Marshall Islands
- Elevation AMSL: 4 ft (1.2 m)
- Coordinates: 07°01′N 171°29′E
- Interactive map of Ine Airport

Runways
| Direction | Length | | Surface |
| Direction | ft | m | Surface |
|---|---|---|---|
| 08/26 | 2,450 | 747 | Coral gravel |
- Source: Federal Aviation Administration

Ine Airport is a public use airstrip located in the village of Ine on Arno Atoll, Marshall Islands. This airstrip is assigned the location identifier N20 by the FAA and IMI by the IATA.

== Facilities ==
Ine Airport is at an elevation of 4 feet (1.2 m) above mean sea level. The runway is designated 08/26 with a coral gravel surface measuring 2,450 by 50 feet (747 x 15 m). There are no aircraft based at Ine.
