= Third Presbyterian Church (Greenville, South Carolina) =

Trinity Church of Greenville
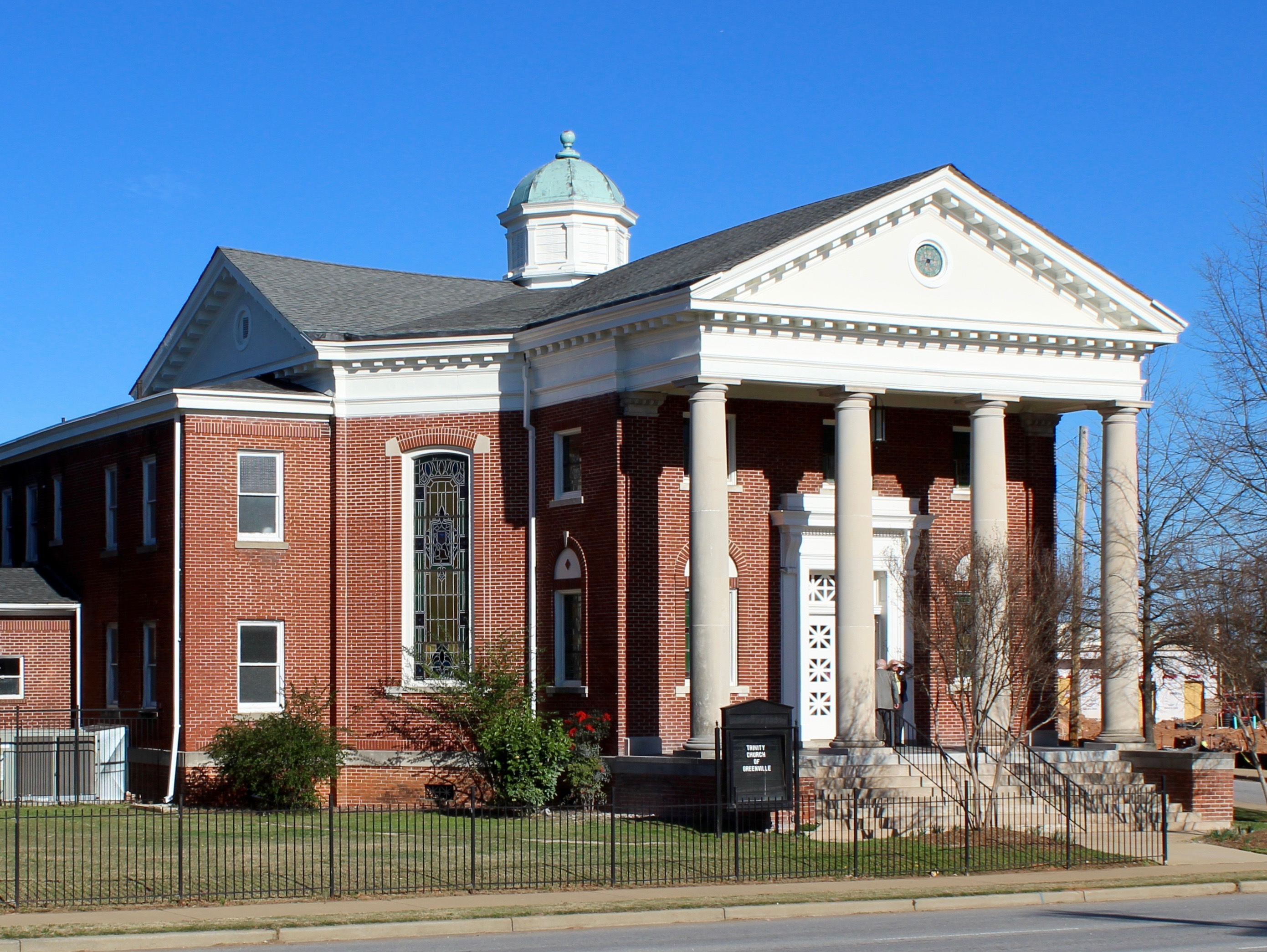
- Trinity Church of Greenville 2017

Religion
- Affiliation: Interdenominational Christian
- Status: active

Location
- Location: 100 Pete Hollis Blvd, Greenville, SC 29601
- State: South Carolina
- Interactive map of Trinity Church of Greenville
- Coordinates: 34°51′38.1″N 82°24′21.4″W

Architecture
- Type: church
- Groundbreaking: 1916
- Completed: 1920

Specifications
- Spire: 1
- Materials: Brick with stone and stucco trim

Website
- Trinity Church Of Greenville.com

Third Presbyterian Church is a historic church in Greenville, South Carolina, restored as a place of worship by the congregation of Trinity Church of Greenville, for which the latter received a 2016 State Preservation Honor Award from the South Carolina Department of Archives and History and the Palmetto Trust for Historic Preservation.

== History of Third Presbyterian Church ==
Third Presbyterian Church originated in 1887 as a mission of the Young Men's Working Society of First Presbyterian Church of Greenville. A Sunday school was first begun near the Southern Railway station and was then moved to Hampton Avenue. In 1893, the Palmer Presbyterian Church was organized from the Sunday school.

In 1916 the church began construction of a new building at what was then the corner of Buncombe and Echols Streets, the same year that the session changed the church name to Third Presbyterian. The auditorium, designed according to the Akron Plan, was completed in 1920. Early members included residents of nearby mill villages. Following a church split in 1938, the congregation began growing again under the leadership of W. McLeod Frampton Jr. (1908-2003), who served until 1943.

On November 19, 1946, a propane gas explosion at the Ideal Laundry across the street severely damaged the building, including shifting the octagonal-shaped roof and stressing the support beams in the ceiling—structural problems that remained unaddressed for another 70 years. Although Third Presbyterian was uninsured for damage done by the explosion and had to meet in an elementary school for several months thereafter, the church continued to grow and, by its 60th anniversary in 1954, it had more than 500 members. Thereafter, with the organization of other Presbyterian churches farther from the city center, membership at Third Presbyterian declined along with its urban neighborhood, and the church was eventually closed. By 2013, the vacant and vandalized building had effectively become a crack house.

== Building restoration by Trinity Church of Greenville ==
In 2013, the Foothills Presbytery (PCUSA) agreed to sell the property to Trinity Church of Greenville, a small, interdenominational assembly founded in 2011 and led by the Rev. Toni Pate. Although the church had fewer than 75 members, a fund drive brought in more $150,000 from the community (including $100,000 from a single Charlotte businessman), an organ, and pro bono assistance from Preservation South and a local stained glass studio. After extensive repairs, Trinity Church celebrated its fifth anniversary and the centenary of the building in 2016, and the restoration won a State Preservation Honor Award. The chair of the Greenville County Historic Preservation Commission, which had nominated the project, said that the building had been taken from "a derelict, blighted structure full of junk, fallen plaster and even human waste, to a beautiful space with wonderful acoustics."
