= James W. Bryan (Louisiana politician) =

American politician (1834–1897)

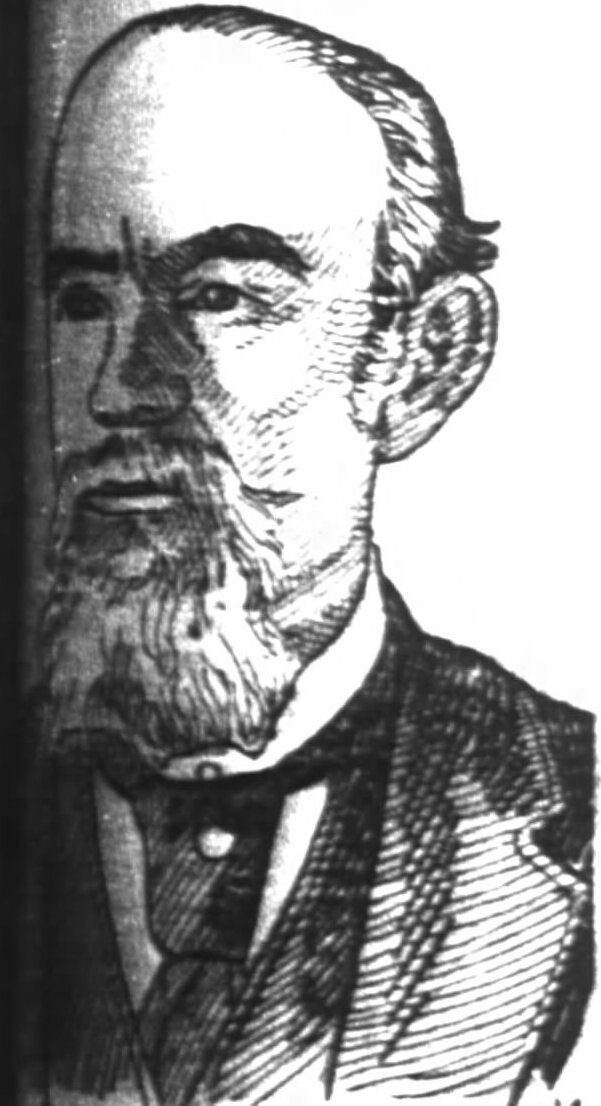
- Sketch of Bryan in a 1897 newspaper

Personal details
- Born: December 28, 1834 Calcasieu Parish, Louisiana, U.S.
- Died: June 17, 1897 (aged 62) Lake Charles, Louisiana, U.S.
- Resting place: Orange Grove Cemetery
- Spouse: Delia K. Singleton (m. 1869)
- Children: 8, including James
- Occupation: Politician; educator; businessman; newspaperman

James W. Bryan (December 28, 1834 – June 17, 1897) was an American politician, educator, businessman, and newspaperman from Louisiana. He served in the Louisiana General Assembly.

== Early life ==
James W. Bryan was born on December 28, 1834, in Calcasieu Parish, Louisiana. He was descended from Irish ancestors. Berwick Bay is named after one of his ancestors. He lived on a farm until his mother's death. He then entered school and pursued a literary course. Alongside his course, he taught.

== Civil War ==
In 1861, Bryan organized a militia of Calcasieu Parish and helped enlist four companies. In early 1862, he marched to Opelousas to report to duty. He then went to New Orleans and enlisted on April 15, 1862. He then went to Camp Moore where he joined the newly formed Company I of the 28th Louisiana Infantry Regiment under Allen Thomas. He commanded his regiment as acting major at the Siege of Vicksburg. He was captured and paroled on July 4, 1863, at Vicksburg. Following the battle, he was promoted to captain. He was paroled in Houston, Texas, on June 27, 1865.

== Career ==
Following the war, Bryan resumed teaching until 1869 and then opened a mercantile business in Lake Charles. He continued that business until 1884. In 1871, he became owner and editor of the Lake Charles Echo. He continued running the paper until he sold the plant and retired as editor on March 14, 1890. Later in life in the 1890s, he engaged in real estate business.

Bryan served as mayor and councilman of Lake Charles. He was also a representative on the Board of Police Jurors. He served in the Louisiana General Assembly.

== Personal life ==
Bryan married Delia K. Singleton on September 9, 1869. They had three sons and five daughters. His son James W. Bryan served as U.S. Representative in Washington.

Bryan died on June 17, 1897, at his home in Lake Charles. He was buried in Orange Grove Cemetery. His obituary states he was designated as the "Father of Lake Charles and the tall pine of Calcasieu".

== Legacy ==
In September 1981, Captain James W. Bryan Camp No. 1390 of the Sons of Confederate Veterans in Lake Charles was named in his honor.
