= Third Presbyterian Church (Birmingham, Alabama) =

Coordinates: 33.5075°N 86.796944°W

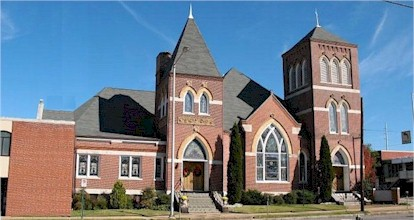
Third Presbyterian, November 2006

The Third Presbyterian Church of Birmingham, Alabama is a Presbyterian church located on the city's Southside at 617 22nd Street South, at the corner of 7th Avenue South. It is a member congregation of the Presbyterian Church in America.

== A short history of Third ==
Third Presbyterian was organized on July 11, 1884. The church was an outgrowth of a "Sabbath" school established by First Presbyterian Church. After six months of operation, which included a two-week revival service under a "Gospel Tent," the Third Presbyterian Church of Birmingham was organized. The church began with 31 charter members and was served by four supply pastors between 1884 and 1888.

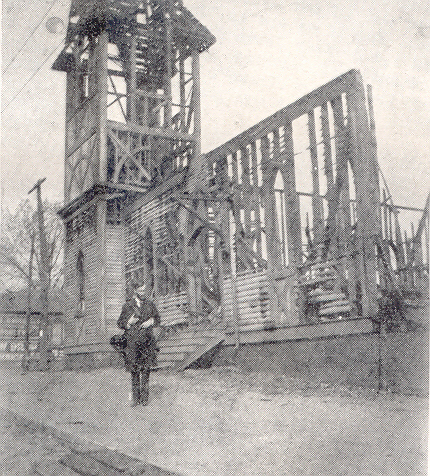
Bryan observes the damage of the 1901 fire.

By 1889, Third had grown to over 500 members, commissioning over 50 of its own to begin churches in the nearby communities of Woodlawn, Leeds, and South Highlands. That same year, on August 4, the church's first permanent pastor was installed, James Alexander Bryan; he had been a visiting preacher at Third while a seminary student at Princeton University. He would later become known to virtually everyone in Birmingham as "Brother Bryan." Bryan would continue to serve the church and the city for 52 years.

Also in this period, the congregation undertook the task of constructing a building. The original building, located at 6th Avenue South and 22nd Street South, cost about $5300 and was dedicated in January 1891, free of debt. The building was enjoyed for a decade, until April 17, 1901, when an apparent spark from a passing streetcar ignited something in the barn adjacent to Brother Bryan's house. The fire subsequently spread to the house and church. The building completely destroyed, the congregation would continue meeting in a tent, without missing a service, until a new church building was constructed a block down the street on the corner of 7th Avenue. After Bryan's death in 1941, assistant minister James Cantrell became the full-time pastor until his retirement in May 1978. Richard C. Trucks served as pastor from 1978 to 2019; Michael Brock is the current pastor.

== The current building ==
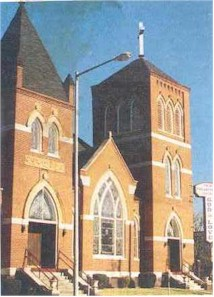
The church in the 1980s

Completed in 1902, the church sanctuary and chapel remain essentially the same today. Only the corner steeple/tower is different, as the original was severely damaged by lightning in the 1930s. The tower was refitted with a less steep roof line, giving a slightly different appearance than the side tower which still maintains the original sharp-angled roof.

Immediately adjacent to the church was Brother Bryan's house, which had become the "Sunday School Annex." In 1959, the house was razed for the construction of a new addition to the church, the "Bryan Educational Building," which was dedicated on December 11, 1960. In 1963, the corner tower was ornamented by an electric, vertical corner sign that read "God is Love" (replacing a previous, more subtle sign with the same message) and in 1972, it was capped with a large, electric cross on its apex.

The sanctuary and chapel (the original structure) underwent a major renovation/restoration from 1993 to 1995. While entailing considerable structural repair, the restoration also gave a facelift to the interior as well as seeing the removal of the sign & cross on the corner tower. The cross was replaced by a smaller metal-cast cross, matching the metal apex piece of the side tower.
