= Bryan Fairfax (disambiguation) =

Bryan Fairfax (1925–2014) was an Australian conductor.

Bryan or Brian Fairfax may also refer to:

- Bryan Fairfax, 8th Lord Fairfax of Cameron (1736–1802), boyhood friend of George Washington, first American-born member of the House of Lords
- Bryan Fairfax (cricketer) (1873–1950), English cricketer and British Army officer
- Brian Fairfax (1633–1711), English politician

== See also ==
- Sir Brian Fulke Cameron-Ramsay-Fairfax-Lucy, 5th Baronet (1898–1974), of the Cameron-Ramsay-Fairfax-Lucy baronets
