= Michael Bryan =

Michael Bryan may refer to:

- Mike Bryan (born 1978), American tennis player
- Michael Bryan (art historian) (1757–1821), English art historian
- Mike Bryan (musician) (1916–1972), American jazz guitarist
- Michael Bryan (footballer) (born 1990), English footballer
