= Bryan Smithson =

American basketball player

No. 10 – Tuři Svitavy
- Position: Point guard
- League: 2. Basketball Bundesliga

Personal information
- Born: June 18, 1985 (age 41)
- Listed height: 6 ft 0 in (1.83 m)
- Listed weight: 176 lb (80 kg)

Career information
- High school: North Cobb (Kennesaw, Georgia)
- College: Middle Tennessee (2003–2005); UNC Asheville (2006–2008)
- NBA draft: 2008: undrafted
- Playing career: 2008–present

Career history
- 2008–2009: Siroki Eronet
- 2013–2015: Kirchheim Knights
- 2015–2017: MLP Academics Heidelberg
- 2017–present: Tuři Svitavy

Bryan Smithson (born June 18, 1985) is an American professional basketball player who formerly played for the Academics Heidelberg of the German Basketball League ProA.
