= Institut für Nukleare Entsorgung =

Large German research center

Coordinates: 49°5′58″N 8°25′54″E

The Institut für Nukleare Entsorgung (English: Institute for Nuclear Waste Disposal) is a large German research center at Karlsruhe Institute of Technology where R&D in the field of safe disposal of nuclear waste is being provided. It is located 1 kilometre (0.62 mi) east of Linkenheim-Hochstetten.
