= Robert Davies Roberts =

Welsh adult educationist (1851–1911)

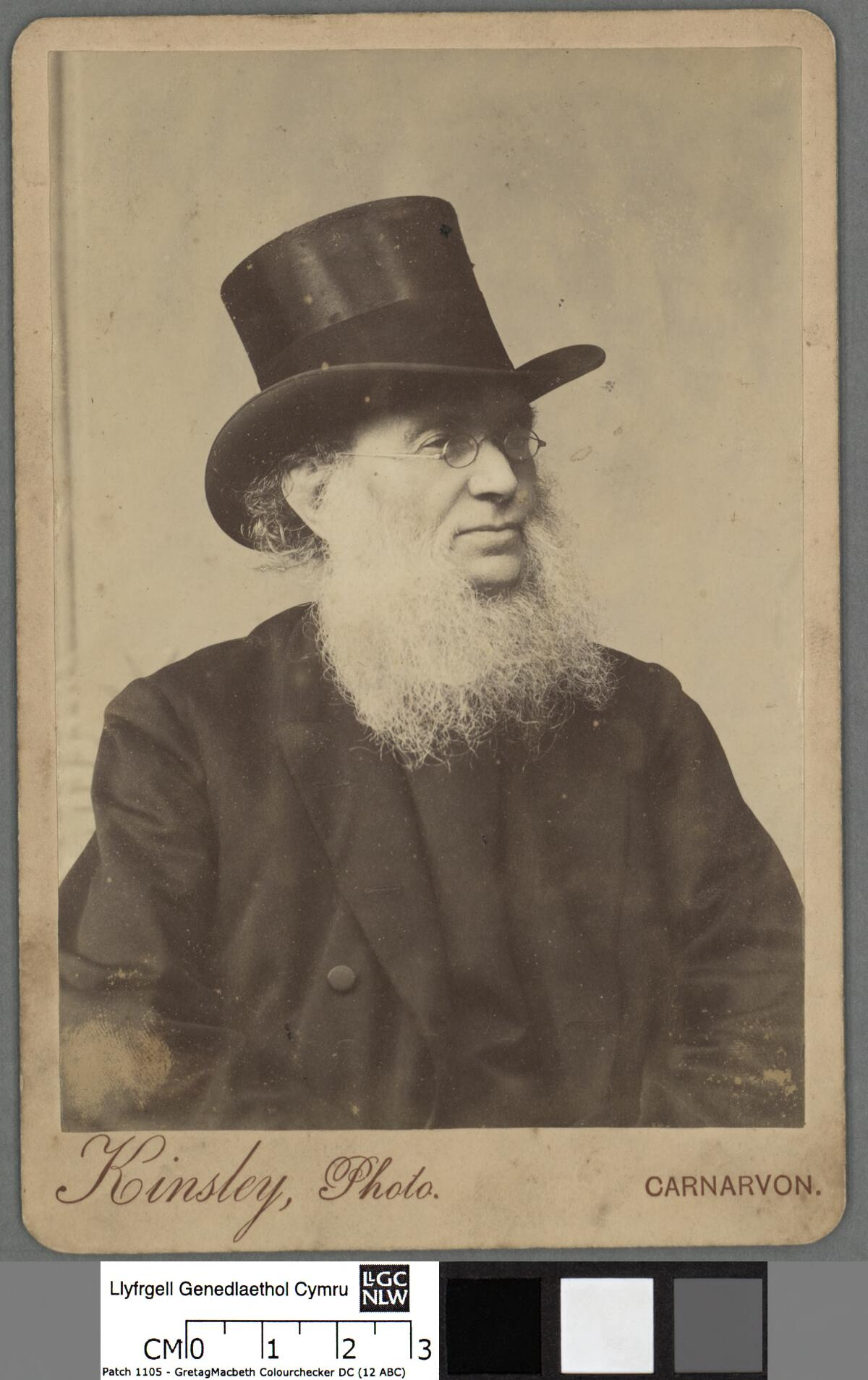
Robert Davies Roberts

Robert Davies Roberts (1851–1911) was a Welsh academic and educational administrator, best known in the field of adult education.

== Life ==
Born at Aberystwyth on 5 March 1851, he was the eldest son of Richard Roberts, a timber merchant and shipowner there, and was brought up a Calvinistic Methodist. From a private school at Shrewsbury he went to the Liverpool Institute, and then on to University College, London. Here he distinguished himself in geology; he graduated B.Sc. in the University of London with first-class honours and scholarship in that subject in 1870. In 1871 he entered the University of Cambridge, as foundation scholar of Clare College, graduating B.A. in 1875 as second (bracketed) in the first class of the natural science tripos. He proceeded M.A. at Cambridge and D.Sc. at London in 1878; and was from 1884 to 1890 fellow of Clare College. He became fellow of University College, London, in 1888.

Meanwhile, Roberts was lecturer in chemistry at University College, Aberystwyth, during 1877, and in 1884 was appointed university lecturer in geology at Cambridge. He changed direction, with an ambition to organise and develop higher education among the classes that were at that time not touched by the universities. In 1881 he had become assistant and organising secretary to the syndicate at Cambridge which had been formed in 1873 to control the "local lectures" or 'university extension' work. Here he worked with James Stuart and George Forrest Browne. From 1885 to 1904 he was secretary to the London Society for the Extension of University Teaching, an independent organisation to in the metropolitan area.

In 1894 Roberts returned to Cambridge to take charge of the work under the Cambridge syndicate; and eight years later he became the first registrar of the Extension Board in the University of London. In the new University of Wales he served as junior deputy chancellor (1903–5) and as chairman (1910–11) of the executive committee of the court, on which he sat as one of the representatives of the college of his native town. He was J.P. for Cardiganshire, and high sheriff of the county (1902–3).

A longtime lecturer for the Gilchrist Educational Trust, Roberts acted as its secretary from 1899 for the rest of his life. He was a student of law at the Middle Temple, but was not called to the bar. He was a broad-based activist for the improvement of educational opportunities, and a liberal in politics. He opposed as inadequate the proposal by Albert Mansbridge to limit working men to non-graduate university courses.

In 1911 Roberts was appointed secretary of the Congress of the Universities of the Empire which the University of London, with the co-operation of other British universities, organised for the summer of 1912. In June 1911 he attended a preliminary conference of Canadian universities at Montreal, bur suddenly died of calcification of the coronary arteries at his house at Kensington on 14 November 1911. His body was cremated at Golders Green, and he was subsequently buried with public honours at Aberystwyth. In his memory two scholarships for the encouragement of university extension work were founded by public subscription, the administration of the fund being undertaken by the Gilchrist trustees.

== Works ==
Roberts wrote:

- Eighteen Years of University Extension (1891)
- Earth's History: an Introduction to Modern Geology (1893)

== Family and legacy ==
Roberts married in 1888 Mary, eldest daughter of Philip S. King of Brighton. He left no children, and by his will he bequeathed the residue of his estate to Aberystwyth College, to form the nucleus of a fund for sabbatical leave.
