= John Bryan (cricketer) =

English cricketer

Personal information
- Full name: John Bryan
- Born: 17 October 1841; Lower Slaughter, Gloucestershire
- Died: 24 June 1909 (aged 67); Minchinhampton, Gloucestershire England
- Batting: Right-handed

Domestic team information
- Years: Team
- 1873: Gloucestershire

Career statistics
Competition	First-class
Matches	2
Runs scored	34
Batting average	17.00
100s/50s	0/0
Top score	24
Catches/stumpings	4/–
- Source: Cricinfo, 28 October 2011

John Bryan (17 October 1841 – 24 June 1909) was an English cricketer. Bryan was a right-handed batsman. He was born at Lower Slaughter, Gloucestershire.

Bryan made two first-class appearances for Gloucestershire against Surrey and Sussex in 1873, scoring 34 runs at a batting average of 17.00, with a high score of 24.

He died at Minchinhampton, Gloucestershire on 24 June 1909.
