= Frank Bryan (cricketer) =

English cricketer

Frank Bryan (12 September 1853 – 11 June 1923) was an English first-class cricketer active 1891 who played for Middlesex as a wicketkeeper. He was born in Amersham; died in Quainton.
