= Frank M. Bryan =

American academic

Frank M. Bryan is a retired John G. McCullough Professor of Political Science at the University of Vermont. He is a noted local scholar, author and humorist, having written and co-written over ten books and numerous articles.

His areas of teaching and research include Public Administration, American Government, and State and Local Government. He has conducted extensive research on the Vermont town meeting and has developed a mathematical model for predicting voter turnout.

== Early life and career ==
The son of a single mother who worked in a local mill, Bryan was one of seven students in his graduating class at Newbury High School.

Professor Bryan received a Bachelor of Arts in Political Science from St. Michael's College in 1963, a master's degree from the University of Vermont in 1965 and a PhD. in Political Science from the University of Connecticut in 1970.

== Writings ==
Bill Kauffman has called Bryan's book Real Democracy "the definitive work on town meeting," and has written that:

Bryan was a legendary character at the University of Vermont, where he taught political science: he is the horny-handed son of toil who does regression analysis, the regular-guy intellectual who prefers the company of “working-class people ... the old Vermonters.” The irrepressible Bryan has made a major contribution to his field (and his country, which is Vermont) with Real Democracy (University of Chicago Press), his magnum opus, the most searching and sympathetic book ever written about the town-meeting democracy of New England. The book is a veritable four-leaf clover of academia: a witty work of political science written from a defiantly rural populist point of view.

Some of his other books include All Those In Favor: Rediscovering the Secrets of Town Meeting and Community, The Vermont Papers: Recreating Democracy on a Human Scale (with John McClaughry), OUT! The Vermont Secession Book (with Bill Mares), and Real Vermonters Don't Milk Goats.

== Quotes ==
“While many seek the truth by scanning galaxies through powerful telescopes, my eyes have been glued to a microscope—looking down, not up, inward, not outward. America has often seemed transfixed by big. I am captivated by small.”
