= Brother Bryan =

James Alexander Bryan, known as Brother Bryan, (March 20, 1863, near Kingstree, South Carolina – January 28, 1941, in Birmingham, Alabama) was a pastor of Third Presbyterian Church in Birmingham, Alabama.

Bryan came to Birmingham while he was still studying at Princeton Theological Seminary to serve as part-time pastor of Third Presbyterian Church. After graduating in 1889, he was ordained and installed as the full-time minister on August 4. As a minister, he conducted large evangelistic and prayer gatherings with various groups across the city and region.

Bryan's biography Religion in Shoes, by Hunter Blakely

He was an outspoken supporter of civil rights and racial reconciliation in Birmingham. He is best remembered, however, for his tireless efforts to help the poor and homeless. It is said he would often arrive home at night without his overcoat because he had given it away to a stranger during the day. Though he was an ordained minister and honorary Doctor, he earned the title "brother" by addressing anyone he met as brother or sister. His life and ministry were recounted by author Hunter Blakely in the 1934 book Religion in Shoes.

A 1934 statue of Brother Bryan kneeling in prayer by Georges Bridges is one of Birmingham's best-known landmarks, although it has been moved several times: From Five Points South to Vulcan Park and back to Five Points South. The "Brother Bryan Mission" was founded in 1940 to continue his work with the less fortunate. The City of Birmingham renamed Magnolia Park as "Brother Bryan Park". Bryan Memorial Presbyterian church in suburban Birmingham is also named in his honor.

He was elected in 2002 to the Alabama Men's Hall of Fame.
