= Robert Bryan =

Robert Bryan (and variants) may refer to:

- Robert Jensen Bryan (born 1934), United States federal judge
- Robert A. Bryan (1926–2017), American university professor and university president
- Bob Bryan (born 1978), American tennis player
- Bob Bryan (geologist), Australian geologist
- Robert Bryan (tennis) (fl. 1930s), American tennis player, in 1935 U.S. National Championships – Men's Singles
- Robert Bryan (poet) (1858–1920), Welsh folklorist
