= Inés Bryan =

Dominican Republic medic and politician (died 2019)

The Honourable Inés Bryan

Member of the Chamber of Deputies of the Dominican Republic for the province of San Pedro de Macorís
- In office 16 August 2016 – 28 December 2019

Secretary-General of the Dominican Medic College

Personal details
- Born: Inés Xiomara Bryan Casey
- Died: 28 December 2019
- Party: Social Christian Reformist Party
- Parent: Masiel Casey (mother)
- Profession: Medic
- Ethnicity: Black Dominican, Cocolo
- Website: Inés Bryan on Facebook

Inés Bryan, in full Inés Xiomara Bryan Casey, was a medic and politician from the Dominican Republic. She died on 28 December 2019 from a heart attack.

Bryan had a doctorate in medicine. She was secretary-general of the Dominican Medic College; she served as deputy for San Pedro de Macorís Province since 16 August 2016 and presided the Chamber's Permanent Committee on Social Security.
