= Smets =

Smets is a Dutch occupational surname. It is a common name in the Belgian provinces of Antwerp and Flemish Brabant (11,000 people in 1998). Despite its similarity to the Dutch surnames Smet, Smits, and Smeets, each equivalent to Smith, Smets (sometimes?) originated from "des Mets", short for "des Metselaars" ("the mason's son"). People named Smets include:

- Alexander Smets (1795–1862), French philanthropist
- Dieudonné Smets (1901–1981), Belgian road cyclist
- Henri Smets (1896–1994), Belgian cross country athlete
- Joël Smets (born 1969), Belgian motocross rider
- Rob Smets (born 1959), American rodeo bullfighter and commentator
- Sonja Smets, Belgian and Dutch logician
- Wilhelm Smets (1796–1848), German writer, journalist and politician

SMETS, short for Smart Metering Equipment Technical Specifications, is a British standard for home smart meters.

== See also ==
- Smet
- Smits
- Smeets
- De Smet (surname)
