= Smits =

- Language: Dutch

Origin
- Meaning: variant of Smit, which derives from the Dutch word for metal worker
- Region of origin: Netherlands

Other names
- Variant forms: Smit (by origin); Smith (by meaning); Smeets

Smits is a Dutch surname that is considered a variant of the more common Smit surname. The name is an old plural of Smid (blacksmith), though the plural in modern Dutch would be Smeden.

== Frequency of occurrence in general populations ==
Information for surname frequency in the Netherlands is limited by the end of comprehensive census taking in 1971. The most recent readily available information is based on the 1947 census, for which both raw census data and surname frequency data have been made available to the general public. In 1947 there were 15,151 recorded people with the surname Smits, while the general census provides a figure of 9,519,000 as the 1947 population. Working with this data the frequency of the Smits surname in the Netherlands in 1947 can be calculated to be ~0.159% or ~1,590 of every 1,000,000 people, which is ½ the frequency of the surname Smit, of which Smits is a variant. In 2007 there were 23,205 carriers of this surname in The Netherlands and 3,888 in Belgium.

== Notable people sharing the Smits surname ==
- Alexander Smits (born 1948), Australian-American engineer
- Andreas Smits (1870–1948), Dutch physical chemist
- Anita Smits (born 1967), Dutch archer
- Bart Smits (born 1972), Dutch heavy metal singer
- Eva Smits (1906–1992), Dutch freestyle swimmer
- George Smits (1944–1997), Belgian inventor of experimental musical instruments
- Glenn Smits (born 1990), Dutch tennis player
- Gregory Smits (born 1960), American historian and Japanologist
- Hans Smits (born 1956), Dutch water polo player
- Hendrik Smits (1907–1976), Dutch rower
- Inger Smits (born 1994), Dutch handball player
- Jakob Smits (1855–1928), Dutch painter
- Jan M. Smits (born 1967), Dutch law professor
- Jean Baptiste Smits 1792–1857), Belgian politician
- Jeroen Smits (born 1972), Dutch cricketer
- Jimmy Smits (born 1955), American actor
- John Smits (born 1988), Canadian soccer player
- Jorn Smits (born 1992), Dutch handball player
- Jos. Smits van Waesberghe (1901–1986), Dutch musicologist
- Joshua Smits (born 1992), Dutch footballer
- Louisa Smits (born 1940s), Belgian racing cyclist
- Ludowyk Smits (1635–1707), Dutch painter
- Lukas Smits (born 1935), Dutch painter
- Manja Smits (born 1985), Dutch politician
- Marije Smits (born 1986), Dutch Paralympic sprinter
- Milan Smits (born 2004), Belgian footballer
- Pepijn Smits (born 1996), Dutch swimmer
- Rik Smits (born 1966), Dutch basketball player
- Rik Smits (linguist) (born 1953), Dutch linguist, author, and journalist
- Robert-Jan Smits (born 1958), Dutch civil servant
- Seppe Smits (born 1991), Belgian snowboarder
- Simon Smits (born 1955), Dutch ambassador to the United Kingdom
- Sonja Smits (born 1955), Canadian actress
- Tim Smits (born 1986), Australian footballer
- Ton Smits (1921–1981), Dutch cartoonist
- Twan Smits (born 1985), Dutch footballer
- William Smits (1704–1770), Dutch Franciscan orientalist and exegete
- Willie Smits (born 1957), Dutch conservationist
- Xenia Smits (born 1994), German handball player
- Yanis Smits or Jānis Šmits (1941–2020), Canadian Latvian Baptist bishop

== See also ==
- Klaas Smits River, a river in South Africa
