= Smet =

Smet is a Dutch occupational surname. Smet is a regional form of Smid ("Smith") and is equivalent to the more abundant surname Smit. It is common in East Flanders. People named Smet include:

- David Smet (born 1966), French singer/songwriter and amateur sports car racer
- Eugenia Smet (1825–1871), French founder of the Society of Helpers of the Holy Souls
- Henrich Smet (1535/7-1614), Flemish court physician and humanist
- Kathleen Smet (born 1970), Belgian triathlete
- Jean-Philippe Smet (1943–2017), French singer and actor, father of David and Laura
- Laura Smet (born 1983), French actress
- Marc Smet (born 1951), Belgian long-distance runner
- Miet Smet (1943–2024), Belgian politician
- Mike Smet (born 1991), Belgian footballer
- Pascal Smet (born 1967), Belgian politician, Flemish government minister
- Tony Smet (born 1870, date of death unknown), Belgian fencer

== See also ==
- Smets, surname
- De Smet (surname)
- De Smet (disambiguation)
