= Smit =

- Language: Dutch

Origin
- Meaning: smith
- Region of origin: Netherlands

Other names
- Variant forms: De Smet; Smeets; Smet; Smith; Smits

Smit is a Dutch occupational surname. It represents an archaic spelling of the Dutch word "smid" for "smith" (metal worker) and is the Dutch equivalent of the English and Scottish surname Smith.

== Frequency of occurrence in general populations ==
Information for surname frequency in the Netherlands is limited by the end of comprehensive census taking in the year 1971. The most recent readily available information is based on the 1947 census, for which both raw census data and surname frequency data have been made available to the general public. In 1947 there were 29,783 recorded people with the surname Smit, while the general census provides a figure of 9,519,000 as the 1947 population. Working with this data the frequency of the Smit surname in the Netherlands in 1947 can be calculated to be ≈0.313% or ≈3,130 of every 1,000,000 people. By comparison, the most common Dutch surname in the 1947 data was de Jong, which had a frequency of ≈0.580%.

An imperfect comparison can be made to primary English-speaking countries as of 1998 based on research by the National Trust. In 1998, the highest frequency was observed in New Zealand as 97.18 occurrences per million people, or ~1/30th the rate found in the Netherlands of 50 years before. Among the nations examined in the National Trust study, relative frequencies for 1991 were: New Zealand > Australia ≅ Canada ≫ United States > Northern Ireland > Great Britain > Republic of Ireland. The difference between Canada and the United States indicated in this series is approximately 3.5 fold.

== People surnamed Smit ==
Arts

- Aernout Smit (1641–1710), Dutch painter
- André Smit (1916–2001), Dutch musician
- Anton Smit (b. 1945), Dutch screenwriter, television and film producer
- Arie Smit (1916–2016), Dutch-born Indonesian painter
- Bartho Smit (1924–1986), South African writer, poet, dramatist and director
- Carola Smit (b. 1963), Dutch singer
- Carolein Smit (b. 1960), Dutch ceramic art sculptor
- Floortje Smit (b. 1983), Dutch singer
- Gabriël Smit (1910–1981), Dutch poet and journalist
- Ger Smit (1933–2012), Dutch voice actor
- Gert Smit (1944–1998), South African singer known as "Gene Rockwell"
- Guy Richards Smit (b. 1970), American performance artist
- Howard Smit (1911–2009), American film make-up artist
- Huub Smit (b. 1978), Dutch actor
- Jan Smit (b. 1985), Dutch singer
- Joseph Smit (1836–1929), Dutch zoological illustrator
- Leo Smit (1900–1943), Dutch composer and pianist
- Leo Smit (1921–1999), American composer
- Lionel Smit (b. 1982), South African artist
- Lisa Smit (b. 1993), Dutch actress
- Louise Smit (b. 1940), South African children's writer
- Marianne Smit (b. 1984), Dutch harpist
- Monique Smit (b. 1989), Dutch singer and television presenter
- Peter Smit (b. 1952), Dutch children's writer and publicist
- Pierre Jacques Smit (1863–1960), Dutch natural history illustrator in England
- Sjoukje Smit (b. 1950), Dutch singer known as "Maggie McNeal"
- Wisse Alfred Pierre Smit (1903–1986), Dutch poet and literary historian

Politics

- Adalbert Smit (1897–1994), Dutch Esperantist and politician
- Carry Pothuis-Smit (1872–1951), Dutch suffragist and SDAP politician
- Els Veder-Smit (1921–2020), Dutch VVD politician
- Jaap Smit (b. 1957), Dutch trade unionist and King's Commissioner
- Joke Smit (1933–1981), Dutch feminist and politician
- Michiel Smit (b. 1976), Dutch politician
- Neelie Smit (b. 1941), Dutch politician
- Nico Smit, Namibian politician
- Nicolaas Smit (1832–1896), South African Boer general and politician
- Paul Smit (b. 1953), Namibian politician and farmer
- Pieter Smit (1963–2018), Dutch politician
- Rachelle Smit, American politician
- Robert Smit (1933–1977), South African economist and politician

Sports

- Alec Smit (b. 1999), Dutch handball player
- Alexander Smit (b. 1985), Dutch baseball player
- Angie Smit (b. 1991), New Zealand middle-distance runner
- Anika Smit (b. 1986), South African high jumper
- Arij Smit (1907–1970), Dutch boxer
- Arjan Smit (b.1978), Dutch inline-skater
- Arvid Smit (b. 1980), Dutch footballer
- Daryn Smit (b. 1984), South African cricketer
- David Smit (b. 1976), English cricketer
- Dennis Smit (b. 1981), Dutch cyclist
- Dillon Smit (b. 1992), South African rugby player
- Ettiene Smit (b. 1974), South African strongman
- G. H. Smit (b. 1976), Guernsey cricket player
- Gretha Smit (b. 1976), Dutch speedskater
- Hans Smit (b. 1958), Indonesia-born Filipino football manager
- Heinrich Smit (rugby union) (b. 1990), Namibian rugby player
- Jan Smit (b. 1983), Dutch footballer
- Jane Smit (b. 1972), English cricketer
- Janine Smit (b. 1991), Dutch speed skater
- Jasper Smit (b. 1980), Dutch tennis player
- Jennifer Smit (b. 1958), Dutch shot putter
- Jesse Smit (b. 1996), South African cricketer
- JJ Smit (b. 1995), Namibian cricketer
- Johann Smit (b. 1994), South African cricketer
- John Smit (b. 1978), South African rugby player and executive
- Julia Smit (b. 1987), American swimmer
- Kees Smit (b. 2006), Dutch footballer
- Kick Smit (1911–1974), Dutch footballer
- Klaas Smit (1930–2008), Dutch footballer
- Luke van der Smit (b. 1994), Namibian rugby player
- Maaike Smit (b. 1966), Dutch wheelchair tennis player
- Marjan Smit (b. 1975), Dutch softball player
- Marnix Smit (b. 1975), Dutch footballer
- Minouche Smit (b. 1975), Dutch swimmer
- Nicolaas Smit (1979–2014), South African rugby player
- Peter Smit (1961–2005), Dutch martial artist
- Riaan Smit (b. 1984), South African rugby player
- Rie Smit-Vierdag (1905–2005), Dutch freestyle swimmer
- Roelof Smit (b. 1993), South African rugby player
- Sylvia Smit (b. 1986), Dutch footballer
- Theo Smit (1951–2023), Dutch road bicycle racer
- Willie Smit (b. 1992), South African cyclist
- Yasemin Smit (b. 1984), Dutch water polo player

Other

- Barry Smit (b. 1948), Canadian geographer
- Bart Smit (b. 1940), Dutch toy store owner
- Flip Smit (b. 1936), South African demographer and educator
- Fop Smit (1777–1866), Dutch naval architect, shipbuilder, and shipowner, founder of Smit International
- Jan Smit (paleontologist) (b. 1948), Dutch paleontologist
- Jan Smit (physicist) (b. 1943), Dutch theoretical physicist
- Johannes Olav Smit (1883–1972), Dutch Roman Catholic bishop
- Jörgen Smit (1916–1991), Norwegian teacher and writer
- Lou Smit (1935–2010), American police detective
- Mabel Wisse Smit (b. 1968), Dutch widow of Prince Friso of Orange Nassau
- Neil Smit (b. 1959), American businessman and CEO
- Tim Smit (b. 1954), Dutch-born British archaeologist, music producer and gardener

== Compound surnames ==
- Arie Jan Haagen-Smit (1900–1977), Dutch chemist
- Christian Reus-Smit (b. 1961), Australian international relations scholar
- Sianoa Smit-McPhee (b. 1992), Australian actress
- Kodi Smit-McPhee (b. 1996), Australian actor

== People surnamed Šmit ==
- Jože Šmit (1922–2004), Slovene poet, translator, editor and journalist
- Vlado Šmit (b. 1980), Serbian footballer
