= Martinus Fabri =

North Netherlandish composer

Martinus Fabri (died May 1400) was a composer of the late 14th century.

Fabri was probably either from the County of Flanders or in an area in the Holy Roman Empire that is now in the Netherlands, and lived near the end of the Middle Ages. The surname "Fabri" was probably a Latinization of a name like Smit, Smeets or perhaps Le Fèvre (all meaning "smith") (Wegman 1992, 192). Little is known about his life. Apart from an undated mention of his name in the records of the church of St Donatian, Bruges, he is known to have been a singer at the court of Holland at The Hague from 1395 until his death in May 1400 (Reaney 2001). Of the three singers known to have been at the court in this time period, he was the only one known to have had a university degree (Wegman 1992, 193). After his demise, several books of polyphonic music were bought from his estate by the Count of Holland for use in his chapel (Reaney 2001).

Of his compositions, only four complete pieces survive, all ballades. Two of these have French texts (Or se depart and N'ay je cause d’estre lies et joyeux) and are in the ars subtilior style, highly complex and mannered (Reaney 2001). Both are three-voice compositions, though there are two (incompatible) alternatives for the third voice in Or se depart—a triplum and a contratenor (Reaney 2001). The other two ballades are in Dutch (Eer ende lof heb d'aventuer and Een cleyn parabel), with a simpler syllabic style of setting (Reaney 2001). The Leiden manuscript in which all of Fabri's works are found also contains an incomplete ballade, Een cleyn parabel, the text of which describes a dilemma: the poet loves his lady and would like to marry her, but finds it difficult to accept her recently born child. This may be an autobiographical reference: Martinus Fabri had a son baptized in April 1396, and the godmother was Margaret of Cleves, Countess of Holland (Wegman 1992, 194).

== Recordings ==
- 2009 – En un gardin. Les quatre saisons de l'Ars Nova. Manuscrits de Stavelot, Mons, Utrecht, Leiden. Capilla Flamenca. MEW 0852. Contains a recording of "Eer ende lof" by Martinus Fabri.
- 2021 – Hollandse Fragmenten: Early Dutch Polyphony. Diskantores, Niels Berentsen. Muso MU042 . Contains three ballades by Martinus Fabri.

== Sources ==
- Reaney, Gilbert. 2001. "Fabri, Martinus". The New Grove Dictionary of Music and Musicians, second edition, edited by Stanley Sadie and John Tyrrell. London: Macmillan Publishers.
- Wegman, Rob C. 1992. "New Light on Secular Polyphony at the Court of Holland in the Early Fifteenth Century". Journal of the Royal Musical Association 117, no. 2:181–207.
