= Institute of Comparative Law =

Institute of Comparative Law may refer to:

- Institute of Comparative Law (McGill University), Montreal, Canada
- Paris Institute of Comparative Law, France
- Swiss Institute of Comparative Law, Switzerland

== See also ==
- Tilburg Institute of Comparative and Transnational Law, Netherlands
- Max Planck Institute for Comparative Public Law and International Law, Heidelberg, Germany
- Max Planck Institute for Comparative and International Private Law, Hamburg, Germany
