= Tilburg Institute of Comparative and Transnational Law =

The Tilburg Institute of Comparative and Transnational Law (TICOM) is a research institute at Tilburg University in the Netherlands. It conducts fundamental research in the fields of comparative law and transnational law and has a special focus on law as an international phenomenon.

The institute was founded in September 2008 by the comparatist Jan M. Smits (professor of European Private Law and Comparative Law) and Monica Claes (professor of Comparative Constitutional Law). It has attracted a body of highly accomplished and young researchers, many of whom graduated with distinction from Oxford University and other top universities.

Some of the institute's notable research projects include the European Research Council (ERC) funded European and National Constitutional Law project (eunacon), as well as National Resistance to the Europeanisation of Private Law - a project supported by the Hague Institute for the Internationalisation of Law (HiiL). TICOM also organises a regular seminar series that attracts renowned speakers, as well as an annual TICOM Roundtable.
