= Smeets =

Origin
- Language: Limburgish
- Meaning: smith's
- Region of origin: Limburg (encompassing Limburg (Belgium) and Limburg (Netherlands))

Other names
- Variant forms: Smit; Smits

Smeets is a Limburgian surname (or more broadly, Dutch surname) meaning smith (metal worker). The surname hails specifically from the Limburg region spanning parts of the Southern Netherlands and Eastern Belgium.

== People bearing the Smeets surname ==
- Axel Smeets (b. 1974), Belgian football defender and manager
- Bryan Smeets (b. 1992), Dutch football midfielder
- Felix Smeets (1904–1961), Dutch football striker
- Hubert Smeets (b. 1958), Dutchjournalist and historian
- Ionica Smeets (b. 1979), Dutch mathematician, science journalist, and TV presenter
- Jan Smeets (b. 1985), Dutch chess player
- Jorg Smeets (b. 1970), Dutch football midfielder
- Jorrit Smeets (b. 1995), Dutch football midfielder
- Joseph Smeets (b. 1959), Belgian racing cyclist
- Lucian Smeets (fl. 1900), Belgian stamp forger
- Mart Smeets (b. 1947), Dutch radio and television personality, writer and columnist
- Martine Smeets (b. 1990), Dutch handball player
- Minke Smeets (b. 1979), Dutch field hockey player, wife of Tjerk
- Pauline Smeets (b. 1959), Dutch Labour Party politician
- Robert Smeets (b. 1985), Australian tennis player
- Theo Smeets (b. 1964), Dutch jeweler
- Tjerk Smeets (b. 1980), Dutch baseball player, son of Mart Smeets, husband of Minke

== See also ==
- Smets, Dutch occupational surname with a different origin
