= Dutch name =

Dutch names consist of one or more given names and a surname. The given name is usually gender-specific.

== Given names ==
A Dutch child's birth and given name(s) must be officially registered by the parents within 3 days after birth. It is not uncommon to give a child several given names. Usually the first one is for daily use, often in a diminutive form. Traditionally, Catholics often chose Latinized names for their children, such as Catharina and Wilhelmus, while Protestants more commonly chose simple Dutch forms such as Trijntje and Willem. In both cases, names were often shortened for everyday use (Wilhelmus and Willem became Wim). In 2014 39% of Dutch children received one name, another 38% were given two names, 20% had three names, 2% got four names and only a few hundred children had five or more given names.

=== Dutch (Netherlands) naming law (given names) ===
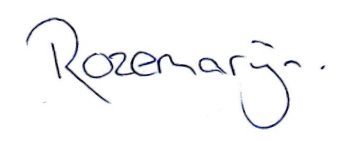
The Dutch girl's name Rozemarijn (Rosemary) in handwriting.

The Dutch naming legislation allows nearly all given names unless they are too similar to an existing surname, or if the name is inappropriate. There is no legal limit on the number of given names for one child.

=== History of Dutch given names ===
The history of Dutch given names can roughly be divided in four main periods:

1. The domination of Germanic names. (Migration Period and before until the High Middle Ages)
2. The high Middle Ages, when Germanic-based personal names lost ground to non-native holy names. (High Middle Ages until the Early Modern era)
3. A period of stability, when a very strong naming habit emerged. (Early Modern era–1960s)
4. The post-World War II period, characterised by previously unknown personal names. (1960s–present)

==== Germanic period ====
The Germanic names are the names with the longest history in the Dutch-speaking area; they form the oldest layer of the given names known in Dutch. The Germanic names were characterised by a rich diversity, as there were many possible combinations.

A Germanic name is composed of two parts, the latter of which also indicates the gender of the person. A name like Adelbert or Albert is composed of adel (meaning "noble") and bert which is derived from beracht (meaning "bright" or "shining"), hence the name means something in the order of "Bright/Shining through noble behaviour"; the English name Albright, now only seen as a surname, is a cognate with the same origin.

Combining these parts was used when the child was named after family or other relatives. For example, the child would receive two parts from different family members, in this way a father named Hildebrant and a mother called Gertrud might call their son Gerbrant and their daughter Hiltrud.

==== Medieval names ====
Through the course of the Middle Ages names derived from Christian Saints became more common than Germanic ones. From the 12th century onwards it became custom for the child to receive a Christian name, although some names of Germanic origin like Gertrude and Hubertus remained prevalent as these too became names of Christian saints.

The direct influence of the church on the transition from Germanic to Christian names must not be overestimated. Before the council of Trent (1545–1563), the Roman Catholic church did not have any regulation of the practice of naming children.

There are thought to have been a number of reasons the Christian names gained the upper hand, such as the Crusades, the larger ecclesiastical influence and the appearance of mendicant orders (such as the Franciscans and Dominicans) and most importantly, the veneration of saints and the appearance of patron saints.

Besides religious influence it is believed that fashion was the main reason to give children a Christian name. With larger cities starting to flourish all across the Low Countries, wealthy citizens in particular became trend-setters in this regard.

In these times typical Dutch names such as Kees (Cornelis), Jan (Johannes) and Piet (Petrus) emerged.

==== Stability ====
When the conversion was made from Germanic to Christian names, most parents just picked a name they liked best or would be most helpful in their child's later life, for example if the child came from a butcher's family and he himself could one day become a butcher, the child would probably be called after Sint Joris (the Dutch name for "Saint George"), the patron saint of the butchers.

The Dutch habit of naming newborns after another family member originates with a then-widespread superstition that the name in some way contributed to some form of reincarnation of the person the child was named after, who was usually much older. This superstition disappeared after some time, even though a certain Le Francq van Berkeij writes the following in 1776: bij veelen, een oud, overgeloovig denkbeeld, dat iemand weldra sterft, wanneer hij, gelijk men zegt, vernoemd is ("many have a superstitious belief that a person will soon die when someone, as they say, has been named after him").

As the centuries passed, this practice became so standard that the names of the children were practically known at the marriage of the future parents. The rules for naming were the following:

- First-born son is named after paternal grandfather
- First-born daughter is named after maternal grandmother
- Second son is named after maternal grandfather
- Second daughter is named after paternal grandmother
- Subsequent children were often named after uncles and aunts; there was some liberty of choice here.

The infant mortality rate was high. If a son had died before his next brother was born, this younger brother was usually given the same name. The same goes, mutatis mutandis, for a daughter. When the father died before the birth of a son, the son was usually named after him. When the mother died at the birth of a daughter, the daughter was usually named after the mother.

==== Post-World War II period (1945–present) ====
Traditionally there was little difference between the Christian name (doopnaam) and the name used in domestic spheres (roepnaam). If someone's Christian name was Johannes, domestically he was referred to as Johan, Jan or Hans.

After the war, the Dutch became less religious. Thus the Christian name and given name started to diverge, as personal names of foreign origin were adopted. In some cases these names are written more or less phonetically, for example Sjaak (French Jacques, English Jack) and Sjaan (French Jeanne). (See also Sjors & Sjimmie.) Working-class names Jan, Piet and Klaas (the Dutch proverbial equivalent to "Tom, Dick and Harry") were often replaced by middle-class Hans, Peter and Nico. Also, the urge to name children after their grandparents lessened dramatically. The change in naming also led to a new law on naming in 1970, replacing the old one, which had been in force since 1803.

Nowadays, traditional official names are found, but often only as an addition to the modern name. Boys are more often given a traditional Dutch name than girls. Boys are also more commonly named after a family member while girls are simply named for the sound of the name. As in the past there is a certain difference between working-class names and middle-class names, as the working class tend to adopt more modern names and names of celebrities and middle-class names are more traditional.

== Surnames ==
There is a great variety of Dutch surnames (over 100,000), partly because of an influx due to a forced official registration of surnames in 1811, hence there have been few generations in which names could become extinct. In practice, the great majority of Dutch people had family surnames for centuries, and the adoption of new names was limited to some Jewish citizens and some people in rural communities in the north east of the country.

There is a persistent myth that some Dutch citizens, as a way of protest, chose humorous names during the forced registration. Examples often given are Naaktgeboren ("born naked") or Zondervan ("without surname"). However these names are in fact far older; Naaktgeboren for example is from the German Nachgeboren (born after the father was deceased, also one of the origins of the name Posthumus).

Many Dutch surnames originated from different personal qualities, geographical locations, and occupations.

Many surnames include prefixes (tussenvoegsel) which come before the main part of the surname, such as de, ter and van. In the Netherlands these particles are usually ignored for collation purposes (i.e. in alphabetical lists). However, Dutch names in other countries (including Belgium) (e.g., in reference lists of scientific papers) may be ordered using the full name including all such prefixes (Van Rijn would be ordered under 'V'), partly because many Dutch emigrant families to English-speaking countries have had their prefixes capitalized for them, such as Martin Van Buren or Steve Van Dyck, and normal practice in English is to order on the first capitalized element.

The particle de is found as a prefix to many Dutch surnames, as in for instance de Wit, de Bruyn and de Kock; this is generally understood to mean "the" as in "the White", "the Brown" and "the Cook" in the examples. The particle van may be a calque of the French de, meaning "of" and was originally only taken by nobles; examples include Van Gent, Van Bern and Van den Haag, meaning "of Ghent", "of Berne" and "of the Hague", respectively.

=== Dutch naming law (surnames) ===
In line with Dutch tradition, marriage used to require a woman to precede her maiden name with her husband's name and add a hyphen between the two. Thus, when Anna Pietersen married Jan Jansen, she became Anna Jansen-Pietersen.

However, this did not become her legal name. Her legal name did not change at all. Passports, and other official documents, continued to name her Anna Pietersen, even though there might have been "spouse of Jan Jansen" added.

The current law in the Netherlands gives people more freedom: upon marriage within the Netherlands, both partners default to keeping their own surnames, but both are given the choice of using their partner's surname, or a combination of the two. For example, if a person called Jansen marries someone called Smit, each partner has the choice to call themselves Jansen, Smit, Jansen-Smit or Smit-Jansen. The preferred option will be registered with the municipal registration, without giving up the right to use one's original name, which remains the legal name. However, in practice, the standard procedure is that when a woman marries, she either keeps her maiden name or has a double surname. For example, if Miss Jansen marries Mr. Smit, she either chooses to become Mrs. Jansen or Mrs. Smit-Jansen or Mrs. Smit.

This can cause problems for foreign national females living in the country, as they may be required to present their passport as proof of identification. If they changed their surname on marriage, then in municipal records the surname as it appears on their passport takes precedence. While name changes due to marriages performed in the Netherlands cannot be processed, it is certainly possible in the Netherlands to process name changes due to marriages performed outside the Netherlands, provided certain conditions are met. These conditions are that the marriage must be registered abroad, the application for a name change abroad must be requested on the same date as the marriage date, the changed name must be recorded abroad on a certificate in accordance with the local rules of the foreign country and the marriage and name change, as well as proof of application as of the date of the marriage, must be legalized or apostilled and provided to the Dutch consulate or Dutch municipality upon return to the Netherlands.

This stems from the fact that international marriages are not necessarily governed by Dutch law but by private international law which is codified in the Netherlands in the Civil Code (Burgerlijk Wetboek), Book No. 10, Private International Law, Title 2 - The Name, Article 24.

Parents can choose to give their children either their father's or mother's family name, as long as the parents are married or are living together and the father has acknowledged the child. The surname of younger siblings must be the same as the surname of the oldest child.

=== Patronymics ===
Although most people had family surnames before 1811, the use of patronymics was common, including for those with established last names. The oldest form used the possessive of the father's name along with the word for son or daughter. Examples would be a boy born to Jan being named Pieter Janszoon while his daughter might be named Geertje Jansdochter. These forms were commonly shortened, to Janszn./Jansz and Jansdr., or to Jansse, and finally to Jans which could be used for both male or female children. These patronymic names were official and even used on legal documents where inheritances can be seen to pass from father to son with different "last names".

In the North and East of the Netherlands, between 1000 and 1800 AD many people were named after their ancestors, sometimes after the place where they lived, by the suffix ‑ma or ‑stra (of Frisian origin), or ‑ing or ‑ink (of Low Saxon origin). Examples: Dijkstra (after a dyke near the place they came from); Halbertsma (after an ancestor called Halbert); Wiebing (after an ancestor called Wiebe); Hesselink (after an ancestor called Hessel). After 1811, many patronymics became permanent surnames, so that Peeters, Jansen, Willems are common surnames today.

In the former Netherlands Antilles, such as Curaçao or Aruba, the use of female names as surnames is predominant (e.g. Martina, Gustina, Bonevacia, Benita). This could have many origins, for instance that the freed slaves without a known father adopted their mother's or grandmother's name as surname, or they took the father's name with the ‑a suffix like some Dutch last names (with ‑tsma or ‑inga suffixes).

Most common surnames (1947)
Netherlands	Belgium
1. De Jong	1. Peeters
2. De Vries	2. Janssens
3. Jansen	3. Maes
4. Van de/den/der Berg	4. Jacobs
5. Bakker	5. Mertens
6. Van Dijk	6. Willems
7. Visser	7. Claes
8. Janssen	8. Goossens
9. Smit	9. Wouters
10. Meijer/Meyer	10. De Smet

=== Most common Dutch surnames ===
The most common Dutch surnames in the Netherlands (as of 1947) and Flanders in Belgium are listed to the right. Meertens' Dutch surname database lists 94,143 different family names; the total Dutch speaking population in Europe is estimated to be about 23 million people. The most common Dutch names in Belgium are nearly all patronymic "father-based" names in which they are composed with the following formula name of father + "-son", the only exceptions being De Smet (the Smith) and - to a certain extent, because it is also a patronymic ("Thomas") - Maes (Meuse). The most common Dutch names in the Netherlands are more diverse, with names ranging from Visser (fisherman) to Van Dijk ((living near) the dike) and De Jong (the young (one)). It should be remembered however that these figures are based on the data of an entire country, and on a smaller scale other names tend to dominate certain regions.

=== Tussenvoegsels ===
Over 20,000 surnames in the Netherlands start with tussenvoegsels, consisting of prepositions and/or articles that have lost their original grammatical function and have transitioned to separable affixes. A large number of prepositions and combinations are possible (see List of family name affixes), but the vast majority of such names start with just a few: 99% of the people with tussenvoegsel-names (including foreign names with "von", "de la", "dos" etc.) have names starting with van ("from / of"; 45%), de / den ("the", 21.5% & 1.6%), van der / van den / van de / van 't ("from the" with different inflections; 16.6%, 7.2%, 4.3%, 0.5%), ten / ter ("at the"; 1.1%, 0.8%) and te ("at"; 0.4%).

In the Netherlands the tussenvoegsels are rarely capitalized, while in Belgium, since the 19th century, they usually are. In the Netherlands, as for example in Germany, Spain, Portugal and (considering prepositions) France, the tussenvoegsels are not a part of the indexing process, and in encyclopedias, telephone books, etc. surnames are sorted starting with the first capitalized noun. In Belgium, as in English speaking countries, South Africa, Italy and (considering articles) France, indexing includes the tussenvoegsels, leading to large sections under "D" and "V". In Belgium, primarily in West Flanders, prepositions and articles can be compounded with the surname (such as Vandecasteele) and a few combinations occur (Vande Casteele).

In the Netherlands, the first tussenvoegsel is capitalized, unless a given name, initial, title of nobility, or other family name (e.g., in the married name of women) precedes it. For example: Jan van den Berg, J. van den Berg, but Mijn naam is Van den Berg ("my name is Van den Berg") and de heer Van den Berg ("Mr. Van den Berg"). Herman baron van Voorst tot Voorst. Mrs. Jansen - van den Berg.

In Flanders, tussenvoegsels of personal names always keep their original orthography: "mevrouw Van der Velde", "Van der Velde, A.", and "Van den Broeke, Jan". In the Netherlands the first letter of the tussenvoegsel is written with lower case in the above four exceptional cases, whereas in Flanders it is written according to the entry for the person in the population register and on his official ID. This implies that in Belgium it is usually written with an upper case with the exception for names of nobility or the royalty; for those they are always in lower case, also in Belgium. See for an alternative discussion of the capitalization and collation issues around separable affixes in Dutch Van (Dutch).

The order of stating one's surname and given name also differs between the Netherlands and Flanders. In the Netherlands, the usual order is to state one's given name followed by one's surname, while in Flanders, one's surname is stated first. For example, in the Netherlands, one would say "John van der Vuurst", while in Flanders, it would be "van der Vuurst, John".

While in German surnames the addition of von before a geographical name often indicates that a person belongs to the nobility or royalty, van is too common in the Netherlands to make such a connection. This usage does exist in Flemish names, though the Flemish nobility usually obtained the French prefix 'de', specifically without capitalization.

Dutch nobles

Since the 11th century, high Dutch nobles have been adopting last names based on the name of the land they ruled. For example, if a Dutch nobleman was the Lord of a place called “Hoost”, he would be then known as ________ van Hoost. This would continue until the 13th century.
