= Rachid Bouaouzan =

Dutch-Moroccan retired footballer

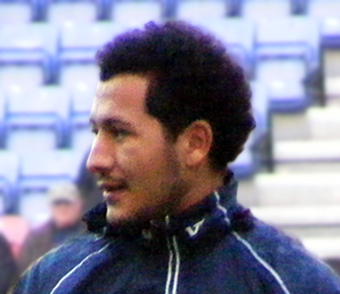
- Bouaouzan in 2010

Personal information
- Date of birth: 20 February 1984 (age 42)
- Place of birth: Rotterdam, Netherlands
- Height: 1.70 m (5 ft 7 in)
- Position: Winger

Youth career
- SVV/SMC
- Sparta Rotterdam

Senior career*
Years	Team	Apps	(Gls)
2003–2007	Sparta	71	(4)
2007–2010	Wigan Athletic	0	(0)
2008–2009	→ N.E.C. (loan)	24	(1)
2010	→ Helsingborg (loan)	5	(0)
2010–2013	Helsingborg	52	(4)
Total		152	(9)
- * Club domestic league appearances and goals

Rachid Bouaouzan (Dutch pronunciation: [rɑˈɕid buʋɑˈʋuzɑn]; born 20 February 1984) is a Dutch-Moroccan former professional footballer who played as a winger.

== Club career ==
=== Sparta Rotterdam and The Kokmeijer case ===
Born in Rotterdam to Moroccan parents, Bouaouzan started out his football at SVV/SMC before moving to Sparta Rotterdam, where he started his professional career. Bouaouzan made his debut in professional football, being part of the Sparta Rotterdam squad in the 2003–04 season. Following this, he extended his contract with the club.

In his second season, while playing in the Eerste Divisie, Bouaouzan reached the Dutch news headlines due to a heavy foul on Niels Kokmeijer, his opponent playing for Go Ahead Eagles on 17 December 2004. Kokmeijer's leg was broken so badly that he was subsequently forced to retire from professional football. Sparta Rotterdam suspended Bouaouzan for the rest of the season, which was more than the ten-match ban the KNVB awarded him. Besides that he was taken to court by the Dutch government for battery, a unique moment in Dutch football history. Bouaouzan was sentenced to a conditional six months in jail. In April 2008, the highest Dutch court confirmed this. Furthermore, this led him facing bankruptcy after the court ordered him to pay compensation to Kokmeijer. Bouaouzan later reflected on his action, saying that he never injured anyone consciously. But Kokmeijer later disputed Bouaouzan's claim, maintaining the fact that he attacked him. Sparta Rotterdam qualified for the play-offs where Bouaouzan returned on the pitch and in the last and final play-off match, he scored the club's winning goal over Helmond Sport, thus securing them a spot in the Eredivisie for 2005–06 season. At the end of the 2004–05 season, Bouaouzan went on to make ten appearances and scoring once in all competitions.

In the 2005–06 season, Bouaouzan's first appearance in Eredivisie came on 21 August 2005, starting the whole game, in a 3–1 loss against Feyenoord. He continued to establish himself in the first team, playing in the midfield position. His performance at Sparta Rotterdam prompted the club to negotiate a new contract with him. Despite this, he scored his first goal of the season on 25 February 2006, in a 3–2 win over Willem II. At the end of the 2005–06 season, making the total of twenty–nine appearances and scoring once in all competitions, his future was uncertain, as Bouaouzan was linked a move away from Sparta Rotterdam. Eventually, he ended the transfer speculation by signing a two–year contract with the club in May 2006.

In the 2006–07 season, Bouaouzan continued to establish himself in the first team, playing in the midfield position, but Sparta Rotterdam made a poor start to the season. Despite this, the club managed to regain overcome the results and he scored in a 3–0 win over Twente on 30 December 2006. Halfway through the season, the club was in talks with Bouaouzan over a contract that would keep him until 2010. Since the start of the 2006–07 season, he appeared in every league match until injuring his hamstring that kept him out for almost two months. On 16 February 2007, Bouaouzan made his return to the starting line–up against NAC Breda, coming on as a second-half substitute, in a 3–1 loss. However, his return was short–lived when he was absent for the next two matches, due to manager Wiljan Vloet decided to leave him out of the squad. Bouaouzan returned to the starting line–up against Vitesse on 6 April 2007, as Sparta Rotterdam lost 3–0. Two weeks later on 22 April 2007, he scored his second goal of the season, in a 5–2 loss against Ajax. At the end of the 2006–07 season, Bouaouzan went on to make a total of twenty–eight appearances and scoring two times in all competitions.

Ahead of the 2007–08 season, Bouaouzan was expected to be in the first team under the new management of Gert Aandewiel. However, he continued to be linked a move away from the club. Amid the transfer speculation, Bouaouzan appeared two times for Sparta Rotterdam at the start of the 2007–08 season. Weeks after his departure from the club, he was given a farewell send-off following the end of Sparta Rotterdam's match against AZ Alkmaar on 13 September 2007.

=== Wigan Athletic ===
On 30 August 2007, it was announced that Bouaouzan had signed a three-year contract with Wigan Athletic. The transfer fee was rumoured to be in the region of £300,000. It was revealed that he had been on the verge of moving to Feyenoord, having passed a medical before joining Wigan Athletic instead.

Although he had stated he did not see himself playing again in his second season at the club, Bouaouzan later made his first and only appearance for the club when he came on as a substitute in a League Cup tie with Notts County on 26 August 2008. After three years at Wigan Athletic, his contract with the club expired on 30 June 2010.

=== N.E.C. Nijmegen (loan) ===
Because Bouaouzan was not able to get into the Wigan squad during the 2007/08 season, he went on a one-year loan deal to the Dutch Eredivisie side N.E.C. on 29 August 2008 to gain first team experience.

Bouaouzan made his NEC Nijmegen debut on 13 September 2008, starting the whole game, in a 1–1 draw against Twente. Then, on 25 September 2008, he provided a hat–trick assists during the match, in a 5–0 win over Be Quick 1887. Following this, Bouaouzan continued to feature in the first team choice under the management of Mario Been despite facing injuries and disagreements along the way, as well as, being able to play in Nijmegen's UEFA Cup campaign. He then played against his former club, Sparta Rotterdam and won a penalty, leading Youssef El Akchaoui successfully convert the penalty kick, in a 2–0 win on 2 November 2008. After the match, Bouaouzan said the reception he received from his former club, Sparta Rotterdam, as “disappointing.” On 13 December 2008, Bouaouzan scored his first goal of the season, in a 3–1 win over Willem II. During the season, Bouaouzan was banned to the reserve squad three times for disciplinary reasons and motivational problems. In April 2009, after another incident, he was sent back to Wigan. Despite this, Bouaouzan went on to make a total of thirty–three appearances and scoring once in all competitions.

=== Helsingborgs IF ===
Having failed to play a single game on his return to Wigan, and so on 1 April 2010 Bouaouzan joined Swedish club Helsingborgs IF on loan for three months. After appearing as an unused substitute for three matches since joining the club, he made his Helsingborgs IF debut on 29 April 2010, coming on as a substitute, in a 1–0 win over AIK. Bouaouzan then set up one of the goals, in a 3–1 win over Gefle on 10 May 2010. He appeared five times for the side before suffering an injury that ended his loan spell at Helsingborgs IF.

On 23 September 2010, Bouaouzan re-joined Helsingborgs IF, initially signing a short-term deal with the club. Prior to his move, he went on trial at his former club, Sparta Rotterdam and Randers. Bouaouzan's first game after signing for the club on a permanent basis came on 27 September 2010, in a 3–2 win over AIK. He then set up a goal for the second time this season, in a 3–0 win over Åtvidaberg on 24 October 2010. Four days later on 28 October 2010, Bouaouzan played a role in the semi–finals of the Svenska Cupen against Mjällby when he set up two goals to win 2–0 to help a Helsingborgs IF advance to the next round. Bouaouzan started the whole game against Kalmar in the last game of the season, in a 0–0 draw but cost the club to win the league title, as title contender rival, Malmö FF, won the league following their win. Following this, he played in the final of Svenska Cupen against Hammarby and started a match before being substituted in the first half, as Helsingborgs IF won 1–0 to win the tournament. At the end of the 2010 season, making the total of thirteen appearances, Bouaouzan signed a three–year contract with the club, keeping him until 2013.

In the 2011 season, Bouaouzan started the season well, appearing in the first team, where Helsingborgs IF made a good start to the season, including a 2–1 win against Malmö FF in Svenska Supercupen. Since the start of the 2011 season, he continued to establish himself in the first team, playing in the midfield position. Throughout May, Bouaouzan played a role for the side when he set up four goals (two in the league and two in Svenska Cupen) against BK Häcken, Gefle, Landskrona and Trelleborg. During the month, Bouaouzan publicly criticised manager Conny Karlsson for his treatment of the player but he later apologised for the comment. After being sidelined an injury in late–June, Bouaouzan set up two goals in two matches between 18 July 2011 and 23 July 2011 against Kalmar and Malmö. However, his return was soon short–lived when he suffered a knee injury that kept him out for four weeks. On 21 September 2011, Bouaouzan made his return to the first team, coming on as a 76th-minute substitute, in a 3–2 loss against IF Elfsborg. Four days later on 25 September 2011, he scored his first goal of the season, in a 3–1 win over GAIS to help the club win the league for the first time since 1999. A month later, on 29 October 2011, Bouaouzan scored again in the semi-final of Svenska Cupen, in a 3–1 win over Örebro. In the final of Svenska Cupen, he then set up one of the goals, in a 3–1 win over Kalmar FF to win the Cup for the second time in a row, as well as, becoming the first team in Swedish history to win a treble, consisting of Super Cup, League and Swedish Cup titles. Despite being sidelined with further injuries during the 2011 season, Bouaouzan went on to make a total of twenty–five appearances and scoring two times in all competitions.

In the 2012 season, Bouaouzan started the season well when he scored twice in a 2–0 win over AIK in the Svenska Supercupen. Despite suffering from a knee injury in the pre–season tour, Bouaouzan, nevertheless, appeared in the first team despite competing with Daniel Nordmark. After suffering an injury in late–April, he made his return from injury on 2 May 2012, coming on as a substitute, in a 0–0 draw against AIK. Since returning from injury, Bouaouzan regained his first team place, playing in an attacking midfield role. On 12 August 2012, Bouaouzan scored his first goal of the season, in a 7–2 win over Kalmar FF. He then scored again on 28 October 2012, in a 3–1 win over GAIS. After being absent from the first team for a month, Bouaouzan returned to a match on 6 December 2012, and set up two goals in a 3–1 win over Twente. At the end of the 2012 season, he went on to make thirty–two appearances and scoring two times in all competitions.

Ahead of the 2013 season, Bouaouzan remained at the club despite the transfer speculation occurred earlier this year. However, he found himself on the substitute bench, with David Accam preferred to his position instead. Bouaouzan made his first appearance of the season on 15 April 2013, coming on as a late substitute, in a 2–1 loss against Mjällby AIF. He made another appearance before suffering a hip injury that kept him out for three months. After returning to training in September, Bouaouzan made his return from injury on 25 September 2013, in a 3–0 loss against Malmö FF. By the time of his departure, he made four appearances in all competitions.

Despite keen on staying at the club for another season, Bouaouzan, however, was dismissed by the club in October 2013 after another act of indiscipline. Upon learning his release, Bouaouzan said he was keen on playing for another Swedish club. Following this, Bouaouzan went on trial at Sparta Rotterdam, but it was unsuccessful.

== International career ==
Bouaouzan joined the Morocco national team in their preparation in October 2006 in the Netherlands. Earlier this year, he was called up to the Netherlands U21 but didn't make his debut for the U21 national team. Despite not getting call–up, Bouaouzan said: "So for me, Morocco is my home country. In fact, I think Morocco will go all the way this time and win the championship."

== Personal life ==
After his playing time came to an end, Bouaouzan made Netherlands media headlines when he was arrested and detained for drug and money laundering.

== Honours ==
Helsingborgs IF

- Allsvenskan: 2011
- Svenska Cupen: 2010, 2011
- Svenska Supercupen: 2011, 2012
