= Niels Kokmeijer =

Dutch former professional footballer (born 1977)

Personal information
- Date of birth: 30 December 1977 (age 48)
- Place of birth: Uitgeest, Netherlands
- Height: 1.83 m (6 ft 0 in)
- Position: Forward

Senior career*
Years	Team	Apps	(Gls)
1998–2001	Volendam	56	(19)
2001–2003	Heerenveen	0	(0)
2003–2004	Haarlem	27	(4)
2004	Go Ahead Eagles	14	(4)
Total		97	(27)
- * Club domestic league appearances and goals

Niels Kokmeijer (born 30 December 1977) is a Dutch former professional footballer who played as a forward. He later managed the Netherlands national beach soccer team.

== Career ==
Kokmeijer, born in Uitgeest, North Holland, played as a forward, making his professional debut as part of the FC Volendam squad in the 1998–99 season. He also played for SC Heerenveen and HFC Haarlem before joining Go Ahead Eagles in 2004–05, playing in the Eerste Divisie.

=== Injury ===
In his first and only season at Go Ahead, Kokmeijer was seriously injured by opponent Rachid Bouaouzan playing for Sparta Rotterdam on 17 December 2004. Kokmeijer's leg was broken so badly that he had to retire from professional football. Sparta Rotterdam suspended Bouaouzan for the rest of the season, which was more than the ten-match ban the KNVB awarded him. He was also prosecuted by the Dutch government and Kokmeijer for battery, unique in Dutch football history. Bouaouzan received a suspended six-month jail sentence.

=== Later career ===
From 2007 to 2014 Kokmeijer was manager of the Netherlands national beach soccer team, who became silver medalists in the 2008 Euro Beach Soccer League. He later did a number of projects for the Johan Cruyff Foundation and the Johan Cruyff Institute.

== Career statistics ==
Appearances and goals by club, season and competition
Club	Season	League		
Club	Season	Division	Apps	Goals
FC Volendam	1998–99	Eerste Divisie	4	2
FC Volendam	1999–2000	Eerste Divisie	30	7
FC Volendam	2000–01	Eerste Divisie	22	10
FC Volendam	Total		56	19
SC Heerenveen	2001–02	Eredivisie	0	0
SC Heerenveen	2002–03	Eredivisie	0	0
SC Heerenveen	Total		0	0
HFC Haarlem	2003–04	Eerste Divisie	27	4
Go Ahead Eagles	2004–05	Eerste Divisie	14	4
Career total			97	27
