= New Biological Nomenclature =

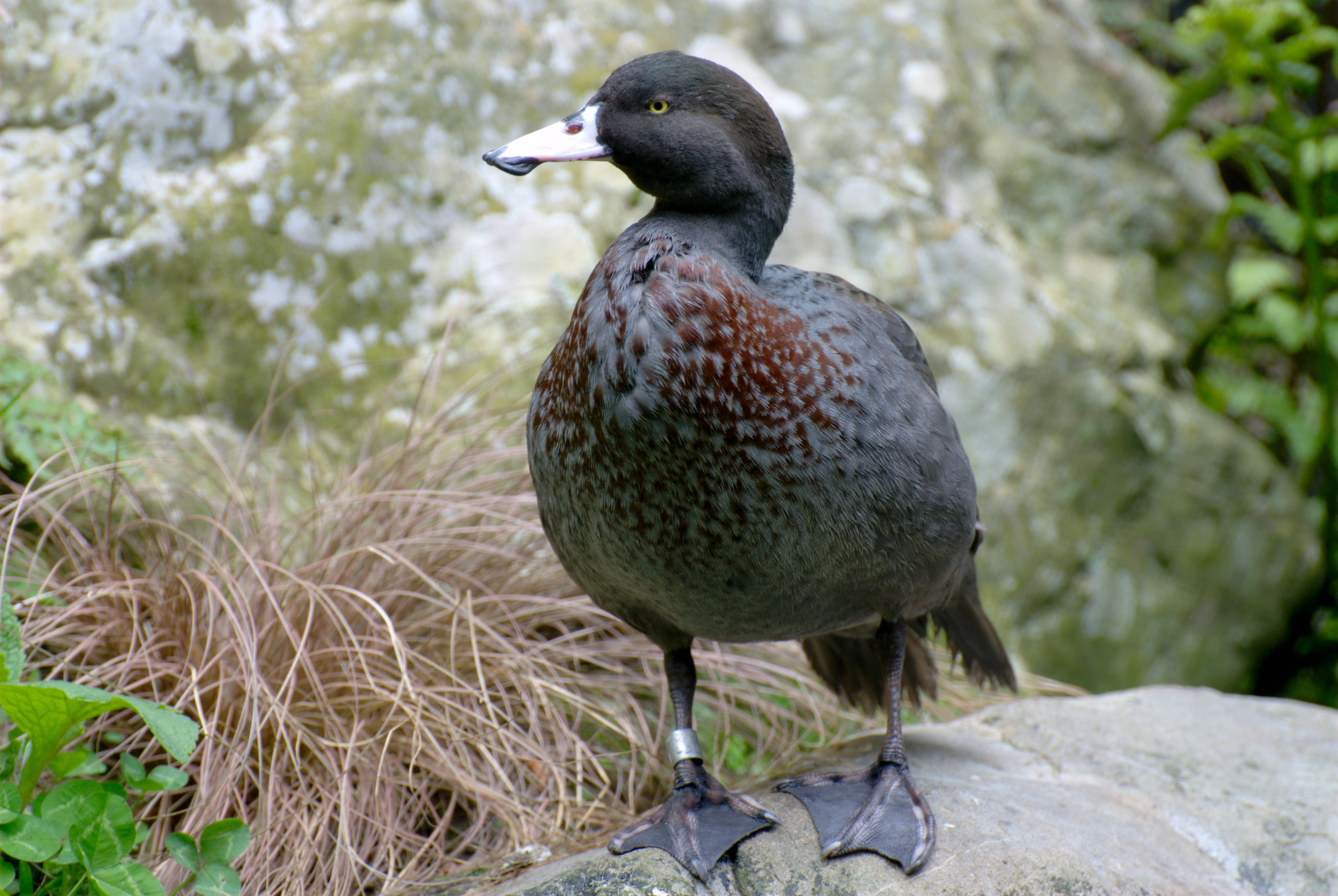
This bird with the difficult scientific name Hymenolaimus malacorhynchos is called *Anaso obtuzbeka* ("duck with obtuse beak") in N.B.N., family *Anasoj* ("j" gives plural; Anatidae).

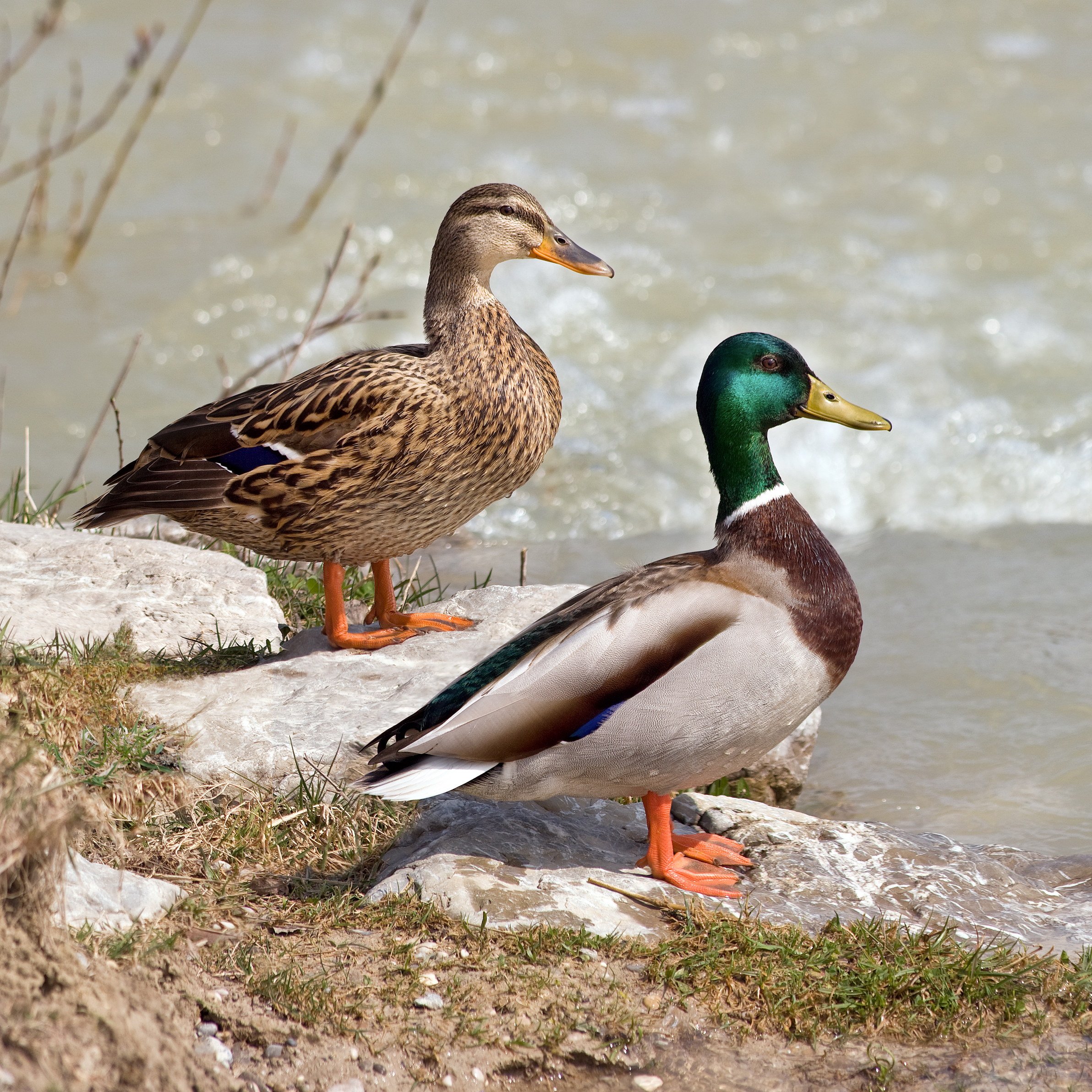
Anas platyrhynchos is the N.B.N. type for its order and is named *Anaso ordotipa* (i.e., "duck typical for its order"). The corresponding N.B.N. name of the order is *Anasordanoj* (i.e., "order in which ducks are members"; Anseriformes).

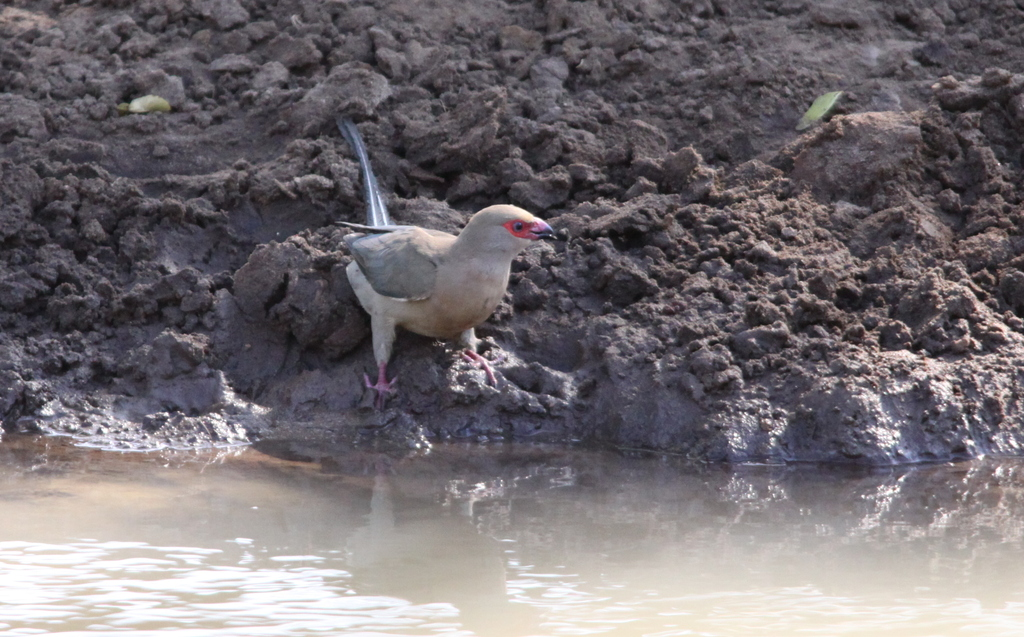
Urocolius indicus is a bird that only lives in the south of the Afrotropical realm, and does not occur in India. An example for the survival of misleading names in traditional nomenclature.

New Biological Nomenclature (N.B.N.) is a system for naming the species and other taxa of animals, plants etc. in a way that differs from the traditional nomenclatures of the past, as defined by its founder Wim De Smet, a Flemish zoologist. This project arose and developed between 1970 and 2005 (approximately), which coincided with the existence of a supporting organization, the Association for the Introduction of New Biological Nomenclature (AINBN). The system rests on 57 plainly formulated rules and uses terms from the language Esperanto, sometimes with the addition of neologisms with an Esperanto structure. However, N.B.N. does not simply involve translation into Esperanto of names of animals and plants. It is an entirely new scientific system, intended to give rational names to all taxa of the biota. After 1994 a formula consisting of letters and numerals was added to each N.B.N. name. This improves the possibilities for efficient (computer) use of the system.

Even though the project has stalled for several years, 3000 N.B.N. names, which are approved by the AINBN, are available and it would be possible to continue the project. The sample contains many of the higher taxa of zoology. So far, only a small effort has been made for botany. This is due to the fact that most of the participants were zoologists.

For comparison, in the famous Systema naturae of 1758, only 4238 species of animals were described.

== Advantages ==
According to the initiator, the following advantages are linked to N.B.N.:

1. A posteriori system: N.B.N. draws from the experiences of more than 200 years of scientific nomenclature, conserves from it the good sides and avoids the bad ones; N.B.N. makes use of modern views in biology and of the large knowledge of species and taxonomy.
2. Well defined system: the rules of the game were firm before any names were given.
3. Reliable system: the names do not originate only from one person; they are systematically criticized and (dis)approved by three other biologists.
4. Memorizable system: the names consist of understandable common words (in accordance with the case, one, two or three words).
5. Regular system: fixed endings for taxa of the same level.
6. Orienting system: each N.B.N. name has a link (by way of a key word) with the name of the corresponding order to which it belongs. (In the Kingdom of Animalia there are roughly 375 orders, of which about 200 may be known to a specialized biologist, but only about 100 by an average biologist or interested nature hobbyist; thus, a number of terms that is under control of memory).
7. Unifying system: the same rules apply for taxa of animals, plants, bacteria, among others.
8. Simple pronunciation, as in Esperanto.
9. Limitation of the number of words used by frequent reuse (for example, familitipa, ordotipa...)
10. New and rational selection of the type for taxa, where the best known species are chosen again and again.
11. New perspectives for musea, if they wish to conserve N.B.N. specimens for all species of definite families or higher taxa.
12. A N.B.N. name is easily recognizable in a text: for that purpose asterisks are used, or other means as necessary.
13. Handy for computer applications, among others, because of the limited vocabulary used.

== Continuation of tradition ==
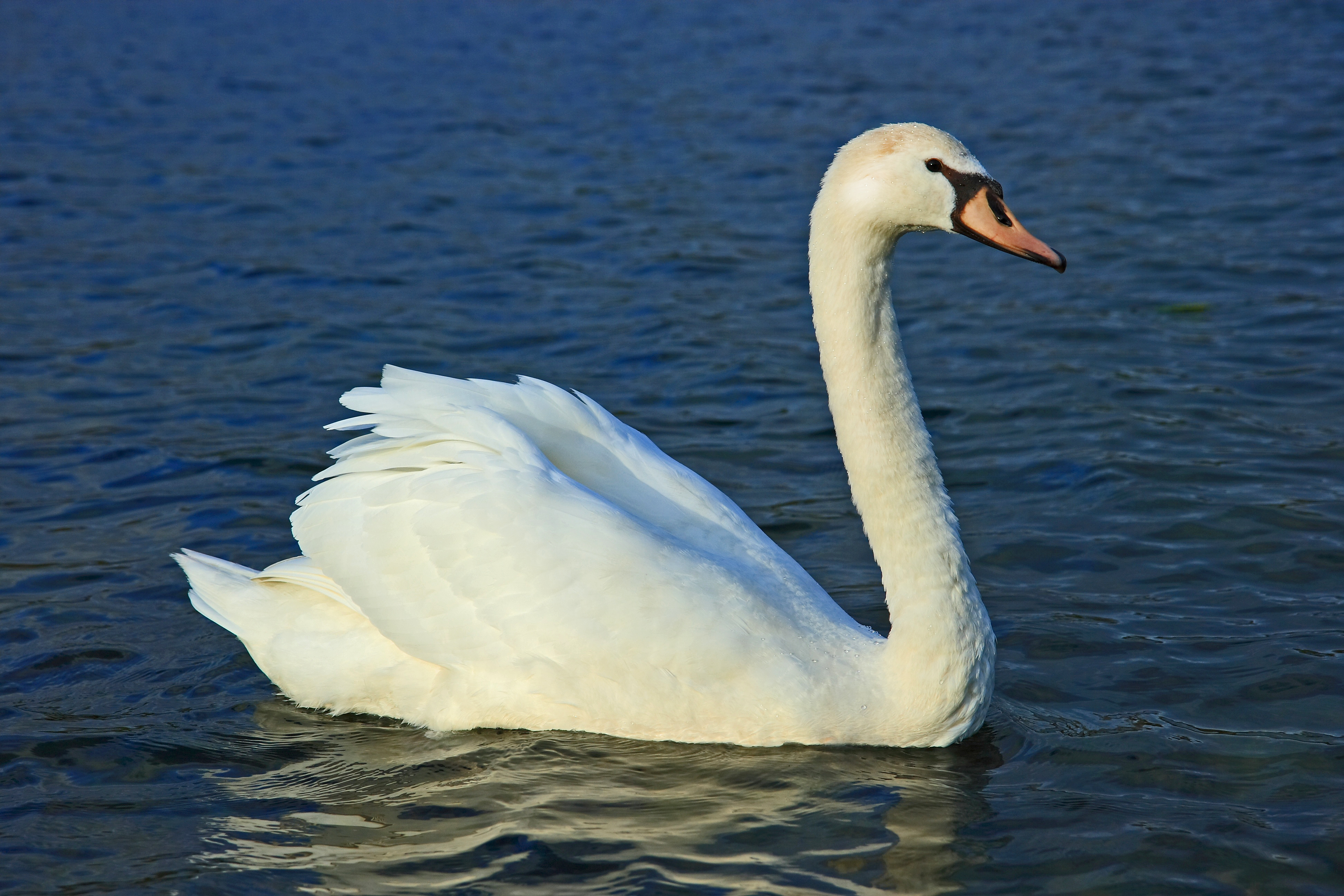
In the N.B.N.-system Cygnus olor becomes *Anaso olornoma* ("duck with name olor"), an "anaso" like all members of the family *Anasoj*.

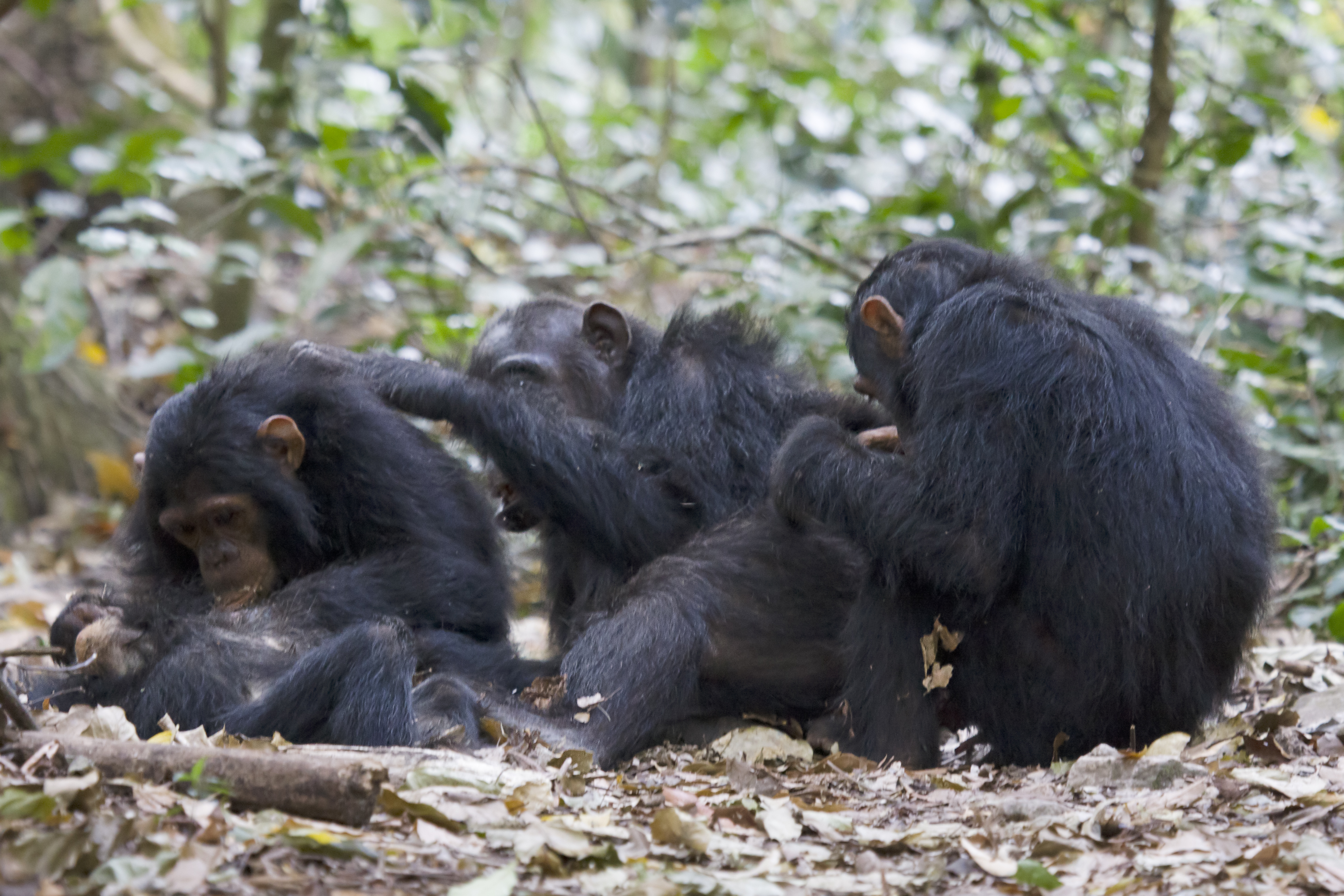
The N.B.N. name of the chimpanzee is *Lertantropo familitipa*. The scientific name Pan troglodytes represents the animal as a cave-dwelling Pan, while it lives in the African rain forest.

N.B.N. keeps features that are considered to be excellent, for example:

N.B.N. names consist of one, two or three words: (a) for indication of species two words are used; the first refers to a higher taxon; the second to the species itself; (b) when a name consists of three words then it relates to a subspecies; names of one word indicate taxa of levels higher than species.

Nothing is changed as to the traditionally admitted taxonomical structure (with the exception of the omission of the genus). N.B.N. assumes that the purpose of nomenclature is to give suitable and correct names to taxa, and not to establish phylogenetic links. "It was felt useful to classify the existing N.B.N.-names logically, independent of the phylogenetic classification of present biology, but in conformity with Linnaeus' original method, which generally began with the best known taxa and passed on the lesser known ones.".

== Specific N.B.N. arrangements ==
All arrangements are the same for plants and for animals, and in the future for other Kingdoms too. The first word of the name of a species always ends with "o" (in Esperanto a substantive). The second word always ends with "a" (in Esperanto an adjective). This first word is always the same for all species that belong to a family. The name of the N.B.N family is obtained by adding "j" (which is a plural in Esperanto) to the named substantive. For subspecies a third adjective is added. Where possible, the adjectives that define species and subspecies should render an informative, correct and exclusive characteristic. If not, it should be clear from the given name. There are five possibilities for the adjective that defines the species: (a) a word ending with "tipa" (typical for) for only one species of the family; (b) a word that expresses a characteristic of the species; (c) a word ending with "noma" (with name...), which refers to the scientific name; (d) an expression of the geographical range of the species, so far as the area is unique and possible to correctly describe; (e) a word without sense, ending with "ea" and originating from a definite list. This last possibility is only applied when no other solution is found.

N.B.N. names consisting of one word have fixed endings corresponding to the taxa. For kingdoms (regno), phyla (filumo), classes (klaso), orders (ordo) and suborders (subordo), families (familio) the endings are respectively "-regnanoj", "-filumanoj", "-klasanoj", "-ordanoj" and simply "-oj". The insertion "an" means "member of" and derives from the Esperanto ano, member.

In N.B.N. the name of the genus does not appear. All members of a family have a same "family name". This, properly speaking, means a return to the situation from the time of Linnaeus, where the genus played a role that is currently filled by the family designation. Family is a taxon that was inserted in the 19th century. The possible loss of information is counterbalanced by the adding of a numerical code that is linked to each species name and easily found with help of the today's usual technical means. The elimination of the genus name means an enormous saving in the number of nomenclature terms since nowadays more than 300,000 genera exist, only considering the animal kingdom.

Every taxon from the family is linked to a type species that determines the name of this taxon, together with the ending mentioned above.

The perhaps most characteristic quality of N.B.N. consists in the central place of the order and in the use of a key word that is found in each taxon that belongs to a definite order. For example, in the order of *Fokordanoj* (Pinnipedia) there is the key word "foko", which is present in all names of all families and all species of the order.

Examples of species and families of the order of the *Fokordanoj* (Pinnipedia; pinniped)
N.B.N. species name	Scientific name	English	N.B.N. family	Scientific family name	English
*Foko ordotipa*	Phoca vitulina	harbor seal	*Fokoj*	Phocidae	earless seal
*Foko krudhara*	Pusa hispida (Phoca hispida)	ringed seal	*Fokoj*		
*Foko bajkala*	Pusa sibirica (Phoca sibirica)	Baikal seal	*Fokoj*		
*Foko kaspia*	Pusa caspica (Phoca caspica)	Caspian seal	*Fokoj*		
*Orelfoko familitipa*	Zalophus californianus	California sea lion	*Orelfokoj*	Otariidae	sea lion
*Orelfoko otarionoma*	Otaria flavescens	South American sea lion	*Orelfokoj*		
*Orelfoko obtuzmuzela*	Eumetopias jubatus	Steller sea lion	*Orelfokoj*		
*Orelfoko vertstria*	Neophoca cinerea	Australian sea lion	*Orelfokoj*		
*Orelfoko fokarktosnoma*	Phocarctos hookeri (Neophoca hookeri)	New Zealand sea lion	*Orelfokoj*		
*Orelfoko robinoma*	Arctocephalus pusillus	Brown fur seal	*Orelfokoj*		
*Orelfoko rufflipera*	Arctocephalus australis	South American fur seal	*Orelfokoj*		
*Orelfoko flavbrusta*	Arctocephalus gazella	Antarctic fur seal	*Orelfokoj*		
*Tuskofoko familitipa*	Odobenus rosmarus	walrus	*Tuskofokoj*	Odobenidae	walruses

In contrast with traditional nomenclature there is no use in N.B.N. names of the names of authors, nor of the year of publication. The Principle of Priority does not exist with N.B.N. The N.B.N. names and rules are not unchangeable, but adaptations on personal initiative are not admitted; suggestions for changes have to be thoroughly motivated and submitted to the organizing body. If necessary adaptations occur, these are to be published without delay.
