= Uitgeest =

- Municipality
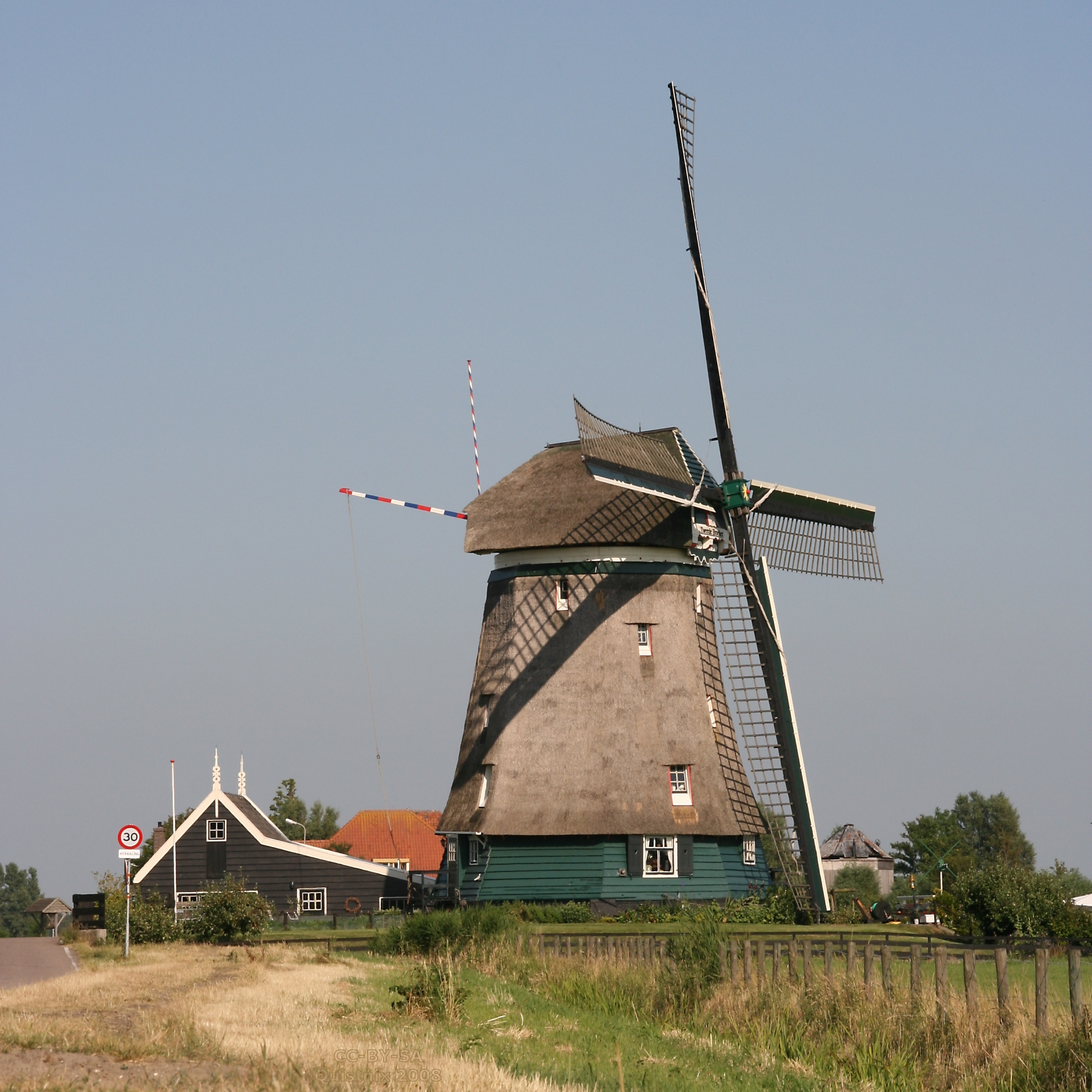
- Windmill Tweede Broekermolen in Uitgeest

- Flag Coat of arms

- Location in North Holland
- Coordinates: 52°32′N 4°43′E
- Country: Netherlands
- Province: North Holland

Government
  - Body: Municipal council
  - Mayor: Sebastiaan Nieuwland (D66)

Area
  - Total: 22.29 km^{2} (8.61 sq mi)
  - Land: 19.16 km^{2} (7.40 sq mi)
  - Water: 3.13 km^{2} (1.21 sq mi)
- Elevation: 1 m (3.3 ft)

Population (January 2021)
  - Total: 13,632
  - Density: 711/km^{2} (1,840/sq mi)
- Time zone: UTC+1 (CET)
  - Summer (DST): UTC+2 (CEST)
- Postcode: 1910–1911
- Area code: 0251
- Website: www.uitgeest.nl

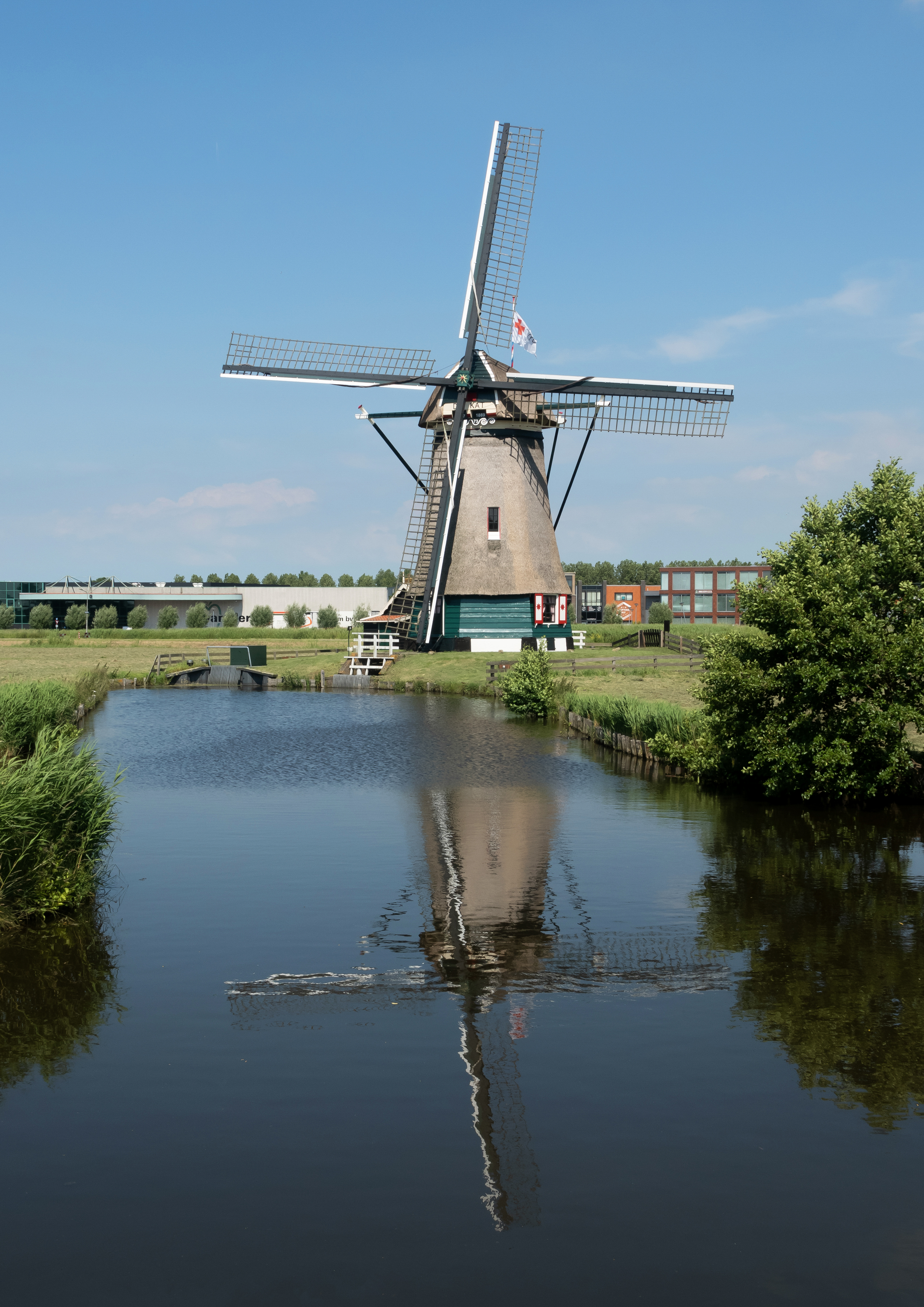
Windmill: windmolen De Kat

Uitgeest (Dutch pronunciation: [œytˈxeːst]) is a municipality and a town in the Netherlands, in the province of North Holland.

== Population centres ==
The municipality of Uitgeest consists of the following towns, villages and districts:

- Assum
- Busch en Dam
- Groot Dorregeest
- Uitgeest
- Kleis
- Waldijk

=== Topography ===
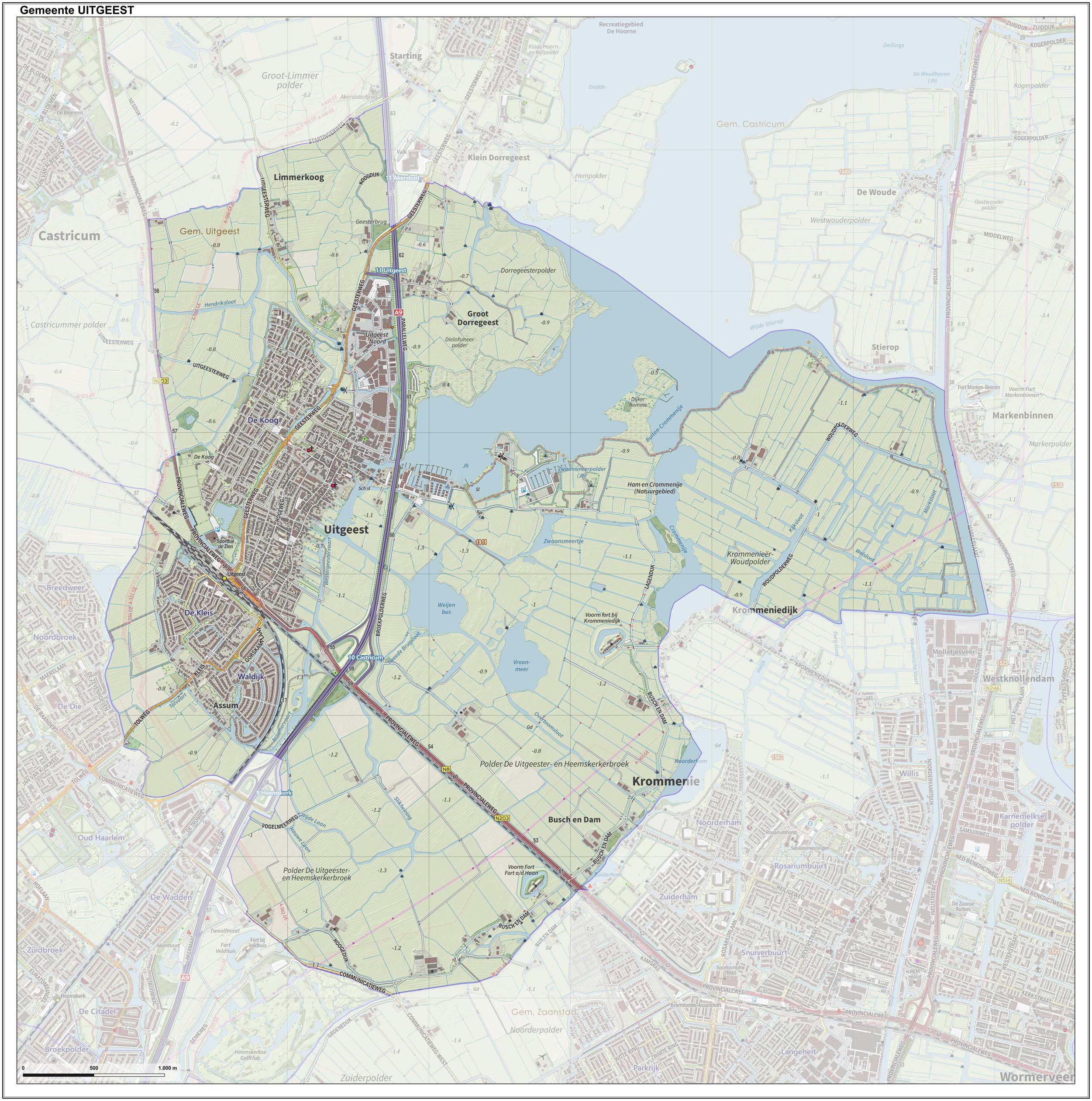
Map of the municipality of Uitgeest, June 2015

== Local government ==
The municipal council of Uitgeest consists of 15 seats, which at the 2026 municipal elections divided as follows:

- Independent Uitgeest - 3 seats
- Progressief Uitgeest - 3 seats
- D66 - 3 seats
- CDA - 2 seats
- VVD - 2 seats
- GroenLinks/PvdA - 1 seat
- Uitgeest Lokaal (UL) -1 seat

== Tourist information ==
No fewer than five windmills can be seen in the polder landscape surrounding the village. Uitgeest was the birthplace (in 1550) of Cornelis Corneliszoon, inventor of the wind-powered sawmill. An industrial heritage park, centered on sawmill De Hoop, is under construction.

The village has a Reformed church dating back to the early 14th Century and lakeside marina. The 670m outdoor kart-racing track made room for new housing, so this tourist attraction was lost. Fort along Den Ham (between Uitgeest and Krommenie) was one of the 42 forts of the Stelling van Amsterdam, a 19th-century ring of fortifications around Amsterdam which has been designated as a UNESCO World Heritage Site. The fort is now a museum open to the public on Sundays.

== Transportation ==
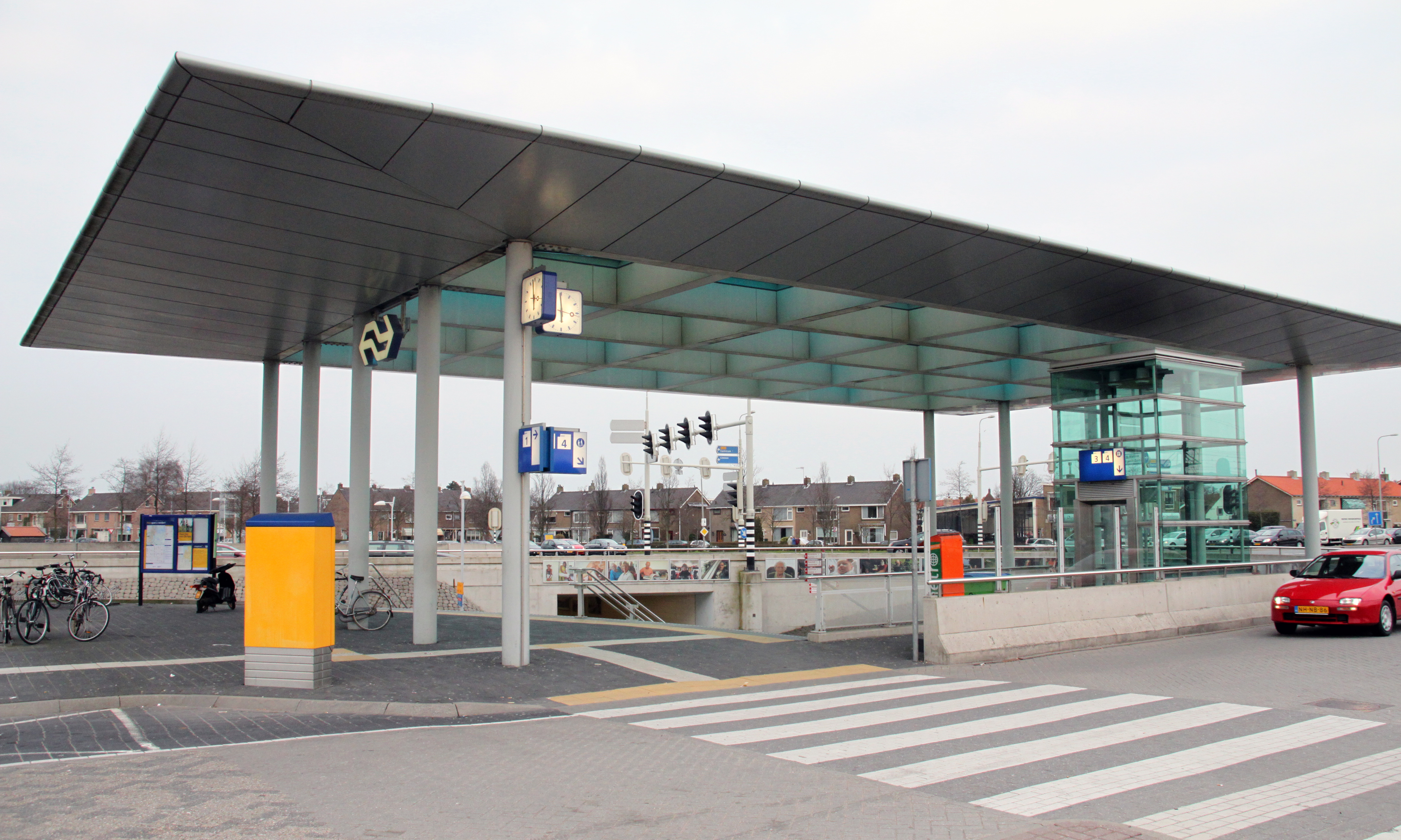
Uitgeest Station

- Railway station: Uitgeest

Uitgeest is served by 4 trains per hour (Monday – Saturday), journey time to Amsterdam is around 20 minutes. The Stoptrein via Beverwijk and Haarlem is slower, while the journey via Zaandam passes through scenic countryside.

- Highway

Uitgeest is very close to the highways N8/A8 and A9, with a travel time to Amsterdam of around 15 minutes. In 2010 two lanes ('spitsstroken') were added to the A9, improving the traffic to and from the Amsterdam region.

== Notable residents ==
- Cornelis Corneliszoon van Uitgeest (ca.1550–ca.1600) a windmill owner who invented the wind-powered sawmill
- Willem Blaeu (1571–1638) a cartographer, atlas maker and publisher
- Hessel Gerritsz (ca.1581–1632) an engraver, cartographer and publisher
- Jaap Knol (1896–1975) a Dutch javelin thrower, competed at the 1928 Summer Olympics
- Femke Liefting (born 2005) football goalkeeper
- Peter Smit (born 1952) children's writer
- Niels Kokmeijer (born 1977) a former Dutch footballer with almost 100 club caps, later manager of the Netherlands national beach soccer team
- Thijs Sluijter (born 1980) a retired Dutch footballer with over 300 club caps
- Wessel Nijman (born 2000) darts player
- Niels Zonneveld (born 1998) darts player

== Gallery ==
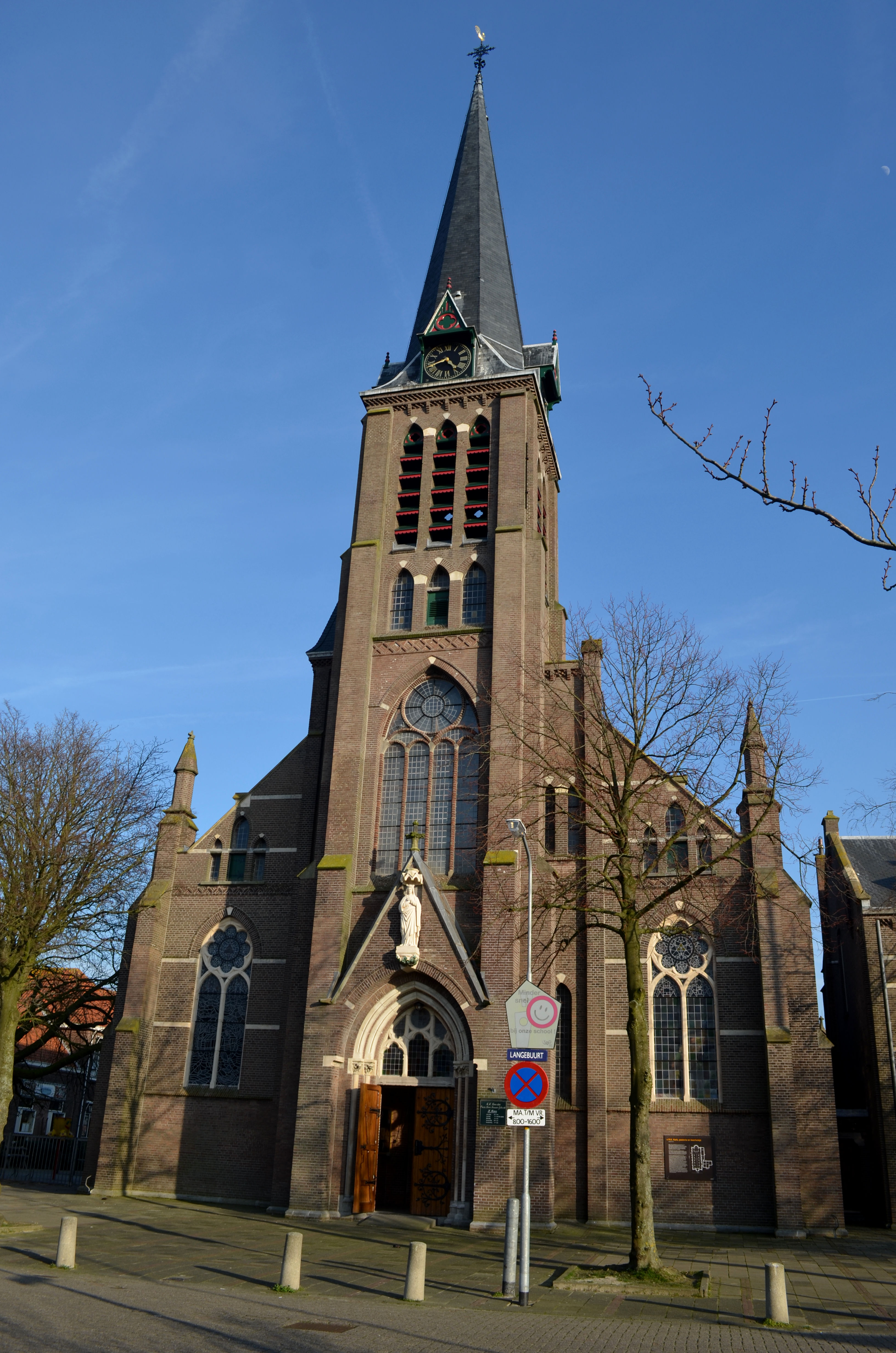
Neo-Gothic church, Uitgeest

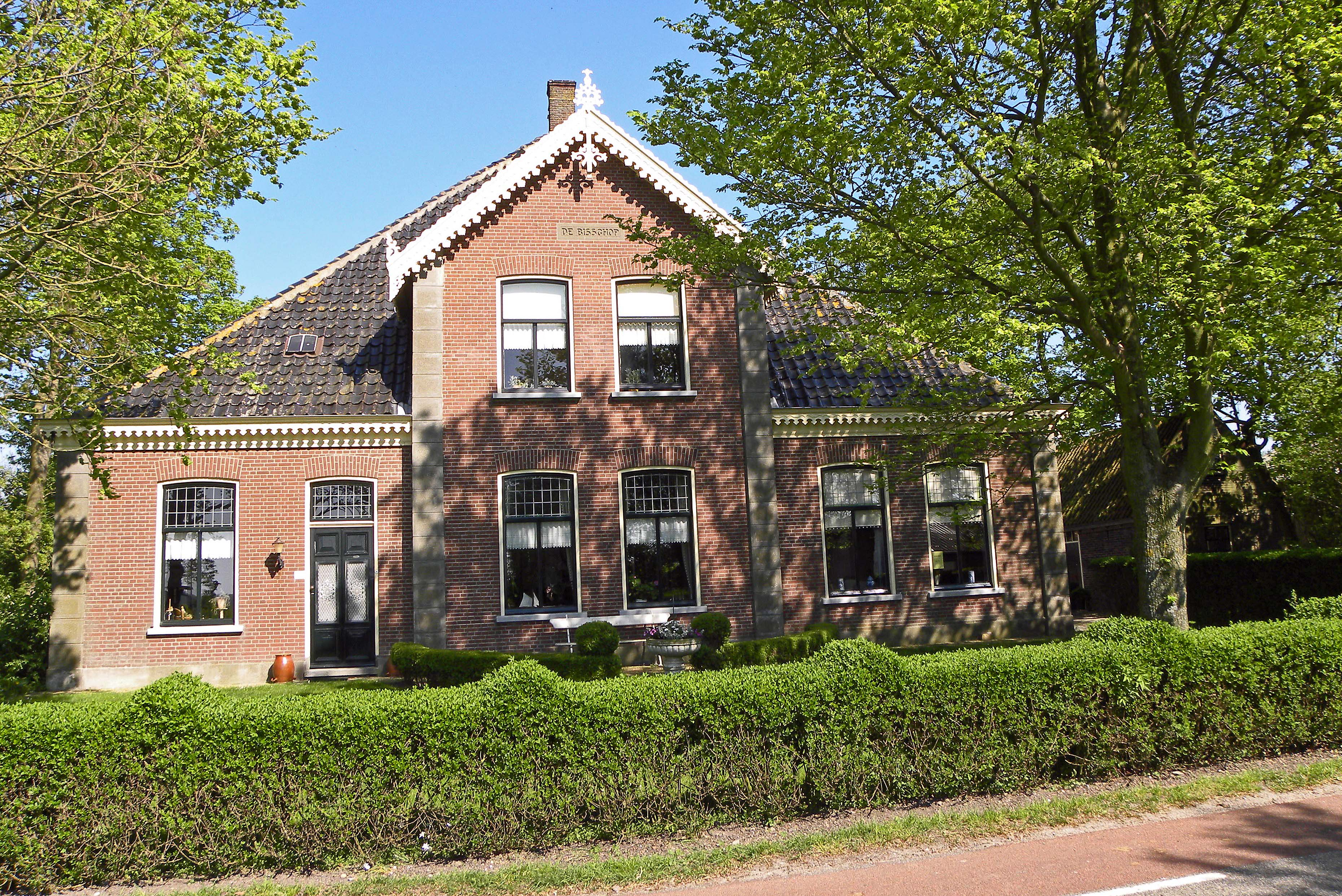
Uitgeesterweg, De Bisschop Stolpboerderij

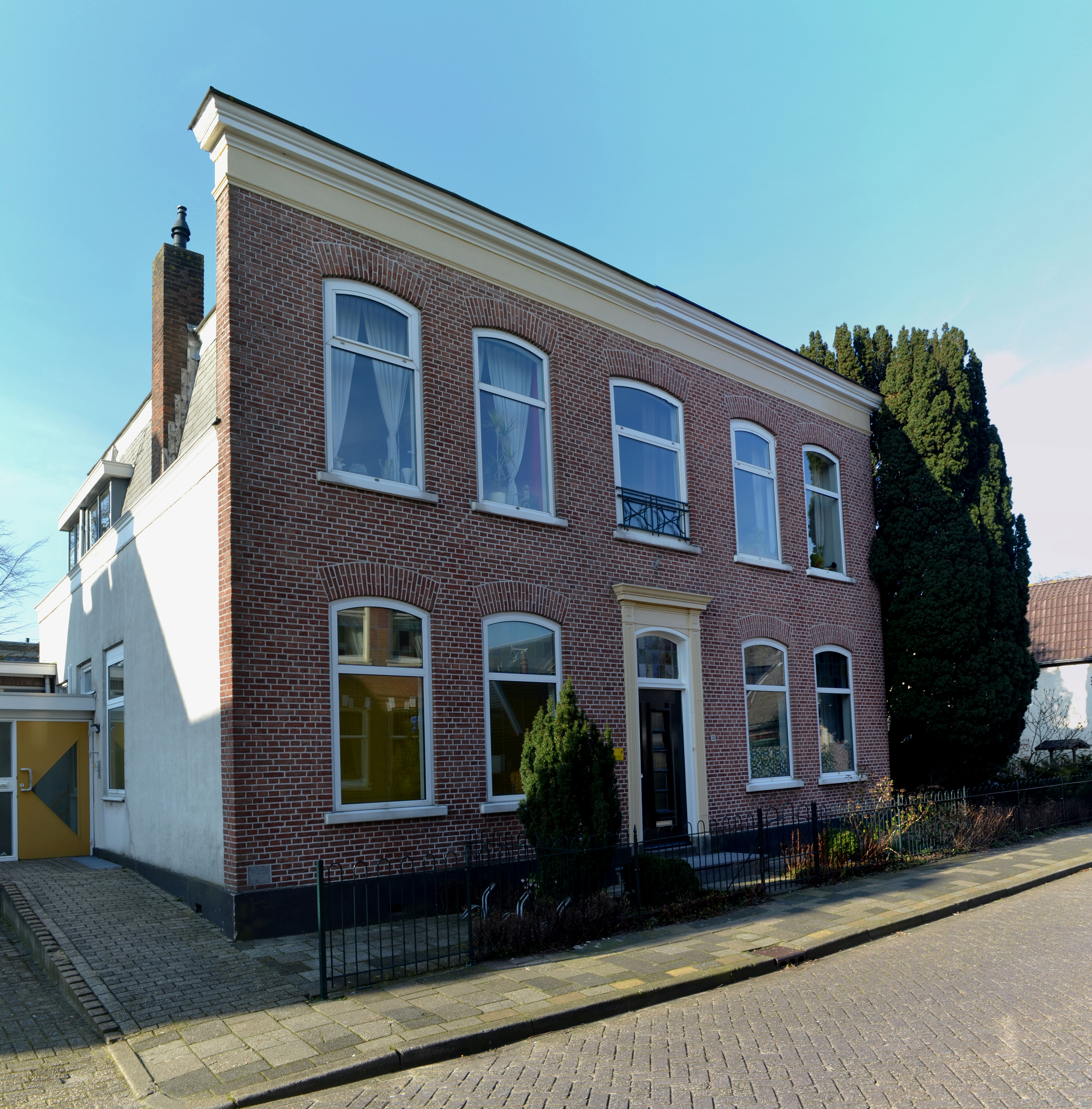
Artsenwoning, Middelweg, Uitgeest

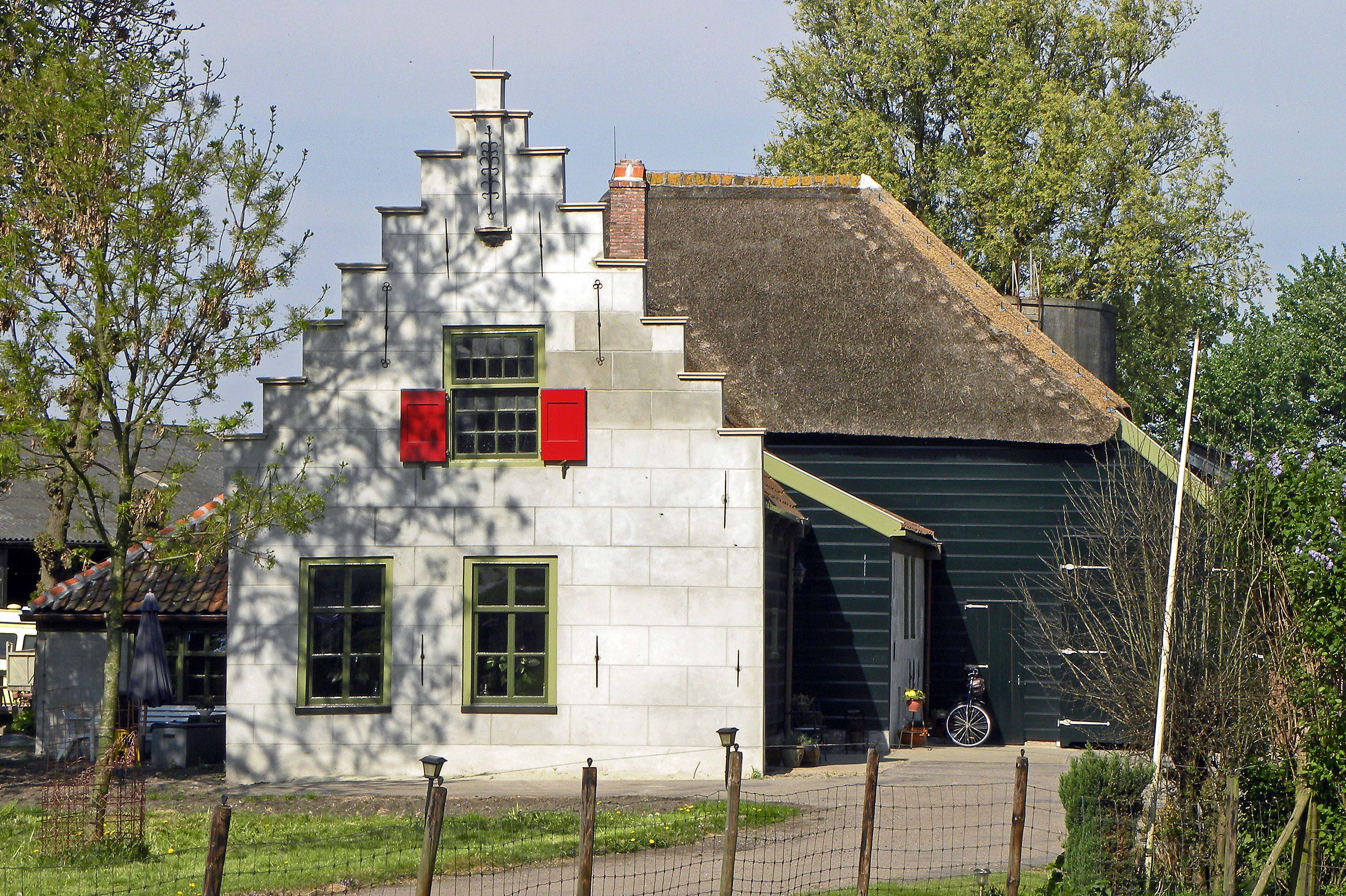
Provincialeweg 3 Kooghuis Farm

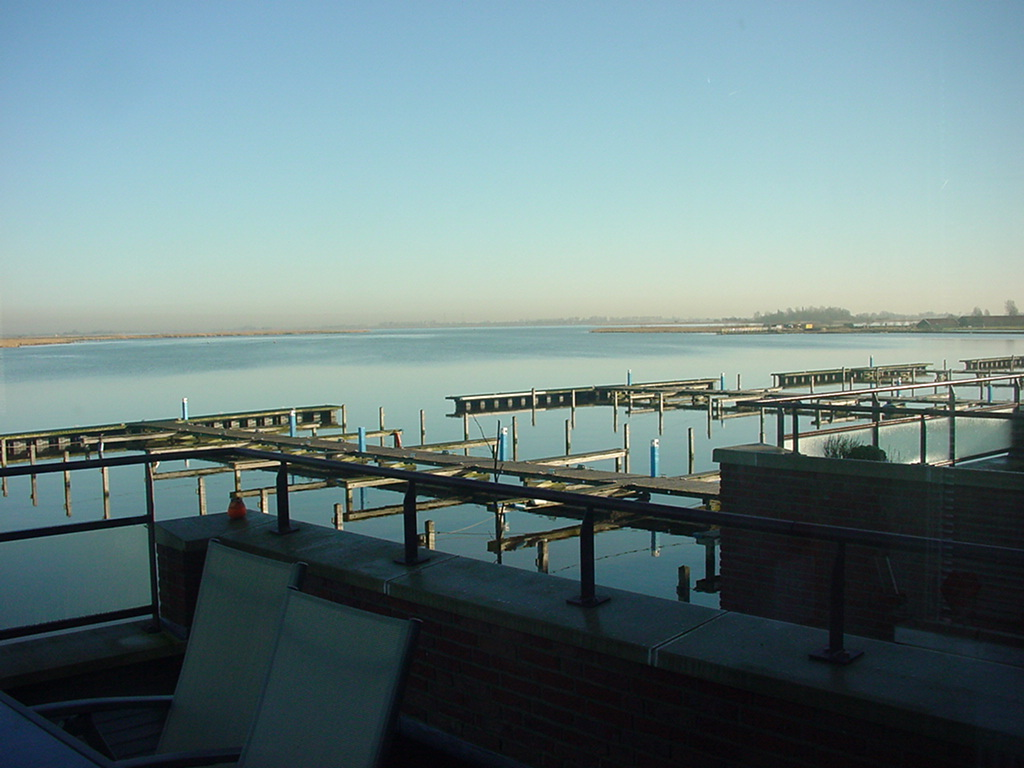
Uitgeest - panoramio
