= De Smet =

De Smet or Desmet may refer to:

== People ==
- De Smet (surname)

== Places ==
- De Smet, South Dakota, a town in Kingsbury County, South Dakota, United States
- De Smet, Idaho, a town in Benewah County, Idaho, United States
- De Smet, an unincorporated community in Missoula County, Montana, United States
- Smethport, PA, the county seat of McKean County, Pennsylvania, United States

== Other uses ==
- Desmet method, a method for restoring the colours of early silent films
- De Smet Jesuit High School, Creve Coeur, Missouri, United States
- DeSmet (boat), a passenger boat in Glacier National Park
