= Cornelis Corneliszoon van Uitgeest =

Dutch windmill owner and inventor

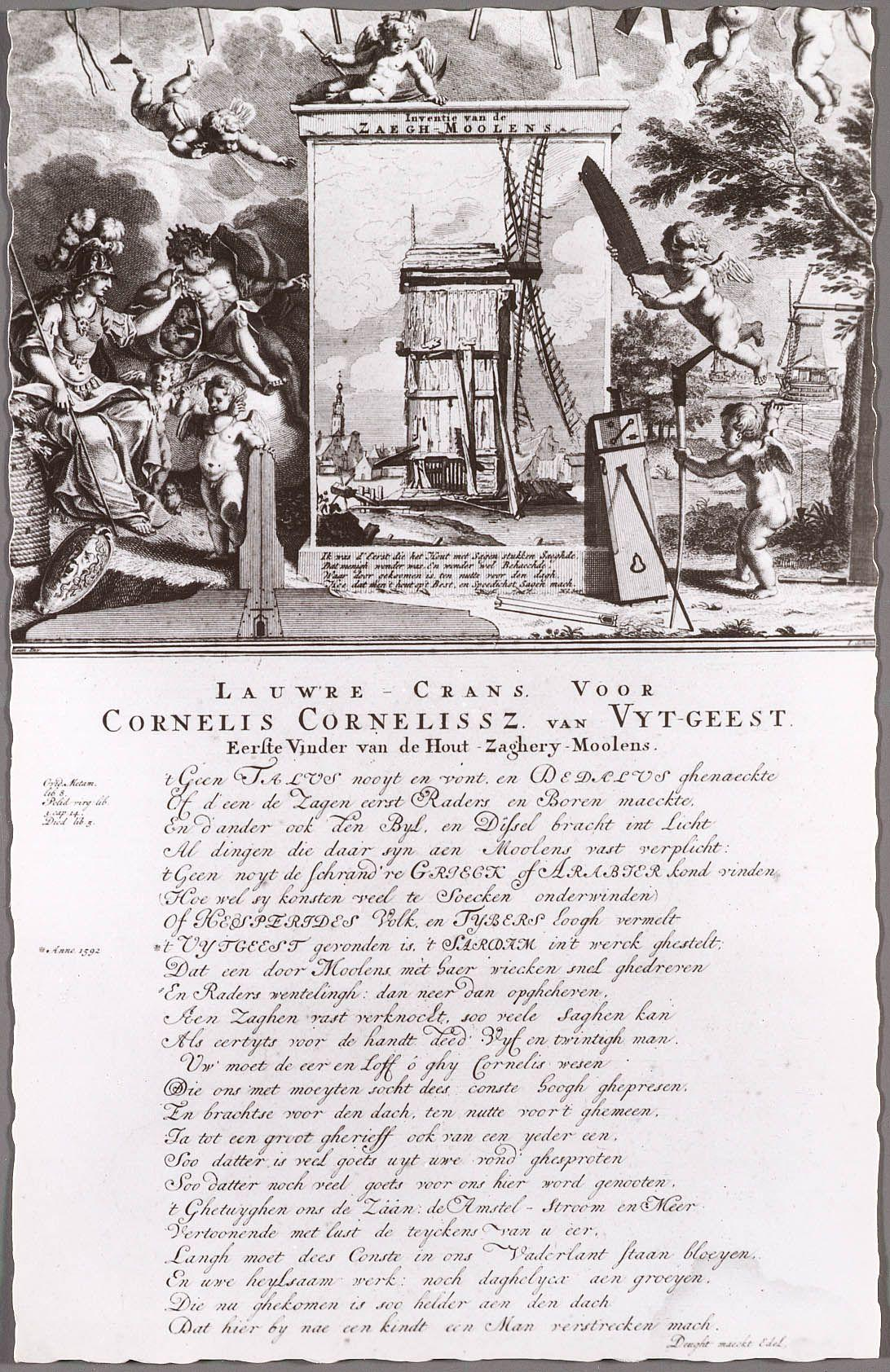
18th-century allegorical print commemorating C.C. van Uitgeest's invention of the saw mill.

Cornelis Corneliszoon van Uitgeest or Krelis Lootjes (c. 1550 – c. 1600) was a Dutch windmill owner from Uitgeest who invented the wind-powered sawmill, which made the conversion of log timber into planks 30 times faster than before.

== Biography ==
Little is known of his early life. Cornelis Cornelisz was born in the village of Uitgeest and later married Trijn Pieters, the daughter of the flour miller who owned "De Krijger" on the Meldijk there. In 1594 he built his first sawmill, a small mill which floated on a raft. In 1595 the mill was sold and moved to Alkmaar. The remains of the mill were accidentally discovered in 2004 during excavations along the Noordhollandsch Kanaal canal. His wind-powered sawmill used a crankshaft to convert a windmill's circular motion into a back-and-forward motion powering the saw. In his old age, he became a friend of the hydraulic engineer Jan Adriaanszoon Leeghwater who mentioned him as the inventor of the saag molen in his book on the Haarlemmermeer. They met during his first major hydraulic project, which was to create the Beemster, a polder that was pumped dry during the period 1609 through 1612.

He was granted a patent on his crankshaft in December, 1593 and was granted an additional patent for improvements in December, 1597 that was documented in the Resolutiën van de Staten van Holland on December, 1597. In his request, he called himself a farmer who needed to support a wife and children. His sawmill "Het Juffertje" soon developed into a more advanced version, a type known today as the paltrokmolen (post mill), which played a key part in the economic success of the Dutch Republic during the Dutch Golden Age in the 17th century by enabling the mass construction of ships for overseas trade. The mill turned the Zaan district, north of Amsterdam, into the world's first industrial area.

It is not known when exactly he died; it was sometime between 1600 and 1607.

== Other early mill patents ==
In addition to inventing the sawmill, Cornelis Corneliszoon van Uitgeest also held various other mill-related patents, including an early version of a centrifugal pump. He was not the first Dutchman to be granted a patent for a windmill. Cornelis Dircksz Muys, an engineer of Delft, was granted a patent for a small windmill in 1589. He later became known for his patent of a small dredger mill on a raft that was successful until the introduction of the steam engine. The first patent registered altogether was in 1584 by Simon Stevin for an unspecified form of water mill (probably to pump water out of a polder). Stevin's later patents were all based on mill technology, and he described his requests with mathematical explanations. He was granted nine patents in 1589, including one for the "molengang", which enabled the use of a stepped series of water mills to be used for creating polders. It was this invention that enabled the creation of the Beemster. Cornelisz van Uitgeest probably knew both of these men personally and he certainly knew their work.

== Legacy ==
A street in Uitgeest is named for him. The visitor center of the industrial heritage site managed by the Stichting Industriel Erfgoed "De Hoop" in Uitgeest is devoted to his memory.
