= Gene Rockwell =

South African singer

- Born: Gert Smit; 27 December 1944
- Died: 3 July 1998 (aged 53)
- Occupation: Musician
- Instrument: Singer
- Years active: 1950s – 1990s

Gene Rockwell (27 December 1944 – 3 July 1998) was a South African singer. His 1965 rendition of "Heart" went directly to the top of the LM Radio Top 20.

== History ==
Gene was born Gert Smit in 1944 in the town of Krugersdorp in the then Transvaal province of South Africa. He died at the age of 53 years, on 3 July 1998, of cancer.

He won his first talent competition at the age of 15, in Durban's "Little Top". Still in his teens, Gene formed The Blue Angels, later to become The Falcons, in 1963, with whom he played guitar and sang his famous gritty-blues-style songs. The original line up of the Falcons were George Usher (lead guitar), Jannie Heyns (bass guitar), Clive Swegman (rhythm guitar), Frank Rickson (drums). They played many packed out shows, becoming a staple of the dance scene in South Africa, particularly Durban.

== Discography ==
| Date | Title (A-side/B-side) | Label |
|---|---|---|
| 1965 | "Ciao" | Continental Records (8) PD.7-8971. |
| 1963 | "Back Stage" | Continental Records (8) PD.7-8971. |
| 1967 | "Cold Cold Heart" / "Will You Love Me Tomorrow" | Continental PD-9279 |
| 1968 | "Die Jare Gaan Verby" | Apple Records PD 9431 |
| 1969 | "Rocking Horse" / "Happy Man" | Public! |
| 1969 | "I Like It Like It Was" / "Love Wonderful Love" | Public! |
| 1971 | "A Soldier's Prayer" / "Forty Days" | Brigadiers |
| 1973 | "Sunshine" / "Big Lonely City" | Plum Records |
| 1976 | "Shame On Me" / "Please Don't Tell Me How The Story Ends" | Epidemic |
| 1976 | "Heart" - 2 versions | Continental Records |
