= Peter Smit (writer) =

Dutch writer

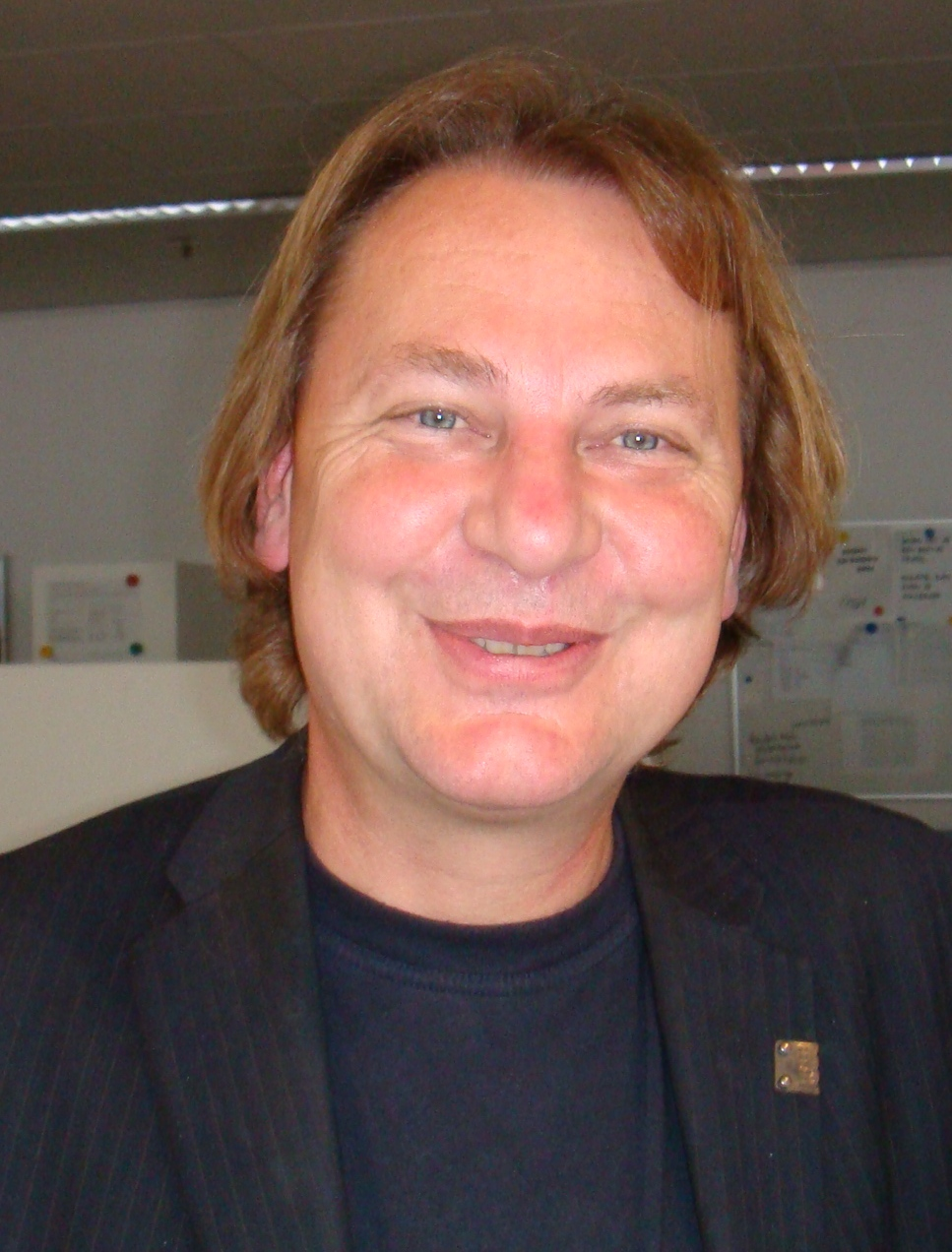
Peter Smit

Peter Smit (born April 13, 1952, in Uitgeest) is a Dutch children's writer and publicist.

From 1997 to 2001, Smit belonged to the Foundation Board LIRA, and from 1998 to 2004 he sat on the board of the Association of Writers. Since 2004 he has been director of the Foundation P.C. Hooft Prize.

From 1995, Smit specialized in writing young adult novels. He also published many picture books for beginners and children with reading problems.

== Works ==
- Onbegonnen werk (1983)
- Achter de dromer (1986)
- De nachtboerderij (1989)
- De Avondjes (1990)
- Nooit meer gapen (1992)
- De kattenmantel (1991)
- Jan Janse Weltevree (1996)
- Tips en Trucs van de Bende van de Zwarte Hand (2002)
- Het 1000 vragen quizboek (2003)
- Water bevriest bij nul graden (2004)
- Grote Boek van de kleine feiten (2005)
- Gouden Boek van Sinterklaas (2005)
- Nationaal spreekbeurtenboek (2007)
- Op avontuur met Kapitein Kwadraat (2010)
