= DeSmet (boat) =

Historic passenger boat

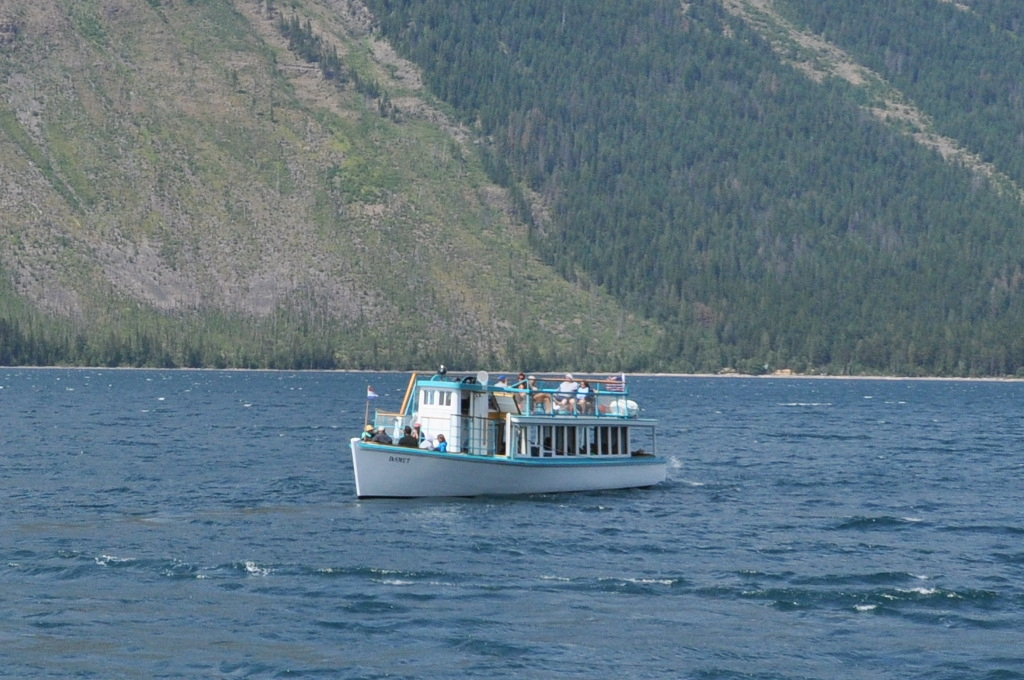
The DeSmet on Lake McDonald

Built in 1930, the DeSmet was constructed to carry passengers on Lake McDonald, Glacier National Park. In 2017 the DeSmet was listed on the National Register of Historic Places.

== History ==
Captain J.W. Swanson built the tour boat DeSmet in 1930 in only 6 weeks, for the Glacier Park Transport Company. In 1938, Arthur J. Burch, a banker from Kalispell Mt., purchased the contract to provide boat services in Glacier National Park. The DeSmet was named after Father Pierre DeSmet, a prominent Jesuit missionary in the area.

== Specifications ==
The DeSmet is a 57-foot carvel planked launch with cedar on an oak frame. The vessel is authorized by the U.S. Coast Guard to carry 70 passengers.

== Current operations ==
The DeSmet has run annually since 1930 and operates daily from mid-May until late September. During summer operations the vessel is docked behind the Lake McDonald Lodge and is used to provide boat rides to tourists in Glacier National Park. During winter months the DeSmet is stored in the historic Fish Creek Bay Boathouse at the foot of Lake McDonald.
