= Zondervan (surname) =

Zondervan is a surname. Notable people with the surname include:

- Kenrick Zondervan (born 1985), Dutch basketball player
- Krina Zondervan, Dutch biomedical scientist
- Romeo Zondervan (born 1959), Dutch footballer
