= Simon Smits =

Dutch diplomat (born 1955)

Simon J. H. Smits (born 13 September 1955) is the former Dutch ambassador to the United Kingdom. He completed a Harting Fellowship at the University of Oxford after which he entered the diplomatic service and received postings to Bangladesh, Geneva, Zagreb, The Hague, South Africa and Brussels as the permanent representative to the European Union. In 2006 he began to work for Royal Dutch Shell, and from 2011 at the Dutch Ministry of Agriculture, Innovation and Economic Affairs. He was subsequently Director General for Foreign Economic Relations at the Ministry of Foreign Affairs.
