= Desmet method =

Method for restoring the colours of early films

The Desmet Method (also known as Desmetcolor) is a method for restoring the colours of early silent films, which had originally been subjected to the processes of either:

- Film tinting – a process that suffuses the entire image a single colour
- Toning – a process that colours only the dark parts of the image
- A combination of the two

It was developed by Noël Desmet, a film archivist and restorer working for the Cinémathèque Royale de Belgique in Brussels, Belgium.

== Background ==
Before the 1960s, early coloured films were almost without exception preserved on black and white film and the colours, if recorded at all, were only noted in writing. These actions have cost many subsequent restorations dearly. However, there are a number of different methods for restoring early coloured films today, each of which nonetheless comes with its own inherent strengths and weaknesses.

The most obvious, in a way the most straightforward (though it still requires a great deal of skill and accuracy in order to be done successfully), and still the most common method today is that of copying the original coloured print ‘as is’ onto modern Eastman colour inter-negative film. From the developed inter-negative then a new colour positive print can be struck.

If set up and executed correctly, the colours in the new positive print can resemble very closely the colours in the original print but only as they survive today. Therefore, whatever fading, decomposition and/or other changes, which may have occurred to the colours down through the years, will also be copied along with them. Beyond the possibility to make very slight improvements to the saturation this method offers little in the way of any colour restoration. There are, meanwhile, other notable disadvantages, not least the use of modern colour film stock. Colour film is both expensive and has questionable archival permanence, as modern colour dyes are known to fade in time.

It was largely as a result of these problems that Noël Desmet, starting in the 1960s, developed his own flashing method for restoring silent films, which had originally been coloured either by the process of tinting or toning (or both). With Desmet's method, the original colour print is first copied onto modern, panchromatic black and white inter-negative film, rather than colour film. The colours are then applied later during production of the positive print.

== Technique ==
For the reproduction of a print coloured by tinting only, the developed black and white inter-negative is first printed onto modern colour print stock in an initial printing pass. The same piece of film is then flashed with the appropriate coloured light (or a neutral light shone through a colour filter) in a second printing pass.

The result is effectively little more than a colour image on top of a black and white one but the illusion is quite convincing. The use of coloured lights or filters, meanwhile, allows one greater freedom in attempting to reproduce the colours as they might have originally looked.

For the reproduction of prints coloured by toning, the developed black and white inter-negative is exposed onto colour print film using a coloured light source rather than a neutral one. As the light passes more easily through the light parts of the negative image, the result will be colour in only the dark parts of the positive image, effectively simulating the original tone.

Combined tints and tones can be reproduced using this same process, to simulate the tone, but with the addition of a second printing pass to colour the light parts of the image, simulating the original tint. It is very important to balance the colours correctly during testing beforehand since, as the second pass covers the whole image, the two colours are apt to mix.

== Benefits and drawbacks ==
The main benefits of the Desmet method are in cost, as black and white negative film is still generally cheaper than colour film. In addition, the black and white inter-negative provides a greater archival record than colour film, since it is not subject to the same fading as the colour dyes used in modern colour inter-negative films.

However, the Desmet method is not without its drawbacks. Principle among these is that the technique cannot be employed for more selectively coloured prints, such as those coloured by the Pathécolor (later Pathéchrome) stencil process or the Handschiegl processes. These prints must still be copied directly onto modern colour inter-negative film or scanned to a digital format, manipulated digitally and then recorded back onto film.

The use of modern colour film for the positive print is another drawback. Modern colour film stock effectively produces the required colour range by the subtractive mix of cyan, magenta and yellow dyes. These dyes are incapable of reproducing the same levels of saturation and hue as some of the single colour dyes used to colour the film in the first place, particularly primary colours such as red and green. Nonetheless, the Desmet method still offers a greater range of saturated colours than the colour inter-negative method.

It is still technically possible to reproduce these vintage colour effects by means of the original methods today. This is, of course, the most accurate method in terms of reproduction, though even then it cannot be said to be entirely accurate, as modern black-and-white print film, whilst very similar to the film used in the early years of cinema, will still exhibit different properties to the film stocks used then. It is also the most complex, time-consuming and expensive procedure. Moreover, many of the toxic dyes originally offered by manufacturers are no longer available today, on account of increased health and safety standards. Those available, meanwhile, can often only be purchased at great expense. As a result, only a select few film laboratories specialised in film restoration are capable of offering this facility today.

Another method worth mentioning, which has become increasingly common in recent years, is to transfer the original colour print to a high resolution digital format and manipulate the image in the digital domain before reconstituting it back on film. Without a doubt this method offers the widest freedom in terms of restoration, since many things are possible with digital that would not be possible by traditional photochemical means.

It is also, however, the most ethically questionable, since it involves the transfer to a different medium, which comes with its own unique properties and limitations, losing many of the inherent, film-like properties of the original along the way. It is also the least archivally sound, since the longevity of digital media formats has not yet been determined. Thus, while digital techniques in film restoration are undoubtedly on the rise, they are still far from becoming standard.

== See also ==
- Colour motion picture film
- Film preservation
- Film tinting
- Silent film
