= Wim De Smet =

Flemish zoologist

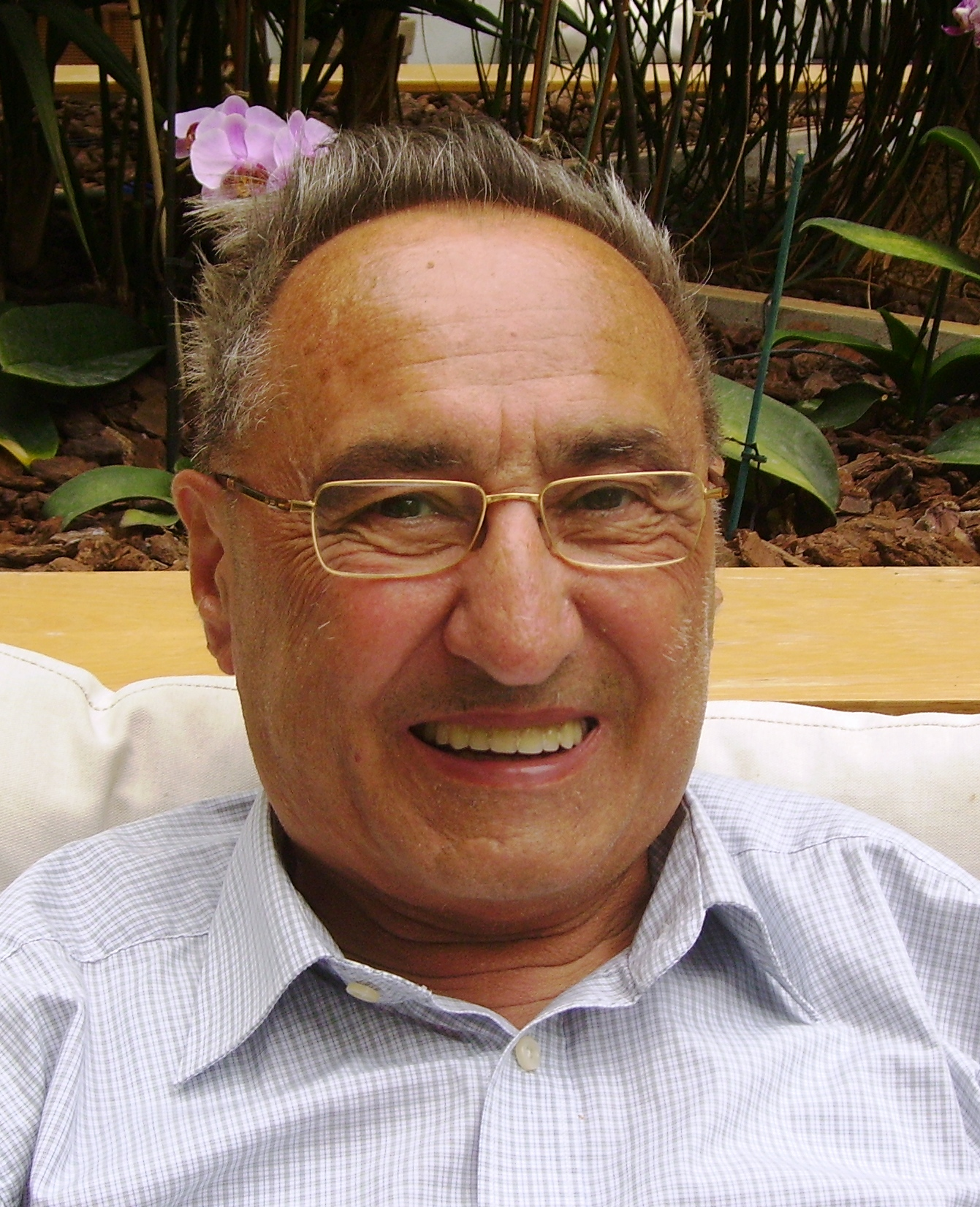
- Wim De Smet in 2009
- Born: 19 October 1932; Antwerp, Flanders
- Died: 10 March 2012 (aged 79); Brasschaat, Flanders
- Scientific career
- Fields: Zoology

Wim De Smet (19 October 1932 – 10 March 2012) was a Flemish zoologist, specialized in marine mammals, and an esperantist. He published a lot of scientific and popularizing articles in Dutch, English, French and Esperanto. He projected an entirely new system for the naming and classification of animals and plants.

== Career ==
De Smet graduated in zoology in 1954 at the Catholic University of Louvain after which he became a teacher in secondary schools (1955–61) and completed his studies and researches at foreign universities : Bloemfontein, Padua, Stockholm, Glasgow (and later also in Amsterdam, Utrecht and in research institutes in London, Copenhagen and Stockholm). In 1961 he was appointed as a Junior Researcher of the National (Belgian) Research Fund (1961–1963). In 1966 De Smet earned a doctor's degree at the Catholic University of Louvain. In the years 1963–1968 he worked as an Educational Assistant at the Institute of Natural Sciences. In 1968–1980 he was a Senior Research Worker at the Antwerp University Centre. In 1975, because of his merits in the domain of marine mammals, De Smet was adjudged the Henri Schouteden-award by the Royal Flemish Academy of Belgium for Science and the Arts. In 1980–1984 he was in charge of the Department of the General Scientific Services at the Institute of Natural Sciences. He served as a Professor of Zoology at the National University of Ruanda (1986–1987) and at similar institutions in Suriname (1988–1990) and Gabon (1991–1994) until his retirement in 1994.

Later, as Full Professor of the Akademio Internacia de la Sciencoj San Marino he still lectured at summer schools in Trier and Bydgoszcz.

== Esperanto ==
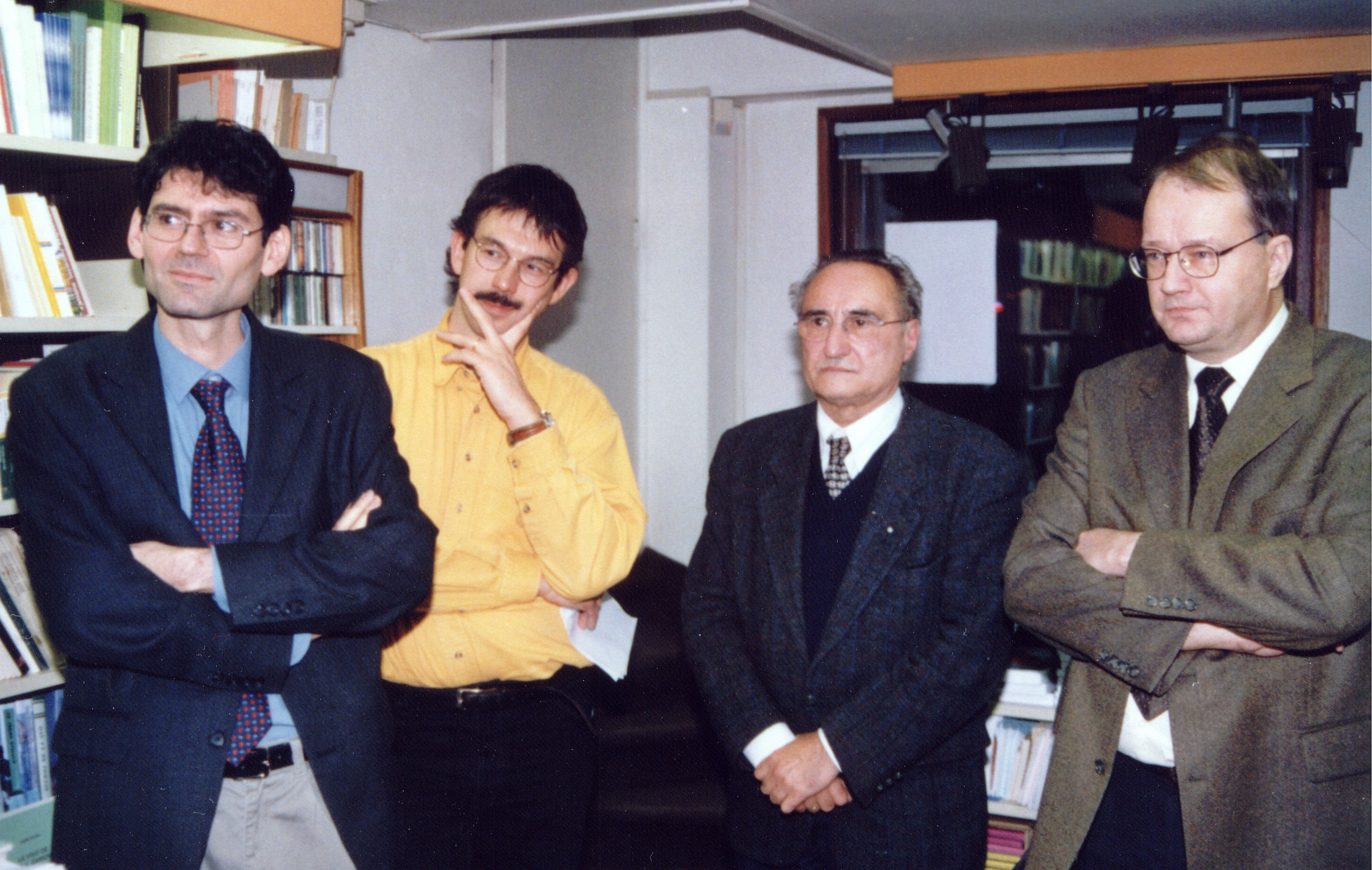
Wim De Smet in 2001 (second from the right).

Since 1957 De Smet took an interest in Esperanto. He was a well-known figure in the local, Flemish kaj international Esperanto-movement. In this connection he published a text-book for self-study in 1982. He was the main initiator of the idea for coming off the 67-nd World Congress of Esperanto in Antwerp. Because of an Esperanto written contribution, De Smet earned the UMEA-award in Japan.

De Smet was a full member of the Akademio Internacia de la Sciencoj (AIS) of San Marino, since the foundation of this academy.

== New Biological Nomenclature ==
During his career daily confronted with the imperfections of the existing zoological nomenclature, already in the 1950s De Smet began developing an entirely new concept, without distinction between animals or plants, even with the possibility of housing the bacteria into the system. Translating the existing names into Esperanto is not the point, but a simplification, modernization and better handling of the ancient respectable Systema naturae. One of the aims was limiting the number of names, for example by elimination of the names of the genera.

De Smet defined "New Biological Nomenclature" as follows:

New Biological Nomenclature is NOT : the naming of animals and plants into Esperanto.

But it IS : a new nomenclature-system that relies on new ideas and that uses Esperanto for its names.

New Biological Nomencalature (N.B.N.) is a system :

- which can be used in parallel with the nomenclature of Linnaeus, and without hampering it;
- which forms names in a logical manner;
- which relies on the present-day knowledge of biology;
- which is not troubled by obsolete traditions in nomenclature;
- which allows finding the position of a species in the whole of living things;
- which employs names that are easily to commit to memory and to pronounce;
- which introduces a new definition of "type";
- which gives new chances for the taxonomists to lay out new collections and to select in them their N.B.N.-types;
- which applies for enthusiasm and collaboration of a lot of people in order to propose N.B.N.-names;
- which warrants efficiency.
