= De Smet (surname) =

De Smet or Desmet is a Dutch occupational surname. It is a regional form of "the smith" very common in East and West Flanders. It was the tenth most common name in Belgium in 1997. Notable people with the surname include:

== Sports ==
- Andy De Smet (born 1970), Belgian road cyclist
- Armand Desmet (1931–2012), Belgian cyclist
- Gérard Desmet (1907–1979), Belgian cyclist
- Gérard Desmet (1910–1976), Belgian cyclist
- Gilbert Desmet (born 1931), Belgian cyclist
- Gilbert De Smet (1936–1987), Belgian racing cyclist
- Gustaaf De Smet (1935–2020), Belgian cyclist
- Hanne Desmet (born 1996), Belgian short track speed skater
- Hannelore Desmet (born 1989), Belgian athlete
- Jenny De Smet (born 1958), Belgian racing cyclist
- Karel De Smet (born 1980), Belgian footballer
- Lenn De Smet and Liam De Smet (born 2004), Belgian footballer twins
- Léopold Desmet (born 1935), Belgian gymnast
- Louis Desmet (born 1930), Belgian middle-distance runner
- Luc De Smet (born 1957), Belgian cyclist
- Mathieu De Smet (born 2000), Belgian footballer
- Pieter Desmet (born 1983), Belgian steeplechase and long-distance runner
- Philippe Desmet (born 1958), Belgian football player
- René De Smet (1931–1985), Belgian racing cyclist
- Stijn De Smet (born 1985), Belgian football player
- Théo-Léo De Smet (1917–?), Belgian water polo player
- Thibault De Smet (born 1998), Belgian footballer
- Tom Desmet (born 1969), Belgian cyclist

== Arts and other occupations ==
- Anne Desmet (born 1964), British artist
- Catherine de Smet (born 1959), French art historian
- Claudia De Smet (born 1973), Belgian contemporary dancer
- Dirk De Smet (born 1969), Belgian singer and saxophonist
- Eugène de Smet (1787–1872), Belgian politician
- Francis De Smet (born 1963), Belgian inventor and film producer
- François De Smet (born 1977), Belgian journalist and politician
- Gustave De Smet (1877–1943), Belgian painter, brother of Léon
- Hendrik de Smet (1535–1614), Belgian physician and humanist scholar
- Ingrid De Smet, Belgian-British scholar of Renaissance literature
- Jean-Baptiste de Smet (1674–1741), Roman Catholic bishop of Ghent
- Jessy De Smet (born 1976), Belgian singer
- Joseph Jean De Smet (1794–1877), priest and historian who took part in the Belgian Revolution of 1830
- Léon De Smet (1881–1966), Belgian painter, brother of Gustav
- Marcel Desmet (1892–1973), French architect
- Maria Desmet-Delrue (1898–1982), Belgian politician
- Michel de Smet (1912–2006), Belgian poet
- Michel Desmet (1933–2022), French civil servant and politician
- Paul de Smet de Naeyer (1843–1913), Belgian Catholic Party politician
- Pierre De Smet (1892–1975), Belgian politician
- Peter de Smet (1944–2003), Dutch comic strip artist
- Pierre-Jean De Smet (1801–1873), Belgian Jesuit priest and missionary in North America
- Pieter De Smet (1503–1571), Flemish humanist scholar and government official in Bruges
- Richard De Smet (1916–1997), Belgian Jesuit Indologist and philosopher
- Victor Desmet (1919–2018), French soldier, member of the Free French forces, Companion of the Liberation
- Wim De Smet (1932–2012), Belgian marine zoologist and esperantist
- Wolfgang de Smet (1617–1685), Flemish painter active in Leuven

== See also ==
- De Smet (disambiguation)
- Desmet (disambiguation) ·Desmet (surname) ·All pages · Living people · WP search · links
