= Jan Smits =

Dutch law professor (born 1967)

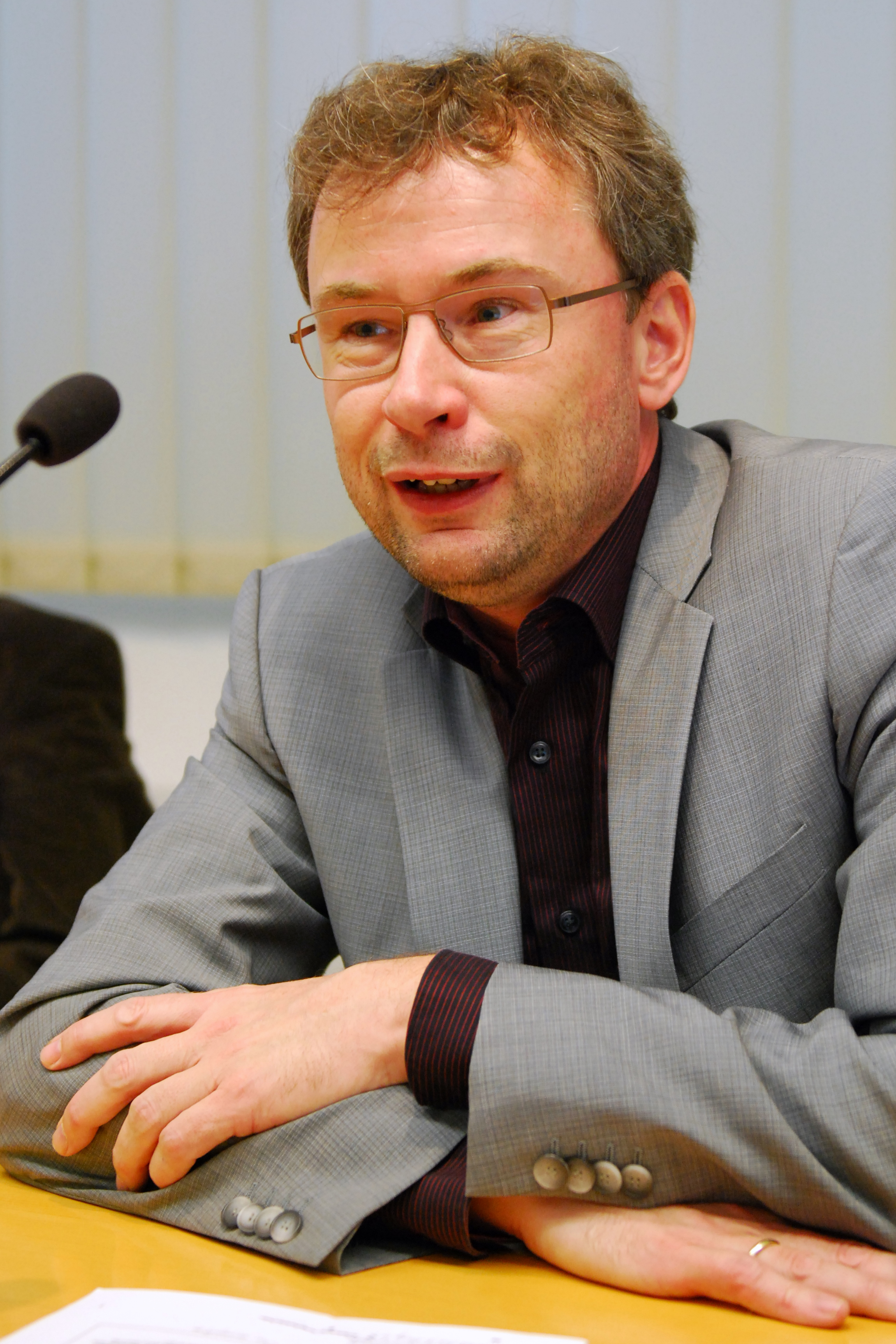
Jan Smits talking at a conference (2011)

Jan M. Smits (born 1967) is a Dutch law professor. He is the Dean of the Faculty of Law at Maastricht University, where he is also professor of private law.

== Early life and education ==
Smits was born in Leiden in 1967. Between 1986 and 1991 he studied law at Leiden University and at the University of Poitiers. In 1995, he obtained his PhD degree from Leiden University on a thesis about the foundations of contractual liability.

== Career ==
Smits then taught at Stellenbosch University and in Tilburg and Maastricht. In 1999, he was appointed to the chair of European private law at Maastricht University, a position he temporarily left between 2008 and 2010 to become professor of European private law and comparative law at Tilburg University. In October 2010 he returned to Maastricht and founded there the Maastricht European Private Law Institute (M-EPLI).

Smits is known for his critical view of the European harmonisation process; he is also a fierce believer in legal science as both a national and international discipline. He held visiting positions at a number of foreign institutions, including Tulane University Law School, the University of Leuven, the University of Liège, Louisiana State University and the Penn State Dickinson School of Law.

Jan Smits is a member of the Ius Commune Research School. He is a member of the Royal Netherlands Academy of Arts and Sciences since 2010. It was announced in July 2017 that Smits would become the new Dean of Maastricht University's Faculty of Law.
