= Schmidt (surname) =

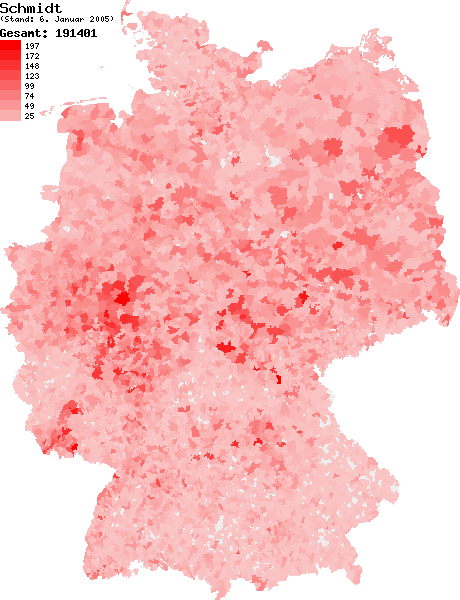
Distribution of the name Schmidt in Germany

Schmidt is a common German occupational surname derived from the German word "Schmied" meaning "blacksmith" and/or "metalworker". This surname is the German equivalent of "Smith" in the English-speaking world.

== A–G ==
- Adriano Schmidt (born 1994), Vietnamese footballer
- Aki Schmidt (1935–2016), German footballer
- Albert Schmidt (disambiguation), multiple people
- Alexander Schmidt (disambiguation), multiple people
- Alexandra M. Schmidt, Brazilian statistician
- Alfred Schmidt (disambiguation), multiple people
- Alica Schmidt (born 1998), German runner
- Andreas Schmidt (disambiguation), multiple people
- Andy Schmidt, American comic book editor and writer
- Annie M. G. Schmidt (1911–1995), Dutch writer
- Arlo Schmidt (1931-2022), American politician and auctioneer
- Arno Schmidt (1914–1979), German author and translator
- Arthur Schmidt (disambiguation), multiple people
- Bernhard Schmidt (1879–1935), Estonian-German astronomer, inventor of the Schmidt camera
- Bettina Schmidt (1960–2019), East German luger
- Bogusz Schmidt (born 1999), German politician
- Brian Schmidt (disambiguation), multiple people
- Bruno Oscar Schmidt (born 1986), Brazilian beach volleyball player
- Burghart Schmidt (1942–2022), German philosopher
- Burghart Schmidt (historian) (born 1962), German historian
- Carl Schmidt (disambiguation), multiple people
- Carl Friedrich Schmidt (disambiguation), multiple people
- Carmela Schmidt (born 1962), East German freestyle swimmer
- Caroline Schmidt (born 1960), Swedish politician
- Carolina Schmidt (born 1967), Chilean politician and businesswoman
- Carsten Schmidt (born 1963), German business executive
- Casimir Schmidt (born 1995), Dutch artistic gymnast
- Casper Schmidt (1842–1889), American politician
- Charles Schmidt (disambiguation), multiple people
- Christen Schmidt (1727–1804), Norwegian bishop
- Christfried Schmidt (1932–2025), German composer and arrangeur
- Christoph M. Schmidt (born 1962), German economist
- Clarke Schmidt (born 1996), American baseball player
- Colton Schmidt (born 1990), American football player
- Cornelia Schmidt-Liermann (born 1963), Argentine politician
- Cristian Schmidt (born 1982), Argentine judoka
- Dagmar Schmidt (born 1973), German politician
- Dallas Schmidt (1922–2007), Canadian fighter pilot
- Damián Schmidt (born 1992), Argentine retired footballer
- Daniel Schmidt (disambiguation), multiple people
- David Schmidt (disambiguation), multiple people
- Dennis Schmidt (disambiguation), multiple people
- Diane Grob Schmidt, American chemist
- Doke Schmidt (born 1992), Dutch footballer
- Douglas C. Schmidt (born 1962), American computer scientist
- Earl W. Schmidt (1936–2024), American jurist and politician
- Edna Schmidt (1969–2021), American journalist
- Eduard Oscar Schmidt (1823–1886), German zoologist and phycologist
- Ekkhard Schmidt-Opper (born 1961), German field hockey player
- Elisa Sophia Schmidt, see Femme Schmidt
- Erhard Schmidt (1876–1959), German mathematician
- Eric Schmidt (born 1955), executive chairman, former CEO, of Google
- Erica Schmidt (born 1975), American theatre director and writer
- Erich Schmidt (disambiguation), multiple people
- Eugen Schmidt (1862–1931), Danish athlete
- Eugen Schmidt (born 1975), German politician
- Femme Schmidt (born 1990), German singer
- Ferenc Schmidt (1941–2011), Hungarian politician and MP
- Firmin Martin Schmidt (1918–2005), American Roman Catholic bishop
- Francis Schmidt (1885–1944), American college baseball coach
- Franklin J. W. Schmidt (1901–1935), American naturalist, brother of Karl Patterson
- Franz Schmidt (disambiguation), multiple people
- Frederick Schmidt (disambiguation), multiple people
- Friedrich Schmidt (disambiguation), multiple people
- Frithjof Schmidt (born 1953), German politician
- Fritz Schmidt (disambiguation), multiple people
- Gabriele Schmidt (born 1956), German politician
- Gavin Schmidt, climatologist
- Georg Schmidt (disambiguation), multiple people
- George Schmidt (1927–1995), American football player
- Gerhard Schmidt (disambiguation), multiple people
- Grant Schmidt (born 1948), Canadian politician
- Gunter Schmidt (disambiguation), multiple people

== H–L ==
- Hans Schmidt (disambiguation)
- Hansjörg Schmidt (born 1974), German politician
- Harald Schmidt (born 1957), German television entertainer
- Harry Schmidt (disambiguation), multiple people
- Harv Schmidt (1935–2020), American baseball player
- Harvey Schmidt (1929–2018), American composer
- Heide Schmidt (born 1948), Austrian politician
- Heinrich Schmidt (disambiguation), multiple people
- Helga Schmidt-Neuber (1937–2018), German swimmer
- Helge Kjærulff-Schmidt (1906–1982), Danish actor
- Helle Thorning-Schmidt (born 1966), Danish Prime Minister
- Helmut Schmidt (disambiguation), multiple people
- Herbert B. Schmidt (1931–2024), German economist
- Howard A. Schmidt (1949–2017), American computer security specialist
- Ines Schmidt (born 1960), German politician
- Ingrid Schmidt (1945–2023), German backstroke swimmer
- Irmin Schmidt (born 1937), German rock keyboard player
- Isaac Schmidt (born 1999), Swiss footballer
- Isaac Jacob Schmidt (1779–1847), Dutch/Russian linguist and academician
- Jan Schmidt (disambiguation), multiple people
- Jacques Schmidt (1933–1996), French costume designer
- Jason Schmidt (born 1973), American baseball player
- Jean Schmidt (born 1951), American politician
- Jean Dolores Schmidt (1919–2025), American nun better known as Sister Jean
- Jessica Schmidt (born 1979), German chess grandmaster
- Jeff Schmidt (disambiguation), multiple people
- Jimmy Schmidt (born 1981), Uruguayan footballer
- Joan Schmidt (1920–2003), Australien cricket player
- João Schmidt (born 1993), Brazilian footballer
- Jochen Schmidt (born 1970), German writer and translator
- Jochen Schmidt (dance critic) (1936–2010), German journalist, critic and book author
- Johann Schmidt (disambiguation), multiple people
- Johannes Schmidt (disambiguation), multiple people
- John Schmidt, American lawyer and politician
- Joost Schmidt (1893–1948), teacher at the Bauhaus
- Jordan Schmidt (born 1989), American music producer
- Joseph Schmidt (disambiguation), multiple people
- Joshua Schmidt (born 1986), American Army Iraq War Veteran
- Józef Szmidt (1935-2024), Polish Olympic athlete
- Julian Schmidt (disambiguation), multiple people
- Julius Schmidt (disambiguation)
- Justin Schmidt (disambiguation), multiple people
- Jürgen Schmidt (born 1941), German speed skater
- Kaj Schmidt (1926–2004), Danish Olympic sprint canoer
- Karl Patterson Schmidt (1890–1957), American herpetologist
- Kate Schmidt (born 1953), American javelin thrower
- Katrin Schmidt (born 1986), German-Swedish football player
- Katrin Schmidt (badminton) (born 1967), German badminton player
- Katherine Schmidt (1899–1978), American artist
- Kendall Schmidt (born 1990), American actor, singer
- Klaus Schmidt (disambiguation), multiple people
- Konstanty Schmidt-Ciążyński (1818–1889), Polish collector and art connoisseur, who donated a large collection to the National Museum in Kraków
- Kurt Schmidt (1891–1945), German Lieutenant-General during the Second World War
- Lauren Schmidt Hissrich (born 1978), American TV producer and screenwriter
- Leni Schmidt (1906–1985), German athlete
- Lissy Schmidt (1959-1994), German journalist
- Luís Eduardo Schmidt (born 1979), Brazilian football player
- Lukas Schmidt (born 1988), German badminton player

== M–Z ==
- Maarten Schmidt (1929–2022), Dutch-American astronomer
- Mae Doelling Schmidt (1888–1965), American pianist
- Manuela Schmidt (born 1963), German politician
- Mária Schmidt (born 1953), Hungarian historian
- Marie Schmidt (1895–1971), German political activist and politician
- Markus Schmidt (disambiguation), multiple people
- Martin Schmidt (disambiguation), multiple people
- Martina Maxi Schmidt (born 1988), German politician
- Matthew Schmidt (born 1971), American film editor
- Max Schmidt (1818–1901), German painter
- Max Schmidt (Waffen-SS) (1920–2002), commandant Fürstengrube subcamp of Auschwitz, March 1944 – January 1945
- Melanie Schmidt, Marfan Syndrome Survivor
- Melissa Schmidt, American politician
- Micaela Schmidt (born 1970), German rower
- Michael Schmidt (disambiguation), multiple people
- Milt Schmidt (1918–2017), Canadian hockey player
- Monika Schmidt (born 1956), Australian judge
- Nate Schmidt (born 1991), American ice hockey player
- Noémie Schmidt (born 1990), Swiss actress
- Olaf Schmidt (born 1962), German glider aerobatic pilot
- Ole Schmidt (1928–2010), Danish conductor and composer
- Oliver Schmidt (disambiguation), multiple people
- Olle Schmidt (born 1949), Swedish politician
- Oscar Schmidt (disambiguation), multiple people
  - Oscar Schmidt (1958–2026), Brazilian basketball player
- Otto Schmidt (disambiguation), multiple people
- Pascal Schmidt, German footballer
- Patrick Schmidt (disambiguation), multiple people
- Paul Schmidt (disambiguation), multiple people
- Peter Schmidt (disambiguation), multiple people
- Petra Schmidt (born 1963), German soprano
- Pyotr Schmidt (1867–1906, Russian revolutionary of 1905
- Rachel Schmidt (born 1994), New Zealand trampolinist
- Rainer Schmidt (disambiguation), multiple people
- Renate Schmidt (born 1943), German Federal Minister for family affairs
- Rob Schmidt (born 1965), American film director and writer
- Rodger Gustaf Schmidt (born 1952), Canadian–German curler
- Roger Schmidt (disambiguation)
- Roman Schmidt (disambiguation), multiple people
- Sebastian Schmidt (disambiguation), multiple people
- Sebestyén Schmidt (1901–1987), Hungarian cyclist
- Signe Torborg Schmidt-Nielsen (1878–1959), Swedish-Norwegian physicist and nutritionist
- Sigrid Schmidt (born 1930), German ethnologist and folklorist
- Sophie Schmidt, Canadian soccer player
- Sophie Schmidt (publisher), American publisher
- Stefan Schmidt (disambiguation), multiple people
- Steve Schmidt (disambiguation), multiple people
- Susan Schmidt, American investigative reporter
- Thomas Schmidt (disambiguation), multiple people
- Tim Schmidt (born 1986), Australian rules footballer
- Tony Schmidt (born 1980), German racing driver
- Torge Schmidt (born 1988), German politician
- Torsten Schmidt (disambiguation), multiple people
- Trudeliese Schmidt (1934–2004), German opera singer
- Ulla Schmidt (born 1949), German Federal Minister for health
- Ulrich Schmidt (born 1957), German serial killer and rapist
- Uwe Schmidt (born 1966), German politician
- Vasili Schmidt (1886–1938), Soviet politician and statesman
- Vera Schmidt (born 1982), Hungarian singer-songwriter
- Victoria Schmidt, New Zealand actress
- Viktoria Schmidt-Linsenhoff (1944–2013), German art historian and professor
- Vivien A. Schmidt (born 1949), political science academic
- Walter Schmidt (disambiguation), multiple people
- Wayne Schmidt (born 1966), American politician
- Wendy Schmidt (1955), American businesswoman and philanthropist
- Wilhelm Schmidt (disambiguation), multiple people
- William Schmidt (disambiguation), multiple people
- Wilma Schmidt (1926–2022), German operatic soprano
- Wolfgang Schmidt (disambiguation), multiple people
- Yuri Schmidt (1937–2013), Russian human rights lawyer
- Zygmunt Schmidt (born 1941), Polish footballer

== In fiction ==
- Anna Schmidt, West German student in Mind Your Language, played by Jacki Harding
- Hildegarde Schmidt, character in Murder on the Orient Express
- Johann Schmidt, alias Red Skull, villain character from Marvel Comics
- Kimmy Schmidt, title character in Unbreakable Kimmy Schmidt played by Ellie Kemper
- Mika Schmidt, playable character in Genshin Impact
- Mike Schmidt, the security guard protagonist of the first Five Nights at Freddy's game and in the Five Nights at Freddy's film played by Josh Hutcherson
- Shirley Schmidt, American lawyer in Boston Legal played by Candice Bergen
- Warren R. Schmidt, title character in About Schmidt played by Jack Nicholson
- Winston Schmidt, character from New Girl
- Dr Klaus Schmidt, leader of the Hellfire Club in the film X-Men: First Class

== See also ==
- Smith (surname)
- Schmitt (disambiguation)
- Schmitz
- Schmid
- Schmied
- Smits
- Šmits
- Smeets
