= Brian Smith =

Brian Smith may refer to:

== Academics and educators ==
- Sir Brian Smith (chemist) (1933–2023), British university administrator
- Brian David Smith (born 1961), English academic researcher, author and adviser in the area of strategic management
- Brian Cantwell Smith (1950–2025), Dean of the Faculty of Information Studies at the University of Toronto
- Brian K. Smith, professor of education and computer science at Boston College

== Arts and entertainment ==
- Brian Smith (New Zealand musician) (born 1939), jazz saxophonist
- Brian Smith (Canadian musician) (born 1949), guitarist of the rock band Trooper
- Brian Smith (photographer) (born 1959), American sports and celebrity portrait photographer
- Brian Reffin Smith (born 1946), British writer, artist and teacher
- Brian Thomas Smith (born 1977), American actor and comedian
- Brian J. Smith (born 1981), American actor
- Brian Michael Smith (born 1983), American actor
- Brian Smith (American musician) (born 1990), American musician with Biological Lovers
- Brian Bowen Smith, American photographer
- Brian S. Smith, character in the comic strip Piled Higher and Deeper

== Politics and law ==
- Brian Smith (Canadian politician) (born 1934), British Columbia politician
- Brian Smith (Connecticut politician), member of the Connecticut House of Representatives
- Brian Smith (Pennsylvania politician), member of the Pennsylvania House of Representatives
- Brian Smith (Vermont politician), member of the Vermont House of Representatives

== Sports ==
=== American football ===
- Brian Smith (defensive back, born 1979), American football player and coach
- Brian Smith (defensive back, born 1990), American football player
- Brian Smith (defensive end) (born 1983), American football player for the Jacksonville Jaguars
- Brian Smith (linebacker, born 1966), American football player
- Brian Smith (linebacker, born 1989), American football player
- Brian Smith (American football coach, born 1980), American football player and coach

=== Other sports ===
- Brian Smith (baseball) (born 1972), Major League Baseball pitcher for the Pittsburgh Pirates
- Brian Smith (cyclist) (born 1967), Scottish cyclist turned commentator
- Brian Smith (ice hockey, born 1937), former ice hockey player
- Brian Smith (ice hockey, born 1940) (1940–1995), former ice hockey player and Canadian sportscaster
- Brian Smith (footballer, born 1955) (1955–2013), English professional footballer
- Brian Smith (footballer, born 1966), English footballer who played for Sheffield United
- Brian Smith (racing driver) (born 1975), racing driver from Argentina
- Brian Smith (rugby league, born 1954), rugby league player and coach
- Brian Smith (rugby, born 1966) (1966–2026), rugby league player and rugby union player and coach

== Others ==
- Brian Smith (bishop) (born 1943), British bishop
- Brian Smith (priest) (born 1944), retired Anglican priest
- Brian L. Smith (born 1939), Royal Canadian Air Force officer
- Brian Steven Smith, South African-Canadian serial killer, see murder of Kathleen Jo Henry

== See also ==
- Bryan Smith (disambiguation)
- Brian Smyth (disambiguation)
- Brian Schmidt (disambiguation)
- Brian Kent-Smith (born 1935), British middle-distance runner
