= Šmits =

Family name

Origin
- Language: German
- Region of origin: Latvia

Other names
- Related names: Kalējs

Šmits (feminine: Šmite and Šmita) is a Latvian masculine surname derived from the German occupational surname Schmidt, from the German language word schmied meaning "blacksmith" and/or "metalworker"."

People with the surname Šmits include:

- Anatolijs Šmits (1941–1998), Latvian chess master
- Emīlija Šmite (1899 – 16 September 1977) was a Latvian chess player
- Jānis Šmits (also known as Yanis Smits; 1941–2020), Latvian theologian and Baptist pastor
- Jānis Šmits (born 1968), Latvian politician
- Rolands Šmits (born 1995), Latvian basketball player
