= Franz Schmidt =

Franz Schmidt may refer to:

- Franz Schmidt (composer) (1874–1939), Austro-Hungarian composer, cellist and pianist
- Franz Schmidt (executioner)
- Franz Schmidt (footballer) (born 2000), Peruvian soccer player
- Franz Schmidt (serial killer) (1930–2017), Austrian serial killer

== See also ==
- Franz Schmitt, German Olympic wrestler
