= Ostholstein – Stormarn-Nord =

Federal electoral district of Germany

9 Ostholstein – Stormarn-Nord
- Electoral district for the Bundestag
- Ostholstein – Stormarn-Nord in 2025
- State: Schleswig-Holstein
- Population: 220,600 (2019)
- Electorate: 183,138 (2021)
- Major settlements: Bad Schwartau; Eutin
- Area: 1,533.7 km^{2}

Current electoral district
- Created: 1976
- Party: CDU
- Member: Sebastian Schmidt
- Elected: 2025

Ostholstein – Stormarn-Nord (English: Ostholstein – Stormarn-North) is an electoral constituency (German: Wahlkreis) represented in the Bundestag. It elects one member via first-past-the-post voting. Under the current constituency numbering system, it is designated as constituency 9. It is located in eastern Schleswig-Holstein, comprising the Ostholstein district and northeastern parts of the Stormarn district. Since 2025, it has been represented by Sebastian Schmidt of the CDU.

Ostholstein – Stormarn-Nord was created for the 1976 federal election. From 2021 to 2025, it has been represented by Bettina Hagedorn of the Social Democratic Party (SPD).

== Geography ==
Ostholstein – Stormarn-Nord is located in eastern Schleswig-Holstein. As of the 2021 federal election, it comprises the entirety of the Ostholstein district, and the municipality of Reinfeld and Amt of Nordstormarn from the Stormarn district.

== History ==
Ostholstein – Stormarn-Nord was created in 1976, then known as Ostholstein. It contained parts of the abolished constituencies of Plön and Segeberg – Eutin. Originally, it was coterminous with the Ostholstein district. In the 1998 election, the municipality of Reinfeld and Amt of Nordstormarn were transferred from Segeberg – Stormarn-Nord to Ostholstein. The constituency acquired its current name in the 2013 election.

Election	No.	Name	Borders
1976	9	Ostholstein	Ostholstein district
1980	9	Ostholstein	Ostholstein district
1983	9	Ostholstein	Ostholstein district
1987	9	Ostholstein	Ostholstein district
1990	9	Ostholstein	Ostholstein district
1994	9	Ostholstein	Ostholstein district
1998	9	Ostholstein	Ostholstein district; Stormarn district (only Reinfeld municipality and Nordstormarn Amt)
2002	9	Ostholstein	Ostholstein district; Stormarn district (only Reinfeld municipality and Nordstormarn Amt)
2005	9	Ostholstein	Ostholstein district; Stormarn district (only Reinfeld municipality and Nordstormarn Amt)
2009	9	Ostholstein	Ostholstein district; Stormarn district (only Reinfeld municipality and Nordstormarn Amt)
2013	9	Ostholstein – Stormarn-Nord	Ostholstein district; Stormarn district (only Reinfeld municipality and Nordstormarn Amt)
2017	9	Ostholstein – Stormarn-Nord	Ostholstein district; Stormarn district (only Reinfeld municipality and Nordstormarn Amt)
2021	9	Ostholstein – Stormarn-Nord	Ostholstein district; Stormarn district (only Reinfeld municipality and Nordstormarn Amt)
2025	9	Ostholstein – Stormarn-Nord	Ostholstein district; Stormarn district (only Reinfeld municipality and Nordstormarn Amt)

== Members ==
The constituency was held by the Christian Democratic Union (CDU) from its creation in 1976 until 1980, during which time it was represented by Karl Carstens, who resigned in 1979 to become President of the Federal Republic. The constituency was won by the Social Democratic Party (SPD) in 1980, and represented by Günther Jansen for a single term. Rolf Olderog regained it for the CDU in 1983, and served as its member until 1998. From 1998 to 2009, it was held by the SPD, during which time it was represented by Antje-Marie Steen until 2002, and then Bettina Hagedorn. Ingo Gädechens of the CDU was elected in 2009, and re-elected in 2013 and 2017. Former member Hagedorn regained the constituency for the SPD in 2021.

Election	Member	Party	%
1976	Karl Carstens	CDU	46.9
1980	Günther Jansen	SPD	48.8
1983	Rolf Olderog	CDU	52.3
1987	Rolf Olderog	CDU	48.5
1990	Rolf Olderog	CDU	50.0
1994	Rolf Olderog	CDU	49.1
1998	Antje-Marie Steen	SPD	48.0
2002	Bettina Hagedorn	SPD	48.5
2005	Bettina Hagedorn	SPD	44.6
2009	Ingo Gädechens	CDU	38.5
2013	Ingo Gädechens	CDU	45.8
2017	Ingo Gädechens	CDU	41.5
2021	Bettina Hagedorn	SPD	33.7
2025	Sabastian Schmidt	CDU	34.8

== Election results ==
=== 2025 election ===
Federal election (2025): Ostholstein – Stormarn-Nord
Notes:	Blue background denotes the winner of the electorate vote. Pink background denotes a candidate elected from their party list. Yellow background denotes an electorate win by a list member, or other incumbent. A ✓ or ✗ denotes status of any incumbent, win or lose respectively.						
Party	Candidate	Votes	%	±%	Party votes	%	±%
CDU	Sabastian Schmidt	52,022	34.8	▲4.4	46,721	31.1	▲6.1
SPD	✗ Bettina Hagedorn	38,071	25.4	▼8.2	29,510	19.7	▼10.3
AfD	Volker Schnurrbusch	25,929	17.3	▲10.5	26,494	17.7	▲10.6
Greens	Annette Granzin	15,636	10.4	▼3.0	19,095	12.7	▼3.0
Left	Susanne Spethmann	8,232	5.5	▲2.6	8,935	6.0	▲3.1
FDP	Tobias Maack	5,422	3.6	▼5.7	7,656	5.1	▼7.6
BSW					4,631	3.1	New
SSW					3,166	2.1	▲0.5
FW	David Gutzeit	2,636	1.8	▼0.1	1,356	0.9	▼0.2
Volt	Fleming Jensen	1,722	1.2	New	1,091	0.7	▲0.5
PARTEI					1,062	0.7	▼0.1
BD					232	0.2	New
MLPD					42	<0.1	0.0
Informal votes		1,118			797		
Total valid votes		149,670			149,991		
Turnout		150,788	83.3	▲5.1			
CDU gain from SPD	Majority	13,951	9.4	N/A			

=== 2021 election ===
Federal election (2021): Ostholstein – Stormarn-Nord
Notes:	Blue background denotes the winner of the electorate vote. Pink background denotes a candidate elected from their party list. Yellow background denotes an electorate win by a list member, or other incumbent. A ✓ or ✗ denotes status of any incumbent, win or lose respectively.						
Party	Candidate	Votes	%	±%	Party votes	%	±%
SPD	Bettina Hagedorn	47,714	33.7	▲2.9	42,520	30.0	▲5.4
CDU	✗ Ingo Gädechens	42,991	30.3	▼11.2	35,564	25.1	▼10.6
Greens	Jakob Brunken	19,025	13.4	▲6.5	22,314	15.7	▲5.9
FDP	Jörg Hansen	13,289	9.4	▲2.1	17,986	12.7	▼0.5
AfD	Uwe Witt	9,647	6.8	▼1.1	10,073	7.1	▼1.5
Left	Susanne Spethmann	4,122	2.9	▼1.5	4,036	2.8	▼3.2
SSW					2,241	1.6	
Tierschutzpartei					1,729	1.2	
FW	David Gutzeit	2,582	1.8	▲1.0	1,603	1.1	▲0.5
dieBasis	Michael Metzig	2,032	1.4		1,691	1.2	
PARTEI					1,104	0.8	▼0.1
Independent	Mergim Schlüter	389	0.3				
Volt					289	0.2	
NPD					198	0.1	▼0.1
Team Todenhöfer					182	0.1	
V-Partei3					111	0.1	
ÖDP					102	0.1	▼0.1
Humanists					88	0.1	
du.					65	0.0	
LKR					29	0.0	
DKP					28	0.0	
MLPD					13	0.0	0.0
Informal votes		1,301			1,126		
Total valid votes		141,791			141,966		
Turnout		143,092	78.1	▲1.9			
SPD gain from CDU	Majority	4,723	3.4				

=== 2017 election ===
Federal election (2017): Ostholstein – Stormarn-Nord
Notes:	Blue background denotes the winner of the electorate vote. Pink background denotes a candidate elected from their party list. Yellow background denotes an electorate win by a list member, or other incumbent. A ✓ or ✗ denotes status of any incumbent, win or lose respectively.						
Party	Candidate	Votes	%	±%	Party votes	%	±%
CDU	✓ Ingo Gädechens	56,996	41.5	▼4.3	48,898	35.6	▼5.5
SPD	Bettina Hagedorn	42,232	30.8	▼6.3	33,764	24.6	▼6.9
AfD	Axel Gehrke	10,790	7.9	▲4.1	11,782	8.6	▲3.6
FDP	Joachim Rinke	10,047	7.3	▲5.0	18,147	13.2	▲7.1
Greens	Jakob Brunken	9,539	6.9	▲1.5	13,493	9.8	▲1.8
Left	Klaus Eickmeyer	6,062	4.4	▲1.0	8,303	6.0	▲1.7
PARTEI					1,205	0.9	
FW	Stephanie Lubnow	1,117	0.8		870	0.6	▲0.1
FAMILIE	Thomas Vollbracht	506	0.4				
BGE					311	0.2	
NPD					301	0.2	▼0.3
ÖDP					179	0.1	
MLPD					42	0.0	0.0
Informal votes		1,150			1,144		
Total valid votes		137,289			137,295		
Turnout		138,439	76.3	▲3.0			
CDU hold	Majority	14,764	10.7	▲2.1			

=== 2013 election ===
Federal election (2013): Ostholstein – Stormarn-Nord
Notes:	Blue background denotes the winner of the electorate vote. Pink background denotes a candidate elected from their party list. Yellow background denotes an electorate win by a list member, or other incumbent. A ✓ or ✗ denotes status of any incumbent, win or lose respectively.						
Party	Candidate	Votes	%	±%	Party votes	%	±%
CDU	✓ Ingo Gädechens	59,783	45.9	▲7.2	53,705	41.2	▲8.4
SPD	Bettina Hagedorn	48,349	37.1	▲2.9	41,134	31.5	▲3.3
Greens	Maria-Elisabeth Fritzen	7,145	5.5	▼2.7	10,490	8.0	▼2.6
AfD	Sven Schmidt	4,897	3.8		6,471	5.0	
Left	Karin Kohlmorgen	4,469	3.4	▼3.0	5,663	4.3	▼2.9
FDP	Bernd Buchholz	2,962	2.3	▼9.0	8,036	6.2	▼11.5
Pirates	Sven Jörns	2,060	1.6		2,111	1.6	0.0
FW					709	0.5	
NPD	Stefan Koch	723	0.6	▼0.4	737	0.6	▼0.4
Tierschutzpartei					917	0.7	
Rentner					489	0.4	▼0.5
MLPD					25	0.0	0.0
Informal votes		1,551			1,452		
Total valid votes		130,388			130,487		
Turnout		131,939	73.3	0.0			
CDU hold	Majority	11,434	8.8	▲4.6			

=== 2009 election ===
Federal election (2009): Ostholstein
Notes:	Blue background denotes the winner of the electorate vote. Pink background denotes a candidate elected from their party list. Yellow background denotes an electorate win by a list member, or other incumbent. A ✓ or ✗ denotes status of any incumbent, win or lose respectively.						
Party	Candidate	Votes	%	±%	Party votes	%	±%
CDU	Ingo Gädechens	49,363	38.6	▼5.0	42,193	32.8	▼5.0
SPD	✗ Bettina Hagedorn	43,765	34.2	▼10.3	36,329	28.2	▼10.6
FDP	Hendrik Gerd Siegel	14,397	11.3	▲7.4	22,701	17.6	▲7.2
Greens	Maria-Elisabeth Fritzen	10,411	8.1	▲5.4	13,651	10.6	▲3.9
Left	Lutz Heilmann	8,235	6.4	▲3.3	9,342	7.3	▲3.1
Pirates					2,062	1.6	
NPD	Marcus Tietz	1,270	1.0	▲0.1	1,192	0.9	0.0
Rentner					1,178	0.9	
Independent	Jan Janssen	433	0.3				
DVU					132	0.1	
MLPD					43	0.0	0.0
Informal votes		4,043			3,094		
Total valid votes		127,874			128,823		
Turnout		131,917	73.3	▼6.0			
CDU gain from SPD	Majority	5,598	4.4				

=== 2005 election ===
Federal election (2005):Ostholstein
Notes:	Blue background denotes the winner of the electorate vote. Pink background denotes a candidate elected from their party list. Yellow background denotes an electorate win by a list member, or other incumbent. A ✓ or ✗ denotes status of any incumbent, win or lose respectively.						
Party	Candidate	Votes	%	±%	Party votes	%	±%
SPD	✓ Ole Schröder	61,947	44.6	▼4.0	53,947	38.8	▼5.2
CDU	Ingo Gädechens	60,608	43.6	▲2.6	52,564	37.8	▼0.5
FDP	Bernd Brandes	5,402	3.9	▼1.3	14,442	10.4	▲2.6
Left	Rainer Mill	4,363	3.1	▲2.2	5,794	4.2	▲3.2
Greens	Maria-Elisabeth Fritzen	4,363	3.1	▲2.2	5,794	4.2	▲3.2
Familie	Thomas Vollbracht	1,716	1.2		1,608	1.2	
NPD	Kay Oelke	1,201	0.9		1,350	1.0	▲0.7
MLPD					65	0.0	
Informal votes		1,930			1,842		
Total valid votes		139,035			139,123		
Turnout		140,965	79.3	▼1.5			
SPD hold	Majority	1,339	1				
