= Friedrich Schmidt =

Friedrich Schmidt may refer to:

- Carl Friedrich Schmidt (geologist) (1832–1908), or Friedrich Schmidt, Baltic German geologist and botanist
- Friedrich August Schmidt (lexicographer) (Georg Friedrich August Schmidt; 1785–1858), German clergyman, bibliographer and lexicographer
- Friedrich August Schmidt (engraver) (1787–1855), German engraver, lithographer and painter
- Friedrich August Schmidt (painter) (1796–1866), German painter and lithographer
- Friedrich Schmidt-Ott (1860–1956), known as Friedrich Schmidt until 1920, German lawyer and science policymaker

== See also ==
- Friedrich von Schmidt (1825–1891), German architect
- Carl Friedrich Schmidt (disambiguation)
