= Brian Schmidt (disambiguation) =

Brian Schmidt (born 1967) is an American-Australian astrophysicist.

Brian or Bryan Schmidt may also refer to:

- Brian L. Schmidt (born 1962), American music composer
- Bryan Schmidt (born 1981), American ice hockey player
- Bryan Schmidt (footballer) (born 1995), Argentine footballer
- Bryan Thomas Schmidt (born 1969), American science fiction author and editor

== See also ==
- Brian Smith (disambiguation)
- Bryan Smith (disambiguation)
- Brian Smyth (disambiguation)
