= Bettina Hagedorn =

German politician

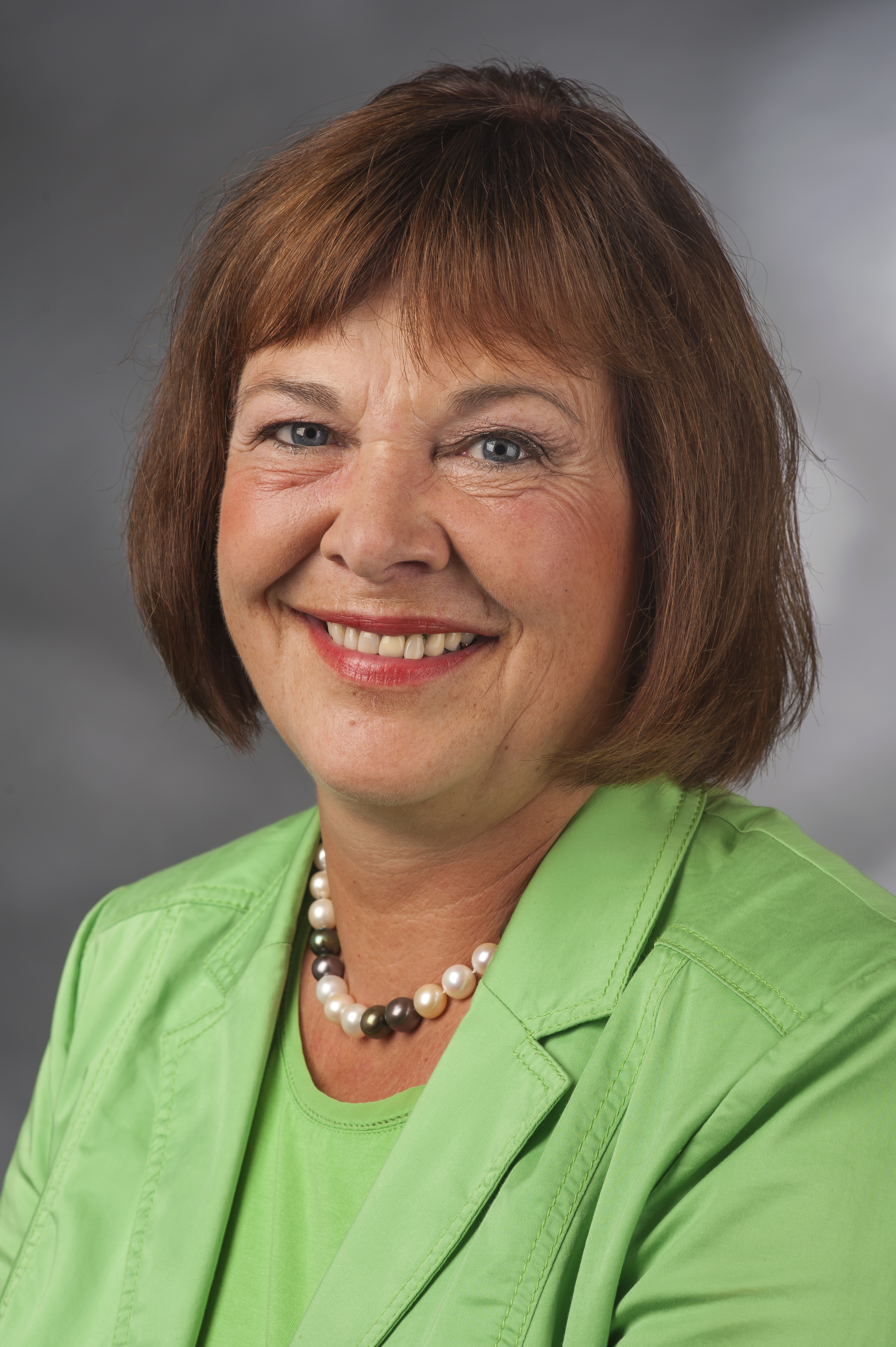
- Hagedorn in 2014

Parliamentary State Secretary for Finance
- In office 14 March 2018 – 8 December 2021 Serving with Christine Lambrecht (2018-2019), Sarah Ryglewski (since 2019)
- Minister: Olaf Scholz
- Preceded by: Michael Meister

Member of the Bundestag for Ostholstein - Stormarn-Nord
- Incumbent
- Assumed office 26 October 2021
- Preceded by: Ingo Gädechens
- Constituency: Ostholstein - Stormarn-Nord

Member of the Bundestag for Schleswig-Holstein
- In office 27 October 2009 – 26 October 2021
- Constituency: State-Wide List

Member of the Bundestag for Ostholstein
- In office 22 September 2002 – 27 October 2009
- Succeeded by: Ingo Gädechens

Personal details
- Born: Bettina Siebmann; 26 December 1955 (age 70) Kiel, West Germany (now Germany)
- Citizenship: German
- Party: SPD

Bettina Hagedorn (née Siebmann, born 26 December 1955) is a German politician of the Social Democratic Party (SPD) who has been serving as a member of the German Bundestag since September 2002, representing Ostholstein - Stormarn-Nord.

In addition, Hagedorn has also served as Parliamentary State Secretary in the Federal Ministry of Finance under minister Olaf Scholz in the fourth coalition government of Chancellor Angela Merkel from 2018 to 2021 and later in the Federal Ministry for the Environment, Climate Action, Nature Conservation and Nuclear Safety under minister Carsten Schneider in the coalition government of Chancellor Friedrich Merz from 2026.

== Early life and education ==
Hagedorn was born in Kiel, but grew up in Laboe. After graduation in 1974 in Preetz, she began studying special education and biology at the University of Hamburg, which she broke off in 1976. Instead, she completed an apprenticeship as a goldsmith in Plön, which she finished in 1980 with a journeyman's certificate.

== Political career ==
=== Career in local politics ===
Since 1983 Hagedorn has been a member of the SPD. From 1991 to 2003, she was a member of the SPD district executive Ostholstein, from 1993 as deputy district chairwoman. From 2003 to 2019 she was a member of the state executive committee of the SPD in Schleswig-Holstein. From 2007 to 2019 she served as deputy state chairwoman of the SPD in Schleswig-Holstein, under the leadership of chairman Ralf Stegner.

From 1986 to 2003 Hagedorn was a member of the municipal council of her place of residence, Kasseedorf, where she also served as a deputy mayor (1994–1997) and mayor (1997–2003).

=== Member of Parliament, 2002–present ===
Since the 2002 national elections Hagedorn has been a member of the German Bundestag. From 2002 until 2018, she served on the Budget Committee, where she was her parliamentary group's rapporteur on the budgets of the Federal Ministry of Family Affairs, Senior Citizens, Women and Youth (2002-2005); the Federal Ministry of the Interior (2005-2009); the Federal Ministry of Labour and Social Affairs (2009-2013); and the Federal Ministry of Transport and Digital Infrastructure (2013-2017).

Throughout that period, Hagedorn also served on the Audit Committee, which she chaired from 2013 until 2017. Both from 2005 to 2009 and from 2013 to 2017, she was a member of the so-called Confidential Committee (Vertrauensgremium) of the Budget Committee, which provides budgetary supervision for Germany’s three intelligence services, BND, BfV and MAD.

In addition to her committee assignments, Hagedorn is a member of the German Parliamentary Friendship Group with the Nordic States. Within her parliamentary group, she has been serving as on the working groups on budgetary policies since 2009 and for municipal policies since 2005. She also belongs to the Parliamentary Left, a left-wing movement.

In 2015, Hagedorn was one of the victims of a large-scale cyberattack on the German Parliament’s computer network.

In the 2017 federal elections, Hagedorn led her party’s list for Schleswig-Holstein. In Chancellor Angela Merkel’s fourth cabinet, she joined the federal government as one of two Parliamentary State Secretaries – alongside Christine Lambrecht (2018-2019), later Sarah Ryglewski (2019–2021) – serving under Finance Minister Olaf Scholz. In this capacity, she participated in the fifth German-Indian government consultations in Delhi in November 2019.

Following the 2021 elections, Hagedorn joined the Budget Committee again, where she has since been serving as her parliamentary group’s rapporteur on the annual budget of the Federal Ministry for Economic Cooperation and Development (2021–2025), the Federal Ministry for the Environment, Climate Action, Nature Conservation and Nuclear Safety (since 2025), the Office of the Federal President (since 2025) as well as on the Special Climate and Transformation Fund (since 2025). In addition to her committee assignments, she is part of the German Parliamentary Friendship Group for Relations with the Baltic States.

In the negotiations to form a Grand Coalition under the leadership of Friedrich Merz's Christian Democrats (CDU together with the Bavarian CSU) and the SPD following the 2025 German elections, Hagedorn was part of the SPD delegation in the working group on public finances, led by Mathias Middelberg, Florian Oßner and Dennis Rohde.

== Other activities ==
=== Corporate boards ===
- GIZ, Member of the Supervisory Board (since 2022)
- Verkehrsinfrastrukturfinanzierungsgesellschaft mbH (VIFG), Member of the Supervisory Board (since 2013)

=== Non-profit organizations ===
- Federal Foundation for the Reappraisal of the SED Dictatorship, Member of the Board of Trustees (since 2018)
- German Federal Environmental Foundation (DBU), Member of the Board of Trustees (2018–2021)
- German Children's Fund (DKHW), Member of the Board (since 2013)
- Friedrich Ebert Foundation (FES), Member
- German Federal Environmental Foundation (DBU), Member of the Board of Trustees (2018–2021)
- Federal Agency for Civic Education, Member of the Board of Trustees (2006–2009)

== Personal life ==
Hagedorn is divorced and has three sons.
