= Alfred Schmidt =

Alfred Schmidt may refer to:

- Alfred Schmidt (architect) (1892-1965), German architect
- Alfred Schmidt (artist) (1858–1938), Danish illustrator and painter
- Alfred Schmidt (philosopher) (1931–2012), German philosopher and sociologist
- Alfred Schmidt (footballer) (1935–2016), German football soccer player
- Alfred Schmidt (water polo) (born 1957), Mexican Olympic water polo player
- Alfred Schmidt (weightlifter) (1898–1972), Estonian weightlifter
