= Smite =

Smite may refer to:

== Geography ==
- Smite River, South Island, New Zealand
- River Smite, Leicestershire and Nottinghamshire, England
- Combe Fields, a parish in Warwickshire, England, previously called Smite

== Other uses ==
- Smite, also known as a dueling scar
- Smite (video game), a 2014 video game
- Šmite, feminine form of the Latvian surname Šmits

== See also ==
- HMS Smiter, a set index article on ships
