= Smitten =

Smitten may refer to:

- Infatuation
- Smitten (The Martinis album), 2004
- Smitten (Buffalo Tom album), 1998
- Smitten (Pale Waves album), 2024

== See also ==
- Smite (disambiguation)
