= Dennis Schmidt =

Dennis Schmidt may refer to:

- Dennis Schmidt (author) (1939–2003), American science fiction and fantasy author
- Dennis Schmidt (footballer) (born 1988), German footballer
- Dennis J. Schmidt (fl. 1980s–2010s), American philosopher

== See also ==
- Dennis Schmid (born 1969), American tennis player
- Dennis Schmitt (born 1946), veteran explorer, adventurer and composer
- Dennis Schmitt (footballer) (born 1993), German footballer
