= Brian Smyth (disambiguation) =

Brian Smyth (born 1967) is an Irish figurative painter.

Brian or Bryan Smyth may also refer to:

- Brian Smyth (Gaelic footballer) (1924–2016), Irish Gaelic footballer and hurler
- Bryan Smyth (born 1963), Irish singer, television presenter and actor
- Bryan Smyth (rugby league), rugby league footballer

== See also ==
- Brian Smith (disambiguation)
- Bryan Smith (disambiguation)
