= Rainer Schmidt =

Rainer Schmidt may refer to:

- Rainer Schmidt (ski jumper) (born 1948), German ski jumper
- Rainer Schmidt (landscape architect) (born 1954), German landscape architect
- Rainer Schmidt (table tennis) (born 1965), German para table tennis player
- Rainer Schmidt (violinist) (born 1964), German violinist
