= Alexander Schmidt =

Alexander Schmidt may refer to:

- Alexander Schmidt (physiologist) (1831–1894), Livonian physiologist
- Alexander Schmidt (politician) (1879–1937), Moldavian politician
- Alexander Schmidt (mathematician) (born 1965), German mathematician
- Alexander Schmidt (football manager) (born 1968), German football manager
- Alexander Schmidt (footballer) (born 1998), Austrian football player
- Alexander M. Schmidt (1930–1991), American physician
