= Gerhard Schmidt =

Gerhard Schmidt may refer to:

- Gerhard Schmidt (biochemist) (1901–1981), biochemist
- Gerhard Schmidt (crystallographer) (1919–1971), organic chemist and chemical crystallographer
- Gerhard Carl Schmidt (1865–1949), German chemist
- Gerhard Schmidt (art historian) (1924–2010), professor of the history of art
- Gerhard Schmidt-Gaden (1937–2026), German choral conductor, and academic teacher
