= Frederick Schmidt (disambiguation) =

Frederick Schmidt may refer to:

- Frederick Schmidt (born 1984), British actor
- Frederick D. Schmidt (1932–2003), American politician
- Frederick W. Schmidt (born 1953), American theologian
- Freddy Schmidt (1916–2012), American baseball player
- Fred Schmidt (born 1943), American swimmer

== See also ==
- Frederik Schmidt (1771–1840), Norwegian politician
- Frederik Pind Schmidt (born 1996), Danish rapper, record producer, and songwriter
