= Carsten Schmidt =

German business person

Carsten Schmidt (born 10 October 1963) is a German business executive. He was the CEO of Sky Deutschland from 2015 to 2019. In 2020, he took over the position as CEO of Bundesliga club, Hertha BSC. In the same year, he was appointed to the Executive Committee of Special Olympics Germany.

== Early life ==
Schmidt was born in October 1963, in Lüneburg, Germany. After graduating from high school in his hometown Winsen, he completed a commercial apprenticeship in Hamburg, and graduated with a business administration degree from the Munich University of Applied Sciences. During this time, Schmidt spent a semester in Toronto, Canada, on a scholarship from the Carl Duisberg Society.

== Career ==
Schmidt began his career in the media industry at Wige Media, at the time one of Europe's leading sports TV production companies, where he headed the marketing and television department as Managing Director.

=== Sky Deutschland ===
Carsten Schmidt joined the media company Sky Deutschland (then Premiere) in 1999 as Head of Sports and was appointed to the Management Board in 2006 as Chief Officer Sports, Advertising Sales & Internet. From June 2015 to December 2019, Schmidt was CEO of Sky Deutschland with responsibilities for the German-speaking markets of Germany, Austria and Switzerland. During 2020 he served as a Senior Advisor to the company.

Under Schmidt's leadership, Sky Deutschland produced its first Sky Originals series, including the award-winning series Babylon Berlin, Das Boot and Der Pass. The company also launched several high-profile campaigns such as the initiative Sky Ocean Rescue, which aims to help protect our oceans by eliminating the use of single-use plastic packaging.

Carsten Schmidt's accomplishments include the launch of Sky Sport News, Germany's first 24-hour sports news channel, and the securing of major sports rights including the UEFA Champions League, the German Bundesliga and Formula 1. Schmidt strengthened Sky's relationship with the German Football League (DFL) and developed new business areas in advertising sales.

=== Hertha Berlin ===
In December 2020, Schmidt took on the role of managing director of Bundesliga club Hertha Berlin. In addition to his overall responsibility as managing director, Schmidt had direct responsibility for marketing, sales, strategy, corporate communications and internationalization. According to press reports, the German Football League (DFL) had planned to bring Schmidt to Frankfurt as CEO in 2021. However, Schmidt saw his future at Hertha Berlin in Berlin. On 12 October 2021, Hertha BSC and Schmidt agreed to terminate his contract with immediate effect for personal reasons.

=== Management advisor ===
Since July 2022, Schmidt has been working as advisor in the fields of media, sports and strategy.

=== Special Olympics ===
Schmidt has been a member of the Executive Committee of Special Olympics Germany since 2020 and serves as Vice President of Marketing, Communication and Digitalisation in an honorary capacity. In this role, he initiated the Special Olympics Media Alliance on the occasion of the Special Olympics World Games Berlin 2023, which received the Horizont Sport Business Award as Medium of the Year.

=== Awards ===
- 2003: Deutscher Fernsehpreis (German Television Award) for the Premiere Bundesliga Konferenz
- 2012: Manager of the Year in the category "Sports business" from Horizont magazine
- 2016: Bayerischer Fernsehpreis "Blauer Panther" (Bavarian Television Award) for the Sky Bundesliga Conference in the category “Entertainment Programs”
- 2017: Entry into the “Hall of Fame Sponsoring” as part of the 24th International Sponsoring Awards of the FASPO
- 2018: GQ Men of the Year Award “TV National” as the boldest TV idea of the year for the Sky Originals “Das Boot”
