= Albert Schmidt =

Albert Schmidt may refer to:

- Albert Schmidt (monk) (born 1949), German Benedictine monk, abbot and theologian
- Albert Schmidt (politician) (1951–2024), German Bundestag member
- Al Schmidt (born c. 1972), American politician
- Albert-Marie Schmidt (1901–1966), French classicist and literary scholar

== See also ==
- Albert Smidt (c. 1847–1890), German-born Australian serial killer
- Al Schmid (1920–1982), United States Marine
