= Thomas Schmidt =

Thomas Schmidt may refer to:

- Thomas Schmidt (canoeist)
- Thomas Schmidt (footballer)
- Thomas Schmidt (politician) (born 1961), German politician
- Thomas S. Schmidt, professor of Ancient Greek
- Princess Poppy (drag queen), the stage name of Thomas Schmidt, American drag performer

== See also ==
- Thomas Lanigan-Schmidt, American artist
- Thomas Schmidt-Kowalski, German composer
