= Sebastian Schmidt =

Sebastian Schmidt may refer to:

- Sebastian Schmidt (luger) (born 1978), German luger
- Sebastian Schmidt (rower) (born 1985), German rower
- Sebastian Schmidt (politician) (born 1993), German politician
