= Bryan Smith =

Bryan Smith may refer to:

- Bryan Smith, driver of a van that hit author Stephen King in 1999
  - Bryan Smith, a character in Stephen King's The Dark Tower based on the driver of the van that hit him
- Bryan Smith (American football) (born 1983), defensive end
- Bryan Smith (footballer) (born 1970), Scottish footballer (soccer) with Clydebank and Clyde
- Bryan Smith (motorcyclist) (born 1983), American motorcycle racer
- Bryan G. Smith (born 1980), American chess grandmaster
- Bryan Smith (West Virginia politician) (born 1974), American politician
- Bryan Smith, Canadian politician, Green Party candidate in Ontario 2003 election
- Bryan Smith, former member of Deep Banana Blackout
- Bryan Smith, presenter for the Australian television series Beyond Tomorrow

== See also ==
- Brian Smith (disambiguation)
- Brian Smyth (disambiguation)
- Bryan Smyth, Irish singer and television presenter
- Bryan Smyth (rugby league), Irish rugby league player
