= Fritz Schmidt =

Fritz Schmidt may refer to:

- Fritz Schmidt (Nazi official) (1903–1943), German Commissioner-General in the Netherlands
- Fritz Schmidt (field hockey) (1943–2024), German field hockey player

== See also ==
- Schmidt (surname)
