= Franz Schmidt (serial killer) =

Austrian serial killer

- Born: 24 February 1930; Weißenkirchen im Attergau, Austria
- Died: 14 May 2017 (aged 87); Wels, Austria
- Judicial status: Deceased
- Convictions: Murder x3 Attempted murder Aggravated theft
- Penalty: Life imprisonment x2

Details
- Victims: 3–4
- Span of crimes: 1957 – 1984 (possibly 1982)
- Country: Austria
- States: Tyrol, Upper Austria
- Date apprehended: 3 August 1984

Franz Schmidt (24 February 1930 – 14 May 2017) was an Austrian serial killer who was twice sentenced to life imprisonment, once for a child murder in 1957 and for a double murder in 1984. Accounting sentences for other convictions up to his release in 2013, he was one of the longest-serving convicts in the country's history.

== Early life and crimes ==
Franz Schmidt was born on 24 February 1930, in Weißenkirchen im Attergau. The first child of an unmarried maid who had had an affair with her employer, he was adopted at an early age and later sent to the Kaiserebersdorf Educational Institution, where he trained as a carpenter. After his release, he moved to Wels, married and had a child.

In 1957, Schmidt was sentenced to life imprisonment by the Innsbruck Regional Court for killing a 14-year-old with a pitchfork handle, in addition to receiving an 8-year sentence for arson and attempted murder of another young woman. During his detainment, he confessed to attacking a 38-year-old woman in Pöham, and after a psychiatric reevaluation, the examining psychiatrist's report attested that he lacked any moral insight and exhibited sadistic tendencies. Nevertheless, on July 22, 1981, Schmidt was paroled for good behaviour, and was given a 10-year probation period.

== Double murder ==
On 14 June 1984, Schmidt broke into a house in Redlham, where he mercilessly stabbed to death 39-year-old Gertrude Reiter and slashed the neck of her 3-year-old daughter, Barbara. Their bodies were found by the head of the family, Franz, who quickly notified the gendarmes. After a few months of gathering evidence and witness testimonies, the police arrested Schmidt on August 3.

While searching through the suspect's house, traces of blood whose blood type matched one of the victims were found on Schmidt's clothing. In addition, it was revealed that he had, among other things, sold two wristwatches he had stolen from the bodies following the murders. With this overwhelming evidence, Schmidt was charged with two counts of murder and aggravated theft, for which he was convicted and sentenced to another life term by the Wels District Court on December 5, 1985.

=== Suspected murder ===
At the time, investigators also suspected that Schmidt might have been the killer of 13-year-old Andreas Pentz, who had been stabbed to death in Edt bei Lambach on 12 September 1982. Similarly to the Reiters, his watch had been stolen, and the crime scene was on a stretch between Schmidt's home address in Wels and family members in Frankenmarkt, whom he often visited on his moped. Despite this, no substantial evidence has ever linked him to the crime, and he has never admitted guilt in it either.

== Release and aftermath ==
After spending more than 53 years behind bars, the 83-year-old Franz Schmidt was released in early 2013 on the basis of positive reports from psychiatrists, as well as his old age and failing health. He was moved to a shared apartment in Wels, Austria, where he was constantly kept under supervision. He died there on 14 May 2017, at the age of 87.

Files related to the Redlham murders are exhibited at the Crime and Gendarmerie Museum at Scharnstein Castle.

== See also ==
- List of serial killers by country
