= Charles Schmidt =

Charles, Charlie, or Chuck Smith could refer to:

- Boss Schmidt (Charles Schmidt, 1880–1932), American professional baseball player
- Charles Schmidt (theologian), French theologian
- Charles J. Schmidt (1907–1966), American politician from Wisconsin
- Charlie Schmidt (politician), American politician from Virginia
- Chuck Schmidt (politician), American politician from Kansas
- Chuck Schmidt (American football), general manager of the Detroit Lions from 1989 to 2000
- Charles Schmidt (cartoonist), American comics artist, known for the comic strip Radio Patrol
- Charlie Schmidt, originator of the Keyboard Cat video

== See also ==
- Charles E. Schmidt College of Medicine, one of the ten academic colleges of Florida Atlantic University in Boca Raton, Florida
- Charles E. Schmidt College of Science, one of the ten academic colleges of Florida Atlantic University in Boca Raton, Florida
