= Gunter Schmidt (disambiguation) =

Gunter, Günter or Gunther Schmidt may refer to:

- Gunter Schmidt (born 1938), German sexologist
- Günter Schmidt (1926–2016), German anarchologist
- Gunther Schmidt (born 1939), German mathematician
