= Jānis Šmits =

Latvian politician and Lutheran pastor (1968–2019)

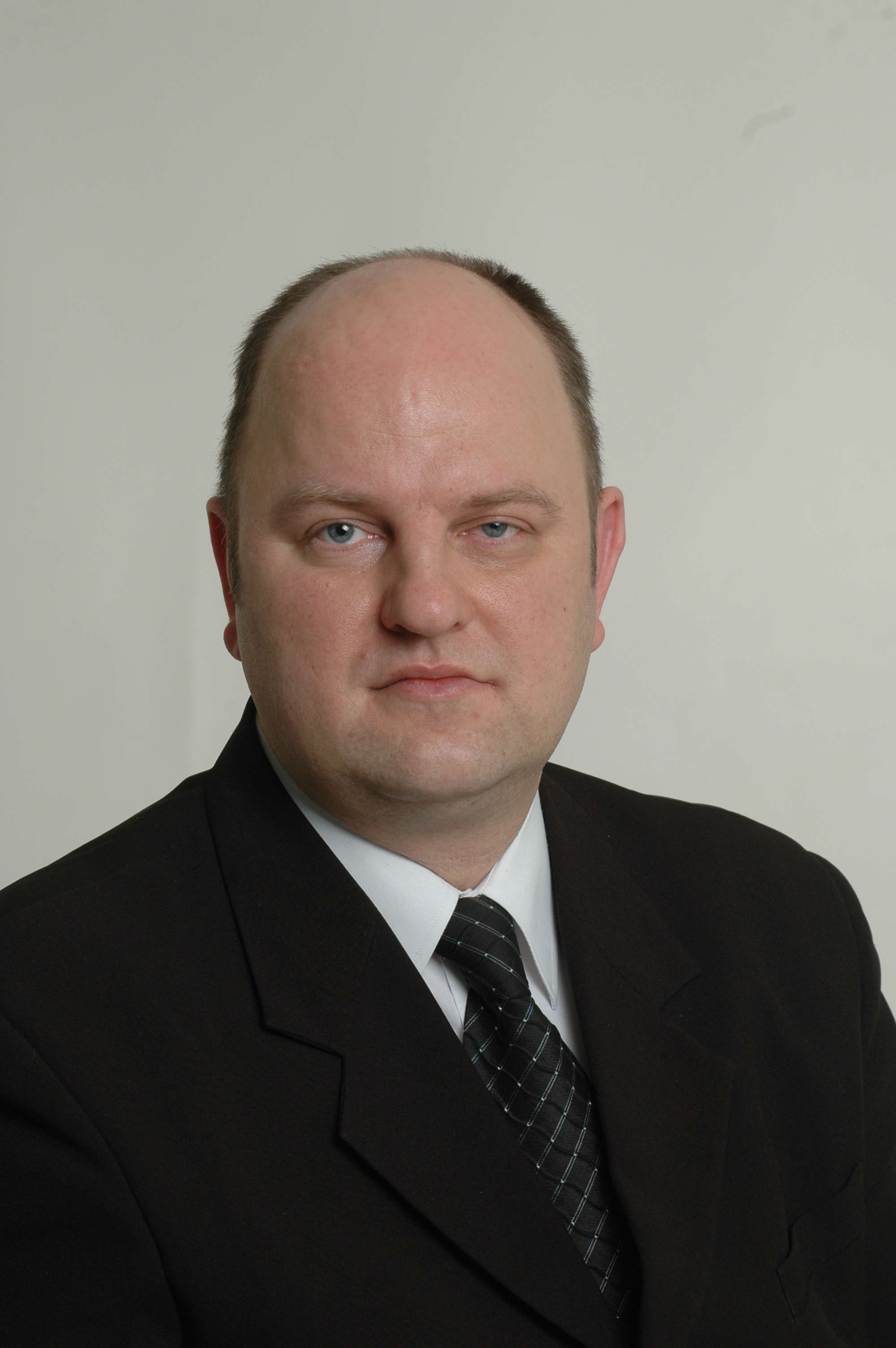
Jānis Šmits

Jānis Šmits (1 April 1968 – 23 September 2019) was a Latvian politician and Lutheran pastor. He was a member of the Latvia's First Party and a deputy of the 8th and 9th Saeima (Latvian Parliament). He was a member of parliament from March 18, 2004 to January 15, 2009. From 2009 he was a member of the Rīga City Council. He was well known for his outspoken conservative stance regarding the defense of Christian values and criticism of homosexuality.

Šmits graduated from the University of Latvia Faculty of Theology in 1997 and subsequently served in a number of Latvian Lutheran churches. From 1994 to 1996 he was one of the military chaplains of the renewed Republic of Latvia Defense Forces. From 1997 to 2004 he was President of the Lutheran Heritage Foundation publishing house.

In 2002 he was one of the initiators in the creation of the LPP. Following the creation of the party he became one of the members of the executive board and advisor to the Deputy Prime Minister on Religious affairs. He was also Secretary to the Council of Religious Affairs and actively promoted the re-establishment of laws regulating church and state relations. In 2004 he became as a member of Parliament, Secretary General of Saeima as well as the Chairman of the National Security Commission. From 2005 to 2006 he was also Chairman of the LPP fraction in Parliament. In 2006 he was again elected as a member of the 9th Saeima, and then elected to serve as Chairman of the Human Rights and Social Affairs Commission. Šmits' election to this post resulted in criticism by many liberal organizations. On January 15, 2009 he lost his seat as a member of Parliament. Since 2009 Šmits has been a member of Rīga City Council and the Chairman of Rīga City Collegium of Christian Congregations.

== Sources ==
- Informācija par deputātu
