= Andreas Schmidt =

Andreas Schmidt may refer to:

- Andreas Schmidt (actor) (1963–2017), German actor and director
- Andreas Schmidt (artist) (born 1967), German photographer, artist and gallerist
- Andreas Schmidt (baritone) (born 1960), German classical bass-baritone
- Andreas Schmidt (footballer) (born 1973), retired German footballer
- Andreas Schmidt (swimmer) (born 1959), German former swimmer
- Andreas Schmidt (jazz pianist) (born 1967), German pianist, composer and arranger
- Andreas Schmidt (politician) (1912-1948), Romanian politician and SS member
