= Friedrich August Schmidt (engraver) =

German engraver, lithographer ans oil painter (1787-1855)

Friedrich August Schmidt (December 1787 - 19 September 1855) was a German engraver, lithographer and oil painter.

== Life ==
He studied in Dresden from 1814 to 1816. He lived in Berlin from 1824, only interrupted by a trip to Italy from 1830 to 1831. He produced landscapes, architectural paintings, engravings, lithographs as well as working as a colourist. From 1814 to 1848 he exhibited at the Academy of Arts in Berlin. He coloured and engraved the series of copperplate engravings (mainly based on Friedrich August Calau's and Johann Hubert Anton Forst's drawings) published in Berlin around 1825 by Baptist Weiss - the series included at least 68 views of Berlin and 7 of Potsdam and two based on Schmidt's own drawings. He died in Berlin.
