= Yanis Smits =

Latvian theologian (1941–2020)

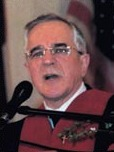
Yanis Smits inauguration address, 2002

Yanis Alfred Smits (Latvian: Jānis Alfreds Šmits; August 9, 1941 – April 23, 2020), commonly known as Bishop Smits, was a Latvian theologian and Baptist pastor. He was persecuted for his political and religious activism against the Soviet rule over Latvia during 1956-1976. His personal story has aroused global interest in the Christian community in his struggle for basic human rights and social justice. He would eventually be elected as Bishop of the Latvian Baptist Union.

== Biography ==
=== Ministry ===
Yanis and Ruth Smits were both born in Riga, Latvia. Life for Christians under a communist regime was not easy. Yanis was baptized in a river at night. He was unable to study theology because of government restrictions, so he studied agriculture. Ruth's father was a pastor and she met Yanis when he attended Bible studies in her parents' home. Yanis began preaching in 1961, but in 1974 Soviet authorities revoked his preaching license because of his evangelistic efforts. Threatened with imprisonment or worse, the family emigrated to Canada in 1977 where Yanis was involved in outreach to Latvians through pastoral ministry and radio. He made numerous visits to Latvia to do evangelism and leadership development. In the mid-1990s he returned to Latvia to serve as the pastor of the historic Salvation Temple in Riga. In the early 2000s he was elected Bishop by the Latvian Baptist Union, whom he served for 2 terms. After the completion of his terms he resigned his pastorate and returned to Canada. He continued his ministry after retiring to Canada, serving as an elder and preacher of the Slavic Evangelical Baptist Church in Niagara Falls until the Lord called him home.
