= Brian David Smith =

English academic

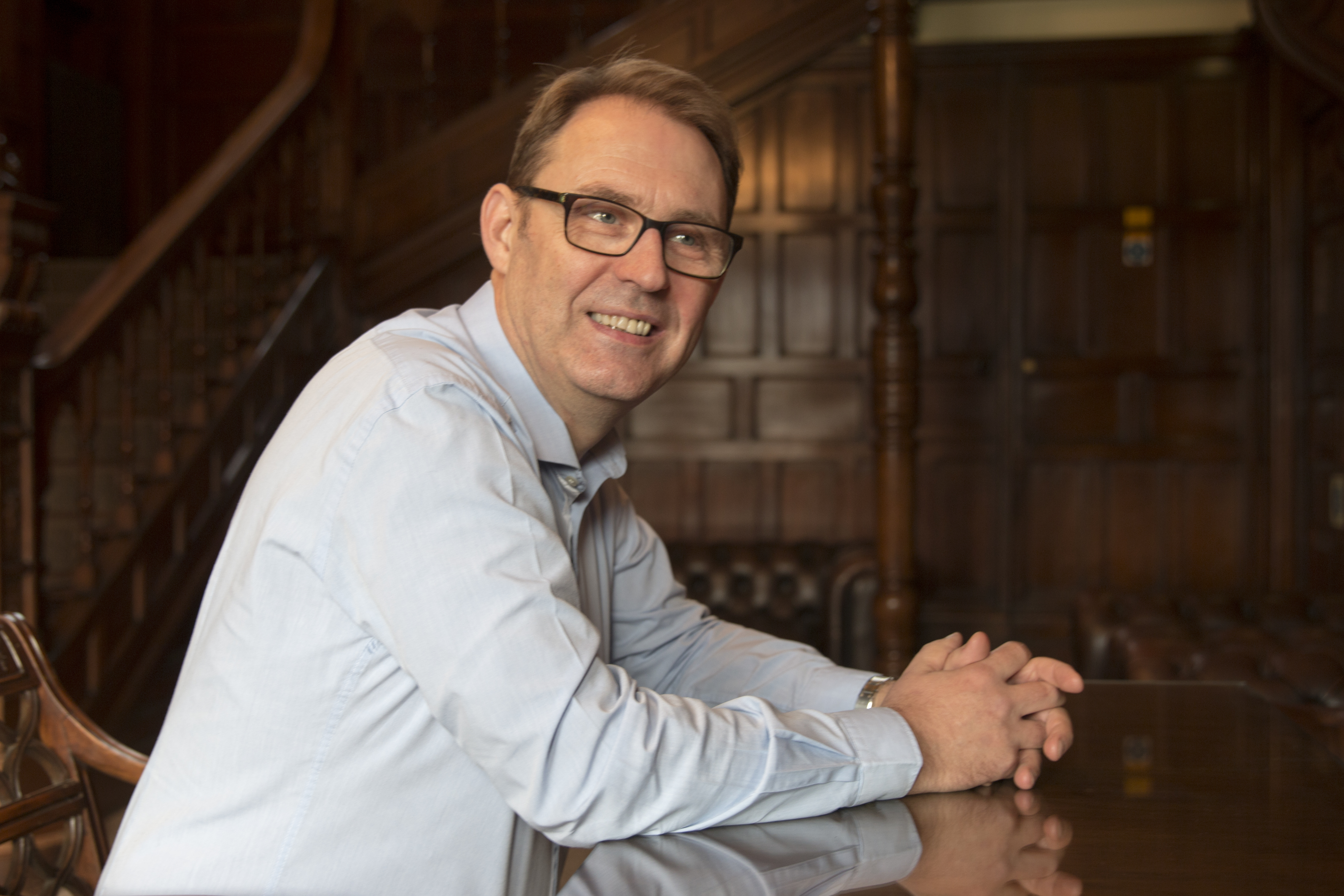

Brian David Smith (born 1961) is a strategic management consultant, academic and author. His particular interests include the evolution of business models and competitive strategies in the life science sector, particularly pharmaceuticals and medical technology. His academic research on these topics informs both his consultancy and writing.

== Life and career ==
=== Early life and education ===
Smith was born in Hebburn in 1961, where he lived until he began his career.

Smith gained a BSc in Chemistry from Newcastle University in 1983 and spent the first years of his career working in pharmaceutical and medical technology companies as a research and development chemist. He then remained in the industry for a further 15 years working in various marketing and strategy roles. He became a qualified marketer in 1989 and served as the first non-academic examiner for the Chartered Institute of Marketing (CIM). Smith was heavily involved in the CIM for almost 30 years and acted as chair of its Levitt Group for senior and qualified marketers.

In 2003, Smith completed his PhD at Cranfield School of Management. His thesis, supervised by Professor Malcolm McDonald, was entitled The Effectiveness of Strategy Making Processes in Medical Markets and addressed the issue of why some life science firms make strong strategy and others do not.

=== Academic career ===
Since 1998, Smith’s academic career has included teaching, research and PhD supervision at several universities.

Since 2011, Smith has been an adjunct professor at Bocconi University in Milan, Italy, where he teaches strategy the MIHMEP programme and research design on the DBA programme. Since 2013, he has also been also a visiting professor at the University of Hertfordshire, where he supervises a group of PhD students focused on the evolution of the life sciences industry. In September 2018, he became a module leader on the Middlesex University Pharmaceutical Industry MBA. In March 2021, he was appointed as an external examiner to UCL’s Bioscience Entrepreneurship MSc.

=== Pragmedic ===
Since 1998, Smith has, through his consultancy firm Pragmedic, advised many life science companies on how they can improve their competitive capabilities. His work focuses on the pragmatic application of strategic management science in the specific market and cultural context of this industry. Using his research into the Darwinian evolution of the industry, he focuses on how firms can adapt to their changing sociological and technological environment.

=== Research and writing ===
Smith’s current research focus is the application of Darwinian Evolution to the business models in the life sciences industry. His work builds on prior work, including his PhD research, concerning the effectiveness of strategy making in life science companies, how firm create market insight and the connection between strategy and commercial outcomes.

This research has led to Smith’s publication of more than 300 articles and papers and 7 books. Smith’s foremost publications include his books Darwin’s Medicine (2017) and The Future of Pharma (2011). Smith was also founding editor for the peer reviewed Journal of Medical Marketing. His own peer reviewed publications include:

- Smith BD. Lessons for CEOs from the consolidation of the medical device and diagnostic industries. International Journal of Medical Marketing 2000;1(2):148-60.
- Rowland K, Smith BD. Achieving a Market Led Culture: A Case Study. International Journal of Medical Marketing 2001;1(3):215-23.
- Smith BD. The Effectiveness of Marketing Strategy Making Processes: A Critical Literature Review and a Research Agenda. Journal of Targeting, Measurement and Analysis for Marketing 2003;2(3):273
- Smith BD. An Empirical Investigation of Marketing Strategy Quality in Medical Markets. International Journal of Medical Marketing 2003;3(2):153-62.
- Smith BD. Success and Failure in Marketing Strategy Making: Results of an Empirical Study Across Medical Markets. International Journal of Medical Marketing 2003;3(4):287-315.
- Smith BD. Making marketing happen: How great medical companies make strategic marketing planning work for them. International Journal of Medical Marketing 2003 Dec;4(2):129-42.
- Smith BD, Wilson HN, Clark M. Creating and Using Customer Insight: 12 Rules of Best Practice. Journal of Medical Marketing 2006;6(2):135-9.
- Smith BD, Awopetu B. Mind Set and Market Segmentation in Pharmaceutical Industry: An Assessment of Practice in the UK. Journal of Pharmaceutical Marketing and Management 2007;17(3/4).
- Wilson H, Clark M, Smith B. Justifying CRM projects in a business-to-business context: The potential of the Benefits Dependency Network. Industrial Marketing Management 2007 Aug;36(6):770-83
- Smith BD. Myth, reality and requirements in pharmaceutical Key Account Management. Journal of Medical Marketing 2009;9(2):89-95.
- Smith BD. An Exploratory Study of Key Opinion Leadership Management Trends amongst European Pharmaceutical Companies. Journal of Medical Marketing 2009;9(4).
- Smith BD. Maybe I Will, Maybe I Won't: What the Connected Perspectives of Motivation Theory and Organisational Commitment May Contribute to our Understanding of Strategy Implementation. Journal of Strategic Marketing 2009;17(6):469-81.
- Smith BD, Turf Wars: What the Intraorganisational Conflict Literature May Contribute to our Understanding of Marketing Strategy Implementation. Journal of Strategic Marketing 2011; 19(1): 25-42
- Smith, BD, Excellence in Market Access Strategy: A Research Based Definition and Diagnostic Tool. Journal of Medical Marketing 2012, 12(4) 259-266
- Smith, BD; Tarricone, R; Vella, V; The Role of Product Life Cycle in Medical Technology Innovation. Journal of Medical Marketing, 15 (1) January 2013
- Smith, BD. Capturing an Elusive Phenomenon: Developing and Testing a Multiple Perspective Model of Marketing Strategy Implementation. Journal of Strategic Marketing. 21 (5) August 2013
- Smith, BD. Between Saying and Doing Lies the Ocean: An Empirical Exploration of the Gap between Strategic Marketing Plans and their Implementation in the Life Sciences Industry. Journal of Strategic Marketing, October 2017 DOI 10.1080/0965254X.2017.1384041 January 2019
- Smith, BD. Does Generalised Darwinism Explain Leadership Behaviours? An Exploratory Study of Life Sciences Firms (accepted International Journal of Healthcare and Pharmaceutical Management, 2021)
