= Johannes Schmidt =

Johannes Schmidt may refer to:

- Johannes Schmidt (linguist) (1843–1901), German linguist
- Johannes Schmidt (biologist) (1877–1933), Danish biologist
- Johannes Schmidt (SS) (1908–1976), German Sturmbannführer
- Johannes V. Schmidt, German pianist and composer

== See also ==
- Johann Schmidt (disambiguation)
