= Kalējs =

Origin
- Origin: Latvian
- Meaning: "blacksmith"

Kalējs (feminine: Kalēja) is a Latvian occupational surname, derived from the Latvian word for "blacksmith". Individuals with the surname include:

- Aivars Kalējs (born 1951), Latvian composer, organist and pianist
- Konrāds Kalējs (1913–2001), a Latvian soldier and a Nazi collaborator
- Jānis Kalējs (born 1965), a Latvian film director
