= Markus Schmidt =

Markus Schmidt may refer to:

- Markus Schmidt (luger) (born 1968), Austrian luger
- Markus Schmidt (referee) (born 1973), German referee
- Markus Schmidt (footballer) (born 1977), Austrian footballer
