= Otto Schmidt (disambiguation) =

Otto Schmidt (1891–1956) was a Soviet scientist, mathematician, astronomer, geophysicist, statesman, academician, and hero of the USSR.

Otto Schmidt may also refer to:

== People ==
- Otto Schmidt (aviator) (1885–1944), German World War I flying ace
- Otto Schmidt (CDU) (1902–1984), German politician
- Otto Schmidt (tennis), Hungarian tennis player
- Otto Diller Schmidt (1884–1963), American Medal of Honor recipient
- Joe Schmidt (ice hockey) (1926–2000), known as Otto, Canadian professional ice hockey player

== Other uses ==
- Otto Schmidt (ship)
