= WIGE =

German television production company

WIGE Media is a German TV production company in Cologne, Germany. The main focus of WIGE lies in amateur football and motorsports, but also includes noteworthy projects in handball, basketball, volleyball, ice hockey and field hockey. The services provided by WIGE Media include Timekeeping, TV production and postproduction with both ENG and OB-facilities, a sports video archive as well as event services and marketing of television broadcast rights.

One of the key elements of the WIGE Media service portfolio is the production of motor sports events on German (and neighbouring countries') race tracks. In this capacity, WIGE produced the Formula One World Feed from the Nürburgring, Hockenheimring and Hungary's Hungaroring before Formula One Management centralized the production of the World Feed in 2007. Nevertheless, WIGE still remains a close involvement in Formula One. They provide German broadcaster RTL Television with additional services for their Formula One coverage, and also assist Formula One Management in some European races.
