= Alexander Schmidt (mathematician) =

German mathematician

- Born: 5 December 1965 (age 60); Berlin
- Education: University of Heidelberg
- Scientific career
- Fields: Mathematics
- Workplaces: University of Heidelberg
- Thesis: Positiv verzweigte Erweiterungen algebraischer Zahlkörper (1993)
- Doctoral advisor: Kay Wingberg
- Website: https://www.mathi.uni-heidelberg.de/~schmidt/

Alexander Schmidt (born 1965) is a German mathematician at the University of Heidelberg. His research interests include algebraic number theory and algebraic geometry.

== Life ==
Schmidt attended the Heinrich-Hertz-Gymnasium in East Berlin, a special school for mathematics. In 1984 he received the bronze medal at the International Mathematical Olympiad in Prague. He studied mathematics at the Humboldt University in Berlin and was awarded the diploma in 1991. In 1993, he obtained his PhD at the University of Heidelberg by Kay Wingberg (Positive branched extensions of algebraic number fields). He then was a research assistant and later an assistant at the chair of Prof. Wingberg. He was also a Heisenberg fellow from 2002 to 2004. In 2000, he habilitated at the University of Heidelberg (with a thesis on the connection between algebraic cycle theory and higher-dimensional class field theory), was a private lecturer there, 2001 chair at the University of Cologne, and in 2004 became a professor at the University of Regensburg and is now a professor at the University of Heidelberg.

== Publications ==
- Einführung in die Algebraische Zahlentheorie, Springer 2007
- with Kay Wingberg and Jürgen Neukirch Cohomology of number fields. Springer 2000, second edition 2008, ISBN 978-3-540-37888-4
- Editor of the new edition of Jürgen Neukirch's Klassenkörpertheorie, Springer 2011 ISBN 978-3-642-17324-0
- Editor of Jürgen Neukirch's Class Field Theory - The Bonn Lectures, Springer Verlag 2011 ISBN 978-3-642-17324-0
