= Walter Schmidt =

Walter Schmidt may refer to:

- Walter Schmidt (baseball)
- Walter Schmidt (footballer)
- Walter Schmidt (hammer thrower)
- Walter Schmidt (minister), fourth Chief Apostle of the New Apostolic Church
- Walter Schmidt (Wisconsin politician) (1898–1987)
