= Carl Friedrich Schmidt =

Carl Friedrich Schmidt may refer to:

- Carl Friedrich Schmidt (artist) (1811–1890), German botanical artist and lithographer
- Carl Friedrich Schmidt (geologist) (1832–1908), Baltic German geologist and botanist

== See also ==
- Carl Friedrich Schmid (1840–1897), Baltic German chess player
- Carl Schmidt (disambiguation)
- Friedrich Schmidt (disambiguation)
