= Franz Schmidt (executioner) =

German executioner (1555–1634)

Franz Schmidt (or Frantz Schmidt)
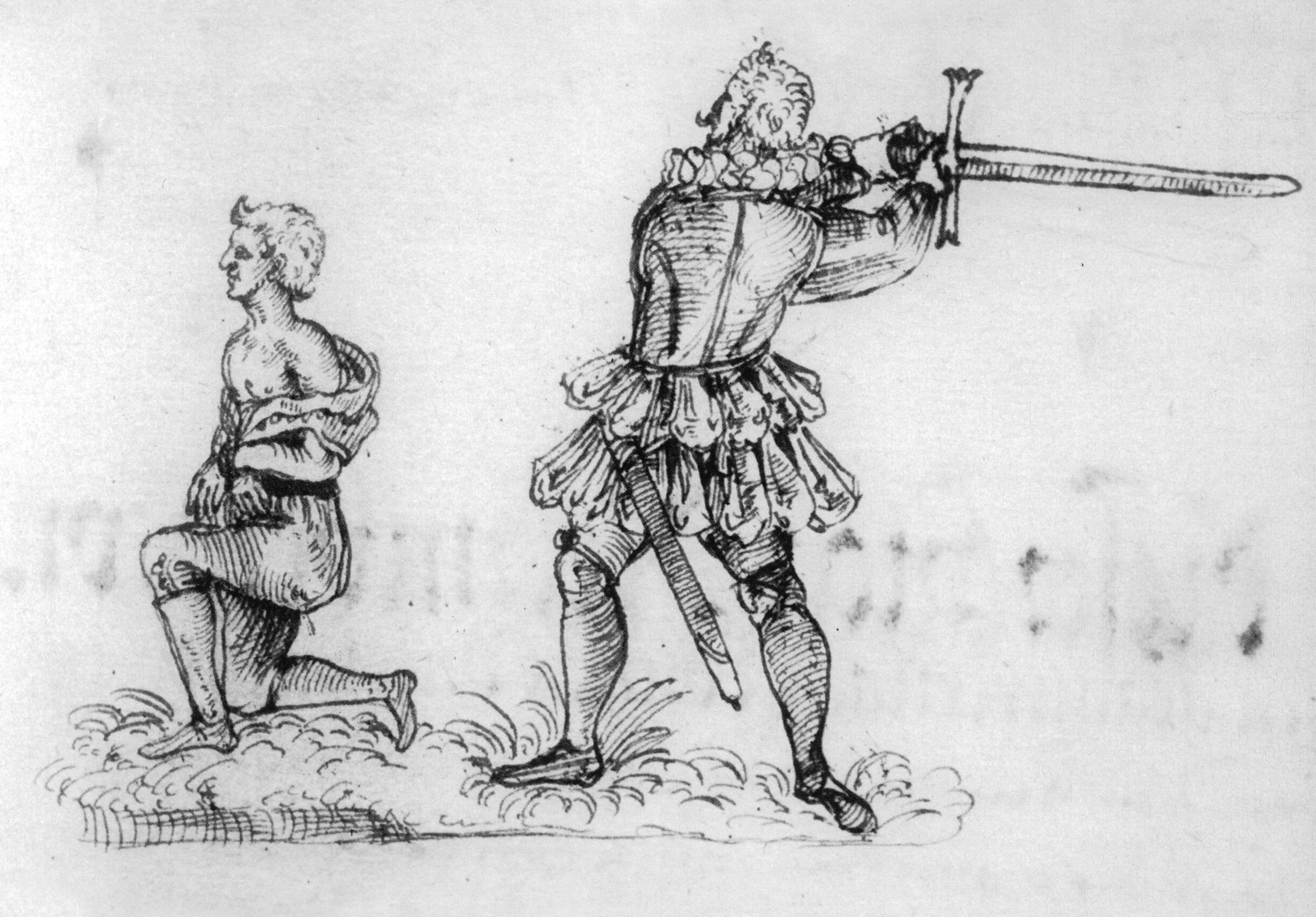
- Franz Schmidt executing Hans Fröschel on May 18, 1591. This drawing is in the margins of a court record.
- Born: 1554; Hof, Franconia, Duchy of Bavaria, present-day Hof, Bavaria, Germany
- Died: 1634 (aged 79)
- Other names: Meister Schmidt
- Occupations: Executioner, torturer, healer
- Known for: Executioner for the Free Imperial City of Nuremberg (1 May 1578-1617). A Hangman's Diary: The Journal of Master Franz Schmidt, Public Executioner of Nuremberg, 1573–1617
- Spouse: Maria Schmidt
- Children: 7
- Parent: Heinrich Schmidt

Franz Schmidt (1555–1634), also known as Meister Franz or Frantz Schmidt, was an executioner in Hof from 1573 to April 1578, and from 1 May 1578 till the end of 1617 he was the executioner of Nuremberg. He left a diary in which he detailed the 361 executions he performed during his 45-year career.

== Personal and professional life ==
Franz Schmidt's father, Heinrich, was originally a woodsman in the north-eastern Bavarian town Hof. Once, when the notoriously tyrannical margrave of Brandenburg-Kulmbach, Albrecht II (r. 1527–1553), wanted three men hanged, he picked out Heinrich from the crowd and forced him to perform the execution, after which he had no option but to continue in the profession of executioner.

Franz Schmidt was probably born in 1555, and was about 18 years old when he became executioner under his father's supervision in Bamberg in 1573. Five years later, in 1578, he secured the post as executioner in Nürnberg. He married the chief executioner's daughter Maria Beck, and eventually became chief executioner after his father-in-law. He fathered seven children, and his salary, on par with the city's wealthiest jurists, allowed him to have a spacious residence in Nürnberg. After his retirement in 1617, he began a new, lucrative career as a medical consultant and subsequently received an imperial privilege by Ferdinand II making him "ehrlich", i.e. an honourable member of society, and thus removing the stain of social stigma from his previous occupation. He was given a lavish funeral in 1634, in one of Nürnberg's prominent cemeteries. The grave is still present today.

Throughout his career as an executioner, Franz Schmidt also had a side job as a healer. According to Joel Harrington, a historian who authored an account of his life, Schmidt's own estimate of patients seeking medical advice amounted to some 15,000 consultations.

== Social position of an executioner ==
The societal position of the professional executioner was ambiguous, as Harrington explains

Legally empowered to torture, maim, and kill suspected or convicted criminals, the professional executioner is one of the more evocative and charged symbols of pre-modern Europe's otherness. A ubiquitous and integral part of the European social fabric well into the modern era, these human "weapons of justice" were simultaneously viewed with suspicion and disdain by the very communities they served, formally marginalized as members of the "dishonourable trades", a delimited menagerie that included slaughterhouse workers and gravediggers. And yet "Meister Franz", as he was popularly, endearingly known, remained a revered member of the local establishment, widely respected for his piety and steadfastness.

Furthermore,

Schmidt's life, in virtually every aspect, had been a great social success, although the dishonourable nature of his profession consistently precluded his open participation in patrician and craftsmen circles alike, placing him and his family in a unique kind of social limbo.

== Significance of diary ==
His journal of punishments he executed survives, and contains accounts of 361 executions and 345 minor punishments (floggings and ear or finger amputations). The individual entries contain date, place, and method of execution, name, origin, and station in life of the condemned and – in later years more verbose than in the earlier ones – details of the crimes on which the sentence was based.

Schmidt executed criminals by rope, sword, breaking wheel, burning, and drowning. The wheel was reserved for severely violent criminals. Burnings (for homosexual intercourse and counterfeiting money) occurred only twice in his whole career, and drowning – prescribed by the Carolina for a woman committing infanticide – was commuted regularly in the Nuremberg of Schmidt's time into execution by sword, partly upon the intervention of Schmidt and some clergy.

Schmidt's journal is unique as a source of social history and history of law. The autograph no longer exists, but – according to the preface of a modern edition – libraries at Nuremberg and Bamberg owned, as late as 1913, four handwritten copies made between the 17th and the start of the 19th century. The first printed edition appeared in 1801.
