= Burghart Schmidt (historian) =

German historian

- Born: March 1, 1962 (age 64)
- Occupation: historian

Burghart Schmidt (born March 1, 1962, Hamburg) is a German historian. Vice-President of the University of Montpellier III.

== Education ==
Burghart Schmidt went to school in Bremen. From 1982 to 1987, he completed studies of History, Geography and Philosophy at the University of Bordeaux (France).

== Career ==
Doctorate Studies at the University of Hamburg; 1998 dissertation about Hamburg during the French Revolution and Napoleon I of France. From 1998, he taught successively at the University of Hamburg and the Helmut Schmidt University (Universität der Bundeswehr) in Hamburg. 2000 research studies on European History, History of witchcraft and witch-hunts in Northern Germany in the Early Modern Period. 2001 Founder of the Research Association on the History of Crime, Sorcery and Witch-hunts in Northern Germany, 2004 postdoctoral lecture qualification, scientific studies on Ludwig Bechstein and the perception of his work in the 19th century. 2004-2006 invited professor at the Michel de Montaigne University Bordeaux 3 and the University of Southern Brittany. 2006 appointed to professorship of Modern History at the University of Montpellier III; 2008 nominated as Vice-President of the University Paul-Valéry, Montpellier. Currently member of the Research Centre of Interdisciplinary Studies in Montpellier CRISES. 2009 reception of the Palmes académiques; French Order of Chivalry given to academics.

== Selected works ==
- Hamburg im Zeitalter der Französischen Revolution und Napoleons 1789-1813], 2 Bde., Hamburg, 1998 (ISBN 3-923356-87-0)
- Realität und Mythos. Hexenverfolgung in der Frühen Neuzeit] (hg. mit Katrin Möller), Hamburg 2003 (ISBN 3-934632-04-1)
- Frühneuzeitliche Widerstandsbewegungen norddeutscher Unterschichten im Spannungsfeld von Krieg, Okkupation und Fremdherrschaft], Hamburg 2004, (ISBN 3-934632-07-6)
- Les relations entre la France et les villes hanséatiques de Hambourg, Brême et Lübeck (Moyen-Âge – XIXe siècle)] (hg. mit Isabelle Richefort), Brüssel 2006, (ISBN 90-5201-286-5) (französisch)
- Menschenbilder-Menschenrechte von der Antike bis zur Gegenwart], Hamburg 2006 (ISBN 3-934632-10-6)
- Mittelständische Wirtschaft, Handwerk und Kultur im baltischen Raum], Hamburg 2006 (ISBN 3-934632-13-0)
- Bordeaux – Hamburg. Zwei Städte und ihre Geschichte] (hg. mit Bernard Lachaise), Hamburg 2007 (ISBN 3-934632-20-3)
- Mehrdimensionale Arbeitswelten im baltischen Raum. Von der Geschichte zur Gegenwart und Zukunft] (hg. mit Jürgen Hogeforster), Hamburg 2007 (ISBN 3-934632-22-X)
- Wissenstransfer und Innovationen rund um das Mare Balticum. Von der Geschichte zur Gegenwart und Zukunft], Hamburg 2007 (ISBN 3-934632-26-2)
- Hexen, Hexenverfolgung und magische Vorstellungswelten im modernen Afrika - Witches, witch-hunts and magical imaginaries in modern Africa] (hg. mit Rolf Schulte), Hamburg 2008 (ISBN 3-934632-15-7)
