= Johann Schmidt =

Johann Schmidt may refer to:

- Johann Adam Schmidt (1759–1809), German-Austrian surgeon and ophthalmologist
- Johann Anton Schmidt (1823–1905), German botanist
- Johann Friedrich Julius Schmidt (1825–1884), German astronomer and geophysicist
- Johann Georg Schmidt (painter) (1685–1748), German painter
- Johann Georg Schmidt (engraver) (1694–1767), German engraver
- Johann George Schmidt (1707–1774), German master builder, architect in Dresden
- Johann Caspar Schmidt (1806–1856), the full name of Max Stirner, German philosopher
- Johann Schmidt a.k.a. Red Skull, a Marvel Comics supervillain
- Johann Schmidt (historian) (1693–1762), Moravian historian at Palacký University, Olomouc
- Johann Schmidt (neurologist), physician recognized for early research in neurology after Marc Dax
- Johann Schmidt (organist), organist who instructed Johann Peter Kellner in 1720

== See also ==
- Johan Schmidt (born 1964), Belgian pianist
- Johannes Schmidt (disambiguation)
- John Smith (disambiguation)
