= Friedrich August Schmidt (painter) =

Friedrich August Schmidt (17 July 1795 or 1796 – 5 January 1866) was a German lithographer, portrait painter and porcelain designer.

== Life ==
Friedrich August Schmidt had direct access to the court of the Kingdom of Hanover, with his portraits including one of Crown Prince George, the future George V of Hanover.

== Known works ==
=== Berlin ===
- 1837: Major City View from Unter den Linden Street in Berlin, a view from the Alte Wache over the Zeughaus, the Schlossbrücke, the Alte Museum and the Dom; oil on paper, 78 cm × 136 cm

== Bibliography (in German) ==
- Helmut Plath: Hannover im Bild der Jahrhunderte, 3., erweiterte und verbesserte Auflage, Hannover: Verlagsgesellschaft Madsack & Co., 1966, S. 18–23, 105f.
- Bernhard Dörries, Helmut Plath (Hrsg.): Alt-Hannover 1500–1900 / Die Geschichte einer Stadt in zeitgenössischen Bildern von 1500–1900. vierte, verbesserte Auflage, Heinrich Feesche Verlag Hannover, 1977, ISBN 3-87223-024-7, S. 46, 58, 89, 136ff. insbesondere S. 141.
