= Alfred Schmidt (water polo) =

Mexican water polo player (born 1957)

Personal information
- Nationality: Mexican
- Born: 16 September 1957 (age 67)

Sport
- Sport: Water polo

Alfred Schmidt (born 16 September 1957) is a Mexican water polo player. He competed in the men's tournament at the 1976 Summer Olympics.
