= Smite River =

Coordinates: 43°24′S 171°10′E

Location
- Country: New Zealand

Physical characteristics
- Source
  - location: Taylor Range
- Mouth
  - location: Lake Stream
- Length: 5 km (3.1 mi)

The Smite River is a river of the Canterbury region of New Zealand's South Island. It flows west from the Taylor Range to feed Lake Stream, the outflow of Lake Heron, which is an upper part of the Rakaia River system.

== See also ==
- List of rivers of New Zealand
