= Roger Schmidt =

Roger Schmidt may refer to:

- Roger Schmidt (academic) (1931–2018), American theologian and academic
- Roger Schmidt (footballer) (born 1967), German football manager and former player

== See also ==
- Rodger Gustaf Schmidt (born 1952), Canadian–German curler
