= Gerhard Carl Schmidt =

German chemist (1865–1949)

- Born: 5 July 1865; London, United Kingdom
- Died: 16 October 1949 (aged 84); Münster Germany
- Education: University of Basel
- Known for: discovery of radioactivity in Thorium
- Scientific career
- Fields: chemistry
- Doctoral advisor: Georg Wilhelm August Kahlbaum
- Other academic advisors: Eilhard Wiedemann

Gerhard Carl Schmidt (5 July 1865 – 16 October 1949) was a German chemist.

== Life ==
Schmidt was born in London to German parents. He studied chemistry and in 1890 received his PhD for work with Georg Wilhelm August Kahlbaum. In 1898, two months before Marie Curie, Schmidt discovered that thorium is radioactive. Schmidt died of a stroke in Münster 16 October 1949.

== See also ==
- List of multiple discoveries
