= Dennis J. Schmidt =

American philosopher

Education
- Thesis: Between Hegel and Heidegger: An Essay on Dialectic and Difference (1980)
- Doctoral advisor: Jacques Taminiaux

Philosophical work
- Era: Contemporary philosophy
- Region: Western philosophy
- School: Continental
- Main interests: Hermeneutics; Ancient Greek Philosophy; Literary Criticism

Dennis Joseph Schmidt is an American philosopher living in Sydney, Australia where he is Research Professor and chair at Western Sydney University. Prior to moving to Sydney in 2015, he taught at Binghamton University (1982–1994), Villanova University (1994–2003), and Penn State University (2003–2015). He is known for his research on ancient Greek philosophy and literature, post-Kantian philosophy, hermeneutics and philosophy of art. He received his PhD in philosophy from the Boston College in 1982.

Dennis was a known friend and student to Hans-Georg Gadamer for several years. Dennis Schmidt lives with his wife, Jennifer Mensch (who also teaches at Western Sydney University and is the author of 'Kant's Organicism') and his child Zoe Schmidt.

Schmidt is the editor of "SUNY Press Series in Contemporary Continental Philosophy" which has published a number of important works in the contemporary Continental tradition. In addition to his own publications Schmidt has substantially revised and edited Joan Stambaugh's 1995 translation of Martin Heidegger's Being and Time (1927).

== Bibliography ==
- Schmidt, D. (2014), 'Idiome der Wahrheit', : Vittorio Klostermann 9783465042273.
- Schmidt, D. (2012), 'Between Word and Image: Heidegger, Klee, and Gadamer on Gesture and Genesis', : Indiana University Press 9780253006189.
- On Germans and Other Greeks: Tragedy and Ethical Life (Indiana University Press, 2001)
- The Ubiquity of the Finite: Hegel, Heidegger and the Entitlements of Philosophy, MIT Press: Cambridge, Massachusettsm, 1988
- The Difficulties of Ethical Life, Fordham UP, 2008. Co-edited with Shannon Sullivan
- Lyrical and Ethical Subjects (SUNY Press, 2005)
- Hermeneutische Wege (co-edited with Günter Figal, Mohr-Siebeck Verlag, 2000)

== See also ==
- German philosophy
