= Alfred Schmidt (architect) =

German architect (1892–1965)

- Born: 22 April 1892
- Died: 16 November 1965 (aged 73)
- Occupation: Architect

Alfred Schmidt (22 April 1892 – 16 November 1965) was a German architect.
