= Torsten Schmidt =

Torsten Schmidt may refer to:

- Torsten Schmidt (athlete) (born 1974), German discus thrower
- Torsten Schmidt (cyclist) (born 1972), German cyclist
- Torsten Schmidt (officer) (1899–1996), Swedish officer
