= Daniel Schmidt =

Daniel Schmidt may refer to:

- Dan Schmidt (born 1954), American politician
- Daniel Schmidt (baseball) (born 1988), Australian baseball pitcher
- Daniel Schmidt (footballer) (born 1992), Japanese footballer
- Daniel Schmidt (gymnast) (born 1991), German trampoline gymnast
- Daniel Schmidt (musician) (born 1942), composer and builder of American gamelan
- Danny Schmidt (born 1970), American singer-songwriter
- Danny Schmidt (footballer) (born 2003), German footballer

== See also ==
- Daniel Schmid (1941–2006), Swiss theatre and film director
- Daniel Schmid (bobsledder) (born 1976), Swiss bobsledder
- Dan Schmid (born 1962), American musician
