= Frederick W. Schmidt =

American theologian (born 1953)

Frederick W. Schmidt (born June 20, 1953) is an American theologian and Episcopal priest. He is a senior scholar and the inaugural holder of the Rueben P. Job Chair in Spiritual Formation at Garrett-Evangelical Theological Seminary. He serves as vice rector of Church of the Good Shepherd in Brentwood, Tennessee, and he blogs at Patheos.

Schmidt studied at Asbury University (B.A., 1975), Asbury Theological Seminary (M.Div., 1978), and the University of Oxford (D. Phil., 1996), where he worked under the supervision of George B. Caird, Robert Morgan, and E.P. Sanders. He was a teaching fellow in New Testament Greek at Asbury Theological Seminary from 1978 to 1980. He served as an instructor in New Testament studies for the Theology Faculty at Oxford University and tutor at Keble College, Oxford, in 1986. He taught at Messiah College, Grantham, Pennsylvania, from 1987 to 1994. He was dean of St. George's College, Jerusalem, and residentiary canon of St. George's Cathedral from 1994 to 1995; a fellow of the American Council on Education and special assistant to the president and provost of La Salle University in Philadelphia, Pennsylvania, from 1995 to 1996; canon educator, director of programs in spirituality and religious education, and acting program director at Washington National Cathedral from 1997 to 2000; and director of spiritual formation and Anglican studies as well associate professor of Christian spirituality at Perkins School of Theology. Schmidt served as the Rueben P. Job Chair in Spiritual Formation at Garrett-Evangelical Theological Seminary in Evanston, Illinois, from 2012 to 2020.

He was previously a minister in the United Methodist Church before being ordained as a priest in the Episcopal Church in 1993 in the Diocese of Central Pennsylvania. He served as an assisting priest at St. Andrews, Harrisburg, Pennsylvania (1993-1994); All Saints, Hershey, Pennsylvania (1995-1996); as a transition consultant at St. Luke's, Dallas, Texas, (2003-2004); as a teaching associate at Church of the Incarnation (2004-2008); as an assisting priest at St. Barnabas Episcopal Church in Glen Ellyn, Illinois (2016-2019); and assumed his responsibilities as vice rector at Good Shepherd, Brentwood, Tennessee, in 2020. He also served on the Board of Examining Chaplains for the Episcopal Church from 2003 to 2015.

In addition to his work in the church and the academy, Schmidt has maintained an active interest in patient safety and the ethical issues associated with human trials. He served as a member of the Institutional Review Board of the National Heart, Lung, and Blood Institute, at the National Institutes of Health (1998-2000); as a member of the Data Safety Monitoring Board for Stroke Prevention in Patients with Sickle Cell Anemia (2000-2004); as a member of the Pulmonary Data and Safety Monitoring Board (2000-2014); and as a patient safety consultant on a Data Safety Monitoring Board for Allergan, Inc., from 2006 to 2016.

Schmidt has written A Still Small Voice: Women, Ordination and the Church (Syracuse University Press, 1998), The Changing Face of God (Morehouse, 2000), When Suffering Persists (Morehouse, 2001; Italian translation: Sofferenza, All ricerca di una riposta. Torino: Claudiana, 2004), What God Wants for Your Life (Harper, 2005), Conversations with Scripture: Revelation (Morehouse, 2005), Conversations with Scripture: Luke (Morehouse, 2009), and The Dave Test: A Raw Look at Real Life in Hard Times (Abingdon Press, 2013). He contributed multiple entries to The Anchor Bible Dictionary (Doubleday, 1992) and an article on theological education in Canonical Theism, edited by William J. Abraham, Natalie Van Kirk and Jason Vickers (Eerdmans, 2008). He was the editor of The Changing Face of God (Morehouse, 2000) and series editor of Conversations with Scripture (Morehouse). He has written multiple articles, which appear in the Scottish Journal of Theology, Feminist Theology, The Heythrop Journal, Congregations, Ministry Matters, Journal for Preachers, Time, Presence, and The American Baptist Quarterly, among others. He has written over 500 articles at Patheos and still others as a guest writer on other sites.
