= Arthur Schmidt =

Arthur Schmidt may refer to:

- Arthur Schmidt (film editor) (1937–2023), American film editor
- Arthur Schmidt (general) (1895–1987), German World War II general
- Arthur P. Schmidt (1912–1965), American film editor
- Arthur P. Schmidt (music publisher) (1846–1921), American music publisher

== See also ==
- Arthur Schmitt (1910–1989), German gymnast
- Arthur J. Schmitt (1893–1971), American engineer, inventor, entrepreneur and philanthropist
