= Julius Schmidt =

Julius Schmidt or Schmid may refer to:

- Julius Schmidt (aviator) (died 1944), German World War I flying ace
- Julius Schmid (footballer) (born 2001), a Finnish-German football goalkeeper
- Julius Schmid (manufacturer) (1865–1939), creator of the Sheik and Ramses condoms
- Julius Schmid (painter) (1854–1935), Austrian painter
- Johann Friedrich Julius Schmidt (1825–1884), known as Julius Schmidt, German astronomer
