= Martin Schmidt =

Martin Schmidt may refer to:

- Martin Schmidt (football manager) (born 1967), Swiss football manager
- Martin Schmidt (footballer) (born 1983), German footballer
- Martin Schmidt (handballer) (born 1969), German handball player
- Martin Schmidt (judoka) (born 1969), German judoka
- Martin Schmidt (musician) (born 1964), member of the electronic music duo Matmos
- Martin Schmidt (politician) (born 1988), German politician
- Martin A. Schmidt (born 1960), American electrical engineer, president of Rensselaer Polytechnic Institute
- Martin Benno Schmidt (1863–1949), German pathologist
- Martin Johann Schmidt (1718–1801), Austrian painter
- Marty Schmidt (Martin Walter Schmidt, 1960–2013), New Zealand-American mountain climber, guide and adventurer
- DJ Dean (born 1978), German DJ and producer whose real name is Martin Schmidt

== See also ==
- Firmin Martin Schmidt (1918–2005), Roman Catholic bishop
- Martin Schmitt, German ski jumper
