= David Schmidt =

David Schmidt may refer to:

- Dave Schmidt (catcher) (1956–2026), American baseball catcher
- Dave Schmidt (pitcher) (born 1957), American baseball pitcher
- Dave Schmidt (politician), American politician in the state of Washington
- David Schmidt (handballer) (born 1993), German handball player

== See also ==
- David Smith (multiple people)
- David Schmidtz, philosopher
- David P. Schmitt, psychologist
