= Wolfgang Schmidt =

Wolfgang Schmidt may refer to:

- Wolfgang Schmidt (athlete) (born 1954), German track and field athlete
- Wolfgang Schmidt (politician), (born 1970) German politician
- Wolfgang M. Schmidt (born 1933), Austrian mathematician
- Wolfgang Schmidt, birth name of Beate Schmidt, German serial killer
- Wolfgang Schmidt (comics)
