= Rainer Schmidt (landscape architect) =

Rainer Schmidt (born 1954) is a German landscape architect, urban designer, and professor of landscape architecture at the Beuth University of Applied Sciences Berlin. Rainer operates three German offices located in Munich, Berlin, and Bernburg.

His work specializes in large scale projects in landscape architecture, environmental planning and urban design. His projects are found in places such as in Germany, Austria, China, Algeria and the Middle East countries.

== Life and career ==
Schmidt was born in Gelsenkirchen, Germany, and had practiced in gardening and landscaping from 1972 to 1975. Following this, he pursued an education in landscape architecture from 1975 to 1980 at the Hochschule Weihenstephan-Triesdorf in Freising, Germany.

After graduating in 1980, Schmidt began his career as a landscape architect in the office of Gottfried Hansjakob where he progressed towards Senior Landscape Architect and line manager. Since 1986, he has been registered as a Landscape Architect by the Bavarian Chamber of Architects. In 1991, Schmidt started his own office "Rainer Schmidt Landscape Architects and Urban Planners" and became a professor of "Landscape Architecture" at the Beuth University of Applied Sciences, Berlin, Germany. Schmidt has also taught as a guest professor at the University of California Berkeley, USA, in 2007 and the University of Beijing, China, in 2004. Since 2005, Schmidt has been a member of the advisory board of the German Society of Garden Architecture and Landscape Culture, Berlin, Germany (DGGL). Since 2008, Schmidt has been registered by the Bavarian Chamber of Architects as an urban planner.

== Awards ==
- 2002 Hans Bickel Prize for overall work
- 2006 Premio Internazionale Torsanlorenzo for the projects "Federal Garden Exhibition – BUGA, Munich, Germany" and "Bavarian National Museum, Munich, Germany"
- 2008 Premio Internazionale Torsanlorenzo for the projects "Villa Heldmann Garden, St. Gilgen, Austria" and "Paulinum Grammar School, Schwaz, Austria"
- 2009 BDLA Prize for the project "Villa Heldmann Garden, St. Gilgen, Austria"

== Projects ==
Rainer Schmidt's work has been showcased in a number of publications, displaying a wide variety of built projects of residential gardens, historic museum landscapes, temporary garden exhibitions, parks, and open public spaces. Rainer Schmidt has been in collaboration with Architect Helmut Jahn on many projects over the previous years, including the landscapes of Munich Airport, Weser Tower, and Highlight Towers.

=== Built ===
- Bavarian National Museum, Munich, Germany (2011)
- Campus University Applied Sciences in Derendorf, Düsseldorf, Germany (2015)
