= Georg Schmidt =

Georg Schmidt may refer to:

- Georg Friedrich Schmidt (1712–1775), German painter and engraver
- Georg Philipp Schmidt von Lübeck (1766–1849), German poet
- Georg Schmidt (football coach) (1927–1990), Austrian football coach
- Georg Schmidt (trade unionist) (1875–1946), German trade union leader and politician
