= Jeff Schmidt =

Jeff(rey) Schmidt may refer to:

- Jeff Schmidt (baseball) (born 1971), MLB pitcher
- Jeff Schmidt (musician), American bassist
- Jeff Schmidt (writer), American physicist and writer
- Jeffrey Schmidt (racing driver) (born 1994), Swiss racing driver
