= Brian Smith (American musician) =

American musician and poet (born 1990)

Brian Smith (American Musician)
- Born: February 20, 1990 (age 36); Carbondale, Illinois, U.S.
- Origin: Corvallis, Oregon
- Genres: Folk, freak folk, geofolk, new weird america, indie
- Occupations: Musician, singer-songwriter
- Instruments: Guitar, bass guitar, banjo, drum kit, percussion
- Years active: 2005–present
- Labels: Two Crows (US), PPZK (Germany), Fontee Fount (US), Purr Tapes (US), Blavatsky Records (Peru)
- Website: Brian Smith Official Website

Brian Eric Smith (born February 20, 1990) is an American musician and poet best known for his work as a solo performer.

== Life and career ==
Smith was born in Carbondale, Illinois and moved to Canby, Oregon when he was three. According to his website, "Brian was inspired by his older brother to begin playing guitar at the age of fourteen and start recording one year later. Since then, he has written and recorded over 450 songs, toured the US west coast five times, toured South America twice, performed in over thirty European countries, created an album containing more than forty personalized songs for each of his closest friends, served as president of the Oregon State University Musicians Guild for two years, and founded his own music festival as well as DIY music collective in Corvallis, Oregon, which he operated for four years."

Brian, a vegetarian, has been on an endless tour since August 1, 2012.

== Discography ==
Albums

- 2005 Early Home Recordings
- 2005–2012 Outtakes and Outdated Tracks
- 2006 Album 1
- 2006 Album 2
- 2007 Album 3
- 2007 Elephants Remember Bones of the Dead
- 2007 From The Thoughts In My Mind To The Computer In My Kitchen
- 2008 And We Packed Up Our Bags To Discover New Lands Under New Identities After Leaving Our Past Behind
- 2008 New Sounds From A New Home
- 2008 A Song For All My Friends
- 2009 A Venture Was Sought And Discoveries Were Made In Realms Of Love Among Other Good/Bad Things
- 2010 The Nights Grew Longer And The Rain Poured In
- 2011 Bloody Twins: Songs for the Separation of the Soul Longing for Life After Death
- 2012 WIZARD ISLAND (with Wizard Island)
- 2012 Serenity Infinity!
- 2012 Holding Hands (with Biological Lovers)
- 2013 Conscious Conscience Volume One: Voluntary Exile
- 2015 Searching For Sound (release date TBA)
- 2015 Magnum Opus I (release date TBA)

EPs

- 2008 Fully Fledged And Ready To Leave The Nest
- 2008 Songs From The Heart Of My Heart In The Heart Of Texas
- 2009 One Country At A Time: Tales Of Longing From The Adventurous Depths Of Peru
- 2012 Songs For Paul
- 2012 Miscellaneous Objects (with Collectanea)
- 2012 Farewell Home
- 2012 Old Flames Collected
- 2013 Sharing Secrets (with Biological Lovers)
- 2013 For Old Age
- 2013 "Feeling Freaky (with Biological Lovers)"

== Reviews ==
- Couchsurfing article on Brian Smith’s endless tour, 12 December, 2012
- Gazette Times review of Serenity Infinity!, 28 December, 2012
- Gazette Times Review of The Nights Grew Longer And The Rain Poured In, 25 November, 2010
- Le Blog des critiques de concerts, 9 August 2012
- Odio La Musica, 22 March, 2012
