= Brian K. Smith =

American academic

Brian K. Smith is The Honorable David S. Nelson Professorial Chair and Associate Dean for Research at Boston College's School of Education and Human Development. Previously, he was senior associate dean of academic affairs at Drexel University's College of Computing and Informatics and dean of continuing education at Rhode Island School of Design. He also had appointments at MIT and Penn State, and has held rotation appointments at the National Science Foundation.

== Academic career ==
Smith was an assistant & associate professor of Media Arts and Sciences in the MIT Media Laboratory from 1997-2002, where he conducted research on software for use in education, particularly software incorporating multimedia with an emphasis on visual features and design. His research during this time covered different aspects of education, including music, biology, and history. His research during this time also included the potential benefits of a multimedia approach to patient counseling and education.

Smith was an associate professor of Information Sciences and Technology and Education at Pennsylvania State University., where he was the principal investigator for its Medical Informatics Research Initiative and Director of its Solutions Institute.

At Penn State, he continued educational multimedia software research, branching out into studies of physically active computer gaming and Fantasy basketball. He was also a member of the panel that produced the National Research Council report, Learning Science in Informal Environments: People, Places, and Pursuits.

== Selected publications ==
- Kantharaju, P., Alderfer, K., Zhu, J., Char, B., Smith, B., Ontañón, S. (2022). Modeling player knowledge in a parallel programming educational game. IEEE Transactions on Games, 14(1): 64-75.
- Smith, B.K. (2016). Living in the fourth quadrant: Valuing the process of design. In V. Svihla and R. Reeve (eds.), Design as scholarship: Case studies from the learning sciences (pp. 55-70). New York, NY: Routledge.
- Smith, B. K., Frost, J., Albayrak, M., and Sudhakar, R. (2007). "Integrating glucometers and digital photography as experience capture tools to enhance patient understanding and communication of diabetes self-management practices." Personal and Ubiquitous Computing, 11(4): 273-286.
- Smith, B.K., Frost, J., Albayrak, M., & Sudhakar, R. (2006). "Facilitating narrative medical discussions of type 1 diabetes with computer visualizations and photography." Patient Education and Counseling, 64: 313-321.
- Smith, B.K., Sharma, P., & Hooper, P. (2006). "Decision making in online fantasy sports communities." Interactive Technology & Smart Education, 4: 347-360.
- Smith, B.K. (2006). "Design and computational flexibility." Digital Creativity, 17(2): 65-72.
- Smith, B.K. (2005). "Physical fitness in virtual worlds." IEEE Computer, 38(10): 101-103.
- Smith, B.K. & Reiser, B.J. (2005). "Explaining behavior using video for observational inquiry and theory articulation." The Journal of the Learning Sciences, 14(3): 315-360.
- Smith, B.K. & Blankinship, E.. (2000). "Justifying imagery: Multimedia support for learning through explanation." IBM Systems Journal, 39(3&4): 749-767.
- Reiser, B.J., Tabak, I., Sandoval, W.A., Smith, B.K., Steinmuller, F., & Leone, A.J. (2001). "BGuILE: Strategic and conceptual scaffolds for scientific inquiry in biology classrooms." In S.M. Carver & D. Klahr (eds.), Cognition and Instruction: Twenty Five Years of Progress (pp. 263–305). Mahwah, NJ: Lawrence Erlbaum Associates.
