= Herbert B. Schmidt =

German economist and public policy advisor

Herbert B. Schmidt (23 April 1931 - 7 March 2024) was a German economist and public policy advisor, best known for his work in privatization in the former East Germany and Eastern Europe.

Schmidt is considered the author of the "German Method" of privatization, in which shares of a state-owned company are tendered to the private sector buyer offering the best bid considering a number of factors including price, numbers of jobs guaranteed, environmental remediation, and other concerns. Schmidt was the chief privatization advisor to Estonian Prime Minister Mart Laar, and is a former economics minister of the German Lander of Saxony. From 1998 to 2001, he was Commissioner of the Securities Commission of Bosnia and Herzegovina.

In 1998, he was awarded the Order of the White Star of Estonia for his work with the German Treuhandanstalt in Estonia. Schmidt's efforts in privatization were particularly detailed in a festschrift published for his 90th birthday.
