= Klaus Schmidt =

Klaus Schmidt may refer to:

- Klaus Schmidt (mathematician) (born 1943), Austrian mathematician
- Klaus Schmidt (archaeologist) (1953–2014), German archaeologist
- Klaus Schmidt (footballer) (born 1967), Austrian footballer
- Klaus M. Schmidt (born 1961), German economist
