= Oscar Schmidt (disambiguation) =

Oscar Schmidt (1958–2026) was a Brazilian basketball player.

Oscar Schmidt may also refer to:

- Oscar Schmidt Inc., musical instrument manufacturer based in New Jersey
- Oscar Schmidt Jr. (1896–1973), United States Navy sailor and Medal of Honor recipient
- Eduard Oscar Schmidt (1823–1886), German zoologist
- Oskar Schmidt (ice hockey) (1908–1974), Swiss ice hockey player
