= Thomas S. Schmidt =

Thomas S. Schmidt is professor of Ancient Greek at the Institut des Études Anciennes of the Université Laval (Quebec city). His contributions to his field of study include the following:

== Book ==
- Plutarque et les Barbares: La Rhetorique d'Une Image, Peeters (1999) ISBN 90-4290-778-9

== Papers/Articles ==
- Trois rescapés de la Grande Guerre : les papyrus grecs de la Collection Fernand Mayence. ZPE 1999, 127, p. 149-156 pl. 3-5.
- The Toronto Ostracon with a hypothesis of « Iliad » 20 (2725 Pack2) : reedition enlarged with a new fragment. APF 2002 48 (2) : 213-221 pl. 28
- A Toronto ostracon with a list of monosyllables (2718 Pack2) : re-edition with commentary. ZPE 2005 N° 152 : 209-217
