= Harry Schmidt =

Harry Schmidt may refer to:

- Harry Schmidt (USMC) (1886–1968), commanded the Fourth Marine Division in the Pacific during World War II
- Harry Schmidt (mathematician) (1894–1951), German applied mathematician
- Harry Schmidt (pentathlete) (1916–1977), South African Olympic modern pentathlete
- Harry Schmidt (Air National Guard), American fighter pilot instructor
