= Heinrich Schmidt =

Heinrich Schmidt may refer to:

== People ==
- Heinrich Schmidt (composer) (1904-1988), Austrian composer
- Heinrich Schmidt (philosopher) (1874–1935), German archivist, naturalist and philosopher professor
- Heinrich Schmidt (politician) (1902–1960), NSDAP politician
- SS-Hauptsturmführer Heinrich Schmidt (physician) (1912–2000), medic at Majdanek extermination camp
- Heinrich Julian Schmidt (1818–1886), German journalist
- Carl Ernst Heinrich Schmidt (1822–1894), Russian chemist
- Heinrich Schmidt (footballer) (1912–1988), German footballer

== Ships ==
- SS Heinrich Schmidt, a German cargo ship in service 1936–45.
