= Pascal Schmidt =

German footballer

Personal information
- Date of birth: 17 January 1992 (age 34)
- Place of birth: Unna, Germany
- Height: 1.74 m (5 ft 9 in)
- Position: Midfielder

Team information
- Current team: TuS Bersenbrück
- Number: 31

Youth career
- 1995–2003: Königsborner SV
- 2004–2004: Hammer SpVg
- 2004–2011: Rot Weiss Ahlen

Senior career*
Years	Team	Apps	(Gls)
2011	Rot Weiss Ahlen	4	(0)
2011–2013	Schalke 04 II	59	(9)
2013–2014	Arminia Bielefeld	0	(0)
2013–2014	Arminia Bielefeld II		
2014–2016	Sportfreunde Lotte	32	(4)
2016–2017	KFC Uerdingen 05	32	(8)
2017–2019	Hammer SpVg	56	(21)
2019–2021	Rot Weiss Ahlen	23	(4)
2021–2024	Türkspor Dortmund		
2024–	TuS Bersenbrück	0	(0)
- * Club domestic league appearances and goals as of 23 January 2021

Pascal Schmidt (born 17 January 1992) is a German footballer who plays as a midfielder for TuS Bersenbrück.
