= Charles Schmidt (theologian) =

French historian and theologian (1812–1895)

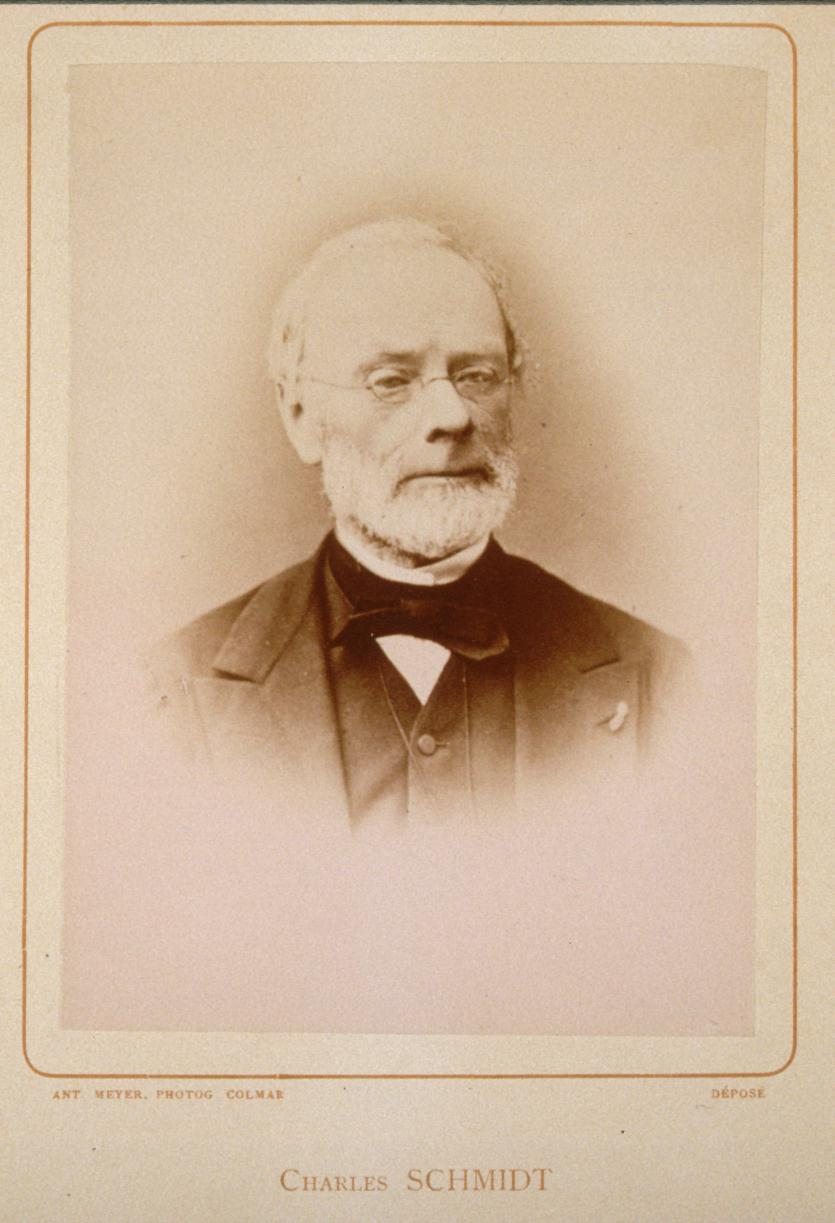
- Born: Charles-Guillaume-Adolphe Schmidt; 20 June 1812; Strasbourg, France
- Died: March 11, 1895 (aged 82); Strasbourg, German Empire

Academic background
- Education: Protestant Faculty of Theology

Academic work
- Discipline: history theology
- Institutions: University of Strasbourg
- Main interests: Church history
- Notable works: Histoire et doctrine de la secte des Cathares ou Albigeois

Signature
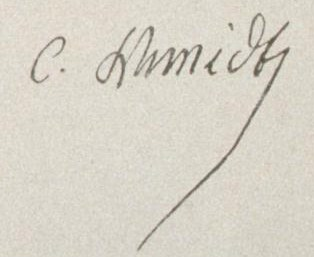

Guillaume Adolphe Charles Schmidt, born 20 June 1812 in Strasbourg, France and died March 11, 1895 in the same city, was a French Protestant historian and theologian. He taught Church history at the Protestant Faculty of Theology in Strasbourg from 1864 until his death. He directed the Protestant Gymnasium from 1849 to 1859, and again from 1865 to 1868.

== Biography ==
Charles Schmidt was the son of Charles Frédéric Schmidt, managing partner of the Arcades bookstore, and of Marguerite Salomée Pfaehler, who was the daughter of the founder of the same bookstore. He completed his secondary studies at the Protestant Gymnasium, followed by preparatory studies at the Protestant seminary in Strasbourg. In 1830, he entered the Protestant Faculty of Theology in Strasbourg, where he obtained the degrees of Bachelor (1833), Licentiate (1835) and Doctor of Theology (1836). He completed his studies with study trips to Geneva, Paris, and Göttingen. He married Julie Pauline Strohl in Strasbourg in 1840.

Charles Schmidt was a lecturer in history at the Protestant Seminary in 1837. He obtained his first chair, a chair of homiletics, in 1839 at the University of Strasbourg and at the Seminary. Between 1849 and 1859 he was also director of the Protestant Gymnasium. Then again between 1865 and 1868. With a rather liberal tendency, he set up classes for the newly instituted baccalaureate in science and transformed the industrial classes so that they could benefit from a more comprehensive education. However, his successor, Édouard Reuss, criticized him for his poor management of the school's funds.

In 1864, Charles Schmidt changed his chair to that of Ecclesiastical History, left vacant after the death of André Jung. His teaching is notably summarized in his Précis de l'histoire de l'Église d'Occident pendant le Moyen Âge, published in 1885.

When Alsace was annexed by Germany in 1871, Schmidt initially considered joining the Faculty of Protestant Theology in Paris, but finally decided to stay in Strasbourg. He retired in 1877.

Perfectly bilingual, Charles Schmidt wrote equally well in French and German. His study of the Cathars, whom he nevertheless considered pagans, was decisive in the beginnings of methodical criticism in history. He was also passionate about bibliography and libraries. When he left his teaching career, he retired to his house on Rue Saltzmann, which had formerly been the home of Johannes Sturm.

Schmidt devoted himself to the history of Alsace until his death in 1895.

Charles Schmidt (1872-1956), historian and archivist, is his grandson.

== Select bibliography ==
Charles Schmidt was particularly interested in medieval history, including topics such as sects and mystics. He also researched the Protestant Reformation and its theologians. His work on the history of Alsace is well-known.

Schmidt also worked as a translator and printer. He published ancient poems and documents he discovered in libraries. He wrote numerous biographical and topographical notices and several articles for journals, including the Revue d'Alsace and the Bulletin des monuments historiques. He also made important copies of documents, some of which were destroyed in the fire at the Temple Neuf in 1870. He was renowned during his lifetime for his great erudition.

- Études sur Farel, Strasbourg, G. Silbermann, 1834 - (bachelor's thesis in theology).
- Vie de Pierre Martyr Vermigli, Strasbourg, G. Silbermann, 1835 - (bachelor's thesis).
- Essai sur les mystiques du quatorzième siècle, Strasbourg, G. Silbermann, 1836 - (doctoral thesis).
- De la mission du théologien aujourd'hui, Strasbourg, F. G. Levrault, 1838.
- Essai sur Jean Gerson, chancelier de l'Université et de l'Église de Paris, Strasbourg, Chez Schmidt et Grucker, 1839.
- (de) Meister Eckart, ein Beitrag zur Geschichte der Theologie und Philosophie des Mittelalters, [s. l.], [s. n.], 1839.
- Notice sur la ville de Strasbourg, Strasbourg, Chez Schmidt et Grucker, 1842.
- De l'Objet de la théologie pratique, Strasbourg, G. Silbermann, 1844.
- Gérard Roussel, prédicateur de la reine Marguerite de Navarre. Mémoire servant à l'histoire des premières tentatives faites pour introduire la Réformation en France, Strasbourg, Chez Schmidt et Grucker, 1845.
- Histoire et doctrine de la secte des Cathares ou Albigeois, Paris, J. Cherbuliez, 1848-1849, 2 vol. - (vol. 1).
- Essai historique sur la société civile dans le monde romain et sur sa transformation par le christianisme, Strasbourg, C. F. Schmidt, 1853.
- La vie et les travaux de Jean Sturm, premier recteur du Gymnase et de l'Académie de Strasbourg, 1855.
- Histoire du chapitre de Saint-Thomas de Strasbourg pendant le Moyen Âge, Strasbourg, C. F. Schmidt, 1860.
- (de) Philipp Melanchthon, Leben und ausgewählte Schriften, Elberfeld, R. L. Friderichs, 1861.
- (de) Nicolaus von Basel, Leben und ausgewählte Schriften, Wien, W. Braumüller, 1866.
- Histoire littéraire de l'Alsace à la fin du quinzième et au commencement du seizième siècle, 1879, Paris, Fischbacher, 2 vol. - (vol. 2).- Prix Bordin de l’Académie française
- Précis de l'histoire de l'Église d'Occident pendant le Moyen Âge, Paris, Fischbacher, 1885.
- Herrade de Landsberg, Strasbourg, Heitz et Mündel, 1893.
- Répertoire bibliographique des imprimeurs strasbourgeois de 1480 à 1530, Strasbourg, Heitz et Mündel, 1893-1896, 8 vol.
- "Notes sur les seigneurs, les paysans, et la propriété rurale en Alsace au Moyen Âge". Annales de l'Est: 357, 389, 501–537. 1895., Annales de l'Est, 1896, 10e année (lire en ligne), p. 161-202, 337-380, 497-528
- (de) Wörterbuch der Strassburger Mundart, 1896 - (posthumous).
- Les seigneurs, les paysans et la propriété rurale en Alsace au Moyen Âge, Paris - Nancy, Berger-Levrault et Cie, 1897 - (posthumous).
- (de) Historisches Wörterbuch der elsässischen Mundart, Strassburg, Heitz, 1901 - (posthumous).
