= Albert Schmidt (politician) =

German politician (1951–2024)

Member of the Bundestag
- In office 10 November 1994 – 18 October 2005

Personal details
- Born: 13 February 1951 Uffenheim, Bavaria, West Germany
- Died: 4 November 2024 (aged 73) Berlin, Germany
- Party: Alliance 90/The Greens
- Education: Catholic University of Eichstätt-Ingolstadt
- Occupation: Schoolteacher

Albert Schmidt (13 February 1951 – 4 November 2024) was a German politician. A member of Alliance 90/The Greens, he served in the Bundestag, from 1994 to 2005.

Schmidt died in Berlin on 4 November 2024, at the age of 73.
