= Franz Schmidt (footballer) =

Peruvian footballer (born 2000)

Personal information
- Full name: Franz Wendelin Schmidt Silva
- Date of birth: 3 May 2000 (age 26)
- Place of birth: Lima, Peru
- Height: 1.85 m (6 ft 1 in)
- Position: Centre-back

Team information
- Current team: Los Chankas
- Number: 3

Youth career
- Universidad San Martín
- Alianza Lima

Senior career*
Years	Team	Apps	(Gls)
2019–2021	Alianza Lima	0	(0)
2019	→ Unión Huaral (loan)	1	(0)
2020	→ Carlos A. Mannucci (loan)	2	(0)
2021	→ Unión Huaral (loan)	4	(0)
2022–2023	Alianza Universidad	46	(4)
2024	Cusco	11	(0)
2025–	Los Chankas	1	(0)

International career
2015 2017	Peru U15 / Peru U17		
- * Club domestic league appearances and goals as of 12:54, 30 March 2025 (UTC)

Franz Wendelin Schmidt Silva (born 3 May 2000) is a Peruvian footballer who plays as a centre-back for Peruvian Primera División side Los Chankas

== Career ==
Schmidt was promoted to Alianza Lima's reserve squad in February 2018. On 5 September 2019, Schmidt was loaned out to Peruvian Segunda División club Unión Huaral. He made his debut for the club on 12 October 2019 against Sport Loreto.

In January 2020, Schmidt was loaned out once again, this time alongside his teammate José Gallardo to Peruvian Primera División side Carlos A. Mannucci for the rest of the year.

In April 2021, Schmidt returned to Unión Huaral once again on a loan deal for the rest of the year. On 20 January 2022, Schmidt left Alianza Lima permanently, to join Peruvian Segunda División side Alianza Universidad.

Ahead of the 2024 season, Schmidt signed a one-year deal with Peruvian Primera División side Cusco FC. In December 2024, Schmidt moved to Los Chankas.
