= Patrick Schmidt =

Patrick Schmidt may refer to:

- Patrick Schmidt (footballer, born 1988), German footballer
- Patrick Schmidt (footballer, born 1993), German footballer
- Patrick Schmidt (footballer, born 1998), Austrian footballer
- Patrick Schmidt (field hockey), Austrian field hockey player
- Patrick Schmidt (politician), American politician

== See also ==
- Patrick Schmit (born 1974), Luxembourgish figure skater
