= Weißenkirchen im Attergau =

- Municipality
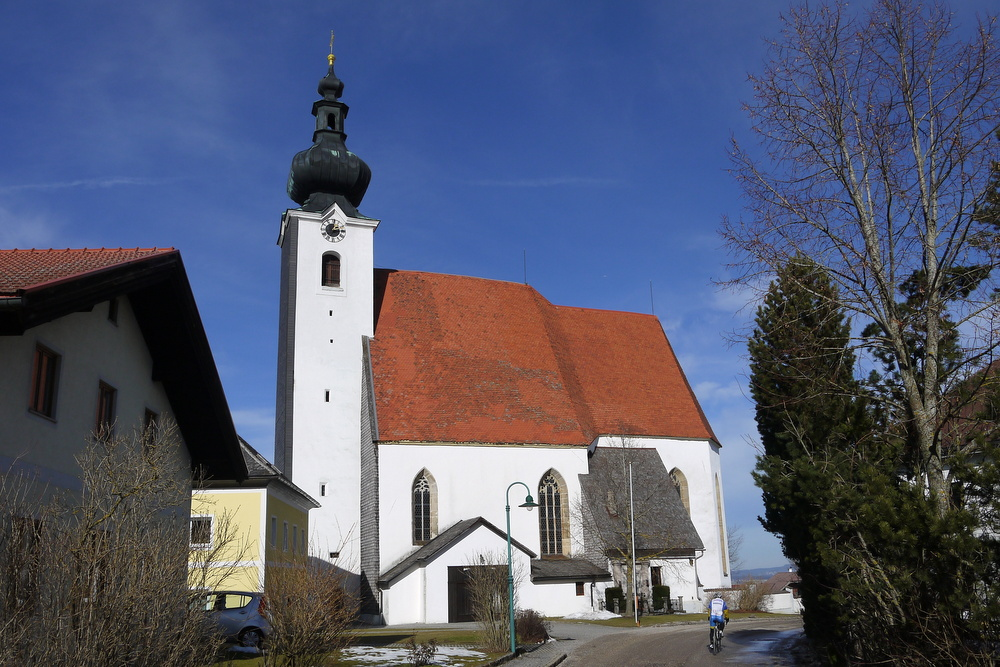

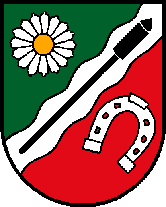
- Coat of arms

- Location within Austria
- Coordinates: 47°56′52″N 13°25′00″E
- Country: Austria
- State: Upper Austria
- District: Vöcklabruck

Government
  - Mayor: Josef Meinhart (ÖVP)

Area
  - Total: 26.69 km^{2} (10.31 sq mi)
- Elevation: 650 m (2,130 ft)

Population (2018-01-01)
  - Total: 964
  - Density: 36.1/km^{2} (93.5/sq mi)
- Time zone: UTC+1 (CET)
  - Summer (DST): UTC+2 (CEST)
- Postal code: 4890
- Area code: 07684
- Vehicle registration: VB
- Website: www.oberoesterreich.at/ weissenkirchen.attergau

Weißenkirchen im Attergau is a municipality in the district of Vöcklabruck in the Austrian state of Upper Austria.

== Population ==
Historical population
Year	Pop.	±%
1991	921	—
2001	964	+4.7%
2016	949	−1.6%
