= Bryan Smyth =

Irish actor and singer

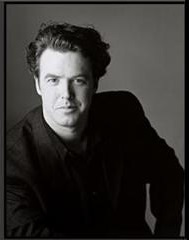
Bryan Smyth

Bryan Smyth is an Irish singer, television presenter, actor, and artist. He was born in Dublin, Ireland.

== Biography ==
Smyth came to light as a singer at a young age; as a boy soprano he found himself in demand in many churches in Dublin. He studied singing at the Leinster School of Music & Drama. He joined his local drama society in his late teens. By his early twenties he was playing many amateur leading parts, and he quickly turned professional.

As an actor and singer he appeared in productions ranging from Oklahoma!, Hello, Dolly!, Follies, Sweeney Todd to The Rocky Horror Show. Drama work includes Glengarry Glen Ross at the Andrews Lane Theatre, Dublin, Sive and The Cuchulain Cycle. Smyth's first musical West End performance was in 1999 when he was asked to play the role of Matthew Mugg alongside Phillip Schofield in Leslie Bricusse's stage adaptation of the film musical Doctor Dolittle directed by Steven Pimlott. He trained in London with top voice coach Mary Hammond and Smyth's performance in the show brought much critical acclaim. The show ran for over 500 performances in London's largest theatre. After many offers from various musicals he decided to take up an offer to work on television and return to Ireland.

Bryan hosted the TV quiz show, It's Not the Answer, which ran for four years on RTÉ. The show was then cancelled. While working on the show he was asked to open and close the 2000 New Year's Eve show on RTÉ. He has also appeared in the Variety Club with Tony Bennett and Julie Andrews. He has also appeared with Andy Williams and is also a frequent guest on The Lyrics Board game show also on RTÉ with Eurovision Song Contest winner Paul Harrington and Kyron Bourke. He has also worked and performed with Hazel O'Connor, Millicent Martin, and Lorna Luft. He has also performed for Prince Charles at the London Palladium .He has also performed at the Burj Al Arab in Dubai. 2008 saw Smyth return to performing. Smyth is well known for his charity work in particular with Variety, the Children's Charity. In 2012 Smyth toured the US as leading male vocalist in an Irish-themed show.
