= Sebastian Schmidt (politician) =

German politician (born 1993)

Member of the Bundestag
- Incumbent
- Assumed office 2025

Personal details
- Born: 8 August 1993 Oldenburg in Holstein
- Party: CDU

Sebastian Schmidt (born August 8, 1993 in Oldenburg in Holstein) is a German politician for the CDU and since 2025 a member of the Bundestag, the federal diet.
