= Ingo Gädechens =

German politician (born 1960)

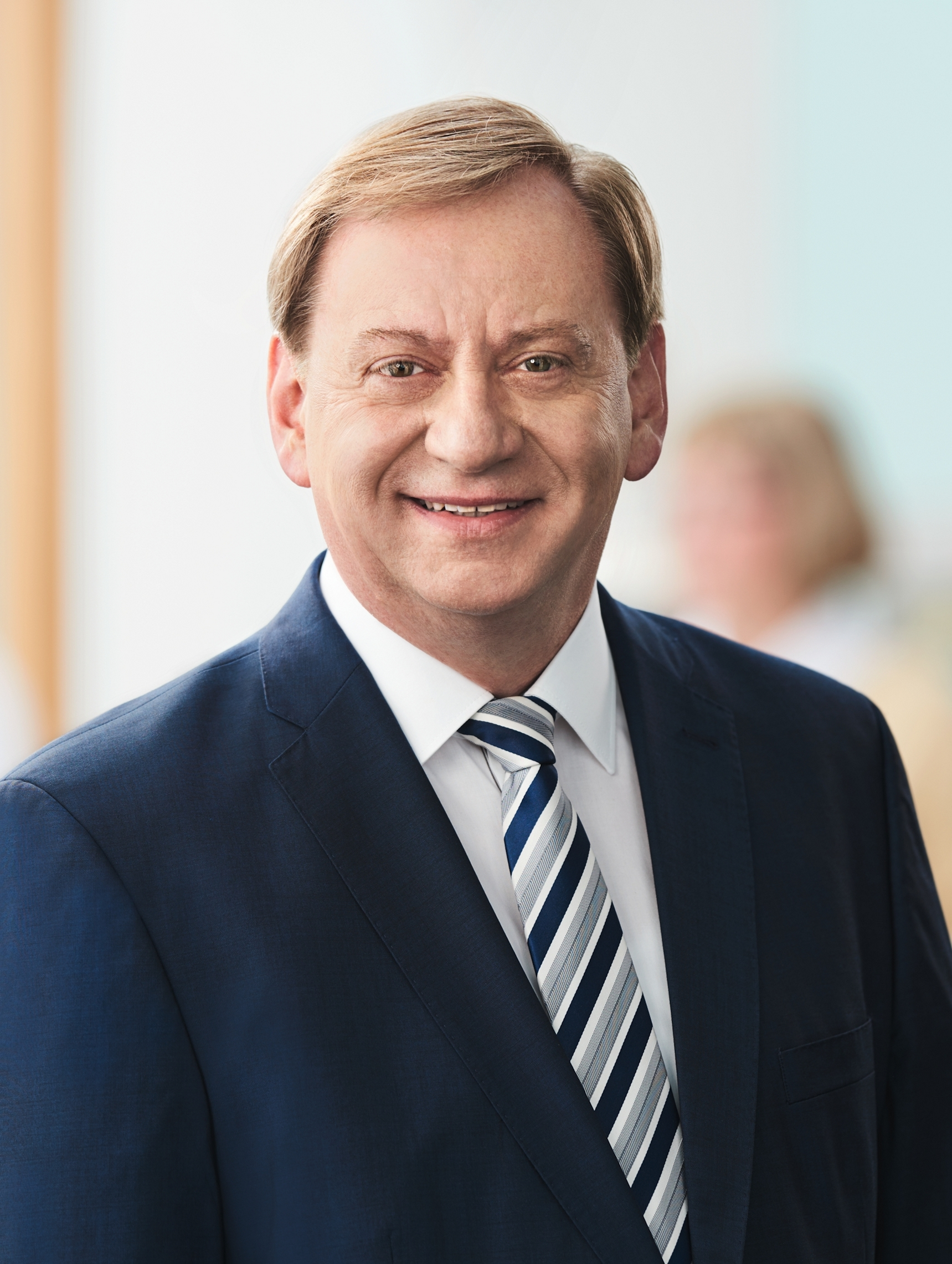
- Ingo Gädechens in 2017

Member of the Bundestag
- Incumbent
- Assumed office 2009

Personal details
- Born: 30 July 1960 (age 65) Lübeck, West Germany (now Germany)
- Party: CDU

Ingo Gädechens (born 30 July 1960) is a German soldier and politician of the Christian Democratic Union who has been serving as a member of the Bundestag from the state of Schleswig-Holstein since 2009.

== Political career ==
Gädechens first became a member of the Bundestag after the 2009 German federal election. He is a member of the Budget Committee and the Defence Committee. Since 2022, he has also been a member of the so-called Confidential Committee (Vertrauensgremium) of the Budget Committee, which provides budgetary supervision for Germany's three intelligence services, BND, BfV and MAD.

In 2024, Gädechens announced, that he isn't seeking re-election for Bundestag in 2025.
