= Peto =

Peto may refer to:

== People ==
- Peto (surname), includes a list of people with the surname Peto
- Kawu Peto Dukku (1958–2010), Nigerian politician, Senator for the Gombe North constituency of Gombe State, Nigeria

== Other uses ==
- PETO, a German party
- Peto (food), a Colombian dessert
- USS Peto (SS-265), a US submarine
- Parnall Peto, a British seaplane
- Peto baronets, two baronetcies created for members of the Peto family, both in the Baronetage of the United Kingdom
- Peto, Yucatán, a town
- Peto Municipality in Yucatán state, Mexico
- A minor character who appears in the Henriad plays by Shakespeare as a criminal associate of Falstaff
- Grissell and Peto, a civil engineering partnership between Thomas Grissell and his cousin Morton Peto
- Peto, Brassey and Betts, a civil engineering partnership between Samuel Morton Peto, Thomas Brassey and Edward Betts
- Peto and Betts, a civil engineering partnership formed in 1848 between Morton Peto and Edward Ladd Betts

== See also ==
- Peeto, genus of spiders
