= Peto (surname) =

Peto is a surname. Notable people with the name include:

- András Pető (1893–1967), Hungarian practitioner of physical rehabilitation, inspired conductive education
- Basil Peto (1862–1945), English politician
- Christopher Peto (1897–1980), English politician
- Dorothy Peto (1886–1974) British women's police pioneer
- Geoffrey Peto (1878–1956), English politician
- Gladys Emma Peto (1890–1977), English artist, fashion designer, illustrator and writer of children's books
- Harold Peto (1854–1933), English architect and garden designer
- Henry Peto (1780–1830), English building contractor
- John F. Peto (1854–1907), American painter
- John Peto (cricketer) (died 1874), English cricketer
- John Peto (politician) (1900–1954), British Conservative Party politician
- Judit Pető (born 1921), birth name of Hungarian designer Judith Leiber
- Julian Peto, English statistician and cancer epidemiologist
- László Pető (fencer) (born 1948), Hungarian fencer
- László Pető (sport shooter) (born 1969), Hungarian sports shooter
- Len Peto (1892–1985), ice hockey executive
- Michael Peto, also known as Mihály Petö (1908–1970), Hungarian-British photojournalist
- Morton Peto (1809–1889), English entrepreneur, civil engineer and railway developer
- Richard Peto (born 1943), English professor of medical statistics and Epidemiology in the University of Oxford
- Rosemary Peto (1916–1998), English artist
- Samuel Petto (c.1624-1711), English Puritan clergyman
- Samuel Morton Peto (1809–1889), English construction entrepreneur
- Silvia Petöová (1968–2019), Slovak actress
- Tibor Peto (born 1980), Hungarian rower
- Tim Peto (born 1950), English professor of medicine of the University of Oxford
- William Peto, English cricketer
- Zoltán Pető (born 1974), Hungarian footballer
