= Grissell and Peto =

British civil engineering partnership

Grissell and Peto was a civil engineering partnership between Thomas Grissell and his cousin Morton Peto that built many major buildings and monuments in London and became one of the major contractors in the building of the rapidly expanding railways of the time.

== Background ==
Thomas Grissell (1801–1874) had originally been apprenticed to his uncle, Henry Peto. Once his apprenticeship was finished Grissell was invited to join his uncle in a partnership.

Samuel Morton Peto (1809–1889), normally known as Morton Peto, had also been apprenticed to his uncle, Henry Peto. His apprenticeship finished a short time before Henry Peto died in 1830.

On the death of Henry Peto, Thomas Grissell and Morton Peto formed a partnership, Grissell and Peto, that operated between 1830 and 1847.

== Contracts undertaken ==
The first contract that Grissell and Peto won was for the rebuilding of Hungerford Market at Charing Cross in the Strand, London. At the time Peto was only 21 years old and his youthful appearance seems to have caused some concern amongst the committee considering the tenders. Peto met with the committee when the tenders were opened and Grissell and Peto found to be the lowest by £400. The Earl of Devon, the chairman of the committee, asked Peto to leave the room, and on being recalled the Earl informed him that the committee were greatly concerned about giving such an important contract to so young a man. Peto replied that if they wished he would fetch his partner, who looked old enough for anything; adding that is his youthful looks were a problem, he would, “take to wearing spectacles, or adopt some other mode of giving myself an appearance of increased age.”

Peto wrote:

“We have very much to contend with — a large business and circumscribed capital present many discouraging circumstances; but you know we must ‘Press Forward’ (the motto of the Grissell family). We have made a tender for the Hungerford Market — our amount was £42,400; it was accepted; but we do not feel dismayed, the payments are very good — three-fourths every three months, and two years to complete it in.”

The early difficulties of the firm were overcome. Their first contract proved a very remunerative one, and they became one of the most important building firms in the kingdom. Writing nearly 40 years later, Peto recalled, “A building business is a very good one if a man thoroughly knows it. When I was with Mr. Grissell, our ordinary business coming regularly from the large breweries and fire offices, and the work of our own connection with the architects, netted on the average £11,000 to £12,000 a year, and with only £50,000 capital engaged in that department.”

Grissell and Peto went on to build many other well-known buildings in London, including the Reform Club, the Oxford & Cambridge Club, the Lyceum, St James's Theatre and Hungerford Market. In addition, they built Nelson's Column (1843) and the vast infrastructure project of the London Brick Sewer.

As the demand for railways grew, Grissell and Peto undertook a great deal of railway construction, including:

- the section of the Great Western Railway between Hanwell to Langley, apart from the embankment,
- the section of the Great Western Railway between Reading and Goring,
- Paddington Station and Reading Station,
- a large portion of the South-Eastern Railway;
- the Eastern Counties Railway'

The last contracts that Grissell and Peto took on were for the new Houses of Parliament.

Starting in 1840, the first contract was for the range of buildings fronting the River Thames, along with the Speaker's residence and the libraries. The second contract was for the Houses of Lords and Commons, the Great Central Hall, the Victoria Hall, the Royal Gallery, and House of Commons offices. The third contract was for St. Stephen's Hall and Porch.

== Termination of the partnership ==
The partnership was very successful but Grissell did not like the risks and the heavy financial commitment involved in the large railway contracts although they had mostly been very profitable, while Peto felt that the profitability of the railway contracts out-weighed the risks. During the work on the Houses of Parliament, Grissell and Peto agreed to dissolved their partnership, with the formal break taking place on 2 March 1846.

Grissell took over the building business, saw-mills, and premises, and also the River Severn Improvement contract.

Peto took over the railway works:

- a contract on the South Eastern Railway, including the Folkestone Viaduct and about 12 miles of bridges and earthworks,
- the Ely and Peterborough and Norfolk Railway contracts,
- the Southampton to Dorchester section of the London and South-Western Railway.

Peto wrote:

"These three contracts will just occupy me enough to thoroughly interest me. All my stock-in-trade will be £25,000 of plant, and all the rest clear capital ... Mr. Grissell would stand with our stock-in-trade and plant of £150,000, including houses built and building for the firm, and, besides, he will have a large and abundant capital in money; but, then, mine being all in money but the £25,000, I shall have it clear and ready for using, or taking on some one or two large railway works, and nothing else, which will only half occupy my time, and then the power of capital will always, with my previous experience, give me a preference without my being known as a competitor to anyone."

That year, Peto formed a partnership with Edward Betts, known as Peto and Betts who, among other railway construction contracts, built the Birmingham & Oxford Junction Railway between the northern end of the Oxford & Rugby Railway at Knightcote and Birmingham Snow Hill. Previously, Grissell and Peto had been working on the Hythe to Folkestone section of the South Eastern Railway and the contract for the ballasting and permanent way between Reigate and Folkestone had been undertaken by Betts. In 1842 Grissell and Peto had difficulties with the Saltwood Tunnel and both companies agreed to finish the tunnel together. Later Betts married Peto's sister, Ann.

== Aftermath ==
It was later found that once the final accounts of Grissell and Peto were completed, Peto should have received an additional £5,000. Grissell wished to make the payment but Peto refused. Years later, Peto died while in dire financial difficulties. Grissell, by a codicil to his will, left the £5,000 to Peto's eldest son.
