= Harvington School =

Prep school for girls in London, England

Harvington Preparatory School
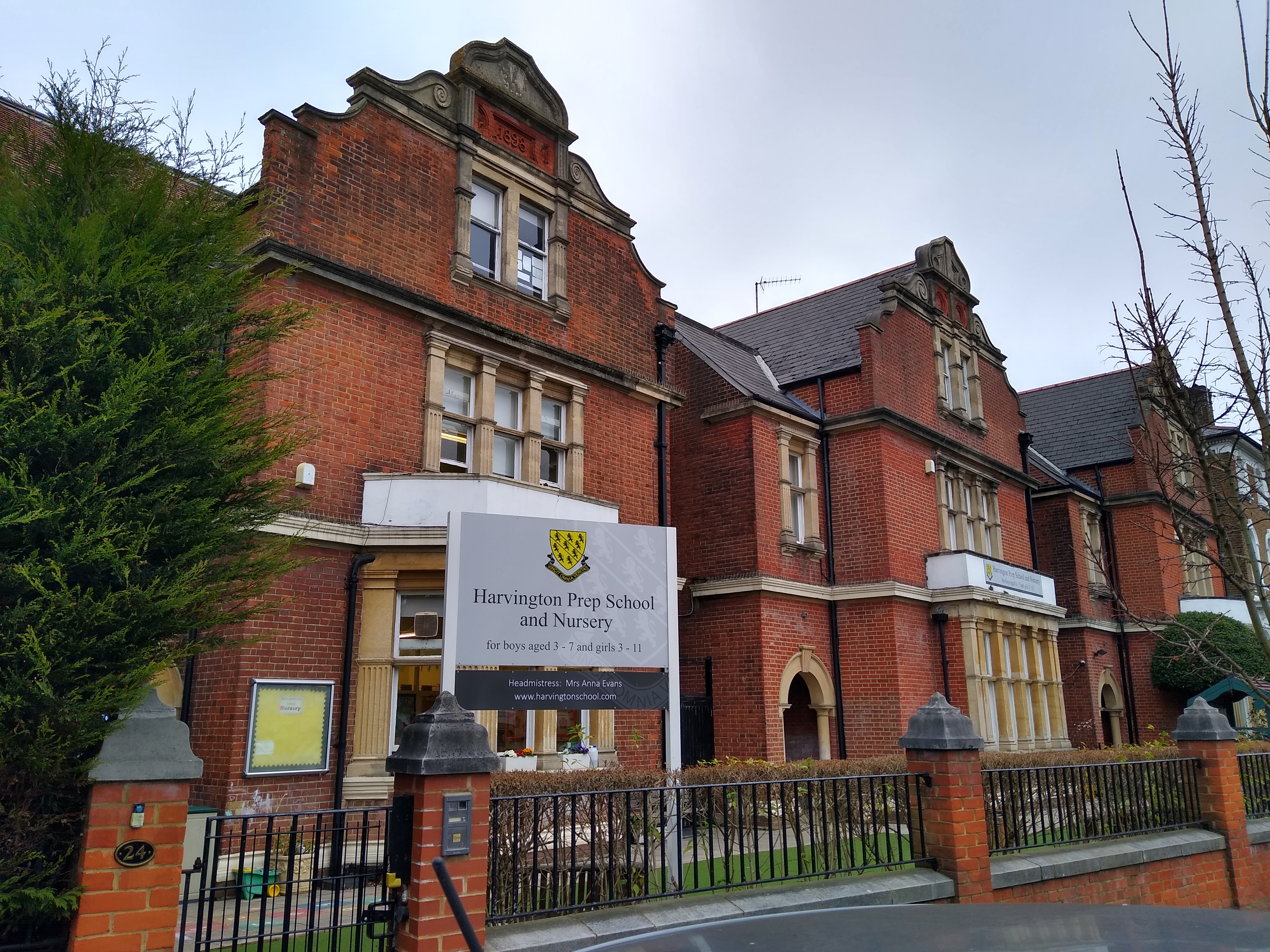

Location
- 20 Castlebar Road; London, W5 2DS; England
- Coordinates: 51.5167°N 0.307245°W

Information
- Type: Preparatory day school
- Motto: Latin: Vincit Omnia Veritas (Truth Conquers All)
- Established: 1890
- Closed: 31 August 2023.
- Local authority: Ealing
- Department for Education URN: 101945 Tables
- Head: Mr G Entwisle
- Gender: Girls (with a co-educational nursery)
- Age: 3 to 11
- Enrolment: 140
- Houses: Gordon, Duncan, Kennedy, Norris
- Colours: Yellow, Grey and Black
- Former pupils: Old Harvingtonians
- Website: www.harvingtonschool.com

Harvington Prep School and Nursery was an independent school in Ealing, West London. Founded in 1890 as a kindergarten called Heidelberg College, the school was renamed Harvington College during World War I. For much of its history, it operated as a private girls' school for ages three to eighteen, with boys included at nursery, and occupied three modernised Victorian houses on Castlebar Road. In 2010, Harvington School closed its senior school, focusing instead on its preparatory school. Most recently, it has been co-educational up to Year 2, with girls continuing through Year 6. In April 2022, Harvington Prep announced that it would merge with Durston House, a neighbouring boys' school, to form a single co-educational school in September 2023.

== History ==
The school opened in 1890 as Heidelberg College, a kindergarten school run by two sisters, Misses Watson. It was named after Heidelberg, Germany, the birthplace of Chrystabel Watson’s mentor, and was originally located at 67 Gordon Road in Ealing.

In 1892, a third Watson sister, Florence Watson, took over Heidelberg College, with Chrystabel her deputy. They opened a private girls' boarding and day school, and in 1898, they moved into a larger house on Castlebar Road. By 1908, the school occupied both 24 and 26 Castlebar Road. As of 1912, fees started at 60 guineas per annum. Heidelberg College was said to rival Princess Helena College in popularity. Boarders came from overseas, as well as other parts of Britain. The school also catered to the local community, which included families of veterans of the India Office and military services, as well as the Civil Service.

During the First World War, the school removed to Barton-on-Sea. In July 1915, it was renamed Harvington College, after parents voted in favour of "a British and not a foreign name". The school advertised that it provided "a thorough modern education for girls", preparing them for examinations, but also offering classes in "Cookery and Housewifery"; classes in special subjects were open to non-members. By 1923, Harvington College had expanded to occupy 20 to 26 Castlebar Road.

At the start of the Second World War, the school evacuated once again to Barton-on-Sea, and sold two of its four buildings to Middlesex County Council. In September 1940, Harvington School re-opened under new leadership. Florence Watson, who had remained headmistress for 48 years, and Chrystabel Watson announced that they would retire. The Watson sisters were replaced by two new principals, Mrs. H. K. M. Turner and Miss E. E. Emerton, who had both worked at the school for many years. Harvington School continued its boarding and day school for girls, while also introducing "a preparatory department for little boys and girls". However, it discontinued its domestic science programme.

After the war ended, Harvginton became a day school only. Frances M. Smith became headmistress in 1956. When Smith retired in 1970, she told the Middlesex County Times and Gazette that the school had been "saved" by parents who formed the Harvington School Educational Trust to raise money to purchase the school. The trust was formed under the guidance of Colonel Desmond Cable, an Ealing resident. Alan Gillett, a former pupil, became chairman of the board of governors starting in 1984.

The deputy head and former mayor of Ealing, Anita Fookes, took over as headteacher in 1988. In October 1990, the school celebrated its 100th anniversary with a centenary exhibition of school memorabilia and photographs, as well as an old girls' reunion. In 1992, Harvington announced that it was raising funds to re-acquire no. 24 Castlebar Road so that it could re-open a co-educational nursery school. By the mid-1990s, Durston House, a neighbouring independent boys' school, purchased no. 26 Castlebar Road from Harvington.

In 2010, Harvington closed its senior school, citing declining attendance due to its inability to compete with other schools offering a more varied curriculum. As of September 2023, Harvington Preparatory School closed and is now known as Durston House School, a co-education Prep School for Girls and Boys aged 3–13.

== Facilities ==
As of 2015, Harvington Prep was in three adjoining Victorian houses, equipped with a sports hall, science laboratory, and facilities for music, art, and drama.

== Rankings ==
In 2001, the Harvington preparatory school ranked 60th nationwide based on its Key Stage 2 results. In 2008, the Harvington senior school ranked 10th in The Sunday Times Top 10 small independent schools in Britain, tying with St Catherine's School, Twickenham, based on GCSE examination results.

== Notable former pupils ==
Alumnae of Harvington School are known as "Old Harvingtonians". Old Harvingtonians have included a former international lacrosse player for England, and a Foreign Office employee who was awarded an OBE. Other notable former pupils include:

- Alan Gillett, OBE, former chairman of the Harvington School board of governors, chairman of the Ealing Hospital NHS Trust, and president of the Ealing Rotary Club, who attended the nursery school in 1935
- Gladys Peto, illustrator and poster artist later known as Mrs. Gladys Emmerson
- Agnes Bryson Inglis Morrison, Scottish writer
