= Buckland, Kent =

Village in Kent, England

Coordinates: 51.1371°N 1.2952°E

Buckland
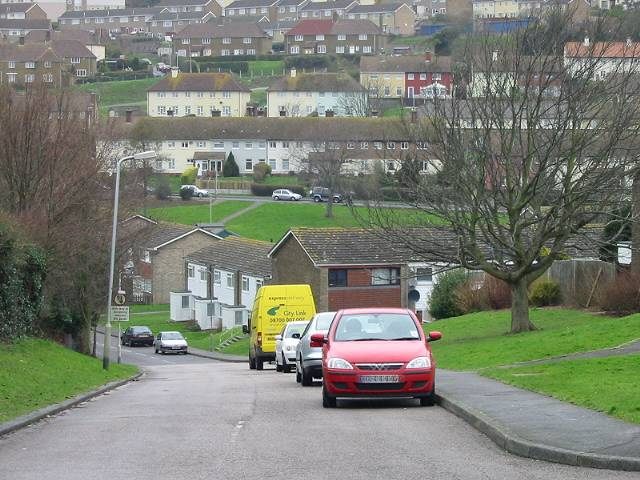

- Location within Kent
- Population: 7,580 (2011.Ward)
- OS grid reference: TR261501
- Civil parish: Dover
- District: Dover
- Shire county: Kent
- Region: South East
- Country: England
- Sovereign state: United Kingdom
- Post town: Dover
- Postcode district: CT17
- Dialling code: 01304
- Police: Kent
- Fire: Kent
- Ambulance: South East Coast
- UK Parliament: Dover and Deal

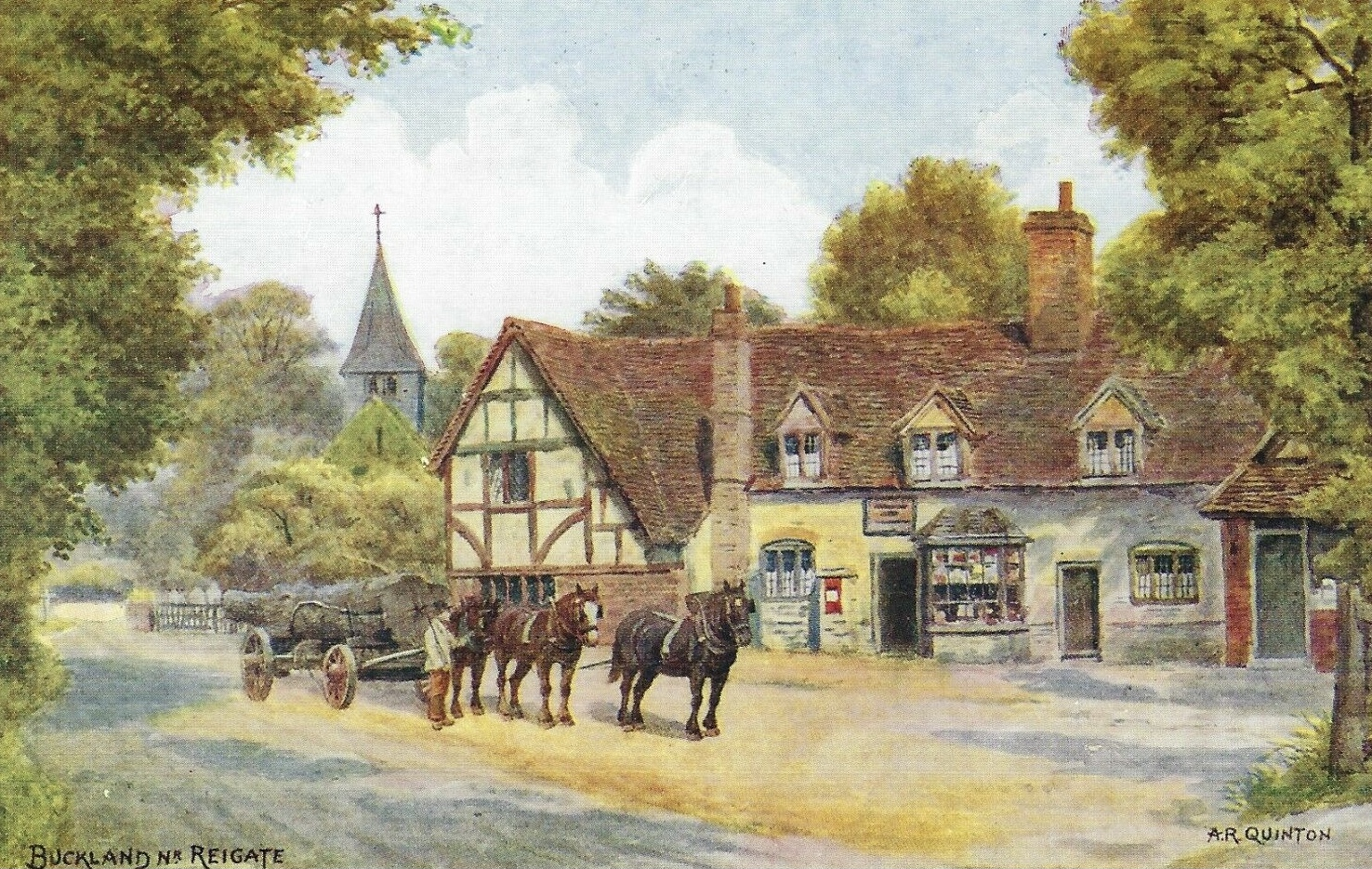
Buckland Nr. Reigate (postcard c1920) by A. R. Quinton

Buckland including Buckland Valley is a village near (and now merged with) Dover, in the county of Kent, England. It is noted for the Buckland Anglo-Saxon cemetery whose finds now belong to the British Museum but are on display at Dover Museum.

English railway contractor, Edward Betts, was born in Buckland.

== History ==
In 1891 the civil parish had a population of 4344. On 26 March 1896 the parish was abolished and merged with Dover.
