= Anne Harriet Fish =

British cartoonist and illustrator

Annie Fish
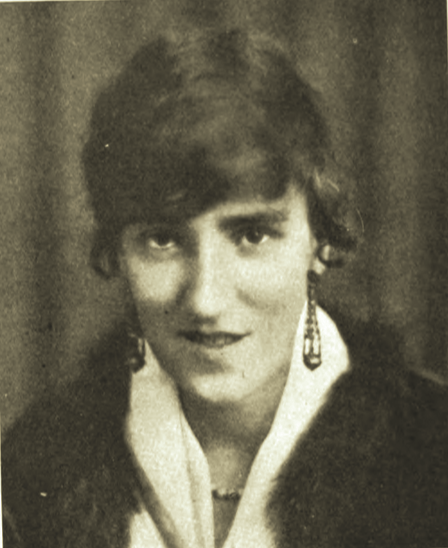
- Portrait photo in The Tatler, 1916
- Born: Anne Harriet Fish; 27 March 1890; Horfield, Bristol, England
- Died: 10 October 1964 (aged 74); Hayle, Cornwall, England
- Occupations: Cartoonist and illustrator
- Known for: Eve
- Spouse: Walter William Sefton

Annie Fish (27 March 1890 – 10 October 1964) was a British cartoonist and illustrator. Her illustration of "Eve" in The Tatler spawned films, theatre and books.

== Life ==
Fish was born in Horfield in Bristol in 1890 before her family moved to London. She became a cartoonist and illustrator after studying with C. M. Q. Orchardson, George Belcher and John Hassall. She went to work for the publisher John Lane. Her debut work was creating cartoons for Stephen Leacock's humorous book Behind the Beyond.

In total, Fish contributed to American Vanity Fair, Vogue, The Sketch, Eve, Punch, and Tatler. Her work was compared to Aubrey Beardsley although Fish noted that she did not see his work until after the comparison had been made. Her illustrations for the "Letters of Eve" in The Tatler spawned films, theatre and three books. The costumes imagined for Phyllis Dare when she played Eve at the Adelphi Theatre were said to have influenced ladies fashions. Gladys Emma Peto created drawings for "The letters of Phrynette" in The Sketch. This was so similar to "Letters of Eve" that there was a court case.

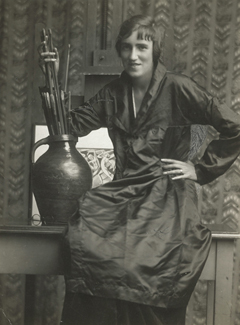
circa 1915

Eileen Molyneux appeared in a series of twelve short silent two reel films as "Eve" for Gaumont in 1918.

Fish was the illustrator of "Eve" until 1920 and after that the character continued to appear in Pan magazine illustrated by Jo White and later Dolly Tree. In 1922 she illustrated a luxury edition of Edward Fitzgerald's Rubaiyat of Omar Khayyam.

Fish retired to St Ives in the 1940s. Her husband, Walter William Sefton, died in 1952. She died in Hayle in Cornwall in 1964 after falling in the bath.

Phyllis Dare as Annie Fish's "Eve" in 1915

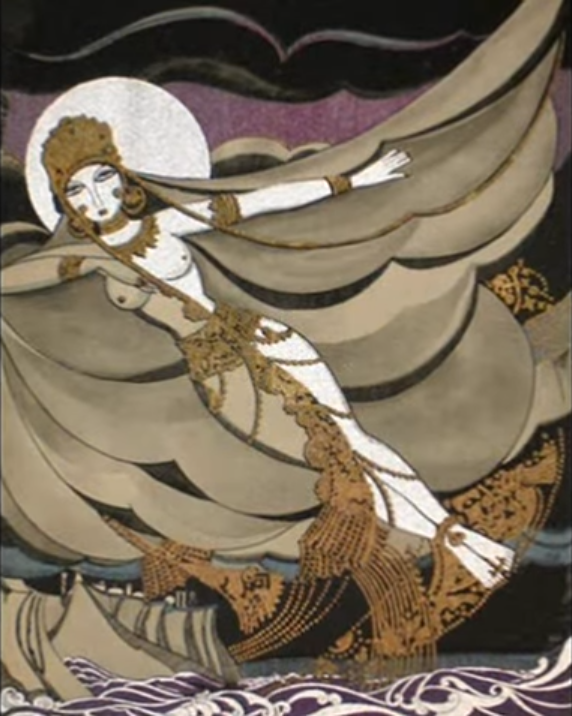
An illustration from Rubaiyat of Omar Khayyam
