= Peto and Betts =

British civil engineering partnership

Peto and Betts was a civil engineering partnership formed in 1848 between Morton Peto and Edward Ladd Betts that was mainly involved with the construction of railways in the UK and abroad.

At times, for particular projects, they joined in partnership with Thomas Brassey and Thomas Crampton.

== Background to the partnership ==
In 1834, Peto and his cousin Thomas Grissell went into partnership as railway contractors. However, Grissell became increasingly nervous of the risks taken by Peto, and in 1846 dissolved the partnership.

Betts' father, William Betts, was a successful contractor's agent and railway contractor. On William's retirement, Betts assumed full responsibility for the business.

Peto and Betts had known each other for some time and, indeed, Betts was married to Peto's sister, Ann. They had also worked together on part of the Great Northern Railway.

In 1848, they established a formal partnership and together they were to work on a large number of railway contracts.

== Other partnerships ==
For particular projects, Peto and Betts frequently joined in partnership with Thomas Brassey as Peto, Brassey and Betts.

For extensive work on the London, Chatham and Dover Railway, Peto and Betts joined in partnership with Thomas Crampton, the LCDR engineer.

== Major contracts ==
Between 1846 and 1855 the partnership carried out many large railway contracts both at home and abroad, including the South Eastern Line.

Either on their own account, or in partnership with Thomas Crampton, they carried out most of the construction of the London, Chatham and Dover lines.

Other railways were built by the Partnership in Denmark, Russia, Algeria, South America and Australia.

In the late 1850s the partnership helped to build the first railway in Algeria. Peto accompanied Napoleon III of France to the official opening of the line.

In partnership with Thomas Brassey they built the following:

- the Grand Trunk Railway in Canada, possibly the greatest enterprise of this trio. Betts undertook the actual management of the venture which included the Victoria bridge across the Saint Lawrence River at Montreal.
- the London, Tilbury and Southend line.
- the Grand Crimean Central Railway between Balaklava and Sevastopol

Peto and Betts themselves were amenable to major risky speculation; for example, to expedite the building of the London, Tilbury and Southend Railway, the partnership undertook to lease it as operators for twenty-one years from the opening in 1854, a speculation said in 1863 to be losing £24,000 a year (equivalent to £2,610,000 in 2025).

== Insolvency ==
=== Background ===
In the 1860s, the partnership agreed to build a line between London Bridge and Victoria for the London, Chatham and Dover Railway (LCDR) and to be paid entirely in the company's shares and debentures. To raise the funding for the construction they became involved in complicated finance-raising schemes, and with their overseas operations hindered by war, they overstretched themselves.

=== Overend, Gurney and Company ===
The partnership's principal bank was Overend, Gurney and Company. As a consequence of a run on the bank caused by persistent rumours and speculation in the London financial markets, the bank closed its doors and ceased trading at 3pm, 10 May 1866.

=== Effect on the partnership ===
The collapse of Overend, Gurney and Company was disastrous for the partnership and the next day the partnership suspended trading. Indeed, the partnership was probably the most prominent casualty of the collapse of the bank and the ensuing banking crisis. At the time the partnership was suspended there were 20,000 men in their employment.

In a public statement Peto and Betts declared, "We much regret to find ourselves under the painful necessity of allowing our acceptances to be returned, owing wholly to the disappointment of the arrangements we have made for their provision, which have been defeated by the unexpected turn which has taken place in the money market within the last few days." The statement went on to say that Peto and Betts thought the cash shortfall of the partnership was temporary and given a little time they would be able to liquidate sufficient assets and be able to pay off their debts.

Initially, the cash shortfall was thought to be "not above half a million"

=== London, Chatham and Dover Railway ===
Peto and Betts optimism was misplaced. In the ensuing crisis, railway stocks were particularly badly affected and the London, Chatham and Dover Railway (LCDR) became insolvent Consequently, the shares that the partnership had been paid in became worthless. Furthermore, the illegal loan schemes that they had been involved in at the LCDR ruined their reputations. The new management of the resurrected LCDR resolved to pursue the partnership and Peto and Betts personally, eventually making a claim against them for a "staggering" £6,661,941 19s 1d. (equivalent to £685,610,000 in 2025). The LCDR later reduced their claim, their solicitor declaring, “Whether my clients had a proof upon the proceedings of £360,000 or for £6,600,000, the result would, unfortunately be the same – in neither case would there be any dividend."

=== Aftermath ===
The partnership was unable to pay their creditors and became insolvent in the following year.

Neither Peto nor Betts' reputations for financial propriety recovered from the LCDR debacle. Both died in obscurity, Betts in 1872 and Peto in 1889. The partnership insolvency rumbled on with the final dividend meeting, making payments to their creditors being held on 6 June 1898, over 30 years after the insolvency commenced.
