= John Ternouth =

English sculptor (1796–1848)

John Ternouth (1796–1848) was an English sculptor of the early 19th century. His most notable work is one of the four panels at the base of Nelson's Column in London's Trafalgar Square, depicting the Battle of Copenhagen.

== Life ==
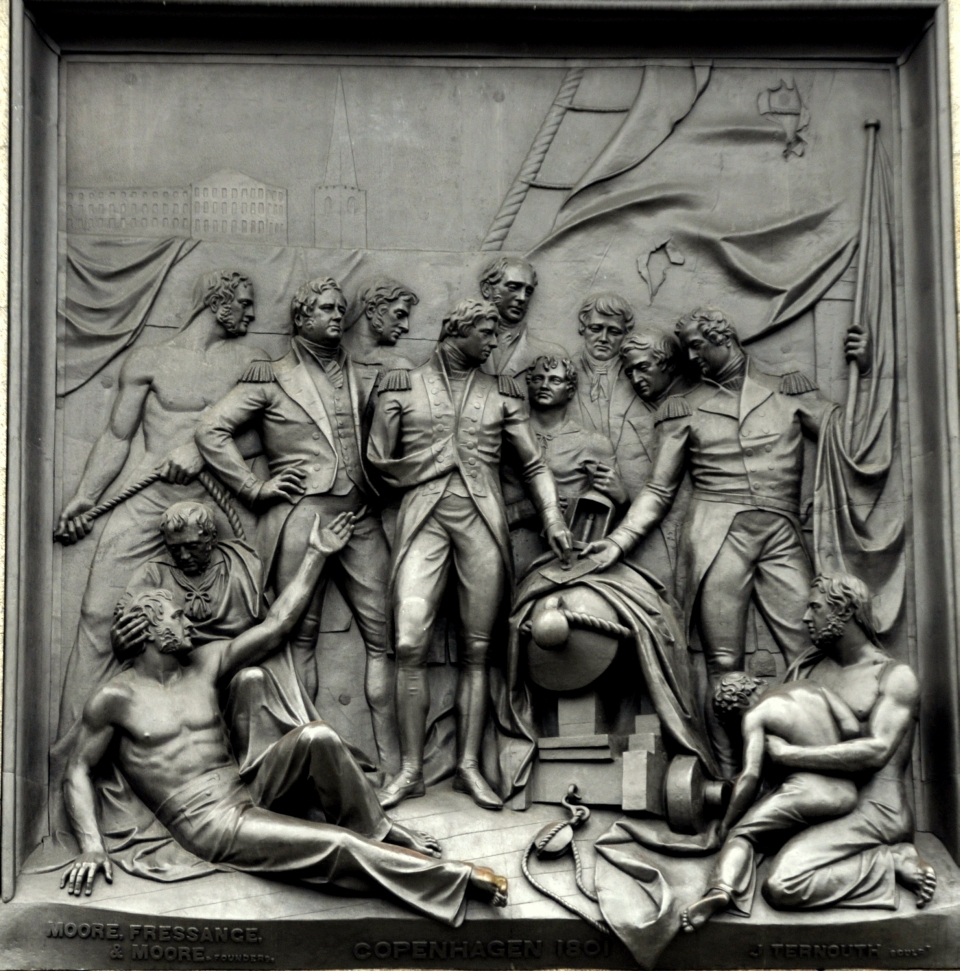
Ternouth's relief of The Battle of Copenhagen on the pedestal of Nelson’s Column

John Ternouth was descended from a family of Plymouth stonemasons. He was born in Andover, Hampshire, on 30 January 1796, and moved to London in around 1810. He entered the Royal Academy Schools in 1820 and later studied under Sir Francis Chantrey. While still working in Chantrey's studio, he also built up a practice as a sculptor in his own name, making busts and funerary monuments. His works include a statue of John Murray, 4th Duke of Atholl in Dunkeld Cathedral, and a monument to Bishop Allen in Ely Cathedral. He exhibited regularly at the Royal Academy from 1819 onward, mostly showing portrait busts. He also showed works at the British Institution in 1825, and at the Society of British Artists between 1825 and 1838.

From 1842 he was employed in cleaning and restoring the monuments in Westminster Abbey. He had been recommended to this post by the architect Edward Blore, who also employed him to carve figures of St George and Britannia at Buckingham Palace.

In 1844 he sent a sculpture entitled "The Penitent" and a statue of Thomas Henry Somerset Conway, an officer in the Madras Army, to the exhibition held at Westminster Hall to select artists to provide works of art for the new Palace of Westminster.

His best known work is "The Battle of Copenhagen", one of the four bronze reliefs on the pedestal of Nelson’s Column in Trafalgar Square. The choice of sculptors was influenced by the results of the 1844 Westminster Hall exhibition, and Ternouth was recommended for this commission by the prime minister, Sir Robert Peel. While Ternouth was still at work on the relief, he found it necessary to publicly rebut rumours that he had died. The plaster relief was ready by June 1848, and Prince Albert visited Ternouth’s studio to inspect it on 1 July 1848.

He died of typhus on 13 December 1848 and was buried in Kensal Green Cemetery.
