= Durston House =

Durston House School
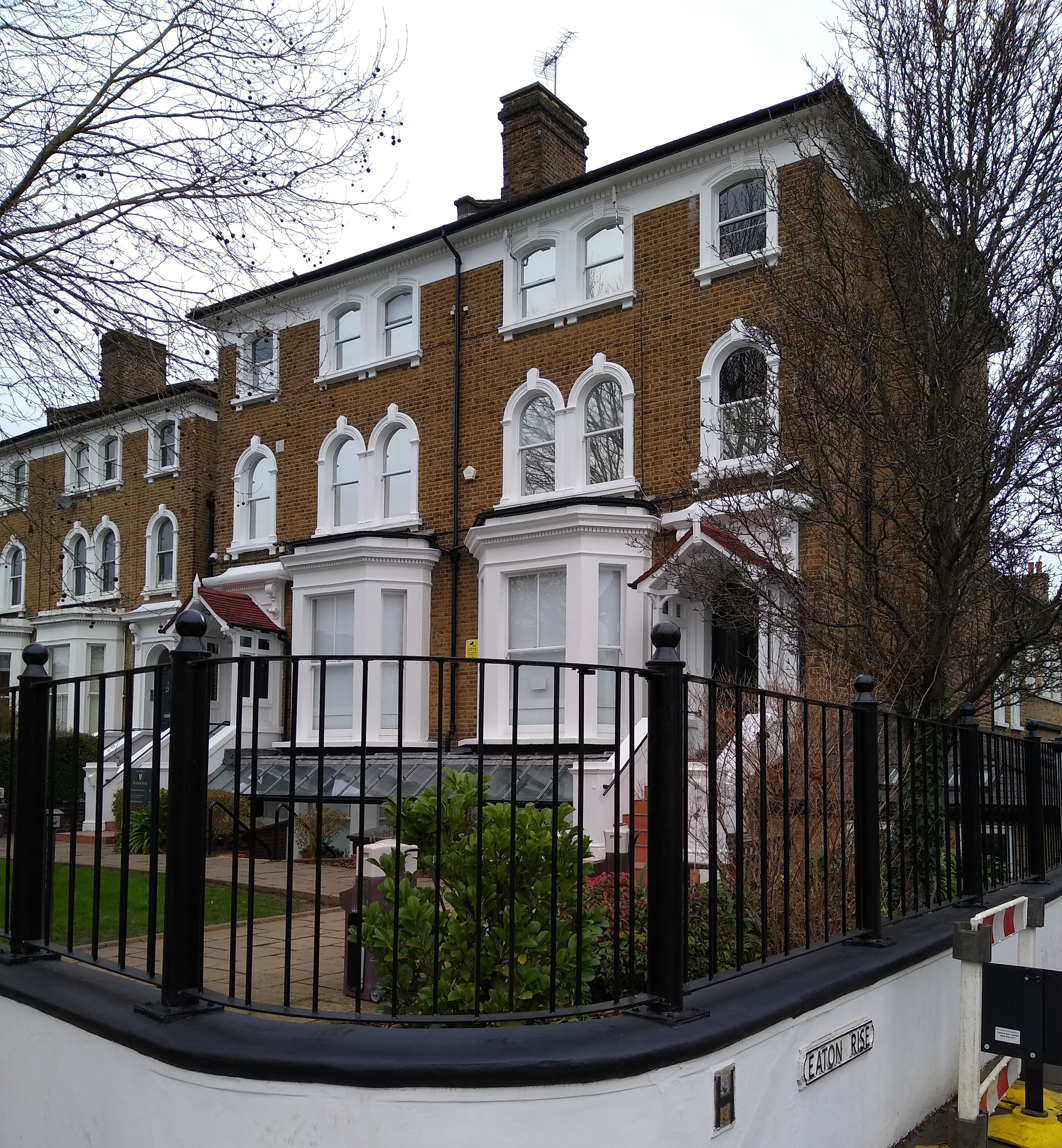

Location
- 12–14 Castlebar Road; Ealing, London, W5 2DR; England
- Coordinates: 51.516644°N 0.306670°W

Information
- Type: Private preparatory day school
- Religious affiliation: All faiths
- Established: 1886
- Founders: Ben and Robert Pearce
- Department for Education URN: 101944 Tables
- Headmaster: Giles Entwisle
- Years offered: Pre-School to Year 8
- Gender: Co-educational
- Age: 3 to 13
- Houses: Arundel, Conway, Warwick, Windsor
- Colours: Green and black
- Affiliation: St Paul's School Group
- Former pupils: Old Durstonians
- Website: www.durstonhouse.org

Durston House School is an independent preparatory day school in Ealing, west London, for children aged 3 to 13. Founded in 1886, it was a boys school until its 2023 merger with Harvington School, after which it became co-educational. In November 2025 it became a founding member of the St Paul's School Group, alongside St Paul's School and Shrewsbury House School Trust.

== History ==
=== Foundation ===
The brothers Ben and Robert Pearce founded Durston House in 1886 as a Christian school. It was run on a proprietary basis for its first century. Durston House School Educational Trust Limited, the educational charity established to run the school, was incorporated in 1985 and registered as a charity in 1986, the school's centenary year.

=== Merger with Harvington School ===
Giles Entwisle became headmaster in September 2020, taking over from long-serving headmaster Ian Kendrick who had announced his retirement the year before.

In April 2022, Durston House and the neighbouring Harvington Preparatory School announced they would merge to create a co-educational preparatory school in Ealing. The merger took effect on 1 September 2023, when Durston House admitted girls for the first time and opened a pre-school for children aged three and above.

=== St Paul's School Group ===
In November 2025, St Paul's School announced the formation of the St Paul's School Group, with Durston House and Shrewsbury House School Trust as founding members. The group was constituted by a change-of-control agreement completed in October 2025 and took effect on 31 December 2025. According to the group FAQ, the assets of the prep school charities transferred to St Paul's School, although Durston House continued to operate under its own name, brand, leadership and budget.

Under the group's governance arrangements, the heads of the prep schools report to the High Master of St Paul's School, and members of the St Paul's governing body sit on each prep school's governing body. Following the formation of the group, Durston House announced that existing girls and those holding places for September 2026 or 2027 would continue as planned, while from September 2028 it would admit girls only up to Year 2.

== School ==
Durston House occupies five sites on Castlebar Road in Ealing, with its main address at 12–14 Castlebar Road. The school has two playing fields with pavilions and floodlit tennis and basketball courts: Castlebar, within five minutes' walk of the school, and Swyncombe in Hounslow, about ten minutes by car. Together they provide 6.75 acres of sports grounds. The school also has specialist art rooms and science laboratories. An annual Carol Service and Spring Concert are held at the nearby St Peter's Church.

It is registered with the Department for Education as an other independent school. Durston House is a member of the Independent Association of Prep Schools, the Independent Schools Council, the Association of Governing Bodies of Independent Schools and the Independent Schools' Bursars Association.

== Inspection ==
The Independent Schools Inspectorate inspected Durston House in October 2025 and reported that the school met the Independent School Standards and other applicable regulatory requirements. A material-change inspection in November 2023 had followed the school's expansion to include younger children and girls after the Harvington merger.
