= Edward Betts =

English civil engineering contractor (1815–72)

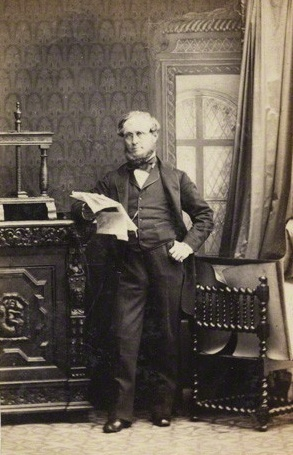
- Historical photo of Edward Betts; National Portrait Gallery, London
- Born: 15 June 1815; Buckland, Dover, Kent, England
- Died: 21 January 1872 (aged 56); Aswan, Egypt
- Occupation: Civil engineering contractor
- Spouse: Ann Peto
- Children: Eight
- Parent(s): William Betts, Elizabeth Haywood

Edward Ladd Betts (5 June 1815 – 21 January 1872) was an English civil engineering contractor who was mainly involved in the building of railways.

== Early life ==
Edward Betts was born at Buckland, near Dover, son of William Betts (1790–1867), a successful contractor's agent and railway contractor.

He was apprenticed to a builder at Lincoln. However, becoming more interested in engineering, he then worked as agent for Hugh McIntosh building the Black Rock lighthouse at Beaumaris, Anglesey.

== Railway contractor ==
Edward Betts's first railway undertaking was to supervise the building of the Dutton Viaduct on the Grand Junction Railway for Hugh McIntosh under George Stephenson as engineer. After the death of McIntosh in 1840, William Betts & Sons—the family firm now named for Edward and his father—gained contracts on the South Eastern Railway for stretches that included the Marsden-Ashford line, Maidstone Branch, and the Saltwood tunnel. They also obtained large contracts on behalf of David McIntosh for the Midlands County Railway, whereby the Betts family relocated to Leicester, and for the Manchester-Birmingham Railway. After that, Betts continued to gain contracts, especially in the Chester area.

Upon his father's retirement at Bevois Mount, Southampton in 1845, Betts assumed full responsibility for the Betts company business.

Separately, the partnership between the major civil engineering contractors Samuel Morton Peto and Thomas Grissell was dissolved in 1846, and so Betts worked with Peto on parts of the Great Northern Railway.

== Peto and Betts ==
In 1848, Peto and Betts established a formal partnership and together they were to work on a large number of railway contracts.

Frequently, they also working in partnership with Thomas Brassey as Peto, Brassey and Betts. Possibly the greatest enterprise of this trio was the building of the Grand Trunk Railway in Canada. Betts undertook the actual management of the venture which included the Victoria bridge across the Saint Lawrence River at Montreal.

=== The Grand Crimean Central Railway ===
Peto, Betts and Brassey built at great speed the Grand Crimean Central Railway which enabled supplies, particularly heavy ammunition, to be transported from Balaclava to the British troops engaged in the siege of Sevastopol in the Crimean War. Betts in particular was responsible for obtaining the enormous amount of supplies and equipment, the fleet of ships to convey them from England to the Black Sea and the navvies and skilled workers needed to carry out the work, also in a very short period of time.

== Domestic and civil ==
In 1843, Betts married Ann Peto (19 September 1820 – 23 January 1908), the sister of Samuel Morton Peto. Both are interred in the family vault in the churchyard of St Peter and St Paul's Parish Church, Aylesford. Their children were:

1. Edward Peto Betts (born 1845) sometimes referred to as Edward Ladd Betts.
2. Elizabeth Peto Betts (22 October 1846 — 1 March 1940) interred in the family vault at Aylesford.
3. Morton Peto Betts (30 August 1847 – 19 April 1914), a leading English sportsman of the time. He was notable for scoring the first goal in an English FA Cup Final.
4. Alice Peto Betts (born 1849)
5. Ernest William Peto Betts (29 October 1850 – 12 November 1932) was ordained as a Church of England minister and officiated at the weddings of his siblings Morton and Ann.
6. Percy Campbell Betts (b. 7 January 1856 – 14 October 1878) accidentally shot himself at home while cleaning a revolver. Interred in the family vault at Aylesford.
7. Herbert Peto Betts (born 1857) was ordained as a Church of England minister and officiated at his sister Ann's wedding.
8. Ann Gertrude Betts (born 1858)

Around 1850 Betts bought a 'palatial residence', Preston Hall near Aylesford in Kent, and had it rebuilt in a Jacobean style, where he employed a staff of 18. Also in the 1850s, he acquired a London home at 29 Tavistock Square where he employed a further 8 servants and by 1860 he had moved to Great George Street, Westminster. In 1858, already a magistrate and a Deputy Lieutenant, he became High Sheriff of Kent. In the general election of 1865, he contested the Maidstone seat as a Conservative but was unsuccessful.

== Later work ==
Betts and Peto had always been amenable to major speculation; for example, once they had built the London, Tilbury and Southend Railway, they leased it as operators for twenty-one years from the opening in 1854, a speculation said in 1863 to be losing £24,000 a year (equivalent to £2,610,000 in 2025).

In the 1860s, Betts and Peto agreed to build a line between London Bridge and Victoria for the London, Chatham and Dover Railway and to be paid entirely in the company's shares and debentures. To raise the funding for the construction they became involved in complicated finance-raising schemes, and with their overseas operations hindered by war, they overstretched themselves. Consequently, Betts and Peto were probably the most prominent casualties of the collapse of the bank Overend, Gurney and Company and the ensuing banking crisis when railway stocks were particularly badly affected and the London, Chatham and Dover Railway became insolvent and therefore the shares they had been paid in became worthless. They were unable to pay their creditors and became insolvent in the following year.

Only minor works were to follow for Betts; small alterations to the Metropolitan Railway and an abortive attempt to improve the navigation of the River Danube.

== Later life ==
After his bankruptcy, Betts was forced to sell Preston Hall (to his friend, Thomas Brassey) and moved to The Holmwood, Bickley Park, near Bromley, Kent "... where he could still maintain a carriage." For the sake of his health he was sent by his doctors to Egypt in 1871 but he died the following year in Aswan. His estate was valued at less than £16,000.
