= Coal-tax post =

Boundary marker posts in southern England

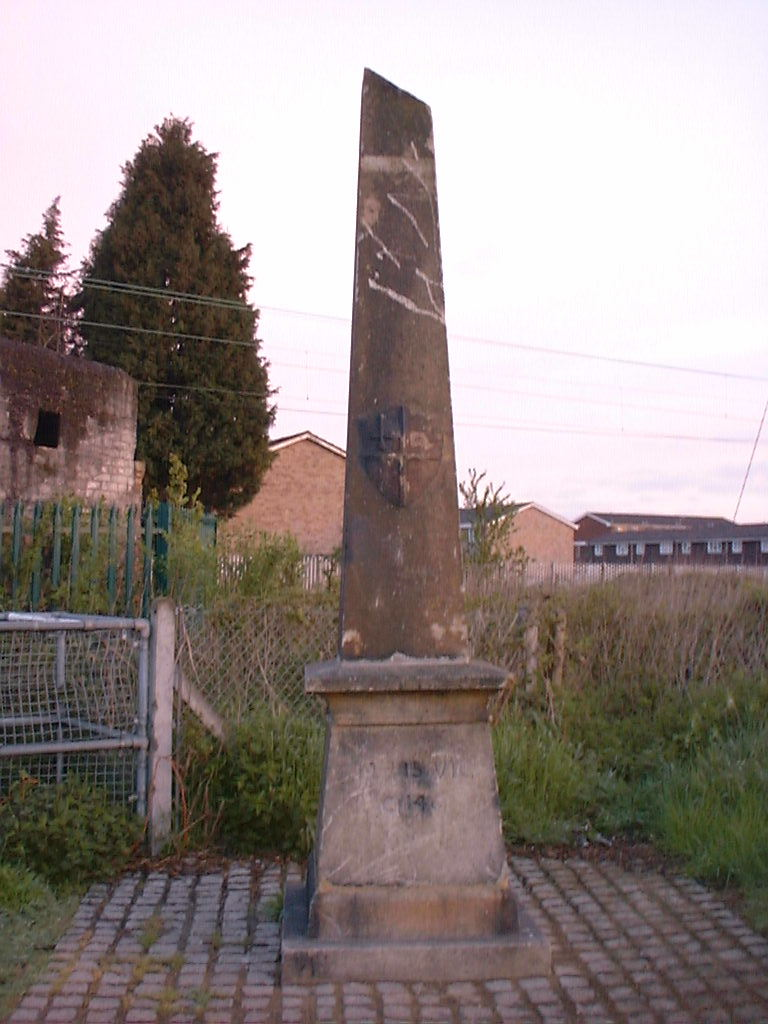
Coal-tax obelisk by the railway at Wormley, Hertfordshire. The inscription reads: 14 & 15 VIC C 146, showing that it was originally erected on the 1851 boundary before later being moved to the 1861 boundary.

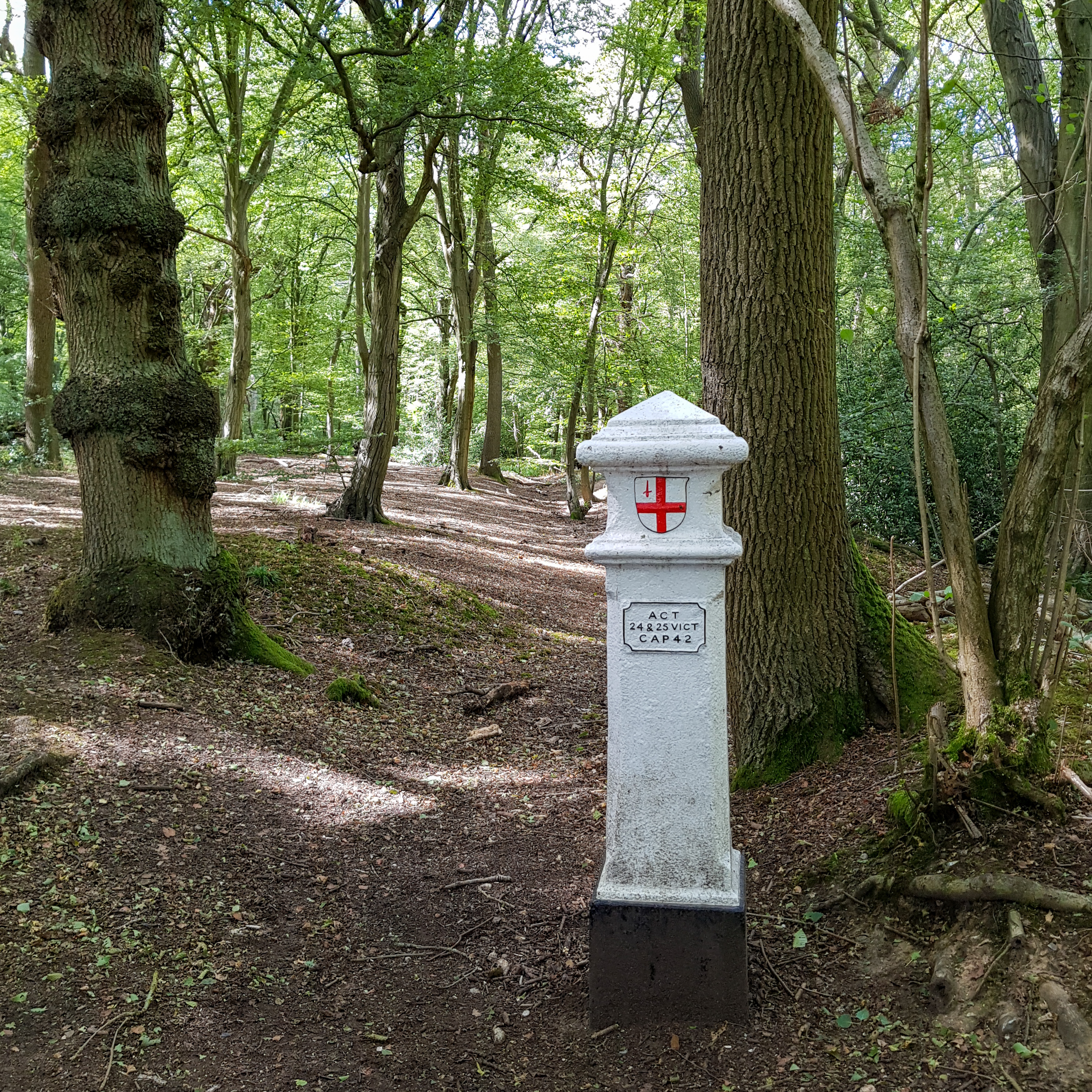
No byway was too small to evade the liability for coal tax. This cast-iron post is on a footpath in Wormley Wood, Hertfordshire.

Coal-tax posts are boundary marker posts found in southern England. They were erected in the 1860s and form an irregular loop between 12 and 18 miles from London to mark the points where taxes on coal were due to the Corporation of London. There were originally around 280 posts of which around 210 remain.

== History ==
Coal imported into the City of London had been taxed since medieval times and, as it was originally all brought by sea to riverside wharfs, the collection of the duties was relatively easy. The City is a small (one square mile) but influential and rich part of London. The Port of London, within which the duties were payable, stretched far beyond the boundaries of the City, all the way along the Thames from Yantlet Creek (downstream from Gravesend) to Staines.

Coal Duty, London Act 1845
- Act of Parliament
- Parliament of the United Kingdom
- Long title: An Act to continue until the Fifth Day of July One thousand eight hundred and sixty-two the Acts for regulating the Vend and Delivery of Coals in London and Westminster, and in certain Parts of the adjacent Counties; and to alter and amend the said Acts.
- Citation: 8 & 9 Vict. c. 101
- Territorial extent: United Kingdom

Dates
- Royal assent: 4 August 1845
- Commencement: 4 August 1845 (Note: The Acts of Parliament (Commencement) Act 1793.)
- Repealed: 22 September 1893
Other legislation
Amends	London, Westminster and Home Counties Coal Trade Act 1831; London and Westminster Coal Trade Act 1838
Repealed by	Statute Law Revision (No. 2) Act 1893

Status: Repealed

Text of statute as originally enacted

Coal Duties (London and Westminster and Adjacent Counties) Act 1851
- Act of Parliament
- Parliament of the United Kingdom
- Long title: An Act to amend the Acts relating to the Vend and Delivery of Coals in London and Westminster, and in certain Parts of the adjacent Counties; and to allow a Drawback on Coals conveyed beyond certain Limits.
- Citation: 14 & 15 Vict. c. cxlvi
- Territorial extent: United Kingdom

Dates
- Royal assent: 8 August 1851
- Commencement: 8 August 1851
- Repealed: 21 July 2008
Other legislation
Repealed by	Statute Law (Repeals) Act 2008

Status: Repealed

By the 19th century, however, there was increasing trade by canal and rail, and various acts of Parliament extended the catchment area to include these new modes of transport. The Coal Duty, London Act 1845 (8 & 9 Vict. c. 101) set the boundary at a radius of 20 miles from the General Post Office, London, from Langley in the west to Gravesend in the east and from Ware in the north to Redhill in the south. The Coal Duties (London and Westminster and Adjacent Counties) Act 1851 (14 & 15 Vict. c. cxlvi) permitted the erection of boundary markers to indicate where this boundary lay; and about fifty markers, inscribed with a reference to the act, were erected.

London Coal and Wine Duties Continuance Act 1861 (Note: Section 11.)
- Act of Parliament
- Parliament of the United Kingdom
- Long title: An Act to continue the Duties levied on Coal and Wine by the Corporation of London.
- Citation: 24 & 25 Vict. c. 42
- Territorial extent: United Kingdom

Dates
- Royal assent: 22 July 1861
- Commencement: 22 July 1861
- Repealed: 20 June 1892
Other legislation
Repealed by	Statute Law Revision Act 1892

Status: Repealed

Text of statute as originally enacted

A further act – the London Coal and Wine Duties Continuance Act 1861 (24 & 25 Vict. c. 42) – was passed, reducing the area to that of the Metropolitan Police District plus the City of London. This stretched from Colnbrook in the west to Crayford Ness, at the mouth of the River Darent, in the east, and from Wormley, Hertfordshire, in the north to Banstead Heath, Surrey, in the south. New marker posts (about 280) were erected to show the boundary within which the duty was payable. These again cite the act by regnal year and chapter number, i.e. 24 & 25 Vict. c. 42. In some cases, notably on railways and canals, markers made for earlier acts were reused on the new boundary. Most (over 200) of these posts survive. Although the title of the act refers to wine duties, these were collected only in the Port of London: the boundary marks have no connection with the wine duties and it is incorrect to call them "coal and wine duty posts".

The purpose of the posts was to give notice of where the boundary ran so that no-one could claim ignorance of liability to pay the duties. However, in general, duties were not actually collected on the boundary. A known exception was the Grand Junction Canal: originally customs officers collected the duties at Grove Park, Hertfordshire. After the boundary was changed in 1861 a permanent house for the collector was built at Stockers Lock near Rickmansworth. The Queens Head Public House in High Street, Colney Heath, has a post standing close by and it has a "canted front bay said to have been used for the collection of coal tax". In other cases the railway and canal companies or local coal merchants calculated the sums due and paid the money to the Corporation. The railway companies were initially allowed some coal free of duty for their engines.

== Types of post ==
There are five different forms of coal duty boundary markers in all.

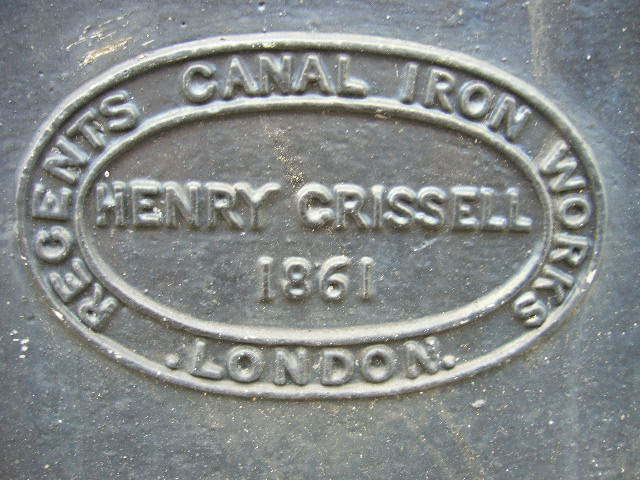
Henry Grissell's maker's mark on a Type 2 post

1. Granite obelisks, about 4 feet (1.2 m) high, erected beside canals and navigable rivers.
2. Cast-iron posts about 4 ft (1.2 m) high. These form the majority of posts and are found beside roads – and also beside tracks and footpaths, sometimes in open countryside. They were cast by Henry Grissell at his Regents Canal iron works.
3. Cast-iron boxes or plates, about 9 inches (230 mm) square, built into parapets of road bridges.
4. Stone or cast-iron obelisks, about 15 ft (4.6 m) high, found beside railways. Originally erected on previous boundaries and reused on the 1861 boundary.
5. Cast-iron obelisks, about 6 ft (1.8 m) high, erected on railways after 1865.

Almost all bear the City's shield or in some cases the full coat of arms. Most of the cast-iron posts are painted white, with the cross and sword of the shield picked out in red, but the stone ones are often of a sombre black, still bearing the stains accumulated on the smoky trackside. Most of the posts are Grade II listed buildings.

== How the duties were used ==
The City of London had the right to collect dues for weighing and measuring coal entering the Port of London since medieval times. After the Great Fire of London in 1666, Acts of Parliament imposed further duties to help pay for the rebuilding. Although some of the proceeds were for general rebuilding purposes, most was to cover the costs of rebuilding St Paul's Cathedral and the City churches. After the completion of St Paul's, the duties were paid to the Commission for Building Fifty New Churches. In 1718 the duty was converted into a Government duty, though some was still used for ecclesiastical purposes, such as the rebuilding of Gravesend Church in 1730. During the Napoleonic Wars, the duty was increased several times to help pay for the wars. Government duties on coal were abolished in 1831.

Orphans, London Act 1694
- Act of Parliament
- Parliament of England
- Long title: An Act for Relief of the Orphans and other Creditors of the City of London.
- Citation: 5 & 6 Will. & Mar. c. 10
- Territorial extent: England and Wales

Dates
- Royal assent: 23 March 1694
- Commencement: 24 June 1694 (Note: Section 1.)
- Repealed: 31 January 2013
Other legislation
Repealed by	Statute Law (Repeals) Act 2013

Status: Repealed

Text of statute as originally enacted

At the end of the 17th century, the City of London owed large sums, notably to the funds which they held on trust for the orphans of City Freemen. In 1694 the City persuaded Parliament to the Orphans, London Act 1694 (5 & 6 Will. & Mar. c. 10) which allowed it to raise money in various ways, including the imposition of duties on coal. This act was the ancestor of the ones which set up the posts. In the middle of the 18th century the income from the duties started to be used to finance public works in London, not only in the City itself but also in surrounding areas such as the West End, Southwark and Whitechapel. These included bridges such as Blackfriars Bridge, road improvements such as at Temple Bar and the Ratcliffe Highway, and court buildings such as the Old Bailey and the Middlesex Sessions House in Clerkenwell. In 1803 a further duty was introduced to pay for the expenses of the coal market in London.

The use of the coal duties to pay for public works continued in the nineteenth century: for example they paid for the rebuilding of the Royal Exchange and the construction of New Oxford Street. After creation of the Metropolitan Board of Works (MBW) in 1855 the major part of duties went to the board and were used to pay for the creation of a unified sewerage system in London and the construction of the Thames embankments. The City's portion of the duties paid for the building of Cannon Street, and later of Holborn Viaduct.

In the 1870s the duties were used to free from toll a number of bridges on the Thames: Kew, Kingston upon Thames, Hampton Court, Walton upon Thames, and Staines, together with Chingford, and Tottenham Mills on the Lea.

== The end of the duties ==
The coal duties had always been unpopular and were the subject of attacks by pamphleteers (for example Joseph Bottomley Firth in 1887) throughout their life. Objection was taken to a tax on a basic necessity and the anomaly of a tax in London which did not apply to the rest of the country. The greater anomaly was that the area of collection – the Metropolitan Police District – was so much larger than the area in which they were spent: the Metropolitan Board of Works covered much the same area as its successor the London County Council. With the growth of the outer suburbs, their residents resented paying a tax which had very little direct benefit for them. This is why in 1868 Parliament decided that the duties were to be used to free from toll bridges in outer London.

London Coal Duties Abolition Act 1889 (Note: Section 3.)
- Act of Parliament
- Parliament of the United Kingdom
- Long title: An Act to abolish any Duties on Coals leviable by the Corporation of London.
- Citation: 52 & 53 Vict. c. 17
- Territorial extent: United Kingdom

Dates
- Royal assent: 9 July 1889
- Commencement: 9 July 1889 (Note: The Acts of Parliament (Commencement) Act 1793.)
- Repealed: 27 May 1976
Other legislation
Repealed by	Statute Law (Repeals) Act 1976

Status: Repealed

Text of statute as originally enacted

In the 1880s the City and the MBW wanted the duties to continue, in the face of growing opposition from the public and national politicians, but when the MBW was replaced by the London County Council in 1889, the new council declined to support renewal. The London Coal Duties Abolition Act 1889 (52 & 53 Vict. c. 17) was passed abolishing the duties, the last of which was collected in 1890. The abolition was opposed with some underhand tactics: a parliamentary select committee sitting in 1887 found that signatures on a petition in support of keeping the tax had been forged.

The posts thus represent the final phase of the duties in the face of growing opposition. They had been collected for over 300 years but within 30 years of the posts going up were abolished.

By 1912, the folklorist T. E. Lones reported that an obelisk by the River Colne, near Watford, had become the subject of what would now be called an urban legend:

Although the real purpose of the obelisk has been explained in the local newspaper, and is now known to many, the proximity of the structure to the river Colne has induced others to associate it with some drowning fatality, and during the past twenty years I have repeatedly heard people say that it was erected in memory of children drowned near the bridge.

== See also ==
- The London Stone in Staines is very much older but lies on the 1861 boundary
- Close-up image of the shield
- Two posts near Tattenham Corner
