= Alan Gillett (surveyor) =

English chartered surveyor

Professor Alan Gillett, hosting an event at St Mary's Perivale. He was instrumental in saving this ancient church from destruction.

Alan Henry Puckridge Gillett, OBE (born 30 October 1930) is a chartered surveyor who became Master of the Worshipful Company of Chartered Surveyors. Upon retiring from that occupation in 1995, he became Chairman of the Ealing Hospital NHS Trust and was a visiting professor at Kingston University. He has been active in a variety of other associations and, in 2008, was appointed an Officer of the Order of the British Empire for his services to the Royal Institution of Chartered Surveyors and the community of Ealing, where he was born and still resides.

== Early life and education ==
He was born in Ealing and started his education there at Harvington School, followed by Harrow View Preparatory School. In September 1940, he evacuated with his school to a home near Banbury, Oxfordshire, which now belongs to Michael Heseltine.

He subsequently attended Marlborough College and Clare College, Cambridge, where he read land economy. He was also a member of the Footlights drama club and drew cartoons for the student newspaper, Varsity.

He did national service in Egypt, during which time he was promoted from a cadet to 2nd Lieutenant within the Royal Corps of Engineers on the 30th October 1949. He was called up from the reserves in 1956 to serve again in Egypt during the Suez Crisis. He had recently married his wife Patricia at that time and their first son, Andrew, had been born earlier that year. They subsequently had two more sons and two daughters.

== Professional career ==
Gillett joined the family business as a chartered surveyor, working in this role in and around the City of London, and concluded his career as a senior partner of the firm Kemsley, Whiteley & Ferris. He was active in the Royal Institution of Chartered Surveyors, of which he became a fellow, and became master of the livery company for the profession, the Worshipful Company of Chartered Surveyors. He was the first Chairman of the Pyramus and Thisbe Club which he helped found to develop professional expertise in the structural and legal aspects of party walls. He was a visiting professor at Kingston University in their School of Surveying.

== Civic life ==
He has been active in a variety of associations and community organisations, especially in the borough of Ealing. He was chairman of the Ealing Hospital NHS Trust and a member of Ealing Symphony Orchestra. He was a founder member and chairman of the Friends of St Mary's – an organisation dedicated to the preservation and use of the 12th-century church, St Mary's in Perivale. From 1984, he served as chairman of the board of governors of Harvington School.
