= Morton Peto =

British politician and railway contractor (1809–89)

Sir Samuel Morton Peto, Bt
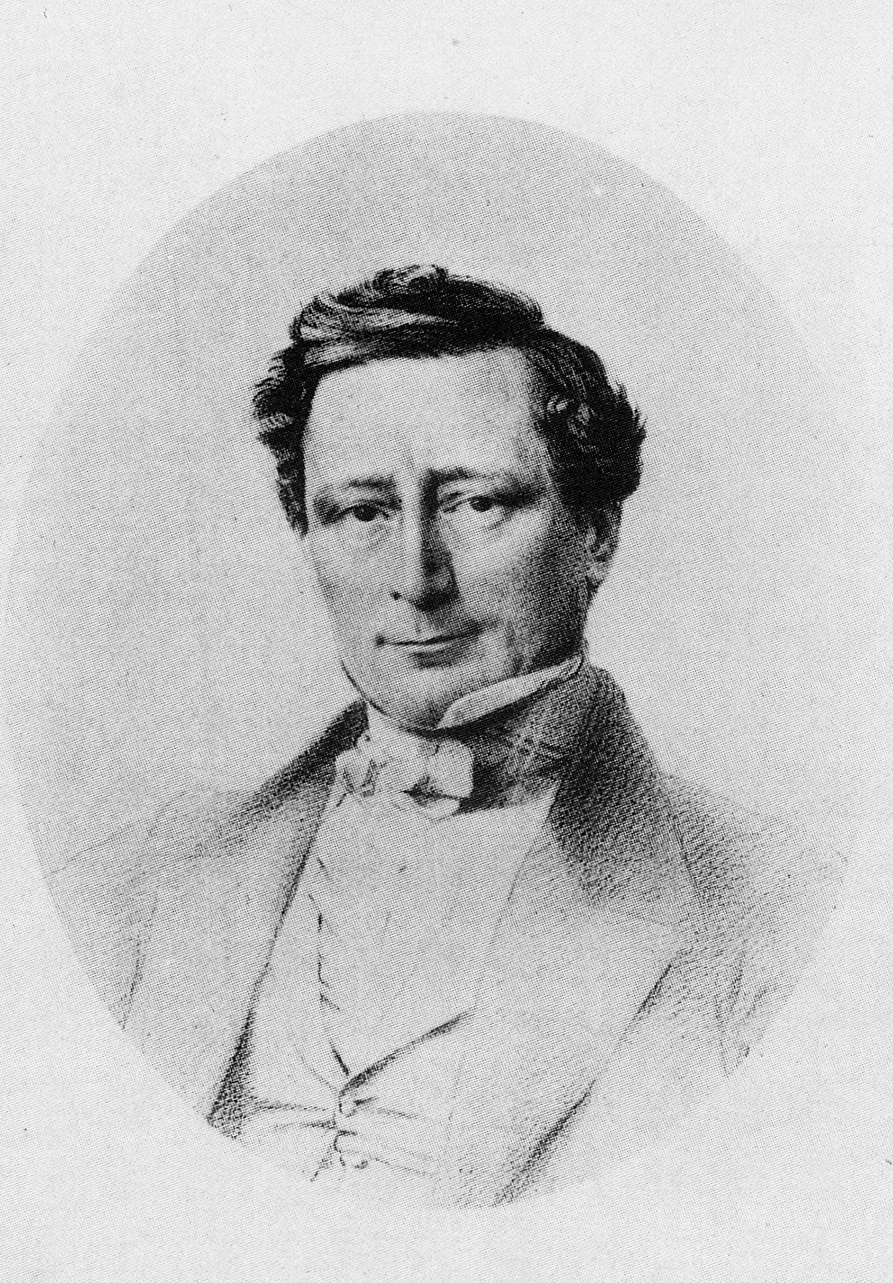
- Born: Samuel Morton Peto; 4 August 1809; Woking, Surrey, England
- Died: 13 November 1889 (aged 80)
- Occupation: Civil engineering contractor
- Spouse(s): Mary Grissell (four children); Sarah Ainsworth Kelsall (11 children)
- Children: 15

Sir Samuel Morton Peto, 1st Baronet (4 August 1809 – 13 November 1889) was an English entrepreneur, civil engineer and railway developer, and, for more than 20 years, a Member of Parliament (MP). A partner in the firm of Grissell and Peto, he managed construction firms that built many of London's major buildings and monuments, including the Reform Club, The Lyceum Theatre, Nelson's Column and the replacement Houses of Parliament - commissions which brought him great wealth. The scale of his operations, and that of the workforce needed to undertake them, made him the world's largest employer.

As a partner in Peto and Betts, he then became one of the major contractors in the building of the rapidly expanding railways of the time. Along with a small group of other Master Builders in London he is credited as a founding member of the Chartered Institute of Building in 1834.

== Early life ==
Samuel Morton Peto, normally called Morton Peto, was born on 4 August 1809, in Woking, Surrey. As a youth, he was apprenticed as a bricklayer to his uncle Henry Peto, who ran a building firm in London.

== Career ==
When his uncle died in 1830, Peto and his older cousin, Thomas Grissell (who had been a partner to his uncle for five years), went into partnership. The firm of Grissell and Peto (1830–1847) built many well-known buildings in London, including the Reform Club, the Oxford & Cambridge Club, the Lyceum, St James's Theatre and Hungerford Market at Charing Cross. In addition, they built Nelson's Column the new Houses of Parliament (1843) and the vast infrastructure project of the London brick sewer.

Another project, in 1848, was the Bloomsbury Baptist Chapel, the first Baptist church with spires in London. Tradition has it that the Crown Commissioner was reluctant to lease the land to nonconformists because of their "dull, spire-less architecture". Peto is said to have exclaimed, "A spire, my Lord? We shall have two!" The church had twin spires until 1951, when they were removed as unsafe.

== Railway works ==
In 1834 Peto saw the potential of the newly developing railways and dissolved the connection with his uncle's building firm. He and his cousin Thomas Grissell founded a business, Grissell and Peto, as an independent railway contractor. His firm's first railway work was to build two stations in Curzon Street, Birmingham. Next, the firm built its first line of track, the Hanwell and Langley section of the Great Western Railway, which included the Wharncliffe Viaduct.

Grissell became increasingly nervous about the risks taken by Peto, and in 1846 dissolved the partnership.

== Peto and Betts ==
In 1848 Peto and Edward Betts (who had married Peto's sister Ann) entered into a formal partnership and together they were to work on a large number of railway contracts. Frequently, they also worked in partnership with Thomas Brassey.

In 1854 during the Crimean War Peto, Betts and Brassey constructed the Grand Crimean Central Railway between Balaklava and Sevastopol to transport supplies to the troops at the front line.

In February 1855 the British government recognised Peto for his wartime services; he was made Baronet of Somerleyton Hall in the County of Suffolk. King Frederick VII of Denmark honoured Peto for establishing the Flensburg–Husum–Tönning Railway Company and its construction of railways in the Duchy of Schleswig, which led to a growing export/import trade with the port of Lowestoft. Another project abroad was the Homburg Railway built from 1859 to 1860.

The Peto and Betts partnership became insolvent in 1866 due to a combination of the failure of the bank, Overend, Gurney and Company, and their involvement in the failure of the London Chatham and Dover Railway.

== Other activities ==
In 1844, Peto bought Somerleyton Hall in Suffolk. He rebuilt the hall with contemporary amenities, as well as constructing a school and more houses in the village. He next built similar projects in Lowestoft.

In 1846, Peto became co-treasurer of the Baptist Missionary Society. From 1855 to March 1867, he was sole treasurer, resigning after personal financial difficulties. In 1855 he took over the lease of The Diorama, Regent's Park and paid for its conversion into a Baptist Chapel. He was a key contributor to the acquisition of Holford House, Regent's Park, for Regent's Park College, Oxford in 1854.

Peto served for two decades as a Member of Parliament. He was elected a Liberal Member for Norwich in 1847 to 1854, for Finsbury from 1859 to 1865, and for Bristol from 1865 to 1868. During this time he was one of the most prominent figures in public life. He helped to make a guarantee towards the financing of The Great Exhibition of 1851, backing Joseph Paxton's Crystal Palace.

In 1855 Peto was made a baronet; but in the 1860s his businesses ran into trouble, so that in 1863 he sold Somerleyton Hall and in 1866 became bankrupt.

After his involvement with the insolvency of the London, Chatham and Dover Railway in 1866, and the failure of the Peto and Betts partnership, Peto's personal reputation as a trustworthy businessman was badly damaged and never fully recovered.

Between 1863-65 the current Embassy of Nepal in Kensington Place Gardens, London W8, designed by the architect James Murray, was built for Peto.

In 1865 he is listed as living at Auchline House at Killin in Perthshire.

In 1868, he had to give up his seat in Parliament, despite having the support of both Benjamin Disraeli and William Ewart Gladstone. He exiled himself to Budapest and tried to promote railways in Russia and Hungary.

When he returned he became the main contractor for the Cornwall Minerals Railway which opened in 1874, but the failure of the related Cornish Consolidated Iron Mines Corporation meant that he sustained heavy losses when iron ore traffic on the CMR failed to live up to expectations. The CMR itself survived and began to recover after it had introduced passenger services in 1876 and was then leased by the Great Western Railway in 1877, but this improvement came too late for Peto.

He died in obscurity in 1889. (Note: He is buried with his second wife at Pembury old church, near Tonbridge, Kent.)

== Legacy ==
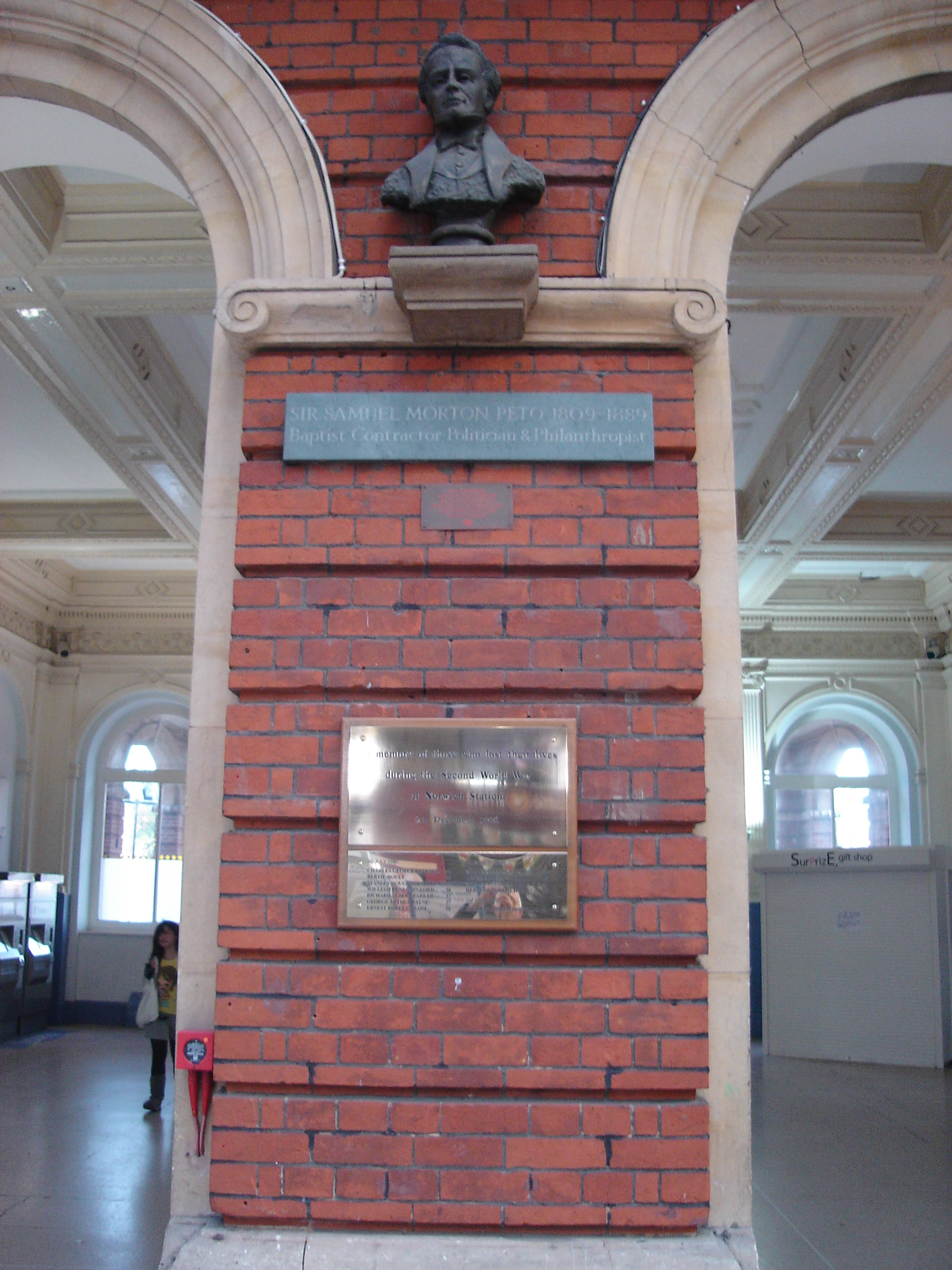
The bust of Peto in Norwich Station (2010)

An extremely unfavourable portrait of Peto is included in the appendix to George Borrow's Romany Rye, where he is described as "Mr. Flamson". When Peto promoted the Lowestoft Railway and Harbour Company in the 1840s, the railway split Borrow's estate at Oulton Broad, just outside Lowestoft. Borrow deeply resented this and bore a grudge against Peto thereafter.

Peto is commemorated by a portrait bust at Norwich railway station by John Pooler. Morton Peto Road, a road in Great Yarmouth, was named after him. There is a road in Lowestoft called "Peto Way" that connects Lowestoft railway station (via Denmark Road, again in connection with Peto's legacy in Denmark) to Normanston.

In Ashford, Kent, Samuel Peto Way is a residential road built upon the old Newtown Railway Works site and was named in his honour.

In Bishop's Stortford, Hertfordshire, Morton Peto Road is located close to the town's railway station.

A portrait of Peto hangs outside the library at Regent's Park College, Oxford, in commemoration of his assistance with the college's move from Stepney to Regent's Park.

== Family ==
In May 1831 Peto married Mary Grissell, one of the sisters of his later partner, Thomas Grissell. They had four children before Mary's death in 1842:

1. Henry (1840–1938) who succeeded as the 2nd baronet in 1899
2. Annie
3. Sophia
4. Mary, who married Penruddocke Wyndham, a grandson of Colonel Wadham Wyndham, in 1852 and had two daughters.

Peto then married Sarah Ainsworth Kelsall, the daughter of Henry Kelsall of Rochdale. Peto and Sarah had many children. Of these:

1. Morton Kelsall (b. 1845)
2. William Herbert (b. 1849.) He was the father of Gladys Peto and Ralph Peto, maternal grandfather of John Edward Hollister Montagu, 11th Earl of Sandwich.
3. Samuel Arthur (b. 1852)
4. Harold Ainsworth (1854–1933), the celebrated landscape architect.
5. Frank Kelsall (b. 1858)
6. Basil Edward Peto (1862–1945), created a baronet in his own right in 1927. His grandson Christopher Peto, 3rd Bt. was a Conservative politician.
7. Sarah
8. Maude
9. Edith
10. Emily
11. Helen Agnes, who married Lawrence Ingham Baker, son of the former Liberal MP for Frome; he was a magistrate of Somerset. They lived at Wayford Manor House at Wayford, near Crewkerne, Somerset.

== Notes ==
Parliament of the United Kingdom
Preceded by Marquess of Douro; Benjamin Smith	Member of Parliament for Norwich; 1847–1854; With: Marquess of Douro 1847–1852; Edward Warner 1852–1854	Succeeded by Edward Warner; Sir Samuel Bignold
Preceded by Thomas Slingsby Duncombe; William Cox	Member of Parliament for Finsbury; 1859–1865; With: Thomas Slingsby Duncombe 1859–1861; William Cox 1861–1865	Succeeded by William McCullagh Torrens; Sir Andrew Lusk
Preceded by Henry Fitzhardinge Berkeley; Henry Gore-Langton	Member of Parliament for Bristol; 1865–1868; With: Henry Fitzhardinge Berkeley	Succeeded by Henry Fitzhardinge Berkeley; John Miles
Baronetage of the United Kingdom
New creation	Baronet (of Somerleyton Hall); 1855–1889	Succeeded by Henry Peto
