= Henry Grissell =

- Born: 4 July 1817; London, England
- Died: 31 January 1883 (aged 65)
- Occupations: Public works Foundry contractor
- Parent: Thomas de la Garde Grissell

Henry Grissell (4 July 1817 – 31 January 1883), sometimes known as "Iron Henry", was an English foundry-man who was responsible for the ironwork in a number of prestigious buildings in England, Russia, Austria, and Egypt.

== Early life and education ==
Henry Grissell was born in London to Thomas de la Garde Grissell, who worked with the East India Company. He started work with John Joseph Bramah, of the Bramah company, known for his intricate castings and metal work.

== Career ==
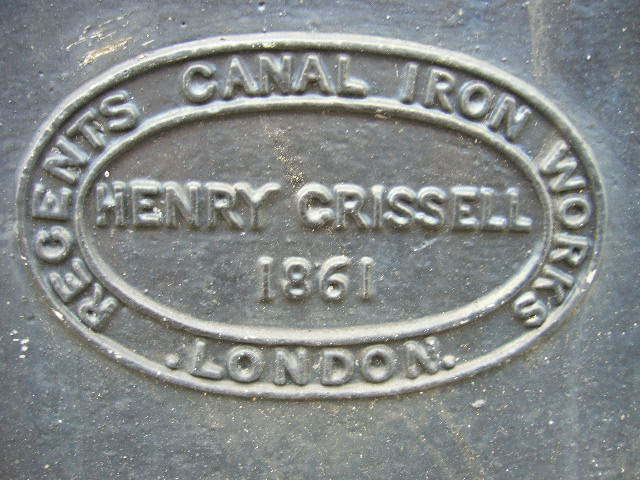
Grissell's maker's mark on a coal tax post, 1861

Grissell started his own business in partnership with his brother, Martin De La Garde Grissell, at the Regent's Canal Ironworks, Eagle Wharf Road, as ironfounders and contractors in about 1841. Martin left the partnership in 1858. They worked with the major engineers of the time, including Robert Stephenson, Bidder, Walker & Burges, and Sir William Cubitt.

The company made the ironwork for some major bridges, including at the river Nene, Sutton, Lincolnshire, Great Yarmouth, and the Nile in Egypt, as well as works in Portsmouth and Devonport dockyards. Overseas jobs included waterworks at Vienna, Leipzig, Russia, and various lighthouses. They also made ironwork for Covent Garden Opera House, for some of the Houses of Parliament and the new museum at South Kensington. He also made the gates for Sir William Tite's Royal Exchange, the gates and railings round Buckingham Palace and at the British Museum. He cast all the Type 2 Coal Tax posts – about 200 of them.

Another brother, Thomas Grissell, was a major public works contractor, with cousin Henry Peto.

After the banking crisis of 1866, Henry closed the foundry and developed his interests in Scandinavian timber. He died in 1883 at his home in Montagu Square and was interred at West Norwood Cemetery in an elaborate Gothic tomb made of iron, constructed initially for his father.

== Sources ==
- Institute of Civil Engineers. Minutes of the Proceedings, Volume 73, Issue 1883
