= Thomas Grissell =

British civil engineer (1801–1874)

- Born: 4 October 1801; Stockwell, Surrey, England
- Died: 26 May 1874 (aged 72); Norbury Park, Mickleham, Surrey, England
- Education: St. Paul's School, London
- Occupation: Public works contractor

Thomas Grissell (4 October 1801 – 26 May 1874) was an English public works contractor who was responsible for constructing a number of buildings in England.

== Early life and education ==
Thomas Grissell was born in Stockwell, South London, the eldest son of Thomas de la Garde Grissell, who worked with the East India Company. He was educated at St. Paul's School, London and intended to train in medicine. In 1815 his family articled him to Henry Peto, his uncle, a leading public works contractor.

== Career ==
Grissell took to the business and became Peto's partner in 1825. After Henry Peto died in 1830, Grissell took as partner his cousin Samuel Morton Peto, who had married his sister Mary. The new partnership was called Grissell and Peto.

Together Grissell and Peto built up a rapidly growing business, controlling all their operations from stone-quarrying to the manufacture of fittings for their buildings. Grissell claimed to have made innovations in building technique, including a form of braced and bolted timber scaffolding. They were awarded the contract for Birmingham Grammar School (with Charles Barry as architect). They next constructed a number of prestigious buildings in London, including Hungerford Market in the Strand; Nelson's Column; the Reform Club, Conservative Club, Oxford and Cambridge Club, Clerkenwell Prison, the Lyceum Theatre and St. James' Theatre.

The firm became engaged in railway building, including parts of the Great Western Railway and the South Eastern Railway. Not liking the risks involved in these massive public works projects, Grissell dissolved the partnership in 1846. Grissell had numerous contracts for work building the Houses of Parliament, again with Charles Barry as architect. But, due to a dispute about the pricing of some of the refined craftwork, Grissell was not able to fully complete the building.

== Private life ==
One of his sons was Hartwell de la Garde Grissell, the Catholic tractarian. Two of his brothers, Henry and Martin, founded the Regent's Canal Iron Foundry and constructed major ironworks.

As a result of the profits from his business, Thomas Grissell was able to live well. From about 1847 he lived at 19 Kensington Gardens, London in one of a pair of houses designed in Barry's offices and built by Grissell's firm. He used surplus stone selected for the project of the Houses of Parliament. There his family had a staff of 9 servants.

In 1850 he bought Norbury Park in Mickleham, Surrey. There he was appointed a magistrate, and in 1853, high sheriff of the county. While at Norbury Park, he collected Italian and English paintings and sculptures.

Thomas died there in 1874 and was buried in the churchyard at St. Michael's Church in Mickleham. He left an estate of under £200,000.

== See also ==
- Wharncliffe Viaduct – designed by Brunel, built by Grissell & Peto

Honorary titles
Preceded by George Robert Smith	High Sheriff of Surrey; 1853	Succeeded by Robert Gosling
