= Peto, Brassey and Betts =

British civil engineering partnership

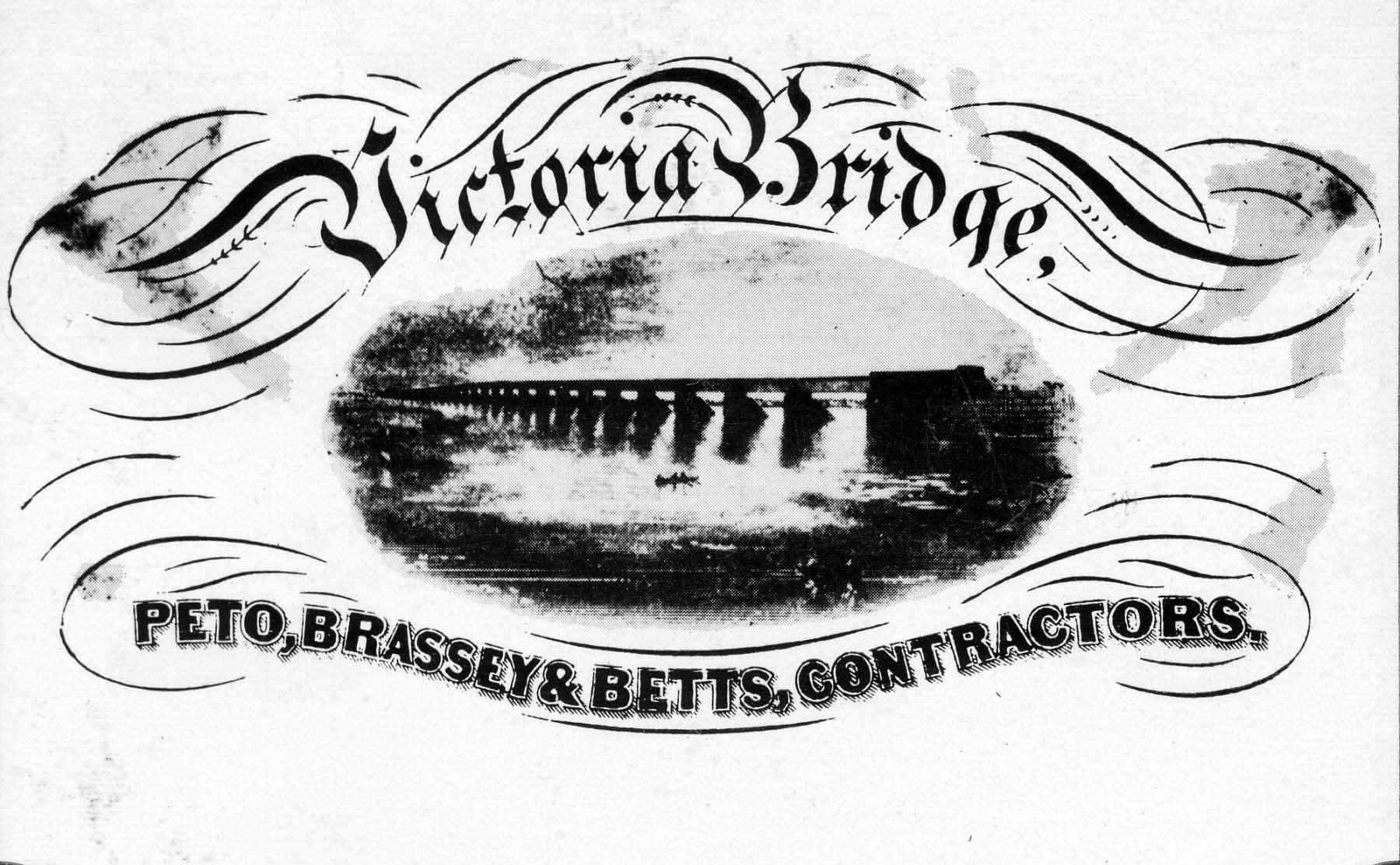
Handbill showing Victoria Bridge and the names of the partners

Peto, Brassey and Betts was a civil engineering partnership between Samuel Morton Peto, Thomas Brassey and Edward Betts. They built a supply and casualty transport railway (Grand Crimean Central Railway) from Balaclava port to the siege lines southeast of Sevastopol in 1855 during the Crimean War. The supply line was instrumental in the success of the siege. The partnership was contracted to produce a number of significant projects around the world including Victoria Bridge in Montreal and the European and North American Railway.

== Significant works ==
- 1854: London, Tilbury and Southend Railway
- 1855: Grand Crimean Central Railway for the British Army
- 1859: Victoria Bridge, Montreal, Canada
- 1865–1867: Main Range Railway in Queensland, Australia

== Gallery ==
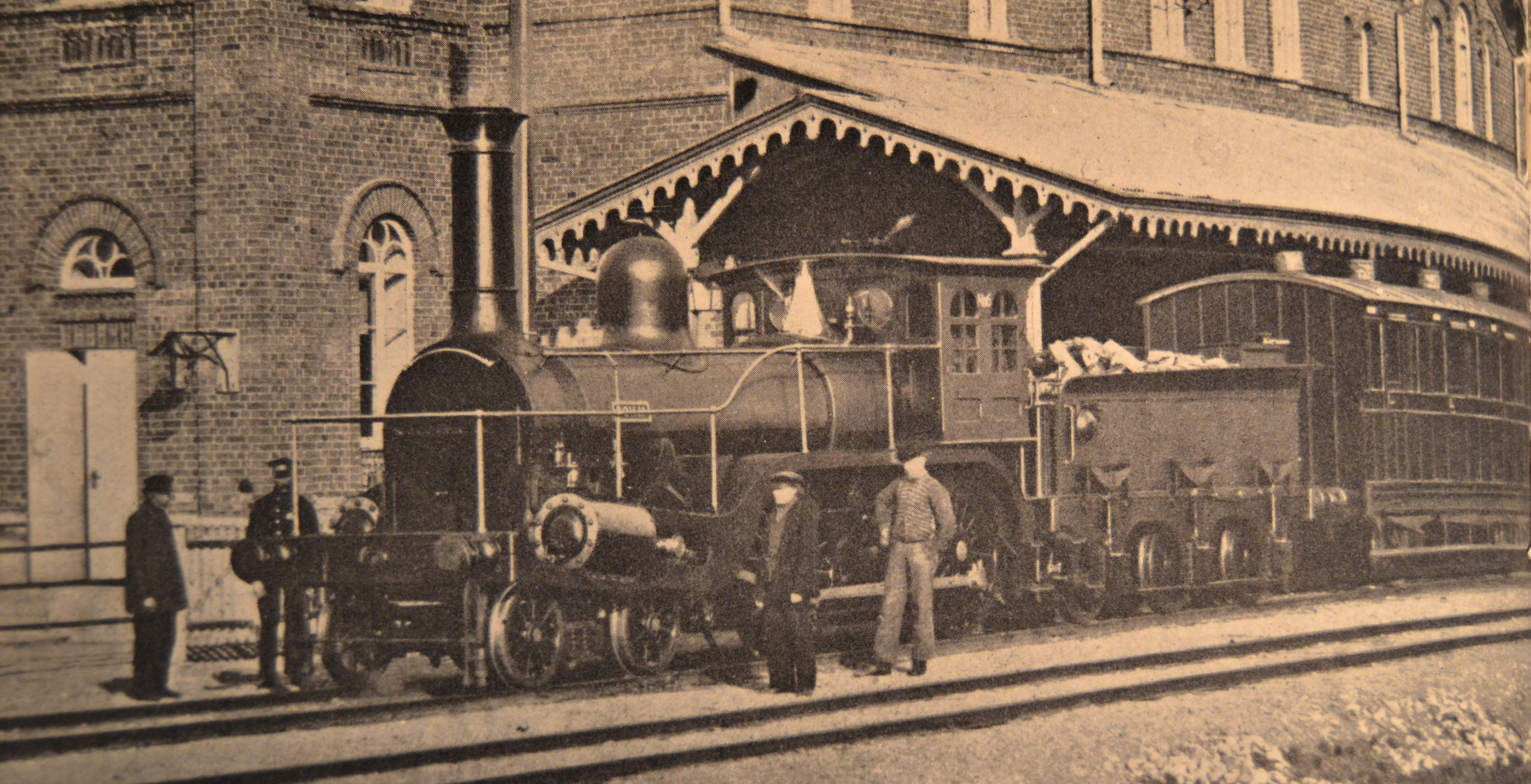
Finnish A1 locomotive built at the Canada Works in Birkenhead of Peto, Brassey and Betts (ordered 1859)
