= Henry Peto =

Henry Peto (1780–1830) was a British building contractor and uncle to Thomas Grissell (1801–1874) and Morton Peto.

== Partnerships and apprenticeships ==
Henry Peto was in partnership with another building contractor, John Miles, as Miles and Peto. Thomas Grissell was an apprentice in their business and after Miles' death in 1825, Grissell was invited into the partnership. Morton Peto had also been an apprentice but his apprenticeship ended shortly before his uncle's death.

== Private life ==
Henry Peto was considered strict with his nephews.

Others besides the nephew were objects of Henry Peto's kindness. One day Henry Peto asked William Woods (an old waiter at his favourite lunch-time dining room, the Rainbow Chophouse in Fleet Street) whether he would like to keep a hotel. Woods replied there was nothing he would like better, but that he could not afford it. Henry Peto installed Woods at a hotel in Furnival's Inn which he had just built and which he owned. Woods Hotel was so successful that William Woods retired allegedly with a pension savings of £180,000. This expected exaggerated. (equivalent to £21,250,000 in 2023).

== Custom House scandal ==
Miles and Peto had tendered to rebuild the Custom House in the City of London. The original estimate had been for £209,000 but Miles and Peto won the contract by giving the lowest tender at £165,000.

John Miles died in the early stages of construction, leaving Peto to deal with the difficulties. To cut costs Peto dramatically reduced the specification of the work he undertook with the outcome that part of the building collapsed. The ensuing investigation found the true extent of the poor workmanship, prompting questions in Parliament in 1825. The Chancellor of the Exchequer declared the most scandalous frauds had been practiced. Peto was censured for neglect and poor workmanship that a good builder would carefully have avoided.

== Later life ==
The stress of the Custom House contract led to the death of Henry Peto on 15 September 1830.

Although he left a considerable estate, with income of about £12,000 per annum, there were mortgages of between £7,000 and £8,000 per annum and some annuities (i.e. pensions) of about £3,000 per annum, leaving only a small balance. There was also a continuing lawsuit regarding the Custom House. In his will he left his building business to his two nephews, Thomas Grissell and Morton Peto.

The will was contested by Henry's widow on the grounds of undue influence by the two nephews as they and the solicitor were the only people present when Henry signed the will just a few days before his death. Henry's widow eventually lost in the courts and the two nephews, now in partnership as Grissell and Peto were free to begin building up the business.
