= Nelson's Column =

Monument in Trafalgar Square, London

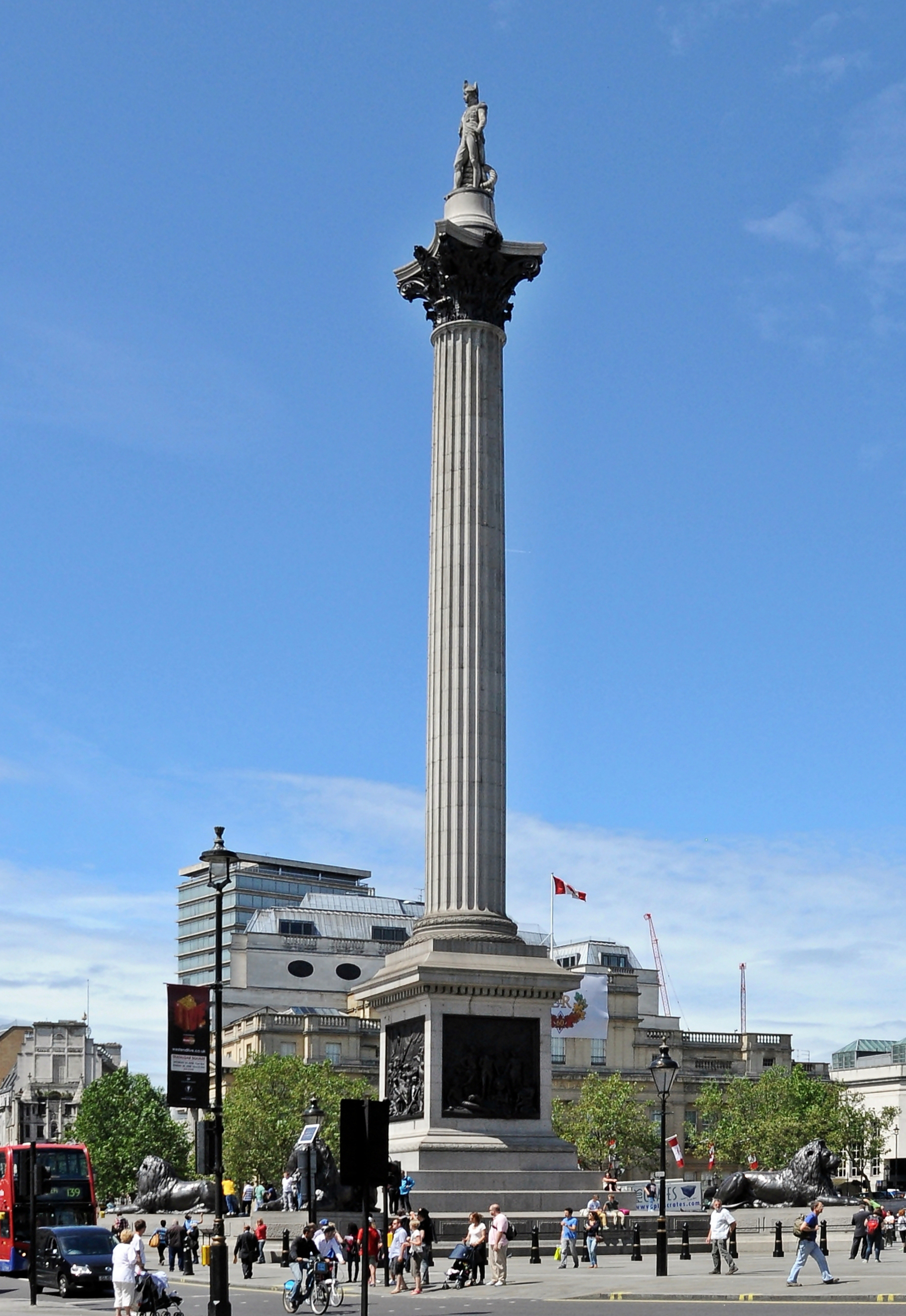
- Nelson's Column, Trafalgar Square
- Interactive map of Nelson's Column
- Location: London, England WC2; United Kingdom
- Coordinates: 51°30′27.8″N 0°07′40.7″W
- Designer: William Railton, Edward Hodges Baily and Sir Edwin Landseer; Also: Musgrave Watson, William F. Woodington, John Ternouth and John Edward Carew (sculptors), Grissell and Peto (contractors)
- Type: Victory column
- Material: Granite and bronze
- Height: 169 feet 3 inches (51.59 m)
- Beginning date: 1840
- Completion date: 1843
- Opening date: 1843
- Dedicated to: Admiral Horatio Nelson

Nelson's Column is a monument in Trafalgar Square in the City of Westminster, Central London, England, United Kingdom, built to commemorate British Royal Navy officer Horatio Nelson's decisive victory at the Battle of Trafalgar over the combined French and Spanish navies, during which he was killed by a French sniper. The monument was constructed between 1840 and 1843 to a design by William Railton at a cost of £47,000 (equivalent to £5,163,046 in 2025). It is a column of the Corinthian order built from Dartmoor granite. The statue of Nelson at the top was carved from Craigleith sandstone by sculptor Edward Hodges Baily. The four bronze lions around its base, designed by Sir Edwin Landseer, were added in 1867.

The pedestal is decorated with four bronze relief panels, each 18 feet (5.5 m) square, cast from captured French guns. They depict the Battle of Cape St. Vincent, the Battle of the Nile, the Battle of Copenhagen and the death of Nelson at Trafalgar. The sculptors were Musgrave Watson, William F. Woodington, John Ternouth and John Edward Carew, respectively. The ornate capital upon which Nelson stands is by Charles Harriott Smith.

It was refurbished in 2006 at a cost of £420,000 (equivalent to £725,835 in 2025), at which time it was surveyed and found to be 14 feet 6 inches (4.42 m) shorter than previously supposed. The whole monument is 169 feet 3 inches (51.59 m) tall from the bottom of the pedestal to the top of Nelson's hat. The statue of Nelson is 17 feet (5.2 m). Nelson was 5 feet 6 inches; a ratio of almost exactly 3:1.

== Construction and history ==
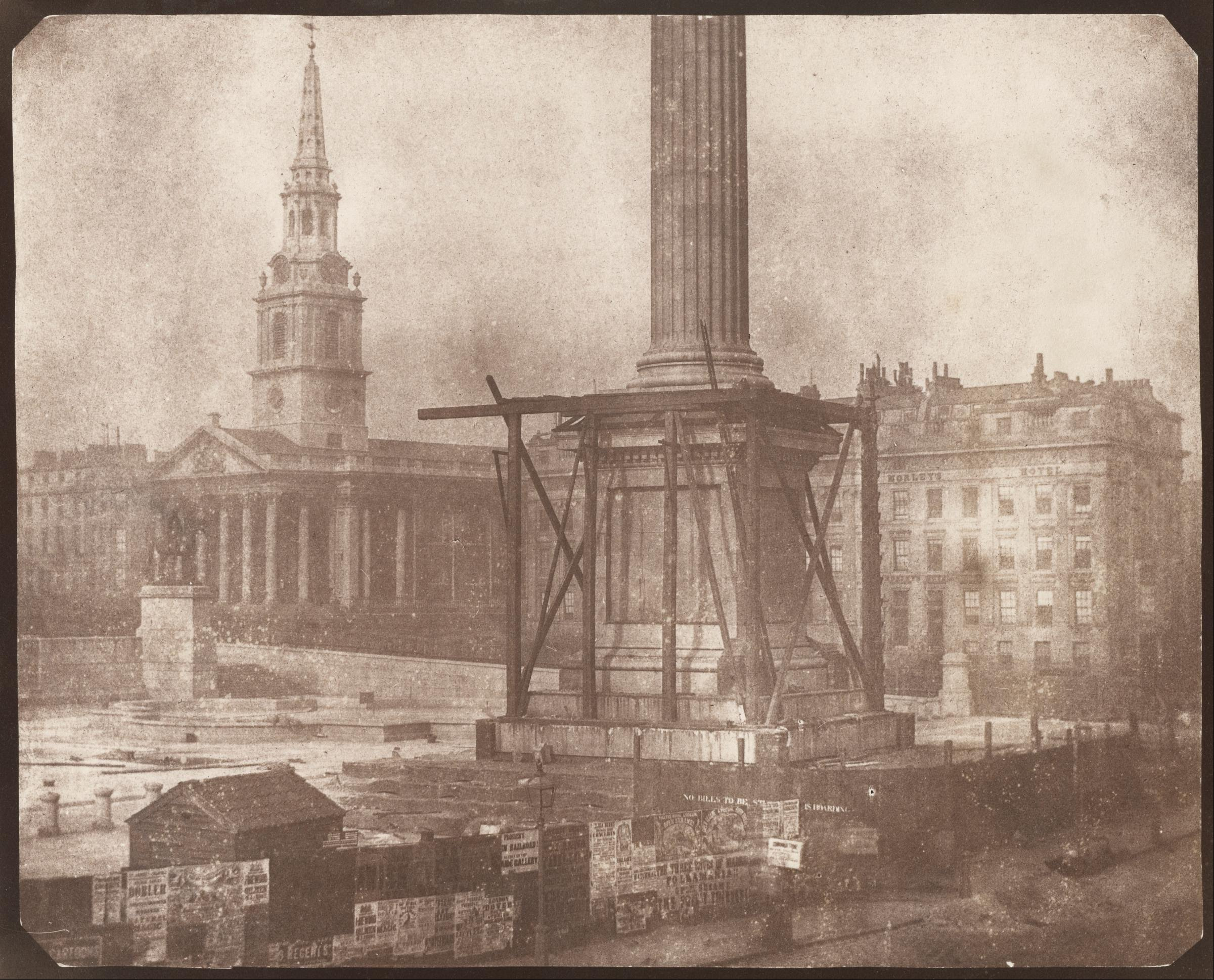
The column under construction, 1843. William Henry Fox Talbot

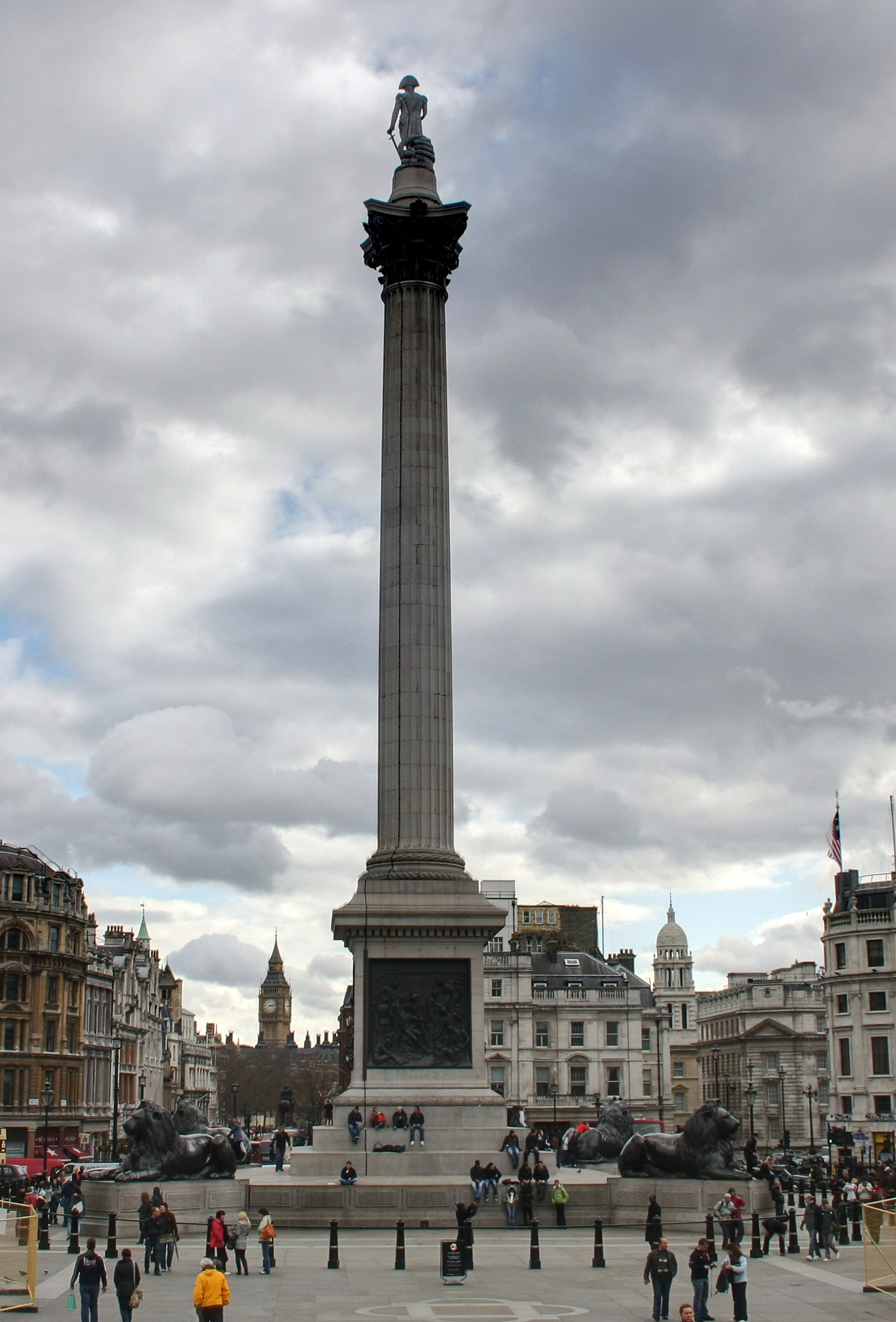
The column looking south towards Whitehall, The Palace of Westminster and Westminster Abbey

In February 1838, a group of 121 peers, Members of Parliament (MPs) and other gentry formed a committee to raise a monument to Lord Nelson, funded by public subscription, and the government agreed to provide a site in Trafalgar Square, in front of the newly completed National Gallery. A competition was held for designs with an estimated budget of between £20,000 and £30,000. The deadline for submissions was 31 January 1839.

The winning entry, chosen by the sub-committee headed by the Duke of Wellington was a design by William Railton for a Corinthian column, surmounted by a statue of Nelson, and flanked by four sculpted lions. Flights of steps would lead up between the lions to the pedestal of the column. Several other entrants also submitted schemes for columns. The second prize was won by Edward Hodges Baily who suggested an obelisk surrounded by sculptures.

Criticism of the organisation of the competition caused it to be re-run. Railton submitted a slightly revised design, and was once again declared the winner, with the stipulation that the statue of Nelson should be made by Baily. The original plan was for a column 203 feet (62 m) high, including the base and statue, but this was reduced to 170 feet (52 m) with a shaft of 98 feet (30 m) due to concerns over stability. The base was to have been of granite and the shaft of Craigleith sandstone, but before construction began it was decided that the shaft should also be of granite.

Excavations for the brick foundations had begun by July 1840. On 30 September 1840, the first stone of the column was laid by Charles Davison Scott, honorary secretary of the committee (and son of Nelson's secretary, John Scott), at a ceremony conducted, according to the Nautical Magazine, "in a private manner, owing to the noblemen and gentlemen comprising the committee being absent from town". Construction of the monument, by the contractors Grissell and Peto, progressed slowly, and the stonework, ready for the installation of the statue, was not completed until November 1843.

In 1844, the Nelson Memorial Committee ran out of money, having only raised £20,485 in public subscriptions, and the government, in the form of the Office of Woods and Forests took over the project.

Installation of the bronze reliefs on the pedestal did not begin until late 1849, when John Edward Carew's depiction of the death of Nelson was put in place on the side facing Whitehall. This was followed early the next year by William F. Woodington's relief of the Battle of the Nile on the opposite side. Carew's relief was cast by Adams, Christie and Co. of Rotherhithe. The other three were cast by Moore, Fressange and Moore. The last to be made, The Battle of Cape St. Vincent became the subject of legal action, when it was discovered that the bronze had been adulterated with iron. The partners in the company were jailed for fraud and the relief was completed by Robinson and Cottam. It was finally put in place in May 1854.

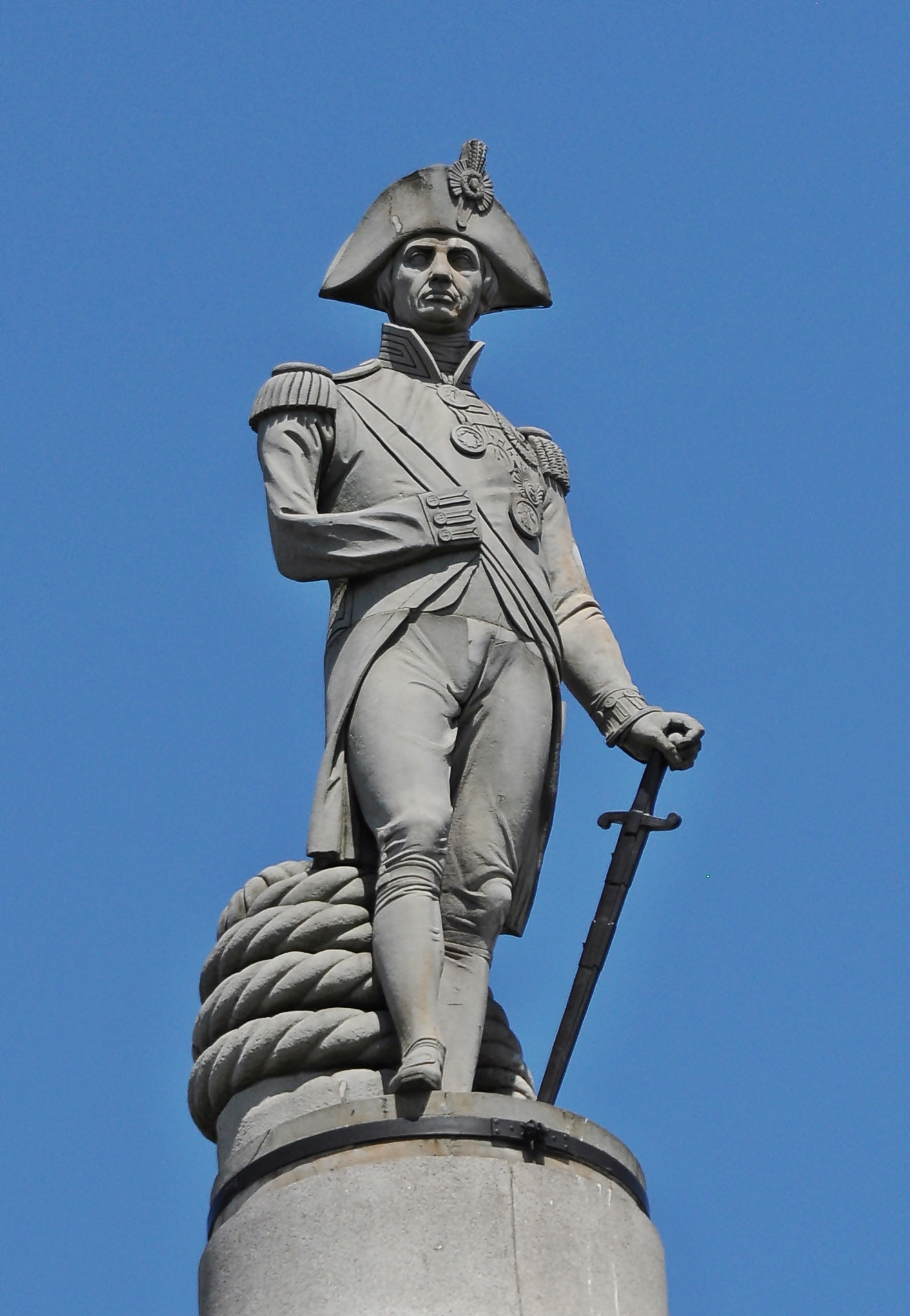
The sandstone statue by Edward Hodges Baily

The 17 feet (5.2 m) statue at the top was sculpted by Edward Hodges Baily R.A. from three pieces of Craigleith type sandstone donated by Walter Montagu Douglas Scott, 5th Duke of Buccleuch, former chairman of the Nelson Memorial Committee, from his own quarry at Granton, Edinburgh.

The statue stands on a fluted column built from solid blocks of granite from the Foggintor quarries on Dartmoor. The Corinthian capital is made of bronze elements, cast from cannon salvaged from the wreck of HMS Royal George at the Woolwich Arsenal foundry. It is based on the Temple of Mars Ultor in Rome, and was modelled by C. H. Smith. The bronze pieces, some weighing as much as 900 pounds (410 kg) are fixed to the column by the means of three large belts of metal lying in grooves in the stone.

The column also had a symbolic importance to German Nazi leader, Adolf Hitler. If Hitler's plan to invade Great Britain, Operation Sea Lion, had been successful, he planned to move it to Berlin, the capital of Germany.

== Lions ==
The four identical bronze Barbary lions at the column's base were not added until 1867. At one stage they were intended to be of granite, and the sculptor John Graham Lough was chosen to carve them. However, in 1846, after consultations with Railton, he turned down the commission, unwilling to work under the restrictions imposed by the architect.

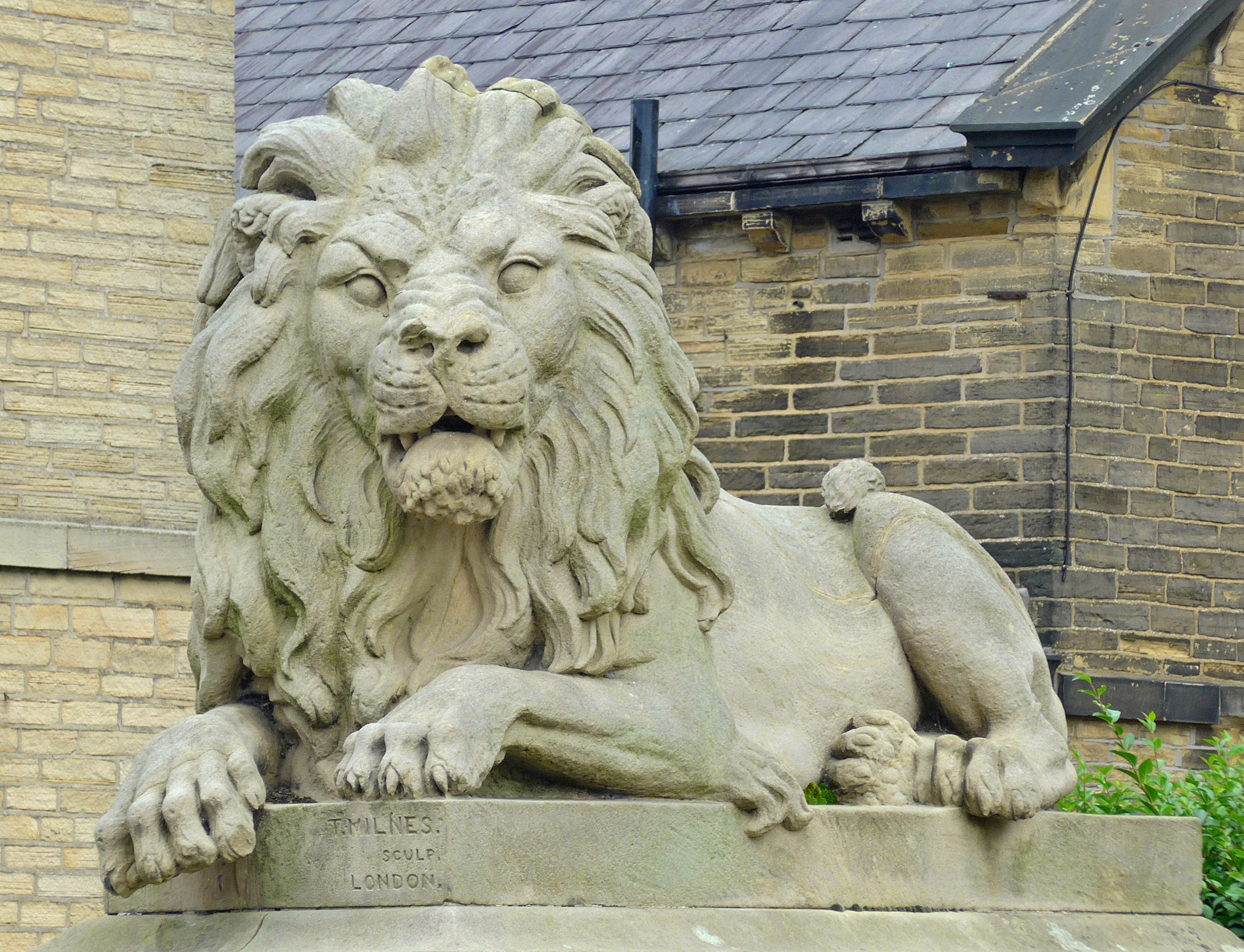
Milne's model for "War", in place at Saltaire Village

Thomas Milnes received the commission in 1858, and produced four full-scale models in sandstone, each individualised to represent Peace, War, Vigilance and Determination. These were rejected, and the commission was transferred, again, to Sir Edwin Landseer. Subsequently mill owner Sir Titus Salt bought the statues instead for a civic building at the centre of his workers village, installed on pedestals in 1869. The four sandstone Lions now have Grade II* listed building status.

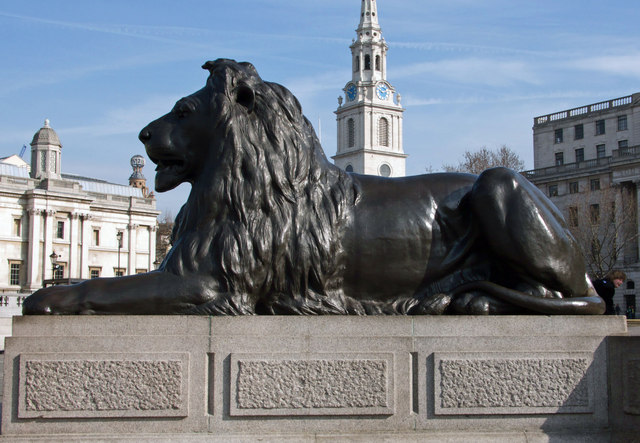
One of the four lions designed by Edwin Landseer at the base

The sculptures eventually installed were designed by Sir Edwin Landseer in collaboration with Carlo Marochetti. Landseer was a hugely popular painter and the favourite of Queen Victoria. Their design may have been influenced by Marschalko János's lions at each abutment to the Széchenyi Chain Bridge in Budapest, installed six years before the Trafalgar Square lions were commissioned.

Landseer requested casts of a real lion from Turin which did not arrive until 1860. In the meantime, he made sketches of lions at London Zoo and eventually received the corpse of one to work with. Delays in completing the work meant that the corpse started to decompose, leading to some discrepancies in form. The paws, for example, were based on those of a cat, and the sculpted lion's backs are concave rather than convex.

The sculptures were eventually installed in 1867. Landseer was paid £6,000 for his services, and Marochetti £11,000.

In 2011, consultants for the Greater London Authority reported that tourists climbing onto the backs of the lions have caused considerable damage and recommended banning tourists from climbing them.

== Refurbishment ==
The column was renovated and cleaned by sandblasting in 1968.

The column was refurbished in 2006, during which time it was scaffolded from top to bottom for access. Steam cleaning was used, together with gentle abrasives, in order to minimise any harmful impact on the bronze and stonework. The £420,000 cost was covered by Zurich Financial Services, which advertised on the scaffolding for the duration of the work. Before restoration began, laser surveys were taken during which it was found that the column was significantly shorter than the usually quoted 185 ft (56.4 m). In fact, it measures 169 ft (51.5 m) from the bottom of the first step to the tip of the admiral's hat.

== Publicity stunts and protests ==
John Noakes of the BBC TV children's programme Blue Peter climbed the column in 1977. Television presenter and entertainer Gary Wilmot climbed the column in 1989 for LWT's Six O' Clock Show to recreate the 'topping out' ceremony of 1843. Dressed in Victorian attire and sporting a boater hat, Wilmot enjoyed tea and sandwiches at the top of the column before climbing down.

The column has also been climbed on several occasions as a publicity stunt to draw attention to social or political causes. Ed Drummond made the first such climb in 1978 for the Anti-Apartheid Movement, making use of the lightning conductor en route. On 30 March 1988, two Greenpeace activists climbed the column as part of a campaign against Acid rain. On 14 June 1992, three Greenpeace activists climbed the column to protest against the first Earth Summit meeting in Brazil. On 13 April 1995, Simon Nadin free-climbed Nelson's Column with Noel Craine, Jerry Moffatt and Johnny Dawes following on top rope, and graded the climb as "E6 6b/5a". The protest this time was on behalf of Survival International to publicise the plight of Canadian Inuit. On 13 May 1998, the column was climbed by three activists on behalf of Greenpeace to protest against Old growth logging activity in British Columbia. In May 2003, BASE jumper and stuntman Gary Connery parachuted from the top of the column, in an action designed to draw attention to the Chinese policies in Tibet.

In December 2015, Disney paid £24,000 to cover it in lights to make it resemble a giant lightsaber, to promote Star Wars: The Force Awakens.

On 18 April 2016, in the early hours of the morning, Greenpeace activists climbed up the column and placed a breathing mask on Admiral Lord Nelson in protest of air pollution levels.

== Other monuments to Nelson ==
The first civic monument to be erected in Nelson's honour was the Nelson Monument, a 44-metre high obelisk on Glasgow Green in Glasgow, Scotland, in 1806. Also in Scotland, the foundation stone for Nelson's Tower at Forres in Moray was laid in 1806 and it was completed in 1812; while the Nelson Monument stands on top of Calton Hill, Edinburgh. In Dublin, Ireland, Nelson's Pillar was erected in 1808 but was destroyed by republicans in 1966, and in the Bull Ring, Birmingham, England, there is a Grade II* listed bronze statue of Nelson by Richard Westmacott, dating from 1809. Westmacott also designed the elaborate monument to Nelson in Liverpool. In Portsmouth, Nelson's Needle, on top of Portsdown Hill, was paid for by the company of HMS Victory after arriving back in Portsmouth. There is a column topped with a decorative urn in the Castle Green, Hereford – a statue was planned in place of the urn, but insufficient money was raised. The Britannia Monument in Great Yarmouth, England (1819), is a 144-foot-high doric column design.

Elsewhere in the world, Nelson's Column in Montreal was erected by both Britons and Canadians in 1809, and there is also a Mount Nelson, near Invermere, British Columbia. As at London, the column in Montreal has the admiral standing with his back to the waves. A much shorter statue of Lord Nelson that stood in Trafalgar Square, Bridgetown, Barbados, is older than its counterpart in London. It has since been moved to the Barbados Museum due to an ongoing controversy surrounding Nelson's opinions on colonial matters.

== Gallery ==
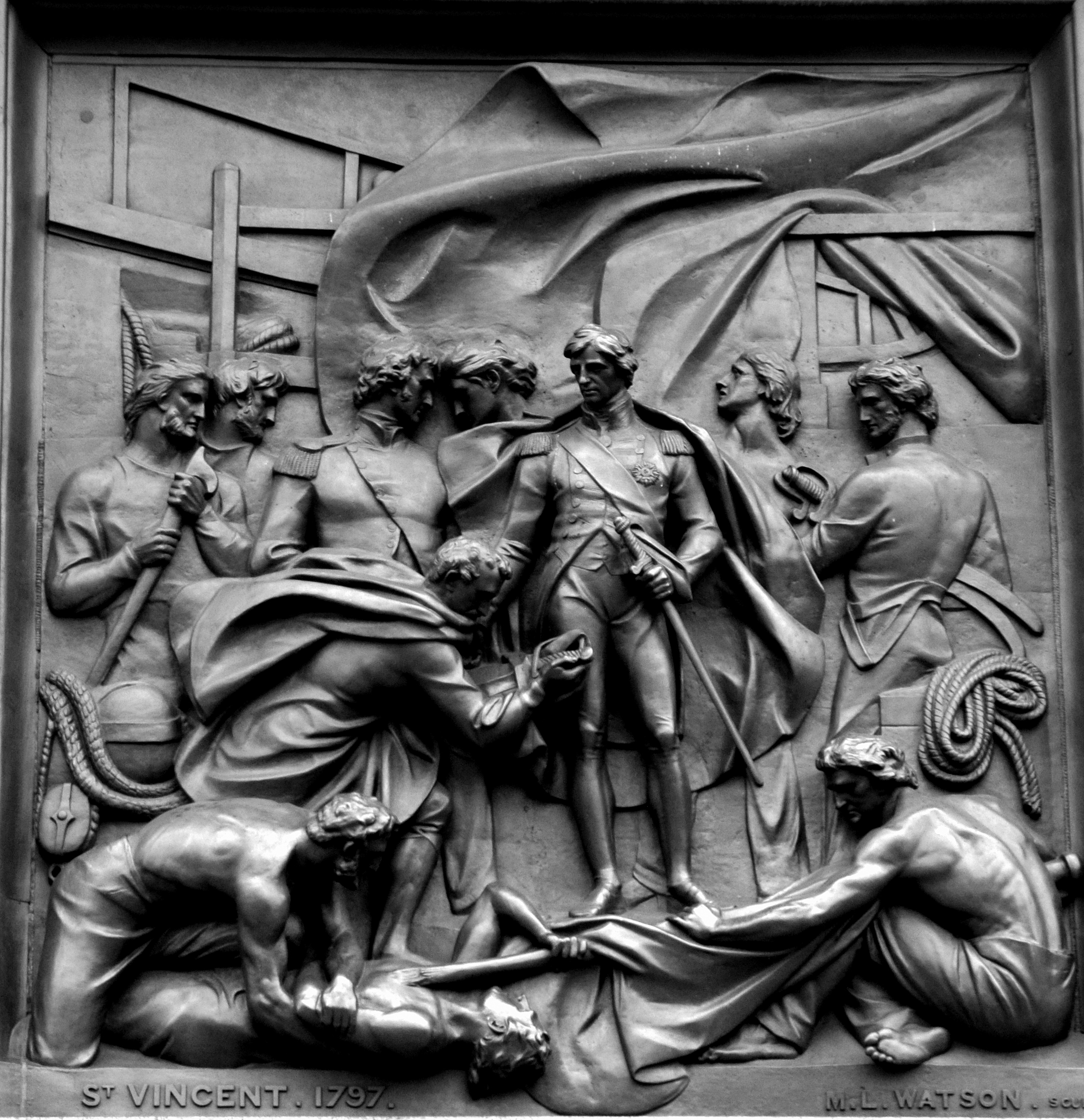
The Battle of Cape St. Vincent by Musgrave Watson and William F. Woodington, the relief on the west face of the plinth

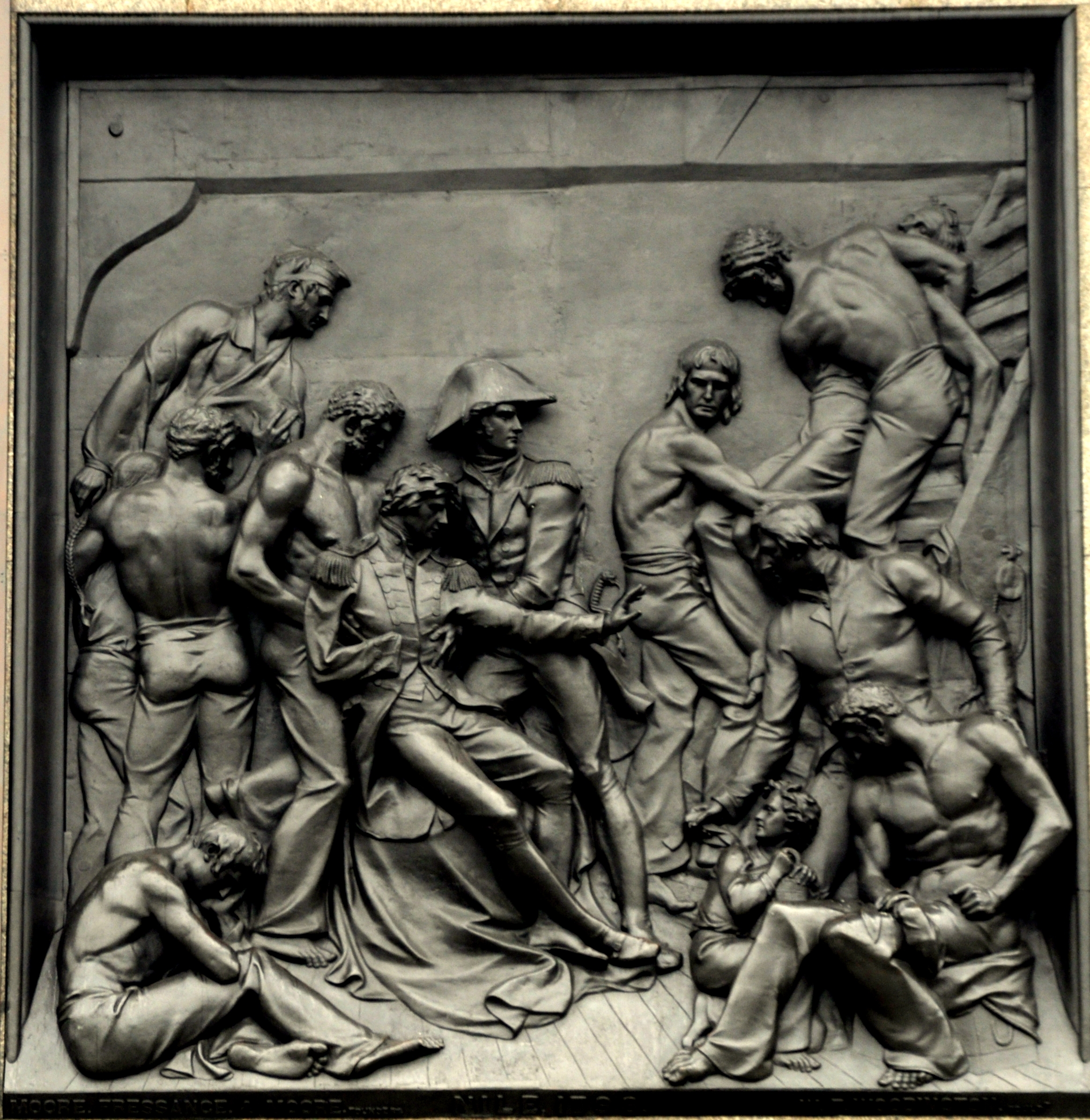
The Battle of the Nile by William F. Woodington, the relief on the north face of the plinth

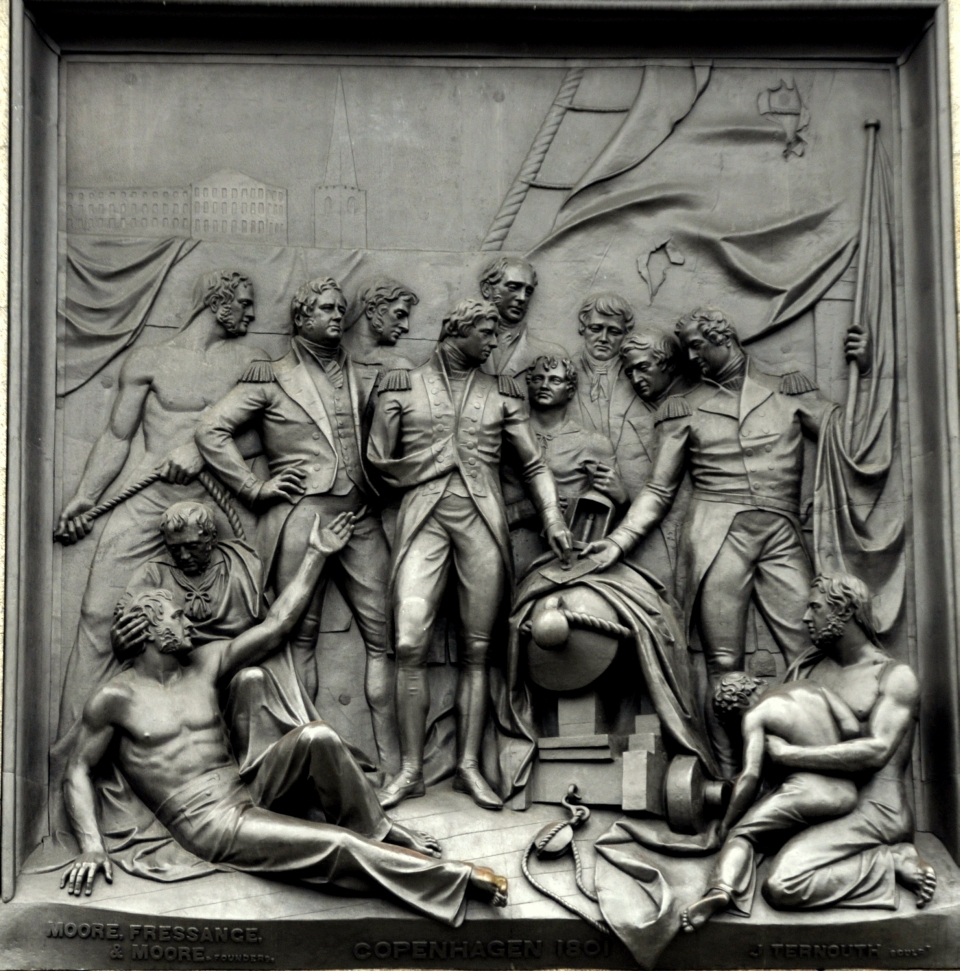
The Battle of Copenhagen by John Ternouth, the relief on the east face of the plinth

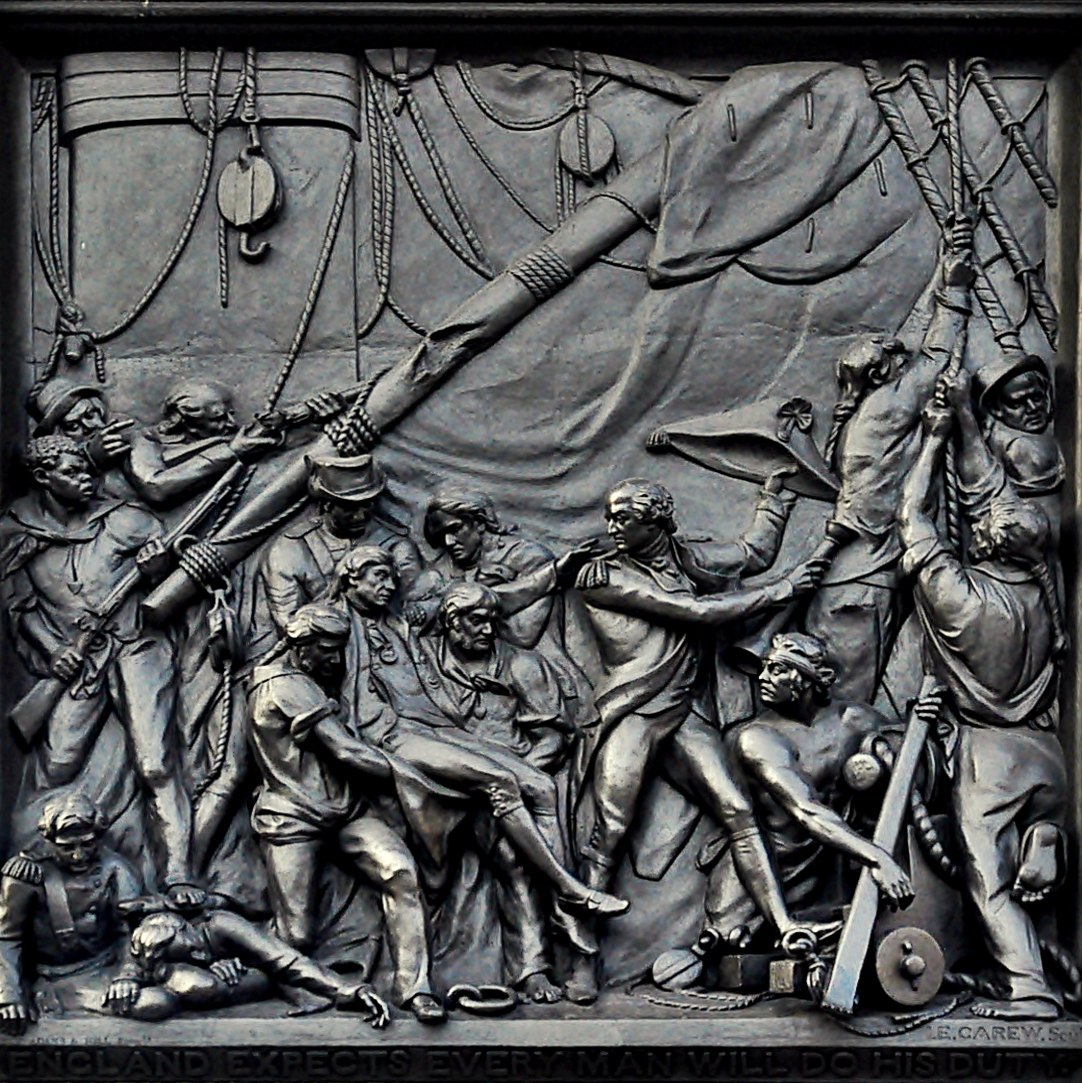
The Death of Nelson at Trafalgar by John Edward Carew, the relief on the south face of the plinth

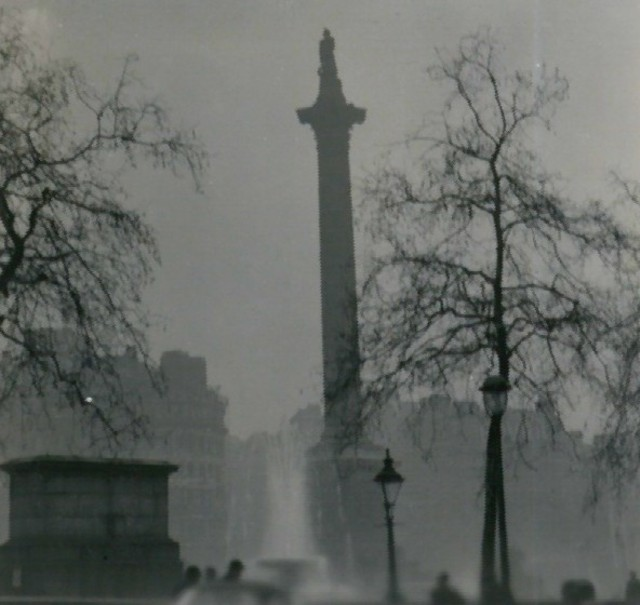
The column during the Great Smog of 1952

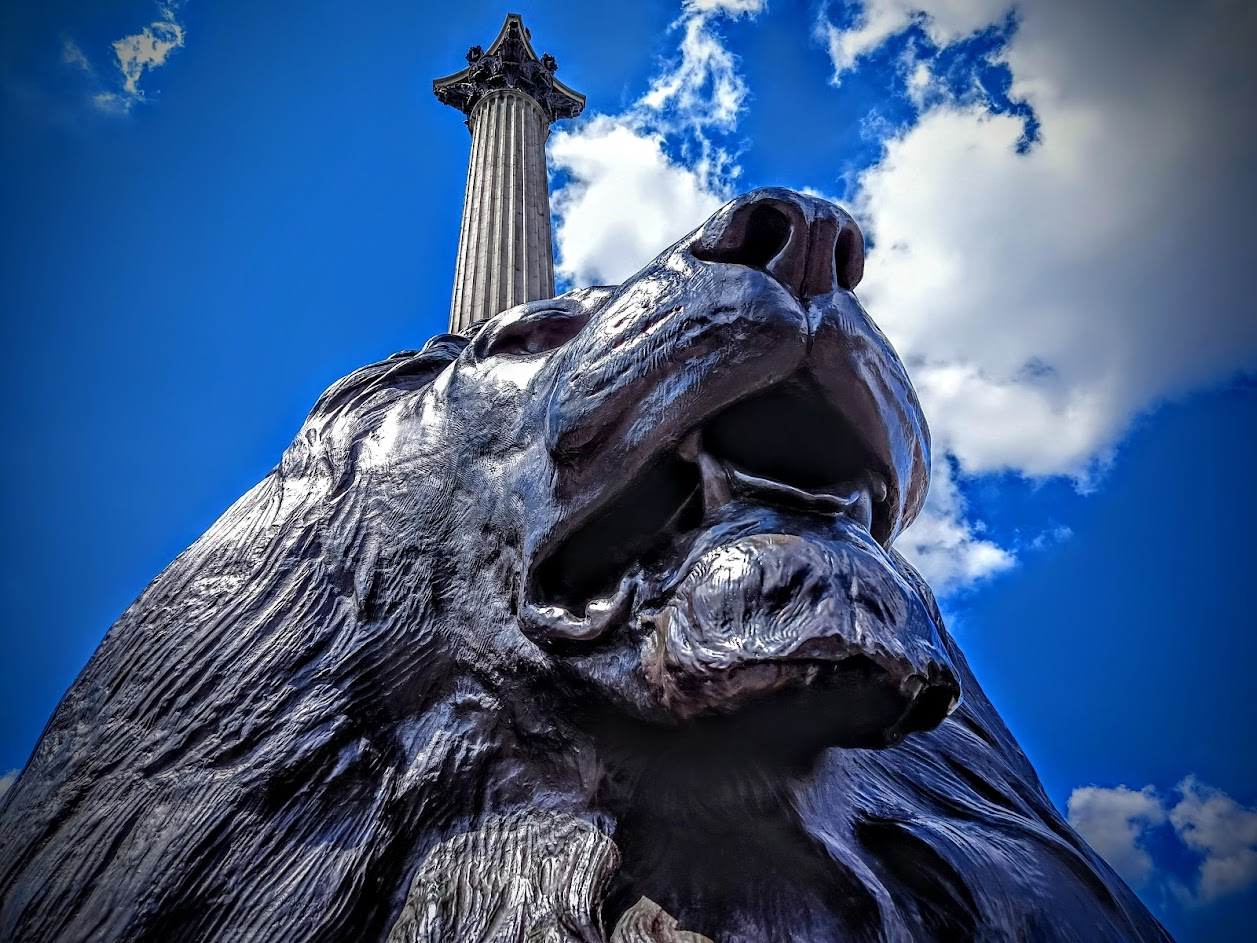
One of the Landseer Lions with the column behind, June 2021

== See also ==
- Berlin Victory Column
- Congress Column
- July Column
- Sigismund's Column
- Nelson Entertainment Production company named after and who's logo features the monument.
