= Gladys Peto =

British author and fashion designer (1890–1977)

- Gladys Peto
- Born: 19 June 1890; Cookham, Berkshire, England
- Died: 21 May 1977 (aged 86); Limavady, Northern Ireland
- Occupations: Artist, fashion designer, illustrator and writer
- Spouse: Cuthbert Lindsay Emmerson

Gladys Emma Peto (19 June 1890 – 21 May 1977) was an English artist, fashion designer, illustrator and writer of children's books.

== Early life and education ==
Peto was born on 19 June 1890 in Cookham, the only daughter of William Peto and Mary Jane, née Reeves, of Cannon Court Farm, Maidenhead.

She attended Maidenhead High School, then Harvington College in Ealing. She later went on to study at the Maidenhead School of Arts in 1908, and London's School of Art in 1911. She undertook a design course at the John Hassall Correspondence school in 1918.

== Career ==
Peto created drawings for "The letters of Phrynette" in The Sketch. This was similar to the series "Letters of Eve" in The Tatler. The latter was illustrated by Annie Fish and there was a court case.

Her family was not especially artistic. As a girl in Maidenhead, she would go out "in her father's trap" and notice interesting people along the way. She would get home and sketch them.

She moved with her husband, who had retired from the Army, to Northern Ireland in 1939 and retired from commercial art in 1946. She devoted her remaining years to painting landscapes in watercolors and to drawing and cultivating flowers. She suffered a stroke in 1970 that paralyzed her right, and dominant, hand, but continued to draw, paint and write with her left hand.

In the 1930s, it was the "in" thing to wear a Peto dress. Peto's advertising illustrations for Allen and Hanbury's infant formula, Ovaltine and many other products were featured in magazines and posters.

In 1922, she married Dr Cuthbert Lindsay Emmerson of the Royal Army Medical Corps, and she traveled with him to Malta, Cyprus and Egypt. He retired in 1946 as a Colonel and died in 1977. She died in the same year on 21 May 1977 at Roe Valley Hospital in Limavady, Northern Ireland. The funeral service was held on 25 May 1977 at Bovevagh Parish Church, County Londonderry, followed by interment in the churchyard.
