= Bryant (surname) =

- Pronunciation: /ˈbɹaɪ.ənt/

Origin
- Region of origin: England

Bryant is an English surname, a variant of "Bryan". Notable people and characters with the surname include:

== A ==
- Aidy Bryant (born 1987), American actress and comedian
- Albert Bryant Jr. (born 1952), American general
- Alexander Bryant or Briant (1556–1581), English Jesuit martyr
- Anita Bryant (1940–2024), American singer and gay rights opponent
- Anthony J. Bryant (born 1961), American historian of Japan
- Antonio Bryant (born 1981), American football player
- Arthur Bryant (1899–1985), British historian
- Austin Bryant (born 1996), American football player

== B ==
- Bart Bryant (1962–2022), American golfer
- Bear Bryant (1913–1983), American college football coach
- Benjamin Bryant (disambiguation), several people
- Bob Bryant (disambiguation), multiple people
- Bobby Bryant (disambiguation), multiple people
- Boudleaux Bryant (1920–1987), American songwriter
- Brad Bryant (born 1954), American golfer
- Brady Bryant (born 1982), American soccer player
- Brandon Bryant (disambiguation), multiple people
- Brooke Bryant (born 2000), American ice hockey player
- Bunyan Bryant (1935–2024), American environmental justice advocate and academic

== C ==
- C. Farris Bryant (1914–2002), American politician
- Carter Bryant (born 1964), American toy designer
- Carter Bryant (basketball) (born 2005), American basketball player
- Castell V. Bryant (1938–2026), American academic administrator
- Charles Bryant (disambiguation), multiple people
- Charlotte Bryant (1903–1936), British convicted poisoner
- Chase Bryant (born 1993), American country singer and songwriter
- Chris Bryant (born 1962), British politician
- Christian Bryant (born 1992), American football player
- Clay Bryant (1911–1999), American baseball player
- Clora Bryant (1927–2019), American jazz trumpeter
- Cleve Bryant (1947–2023), American college football coach
- Cobee Bryant (born 2001), American football player
- Coby Bryant (born 1999), American football player
- Corey Bryant, character in Pretty Little Liars (2022 TV series)
- Cora Mae Bryant (1926–2008), American blues musician

== D ==
- Dan Bryant (disambiguation), multiple people
- David Bryant (disambiguation), multiple people
- Desmond Bryant (born 1985), American football player
- Dez Bryant (born 1988), American football player
- Dezerea Bryant (born 1993), American sprinter
- Diana Bryant (born 1947), Australian judge
- Domingo Bryant (born 1963), American football player
- Donald Bryant (disambiguation), multiple people

== E ==
- Ed Bryant (born 1948), American politician
- Edward Bryant (1945–2017), American writer
- Edwin Bryant (disambiguation), multiple people
- Elijah Bryant (born 1995), American basketball player
- Elizabeth Bangs Bryant (1875–1953), British arachnologist
- Em Bryant (born 1938), American basketball player

== F ==
- Faran Bryant, character in Pretty Little Liars (2022 TV series)
- Felice Bryant (1925–2003), American songwriter
- Fernando Bryant (born 1977), American football player
- Frank Bryant (cricketer) (1909–1984), Australian cricket player and administrator

== G ==
- Gary Bryant Jr. (born 2001), American football player
- Gianna Bryant (2006–2020), American student-athlete
- Gordon Bryant (1914–1991), Australian politician
- Gridley Bryant (1789–1867), American railroad engineer
- Gridley James Fox Bryant (1816–1899), American architect
- Gyude Bryant (1949–2014), Liberian politician

== H ==
- Harold Child Bryant (1886–1968), American outdoors nature educator
- Harrison Bryant (born 1998), American football player
- Henry Bryant (disambiguation), multiple people
- Howard Bryant (born 1968), American sports journalist
- Howard Bryant (politician) (1861–1930), American politician
- Hunter Bryant (born 1998), American football player

== J ==
- Jacky Bryant, fictional character from Virtua Fighter
- Jacob Bryant (1715–1804), British scholar and mythographer
- Jen Bryant (born 1960), American poet, novelist and children's author
- Jennings Bryant (1944–2020), American scientist
- Jim Bryant (disambiguation), multiple people
- Jimmy Bryant (1925–1980), American guitarist
- Joe Bryant (1954–2024), American basketball player, father of Kobe
- John Bryant (disambiguation), multiple people
- Joseph D. Bryant (1845–1914), New York Surgeon General
- Joshua Bryant (1940–2024), American actor, director, author, and speaker
- Joshua P. Bryant, American politician for Arkansas
- Joy Bryant (born 1976), American actress
- Joyce Bryant (1927–2022), American singer and actress
- Julia Cox Bryant (1893–1967), American educator, musician

== K ==
- Karyn Bryant (born 1968), American actress
- Kaylee Bryant (born 1997), American actress and model
- Keedron Bryant (born 2007), American singer
- Kelly Bryant (born 1996), American football player
- Kelvin Bryant (born 1960), American football player
- Kenzie "Pokey" Bryant (born 2001), American voice actress
- Kimberly Bryant (born 1967), American engineer and founder of Black Girls Code
- Kobe Bryant (1978–2020), American basketball player
- Kris Bryant (born 1992), American baseball player

== L ==
- Lane Bryant, American clothes designer
- Lori Bryant-Woolridge (born 1958), American writer
- Louise Bryant (1885–1936), American journalist
- Lucas Bryant (born 1978), Canadian actor

== M ==
- Ma'Khia Bryant (1994/1995 – 2021), American teen fatally shot by police
- Mabel Bryant (1883–1948), English field hockey and cricket player and umpire
- Maida Bryant (1926–2016), New Zealand nurse, local politician, and community leader
- Marcus Bryant (disambiguation), multiple people
- Margot Bryant (1897–1988), British actress
- Mark Bryant (disambiguation), multiple people
- Martin Bryant (born 1967), Australian spree killer
- Martin Bryant (programmer) (born 1958), British computer programmer
- Mary Bryant (1765–after 1794), Cornish convict transported to Australia
- Matt Bryant (born 1975), American football player
- Matt Bryant (footballer) (born 1970), English football player
- Michael Bryant (disambiguation), multiple people
- Miriam Bryant (born 1991), Swedish-Finnish singer-songwriter
- Myles Bryant (born 1998), American football player

== N ==
- Nicola Bryant (born 1960), British actress

== O ==
- Orshawante Bryant (born 1978), American football player

== P ==
- Pat Bryant (born 2002), American football player
- Paul W. Bryant Jr. (born c. 1945), American banker, investor, and philanthropist; son of Bear
- Peter Bryant (disambiguation), several people
- Phil Bryant (born 1954), American politician
- Precious Bryant (1942–2013), American musician

== R ==
- Ralph Bryant (born 1961), American baseball player
- Ralph C. Bryant (1877–1939), American professor of forestry
- Randal Bryant (born 1952), American computer scientist
- Ray Bryant (1931–2011), American jazz pianist, composer
- Red Bryant (born 1984), American football player
- Rick Bryant (1948–2019), New Zealand singer
- Romby Bryant (born 1979), Canadian football player
- Ron Bryant (born 1947), American baseball player
- Ronny Rey Bryant (aka Baby Bash) (born 1975), American rapper

== S ==
- Samuel W. Bryant (1877–1938), American admiral
- Sarah Bryant (disambiguation), multiple people
- Scott Poulson-Bryant, American music journalist
- Serderius Bryant (born 1991), American football player
- Stanley Bryant (born 1985), American football player
- Stephen Bryant, English violinist
- Stephen Corey Bryant (1981–2025), American executed spree killer
- Steve Bryant (American football) (born 1959), American football player
- Steve Bryant (footballer) (born 1953), English footballer
- Steven Bryant (composer) (born 1972), American composer and conductor

== T ==
- Terl Bryant, British drummer, member of the band Iona
- Tom Bryant (disambiguation), multiple people
- Ty Bryant (born 2004), American football player

== V ==
- Vanessa Bryant (born 1982), American philanthropist, nonprofit executive, and model
- Ventell Bryant (born 1996), American football player

== W ==
- Wallace Bryant (born 1959), American basketball player
- Wanda G. Bryant (born 1956), American judge
- Waymond Bryant (born 1952), American football player
- Wayne R. Bryant (born 1947), American politician
- Wendell Bryant (born 1980), American football player
- William Bryant (disambiguation), multiple people
- William Cullen Bryant (1794–1878), American poet and journalist
- Winston Bryant (born 1938), Arkansas Lieutenant Governor and attorney general

== Z ==
- Zack Bryant (born 1997), American basketball player

== See also ==
- Bryant (disambiguation)
- Briant (disambiguation)
- Bryan (disambiguation)
- Senator Bryant (disambiguation)
