= Bryant =

Bryant may refer to:

== Organizations ==
- Bryant Bank, a bank in Alabama, United States
- Bryant Electric Company, an American manufacturer of electrical components
- Bryant Homes, a British house builder, part of Taylor Woodrow
- Bryant University (formerly Bryant College), a four-year college in Smithfield, Rhode Island
- Bryant & Stratton College, a proprietary college in the United States

== People ==
- Bryant (surname)
- Bryant Crawford (born 1997), American basketball player
- Bryant Dunston (born 1986), American-Armenian basketball player
- Bryant Gumbel (born 1948), American television journalist and sportscaster
- Bryant Haines (born 1985), American football coach
- Bryant Koback (born 1998), American football player
- Bryant Mix (born 1972), American football player
- Bryant McKinnie (born 1979), American football player
- Bryant McFadden (born 1981), American football player
- Bryant Myers (born 1998), Puerto Rican reggaeton singer
- Bryant Reeves (born 1973), American basketball player
- Bryant Wesco (born 2005), American football player
- Bryant Wolfin, American politician

== Places ==
- Bryant, Saskatchewan, Canada
- Bryant Range, in the South Island of New Zealand

=== United States ===
- Bryant, Alabama
- Bryant, Arkansas
- Bryant, Illinois
- Bryant, Indiana
- Bryant, Iowa
- Bryant, Michigan
- Bryant, Minneapolis, Minnesota
- Bryant, Missouri
- Bryant, South Dakota
- Bryant, Seattle, Washington
- Bryant, Wisconsin
- Bryant Park, at the intersection of 42nd Street and Sixth Avenue, New York City
- Bryant Pond (disambiguation)
- Bryant Township (disambiguation)

== See also ==
- Briant (disambiguation)
- Bryan (disambiguation)
- Senator Bryant (disambiguation)
