= Peter Bryant (disambiguation) =

Peter Bryant (1923–2006) was a British TV producer.

Peter Bryant may also refer to:

- P. James Bryant (Peter James Bryant, fl. 1898–1929), American pastor
- Peter James Bryant (fl. from 1989), American actor
- Peter W. Bryant (1853–1912), lawyer and judge in Tampa, Florida
- Peter Bryant, pseudonym of Peter George (author) (1924–1966), Welsh author
- Peter Bryant (1767–1820), American doctor and politician, father of William Cullen Bryant and Cyrus Bryant

== See also ==
- Bryant (surname)
