= Annamma Betta =

Coordinates: 12.917478°N 77.537423°E

Sri Hanumagiri kshetra is a major Hindu pilgrim centre in the city of Bengaluru (Bangalore), Karnataka, and is situated in the Uttarahalli and Arehalli hill ranges. This hillock is also referred to as Annamma Betta or Yesu Betta or even Shilube Betta by some folk.

The hillock is famous for bearing two sacred Hindu temples at the top. A small hanuman temple near the peak which naturally gives rise to the Hill's name.

A bigger temple dedicated to Arakeshwara swamy(shiva) is located a hundred metres away and is considered a special place by devotees.

== Legend ==
According to Indian folklore, the hill is where the sage Mandavya undertook his ‘Tapas’ (meditation) and prayed for the well-being of the world. Local people hold that ‘Hanumagiri’ is part of Sanjeevini mountain. The hill is believed to have originated after it was "dropped" by Lord Hanuman as he was bringing it to cure Lord Ram and his brother, Lakshman, who were injured during Ramayana.

== Events ==
Hallmark celebrations at the hill top include few annual events where scores of people throng the hillock.

Karthika deepotsavam where a giant lantern akin to the one atop Arunachalam hill at Tiruvannamalai is lit as per shastras on pournami day is a delight to the eyes and is visible till tens of kilometres away. The event is accompanied by grand poojas and festivities and attracts scores of devotees.

Mahashivaratri is another major festivity at the Arakeshwara temple. On the day of hanuma jayanti, pooja and japa are offered at the hanuman temple.

Sri Rama Navami is also celebrated yearly at the location since lord hanuman is considered the most ardous devotee of Lord Ram.

== Surroundings ==
The place was untouched with natural beauty for a long time and was a paradise for birdwatchers. The place was filled with diverse flora and fauna, especially peacocks which were plenty in number but their numbers have dwindled significantly thanks to human activities.

These days the trees are uprooted and the lush greenery is blackened around the hill, and the same is the fate of small hillocks in and around Bengaluru as a side effect of rapid development.

A huge government degree college is being set up on the route downhill and is projected to be a major educational centre in the area.

Adjacent to the college, a popular temple complex dedicated to Venkateswara Swamy is present. The main garbhagudi griha carries a tall murthy of Venkateshwara swamy and attracts regular visitors on a daily basis. Devotees can also find temples dedicated to narasimha swamy, parvathi devi and sri ganesh in the premises.

== Activities ==
This hill is the centre of other activities such as celebrating International Yoga Day and a kite festival.

== Alternative beliefs ==
The legend of Annamma dates back to Tipu Sultan's era. Uttarahalli then a Christian pocket was lying by the side of Tipu's cavalry path. During that period according the legend the lonely girl Annamma had fallen prey to the Mysuru soldiers and in the bid of escape she fell down from the hill. Repenting on this the soldiers have buried Annamma and erected a cross on the grave. Thus Annamma became the village deity and people from all walks started adoring her. Till today the hill is popularly called as Annamma Betta (betta = hill) and one can see a huge steel cross on the tip of the hill erected by Rev.Fr. Briand.

During Lent the Christians follow the Way of the Cross. The pictures showing Jesus accepting the death sentence and carrying the cross to the Mount Calvary or Golgotha is being recited along the 14 stations is called the 'Way of the Cross'. Every Friday evenings during Lent the Churches witness this performance of the Cross procession. The same Way of the Cross if performed in the hillock Annamma Betta.

Annamma Betta is the seat of the Stations of the Cross for two centuries. The day that is the fifth Sunday (this year it is on 21 March 2021) of the Lent the surface of the mountain will be filled with the devotees climbing the mountain surface.

At the foot of the hill is the legendary Annamma's cemetery and there is also a Catholic Church and an adoration chapel. Carrying his own cross, mourning at 14 different stations gives a bare witness to a man scaling his life overcoming all the hurdles. Thus the Way of the Cross at the Annamma betta unveils the different faces of devotion.
