= Donald Bryant =

Donald Bryant may refer to:

- Donald "Isa" Hamm Bryant (1943–2007), American author, historian and activist
- Don Bryant (songwriter) (1942–2025), American singer and songwriter
- Don Bryant (baseball) (1941–2015), catcher and coach in Major League Baseball
- Donald A. Bryant (1950–2024), American bioscientist and author
- Donald L. Bryant Jr. (1942–2025), American businessman, art collector, vineyard owner and philanthropist
