= Henry Bryant =

Henry Bryant may refer to:

- Henry Bryant (botanist) (1721–1799), English botanist
- Henry Bryant (naturalist) (1820–1867), American physician and naturalist
- Henry Beadman Bryant (1824–1892), author and co-founder and namesake of Bryant & Stratton College and Bryant University in Smithfield, Rhode Island
- Henry Charles Bryant (1812–1890), English portrait and landscape painter
- Henry Grier Bryant (1859–1932), American explorer and writer
- Henry Bryant Bigelow (1879–1967), American oceanographer and marine biologist
