= George H. Williams Townhouses =

Historic building in Portland, Oregon, U.S.

- U.S. National Register of Historic Places
- U.S. Historic district – Contributing property
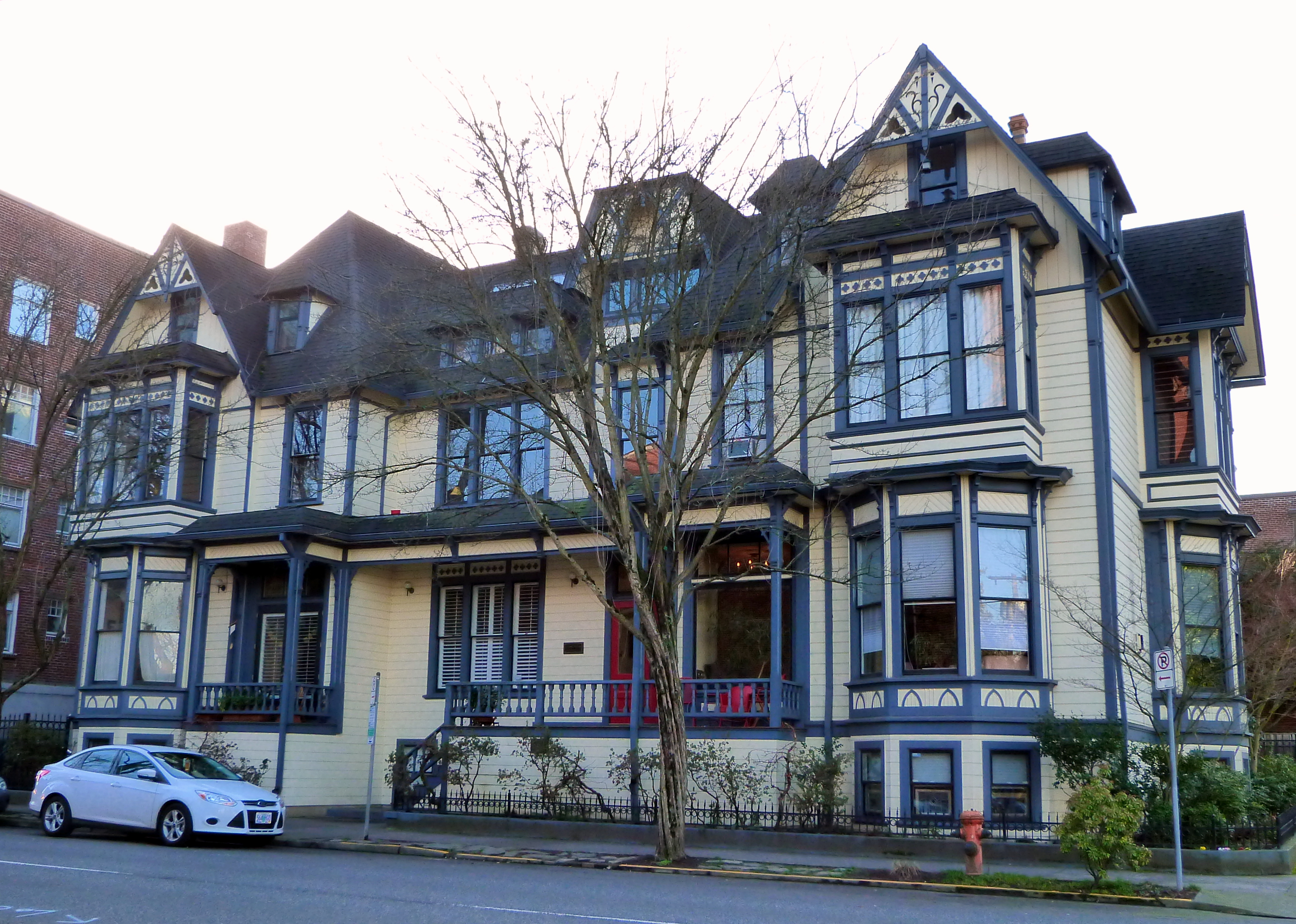
- The townhouses (exterior) in 2016

- Location within Portland, Oregon
- Location: 133 NW 18th Avenue; Portland, Oregon
- Coordinates: 45°31′27″N 122°41′22″W
- Built: 1883
- Architectural style: Late Victorian
- Part of: Alphabet Historic District (ID00001293)
- NRHP reference No.: 84003097
- Added to NRHP: March 22, 1984

The George H. Williams Townhouses, commonly known as "The Lawn" apartments, located in northwest Portland, Oregon, United States, are listed on the National Register of Historic Places. The three-unit townhouse structure was built for, and originally owned by, George Henry Williams, a former United States Attorney General, United States Senator (for Oregon), and Oregon Supreme Court Chief Justice. Later, Williams also served as mayor of Portland. The townhouses were built as a business investment, and Williams did not reside in the building. The structure was moved in 1922. Although always situated within the block bounded by NW 18th and 19th Avenues, and NW Couch and Davis Streets, it was originally in the block's northwest corner, i.e. at the southeast corner of the intersection of NW 19th and Davis. In 1922, it was moved east within the same block, to the corner at NW 18th and Davis.

== See also ==
- National Register of Historic Places listings in Northwest Portland, Oregon
