= William Bryant =

William, Willie, Bill or Billy Bryant may refer to:

== Sport ==
- William Bryant (footballer, born 1874) (1874–?), played for Rotherham Town, Manchester United and Blackburn Rovers
- William Bryant (footballer, born 1899) (1899–1986), England international who played for Millwall
- Billy Bryant (1913–1975), footballer who played for Wrexham and Manchester United in the 1930s
- Bill Bryant (American football) (born 1951), American football player
- Bill Bryant (cricketer) (1906–1995), Australian cricketer
- Bill Bryant (golf executive) (1914–1983), American golf executive
- Bill Bryant (rugby league) (1940–2019), English rugby league footballer who played in the 1950s, 1960s and 1970s

== Other people ==
- William Bryant (actor) (1924–2001), American actor
- William Bryant (convict) (1757–1791), convict on First Fleet to New South Wales
- William Bryant (industrialist), co-founder of the Bryant & May match company
- William Bryant (physician) (1730–1783), American physician
- William B. Bryant (1911–2005), senior federal judge and the first black federal prosecutor in the United States
- William Bradley Bryant, superintendent of public schools for the U.S. state of Georgia
- William Cullen Bryant (1794–1878), American poet
- William Maud Bryant (1933–1969), United States Army soldier and Medal of Honor recipient during the Vietnam War
- William P. Bryant (1806–1860), American state supreme court judge in Oregon Territory
- William R. Bryant Jr. (1938–2020), American politician
- Willie Bryant (1908–1964), American jazz musician and DJ
- William Bryant, Confederate spy in the American Civil War
- Bill Bryant (politician) (born 1957), Washington State politician

== See also ==
- William Bryant Octagon House, historic house in Massachusetts
- William Jennings Bryan (1860–1925), American politician
- William O'Bryan (1778–1868), English Methodist preacher
- William Bryan (disambiguation)
