= Thomas Nelson (Oregon judge) =

American judge

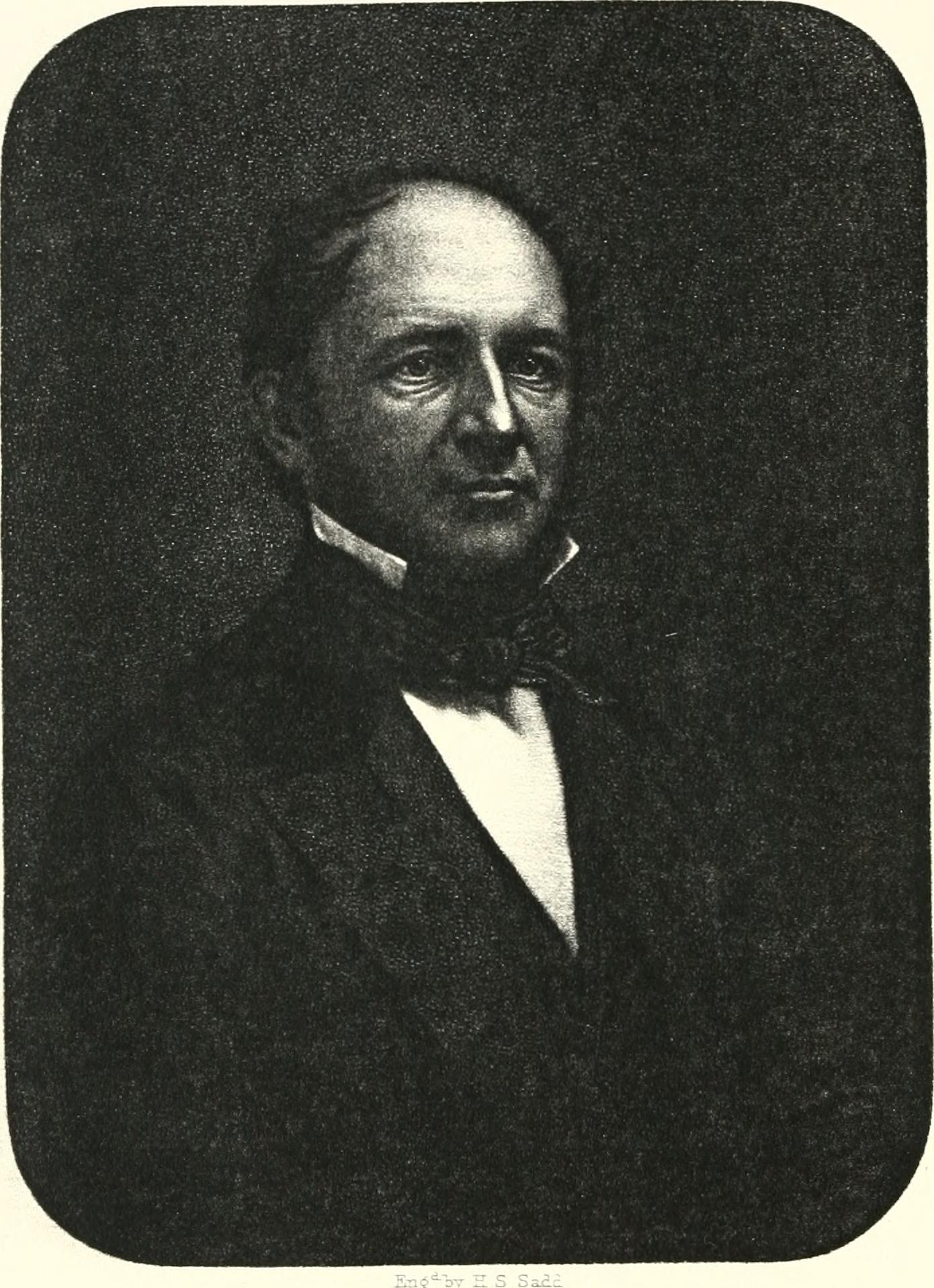

2nd Chief Justice of the Oregon Supreme Court
- In office 1850–1853
- Preceded by: William P. Bryant
- Succeeded by: George Henry Williams

3rd Justice of the Oregon Supreme Court
- In office 1850–1853
- Appointed by: Millard Fillmore
- Preceded by: William P. Bryant
- Succeeded by: George Henry Williams

Personal details
- Born: January 23, 1819 Peekskill, New York, U.S.
- Died: July 25, 1907 (aged 88) New York City, New York, U.S.

Thomas Nelson (January 23, 1819 – July 25, 1907) was an American attorney and judge. He was appointed as the 2nd Chief Justice of the Oregon Supreme Court serving from 1850 to 1853. A native of the U.S. state of New York, he lived in Oregon only during his term as chief justice.

== Early life ==
Nelson was born January 23, 1819, in Peekskill, New York. There he passed the bar and received his license to practice law in 1840.

== Legal career ==
In 1850 U.S. President Millard Fillmore appointed Nelson to the territorial supreme court of Oregon to replace William P. Bryant. Nelson arrived at Oregon City in April 1850. He served until 1853 when his term ended. During this same time he served as chief justice of the court, and then left Oregon in August 1853 to return to New York. There he practiced law until he died in New York on July 25, 1907, at the age of 88.
