= Bryant Pond =

Bryant Pond may refer to:

- Bryant Pond, Maine, also known as Lake Christopher, a lake in Maine
- Bryant Pond, Maine, a village in Maine on the shores of Lake Christopher
- Bryant Pond (New York), a lake in New York
