= Bobby Bryant (disambiguation) =

Bobby Bryant may refer to:

- Bobby Bryant (musician) (1934–1998), American jazz trumpeter
- Bobby Bryant (born 1944), American football player
- Bobby Lynn Bryant (born 1992), American boxer

== See also ==
- Bob Bryant (disambiguation)
- Robert Bryant (disambiguation)
