= David Bryant =

David Bryant may refer to:

- David Ezekiel Bryant (1845–1910), United States federal judge
- Charles David Jones Bryant (1883–1937), Australian marine artist
- David Bryant (bowls) (1931–2020), English bowls player and world champion
- David Bryant Mumford (born 1937), American mathematician
- David Bryant (musician) (born 1970), Canadian musician and film director
- David R. Bryant (born 1936), American chemist
- David Bryant (cricketer) (born 1950), English cricketer
- David Bryant (triathlete) (born 1989), Australian triathlete
- David Bryant (rugby union) (born 1967), Welsh rugby union player

David Bryant (Browns Run Road) And Sheriff Of WWE
