= Briant =

Briant may refer to:

Places

- Briant, Saône-et-Loire, a commune in the region of Bourgogne in eastern France

People

- Alexander Briant (1556–1581), an English Jesuit and martyr, executed at Tyburn
- Aurelia "Oriel" Briant (1947–1984), an Argentine English teacher that was kidnapped and murdered in 1984
- Frank Briant (1863–1934), a British Liberal politician and Civil Servant
- Gavin Briant (born 1969), a former Zimbabwean cricket player
- George Briant (1828-1914), an Australian cricket player
- Michael E. Briant (born 1942), a British television director
- Pierre Briant (born 1940), a French Iranologist, Professor of History and Civilisation of the Achaemenid World
- Robin Briant (born 1939), New Zealand doctor
- Shane Briant (1946–2021), an English actor and novelist
- Vincent Briant (born 1986), a French professional football player

Fictional characters

- Claudia Briant, from the British soap opera Doctors

== See also ==
- Briand (disambiguation)
- Bryant (disambiguation)
