= Senator Bryan =

Senator Bryan may refer to:

== Members of the United States Senate ==
- Nathan Philemon Bryan (1872–1935), U.S. Senator from Florida from 1911 to 1917
- Richard Bryan (born 1937), U.S. Senator from Nevada from 1989 to 2001
- William James Bryan (1876–1908), U.S. Senator from Florida from 1907 to 1908

== United States state senate members ==
- Charles Henry Bryan (1822–1877), California State Senate
- Hob Bryan (born 1952), Mississippi State Senate
- James W. Bryan (1874–1956), Washington State Senate
- James William Bryan (1853–1903), Kentucky State Senate
- Rob Bryan (born 1971), North Carolina State Senate
- Silas Bryan (1822–1880), Illinois State Senate

== See also ==
- Senator O'Brien (disambiguation)
- Senator Bryant (disambiguation)
