= Senator Bryant =

Senator Bryant may refer to:

- Angela Bryant (born 1951), North Carolina State Senate
- Arthur Lafayette Bryant (1888–1965), Florida State Senate
- Bristoe Bryant (1906–1986), Michigan State Senate
- Bruce S. Bryant (born 1961), Maine State Senate
- George E. Bryant (1832–1907), Wisconsin State Senate
- Joshua P. Bryant (fl. 2020s), Arkansas State Senate
- Kevin L. Bryant (born 1967), South Carolina State Senate
- Neil Bryant (fl. 1990s), Oregon State Senate
- Wayne R. Bryant (born 1947), New Jersey State Senate
- William P. Bryant (1806–1860), Indiana State Senate

== See also ==
- Bryant (surname)
- Senator Bryan (disambiguation)
