= Senator O'Brien =

Senator O'Brien may refer to:

- Anna Belle Clement O'Brien (1923–2009), Tennessee State Senate
- Charles H. O'Brien (1920–2007), Tennessee State Senate
- Duncan T. O'Brien (1895–1938), New York State Senate
- Henry L. O'Brien (1869–1935), New York State Senate
- James H. O'Brien (1860–1924), New York State Senate
- James O'Brien (U.S. Congressman) (1841–1907), New York State Senate
- Jay O'Brien (Virginia politician) (born 1951), Virginia State Senate
- Jeremiah O'Brien (Maine politician) (1778–1858), Maine State Senate
- Leo P. O'Brien (1893–1968), Wisconsin State Senate
- Margaret O'Brien (politician) (born 1973), Michigan State Senate
- Sean O'Brien (Ohio politician) (born 1969), Ohio State Senate
- Shannon O'Brien (Massachusetts politician) (born 1959), Massachusetts State Senate
- Ted O'Brien (born 1956), New York State Senate

== See also ==
- James O'Bryan Jr. (born 1956), U.S. Virgin Islands State Senate
- Senator Bryan (disambiguation)
