= George Henry Williams =

American judge

George Williams
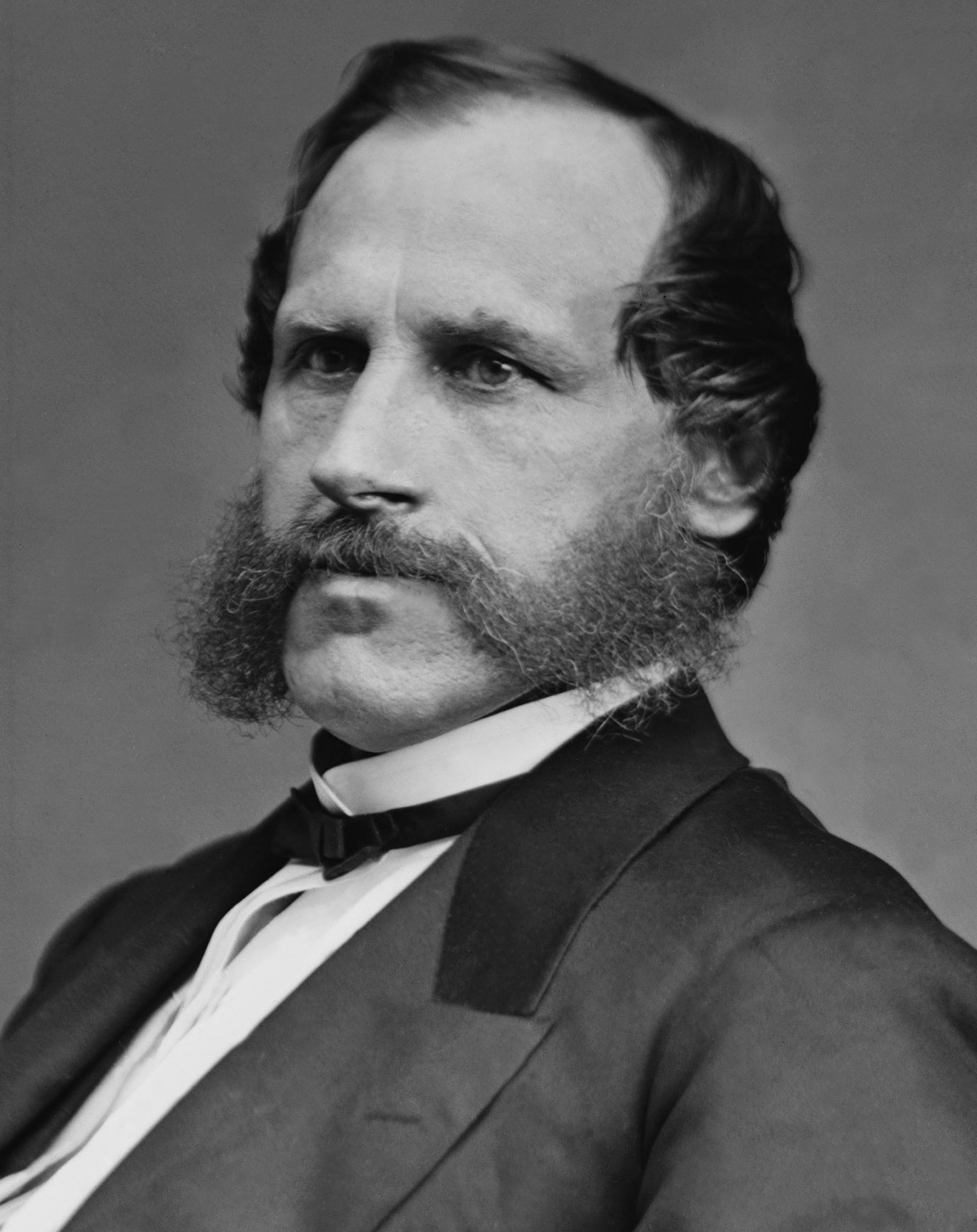

34th Mayor of Portland
- In office June 2, 1902 – June 2, 1905
- Preceded by: Henry Rowe
- Succeeded by: Harry Lane

32nd United States Attorney General
- In office December 14, 1871 – April 25, 1875
- President: Ulysses Grant
- Preceded by: Amos Akerman
- Succeeded by: Edwards Pierrepont

United States Senator from Oregon
- In office March 4, 1865 – March 3, 1871
- Preceded by: Benjamin Harding
- Succeeded by: James Kelly

3rd Chief Justice of the Oregon Supreme Court
- In office 1853–1858
- Appointed by: Franklin Pierce
- Preceded by: Thomas Nelson
- Succeeded by: Aaron Waite

District Judge in Oregon
- In office 1847–1852

Personal details
- Born: March 26, 1823 New Lebanon, New York, U.S.
- Died: April 4, 1910 (aged 87) Portland, Oregon, U.S.
- Party: Democratic (Before 1864); Republican (1864–1910)
- Spouse(s): Kate Van Antwerp; Kate Hughes George

George Henry Williams (March 26, 1823 – April 4, 1910) was an American judge and politician. He served as chief justice of the Oregon Supreme Court, was the 32nd attorney general of the United States, and was elected Oregon's U.S. senator, and served one term. Williams, as U.S. senator, authored and supported legislation that allowed the U.S. military to be deployed in Reconstruction of the southern states to allow for an orderly process of re-admittance into the United States. Williams was the first presidential Cabinet member to be appointed from the Pacific Coast. As attorney general under President Ulysses S. Grant, Williams continued the prosecutions that shut down the Ku Klux Klan. He had to contend with controversial election disputes in Reconstructed southern states. President Grant and Williams legally recognized P. B. S. Pinchback as the first African American state governor. Williams ruled that the Virginius, a gun-running ship delivering men and munitions to Cuban revolutionaries, which was captured by Spain during the Virginius Affair, did not have the right to bear the U.S. flag. However, he also argued that Spain did not have the right to execute American crew members. Nominated for Supreme Court Chief Justice by President Grant, Williams failed to be confirmed by the U.S. Senate primarily due to Williams's opposition to U.S. Attorney A. C. Gibbs, his former law partner, who refused to stop investigating Republican fraud in the special congressional election that resulted in a victory for Democrat James Nesmith.

In 1875, Williams resigned as U.S. Attorney General after his wife was accused of taking bribes from the custom house firm Pratt & Boyd, which attempted to persuade the U.S. Justice Department to drop litigation against the company. After his resignation, Williams took part in the effort to count Florida ballots for Rutherford B. Hayes during the controversial presidential election of 1876. Williams returned to Oregon, resumed private law practice, and was elected Portland's mayor, serving two terms from 1902 to 1905. Williams, at the age of 83, was indicted for not enforcing restrictions on gambling; he was acquitted and served out the rest of his term as mayor.

== Early life and law career ==
George Henry Williams was born in upstate New York, New Lebanon, Columbia County, on March 26, 1823. When he was very young his family moved to Onondaga County, where was educated in public and private schools, including Pompey Academy. Williams studied law under Daniel Gott, and was admitted to the bar in 1844. Williams then moved to Iowa Territory, where he practiced law in Fort Madison.

=== Judicial Career ===
After Iowa was admitted to statehood, Williams was elected district judge in 1847 in Oregon, serving until 1852. In 1853, Williams was appointed Chief Justice of Oregon Territory by President Franklin Pierce. At the 1857 Oregon Constitutional Convention, Williams urged that slavery be made illegal in Oregon as a requirement for statehood. Williams advocated unsuccessfully that a woman's property not be subject to her husband's debts.

In the early years of the Oregon Supreme Court, the three justices also rode circuit and acted as trial level judges. As a presiding judge while riding circuit, Williams presided over the Holmes v. Ford case that freed a slave family since slavery was illegal in the territory. In 1857, he was a member of the Oregon Constitutional Convention held before the establishment of Oregon as a U.S. state. Williams remained on the court until 1858 when he resigned from the bench. He then moved to Portland, Oregon, where he resumed the practice of law.

Williams, a Democrat, supported Stephen Douglas during the presidential election of 1860. Williams attended the Oregon Union convention of 1862, having opposed slavery, and was the chairman of the Election Committee.

== U.S. Senator ==
In 1864 Williams, having changed over to the Republican Party, was elected to the United States Senate; he served one term, from 1865 to 1871. In 1865, Sen. Williams, a Radical Republican, was appointed to the Committee on Finance and Public Lands and the Joint Committee on Reconstruction. In 1866 Williams authored the Tenure of Office Act, passed by Congress in 1867 over President Andrew Johnson's veto, that limited the President in removing Cabinet officers. This act was vital to the Republican Party, having saved the offices of appointed Republicans throughout the United States. In 1867, he authored and supported the Military Reconstruction Act, passed by Congress over President Johnson's veto, that authorized U.S. military control of the South. This act permanently restored and Reconstructed the formerly Confederate states in rebellion back into the United States in an orderly and peaceful manner using the strength of the U.S. military. In 1868, Williams and his senatorial colleague Henry W. Corbett voted guilty in President Andrew Johnson's impeachment trial; Johnson was acquitted by one vote. Williams was defeated in the election of 1870.

== U.S. Joint High Commissioner ==
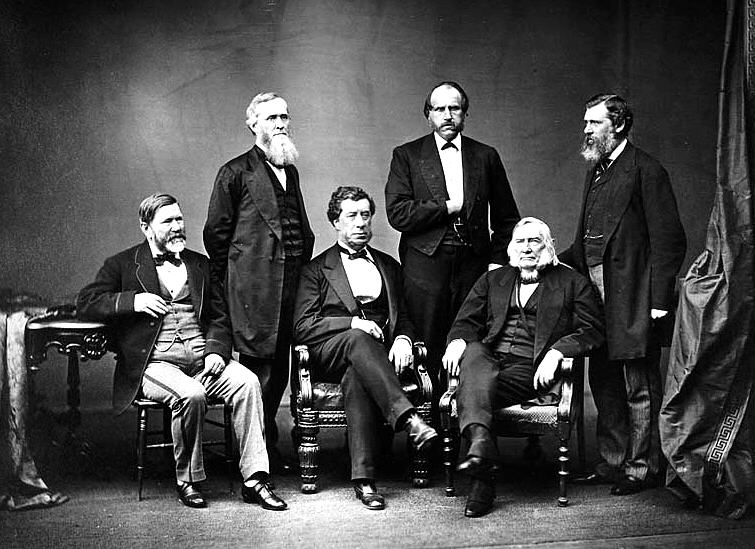
U.S. Joint High Commission in Washington, D.C. Williams center standing. Brady, 1871

In 1871, President Grant appointed Williams one of six U.S. Joint High Commissioners to negotiate a settlement treaty between Britain and the U.S. in Washington, D.C., over the Alabama Claims and America's Northwest boundary between the U.S. and Canada. Six representatives had been chosen to represent British and Canadian interests making a total of twelve High Commissioners. Williams was chosen to be on the U.S. treaty commission due to his experience and career in the Pacific Northwest. Williams proved to be a valuable member of the U.S. Commission and served in this position with dignity. In addition to settling the Alabama claims against Britain for allowing Confederate ships to be armed in British ports, at stake was the U.S. Northwest border running through the Rosario Strait. The U.S. desired that the boundary run through the Haro Strait, however, this became a highly contentious issue between the U.S., Britain, and Canada. The Washington, D.C., treaty Commissioners finally decided that the Emperor of Germany, William I, would settle the boundary matter. Williams was able to convince the Committee that the German Emperor needed to strictly interpret the Treaty of 1846 and that the boundary be determined by the most used channel, the Haro Strait. Through Williams's efforts, the German Emperor finally chose the Haro Strait as the Northwest boundary between the U.S. and Canada; the U.S. received the San Juan Islands.

== U.S. Attorney General ==
In December 1871, during later Reconstruction, President Grant appointed Williams as Attorney General of the United States; he served three years until 1875. His appointment was made to satisfy demands by Pacific Coast politicians that the region be represented in the cabinet. Williams was also the legal counsel for the Alaska Improvement Company in which Grant was a shareholder. President Grant's southern Reconstruction policy worked primarily through Williams's Justice Department supported by Grant's Secretary of War, William W. Belknap.

=== Prosecution of Klan ===
Attorney General Williams continued to prosecute the Ku Klux Klan until December 1872 when he issued a clemency policy toward the South. The Justice Department had been inundated by multiple caseloads against the Klan and did not have the manpower to effectively prosecute all of them. Williams finished his prosecution of the remaining Klan cases in the Spring of 1873. Williams believed continued prosecutions of the Klan was unnecessary and was concerned over negative public reaction to the Klan prosecutions. The suppression of the Klan led to African American turnout at the polls throughout the South, and Grant was re-elected in part due to blacks voting for Grant.

=== Toured the South (1872) ===
During the presidential election of 1872, Attorney General Williams toured the Southern states advocating President Grant's Southern Reconstruction policy through public speeches. Prominent Southern cities that Williams visited and spoke at included Richmond, Virginia; Savannah, Georgia; and Charleston, South Carolina. Through Williams’ efforts, Southern states went over to the Republican ticket, including Virginia, South Carolina, and Arkansas. This was the last time that Republicans had a majority victory in the South after the Democratic Party took control of all of the Southern Reconstructed states in 1877, known as the “Solid South”. No Republican presidential candidate would win any former Confederate state until Warren G. Harding carried Tennessee in 1920, and the Democratic Party would carry a majority of former Confederate states in every presidential election until the party's support for black civil rights caused the defection of almost all the region's white voters in the 1968 election.

=== Alabama election (1872) ===
When election disputes occurred during the Alabama state elections in 1872; both state Democrats and Republicans appealed to U.S. Attorney General Williams for settlement. Both President Grant and Williams thoroughly consulted each other in considering a settlement for the contentious Alabama political crisis. On December 12, 1872, President Grant and George Henry Williams peacefully settled the disputed Alabama state elections between the Democrats and Republicans by issuing five resolutions to Governor David P. Lewis. Gov. Lewis and the Republican legislature agreed to the five resolutions that included a Democratic and Republican representative to make a coordinated count of a disputed election result in Marengo County. Williams had required that the current House resign and the House building be vacated before settling the disputed election returns. Williams also vacated the Alabama Senate while disputed senatorial elections were resolved. In addition to elections, Williams settled per diem compensation disputes for office holders.

=== Louisiana election (1872) ===
During the election of 1872, Louisiana was in political turmoil, having two rival factions contending for control of the state legislature. Democrat John D. McEnery and Republican William P. Kellogg both claimed to have won the governorship; both parties mired in charges of voting fraud. Federal troops led by William H. Emory, in charge of the Department of the Gulf, kept the peace during and immediately after the election. On December 3, Attorney General Williams, at the request of Kellogg, ruled that President Grant would enforce any decision by the United States District Courts. After multiple state Returning Boards failed to resolve the election, U.S. District Court Judge Edmund H. Darrell ordered that Kellogg was the winner of the Louisiana election.

In the meantime, on December 9, U.S. Marshal Stephen B. Packard, who was affiliated with the New Orleans Custom House Gang led by President Grant's brother-in-law (James F. Casey), chose a legislature that impeached sitting Governor Henry Clay Warmoth and put in charge P. B. S. Pinchback, a Kellogg supporter, as the United States' first African American state governor. On December 14, Attorney General Williams informed Warmoth that President Grant recognized Kellogg as the rightful, elected governor of Louisiana. This action upset the McEnery faction, who believed that President Grant and Attorney General Williams had taken sides in a state election. On December 16, Attorney General Williams reaffirmed Kellogg's election, Pinchback as the lawful governor of Louisiana, and recognized other elected Republican candidates and presidential electors.

=== Virginius affair (1873) ===
In October 1873, a privateer gun-running ship flying the American flag, the Virginius, secretly owned by Cuban insurgents during the Cuban Ten Years' War was captured by a Spanish warship. In November, a total of 53 crewmembers, including American and British seamen, were tried and executed by Spanish mercenary, Juan N. Burriel, in Santiago, Cuba. On December 17, the Virginius was turned over to the United States Navy according to an agreement between the U.S. and Spain. On the same day, after an investigation by the U.S. Justice Department, Attorney General Williams ruled that the Virginius had been purchased by fraud and did not have the legal right to carry the American flag, however, he argued that the Spanish did not have the right to capture it on open waters and execute American crewmen, since the United States only had the right to investigate if the Virginius had been legally registered in New York. Williams’ ruling on the ownership of the Virginius ship was a mixture of "pretense, legality, and bluff". Through negotiations, 91 crewmembers were returned to New York and families of those Americans who were executed by Burriel were eventually awarded $80,000 reparations from Spain in 1875.

=== Chief Justice nomination (1873) ===
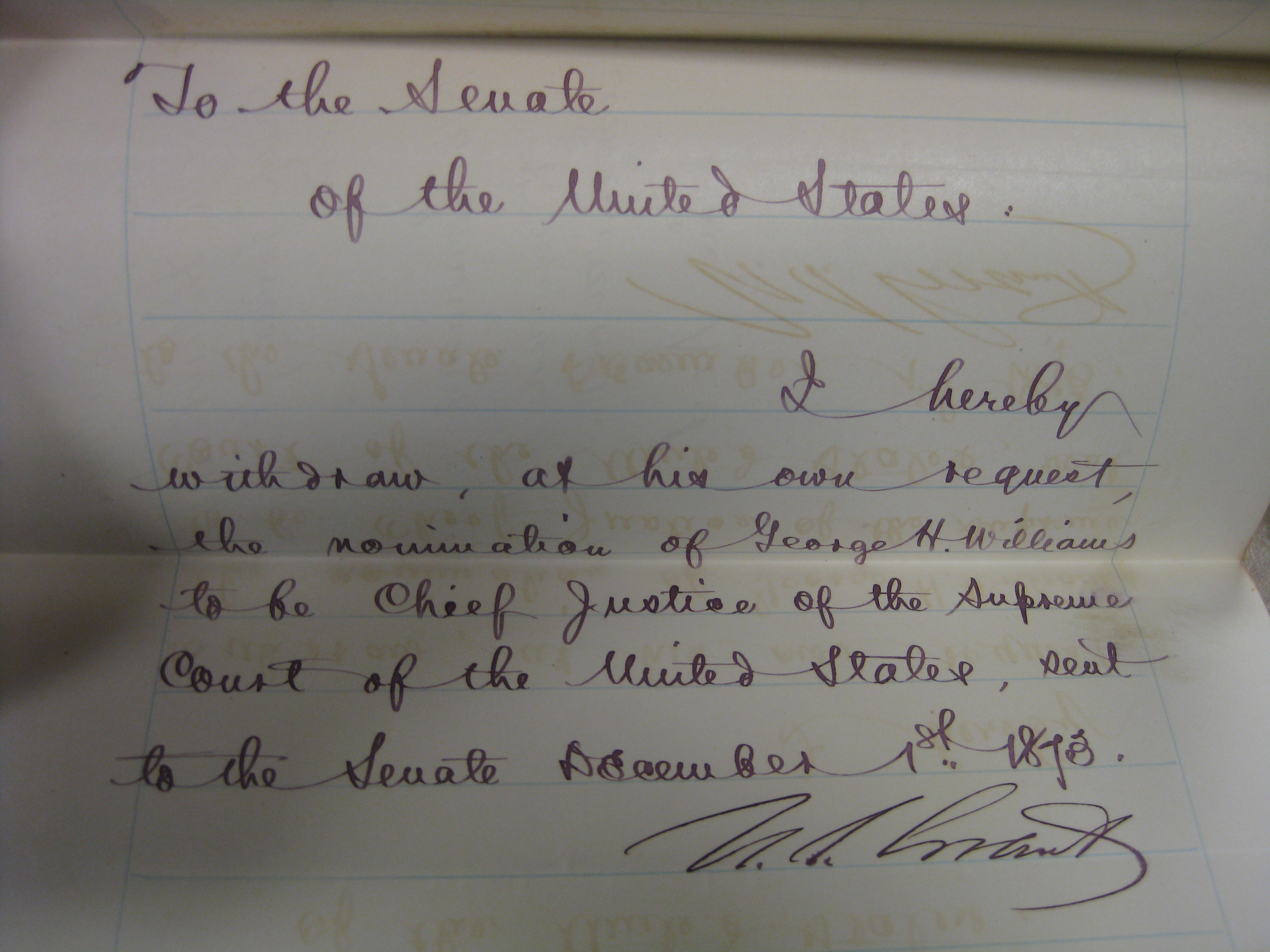
President Grant's withdrawal of Williams's chief justice nomination

In December 1873, President Grant nominated Williams to become Chief Justice of the United States Supreme Court. Initially, Grant had Senator Roscoe Conkling's support for the nomination. However, rumor spread through Washington that Williams had used Justice Department funds to pay for his wife's expensive carriage. Williams had drawn on Justice Department funds, replaced by himself, when banks suspended payment on checks during the Panic of 1873. Sen. Conkling believed under the circumstances the nomination should be revoked. In December 1873, after previously reporting the nomination to the Senate with a favorable recommendation, the Senate Judiciary Committee held two days of closed-door hearings concerning the controversy. This was the first recorded instance in which formal hearings are known to have been held on a Supreme Court nominee by a Senate committee. On January 9, 1874, an angered President Grant sent the Senate a letter that withdrew Williams's name from nomination.

=== Honored by New York Bar (1874) ===
On January 31, 1874, prominent members of the New York Bar and Bench attend a reception given by Col. Eliott F. Shepard in honor of U.S. Attorney General Williams. The extravagantly lighted party took place on No. 10 East 44 Street in New York from 8 pm to 10 pm. Williams had initially visited New York on vacation for a reunion with old friends. The Bernstein Band performed a series of popular musical opera arrangements. Prominent New York judges attended, including Justice Louis B. Woodruff and Justice Noah Davis. Almost 800 persons showed up in attendance including a future President, Collector of New York, Chester A. Arthur.

=== Resignation and corruption (1875) ===
President Grant forced Williams to resign in April 1875 upon a rumor in Washington, D.C., that Williams's wife had accepted $30,000 in payment in order for Williams to drop litigation against alleged fraudulent activities of a New York mercantile house Pratt & Boyd. Also under scrutiny was Williams’ wife's purchase using government money of an expensive carriage in Washington, which she had equipped with liveried coachman and footman. Williams had also commingled his personal accounts with those of the Justice Department, paying personal checks using government money, although he made repayment. One of Grant's reforming cabinet members Postmaster Marshall Jewell, informed Grant that Congress was planning a formal investigation into William's Justice Department. Senator Roscoe Conkling, Grant's ally in the U.S. Senate, had asked Grant that Att. Gen. Williams step down from office. William's resigned office, and Grant appointed reformer and famous New York lawyer Edwards Pierrepont for his replacement. Pierrepont made extensive investigations into the conduct of the U.S. Attorneys and U.S. Marshals in the Southern states, exposing fraud and corruption, and gave specific reform orders to that were vigorously enforced, cleaning up the Justice Department.

== Later career ==
In February 1876, Williams was part of a three-man defense team who defended Orville E. Babcock, President Grant's former private military secretary, at the Whiskey Ring trial held in St. Louis. Babcock had been charged with secretive collusion with the ring, and throwing off investigators. The investigation into the Whiskey Ring was started by Grant's Secretary of Treasury Benjamin H. Bristow to clean up Republican corruption. Babcock was acquitted.

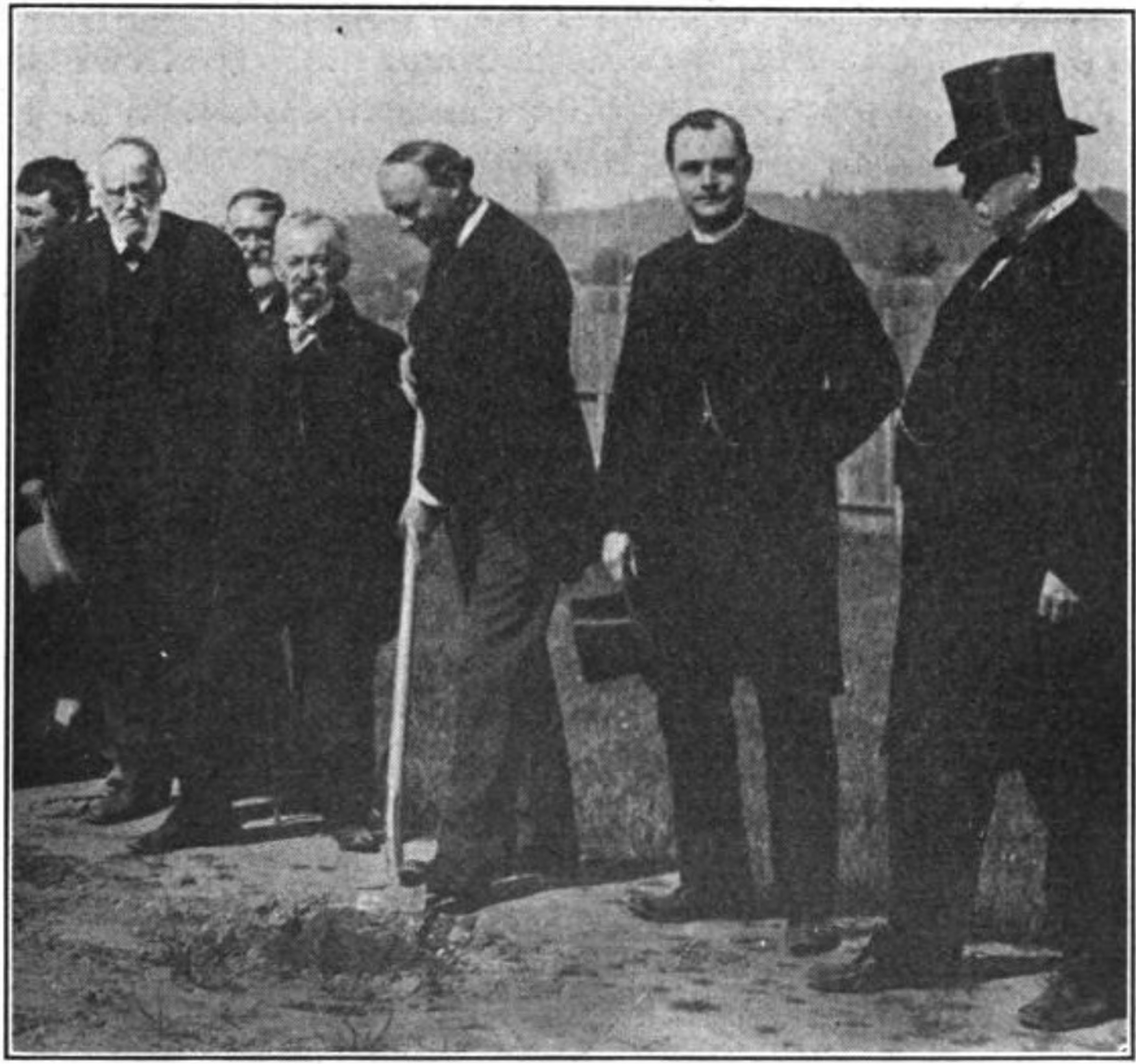
Mayor Williams at groundbreaking ceremony of the Lewis and Clark Centennial Exposition (1904). Williams is second from left holding hat in his right hand.

After resigning Williams declined an offer from Grant to become the U.S. minister to Spain. George Williams campaigned for the election of Rutherford B. Hayes as president in 1876. During the controversial presidential election of 1876, Williams, now a private citizen, went to Florida to manage the Hayes ballot returns.

After the 1876 U.S. presidential election, Williams returned to his Portland private law practice. Williams supported women's suffrage and the Oregon "popular government" movement.

In 1895, Williams published a compilation of Occasional Addresses gathered "from newspapers and stray places" that he had delivered as early as 1869, with the majority dating from 1885 to 1893. Intended primarily as a souvenir for friends, professional and political speeches were excluded. Among the 21 addresses presented are tributes delivered on the deaths of Generals U.S. Grant and W.T. Sherman and several prominent judges, and speeches bearing upon the history and growth of Portland, the study and practice of medicine, the militia, and the United States Supreme Court. Williams' address on the value of good thoughts was intended as advice to the 1891 graduating class of the high school at Portland.

On October 11, 1901, the Episcopal Church of America met in San Francisco to decide whether Episcopal clergymen could remarry divorced persons and discipline any Episcopal members who remarried. Former Attorney General Williams attended the meeting and opposed all restrictions by the Episcopal church on married and divorced persons and stated that such matters belonged in civil law as opposed to church law.

Williams was elected Portland's mayor serving from 1902 to 1905. On January 4, 1905, Mayor Williams, at the age of 83 years, was indicted by a grand jury in Multnomah County for allegedly refusing to enforce laws that regulated gambling . Williams was charged for not closing down gambling facilities on July 13, 1904, that operated within four miles of Portland. Portland's Chief of Police Charles H. Hunt's indictment was similar to Mayor Williams's indictment. Williams, however, was acquitted and served out the rest of his term in office.

On May 28, 1905, Mayor Williams gave a speech in honor of the opening of the Lewis and Clark Centennial Exposition. Vice President Charles W. Fairbanks was the keynote speaker who attended the opening ceremony. President Theodore Roosevelt officially mechanically opened the ceremony by pressing a button in Washington, D.C.

== Death and burial ==
Williams died April 4, 1910, in Portland and is buried at River View Cemetery in that city.

== Historical reputation ==
Williams was the first presidential cabinet member appointed from Oregon.

Although Williams had some successes as U.S. Attorney general, he was not a reformer and was involved in corruption during his tenure in federal office. Historian Jean Edward Smith, critical of Williams, said whenever "tested as attorney general he failed dismally."

== Marriages and family ==
Williams married Kate Van Antwerp in Iowa in 1850, and they had one daughter. He married a second time in 1867 to Kate Hughes George, and the couple adopted two children.

== See also ==
- George H. Williams Townhouses

== Sources ==
=== Books ===
- McFeely, William S. (1981). Grant: A Biography. Norton. ISBN 0-393-01372-3.
- Norris, L. David; Milligan, James C.; Faulk, Odie B. (1998). William H. Emory: Soldier-Scientist. The University of Arizona: The University of Arizona Press, The Arizona Board of Regents. ISBN 0-8165-1911-0.
- Smith, Jean Edward (2001). Grant. New York, New York: Simon & Schuster. ISBN 0-684-84927-5.
- White, Ronald C. (2016). American Ulysses: A Life of Ulysses S. Grant. Random House Publishing Group. ISBN 978-1-5883-6992-5.

=== External links ===
- "George Henry Williams". Yamhill County Circuit Court, Oregon Judicial Department. 2009.
- United States Congress. "George Henry Williams (id: W000498)". Biographical Directory of the United States Congress.

Legal offices
Preceded by Orville Pratt	Justice of the Oregon Supreme Court; 1853–1858	Succeeded by Aaron Waite
Preceded by Thomas Nelson	Chief Justice of the Oregon Supreme Court; 1853–1858	Succeeded by Aaron Waite
Preceded by Amos Akerman	United States Attorney General; 1871–1875	Succeeded by Edwards Pierrepont
U.S. Senate
Preceded by Benjamin Harding	U.S. Senator (Class 2) from Oregon; 1865–1871; Served alongside: James Nesmith, Henry Corbett	Succeeded by James Kelly
Political offices
Preceded by Henry Rowe	Mayor of Portland; 1902–1906	Succeeded by Harry Lane
