= William Brien =

William Brien may refer to:

- William Roy Brien (1930–1987), English footballer
- William W. Brien (born 1957), American physician and mayor of Beverly Hills, California
- William Brian, List of Philadelphia Eagles players

== See also ==
- William Bryan (disambiguation)
