= Charles Bryant =

Charles Bryant may refer to:

- Charles Bryant (actor) (1879–1948), British actor
- Charles David Jones Bryant (1883–1937), Australian artist
- Charles Ernest William Bryant (1902–1960), Australian barrister and ornithologist
- Charles Gyude Bryant (1949–2014), Liberian politician
- Charles G. Bryant (1803–1850), architect, soldier, adventurer, and American expansionist
- Charles W. Bryant, minister and constitutional convention delegate in Texas
- Charles W. "Chuck" Bryant (born 1971), American podcaster and co-host of Stuff You Should Know
