= John Bryant =

John or Jon Bryant may refer to:

== Academia and science ==
- John B. Bryant (1947–2020), American economist
- John Collins Bryant (1821–1901), American physician, author and college co-founder
- John Harland Bryant (1925–2017), American physician
- John Henry Bryant (politician) (1825–1903), American medical doctor and member of the Los Angeles Common Council
- John Henry Bryant (British physician) (1867–1906)

== Arts and entertainment ==
- John Delavau Bryant (1811–1877), American poet and physician
- John Bryant (harpist) (1832–1926), Welsh harpist
- John Bryant (journalist) (1943–2020), British journalist and marathon founder
- Jon Bryant (born 1986), Canadian singer-songwriter
- John Bryant (actor) (1916–1989) American actor of stage, film, and television

== Government and politics ==
- John Bryant (Oklahoma politician) (1957–2011), American politician
- John Emory Bryant (1836–1900), American politician in Georgia
- John Hope Bryant (born 1966), author, poverty eradication activist
- John R. Bryant, state legislator in North Carolina
- John Wiley Bryant (born 1947), American politician in Texas

== Sports ==
- John Bryant (basketball) (born 1987), American basketball player
- John Bryant (journalist) (1944–2020), British marathon founder
- John Bryant (sailor) (1930–2023), American Olympic sailor
- John Bryant (sport shooter) (1930–2010), Australian Olympic shooter
- John Bryant (rugby union) (born 2003), Australian rugby union player
- Jon Bryant (rugby union) (born 1976), Welsh rugby union player

== Others ==
- John A. Bryant, Australian businessman, former chairman and CEO of Kellogg Company
- John Richard Bryant (born 1943), bishop of the African Methodist Episcopal Church
- John W. Bryant (born 1949), leader of the Mormon fundamentalist sect Church of Christ Patriarchal
