= Edwin Bryant =

Edwin Bryant may refer to:

- Edwin Bryant (alcalde) (1805–1869), second alcalde of San Francisco, American newspaper editor and author of What I Saw in California
- Edwin Bryant (Indologist) (born 1957), American Indologist
- Edwin Bryant (cricketer) (1886–1948), English cricketer
- Edwin E. Bryant (1835–1903), American lawyer and politician

== See also ==
- Edward Bryant (1945–2017), American science fiction and horror writer
