= James Bryant =

James Bryant may refer to:

== Sports ==
- James Bryant (American football) (born 1985), American football full back
- James Bryant (Australian cricketer) (1826–1881), Australian cricketer
- James Bryant (South African cricketer), (born 1976), South African cricketer

== Other people ==
- James Bryant (journalist) (1869–after 1903), journalist and civil rights activist in Omaha, Nebraska
- James Fraser Bryant (1877–1945), lawyer, judge and political figure in Saskatchewan, Canada
- P. James Bryant, pastor of Wheat Street Baptist Church in Atlanta, Georgia
- Jimmy Bryant (1925–1980), American country music guitarist
- Jimmy Bryant (singer) (1929–2022), American singer, arranger and composer

== Other uses ==
- James Bryant House, Moore County, North Carolina, USA; an NRHP-listed building

== See also ==
- Bryant (surname)
- James Bryant Conant (1893–1978), American chemist
- Peter James Bryant, U.S. actor
