= Robert Bryant =

Robert Bryant or Rob Bryant may refer to:

- Clive Joseph Robin "Rob" Bryant (born 1947; later known as Uncle Rob Bryant), Aboriginal Australian elder, founding director of Bangarra Dance Theatre
- Robert Bryant (mathematician) (born 1953), American mathematician
- Robert G. Bryant, American professor of chemistry
- Robert Bryant (water polo) (born 1958), Australian former water polo player

== See also ==
- Bob Bryant (disambiguation)
- Bobby Bryant (disambiguation)
