= William Bryan =

William Bryan may refer to

- William Alanson Bryan (1875–1942), American zoologist, ornithologist, naturalist and museum director
- William C. Bryan (1852–1933), United States Army soldier and Medal of Honor recipient
- William E. Bryan Jr. (1921–2008), United States Air Force major general and flying ace
- William James Bryan (1876–1908), U.S. senator from Florida
- William Jennings Bryan (1860–1925), orator and three-time Democratic nominee for U.S. President
- William Jennings Bryan Jr. (1889–1978), his son, American lawyer and politician
- William Joel Bryan (1815–1903), Texas soldier and land owner, namesake of Bryan, Texas
- William Joseph Bryan (1926–1977), American hypnotist
- William Lowe Bryan (1860–1955), 10th president of Indiana University
- William Shepard Bryan (1827–1906), Maryland lawyer and judge
- William Shepard Bryan Jr. (1859–1914), his son, American attorney and political figure
- William Bryan (cricketer) (1856–1933), English cricketer
- William Bryan (North Carolina politician) (1725–1781), American militia general and politician
- Billy Bryan (born 1955), American football player
- Billy Bryan (baseball) (1938–2026), American former Major League Baseball catcher
- Billy Bryan (footballer) (6 September 1912 – 2 August 1944) was an English professional footballer
- William Bryan (died 1993), British murder victim, see murders of Anne Castle and William Bryan
- William "Roddie" Bryan (born 1969), American convicted for the murder of Ahmaud Arbery
- SS William J. Bryan, a Liberty ship

== See also ==
- Willie Bryan (born 1947), Irish Gaelic footballer
- William Brien (disambiguation)
- William O'Bryan (1778–1868), founder of the Bible Christians
- William Bryant (disambiguation)
