= Peter W. Bryant =

American politician

Peter W. Bryant (born October 18, 1853 - July 30, 1912) was a lawyer and judge in Tampa, Florida. He was African American.

Bryant graduated from Howard University. He served as a justice of the peace in Hillsborough County from 1877 until 1881. Bryant was one of many African American public officials and elected representatives in Tampa and Florida during that era. Henry Brumick, also African American, served on Tampa's city council from 1876 until 1877.

== See also ==
- Zacariah D. Greene lawyer from South Carolina who worked as a principal in Tampa and ran for office
- African American officeholders from the end of the Civil War until before 1900
- African-American officeholders (1900–1959)
