= Donald "Isa" Hamm Bryant =

American historian

Donald "Isa" Hamm Bryant (January 8, 1943 – 2007) was an artist, an author, a historian and activist in Florida and California. He founded the Florida Black Historical Research Project and worked to preserve the history of Black Seminoles.

Bryant was born January 8, 1943, to Florence and Charlie Long Bryant in Ybor City. He was raised by his aunt, Othella Hamm, in West Palm Beach. He married twice and had four sons.

In the 1990s he returned to West Palm Beach to care for his father, who taught him about his great-great-grandfather, a Seminole.

Bryant helped organize ceremonies at Riverbend Regional Park in Jupiter, Florida to commemorate the Battles of the Loxahatchee, where Florida's Trail of Tears began after the battle between 500 and 700 Seminoles and approximately 1,700 U.S. soldiers. He also helped write the book We R Florida about Seminole life in Palm Beach County.

He died in San Francisco after a heart attack at age 64.
