= Michael Bryant =

Michael Bryant is the name of:

- Michael Bryant (actor) (1928–2002), British stage and television actor
- Michael Bryant (cricketer) (born 1959), English cricketer
- Michael Bryant (politician) (born 1966), Canadian lawyer and former Attorney-General of Ontario
- Michael Bryant (soccer) (born 1995), American soccer player
- Mike Bryant (born 1960), English musician
- Michael Bryant or Alan Brennert (born 1954), American author, television producer and screenwriter
