= Bryant Township =

Bryant Township may refer to:

- Bryant Township, Graham County, Kansas
- Bryant Township, Fillmore County, Nebraska
- Bryant Township, Logan County, North Dakota
