= Bobby Lynn Bryant =

American boxer

Bobby Bryant
Personal information
- Born: Bobby Lynn Bryant; August 7, 1992 (age 33) Memphis, Tennessee, U.S.
- Height: 5 ft 11 in (180 cm)
- Weight: Light middleweight

Boxing career
- Reach: 75 in (191 cm)
- Stance: Orthodox

Boxing record
- Total fights: 16
- Wins: 16
- Win by KO: 9
- Losses: 0
- Draws: 0
- No contests: 0

Bobby Lynn Bryant (born August 7, 1992) is an American professional boxer.

== Amateur career ==
Bryant was born in Memphis, Tennessee. He had a record of 112-17 during his amateur career. He won a gold medal at the 2007 National Jr. Golden Gloves Championships and a silver at the 2008 National Jr. Golden Gloves Championships.

== Professional career ==
In June 2011, Bryant beat the veteran Marteze Logan by unanimous decision at the Civic Center in Rayne, Louisiana.
