= Henry Bryant (botanist) =

English botanist (1721–1799)

- Born: 1721; Norwich
- Died: 4 June 1799 (aged 77–78); Colby, Norfolk
- Scientific career
- Fields: Botany

Henry Bryant (1721 – 4 June 1799) was an English botanist.

== Life ==
Bryant was born in Norwich, and educated privately in Norwich and at St John's College, Cambridge, where he graduated B.A. in 1749, and proceeded M.A. in 1753. He entered the church, but took up botany about 1764, after the death of his wife. He is said to have been a man of great acuteness and attainments in mathematics. From Norwich he was presented to the vicarage of Langham, Norfolk in 1758, removing afterwards to Heydon, Norfolk, and thence to the rectory of Colby, Norfolk, where he died on 4 June 1799. He was a brother of Charles Bryant, author of Flora diætetica, &c., who died shortly before him.

== Works ==
- A particular Enquiry into the Cause of that Disease in Wheat commonly called Brand, Norwich, 1784, 8vo.
