= Dan Bryant =

Dan Bryant may refer to:

- Dan Bryant (minstrel) (1833–1875, stage name of Dan O'Neill), member of Bryant's Minstrels, an American blackface minstrel troupe
- Dan Bryant (mountaineer) (1905–1957, nickname of Leslie Vickery Bryant), New Zealand mountaineer
- Dan Bryant (singer), member of American heavy metal band Cacophony
