= Donald A. Bryant =

American bioscientist (1950–2024)

Donald A. Bryant (March 12, 1950 – August 28, 2024) was an American bioscientist. He was the Ernest Pollard Chair of Biotechnology at the Eberly College of Science Pennsylvania State University. He published numerous research publications which are widely cited. Bryant's significant contributions include elucidating the key mechanisms of bacterial photosynthesis and the physiology of chlorophototrophic microbes. His pioneering work provided deep insights into microbial light-harvesting systems and their ecological significance.

== Professional career ==
- Earned a bachelor's degree in chemistry with honors at the Massachusetts Institute of Technology (1972), earned doctoral degree in molecular biology UCLA (1977) studying the phycobiliproteins of cyanobacteria.
- Supported by a U.S. National Science Foundation/National Council for Scientific Research postdoctoral fellowship at the Pasteur Institute (1979)
- Supported by a Department of Energy postdoctoral research fellowship at Cornell University (1981)
- Joined the Penn State faculty in 1981, appointed the Ernest C. Pollard Professor of Biotechnology (1992)
- Adjunct research appointment at Montana State University ( 2009-2020)
- Visiting professor in the Singapore Centre on Environmental Life Sciences Engineering at Nanyang Technological University (2013 -2018)
- Published nearly 450 scientific papers, mentored 86 graduate students and 38 postdoctoral researchers

== Research ==
Bryant's research focused on understanding photosynthesis in two distinct groups of bacteria. Cyanobacteria produce oxygen as a photosynthetic byproduct. In contrast, he also researched green sulfur bacteria which are anaerobic and can survive only in the absence of oxygen.

Bryant authored the book, The Molecular Biology of Cyanobacteria (1994) which summarizes and analyzes the taxonomy, biochemistry, physiology, cellular differentiation and developmental biology of cyanobacteria, which was relatively understudied at the time.

== Awards ==
- Award for Basic Research from the American Society for Microbiology 2022
- Charles F. Kettering Award in Photosynthesis from the American Society of Plant Biologists 2020
- D.C. White Research and Mentoring Award from the American Society for Microbiology 2018
- Daniel R. Tershak Memorial Teaching Award from the Penn State Department of Biochemistry and Molecular Biology 2010
- Elected as a fellow of the American Academy of Microbiology 1995
- Elected as a fellow of the American Association for the Advancement of Science in 2011
- Elected member of the Board of Governors of the American Academy of Microbiology from 2012 - 2018
- Served on editorial boards for multiple journals including Journal of Bacteriology, Photosynthesis Research, Archives of Microbiology, Journal of Biological Chemistry and Frontiers of Microbiology,
