= David Bryant (cricketer) =

English cricketer (born 1950)

Personal information
- Full name: David John Bryant
- Born: 29 October 1950 (age 76); Wandsworth, Surrey, England
- Batting: Right-handed
- Bowling: Right-arm fast-medium

Domestic team information
- Years: Team
- 1970–1971: Oxford University

Career statistics
| Competition | First-class |
|---|---|
| Matches | 6 |
| Runs scored | 19 |
| Batting average | 6.33 |
| 100s/50s | –/– |
| Top score | 6* |
| Balls bowled | 624 |
| Wickets | 8 |
| Bowling average | 52.87 |
| 5 wickets in innings | – |
| 10 wickets in match | – |
| Best bowling | 3/40 |
| Catches/stumpings | 1/– |
- Source: Cricinfo, 11 January 2020

David John Bryant (born 29 October 1950) is an English former first-class cricketer.

== Biography ==
Bryant was born at Wandsworth on 29 October 1950, and later studied at Pembroke College, Oxford. While studying at Oxford, he played first-class cricket for Oxford University on six occasions in 1970 and 1971. A right-arm fast-medium bowler, he took 8 wickets at an average of 52.87, with best figures of 3 for 40. Batting, he scored 19 runs with a high score of 6 not out.
