= Henry Charles Bryant =

English painter

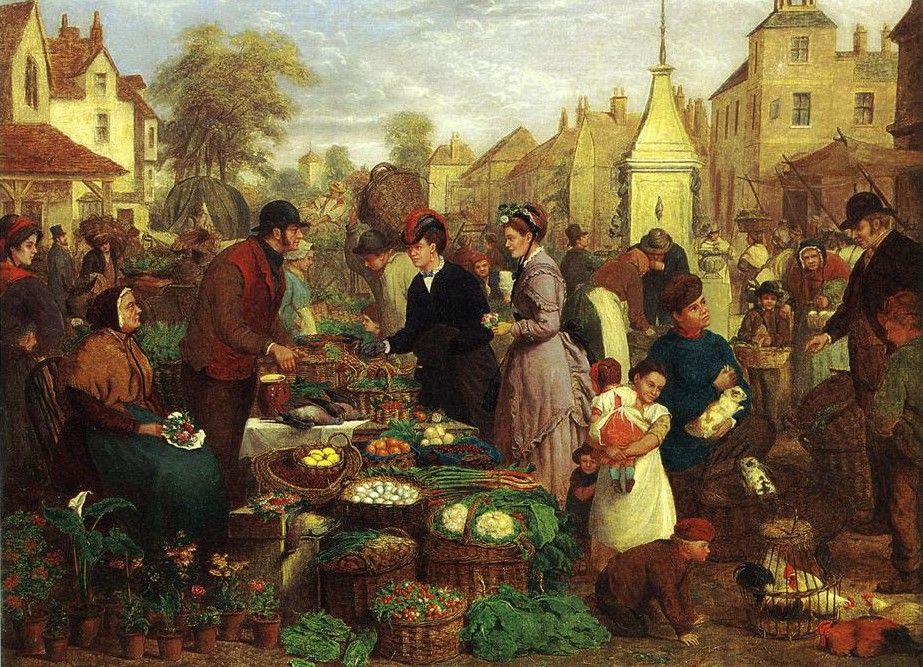
Market Day (1871)

Henry Charles Bryant (1835–1915) was an English portrait and landscapes painter known for his farmyard and market scenes which were noted for their great attention to detail. He worked mainly in London and Portsmouth and exhibited frequently between 1860 and 1880 at the Royal Academy, the British Institution and the Royal Society of British Artists. His paintings are highly sought after today.

Bryant died at 49, Derby Road, Portsmouth in January, 1915.
