= Castell V. Bryant =

American academic (1938–2026)

Castell Bryant
- Born: 1938
- Died: May 2, 2026 (aged 88)
- Education: Florida A&M University; Nova Southeastern University
- Occupation: Academic administrator

Castell Vaughn Bryant (1938 – May 2, 2026) was an American academic administrator who was the interim president of Florida A&M University between January 2005 and May 2007. She is the first woman to hold this position at the university.

The Board of Trustees, upon her appointment, voted that Bryant would not be eligible to apply for or hold the permanent post of President of the university. R. B. Holmes, Co-chairman of the Presidential Search Committee, announced that he'd hoped that a new permanent president would be appointed by the end of 2006. Bryant resigned from her position as interim President of FAMU on Friday May 11, 2007. Larry Robinson served briefly as the university's Chief Operating Officer, until newly appointed President James H. Ammons assumed the post on July 2, 2007.

Bryant died on May 2, 2026, at the age of 88.
