= Benjamin Bryant =

Benjamin or Ben Bryant may refer to:

- Benjamin Franklin Bryant (1800–1857), Republic of Texas captain
- Benjamin Bryant (Royal Navy officer) (1905–1994), British admiral
- Benjamin Bryant (broadcaster) (born 1977), American writer, broadcaster, filmmaker, and civil servant
- Ben Bryant (cricketer) (born 1994), Australian cricketer
- Ben Bryant (American football) (born 1999), American football player
