= Bryant Pond (New York) =

- Interactive map of Bryant Pond
- Location: Putnam County, New York
- Coordinates: 41.3766568°N 73.8046713°W
- Type: Pond
- Basin countries: United States
- Surface area: 13 acres (5.3 ha)

Bryant Pond is a lake in Putnam County, in the U.S. state of New York. The pond has a surface area of 13 acres (5.3 ha).

Bryant Pond has the name of one Solomon Bryant.
