= Cyrus Bryant =

American educator

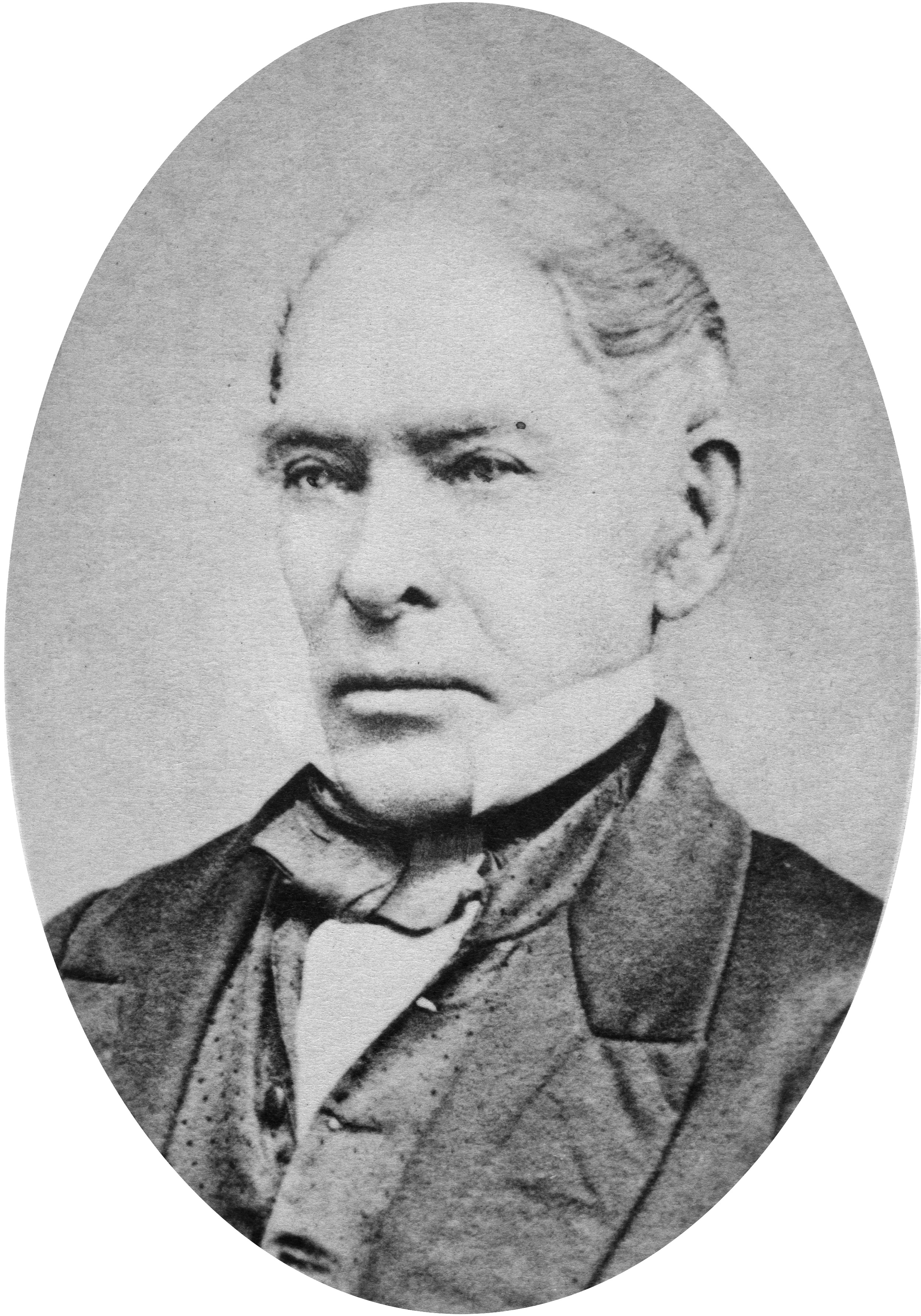
- Born: 12 July 1798; Cummington, Massachusetts, US
- Died: 19 February 1865 (aged 66); Princeton, Illinois, US

Cyrus Bryant (12 July 1798 – 19 February 1865) was an American educator and scientist and member of Academy of Natural Sciences in Philadelphia. He was brother of William Cullen Bryant and John Howard Bryant.

Cyrus was born in Cummington, Massachusetts as a son of Peter Bryant (1767–1820), a medical doctor and later a state legislator, and Sarah Snell. He had two sisters, Sarah Sneell Bryant (1802–1824), named after her mother, and a sister named Louisa Charity Bryant Olds (1808 - 1868) and four brothers:

- Austin (1793–1866)
- William Cullen (1794–1878)
- Peter Rush (1803–1883), later known as Arthur
- John Howard (1807–1902)

After finishing school, Cyrus was spending summers on a farm and lectured in winters. He then worked as a store clerk in South Carolina for four years. After returning to Cummington, Cyrus helped organize the local lyceum and spent a few years teaching chemistry and mineralogy. In 1832, together with his brother Arthur, Cyrus moved to Princeton, Illinois, where in 1834 he married Julia Everett (1808–1875). In Princeton, he resumed his past activities and served as county clerk and a teacher of chemistry and botany. He was noted for establishing the first library, printing press and agricultural exhibition in Princeton. He was also elected member of Academy of Natural Sciences in Philadelphia.
