= Mabel Bryant =

English field hockey player and cricketer (1883–1948)

Personal information
- Born: 1883 St Leonards-on-Sea, Sussex, England
- Died: 5 February 1948 (aged 64–65) Liverpool, Lancashire, England

Sport
- Country: United Kingdom
- Sport: Hockey, Cricket

Mabel Gladys Bryant (1883 – 5 February 1948) was an English field hockey and cricket player and umpire.

== Hockey ==
Bryant first played hockey for England at the age of 18 in 1901 and retired in 1930. Her 53 international matches was a record at the time. She continued to play hockey for Sussex and worked in the Liverpool Physical Training College. Bryant captained the England team in her later years including the tour of Australia in 1927.

== Cricket ==
On 28 August 1901, Bryant scored 224 not out for Visitors v Residents at Devonshire Park, Eastbourne. She scored the runs in two and a quarter hours out of a total of 367 for 5 wickets. Bryant also took five wickets in each innings of the match. It was the highest score in any class of women's cricket at the time.

Though more than 50 years of age, Bryant represented the first All England Women's Cricket team that played against the Rest at Leicester in 1933. When Australian women toured England for the first time in 1937, she appeared for the Lancashire Women against them. She stood as the umpire in the Second Test in Blackpool.

Bryant also excelled in tennis, lacrosse, fencing and swimming.
