= Bob Bryant =

Bob Bryant may refer to:

- Roscoe Rustling Bob Bryant (died 1878), American outlaw
- Bob Bryant (tackle) (1918–2000), American football player
- Bob Bryant (end) (1937–1999), American football player
- Bob Bryant (politician) (1944–2016), American politician
- Bob Bryant, stuntman and actor, was in Curse of the Faceless Man (1958)

== See also ==
- Robert Bryant (disambiguation)
- Bobby Bryant (disambiguation)
