= Edwin Bryant (cricketer) =

English cricketer (1886–1948)

Personal information
- Full name: Edwin Harvey Bryant
- Born: 12 September 1886; Bromsgrove, Worcestershire, England
- Died: 24 October 1948 (aged 62); Barnt Green, Worcestershire, England

Domestic team information
- Years: Team
- 1923–1925: Worcestershire

Career statistics
Competition	FC
Matches	16
Runs scored	329
Batting average	10.96
100s/50s	0/1
Top score	63
Balls bowled	0
Wickets	0
Bowling average	-
5 wickets in innings	0
10 wickets in match	0
Best bowling	-
Catches/stumpings	5/0
- Source: , 31 July 2008

Edwin Harvey Bryant (12 September 1886 – 24 October 1948) was an English cricketer who played 16 first-class games for Worcestershire in the 1920s. He top-scored with 41 in the second innings of his debut against Yorkshire, but his career was not successful.

Bryant made 63 in the first innings against Essex in June 1924, but this was to prove his only half-century. Indeed, his duck in the second innings of that match began a dreadful sequence of scores: he was dismissed for nought five times in six innings (making just 5 in the other), and for single figures in the four innings immediately thereafter. He played his last match against Nottinghamshire in June 1925; his final innings was another duck.
