= Marcus Bryant =

Marcus Bryant may refer to:

- Marcus Bryant (politician), American politician
- Marcus Bryant (American football) (born 2002), American football player
