= Mark Bryant (disambiguation) =

Mark Bryant (born 1965) is an American professional basketball player and coach.

Mark Bryant may also refer to:

- Mark Bryant (bishop) (born 1949), Church of England bishop
- Mark Bryant (cartoon historian) (born 1953), British historian of cartoons
- Mark Bryant (politician) (born 1956), American politician
- Mark Bryant (soccer) (fl. 1976–2004), American soccer defender
- Mark Bryant (rugby league) (born 1981), Australian rugby league footballer
