= William Bryant (physician) =

American physician

William Bryant (January 11, 1730 – c. 1783) was an American physician and antiquary.

Born to an industrious sea captain and his wife in Perth Amboy, New Jersey, William Bryant studied medicine and practiced in New York before relocating to Trenton in 1769. He became well-known as a successful physician and entered local intellectual circles, reading An Account of an Electrical Eel or Torpedo from Surinam before the American Philosophical Society in 1774. That same year, he was elected as a member of the Society.

During the Revolutionary War (1775–1783), Bryant treated both American and Hessian forces, and while living at Bloomsbury Court, found himself ousted by his neighbors for his Tory and Loyalist sympathies. After his expulsion, Bryant transferred his home to Colonel John Cox, and the property became a supply depot for the Continental Army.
