= Sarah Bryant =

Sarah or Sara Bryant may refer to:

- Sarah Bryant (British Army soldier) (née Feely, 1981–2008), British servicewoman who was killed in Afghanistan
- Sara Cone Bryant (1873–1956), American lecturer, teacher, writer
- Sarah Bryant (Virtua Fighter), character from the Virtua Fighter series
