= Oregon Supreme Court =

Highest court in the U.S. state of Oregon

- Seal of the Supreme Court
- Interactive map of Oregon Supreme Court
- 44.9375°N 123.0275°W
- Established: 1841
- Jurisdiction: Oregon
- Location: Salem, Oregon
- Coordinates: 44.9375°N 123.0275°W
- Composition method: Non-partisan statewide election
- Authorised by: Oregon Constitution Art. VII
- Appeals to: Supreme Court of the United States ((questions of federal law only)
- Judge term length: 6 years
- Number of positions: 7
- Website: Official website

Chief Justice
- Currently: Meagan Flynn
- Since: January 1, 2023
- Lead position ends: 2025
- Jurist term ends: 2027

The Oregon Supreme Court (OSC) is the highest state court in the U.S. state of Oregon. The only court that may reverse or modify a decision of the Oregon Supreme Court is the Supreme Court of the United States. The OSC holds court at the Oregon Supreme Court Building in Salem, Oregon, near the capitol building on State Street. The building was finished in 1914 and also houses the state's law library, while the courtroom is also used by the Oregon Court of Appeals.

Tracing its heritage to 1841 when Oregon pioneers selected a Supreme Judge with probate powers, the court has grown from a single judge to its current make up of seven justices. Justices of the court serve six-year terms upon election, however vacancies are filled by appointments of the Governor of Oregon until the next general election when any qualified candidate may run for the position, including the appointee. These seven justices then select one member to serve a six-year term as Chief Justice. The court's Chief Justice is not only responsible for assigning cases to the other justices to write the court's opinions, but is also the chief executive of the Oregon Judicial Department.

Primarily an appeals court, the Oregon Supreme Court is also the court of last resort in Oregon. Although most oral arguments before the court are held in the Oregon Supreme Court Building, the court does travel around the state holding sessions in various schools. All cases are heard en banc by the court. It receives appeals from the Oregon Tax Court, the Oregon Court of Appeals, and some select cases such as death penalty appeals. Decisions of the court are published in the Oregon Reporter published by the Oregon Judicial Department. The Territorial Supreme Court was created in 1848 when the Oregon Territory was formed out of the old Oregon Country region, followed by the creation of the State Supreme Court in 1859 when Oregon was admitted to the Union on February 14.

== Selection ==
The court is composed of seven elected justices, each of whom serves a six-year term after winning a nonpartisan election. Justices, like other Oregon state court judges, must be United States citizens, Oregon residents for at least three years, and lawyers admitted to practice in the state of Oregon. The newest justice receives the smallest office (nicknamed "the broom closet") and is responsible for opening the door when a conference is interrupted. When a state court judge retires, resigns, or dies before completing a term, the Governor may appoint another qualified person to the position. To retain that position, the appointed person must run for election for a full six-year term at the next general election.

On occasion, a judge will leave office at the end of a term, in which case a general election determines their replacement. If the Supreme Court needs an additional judge on a temporary basis due to illness, an unfilled position, or a justice is disqualified from sitting on a case due to a conflict of interest, the court can appoint a senior judge to serve as a judge pro tempore. Senior judges are all former, qualified judges (a minimum of 12 years on the bench) that have retired from a state court. Only former Supreme Court justices, elected Oregon circuit court judges, or elected Oregon Court of Appeals judges can be assigned to temporary service on the Supreme Court.

== Administrative ==
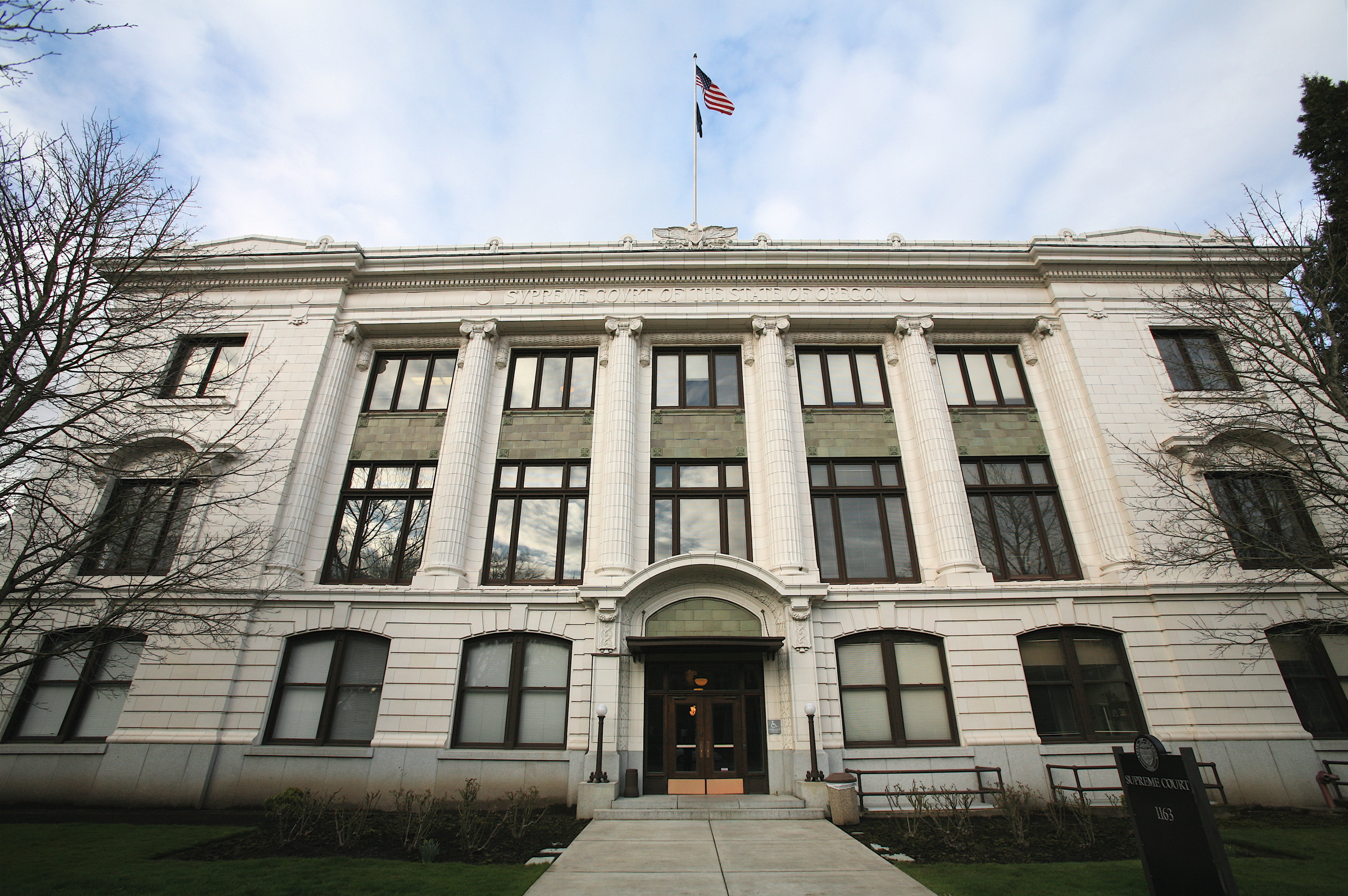
The Oregon Supreme Court

The court can appoint retired judges, lawyers, and other judges to serve temporarily as judges at any level in Oregon. They can also appoint senior judges to serve on any state court at or below the highest level of court that judge had served on before retirement or resignation. The state supreme court is responsible for admitting new lawyers to practice in Oregon, disciplining attorneys, and appointing members to the Board of Bar Examiners. This board of a minimum of fourteen members is responsible for administering the bar exam and screening prospective lawyers before admitting applicants to practice law in Oregon. Oversight of state judges is also in the hands of the Supreme Court. The Commission on Judicial Fitness and Disability investigates all reports of abuses and makes recommendations to the Supreme Court on any actions that may need to occur. The Supreme Court can then suspend judges, censure them, remove them from office, or take no action.

=== Chief justice ===
One justice of the court is elected by the court to serve a six-year term as chief justice. The chief justice is then responsible for all administration of the Supreme Court. Under a law enacted in 1981, the chief justice is not only the titular head of the Supreme Court but also the chief executive officer of the Oregon Judicial Department. In that role, the chief justice supervises all of the Oregon courts, appoints the chief judge of the Oregon Court of Appeals, assigns presiding judges for the trial level state courts, makes court rules, and is in charge of the department's budget. As administrator the chief justice is also the recipient of many reports from the court system including non-legal employees of the department. The first chief justice of the Oregon Supreme Court was William P. Bryant, while the longest serving chief was Wallace P. Carson, Jr. who held the position for 15 years.

=== Oregon Reports ===
Beginning in 1853, the official court reporter for the publication of all Supreme Court decisions was the Oregon Reports, abbreviated Or. or Ore. in case citations. These bound editions are published under the authority of the Oregon Supreme Court as authorized by state law.

Joseph G. Wilson started in 1853 as the clerk for the court and was responsible for the Oregon Reports until 1870, though he also served as a justice of the court from 1862 to 1870. Later federal judge Charles B. Bellinger then took over editing the reports, and served as clerk until 1880. He was followed by T. B. Odeneal, J. A. Stratton, and W. H. Holmes, until 1889 when a law was passed that included a provision that the chief justice take over this responsibility. This arrangement only lasted a few years, as in 1891 a new law allowed the court to hire an official reporter, with later chief justice George H. Burnett serving as the first official reporter.

The first reported opinion in the Oregon Reports was Thompson v. Backenstos, involving a case about trespassing. In the case, Justice George Henry Williams wrote the opinion, Justice Thomas Nelson had served as the judge at the trial level due to circuit riding, while future justice Reuben P. Boise served as counsel for the defense, and fellow future justice Aaron E. Waite provided counsel for the plaintiff.

== Powers and jurisdiction ==
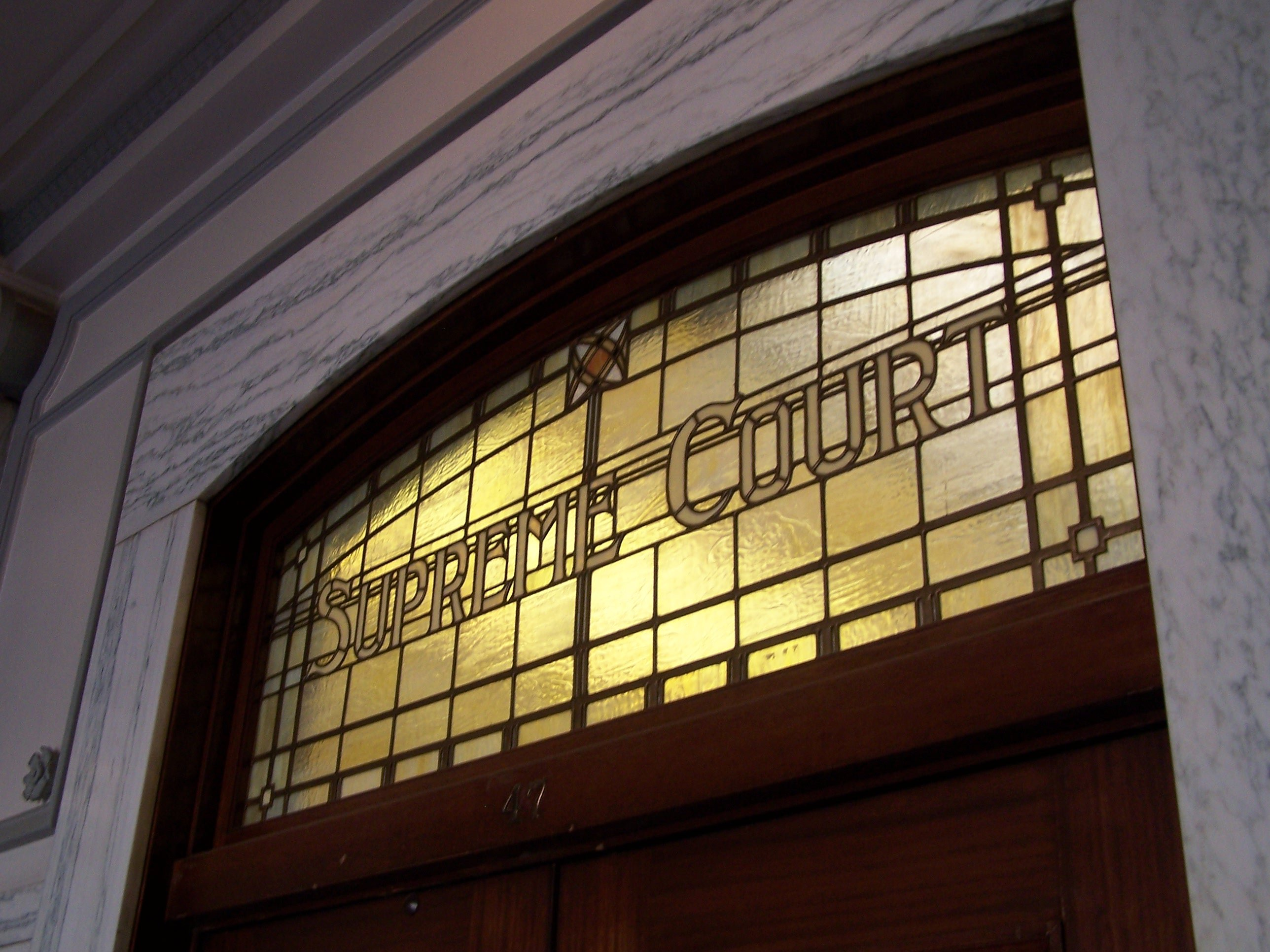
Stained glass above the courtroom entrance

The powers of the OSC derive from the Oregon Constitution's Article VII. Like other supreme courts in the United States, the Oregon Supreme Court acts primarily as a court of appeals. They choose cases that are of legal significance or to unify lower court decisions. In this aspect the court has discretionary review over many of the cases appealed to the high court. Discretionary review allows the court to choose which cases it will hear on appeal. With those cases that are denied an appeal to the Supreme Court, the decision of the lower court becomes final and binding. As of 1995, the court only accepted one in eight appeals that were discretionary. The justices meet once per week in a formal conference in which only the justices are involved to determine rulings. Once a case is accepted, the court hears the case en banc. That is the court is not divided into panels, and instead all justices participate in all the cases, unless a justice recuses themselves due to a conflict of interest or other concern.

The court also reviews death penalty cases, state tax court appeals, and items regarding legal discipline on direct review. Direct review means that the Supreme Court hears cases directly upon appeal without the case first going to the Court of Appeals. Other direct review items include state agency decisions such as the placement of prisons, placement of energy production facilities, locations of sites for solid waste disposal, and some labor law injunctions. Additionally, the court has original jurisdiction in, writs of mandamus, writs quo warranto, writs of habeas corpus, reapportionment of state legislative districts, and challenges to ballot measures such as their titles, the fiscal impact statement, and the explanatory statement as listed in the Voter's Pamphlet.

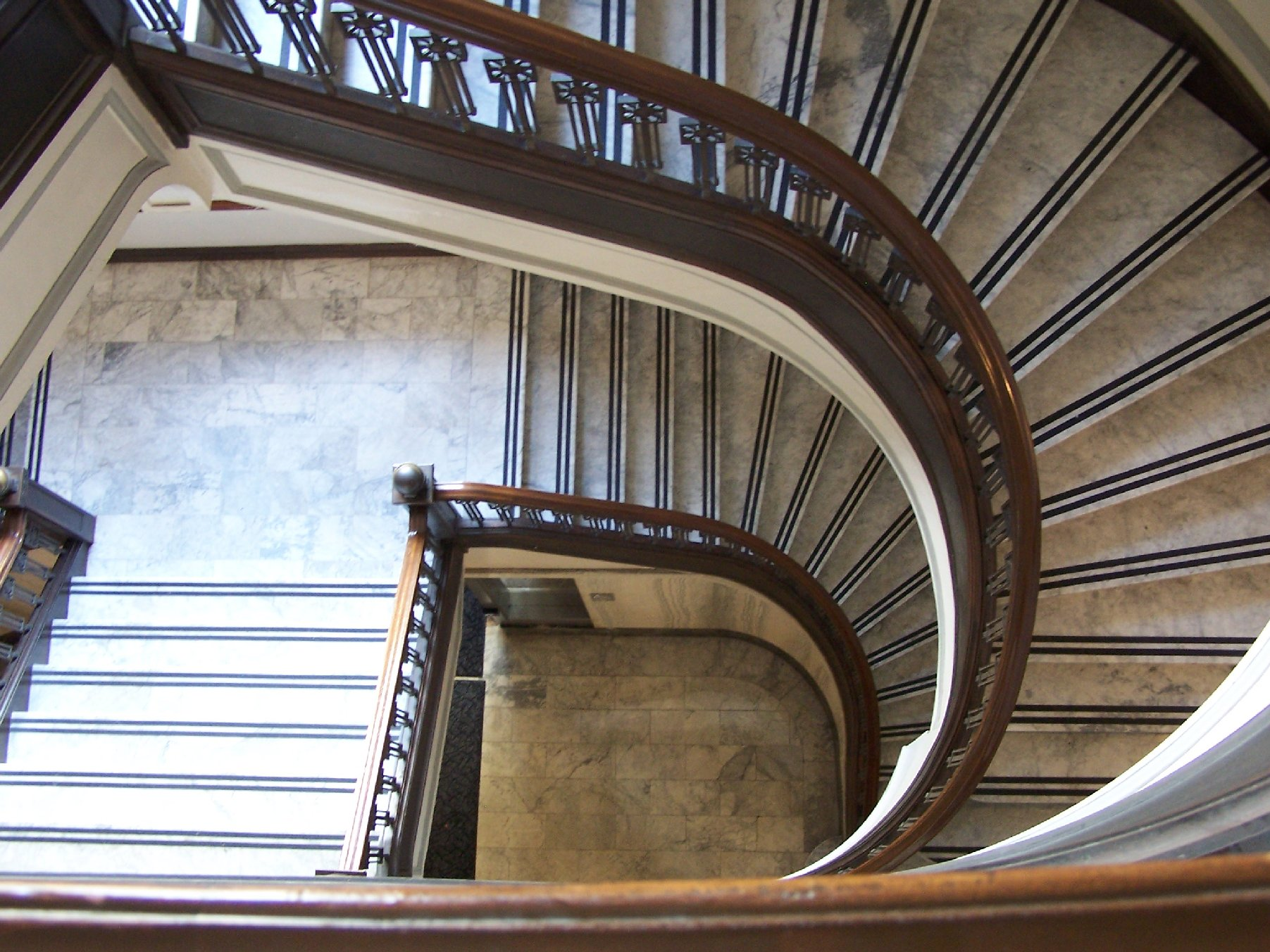
The main stairs of the Supreme Court Building

Oregon's state courts are courts of general jurisdiction, unlike federal courts. That is, the state courts can hear all cases regardless of whether the dispute is based on state law, federal law, or a combination of both, with a few exceptions. Thus the Oregon Supreme Court can hear appeals for cases based on both federal and state law. Although the U.S. Supreme Court is the only court that can overturn decisions of the Oregon court, Oregon Supreme Court decisions as to federal law are only binding on other Oregon state level courts. Federal courts are not required to follow the decisions of the Oregon Supreme Court for decisions based on federal law, regardless as to if the federal court is located within the state. However, federal courts are bound to follow Oregon law and decisions of the Oregon Supreme Court for cases that involve disputes based on Oregon law, even when those federal courts are not based in Oregon, per the Erie Doctrine developed by the U.S. Supreme Court. For this reason federal courts, and courts from other states, can certify questions about Oregon law to the Oregon Supreme Court in order to clarify what the law in Oregon is in regards to the specific fact pattern that the federal court has before it in their case (see ORS 28.200 to 28.255 and ORAP 12.20).

Although only the United States Supreme Court can overturn the decisions of the Oregon Supreme Court, they cannot overturn decisions exclusively based on the Oregon law, though other mechanisms exist that effectively overturn decisions of the Oregon Supreme Court. The U.S. Supreme Court can only accept cases from the Oregon Supreme Court if the decision involves issues of federal law and interpretation of federal law might change the outcome of the case. The Oregon Supreme Court is the final authority on Oregon law, and absent extraordinary circumstances the U.S. Supreme Court cannot overrule its interpretation of Oregon law (see adequate and independent state ground). Although only the U.S. Supreme Court can reverse or overturn decisions of the Oregon Supreme Court, decisions of the court can be effectively overturned by changing the law. Thus later outcomes of the court can be affected by legislation passed by the Oregon Legislative Assembly or through the initiative and referendum process. Also, in most criminal decisions Oregon's Governor may issue a pardon (some crimes require the Oregon Legislature to concur).

== History ==
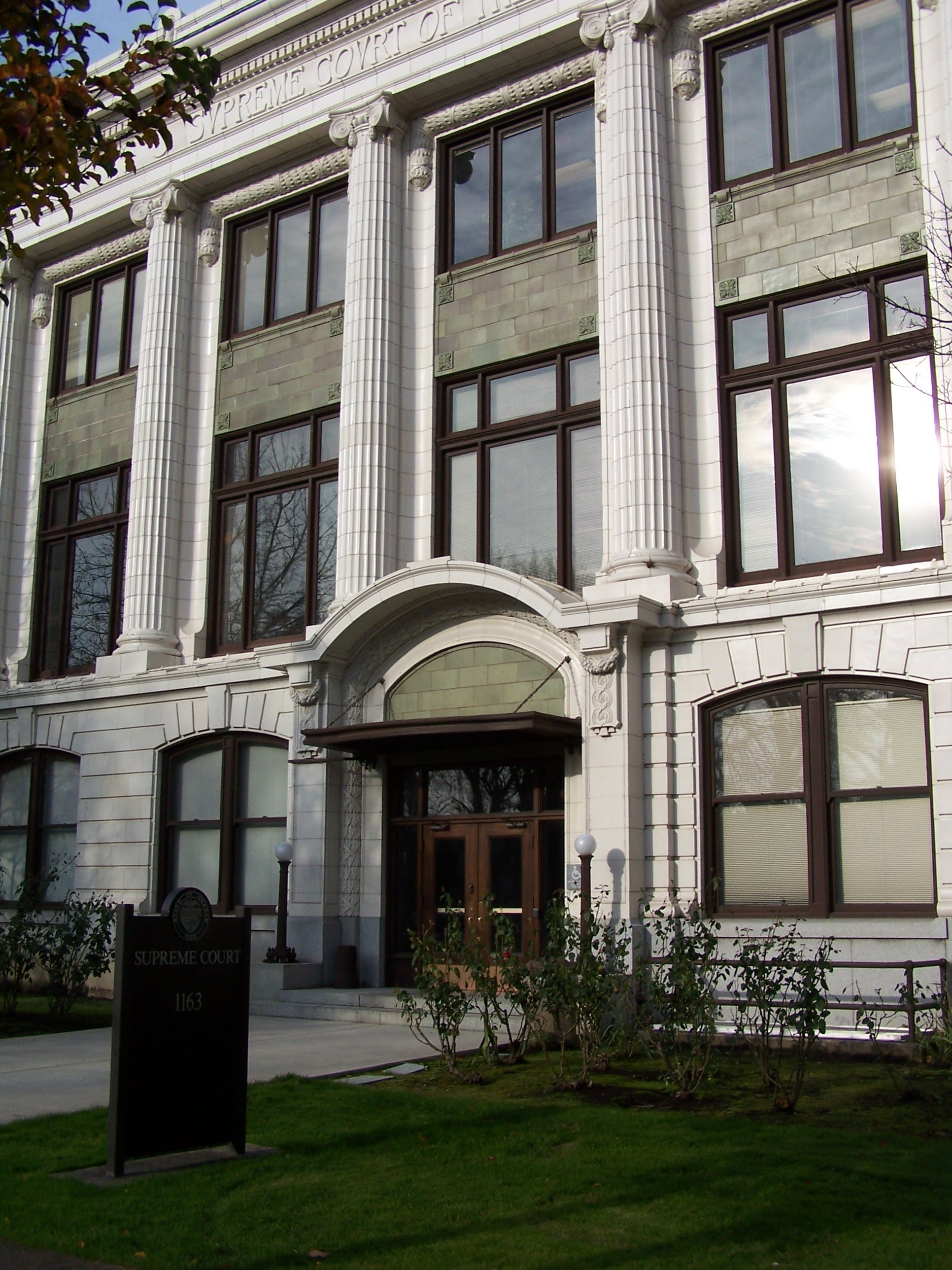
The court's main entrance

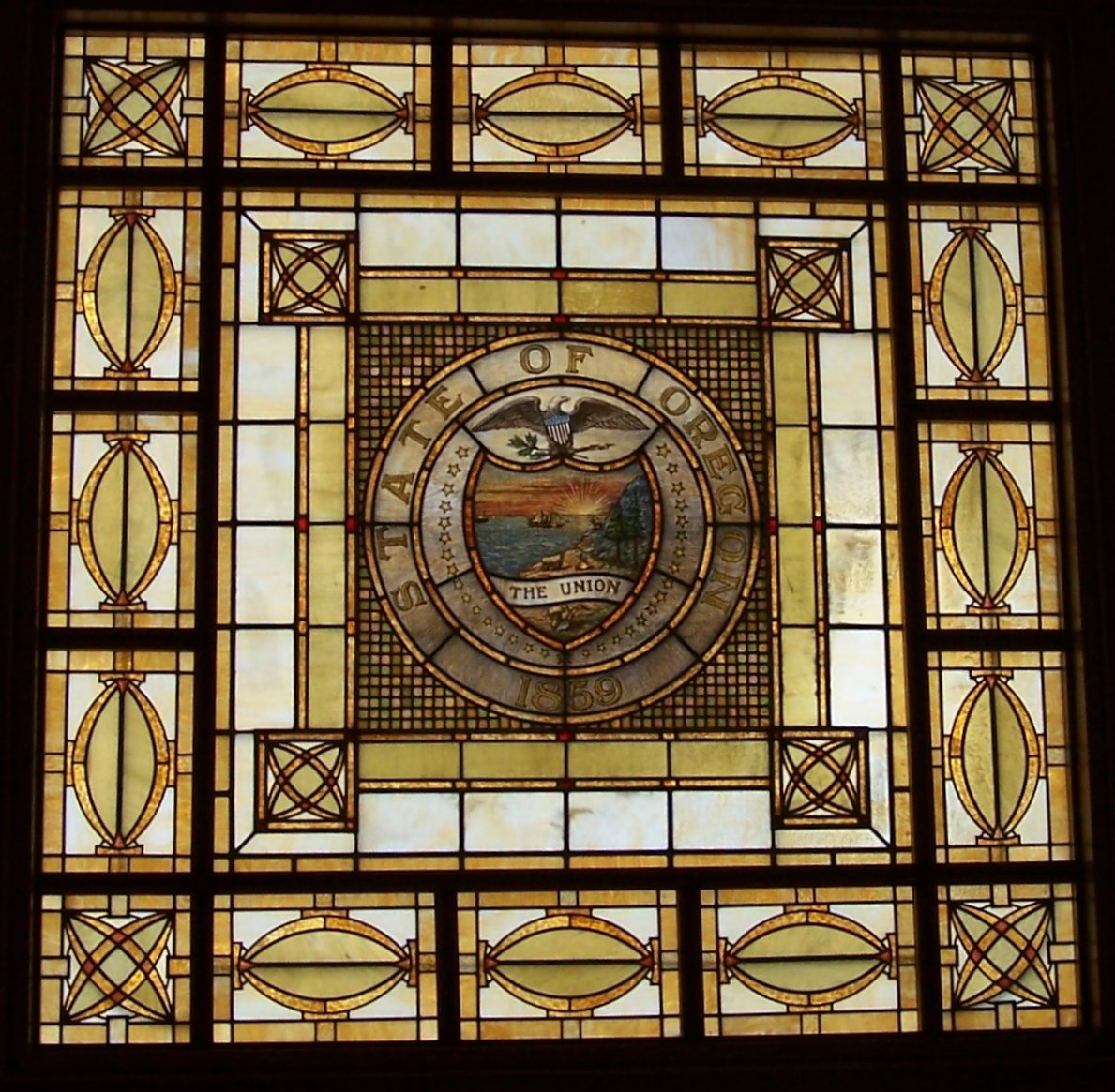
Stained glass ceiling of the courtroom

Following the journey of the Lewis and Clark Expedition in 1805, the region known as Oregon Country experienced increased activity and exploration by Europeans and Americans. Beginning with the fur trade, settlement by Euro-Americans began as early as 1811 with the founding of Fort Astoria and slowly increased until the 1830s. In the 1830s additional settlement occurred, agricultural production increased, and missionaries started religious missions in the region. In 1835, the first trial in the region was held with John Kirk Townsend presiding as magistrate over a murder charge. Pioneer settlers continued to immigrate to the region, with larger wagon trains crossing the Oregon Trail in the 1840s bringing more immigrants and a need for courts.

=== Pre-statehood ===
The Oregon Supreme Court traces its roots back to the early settlement period of Oregon Country. In 1841, pioneer Ewing Young died without an heir or will in the unorganized lands of what are now the states of Idaho, Washington, and Oregon. In February of that year, settlers met at Champoeg to discuss the creation of a government, including a judiciary to deal with the execution of Young's estate. Although the overall government plans fell through, the group of pioneers and mountain men did elect a Supreme Judge to exercise probate powers. The first judge was Dr. Ira L. Babcock, serving from February 18, 1841, to May 1, 1843.

In 1843, a later set of meetings at Champoeg created the Provisional Government of Oregon with a judiciary consisting of a Supreme Judge and two justices of the peace for trial level courts. Albert E. Wilson was the first judge chosen as the Supreme Judge under this new government, but never served. Other judges were appointed or elected during this pre-territory period over the next six years. Until 1846 with the settlement of the Oregon boundary dispute, the region was not under the jurisdiction of any foreign power. With the resolution of the boundary issue, Britain retained the territory north of the 49th degree of latitude, with the United States taking the land south to the border of Mexican control California.

In 1848, when the Oregon Territory was created by the United States Congress, William P. Bryant was appointed as the first judge of the Oregon Supreme Court. Justices in the territorial period were appointed by the President of the United States. In those early days of the court, the justices would "ride circuit" in addition to their appellate court functions. Riding circuit involved acting as appeals court judges around the state in addition to the supreme court functions of ultimate appeal, a common practice in early American courts.

=== Oregon State Supreme Court ===
Beginning with statehood in 1859, the court had just four justices, one for each judicial district in the state. The constitution created by the Oregon Constitutional Convention in 1857 called for these justices to serve as both circuit court judges and supreme court justices. This was set to remain until the population of the state reached 100,000 people. Each justice was assigned one district, and then all justices would gather at set intervals to confer on appeals, which would occur at least once per year and were authorized to meet more frequently if needed. On appeals, the justice who presided over the lower court case would not participate in the proceedings.

Then in 1862 the court was expanded to five justices with the addition of a fifth judicial district. Also that year the Court hired its first clerk after the legislature authorized that position. In 1878, the legislature passed an act to separate the circuit and supreme courts after the population reached 100,000. With the creation of a separate Circuit Court and Supreme Court, riding circuit was abandoned and the Supreme Court was reduced to three members, with members of each court elected separately. Governor Thayer then appointed James K. Kelly, Reuben P. Boise, and Paine Page Prim to the court as temporary justices until elections could be held. During these early years of the court the selection of the Chief Justice was governed by the Oregon Constitution, with the senior justice or the justice with their term was next to expire was designated as the Chief Justice. This meant that a new chief would be selected at least every two years, and in general meant someone elected would serve their first four years on the bench as an associate justice and the last two years as the Chief Justice.

Mary Leonard became the first woman admitted to the state bar on April 13, 1886, when the court admitted her after a year-long battle that included the state legislature passing a new law to allow women to be admitted. In 1906, the Oregon court upheld a maximum hour law for women in State v. Muller, 48 Or. 252, 85 P. 855 (1906). Due partly to a brief by future U.S. Supreme Court justice Louis Brandeis, the U.S. Supreme Court upheld the Oregon law in Muller v. Oregon, 208 U.S. 412 (1908) despite ruling in 1905 in Lochner v. New York that a maximum hour law for bakers was unconstitutional. Then in 1910, the state legislature expanded the court back to five justices, and lastly, in 1913 the court expanded to the current seven justices.

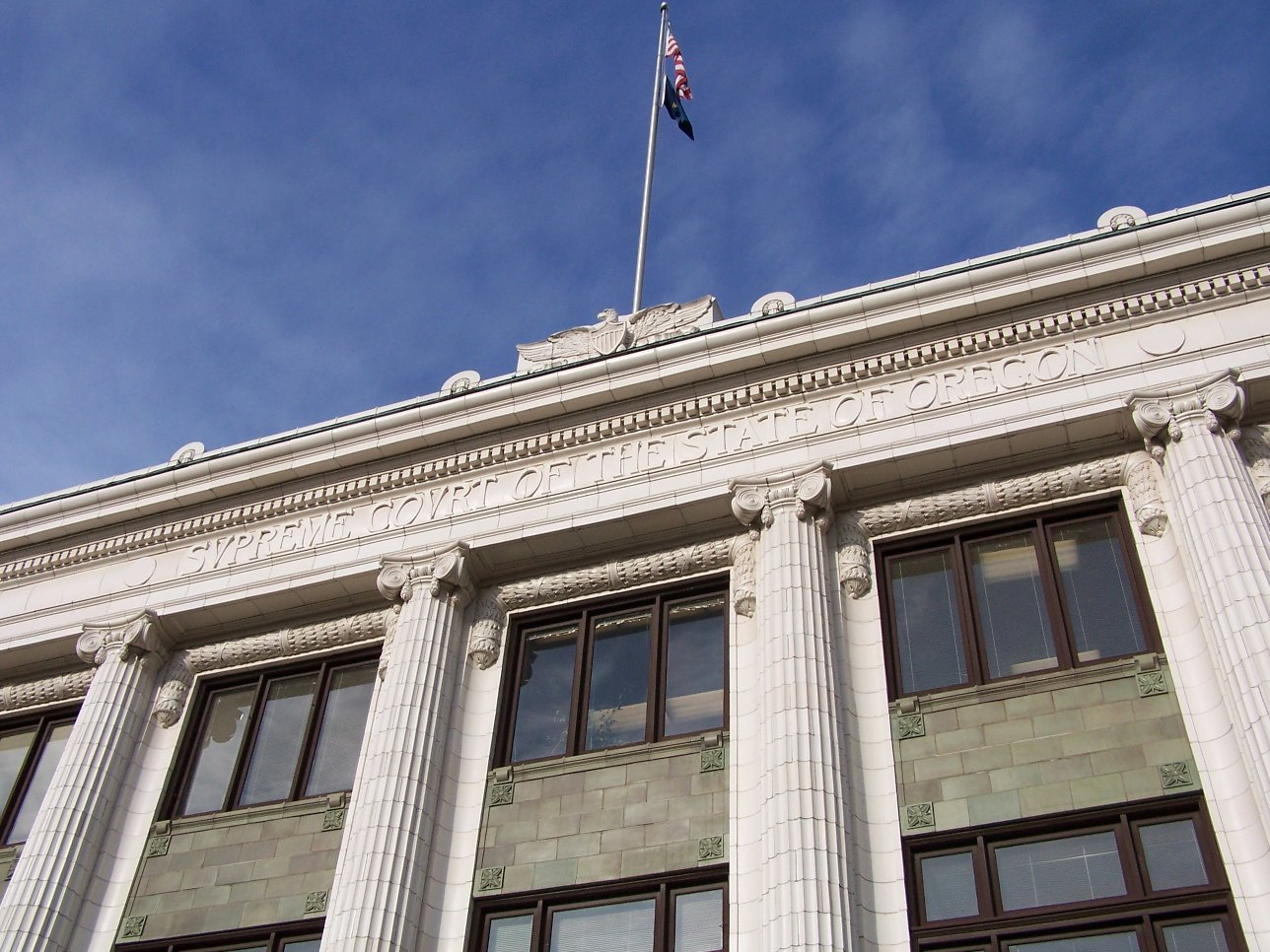
Exterior of Supreme Court Building

The next important case came in 1935 when the state's top court ruled in State v. De Jonge, 152 Or. 315, 51 P.2d 674 (1935) that the 14th Amendment did not protect Communist Party organizers from prosecution under Oregon's criminal syndicate law. However, the U.S. Supreme Court would overturn this decision in De Jonge v. Oregon, 299 U.S. 353 (1937). Another important case came in 1960 as the Oregon court ruled against the United States government in State Land Board v. United States, 222 Or. 40, 352 P.2d 539 (1960). In that case the court ruled that state estate laws trumped a federal statute concerning the property of U.S. Veterans who died at Veterans Administration hospitals without a valid will. The U.S. Supreme Court then overturned the Oregon Supreme Court's decision in United States v. Oregon, 366 U. S. 643 (1961).

On the administrative end of the court, the Oregon Court of Appeals was created in 1969 as an intermediate appellate court in Oregon. With this change, the Supreme Court now generally does not hear appeals directly from the trial level courts of the state, with some exceptions such as death penalty cases. Other changes came in 1981 when the Oregon Legislature and justice Arno Denecke reformed the chief justice position from a simple head of the court in title only, to the administrative head of the entire Oregon judicial system. The following year, 1982, the court received its first female member when Governor Vic Atiyeh appointed Betty Roberts as an associate justice. Then from 1991 to 2005 Wallace P. Carson, Jr. served as chief justice of the court for a record 14 years.

The next landmark decision of the U.S. Supreme Court involving the Oregon Supreme Court was Dolan v. City of Tigard, 512 U.S. 374 (1994). In that land use case the Oregon court found the requirements placed on the business owner as conditions to approve an expansion were not a taking under the United States Constitution's takings clause. However, the U.S. Supreme Court disagreed and overturned the Oregon court. Then the Oregon court ruled in February 2006 that Oregon's land use law, Measure 37, was constitutional. Macpherson v. Department of Administrative Services, 340 Or. 117, 130 P.3d 308 (2006) allowed people to make claims against the government forcing the government to either pay compensation when land use regulations reduced the value of a property owners land or waive the regulation.

=== Location ===
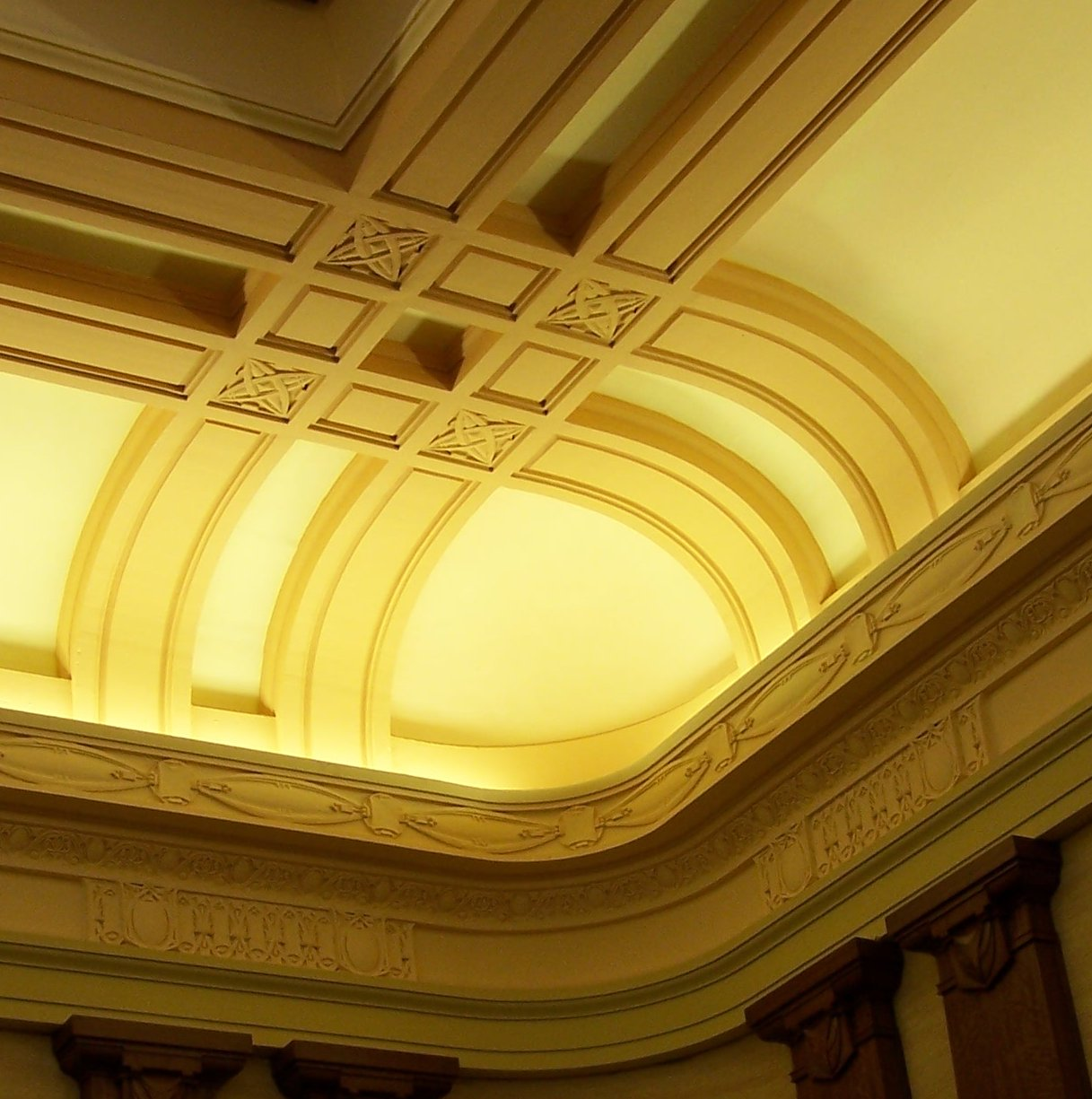
Ornamental interior of the courtroom

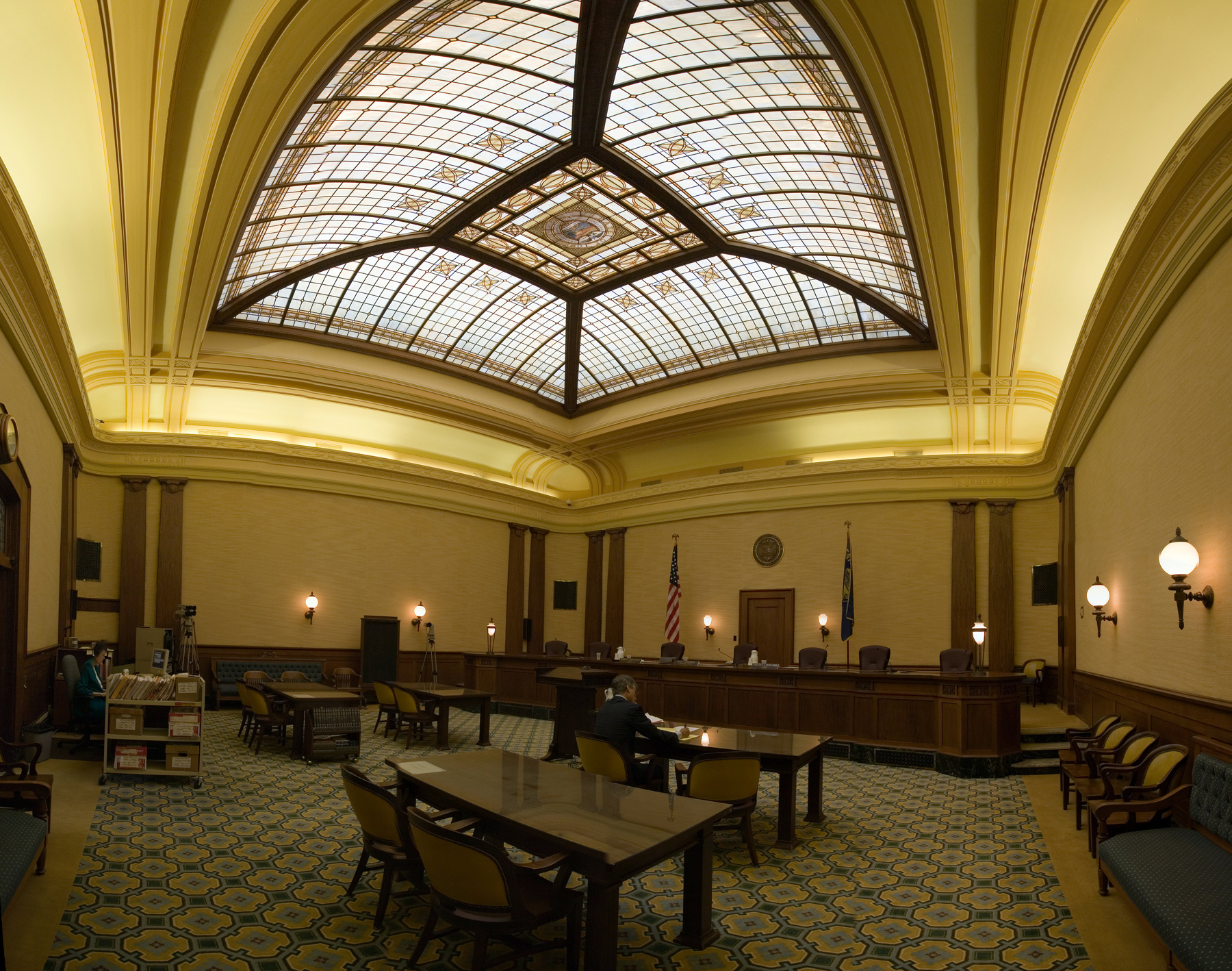
Oregon Supreme Court's courtroom.

In the early years of the Supreme Court, business was conducted at a variety of locations in downtown Salem. The first public building to house the court was the Territorial Capitol Building in Salem that was built between 1854 and 1855. In that building the courtroom was in a chamber measuring 20 by 27 feet (6.1 by 8.2 m) on the first floor. On December 29, 1855, after the building was partially occupied, it burned to the ground. In 1876, the state finished construction on a second capitol building where the court was located on the third floor. This courtroom measured 54 by 46 feet (16 by 14 m), while the state law library was 75 by 70 feet (23 by 21 m). A separate building was built by the state in 1914 to house the Supreme Court, and this is now the oldest building on the Capitol Mall after the second capitol building burned down on April 25, 1935.

In addition to holding court in the Supreme Court Building's third floor courtroom, the court also travels around the state to hold sessions. This includes sessions at colleges, high schools, and the state's three law schools. These three law schools, Willamette University College of Law, University of Oregon Law School, and Lewis & Clark Law School, use the visits as educational tools.

== Current justices ==
The court has had a total of 106 individuals serve on the court since its creation during the territorial period. This has ranged from a membership of three justices to seven justices. Since 1913, the number of positions on the bench has been seven. Of the current membership, three are women and four are men. Overall, the court has had ten women compared to ninety-seven men serve on the court.

The newest members of the court are Stephen Bushong, Bronson James and Aruna Masih, who joined in 2023. All of the seven current justices first joined the court as appointees of the governor of Oregon to fill mid-term vacancies.

| Name | Born | Start | Chief term | Term ends | Mandatory retirement | Appointer | Law school |
|---|---|---|---|---|---|---|---|
| Meagan Flynn, Chief Justice | July 28, 1967 (age 59) | April 1, 2017 | 2023–present | January 6, 2031 | 2042 | Kate Brown (D) | Gonzaga |
| Rebecca Duncan | 1971 (age 54–55) | July 1, 2017 | – | January 6, 2031 | 2046 | Kate Brown (D) | Michigan |
| Christopher L. Garrett | December 26, 1973 (age 52) | January 1, 2019 | – | January 3, 2033 | 2048 | Kate Brown (D) | Chicago |
| Roger DeHoog | May 16, 1965 (age 61) | January 19, 2022 | – | January 1, 2029 | 2040 | Kate Brown (D) | Oregon |
| Stephen Bushong | October 11, 1958 (age 68) | January 1, 2023 | – | January 6, 2031 | 2033 | Kate Brown (D) | Michigan |
| Bronson James | 1972 (age 53–54) | January 1, 2023 | – | January 6, 2031 | 2047 | Kate Brown (D) | Lewis and Clark |
| Aruna Masih | July 9, 1971 (age 55) | September 1, 2023 | – | January 6, 2031 | 2046 | Tina Kotek (D) | Creighton |

== Notable Supreme Court cases ==
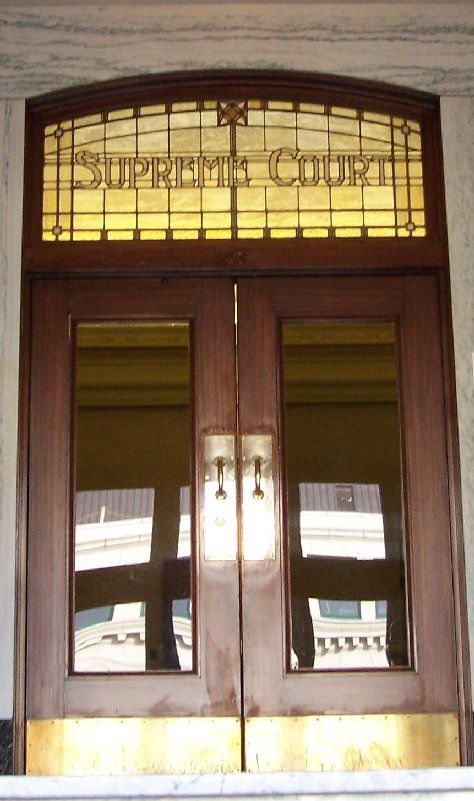
Entrance to the courtroom.

Over the course of its history the Oregon Supreme Court has made a number of decisions as the highest court in Oregon. These cases cover a wide range of topics from the constitutionality of various ballot measures to contract law to torts and even to the location of the capital when Oregon was still a territory. Although small in comparison to the total number of cases the court has decided, some cases have been appealed to the United States Supreme Court. Below are some of the cases that have had scholarly discussion, some of which were later decided by the U.S. Supreme Court.

| Name | Year | Citations | Legal issue |
|---|---|---|---|
| Amos M. Short v. Francis Ermatinger | 1851 | N/A | location of the capital of Oregon Territory, constitutional construction |
| McLaughlin v. Hoover | 1853 | 1 Or. 31 | assumpsit, statute of limitations, repugnancy |
| Danielson v. Roberts | 1904 | 44 Or. 108, 74 P. 913 | property law |
| Oregon v. Pacific States Telephone & Telegraph Co. | 1909 | 53 Or. 162, 99 P. 427 | constitutionality of the initiative process |
| State v. Bunting | 1914 | 71 Or. 259, 139 P. 731 | labor law |
| Jackson v. Steinberg | 1948 | 186 Or. 129, 200 P.2d 376 | property law |
| McCallum v. Asbury | 1964 | 238 Or. 257, 393 P.2d 774 | partnership |
| Goodman v. Ladd Estate Co. | 1967 | 246 Or. 621, 427 P.2d 102 | corporation, Ultra vires |
| Lowe v. City of Eugene | 1969 | 254 Or. 518, 463 P.2d 360 | 1st Amendment, Skinner Butte |
| Petersen v. Thompson | 1973 | 264 Or. 516, 506 P.2d 697 | contract law |
| State v. Haas | 1973 | 267 Or. 489, 517 P.2d 671 | interrogation evidence |
| Ruble Forest Products, Inc. v. Lancer Mobile Homes of Oregon | 1974 | 269 Or. 315, 524 P.2d 1204 | contract law |
| Phillips v. Kimwood Machine Company | 1974 | 269 Or. 485, 525 P.2d 1033 | torts, product liability |
| Gustafson v. Payless Drug Stores NW, Inc. | 1974 | 269 Or. 354, 525 P.2d 118 | torts, Malice |
| State v. Lakeside | 1977 | 277 Ore. 569, 561 P.2d 612 | jury instructions, right against self incrimination when defendant does not testify |
| Southworth v. Oliver | 1978 | 284 Or. 361, 587 P.2d 994 | contract law |
| State v. Henry | 1987 | 302 Or. 510, 732 P2d 9 | State obscenity law held to be a violation of the First Amendment, the only time a U.S. state supreme court has so held. |
| Fazzolari v. Portland School District No. 1J | 1988 | 303 Or. 1, 734 P.2d 1326 | torts: negligence |
| Smith v. Employment Div. | 1988 | 307 Or. 68, 763 P.2d 146 | employment law, constitutional law |
| State v. Dixson | 1988 | 307 Or. 195, 763 P.2d 1015 | Oregon is first of six states to hold federal open-fields doctrine allowing warrantless searches of lands outside curtilage does not apply to state prosecutions where lands were posted, fenced or gated due to stronger language in state constitution and case law. |
| State v. Carlson | 1991 | 311 Or. 201, 808 P.2d 1002 | evidence, adoptive admission by silence |
| PGE v. Bureau of Labor and Industries | 1993 | 317 Or. 606, 859 P.2d 1143 | state family leave law, statutory interpretation |
| Conway v. Pacific University | 1996 | 324 Or. 231, 924 P.2d 818 | negligent misrepresentations |
| Stovall v. State By and Through Oregon Dept. of Transp. | 1996 | 324 Or. 92, 922 P.2d 646 | taxation of PERS retirement benefits |
| Oregon v. Guzek | 2004 | 336 Or. 424, 86 P.3d 1106 | death penalty |
| Macpherson v. Department of Administrative Services | 2004 | 340 Or. 117, 130 P.3d 308 | land use, measure 37 |
| Philip Morris USA Inc. v. Williams | 2006 | 340 Or. 35, 127 P.3d 1165 | punitive damages, smoking |

== See also ==
- Holmes v. Ford
- United States District Court for the District of Oregon
