= Charles W. Bryant =

Charles W. Bryant was a minister and constitutional convention delegate in Texas.

Born in Kentucky, he was enslaved. He worked for the Freedmen's Bureau in Texas after the American Civil War. He was elected a delegate to the united 1868-1869 Texas Constitutional Convention. He represented Harris County, Texas at the convention.

== See also ==
- African American officeholders from the end of the Civil War until before 1900
