= John Delavau Bryant =

American poet (1811–1877)

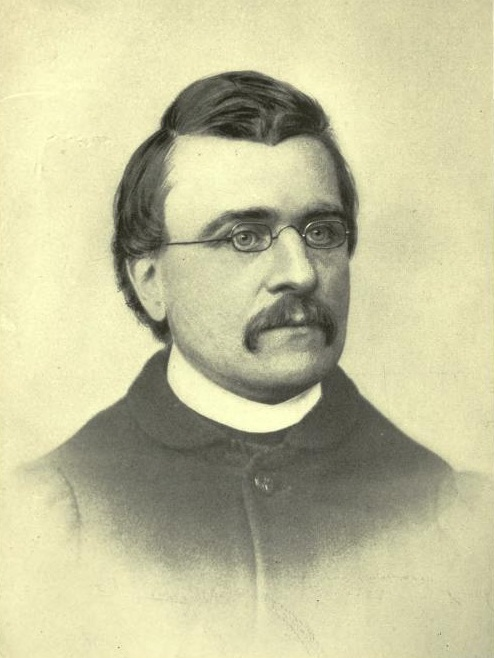
- Portrait of John Delavau Bryant
- Born: 1811; Philadelphia, Pennsylvania, U.S.
- Died: August 2, 1877 (aged 65–66)
- Occupations: Physician, poet, author, and editor

John Delavau Bryant (1811–1877) was an American medical doctor, poet, writer, and editor.

== Biography ==
He was born in 1811 in Philadelphia to Episcopalian minister, William Bryant. His mother was a daughter of John Delavau, a shipbuilder of Philadelphia.

His early education was under his father and in the Episcopalian Academy. He received the degree of A.B. in 1839, and A.M. in 1842 from the University of Pennsylvania, and entered the General Theological Seminary of the Protestant Episcopal Church in New York in 1839.

After one year he left the seminary to travel in Europe. On his return, he was received into the Catholic Church at St. John's Church, Philadelphia on February 12, 1842. He graduated in medicine at the University of Pennsylvania in 1848.

In 1855, during the yellow fever epidemic in Portsmouth and Norfolk, Virginia, he volunteered for duty and returned only after the epidemic had subsided. In 1857, he married Mary Harriet Riston, daughter of George Riston. For two years in the early sixties, he was editor of the Catholic Herald.

== Works ==
His principal work, published in 1859 by subscription, is an epic poem entitled The Redemption, apparently inspired by a visit to Jerusalem. It is founded on the Bible and Catholic tradition.

He also published, about 1852, a controversial novel entitled Pauline Seward. This had considerable vogue at the time, especially among Catholics, and ran through ten editions. In 1855, he published The Immaculate Conception of the Blessed Virgin Mary, Mother of God, an exposition of the dogma recently promulgated.
