= Briand =

Briand is a surname, and may refer to:

- Anne Briand (born 1968), French athlete
- Aristide Briand (1862–1932), Prime Minister of France and Nobel Peace Prize winner
- Ben Briand (born 1980), Australian film director
- Bernard Briand (born 1974), French politician
- Françoise Briand (born 1951), deputy in the French National Assembly
- Jean-Olivier Briand (1715–1794), Roman Catholic bishop of Quebec
- Jimmy Briand (born 1985), French football player
- Ludwig Briand (born 1981), French actor
- Pascal Briand (born 1976), French speed skater
- Philippe Briand (born 1950), deputy in the French National Assembly
