= William P. Bryant =

American judge (1806–1860)

1st Chief Justice of the Oregon Supreme Court
- In office 1848–1850
- Preceded by: (none)
- Succeeded by: Thomas Nelson

1st Justice of the Oregon Supreme Court
- In office 1848–1850
- Nominated by: James K. Polk
- Preceded by: (none)
- Succeeded by: Thomas Nelson

Personal details
- Born: August 3, 1806 Mercer County, Kentucky, U.S.
- Died: October 10, 1860 (aged 54) Rockville, Indiana, U.S.

William P. Bryant (August 3, 1806 – October 10, 1860) was an American jurist from Kentucky. He served as the first chief justice of the Oregon Supreme Court in the Oregon Territory. United States President James K. Polk appointed Bryant, of Indiana, to the court once the Oregon Territory was established in 1848. In Indiana he served in both houses of the Indiana General Assembly and was a county judge. Bryant also fought in the Black Hawk War against Native Americans.

== Early life ==
Bryant was born on August 3, 1806, in Mercer County, Kentucky. He grew up there and left home at age 18 after his mother had died when he was young and could no longer tolerate his father's religious upbringing. In 1825, Bryant moved to Rockville, Indiana, where he would fight in the Black Hawk War and begin practicing law. After the war he served in the Indiana House of Representatives from 1831 to 1836, followed by serving in the Indiana State Senate from 1836 until 1839.

Bryant started a law practice in 1840 with General T. A. Howard, and later served as a circuit court judge for Rockville. After changing political party affiliations from Whig to Democrat, he was appointed by United States President James K. Polk to serve as chief justice of the three member Oregon Supreme Court. Bryant was appointed on August 14, 1848, the same day the new Oregon Territory was created. He migrated to the territory in 1849, arriving April 9.

== Oregon ==
While in Oregon, Bryant purchased an island and milling operation from George Abernethy in the Willamette River called Abernethy's Island. However, the island near Oregon City was previously claimed by Doctor John McLoughlin. Later this became an issue between McLoughlin and Samuel R. Thurston. Thurston had worked the Donation Land Claim Act in Congress to exclude McLoughlin's claim to Oregon City and the island.

=== Oregon Supreme Court ===
On August 14, 1848, Bryant was nominated by President Polk to be "chief justice of the supreme court of the United States for the Territory of Oregon" and was subsequently unanimously confirmed by the United States Senate. He held his first session of court on August 20, 1849, in Oregon City.

As the only federal judge in the territory, Bryant presided over the first criminal trial in what is now the state of Washington in 1849. At that time the Oregon Territory encompassed all of present states of Oregon, Washington, Idaho, and parts of Montana and Wyoming. On May 1, 1849, a group of roughly 100 Snoqualmie and Skewahamish tribesmen showed up at Fort Nisqually. Fort Nisqually at this time was a fur trading post of the Hudson's Bay Company. The Native Americans were not there to attack, but eventually an American named Leander Wallace was killed by the natives.

Following the murder, U.S. troops were deployed and demanded the tribes turn over the killers. Only after giving the tribe's chief 80 blankets did they turn over anyone. These six Snoqualmies were charged with murder and Justice Bryant began the trial on October 1, 1849, at Fort Steilacoom after a grand jury returned indictments for all six. The outcome was that two, Kussus and Quallalwowt, were convicted of the murder and sentenced to hanging on October 2. On October 3, the two were hanged by U.S. Marshal Joseph L. Meek. The total cost of the trial was $2,379.54, which included the cost of the 80 blankets. Former judge of the Provisional Government of Oregon and later justice on the Oregon Supreme Court, Alonzo A. Skinner was brought with Bryant to serve as the prosecutor.

The next year Chief Justice Bryant resigned from the court. His resignation was effective January 1, 1851.

== Later years ==
After leaving the court, Bryant returned east. He first moved to the nation's capital in Washington, D.C., before returning to Indiana and his hometown of Rockville. William Bryant died there on October 10, 1860.
