= 1820 in rail transport =

This article lists events related to rail transport that occurred in 1820.

== Events ==
- May 1 – The Kington Tramway, a horse-worked plateway, is opened from Eardisley to Kington, Herefordshire, England. Together with the Hay Railway it forms a continuous system 36 miles (45 km) in length, the longest in the United Kingdom at this date.
- October - John Birkinshaw of Bedlington Ironworks patents improvements in the production of wrought iron rails.
- Thomas Gray publishes his first of five editions of Observations on a General Iron Railway, a book that accelerates the British debate on this means of transportation and promotes the concept of a national rail network.
- An early form of monorail in Russia is operated by Ivan Elmanov in Myachkovo, Moscow Oblast.

== Births ==
=== January births ===
- January 21 – Egide Walschaerts, Belgian inventor of a steam locomotive valve gear (d. 1901).

=== April births ===
- April 8 - John Taylor Johnston, president of the Central Railroad of New Jersey, 1848–1877 (d. 1893).

=== May births ===
- May 2 - Robert Gerwig, German civil engineer, designer of Schwarzwald Railway and the Hell Valley Railway (d. 1885).

=== July births ===
- July 31 – John W. Garrett, president of the Baltimore and Ohio Railroad from 1858 (d. 1884).

=== August births ===
- August 6 – Donald Smith, afterwards Lord Strathcona, Scottish financier, promoter of the Canadian Pacific Railway (d. 1914).

=== September births ===
- September 20 – Alfred Belpaire, Belgian inventor of the Belpaire firebox used on steam locomotives (d. 1893).

=== December births ===
- December 21 – William H. Osborn, president of Illinois Central Railroad 1855–1865, president of Chicago, St. Louis and New Orleans Railroad 1875–1882, is born (d. 1894).

=== Unknown death dates ===
- James Beatty, Irish engineer who was involved in building the European and North American Railway and the Grand Crimean Central Railway (d. 1856)
