= Hospital train =

Railway train with carriages equipped for healthcare

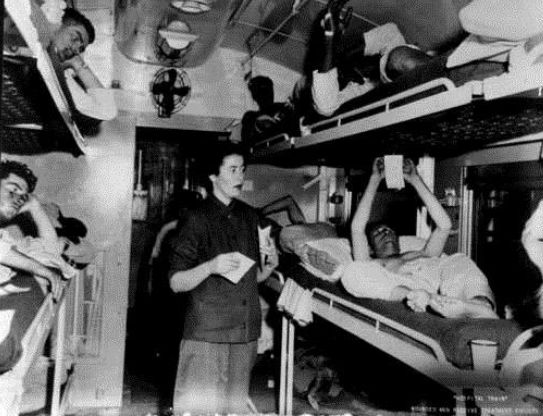
US Army hospital train in 1944

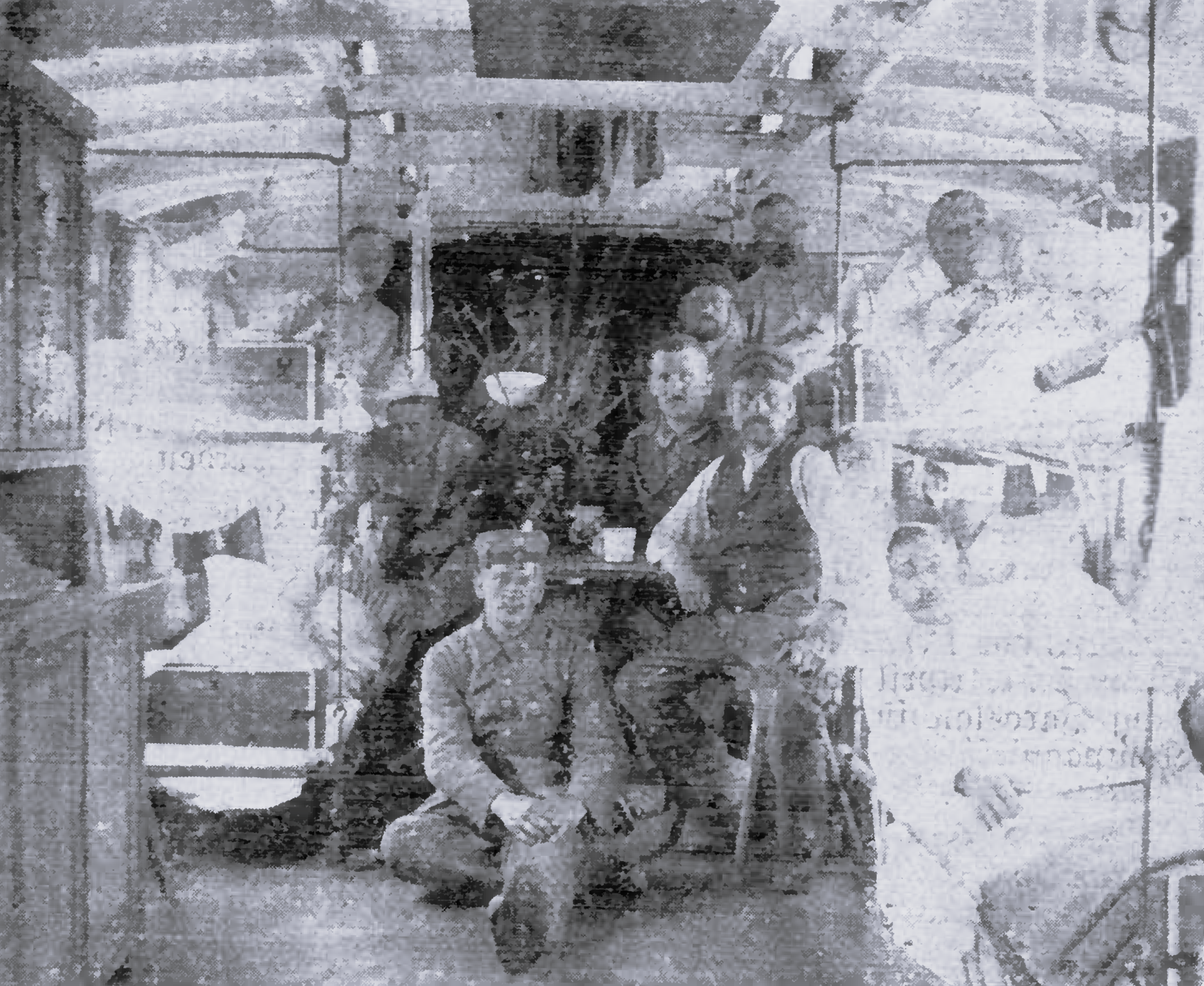
German hospital train in 1915

A hospital train is a railway train with carriages equipped for the provision of healthcare. Historically this has ranged from trains equipped to transport wounded soldiers, with basic nursing and first aid facilities on board, to fully equipped mobile medical centres, sometimes including operating theatres and nursing wards.

== History ==
=== Origins ===
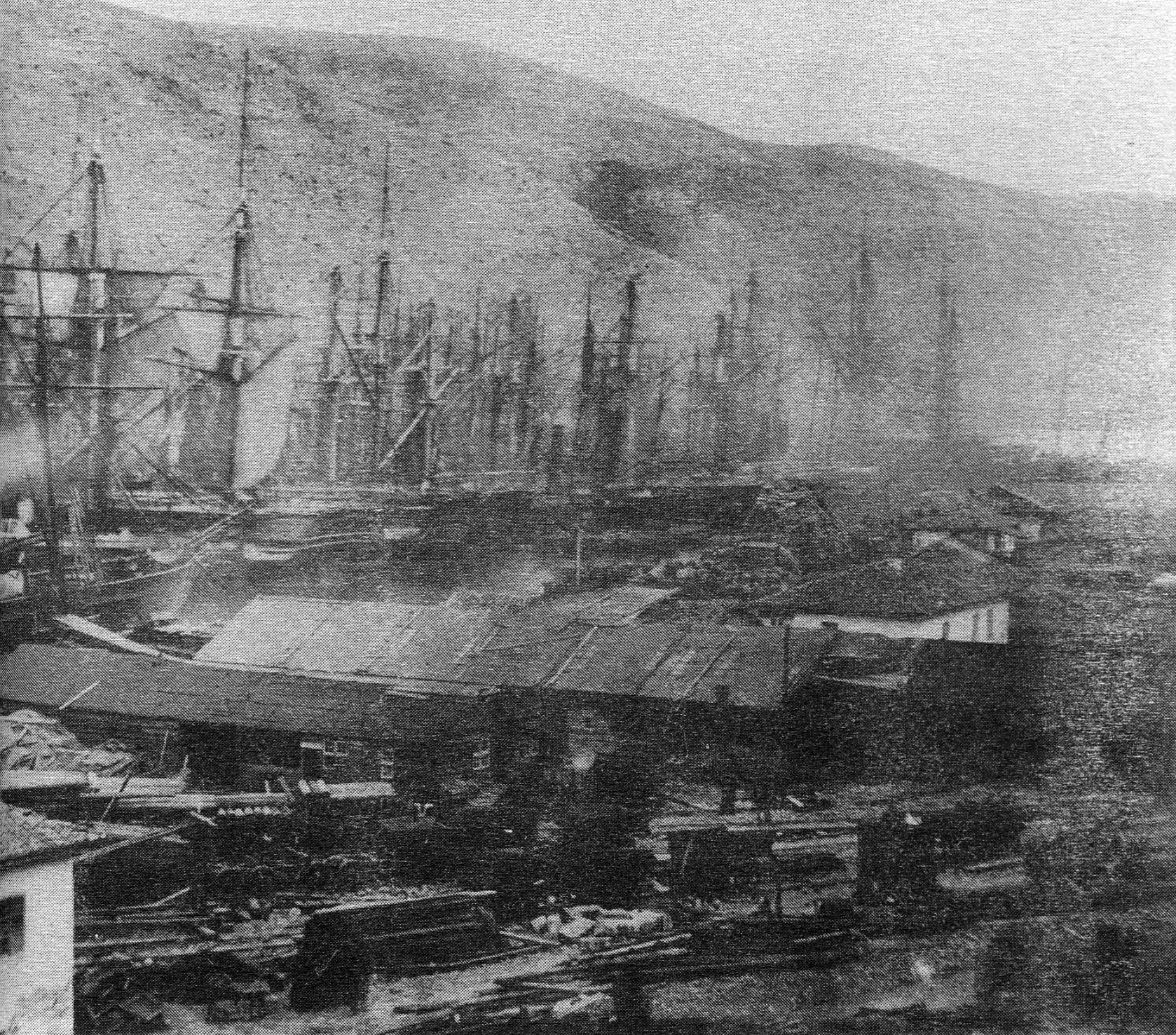
The railway yard at Balaclava, where the first hospital train operated, during the Crimean War. Photograph by Roger Fenton.

The first hospital train was built during the Crimean War in the 1850s. Poorly operated logistical supply networks and inadequate health provisions for the British army encamped around the Russian port of Sevastopol caused a public outcry in England. To alleviate these problems, the Grand Crimean Central Railway was initially built by a partnership of English railway contractors led by Samuel Morton Petoin 1855, to supply ammunition and provisions to Allied soldiers. Within three weeks of the arrival of the fleet carrying materials and men the railway had started to run and in seven weeks 7 miles (11 km) of track had been completed. The railway was a major factor leading to the success of the siege. The line was surveyed by Donald Campbell.

Although the railway's primary function was the supply of armaments and equipment, the train was also used for the transport of the wounded. The first such instance of this occurred on April 2, 1855, when the train was used to carry the sick and injured from the plateau down to the dock at Balaclava. Towards and during the second winter, the supplies carried by the railway were different. The siege had ended, carriage of ammunition was less important, and the supplies related more to the accommodation and comfort of the troops. These included huts to replace tents, clothing, food, books and medical supplies. Following the completion of the Sardinian branch, the railway had reached its limit. In all, it measured about 14 miles (23 km) plus a few miles of sidings and loops.

=== Expansion ===
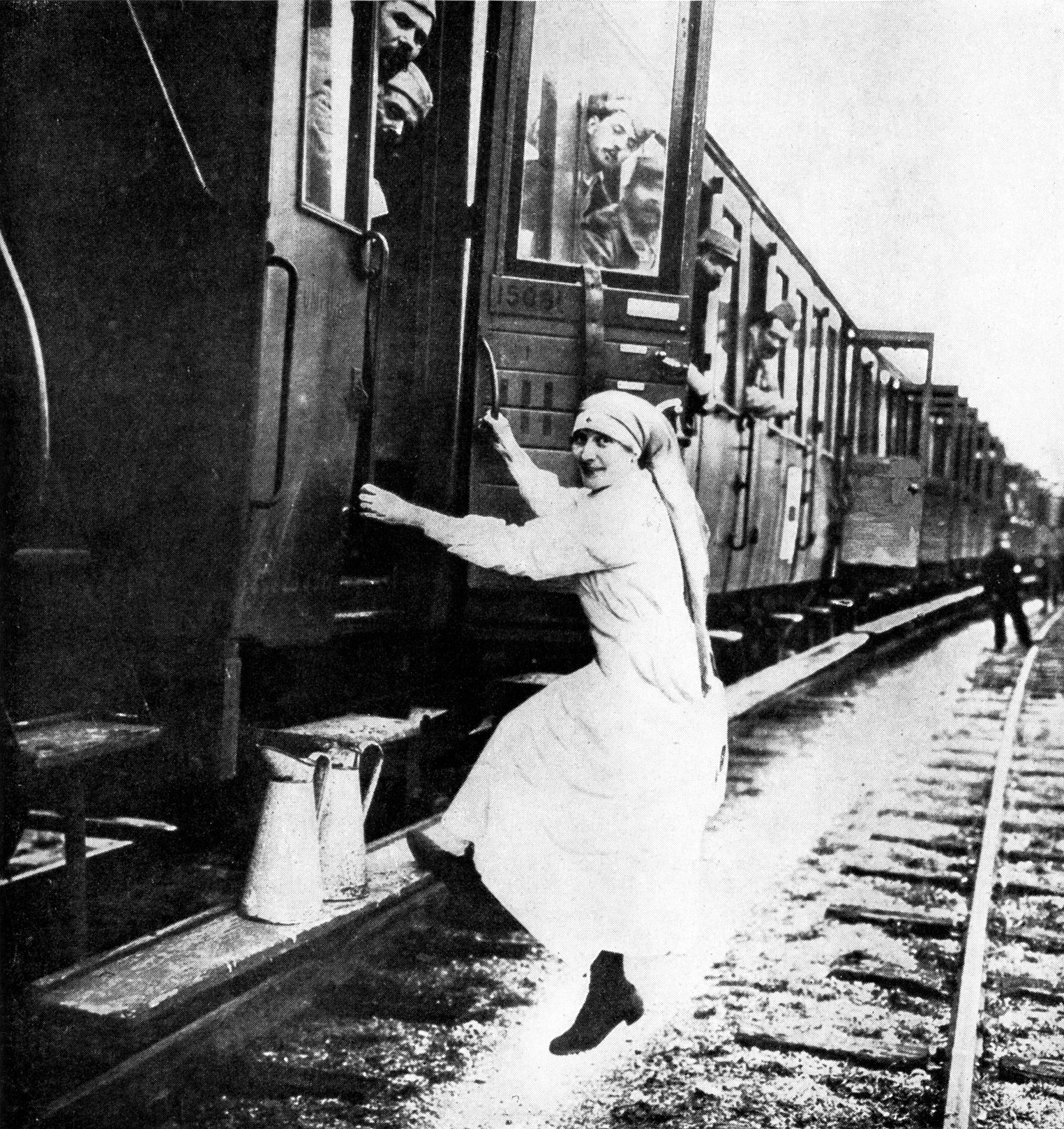
A French Red Cross train bearing sick and wounded soldiers to Paris

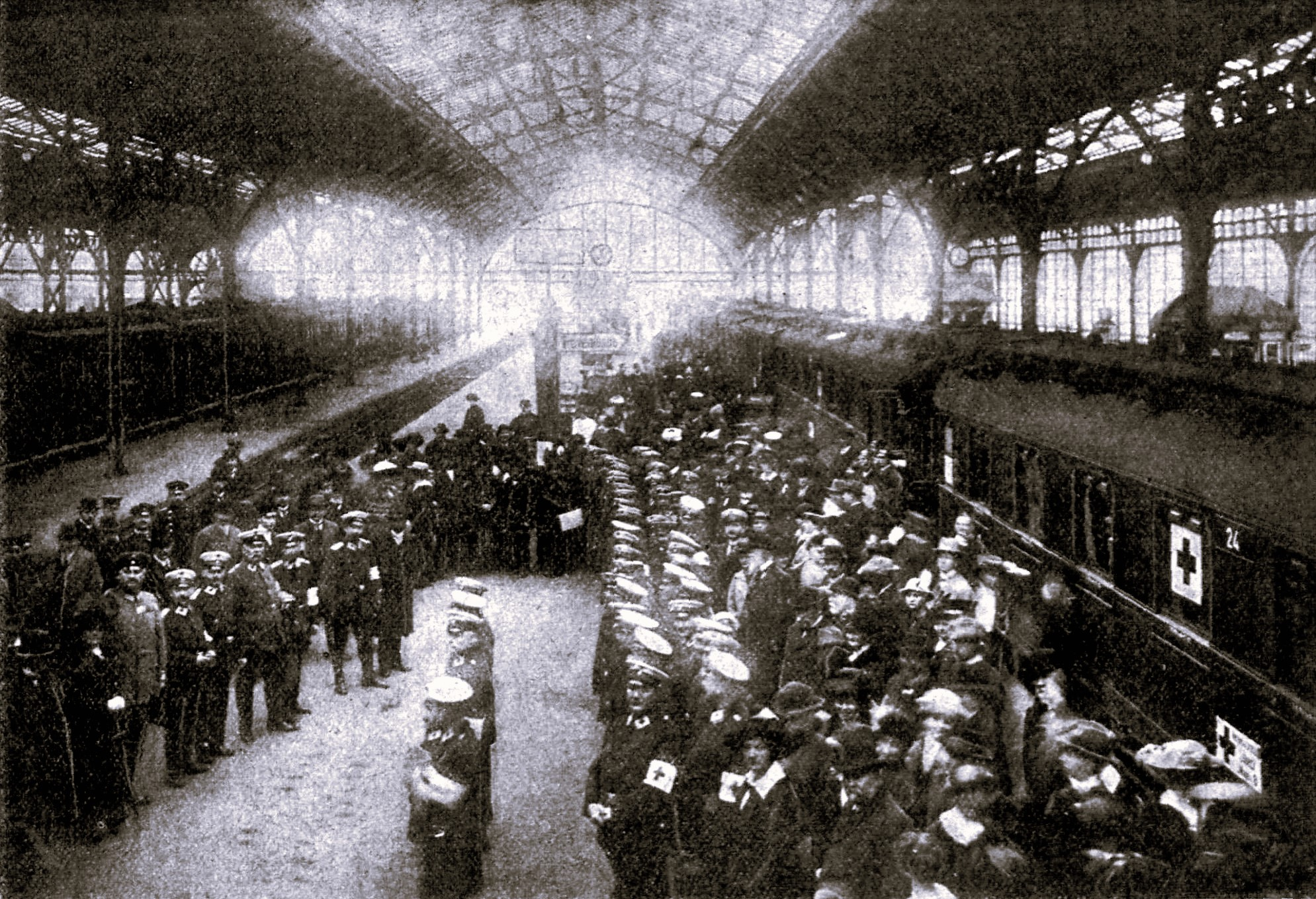
Departure of the hospital train from Lübeck on October 27, 1914

Hospital trains were subsequently used during the Franco-Austrian War, the American Civil War and the Franco-Prussian War. They were also used extensively during colonial campaigns, notably in the Anglo-Zulu War. However, these hospital trains remained primarily as troop trains, with the passengers restricted to the wounded and dying. They had little or nothing in terms of onboard medical facilities, although nurses traveled with the wounded and the carriages of the trains were painted with red crosses to indicate their humanitarian role and to prevent enemy attack.

It was during the First World War that trains began to be used as mobile medical facilities along the Western Front and other subsidiary theatres of the war. Ambulance trains were organised by the Royal Army Medical Corps with onboard surgical wards and essential medical supplies. Trains were used to evacuate over 100,000 British casualties from the battlefield at Flanders in one month of 1914 alone.

These trains were able to connect with hospital ships at French channel ports in order to repatriate wounded British soldiers back to England. There are numbers of extant journal entries from those who experienced the hospital trains of this era, many being referred to as "Great White Hospital Trains", as the carriages were often painted white or red and white.

Hospital trains were used on a large scale during the Second World War by all the major combatants and, to a more limited extent, during the Korean War. By that time, however, mobile motor transport and aerial evacuation supplanted the train as the dominant form of mobile medical provision on the battlefield. The US Army had built special Hospital trains to move wounded soldiers in the US, these operated out of New York, New York; Hampton Roads, Virginia; Charleston, South Carolina; New Orleans, Louisiana; and San Francisco, California.

=== Current Developments ===
In the wake of Russia’s war of aggression against Ukraine, European NATO member states began preparing more intensively once again for a major armed conflict. Medical services revived existing plans for transporting large numbers of wounded across Europe, primarily by quickly converting existing passenger trains into medical evacuation trains. The German company Rheinmetall and the French company Alstom presented another option in September 2026. Their concept for a “MedEvacTrain” involves a fundamental redesign of a field hospital train using a modular container design.

== Currently operating hospital trains ==
=== Russian Hospital Trains ===
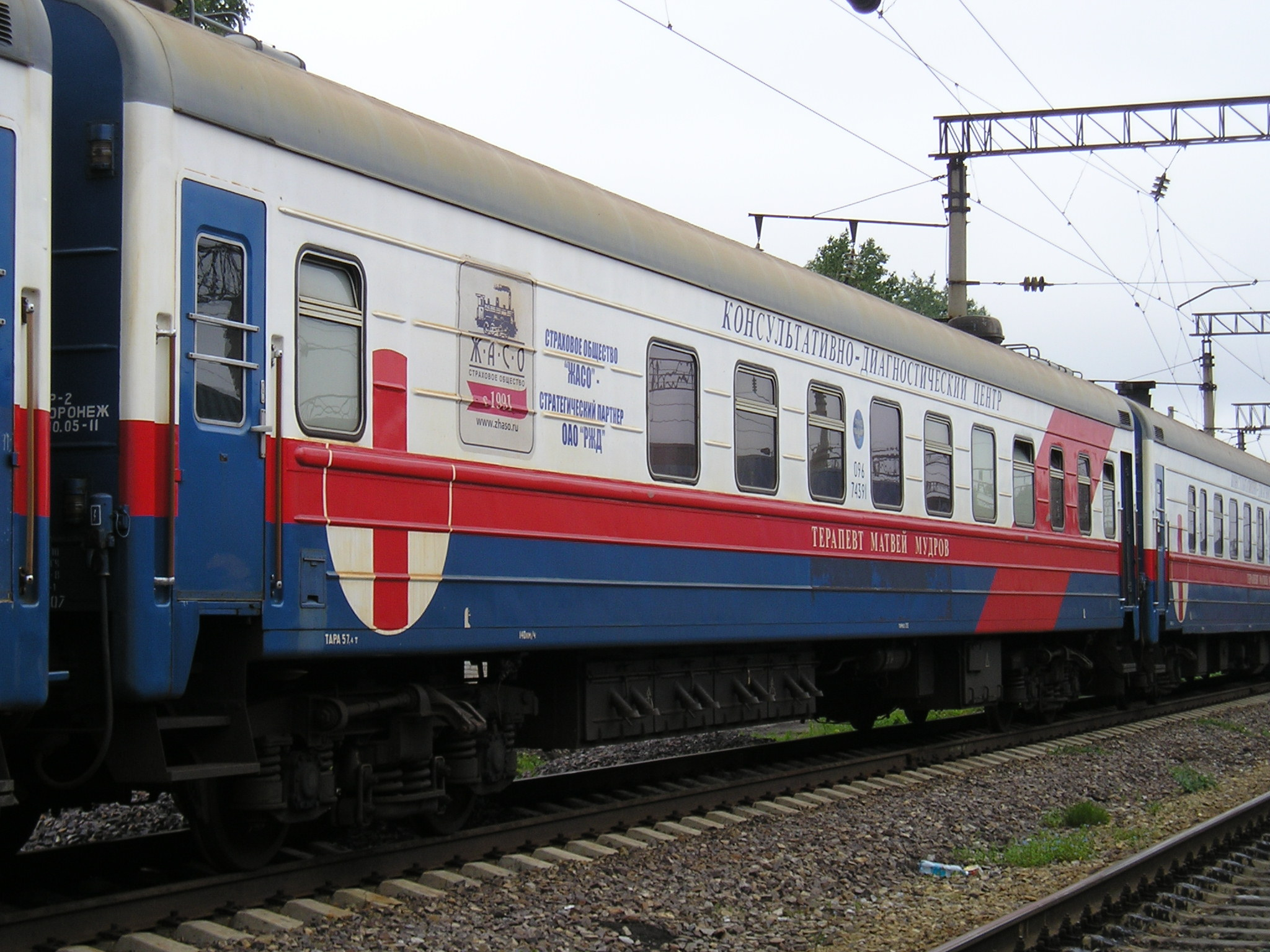
Terapevt Matvey Mudrov, a train-based mobile medical center of Russian Railways

Russian local government and state rail services operate five trains since 2010 during specific times of the year and mostly in hard to reach villages across Siberia. Each train carries medical staff from the regional cities and traveling remote regions.

=== The Sovereign Military Order of Malta ===
The Sovereign Military Order of Malta (SMOM), which is a sovereign entity (similar to an independent country, though with no sovereign land), has a history of operating hospital trains through its military branch following the traditions of the Knights Hospitaller, known as the Military Corps of the Order. The operation of such trains reached its peak in the Second World War, but SMOM continues to operate such trains today. These include trains of carriages to provide shelter to refugees, with basic medical provision, and more technically equipped trains, on which a wide range of medical services may be provided.

=== Dr. Vagón in Mexico ===
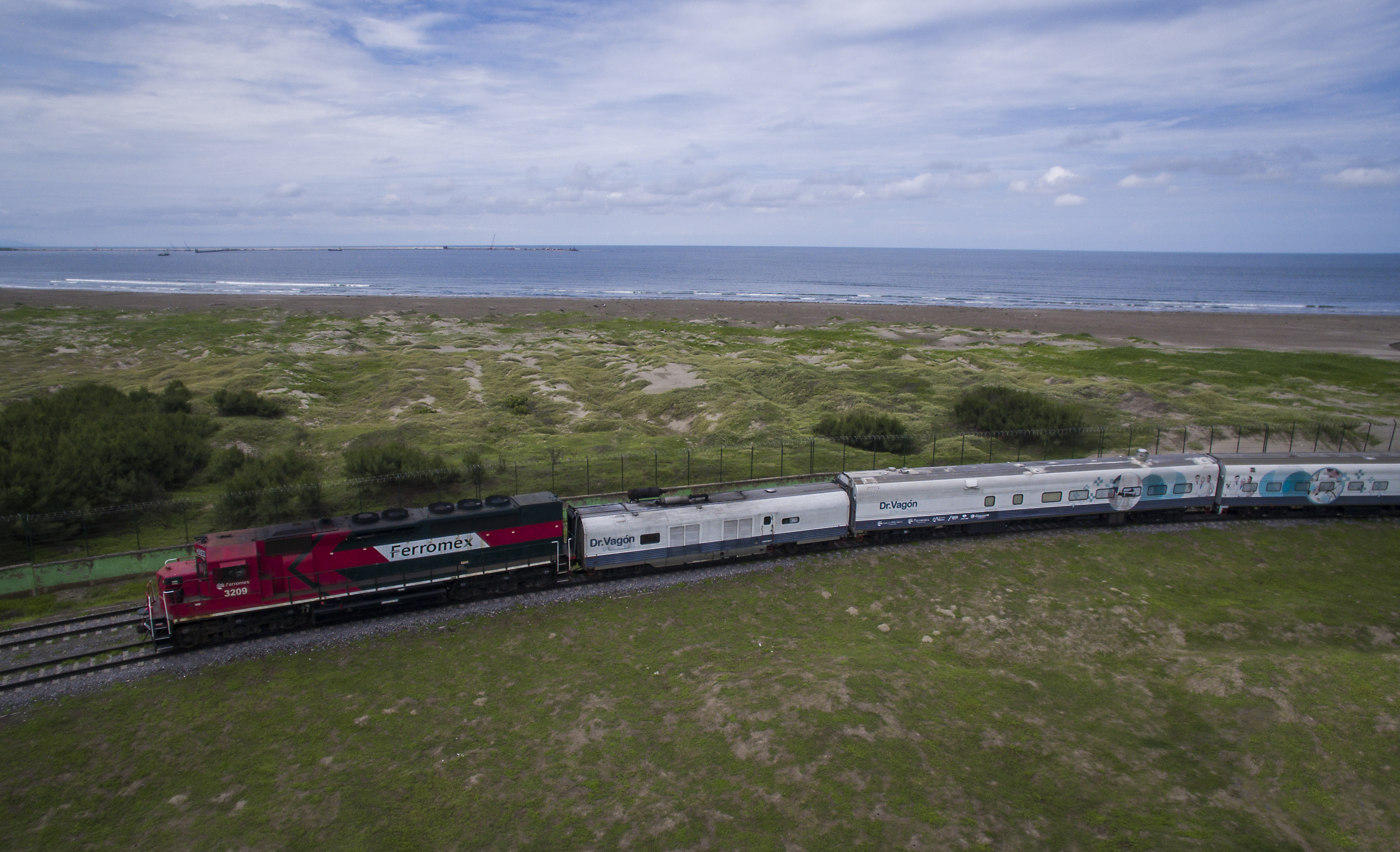
Dr. Vagón in his journey across Mexico

Owned by Fundación Grupo México, in collaboration with Grupo Mexico Transportes (GMxT - Ferromex), Dr. Vagón is a train hospital which offers free, complete healthcare for hard to reach communities in Mexico. Dr. Vagón has made a big impact in communities where health care was not available or was insufficient.

Dr. Vagón is 435 meters long and has 17 fully equipped coaches, with 5 medical offices, bedrooms, dining room, pharmacy and an operation room, among others.

Dr. Vagón has a permanent crew of 64 employees made up of medical and administrative personnel.

Thanks to this infrastructure and human resources, the train can care for more than 500 people a day providing services as general checkups and specialized examinations in ophthalmology, dermatology, pediatrics, geriatrics, and gynecology. It also offers other medical services such as laboratory studies, X-rays studies, among other. Dr. Vagón also provides eyeglasses, hearing aids and free medication.

Having acquired an operating room in late 2019, the Dr. Vagón can carry out ambulatory surgeries. In addition to offering health services, it offers courses and hosts workshops for attendees, as well as showing family-friendly movies.

=== Lifeline Express of India ===
The Lifeline Express is an example of a modern hospital train. Operated by the Impact India Foundation since 1991, these trains have had an impact on Indian rural healthcare provision.

Operating in India, across the extensive network of the Indian Railways, the Lifeline trains (known colloquially as "magic trains") move from town to town, remaining in a siding or platform at each town's railway station for perhaps a week or so, and providing advanced medical services (often beyond the capabilities of local medical centres) to those who apply for them, through a simple vetting or triage process, which ensures services are provided to those most likely to benefit. These trains include nursing wards, and full-scale operating theatres. They have resident medical and nursing staff, but for surgical procedures they rely upon the charitable provision of time and talents by Indian surgeons who spend some of their free time on board the trains for that purpose.

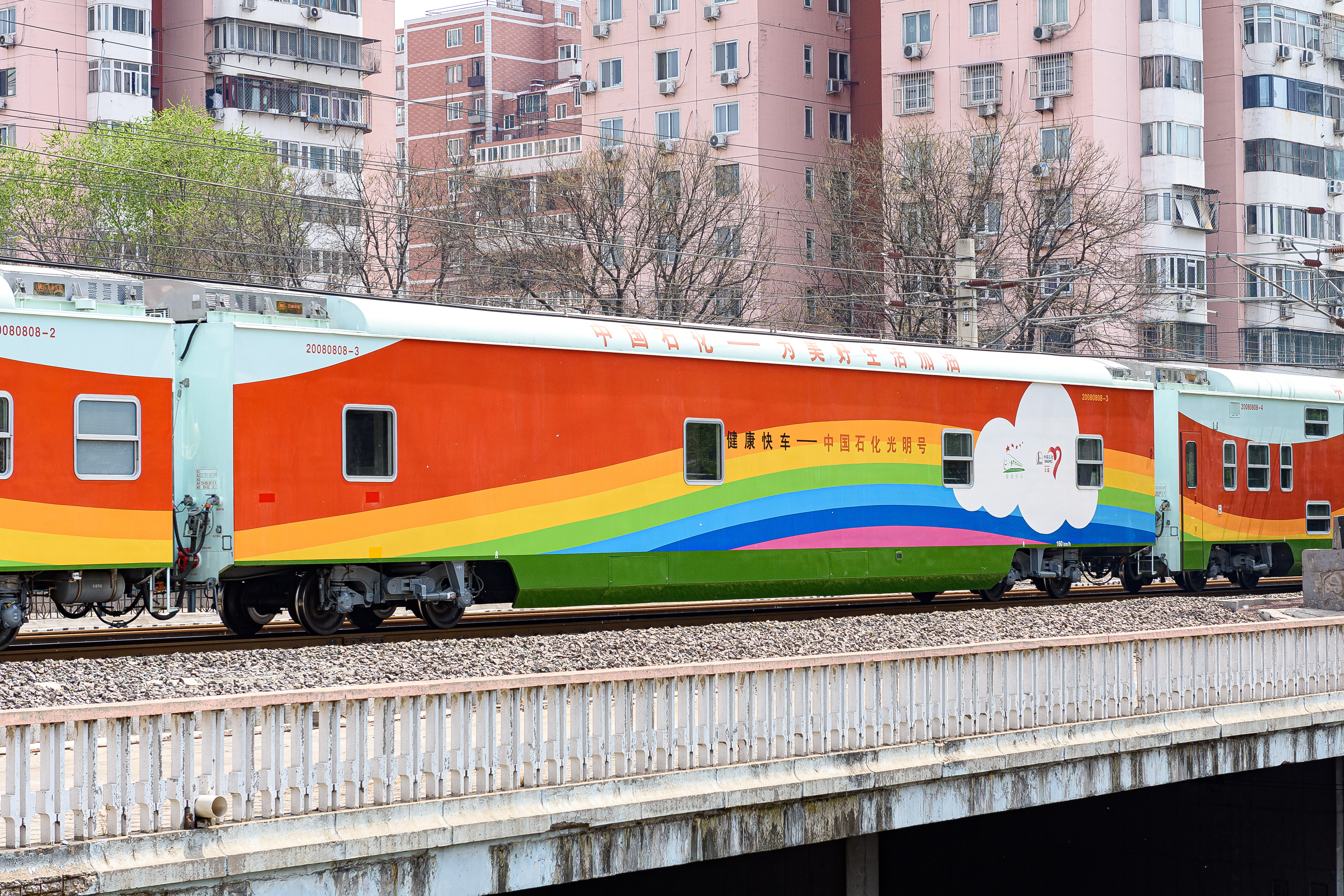
A Lifeline Express coach of China

=== Chinese eye hospital trains ===
The state-owned China Railway company currently operates four eye hospital trains, the fourth and latest being operated through the CSR Corporation, and having entered service in early 2009 for the benefit of residents of the Sichuan Province. A range of ophthalmic surgeries, including the common cataract removal operation, can be provided free of charge on board the trains.

=== Phelophepa Trains in South Africa ===
The Phelophepa trains were founded in 1994 and are sponsored by companies and private donors, including the Colgate Palmolive Company. They operate as mobile hospitals and, as of 2019, have reached 20 million people. Each train serves four provinces each and spends two months in each province. Trains do onboard and community health programs. Services include basic healthcare, psychological counseling, dental, and vision.

=== SNCF Hospital Train ===
French railway SNCF adapted a five-unit TGV high-speed train in March 2020 for use as a mobile hospital in response to the COVID-19 pandemic. The train is used to transport COVID-19 patients to hospitals with available beds.

=== Rail Clinic in Indonesia ===
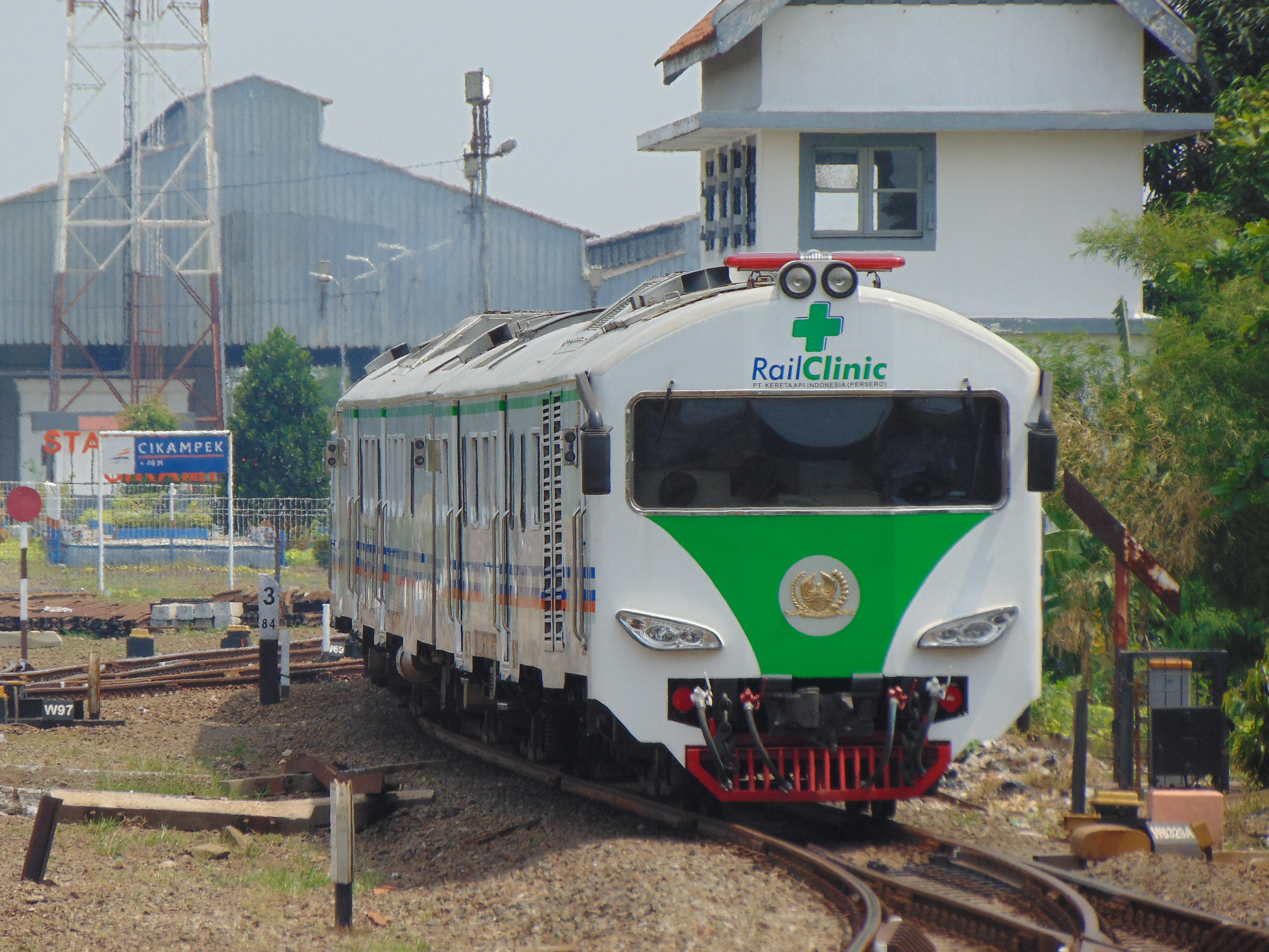
Rail Clinic in Indonesia

The Rail Clinic train is a hospital train operated by the Indonesian state-owned railway company, Kereta Api Indonesia. The health services provided at the train include general check-ups, dental check-ups, pregnancy check-ups, laboratory tests, and pharmaceutical services.

=== Alma hospital train ===
Alma hospital train, which roughly translates to 'soul train', was a hospital train that operated in Argentina from at least 1980 to 2010. It treats children in the Northwest region of the country outside of cities. It reportedly left once a month, making 8–9 trips per year, each lasting 15 days with about 15 professional volunteers on board and helping roughly 500 to 600 children per trip.

== Gallery ==
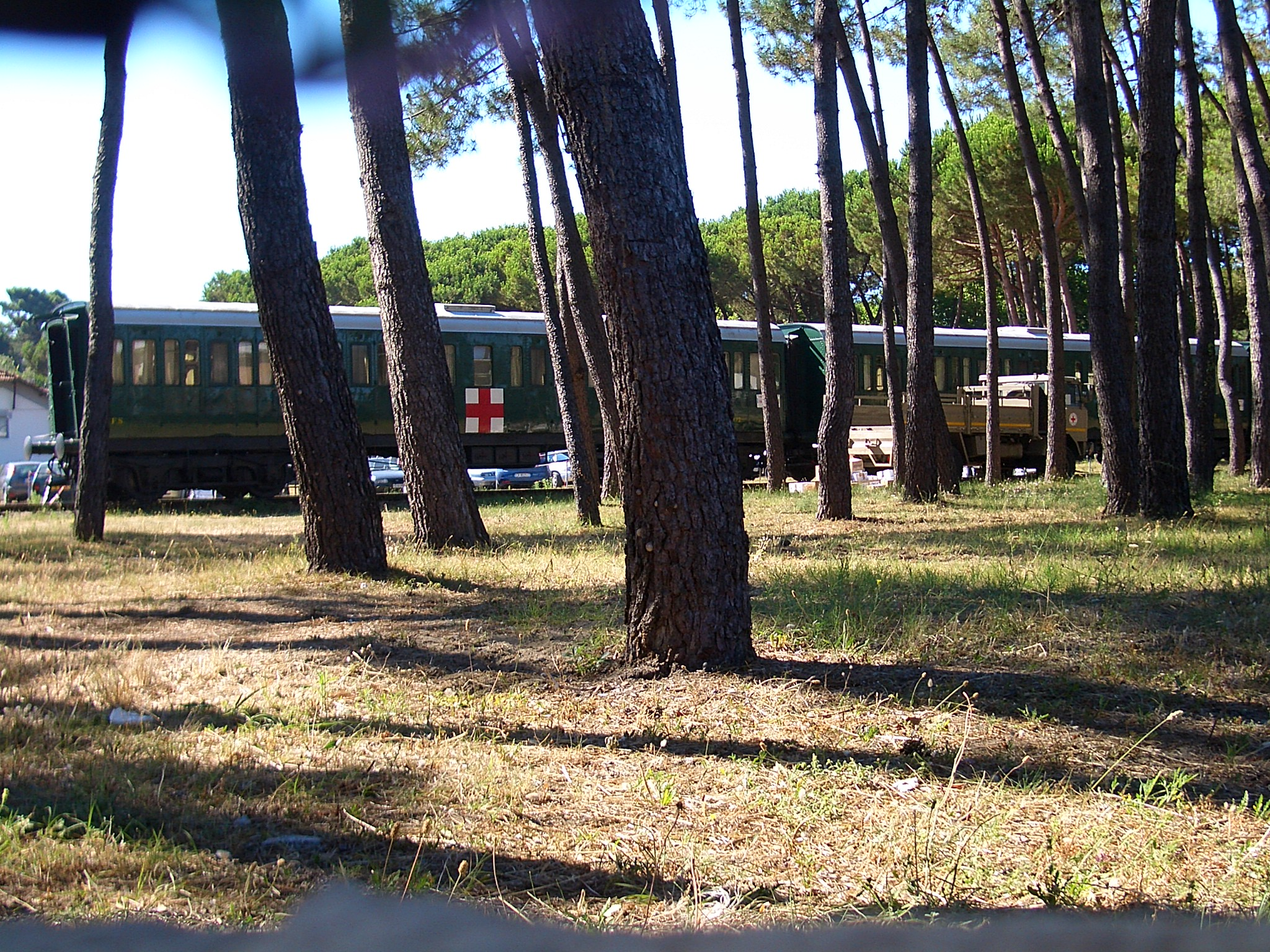
Hospital train cars parked on the grounds of the VIIIth Mobilization Center of Italian Red Cross, near Marina di Massa, Tuscany

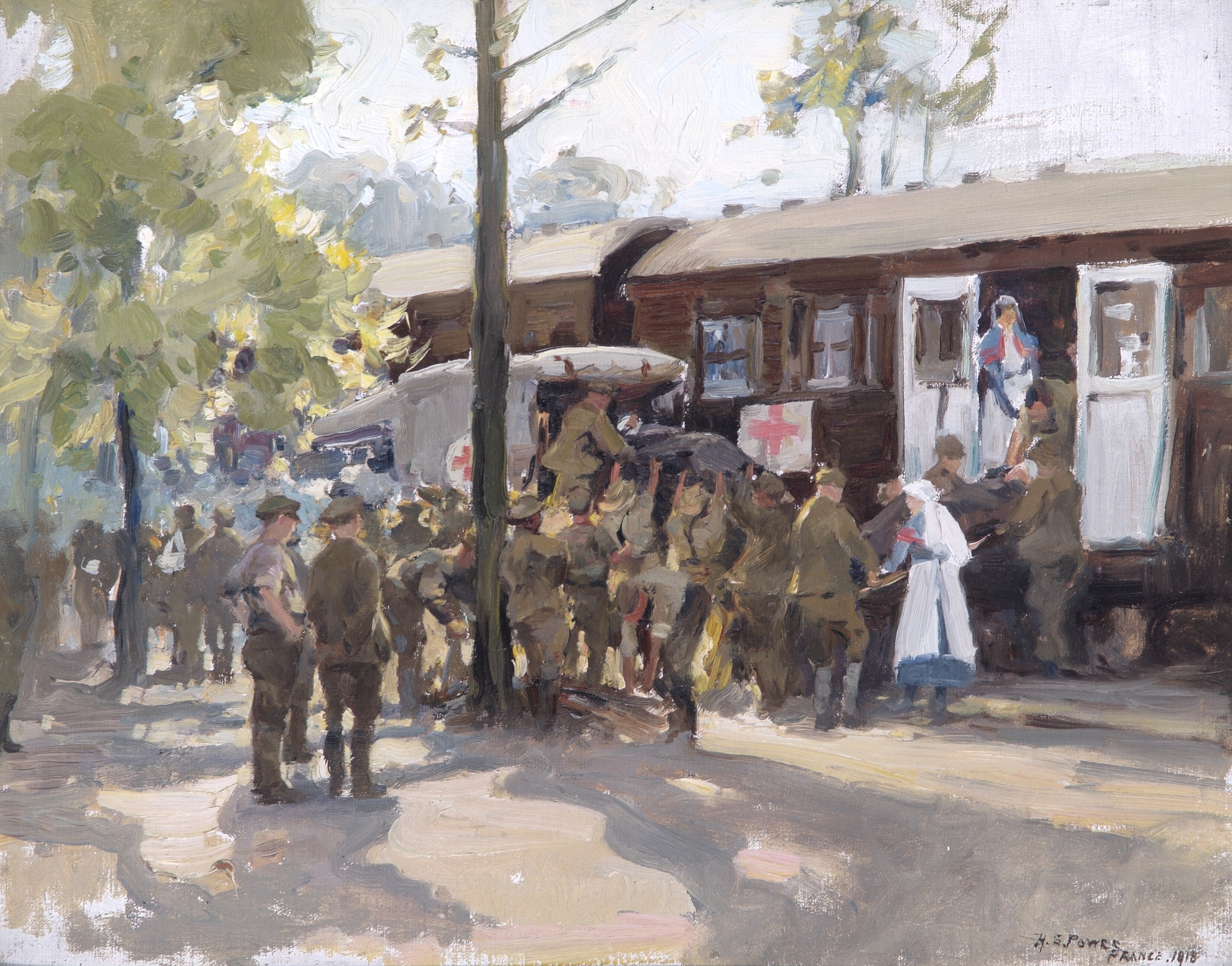
A Red Cross Train, France; wounded British soldiers are transferred from a motor ambulance to a Red Cross train, 1918, artist Harold Septimus Power

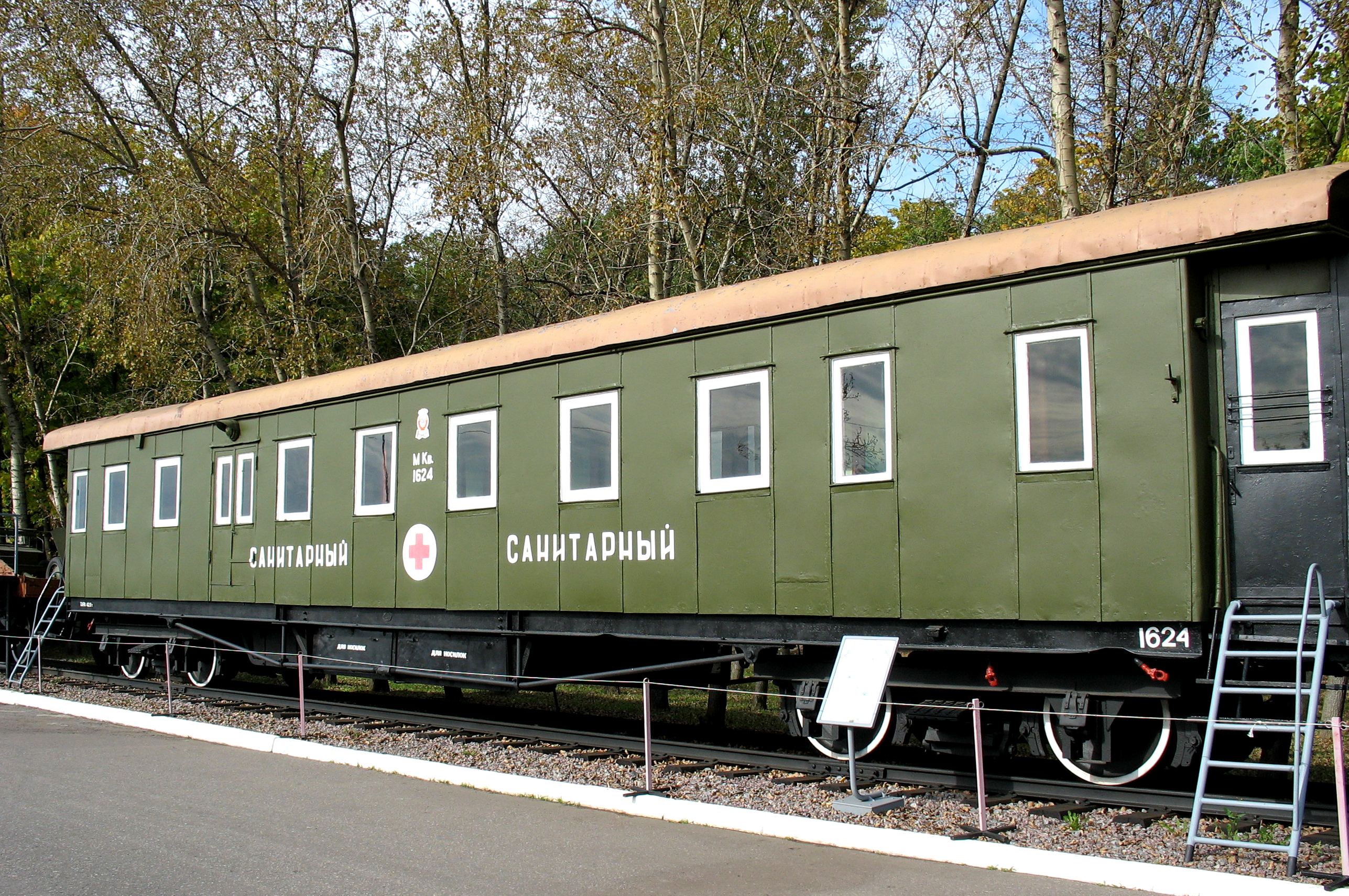
A hospital train car in Russia's National WWII Museum

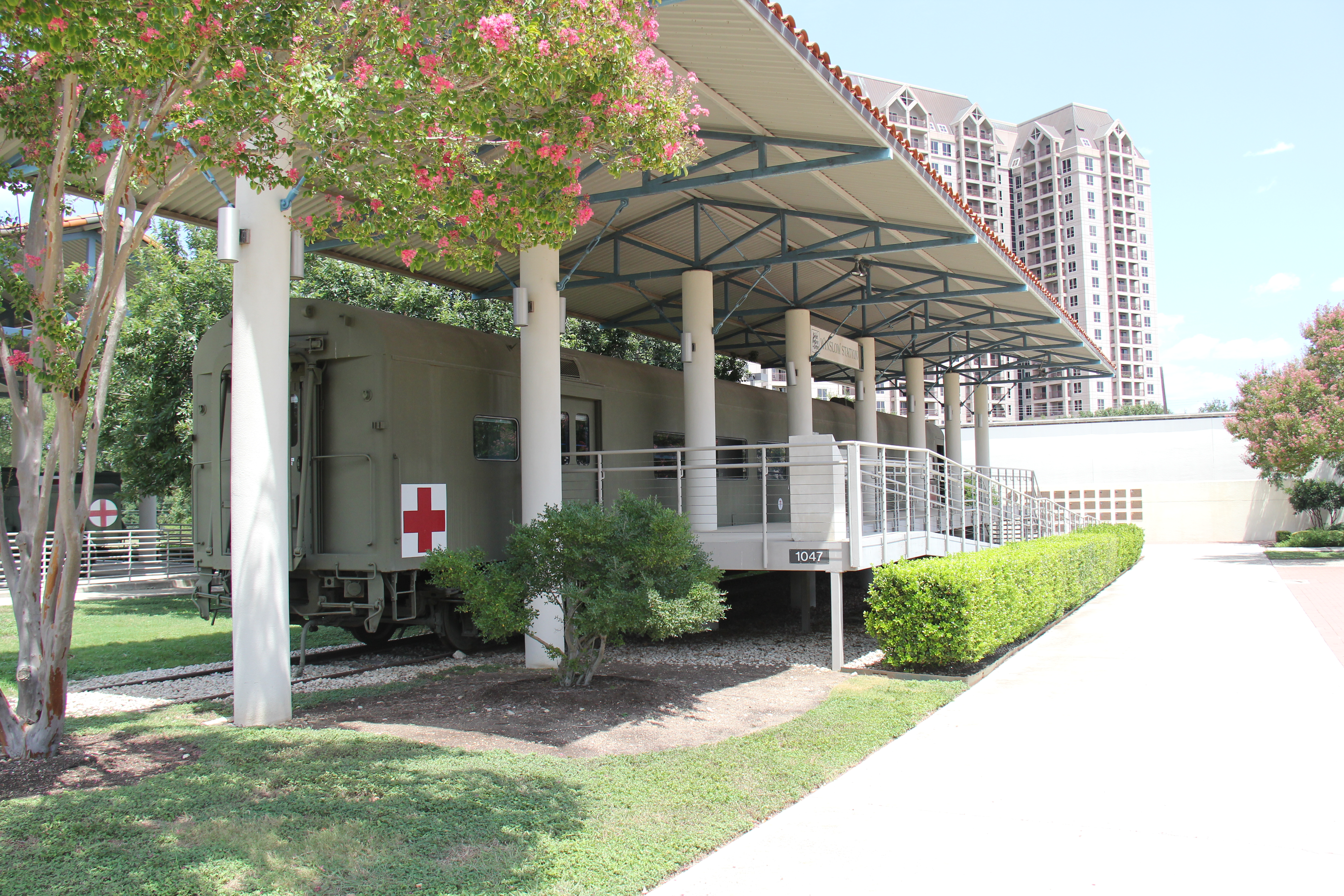
United States Army Medical Kitchen car at the United States Army Medical Department Museum

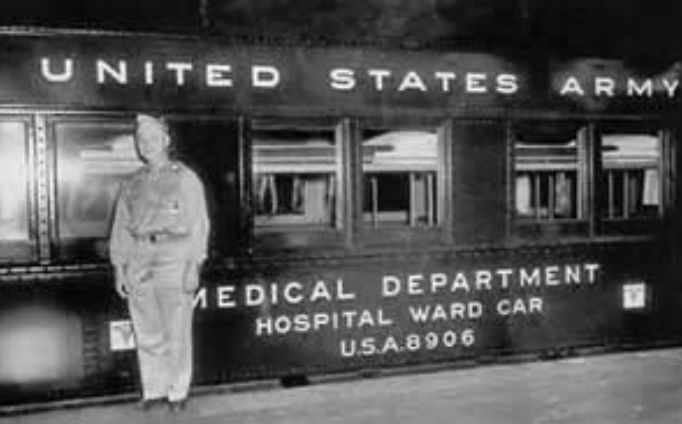
US Army hospital car in 1944

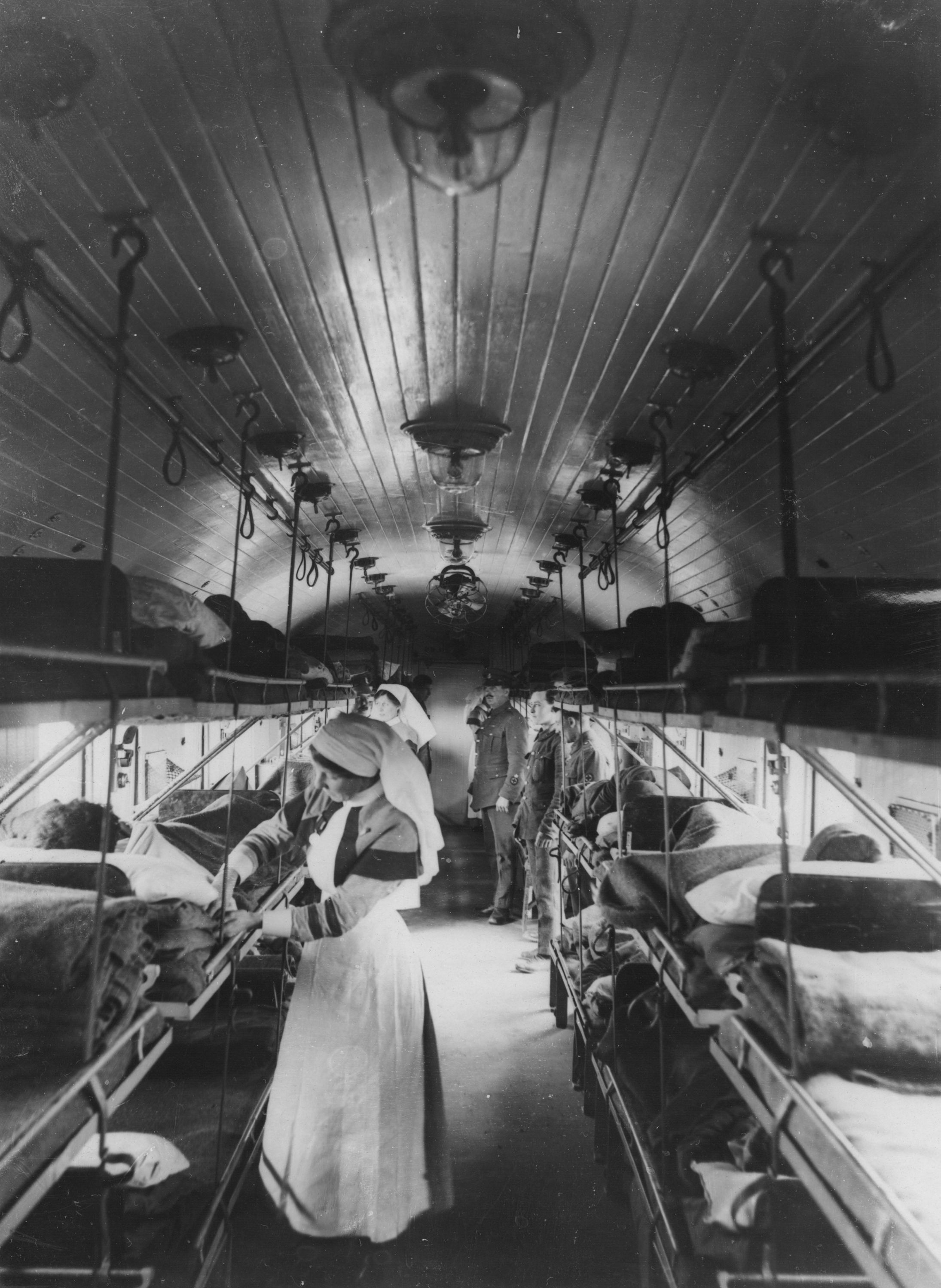
British hospital train in France during World War I

== See also ==
- Hospital ship
- Rail ambulance
- Railway surgery
