= Monorails in Russia =

Russian monorails date back to the 19th century. Russia was a pioneer in the design and construction of monorails, from early horse-drawn models to later electrical and magnetic levitation systems.

== Early designs ==
The first Russian monorail was built by Ivan Elmanov in Myachkovo village, near Moscow in 1820. In this "road on pillars", horses pulled railroad carriages placed on a horizontal beam. The wheels were mounted on the beam, not on the carriages. Elmanov could not find investors to fund for his project, and stopped working on the monorail. In 1821, Henry Palmer patented a similar monorail design in the UK, not being aware the Elmanov project.

In 1836, Prince Beloselsky-Belozersky proposed another monorail design which contained two rows of wheels on mounted on a pillar structure.

In 1872, a monorail designed by Lyarsky was shown at a polytechnic exhibition in Moscow.

In 1874, Alexei Khludov constructed a monorail for transporting wood.

== Electric monorails ==
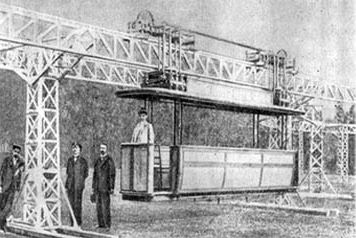
Monorail by Ippolit W. Romanow

In March 1895, Russian engineer Ippolit Romanov built a prototype of an electric monorail in Odessa, modern-day Ukraine. In 1897, he presented a functional model of his monorail at the meeting of Russian technological society. This idea was approved by the society, and an experimental electric monorail was built in 1899. In 1900, Empress Maria Fedorovna approved the building of an 0.2 kilometres (0.12 mi) long electric monorail in Gatchina. The monorail was tested on 25 June 1900. The monorail carriage could be loaded with up to 25 kilograms (55 lb) and moved at a speed of 15 kilometres per hour (9.3 mph).

In 1904 Russian engineer Koshkin in collaboration with Romanov designed a monorail that would connect St Petersburg and Moscow. The proposed train speed was up to 200 kilometres per hour (120 mph). This ambitious project was approved by the Ministry of Roads, but was not financed. A similar proposal of a monorail from Moscow to Nizhny Novgorod was not funded, as well.

In 1911, professor of Tomsk Technological Institute B.P. Vainberg invented a train on an electromagnetic support that was driven by linear synchronous electrical motor. This design was similar to the magnetic monorail built by Emile Bachelet in France in 1910. Vainberg's experimental model permitted to transfer 10 kg carriages. In 1911-1913 Vainberg experimented with his model, and then proposed building an experimental track in which trains would move at a speed of 800–1000 km/h. This project was not realized.

== Soviet era ==
In 1921, a construction of a 32 kilometres (20 mi) monorail connecting Saint Petersburg and Tsarskoye Selo was commenced. Petr Petrovich Shklovskiy was the author of that project. The monorail was planned to have gyroscopic stabilization (first patented by Brennan in 1903). The proposed monorail train consisted of a motor car and a 50-seat passenger car. The travel speed was supposed to reach 150 km/h. A 12 km monorail track was constructed in 4 months, and a Saint Petersburg factory was contracted to build a train. In May 1922, the project funding ceased. Shilovskiy went to the Great Britain where he worked for Sperry Gyroscope Company.

In the 1920-1930s theoretical and practical works on monorails were conducted by Vyacheslav Petrovich Tikhostsky and his colleagues. Several experimental monorails were built: Sipyaginskaya, Solotchinskaya, Lyskovskaya and Redkinskaya.

In the 1950s a monorail construction project was launched in Kamchatka, but only an experimental line was built.

From mid 1950s to 1960s passenger monorails were planned for Karaganda, Magnitogorsk and Miass, but their construction did not begin.

In the 1950s a railway that combined features of a monorail and a cable car was proposed for Volzhskaya hydro-electric power station. A similar design was proposed in 1961 by I. Ivanova for public transportation.

In 1967 scientists of Kiev Polytechnic Institute jointly with engineers of Dzerzhinsky plant pioneered the monorail with linear asynchronous motor. The construction of a 525 metres (1,722 ft) circular line at the exhibition of modern technologies in Kiev was funded by Ukrainian government. Similar monorails were built in Germany in 1969.

Intensive research on magnetic monorails was conducted in the Soviet Union in the 1970-1980s. In 1977 the first in the world monorail with magnetic support was planned in Alma Ata, Kazakhstan. This plan was not fulfilled.

== 1991-present ==
In 2004 the 4.7 kilometres (2.9 mi) Moscow Monorail opened in Russia's capital.
