= Donald Campbell (engineer) =

Donald Campbell was a railway engineer in the 19th century.

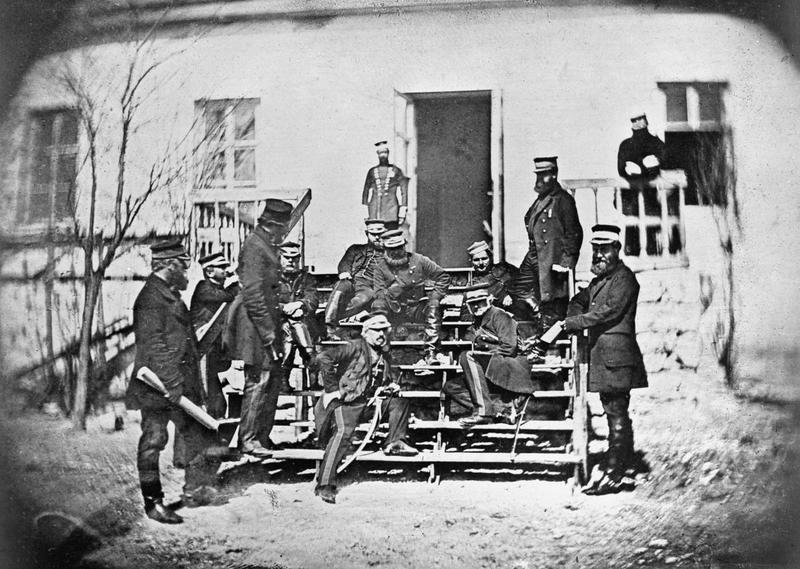
Campbell (far left), with the staff of General Codrington at Sebastopol in 1855

Campbell worked on the survey of the New Brunswick section of the European and North American Railway with James Beatty. When Peto, Brassey and Betts were commissioned to build the Grand Crimean Central Railway to transport supplies to the Allied troops in the Crimean War, Beatty was appointed as chief engineer and Campbell as his assistant. In December 1854 Campbell left Canada for the Crimea and by the time Beatty arrived in January 1855 the survey for the first part of the line was more or less complete. When Beatty returned to England in November 1855, unwell after having been injured in an accident, Campbell was appointed to take his place as chief engineer.
