= Nellie Fong =

Hong Kong politician and chartered accountant

The Honourable Nellie Fong Wong Kut-man GBS, JP
- 方黃吉雯
- Appointed by: Sir David Wilson

Non-official Member of the Executive Council
- In office 1 July 1997 – 30 June 2002
- Appointed by: Tung Chee-hwa

Appointed member of the Legislative Council
- In office 12 October 1988 – 22 August 1991

Personal details
- Born: 7 February 1949 (age 77) British Hong Kong
- Spouse: Eddy Fong
- Education: Belilios Public School
- Occupation: Accountant, politician

Nellie Fong Wong Kut-man, GBS, JP, FCA, FHKICPA, (Chinese: 方黄吉雯; born 1949) is a Hong Kong legislator, health care activist and chartered accountant.

== Early life and education ==
Nellie Fong was born and raised in Hong Kong. She studied at the Belilios Public School before leaving Hong Kong for the United Kingdom in 1968 to study accountancy. She is currently a fellow of the Institute of Chartered Accountants in England and Wales, a fellow member of the Hong Kong Institute of Certified Public Accountants, and a member of the UK's Chartered Institute of Taxation.

== Professional career ==
Fong returned to Hong Kong in 1973 and worked as a professional accountant. She became a partner of Arthur Andersen & Co. in 1981. From 2002–07 she was Chairman of PricewaterhouseCoopers' China Operations. She retired in July 2007.

== Political career ==
Fong was a member of the Urban Council and District Board from 1983–89, and a member of the Hong Kong Legislative Council of Hong Kong from 1988–1991. She was appointed a Justice of Peace in 1988. In 1992, she was among the first batch of Hong Kong Affairs Advisors to the Chinese Government. Between 1993 and 1997, Fong served as a member of the Preparatory Committee (transition team organised by the Chinese Central Government) on Hong Kong's Transfer of Sovereignty to China and Fong was the Convenor of the Economic Subgroup.

In 1995, Fong organised the Better Hong Kong Foundation and was Chairman of the Executive Committee from 1995–2001.

From 1977–2002, Fong was appointed by Mr C H Tung, the first Chief Executive of HKSAR to be a member of the HKSAR Executive Council from January 1997 – June 2002.

In 1999 Fong began assisting the State-owned Assets Supervision and Administration Commission of the State Council in the training of leaders of Important Key State-owned Enterprises and had helped many state-owned enterprises to get listed overseas.

In 2003 and 2008, respectively, Fong became a member of the 10th and 11th National Committee of the Chinese People's Political Consultative Conference (CPPCC).

== Lifeline Express ==
In 1996, Fong founded a charity project called Lifeline Express, a hospital eye-train which travels to remote areas of China to provide free surgical operations for cataract patients. In 2002, she organised the Chinese Foundation for Lifeline Express, a charity incorporated in China and of which she is the Executive vice-chairman. Between 1997 and 2008, over 87,000 cataract patients had received free operations. There are now four eye-trains continuously shuttling between rural areas in mainland China operating on over 14,000 cataract patients each year. She was founding Chairman of the Lifeline Express Hong Kong Foundation. In 2005 Fong saw the need for training eye-doctors in less developed areas in Mainland China. She then started building a network of Microsurgical Eye Training Centers in the less developed provinces. Continuous training is being conducted within this network through telemedicine, the use of wet laboratories and a training website, lxlearn.com.

Fong convinced the International Council of Ophthalmology to introduce its examinations to China in Chinese as there are no common examinations for specialist doctors in China and she worked with the Chinese Medical Examination Center to hold the ICO exams in 14 locations in China in 2009. She also established an Awards System for the top three candidates in the ICO examinations and a Scholarship Fund to assist eye-doctors who have passed the ICO examinations to go overseas on a Fellowship program.

== Awards and honours ==
- Gold Bauhinia Star (1999).
- Chinese Individual Charity Award (2005), issued by China's Ministry of Civil Affairs,
- 2006 Award of China's Top 10 Individuals from Industry and Commerce, issued by CPPCC's joint Committee on Education, Science, Culture, Health and Sports,
- Outstanding Individual Award on Charity (November 2008), issued by China's Ministry of Civil Affairs.
- Clinton Global Initiative Award (December 2008), from US President Bill Clinton for her efforts to relieve cataract blindness in rural areas of Mainland China.
- Asia Philanthropists 2014 from Forbes

Order of precedence
Preceded by Kwong Ki-chi; Recipients of the Gold Bauhinia Star	Hong Kong order of precedence Recipients of the Gold Bauhinia Star	Succeeded by Michael Suen; Recipients of the Gold Bauhinia Star
