= Henry Robinson Palmer =

British civil engineer

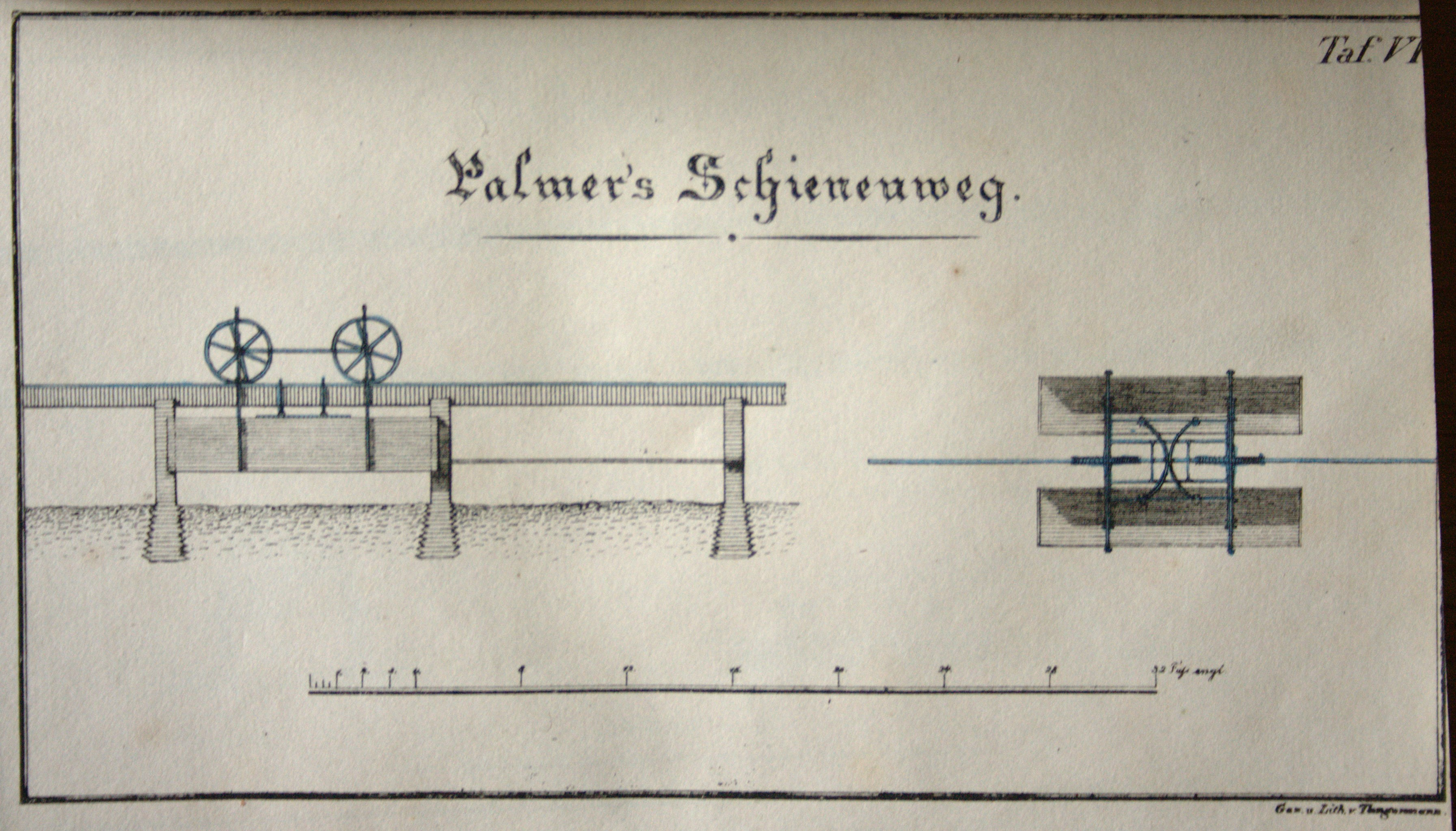
Draft of Palmer's monorail

Henry Robinson Palmer (13 August 1793 – 12 September 1844) was an English civil engineer who designed the world's second monorail and the first elevated railway. He is also credited as the inventor of corrugated metal roofing, which is one of the world's major building materials.

== Early life ==
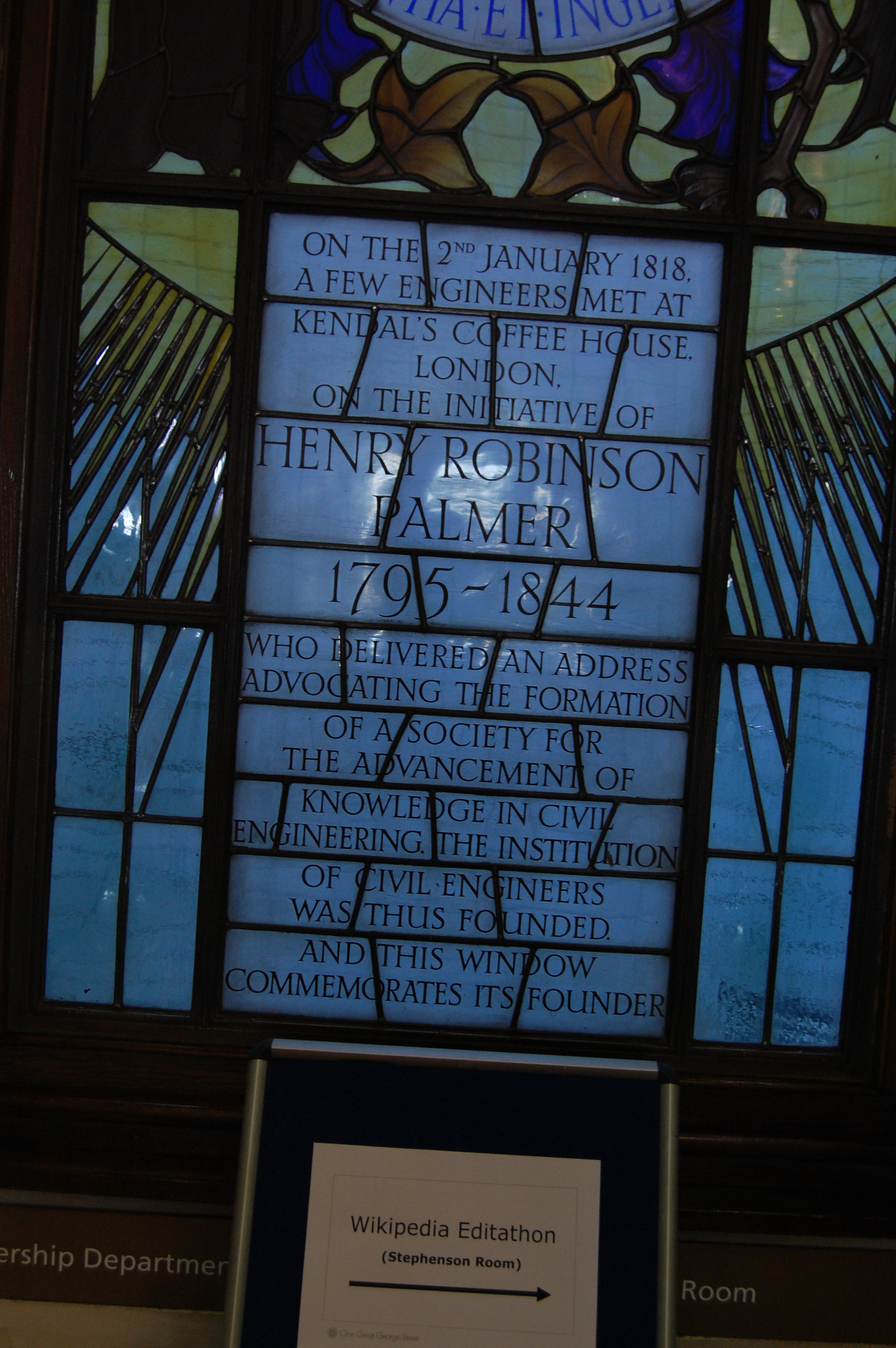
Window at One Great George Street commemorating Palmer's role in the founding of the Institution of Civil Engineers in 1818

A son of Samuel Palmer and his wife Elizabeth Walker, Henry Robinson Palmer was born in Hackney, east London. He served a five-year apprenticeship with the mechanical engineer Bryan Donkin from 1811, where he also became a skilled draughtsman. He was then taken on by Thomas Telford, for whom he worked for some seven years, rising to become his chief assistant. He carried out numerous surveys for Telford, including the Knaresborough Canal and Railway, Burnham Marshes, Archway Road London, Portishead Harbour, and the Isles of Scilly. He may have acted as the resident engineer for the Loose Hill and Valley Road improvement scheme, which he surveyed in 1820.

In 1821 he obtained a patent for a monorail system, which was deemed at the time to be somewhat impractical, but his work on resistance to tractive effort was much more important. In 1825 he visited the Stockton and Darlington Railway and the Hetton colliery railway. On the latter he carried out a series of tests on behalf of Telford, to measure the amount of resistance that horses and locomotives had to overcome to move their loads. Further tests were carried out with boats on a number of canals, including the Ellesmere Canal, the Mersey and Irwell Navigation and the Grand Junction Canal. The results of these experiments were quoted in Parliament, when navigation interests opposed the bill to authorise the Liverpool and Manchester Railway, for instance.

== Solo career ==
By 1825, Palmer was keen to set up on his own. The Kentish Railway had employed Telford to be its engineer when the scheme was launched in 1824, but after he withdrew, Palmer took over, surveying a route that ran from Dover to Woolwich via Strood and Erith, with a section north of the River Thames beyond Woolwich. Reservations about a bridge over the River Medway, and what to do at Woolwich meant that funding did not materialise, and the scheme folded before a full survey was completed. He was approached again in the 1830s, when there were plans to revive the scheme. Also in 1825, he was asked to survey the Norfolk and Suffolk Railway scheme, but when he submitted an invoice for £1,573 in August 1826, there were not enough subscribers to meet such expense. He received about half of the money and the scheme was abandoned.

He had more success with the scheme to extend the Eastern Dock in London. This had been designed by William Chapman, and Palmer took over as resident engineer when the original incumbent, J. W. Hemingway, died in 1825. He had overall responsibility for the works after the works supervisor Daniel Asher Alexander retired in 1828. The project involved construction of the dock, warehousing, an extrance lock and basins at Shadwell, and some swing bridges. The works were substantially finished by 1833, but by the time he left they company in 1835, there were issues with the entrance lock walls, which were resolved by George Rennie and John Smeaton. There were suggestions that he was too busy with other work to provide adequate supervision.

During his career, he seems to have carried out a lot of surveys, but saw few of the schemes through to completion. Notable exceptions were improvements to Penzance harbour from 1836 to 1839, work on Ipswich Docks from 1837 to 1842, and two Welsh schemes in 1840, on Port Talbot Harbour and Swansea Bridge. He was again involved in a railway route to Dover, giving evidence to the engineer in 1836, and organising surveys conducted by others, but he was in poor health, and William Cubitt was appointed engineer when the act of Parliament was obtained. The Port Talbot harbour scheme was hampered by inadequate capital, and Palmer diverted flood water to scour out the channel, as he could not employ sufficient labourers. The Ipswich Docks scheme was his design, which he supervised until 1842, when he retired, leaving his resident engineer G. Horwood to complete the work.

== Legacy ==
Although Palmer was a prolific surveyor, he left few major schemes by which his work can be assessed. However, his main enduring legacy is the Institution of Civil Engineers (ICE), which he founded in 1818. He was keen on self-improvement, and set up a mechanics institute when he was working in Bermondsey, between 1813 and 1814. This led him to plan a grander scheme, where young engineers could discuss engineering issues, and learn from one another. With several other young engineers, the inaugural meeting of the ICE was held on 2 January 1818, and the aims and objectives which he laid out have stood the test of time, with only the upper age limit being relaxed. This allowed Telford to become president, with Palmer as vice-president, and the institution prospered under their joint leadership. In his capacity as vice-president, he represented the Institution at the laying of the first stone of Ipswich Docks.

He died in 1844, just two years after retiring. All of his papers, including more than 400 drawings, were given to the ICE by his widow, but were subsequently lost.

== Monorails ==
Palmer made a patent application in 1821 for an elevated single rail supported on a series of pillars in an ordinary distance of ten feet, inserted into conical apertures in the ground, with carriages suspended on both sides, hanging on two wheels the one placed before the other. A horse is connected to the carriage with a towing rope, proceeding on one side of the rail on a towing path.

There was an earlier monorail in Russia, of which Palmer was unaware. By 1823 George Smart had set up a trial version of Palmer's monorail.

Palmer wrote in the study presenting his system:

"the charge of carrying the raw material to the manufacturing district, and the manufactured article to the market, forming no small proportion of its price to the consumer.[...] The leading problem in our present subject is, to convey any given quantity of weight between two points at the least possible expense.[...] In order to retain a perfectly smooth and hard surface, unencumbered with extraneous obstacles to which the rails near the ground are exposed, it appeared desirable to elevate the surface from the reach of those obstacles and at the same time be released from the impediments occasioned by snows in the winter season."

The first horse-powered elevated monorail started operating at Cheshunt on 25 June 1825. Although designed to transport materials, it was here used to carry passengers. In 1826 German railway pioneer Friedrich Harkort had a demonstration track of Palmer's system built by his steel factory in Elberfeld, one of the main towns in the early industrialised region of the Wupper Valley. Palmer's monorail can be regarded as the precursor of the Lartigue Monorail and of the Schwebebahn Wuppertal.

In his study, Palmer has one of the earliest descriptions of the principle of containerisation: "The arrangement also enables us to continue a conveyance by other means with very little interruption, as it is evident that the receptacles may be received from the one, and lodged on to another kind of carriage or vessel separately from the wheels and frame work, without displacing the goods".

== See also ==
- Ivan Elmanov

== Literature ==
- "Description of a Railway on a New Principle" - the study of Henry R. Palmer, London, 1823
