= Thomas Gray (1788–1848) =

British railway advocate

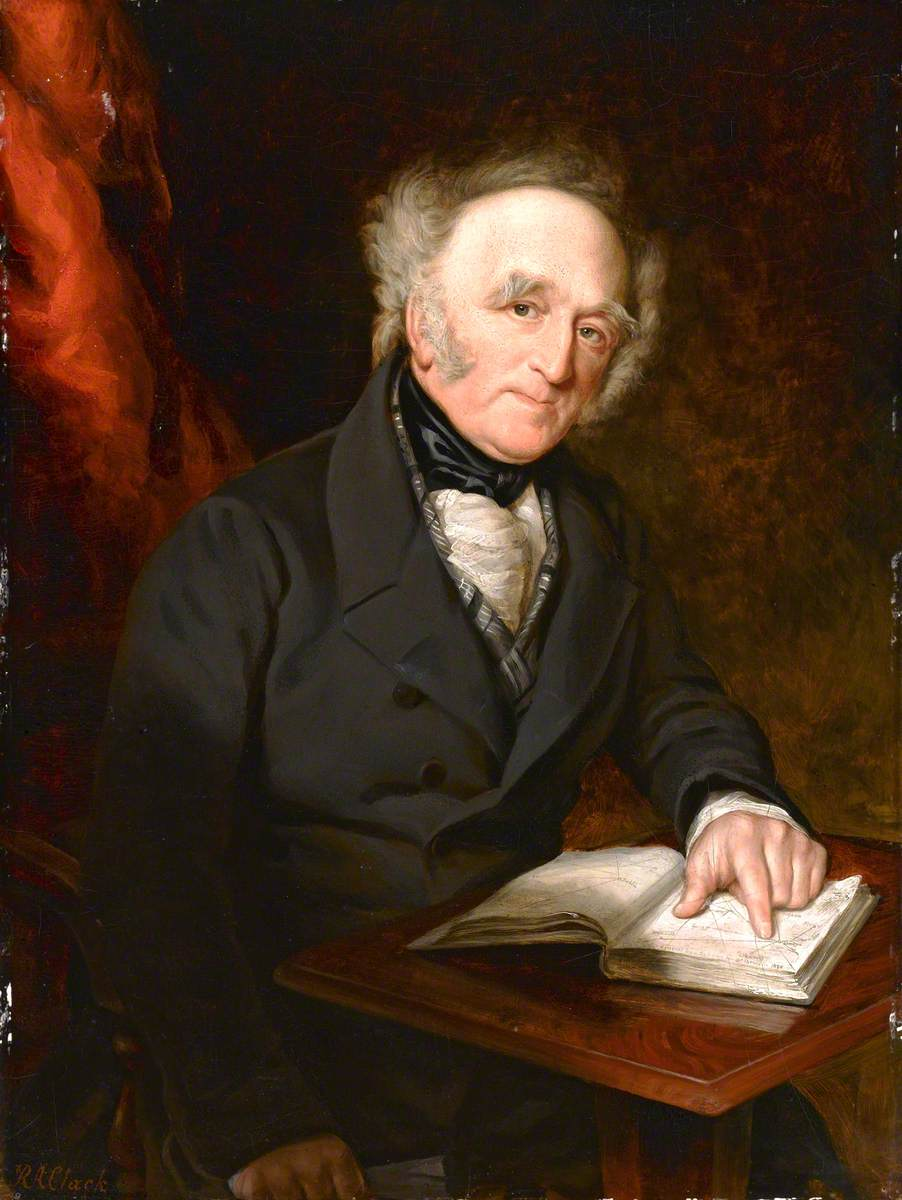
Portrait by Richard Augustus Clack, 1884

Thomas Gray (1788–1848) was a British railway advocate.

Thomas Gray spent most of his adult life promoting the idea of a passenger railway system for the UK and Europe. He wrote "Observations on a General Iron Railway" which was first published in 1820, followed by further, and expanded, editions up to 1825. Copies of the book are in the British Library and many more in UK and US libraries in differing editions. There was at least one US library that still offered it on loan to the general public in 2005.

He was a contemporary of William James, the Stephensons and Isambard Kingdom Brunel, all considered by many to be "Fathers of the Railways".

It is very likely, as indicated by the sequence of events after his first edition, that Gray's first published proposals directly and significantly influenced the writings and actions of William James and the Stephensons, among many others, when they began to design and build the earliest passenger railway system in Britain. Much as today, commercial interests over-rode "the good of the community", that underpinned Gray's advocacy of a General (National) Passenger Railway, to be funded jointly by Government and Capital(ists).

Thomas Gray, to this day, has been given little credit for the enormous contribution made by his work to the initiation and growth of passenger railway systems, throughout the world.

The Belgians, second only to Britain in terms of their industrial expansion in the 19th century, saw the sense of Gray's proposals and built an integrated transport system from scratch on the basis of his publication. They, at least, recognised his contribution, eventually, naming the Rue Gray in Brussels after him. It passes under a railway bridge.

== Published works ==
- Gray, Thomas (1825). Observations on a General Iron Rail-way, Or Land Steam-conveyance: To Supersede the Necessity of Horses in All Public Vehicles: Showing Its Vast Superiority in Every Respect, Over All the Present Pitiful Methods of Conveyance by Turnpike Roads, Canals, and Coasting-traders. Containing Every Species of Information Relative to Rail-roads and Loco-motive Engines. Baldwin, Cradock, and Joy.
