= Egide Walschaerts =

Belgian mechanical engineer (1820–1901)

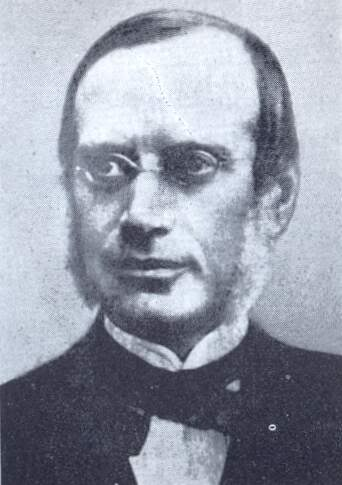
- Born: 21 January 1820; Mechelen, Belgium
- Died: 18 February 1901 (aged 81); Saint-Gilles, Belgium
- Engineering career
- Discipline: Mechanical engineering

Egide Walschaerts (21 January 1820 – 18 February 1901) was a Belgian mechanical engineer, best known as the inventor of the Walschaerts valve gear used in steam locomotives. He was born in Mechelen, Belgium. In 1838 he was recognised as an excellent modeller, presenting his work at a local exhibition in Mechelen. Minister Rogier, who opened the exhibition, was so impressed that he arranged a place for Walschaerts at Liège University.

== Career ==
In 1842 he joined the Belgian State Railways and two years later had reached the rank of foreman. He was made chief superintendent of the works shortly after but mysteriously, for such a meteoric early career, never rose any higher. He held this position for the rest of his life, first at Mechelen and then at Brussels South.

=== Walschaerts valve gear ===
Whilst at Mechelen in 1844 he developed a new type of valve gear: a mechanism that allows for adjustment of the travel of the valves that distribute the steam to the cylinders and enables a steam locomotive to be put into reverse and to economise steam. He was not permitted by the company to patent the device himself as he was deemed of too lowly a rank. An engineer colleague and friend, M. Fisher, applied for the patent on his behalf but never claimed any contribution to it. Walschaerts's name on the documents erroneously omitted the final 's' causing confusion over its correct spelling over the succeeding years. A locomotive built at the Tubize workshops fitted with the Walschaerts valve gear was awarded a gold medal at the 1873 Universal Exhibition in Vienna. This valve gear came to be used in the majority of steam locomotives, and became almost universal throughout the 20th Century.

=== Other innovations ===
According to Payen, in 1874 Walschaerts developed a particularly successful version of the Corliss stationary engine that won a gold medal at the 1878 Exposition Universelle in Paris.

=== Commemoration ===
Both of the municipalities in which he worked have named streets after him: Mechelen and St Gillis/St-Gilles in Brussels (Egide is a form of the name Giles).
