= Lifeline Express China =

Medical charity in China that operates hospital trains

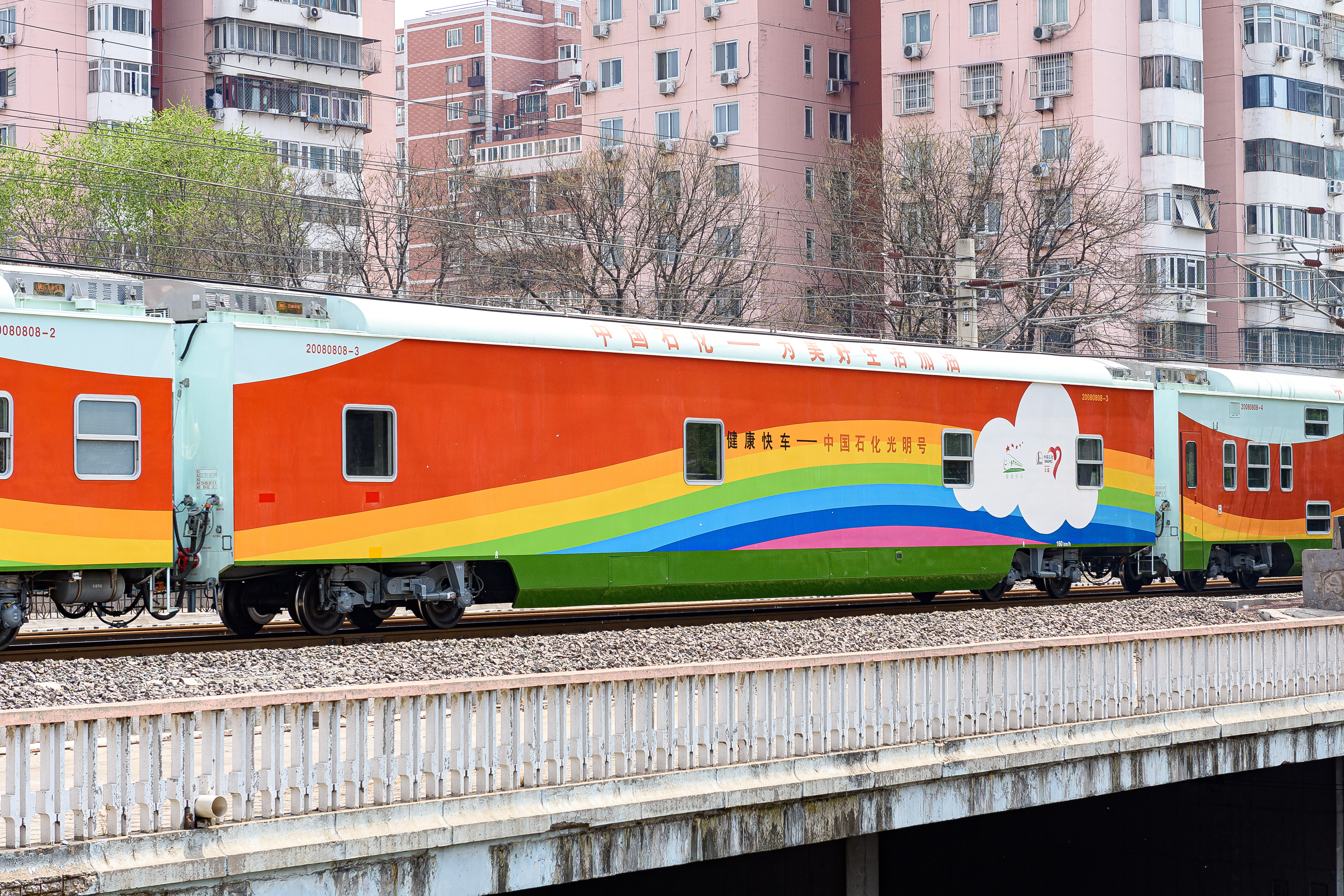
The operation carriage of Lifeline Express

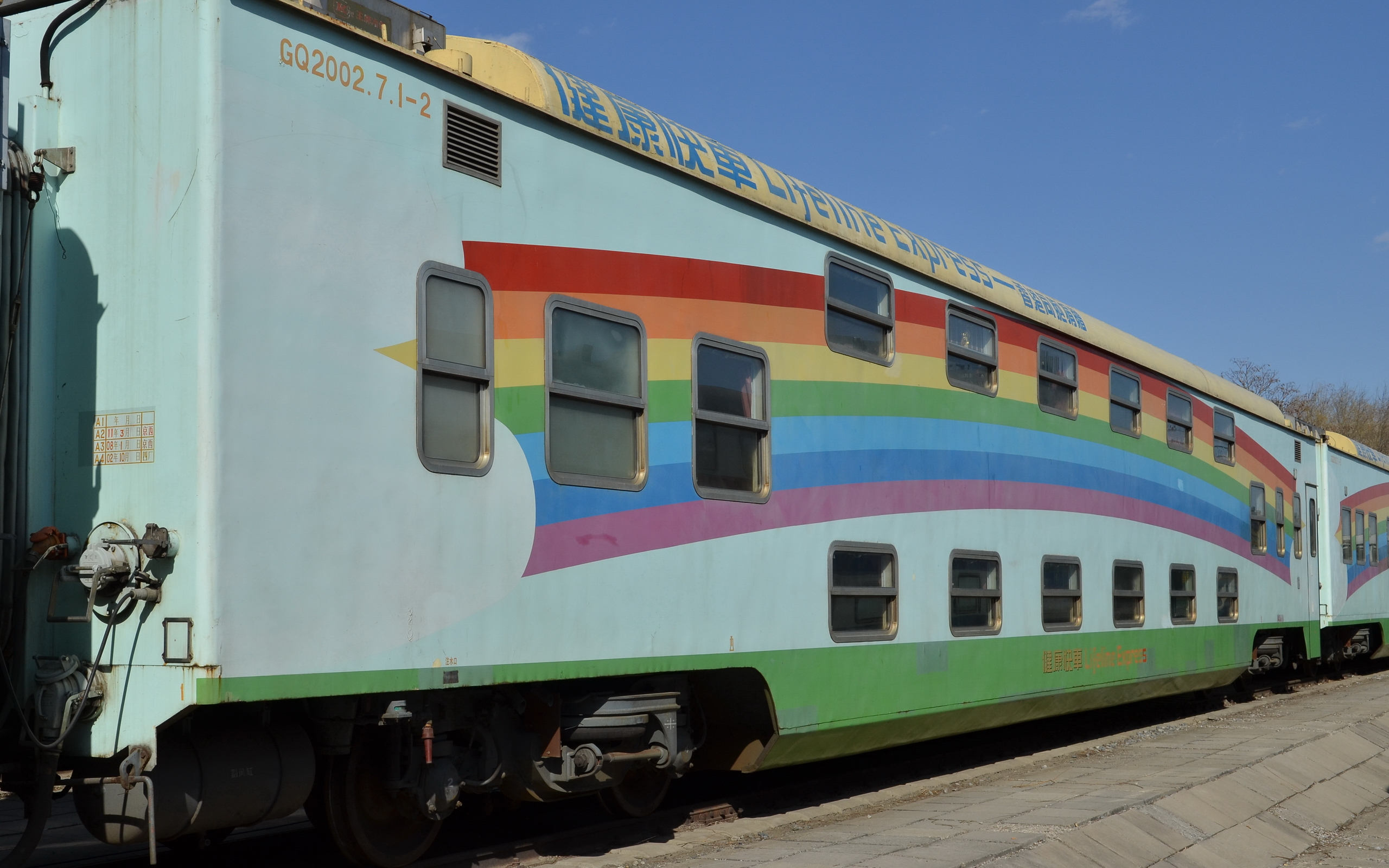
Lifeline Express coach

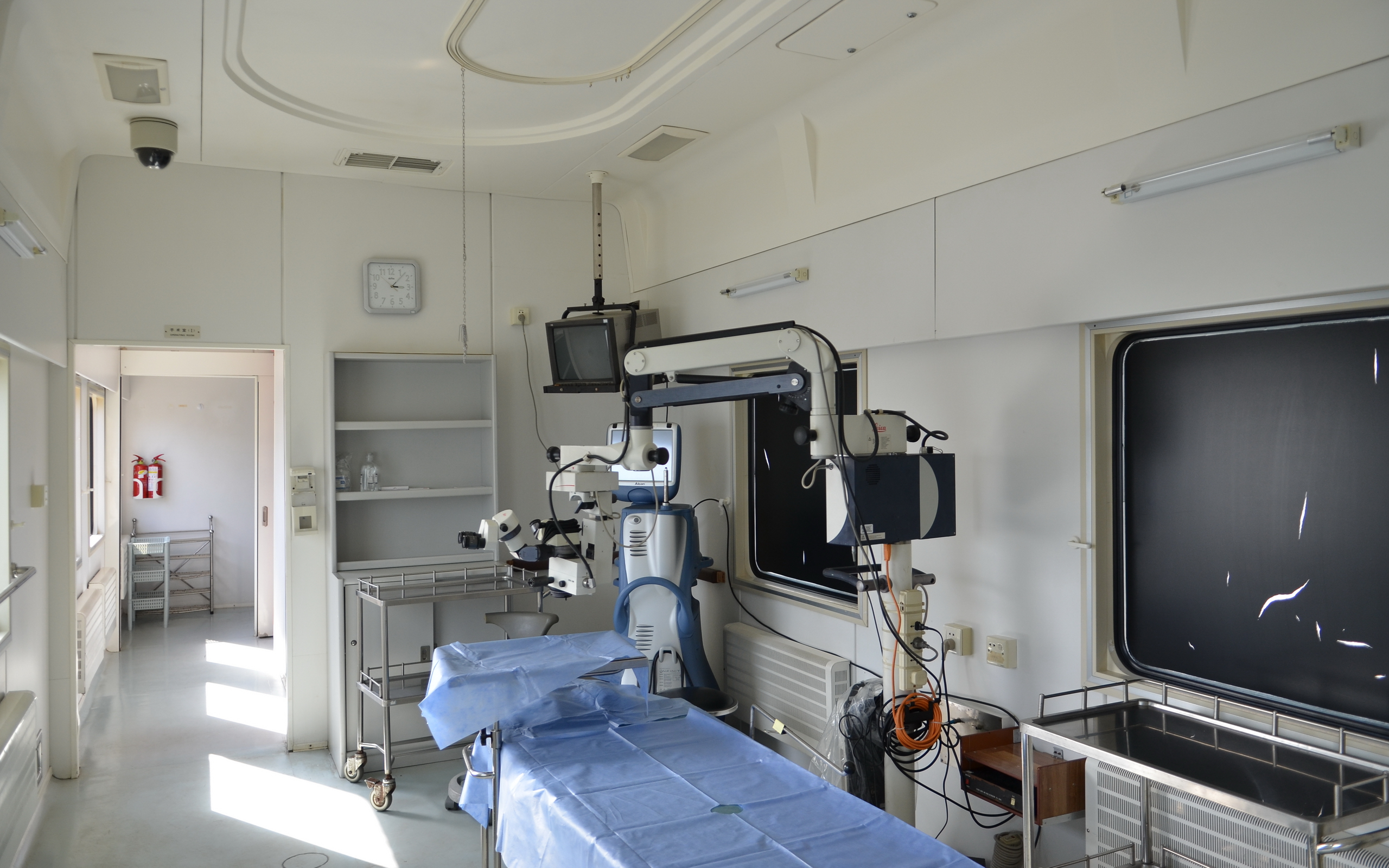
Inside Lifeline Express

Lifeline Express is a charitable organization that attempts to reduce blindness in China. Since 1997, the organization has operated rainbow-coloured hospital "Eye-Trains," which provide free cataract surgery to patients in rural parts of China. In addition, Lifeline Express promotes ophthalmological training for Chinese doctors, through constructing training centers and inviting foreign doctors to China as consultants, and builds solar hot water systems in remote parts of China.

The development of Lifeline Express is supported by the Ministry of Health, Ministry of Railways and Hong Kong and Macao Affairs Office. It is funded by Lifeline Express Hong Kong Foundation, Lifeline Express China Foundation and the general public.

== Mission ==
Lifeline Express restores sight to the cataract patients in rural China. The Ministry of Health estimates that 1 million cataract patients remain uncured, with an increase of 500,000 new cases every year. There has been an increase in the number of young people in remote areas suffering from cataracts due to unsatisfactory hygiene conditions and demanding physical labor; and, more and more cases are diagnosed as genetically inherited. Lifeline Express brings back sight to cataract sufferers, allowing them to start working in the fields again and helps poverty-stricken areas to expand the work force, thus improving workers' livelihoods. While working on the eye-train, doctors are trained for future medical development.

== History ==
This organisation has replicated the Lifeline Express, created in India by the Impact India Foundation. In 1996, Impact India came to Hong Kong to raise funds for this work. Some of the individuals they approached for support quickly saw the potential for mounting a similar operation on China's mainland. A group of Hong Kong philanthropists visited India to see the Lifeline Express in action and then discussed the idea with China's Ministry of Public Health. Celebrating Hong Kong's transfer of sovereignty to China, Nellie Fong Wong Kut-Man, the Founding Chairman of Lifeline Express Hong Kong Foundation, together with 20 other Founding Trustees, raised the capital for the first eye-train. On 1 July 1997, the first eye-train started its first journey of vision in China.

In 2002, the Chinese Foundation for Lifeline Express was established and widened the network of sponsorship.

== Service ==
=== Eye-train ===
Over the past decade, the eye-trains of Lifeline Express have visited over 27 Chinese provinces, cities and autonomous regions and cured more than 100,000 cataract patients in remote and poverty-stricken areas of China. Lifeline Express' hospital trains visit 12 locations and perform over 11,000 surgeries each year. Trains remain at each location for three months, performing 25 free eye operations every day for a total of about 1,500 patients having their eyesight restored at each stop.

The first eye-train was launched in 1997, the second in 1999, the third in 2002, and the fourth in 2009.

There are 12 team members on each train, including doctors, nurses, engineering technician and administrative staff recruited from mainland hospitals. The travel and stay on each eye-train running the daily operations. Volunteer ophthalmologists from Hong Kong and around the world often spend their vacations on the trains to help perform surgeries.

There are four compartments on each eye-train. Each train carries its own medical equipment and eye-care technology. Other facilities are also available on the train:

- Consultation clinic
- Sanitization room
- 2 Operating rooms
- Recovery room
- Multi-function conference room
- Living quarters for medical and other staff

=== Microscopic Eye Surgery Training Centre ===
Lifeline Express has set up 12 Microscopic Eye Surgery Centres to train eye-doctors in China. The Centres are equipped with the latest surgical equipment and eye-care technology. Its ultimate goal is to set up centres in every province the eye-train visits, namely the less-developed, remote provinces. Doctors can receive training and sit for the global exam host by the International Council of Ophthalmology.

=== Solar Hot Water System ===
In the past, many people living in remote areas of China could only bath in ponds during summers, and often could not bath in the cold water during fierce winters. Hygiene condition deteriorated and diseases raged. In 2006, Lifeline Express started a new project in China: building solar hot water systems for the rural schools to supply hot water for village students.

== Awards ==
Year	Organization	Award
2005	State Council National Award-Issuing Ceremony on Ethnic Unity and Progress	National Award on Enhancing Ethnic Unity and Progress
2005	China Charity Federation, Ministry of Civil Affairs of PRC	China Charity Award
2006	The State Council Leading Group Office of Poverty Alleviation and Development	China Poverty Eradication Award
2008	China Charity Federation, Ministry of Civil Affairs of PRC	China Charity Award

== See also ==
- List of charities in China
- List of NGOs in China
- Railway surgery
