= Ivan Elmanov =

Russian inventor

Ivan Kirillovich Elmanov (Russian: Иван Кириллович Эльманов) was a Russian inventor. During 1820, in Myachkovo, near Moscow, he built a type of monorail described as a road on pillars. The single rail was made of timber balks resting above the pillars. The wheels were set on this wooden rail, while the horse-drawn carriage had a sled on its top. This construction is considered to be the first known monorail in the world.

== See also ==
- Henry Robinson Palmer
- List of Russian inventors
