= James Beatty (engineer) =

Irish railway engineer (1820–1856)

James Beatty (31 March 1820 – 11 March 1856) was an Irish railway engineer.

The son of a medical doctor from Enniskillen, Beatty was first employed in 1842 at the age of 22 by Peto and Betts on building the Norwich and Lowestoft line. In 1853 he was in Nova Scotia surveying the European and North American Railway and despite adverse weather conditions, the line was staked out in good time. Towards the end of 1854 he was appointed by Peto, Brassey and Betts as Chief Engineer of the Grand Crimean Central Railway, built to convey supplies to the Allied forces in the Crimean War. He arrived in Balaklava in January 1855 to join Donald Campbell and his team who had already started to survey the line. Beatty's energy and enthusiasm ensured that the line, which included a stretch at a gradient of 1 in 14, was laid in a very short time.

In April, Beatty was involved in an accident on the line when a train went out of control. He sustained an injury which appeared originally not to be serious but he never fully recovered from it. With the railway substantially complete in November he was still far from well and he left for England. His condition continued to deteriorate and he died in March 1856 at the age of 35 from an aortic aneurysm which was possibly the result of the accident. His widow was awarded a pension equivalent to that of a colonel dying on active service.
