= Grand Crimean Central Railway =

British military railway during the Crimean War

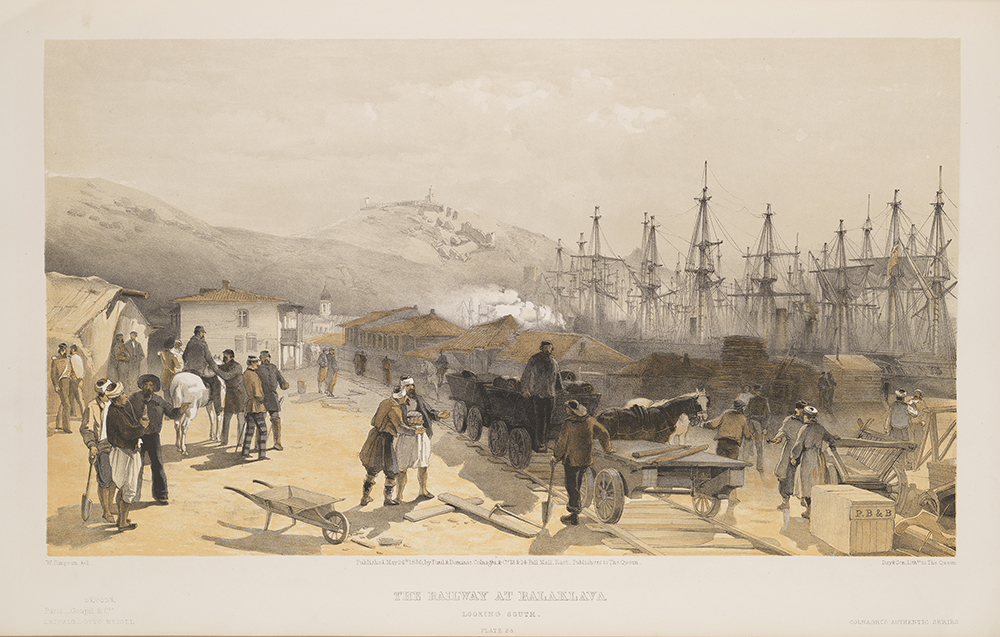
- Main street of Balaclava showing the railway, painting by William Simpson (Note: The initials "P. B. & B." (bottom right) allude to Peto, Betts and Brassey, the contractors.)

Overview
- Headquarters: Balaklava
- Locale: Crimea, Russian Empire (Allied occupation zone)
- Dates of operation: 1855–1856

Technical
- Track gauge: 1,435 mm (4 ft 8 1/2 in)
- Length: 14 miles (23 km)

The Grand Crimean Central Railway was a military railway built in 1855 during the Crimean War by the United Kingdom. Its purpose was to supply ammunition and provisions to Allied soldiers engaged in the Siege of Sevastopol who were stationed on a plateau between Balaklava and Sevastopol. It also carried the world's first hospital train.

The railway was built at cost and without any contract by Peto, Brassey and Betts, a partnership of English railway contractors led by Samuel Morton Peto. Within three weeks of the arrival of the fleet carrying materials and men the railway had started to run and in seven weeks 7 miles (11 km) of track had been completed. The railway was a major factor leading to the success of the siege. After the end of the war the track was sold and removed.

== Origins ==
=== Background ===
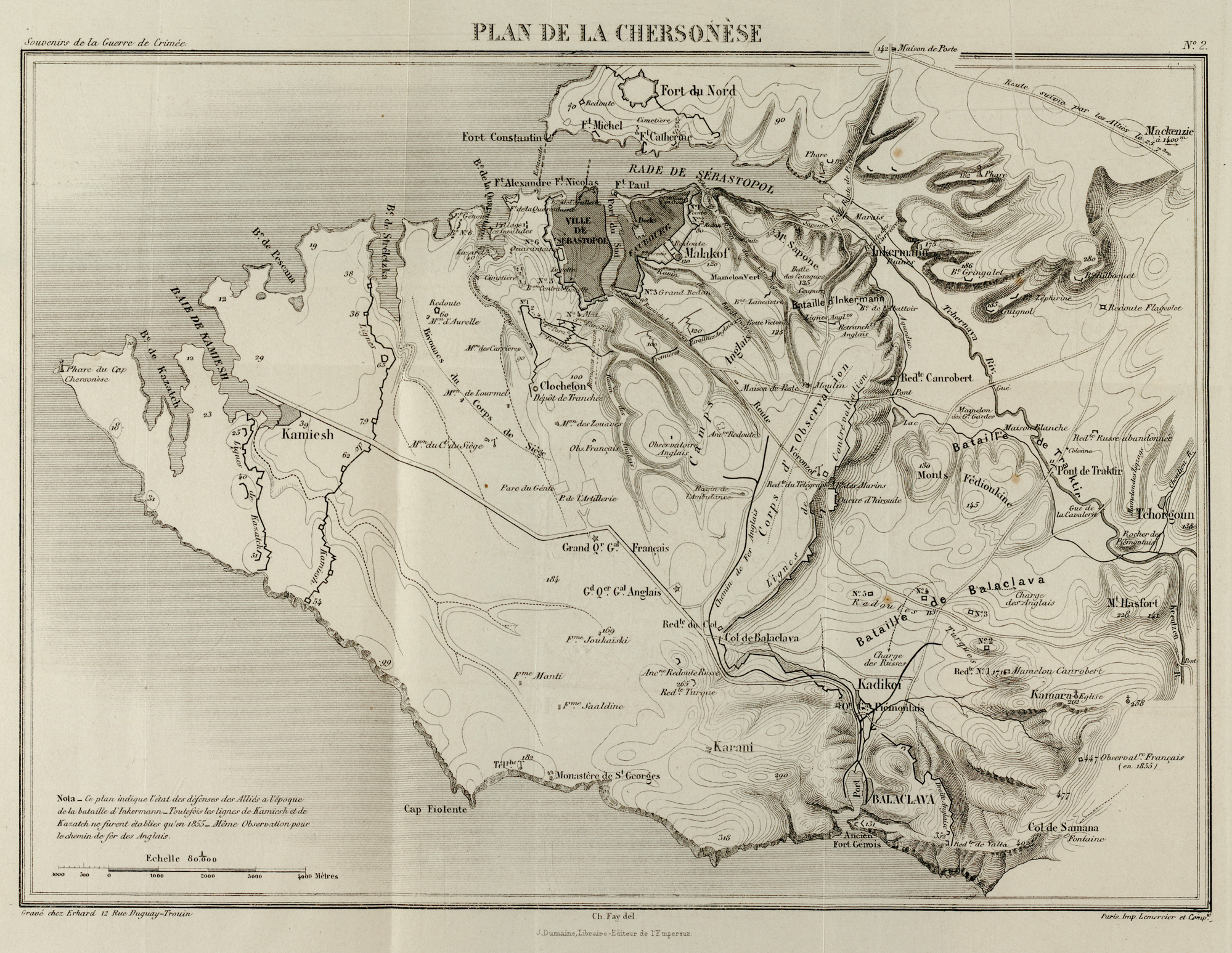
Shown as "Chemin de Fer Anglais" on a contemporary French army map

Britain and France declared war on Russia on 28 March 1854 in support of the Ottoman Empire. By the late summer of 1854 the British, led by Lord Raglan, with their French and Turkish allies decided that a siege of the Black Sea port of Sevastopol, held by the Russians, would be the best method of forcing an end to the war.

After landing their forces to the north of Sevastopol, the British set up a base in the narrow harbour of Balaclava, about 8 miles (13 km) south of Sevastopol, in September 1854. (Note: The allies' route to the south is shown as Route suivie par les Allies le 25 7bre in the north-east corner of the accompanying French military map (above).) Most of the land between Balaclava and Sevastopol was a plateau about 600 feet (183 m) above sea level. The towns were connected by a road which was little more than a track. This travelled northwards, rising slightly to the village of Kadikoi about 1 mile (2 km) from Balaclava. It then turned west, climbing steeply to the plateau via the Col of Balaclava. The French were supplied from the harbour at Kamiesch.

During the early part of October, the British troops with their supplies and artillery made their way with difficulty up the road to prepare for the siege. When they were all in place the First Bombardment took place, starting on October 17. It had been expected that the bombardment would be effective and that the siege would be short-lived; certainly over before the winter. However, the Russians blew up one of the French magazines and the damage done by British gunfire was soon repaired. The British were running out of ammunition and supplies, winter was approaching and with the onset of bad weather the road became virtually impassable. Supplies were arriving at the crowded port of Balaclava but it was impossible to convey them to the besieging troops who were increasingly suffering from disease, frostbite and malnutrition. Conditions in Balaclava itself were also deteriorating.

=== Planning and contractors ===
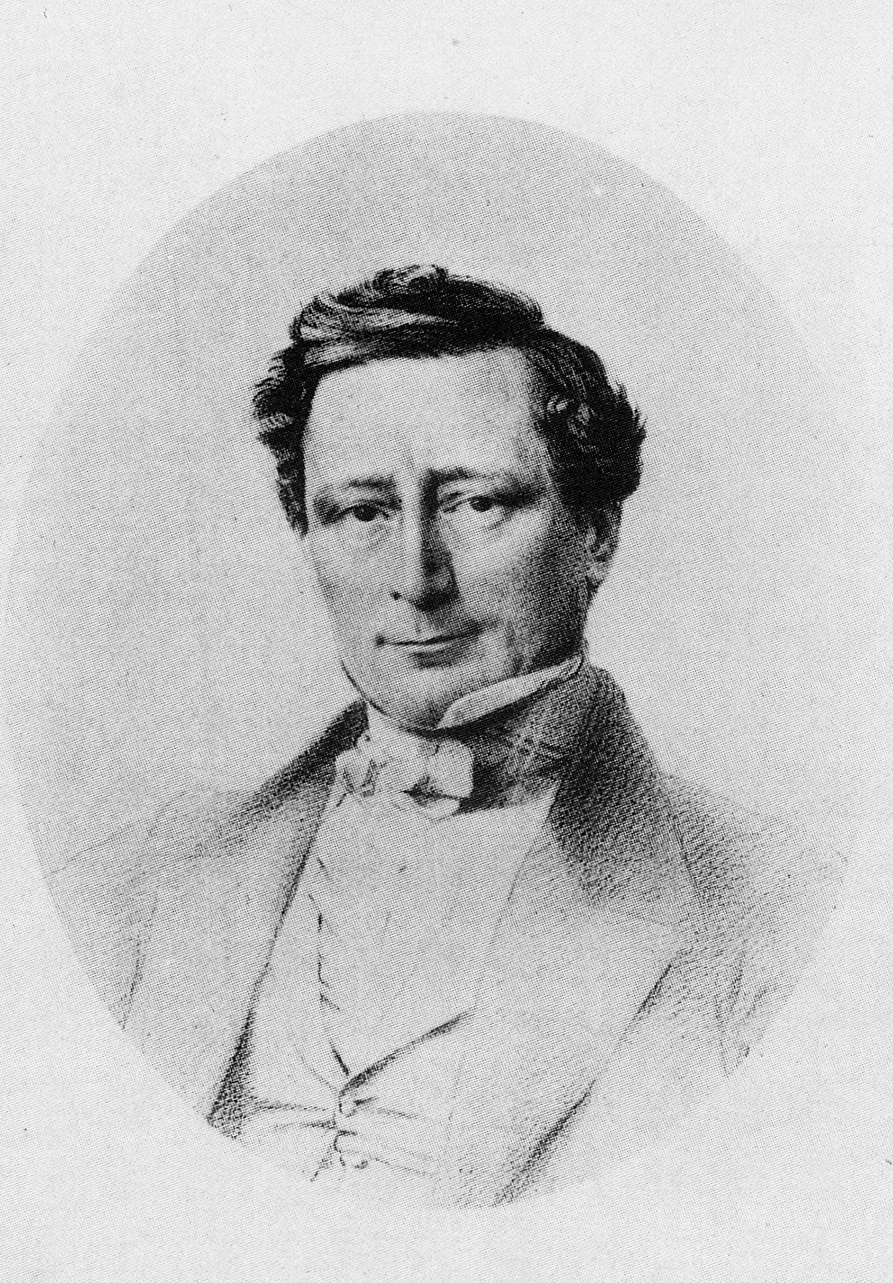
Samuel Morton Peto

News of these conditions was relayed to Britain, mainly by William Howard Russell, special correspondent of The Times. Hearing the news, Samuel Morton Peto, one of the leading railway contractors of the day, offered with his partners Edward Betts and Thomas Brassey, to build at cost, without any contract or personal advantage, a railway to transport supplies from the port of Balaclava to the troops outside Sevastopol. They promised to have a railroad at work in three weeks after landing at Balaclava. The offer was accepted and the contractors began to obtain supplies, to purchase or hire ships and to recruit the men, who included specialists and navvies. The enterprise was officially formed under the title of The Civil Engineering Corps and the Treasury offered an advance payment for initial expenses of £44,524 (equivalent to £4,270,000 in 2025). The vessels engaged to carry the railway material and men consisted of seven steam and two sailing ships, of the aggregate tonnage of 5491 tons, and 900-horse power, as follows - "Lady Alice Lambton," screw-steamer, 511 tons, 90-horse power; "Great Northern," ditto, 578 tons, 90-horse; "Earl of Durham," ditto, 554 tons, 90-horse; Baron von Humboldt," ditto, 420 tons, 60-horse; " Hesperus," ditto. 800 tons, 150-horse; " Prince of Wales," ditto, 627 tons, 120-horse; "Levant," paddle-steamer, 694 tons, 500-horse power; "Wildfire," clipper sailing ship, 457 tons; Mohawk," ditto, 850 tons. The material consisted of 1800 tons of rails and fastenings, 6000 sleepers, 600 loads timber, and about 3000 tons of other material and machinery, consisting of fixed engines, cranes, pile engines, trucks, wagons, barrows, blocks, chain- falls, wire-rope, picks, bars, capstans, crabs, and a variety of other plant and tools; besides sawing machines, forges, carpenters' and smiths' tools, &c. This material was distributed over the different vessels in such a manner that should any one or two vessels be lost disabled, it will not endanger the efficiency of the whole. The ships convey, in parties of 50 or 80, 500 workmen; each party under a charge of a foreman and assistant; as well as a surgeon to each vessel.

The fleet set sail on December 21 and arrived at the beginning of February.

Meanwhile, James Beatty, who had played an important part in working with Peto's partnership to build the European and North American Railway, was recruited as chief engineer. The line was surveyed by Donald Campbell, who had also worked on the European and North American Railway. Campbell's first task was to create a wharf at Balaclava where the railway materials could be unloaded, with a yard adjacent. He planned for the track to pass along the middle of the main street of the town. It then went through a gorge at the north of the town close to the water's edge and over swampy ground to the village of Kadikoi. From here, the railway had to rise some 500 feet (152 m) to the top of the plateau. Of the routes available, Campbell chose to follow the existing road. Although at parts its gradient was as steep as 1 in 7, Campbell managed find a route with a maximum gradient of 1 in 14. A stationary engine would be required at the top of this stretch to pull the railway carriages up the incline. Once on the plateau, the ground was rough but fairly level and here it presented fewer problems. Lord Raglan's headquarters were at the top of the col, and it was decided that a depot should be constructed here.

=== Construction ===
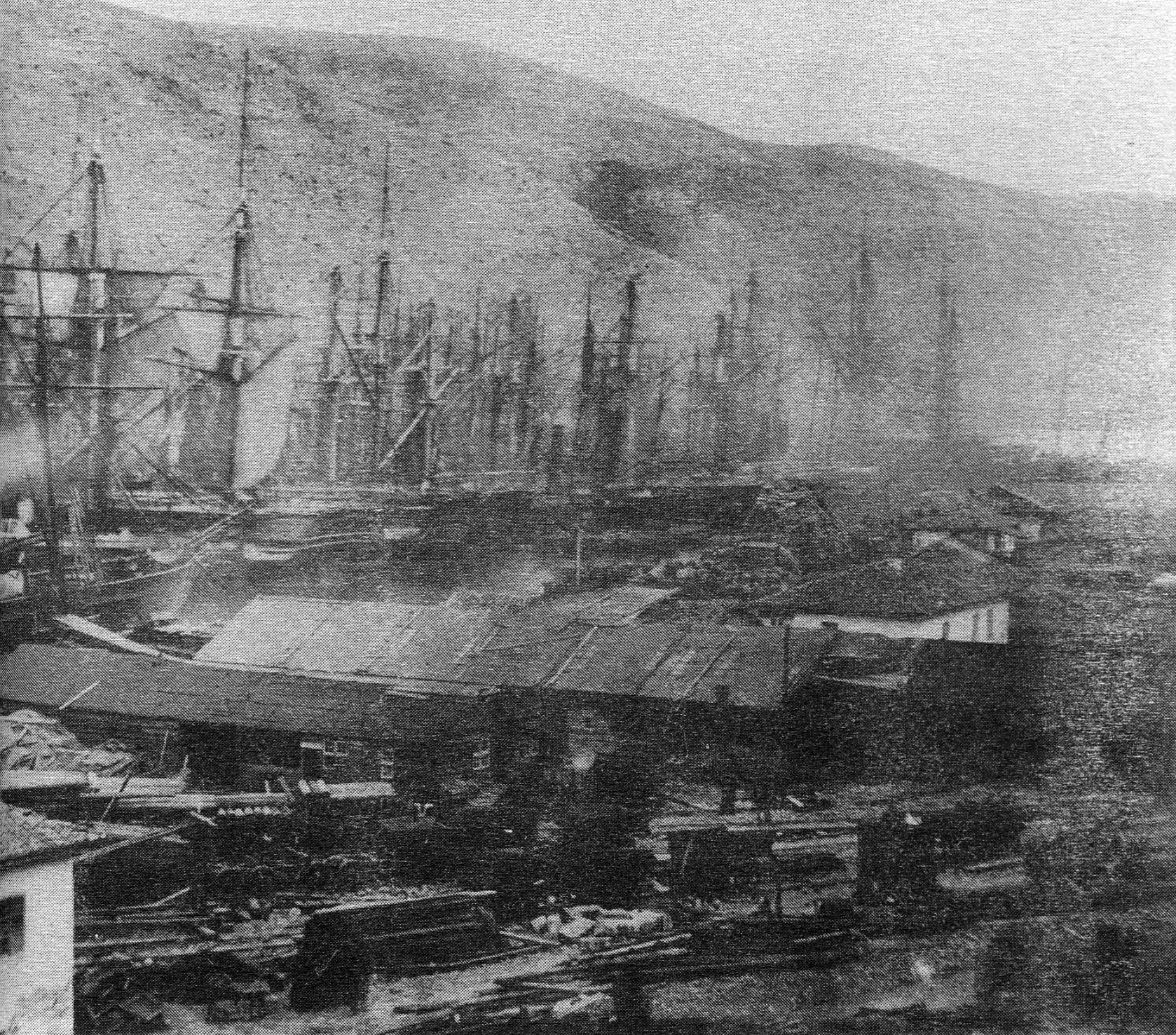
Railway yard at Balaclava. Photograph by Roger Fenton

Beatty started work on 19 January 1855, and by 8 February the navvies were laying the first rails in the main street of Balaclava. A trial assembly of the stationary engines (two had been acquired in case of the failure of one of them) was made and on February 10 they were working. By the 13th, the railway had reached a point 300 yards (274 m) from the town and on the 19th it was at Kadikoi. It began to function on the 23rd when horse-drawn supplies were taken from Balaclava to Kadikoi. This was 15 days after starting to lay the first rails and about three weeks after the arrival of the fleet in the port. The railway yard in Balaclava was being extended and accommodation was being built for the workers and for storage of materials. By March 26 the line was complete to the top of the col and the first load was taken to the headquarters depot. By this time, the line had been double tracked from Balaclava to Kadikol and various sidings had been constructed near the wharf. In less than seven weeks 7 miles (11 km) of track had been laid. During this time the pioneer photographer Roger Fenton had arrived and he recorded the railway and its progress.

== Operational history ==
=== Initial impact ===
On 2 April the railway was used to carry the sick and injured from the plateau down to Balaclava. It has been argued that this was the first hospital train ever to run. Also during this time, Colonel William McMurdo had been appointed to be in charge of a new department of the army, the Land Transport Corps. He arrived in the Crimea in early March, and one of his duties was to take over the operation of the railway from the contractors. Felix Wakefield was given the temporary rank of lieutenant-colonel and he arrived to take command of the Army Works Corps employed on the project. It was finally handed over by Peto, Brassey and Betts in early July.

The existence of the railway meant that sufficient supplies and armaments had been transported to the plateau for the allies to resume their attack. The Second Bombardment started on April 9 and continued for ten days. Initially, little progress seemed to have been made because again the Russians were able to repair the damage caused, and the Russians continued to deliver supplies to Sevastopol from the north. However, they had sustained heavy casualties. Following a period of stalemate, Allied forces cut off one of the main Russian supply lines at Kerch on May 24.

The increased supply of ammunition meant that the Allies were able to mount the Third Bombardment on 6 June. This was much more intensive than the previous ones. It was followed by an assault on the 7th and 8th, which met with a limited degree of success. More supplies were brought by the railway and the Fourth Bombardment took place on June 17. The subsequent attack was mismanaged and was a failure.

=== End of the siege ===
The Russians suffered a significant defeat at the Battle of the Tchernaya on August 16. The Fifth Bombardment took place for five days from the 17th with the intention of destroying as many Russian defence works as possible. The Sixth Bombardment was followed by a successful Allied attack on September 8, bringing the siege to an end two days later.

During the summer, further surveys had been carried out with the intention of supplying not just the British forces, but also their French and Sardinian allies (Sardinia had joined the war towards the end of 1854) by rail from Balaclava. At this time electric telegraphy by underwater cable was first used in warfare, connecting the Crimea to the Allies' base at Varna in Bulgaria.

=== Locomotives and additional lines ===
Locomotives were used, the first one running by November 8, but this was too late to affect the outcome of the siege. The locomotives were not effective because they could not manage even the easy gradient from Balaclava to Kadikoi with more than a light load. Five second-hand locomotives, purchased by the contractors from collieries and railway companies in England, are known to have arrived. Alliance and Victory were two small 0-6-0 saddle tanks built by E. B. Wilson & Co of Leeds in 1854/5; two from the London & North Western Railway, Nos 13 and 50, were 2-2-0 Bury-type passenger engines built by Benjamin Hick & Son of Bolton in 1838 and 1840; the fifth locomotive was Swan from the St Helens Canal & Railway Co, but its details remain obscure.

James Beatty left the Crimea in November to return to England, a sick man, and Donald Campbell took over. Earlier in September Her Majesty's Floating Factory Chasseur arrived at Balaclava to provide an engineering service under the direction of Robert Frazer. A third stationary engine also arrived. Due to the haste in which the railway had been constructed, it was in danger of being severely damaged by the weather of the coming winter. William Doyne organised the building of new lines of a superior quality, again in a short time. By November 10, 6.5 miles (10 km) of track had been laid between Balaclava and the British headquarters. The lines towards the Sardinian and French headquarters were also advancing.

=== Remainder of the war and closure ===
Towards and during the second winter, the supplies carried by the railway were different. The siege had ended, carriage of ammunition was less important, and the supplies related more to the accommodation and comfort of the troops. These included huts to replace tents, clothing, food, books and medical supplies. Colonel McMurdo also left the Crimea as a sick man on December 1, passing the control of the railway to Colonel Edward Wetherall. Following the completion of the Sardinian branch, the railway had reached its limit. In all, it measured about 14 miles (23 km) plus a few miles of sidings and loops.

Sevastopol lay in ruins after the end of the siege. Tsar Nicholas I died on 2 March 1855, and peace negotiations were opened by his successor Alexander II. Hostilities ended between the Allies and the Russians on 29 February 1856 and the Treaty of Paris was signed on 30 March 1856. The Russians sold the track to the Turks soon after the war ended. The rails had already been uprooted and taken away, and the railway ceased to exist.

== Argentina myth ==
A discounted legend claims that two steam engines from the Crimean line went on to a new life on the newly started Buenos Ayres Western Railway in Argentina. According to the myth this is reason many railways in Argentina were built to 1,676 mm (5 ft 6 in), which the builders of the Grand Crimean Central Railway had supposedly chosen as it enabled them to requisition for use in Crimea available engines and rolling stock which had already been built for lines in India. Research in the 1950s showed that this story is untenable. Contemporary information shows that the Crimean railway was standard gauge, despite subsequent rumours that it was 5'3" Irish gauge or 1,676 mm (5 ft 6 in), while Argentina's neighbour Chile had already adopted 5'6" gauge. The works number of the two Argentine steam engines, N°1 "La Porteña" (on display at the Provincial Transport Museum in Luján,) and N°2 "La Argentina", show that they left manufacturer E. B. Wilson and Company of Leeds in 1856, after the demolition of the Crimea railway had already begun. Their dimensions and characteristics would have been unsuitable for the steep gradients in Balaclava, and technical considerations would have prevented their conversion from standard to broad gauge.

On the other hand contemporary reports claim that engines from the GCCR went to Argentina, then on to Paraguay after the end of the Triple Alliance War; see for instance Sir Richard Burton who mentions in his "Letters From the Battlefields of Paraguay" (1870) that the train he travelled in was pulled by an "asthmatic little engine—which, after serving its time upon the Balaklava line, and being condemned as useless at Buenos Aires, had been shipped off to Paraguay" there is also another mention of an engine that had seen service in the Crimean War in the book "Letters" by Freund and Mulhall in 1887, quoted by Gaylord Harris Warren in his book "Paraguay and the Triple Alliance"
