= Myachkovo, Moscow Oblast =

Myachkovo Мя́чково
- Village (selo)
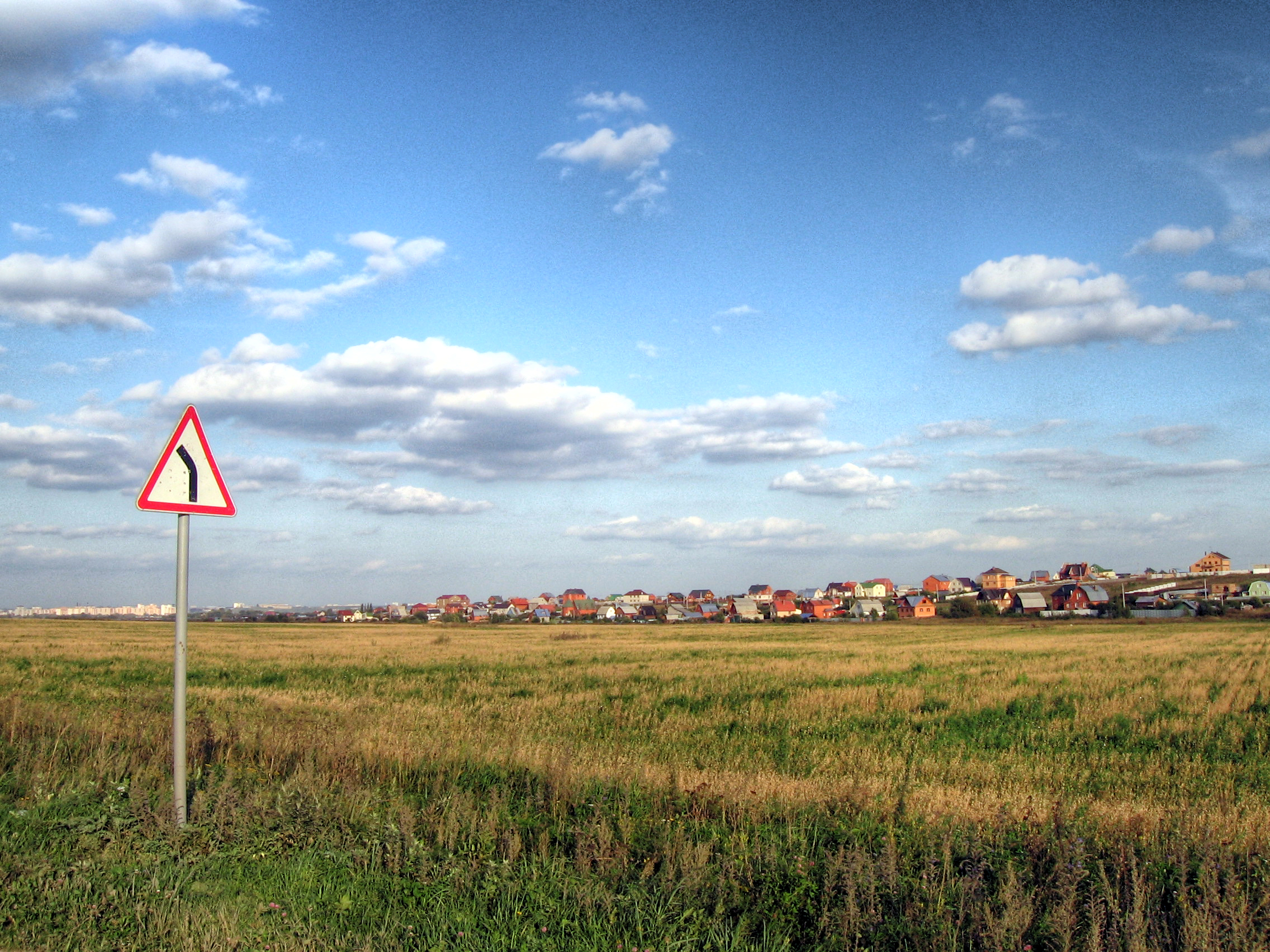
- Myachkovo, 2006

- Location within Russia
- Coordinates: 55°32′56″N 37°58′38″E
- Country: Russia
- Federal Subject: Moscow Oblast
- District: Ramensky District
- Time zone: UTC+3 (MSK)

Myachkovo (Russian: Мя́чково) is a village (selo) in Ramensky District of Moscow Oblast, Russia, located near the mouth of the Pakhra River flowing into the Moskva River. It is the site of Bykovo railway station.

The surrounding region contains large quantities of carboniferous limestone with inclusions of mineral shells, corals, and sea lilies (encrinites).

The village is home to Myachkovo Airport and Autodrom Moscow circuit.
