= List of English people =

Flag of England (St George's Cross)

Listed below are English people of note and some notable individuals born in England.

== Archaeologists and anthropologists ==
- George Adamson (1906–1989)
- Leslie Alcock (1925–2006), archaeologist of the medieval period
- Mary Anning (1799–1847), palaeontologist
- Ella Sophia Armitage (1841–1931)
- Mick Aston (1946–2013), archaeologist of the medieval period
- Richard Atkinson (1920–1994)
- Edward Russell Ayrton (1882–1914)
- Churchill Babington (1821–1889), archaeologist and classical scholar
- Philip Arthur Barker (1920–2001)
- Thomas Bateman (1821–1861)
- Margaret Benson (1865–1916), Egyptologist
- James Theodore Bent (1852–1897)
- Geoffrey Bibby (1917–2001), "Arabian" archaeologist
- Adela Breton (1849–1923), archaeological artist
- Howard Carter (1874–1939), Egyptologist
- Gertrude Caton Thompson (1888–1985)
- Grahame Clark (1907–1995)
- Mary Kitson Clark (1905–2005, archaeologist and curator
- David Clarke (1937–1976)
- Barry Cunliffe (born 1939), archaeologist and scholar
- John Disney (1779–1857), barrister and archaeologist
- Dina Portway Dobson-Hinton (1885–1968), archaeologist and caver
- E. E. Evans-Pritchard (1902–1973), social anthropologist
- Aileen Fox (1907–2005), archaeologist specialising in Roman forts
- Cyril Fox (1882–1967), archaeologist and museum director
- Dorothy Garrod (1892–1968), archaeologist and specialist in the Palaeolithic era
- William Greenwell (1820–1918), archaeologist and priest
- Phil Harding (born 1950), archaeologist and TV expert
- Margaret Ursula Jones (1916–2001), archaeologist specialising in the Anglo-Saxon period
- Kathleen Kenyon (1906–1978)
- John Leland (1502–1582), antiquary
- John Lubbock (1834–1913), banker, politician, naturalist and archaeologist
- John Robert Mortimer (1825–1911)
- Barbara Parker-Mallowan (1908–1993), archaeologist, Assyriologist and epigraphist
- Francis Pryor (born 1945), archaeologist specialising in the Bronze and Iron Ages
- Colin Renfrew (born 1937), archaeologist and paleolinguist
- Alice Roberts (born 1973), anatomist, osteoarchaeologist and anthropologist
- Andrew Sherratt (1946–2006)
- E.B. Tylor (1832–1917), anthropologist
- Mortimer Wheeler (1890–1976), archaeologist and museum director

== Architects ==
- Hubert Austin (1845–1915)
- Charles Barry (1795–1860), (Houses of Parliament)
- George Basevi (1794–1845)
- William Burges (1827–1881), architect and designer
- William Butterfield (1814–1900), leader in Gothic revival movement
- Rowland Carter (1875–1916)
- William Chambers (1723–1796) (Kew Gardens Pagoda and Somerset House)
- Thomas Edward Collcutt (1840–1924)
- James Cubitt (1836–1914)
- John Douglas (1830–1911)
- Sir Philip Dowson (1924–2014)
- Henry Flitcroft (1697–1769)
- Sir Norman Foster (born 1935)
- Alfred Gelder (1855–1941), architect and politician
- Philip Hardwick (1792–1870)
- Thomas Hardwick (1752–1829)
- James Harrison (1814–1866)
- Thomas Harrison (1744–1829)
- Nicholas Hawksmoor (1661–1736)
- Horace Jones (1819–1886) (Tower Bridge)
- Inigo Jones (1573–1652)
- Henry Keene (1726–1776)
- William Kent (c. 1685 – 1748), architect, landscape architect and furniture designer
- Edmund Kirby (1838–1920)
- Denys Lasdun (1914–2001)
- Thomas Lockwood (1830–1900)
- Edwin Lutyens (1869–1944)
- Hugh May (1621–1684)
- William Morris (1834–1896), architect and author
- Edna Mosley (1899–1954)
- John Nash (1752–1835) (Regent's Park, St. James's Park, Trafalgar Square)
- Henry Paley (1859–1946)
- Sir Joseph Paxton (1801–1865) (The Crystal Palace for The Great Exhibition, London)
- Thomas Mainwaring Penson (1818–1864)
- August Pugin (1812–1852) (Palace of Westminster)
- Anthony Salvin (1799–1881)
- George Gilbert Scott (1811–1878) (Albert Memorial, St Pancras Station)
- Giles Gilbert Scott (1880–1960) (Waterloo Bridge, also supervised rebuilding of House of Commons, London)
- Edmund Sharpe (1809–1877)
- John William Simpson (1858–1933)
- George Edmund Street (1824–1881)
- John Vanbrugh (1664–1726), Baroque architect (Blenheim Palace)
- Derek Walker (1929–2015)
- Alfred Waterhouse (1830–1905) (Natural History Museum, London)
- Aston Webb (1849–1930) (Buckingham Palace and Victoria and Albert Museum)
- Ernest Berry Webber (1896–1963)
- William Wilkins (1778–1839) (National Gallery, London)
- Sir Christopher Wren (1632–1723)
- James Wyatt (1746–1813)

== Artists ==
- Sophie Gengembre Anderson (1823–1903), painter
- James Andrews (1801–1876), botanical artist
- Richard Ansdell (1815–1885), painter
- Edith Arendrup (1846–1934), Painter and religious sister
- Banksy (born c. 1974), graffiti artist
- Walter Daniel Batley (1850–1936), painter
- Aubrey Beardsley (1872–1898), illustrator
- Albanis Beaumont (ca. 1755–1812), painter
- Suzzan Blac (born 1960), painter
- Sir Peter Blake (born 1932), pop artist
- William Blake (1757–1827), painter, poet
- Henry Charles Bryant (1835–1915), portrait and landscape artist
- Albin R. Burt (1783–1842), portrait painter
- Sir Anthony Caro (1924–2013), sculptor
- Anna Maria Charretie (1819–1875), miniature painter
- John Constable (1776–1837), landscape painter
- Frank Cadogan Cowper (1877–1958), artist
- John Henry Dell (1830–1888), landscape artist and illustrator
- Tracey Emin (born 1963), conceptual artist
- Thomas Gainsborough (1727–1788), painter
- Andy Goldsworthy (born 1956), sculptor (land art)
- Antony Gormley OBE RA (born 1950), sculptor
- James Henry Govier (1910–1974), painter, etcher and engraver
- Steven Harris (born 1975), cartoonist
- Thomas Hazlehurst (c. 1740 – c. 1821), miniature painter
- Dame Barbara Hepworth DBE (1903–1975), sculptor
- Jamie Hewlett (born 1968), comic book artist and designer
- Nicholas Hilliard (1547–1619), miniature painter
- Damien Hirst (born 1965), sculptor/ conceptual artist
- David Hockney (born 1937), painter
- Sir Howard Hodgkin (1932–2017), painter
- William Hogarth (1697–1764), painter, engraver
- Master Hugo (fl. c. 1130–c. 1150), illuminated manuscript artist active in Bury St Edmunds
- William Holman Hunt (1827–1910)
- Sir Edwin Landseer (1802–1873), animal painter
- Celia Levetus (1874–1936), illustrator
- Richard Long (born 1945), land artist
- Sir John Everett Millais (1829–1896), painter
- Henry Moore (1898–1986), sculptor
- William Morris (1834–1896)
- Lawrence Mynott (born 1954), illustrator, designer and portrait painter
- Chris Ofili (born 1968), painter
- George Passmore (born 1942), artist (Gilbert & George)
- Sir Joshua Reynolds (1723–1792), portrait painter
- Bridget Riley (born 1931), painter
- Dante Gabriel Rossetti (1828–1882), painter
- Sir Stanley Spencer (1891–1959), painter
- George Stubbs (1724–1806), painter
- Joseph Mallord William Turner (1775–1851), landscape and marine artist
- Flora Twort (1893–1985), painter
- Mark Wallinger (born 1959), conceptual artist
- Rachel Whiteread (born 1963), sculptor
- Joseph Wright of Derby (1734–1797), Enlightenment painter

== Broadcasters and presenters ==
- Kirstie Allsopp (1971), TV personality, presenter of property and craft shows
- Michael Aspel (born 1933), news anchor
- Richard Arnold (born 1969), TV presenter
- Sir David Attenborough (born 1926), naturalist and broadcaster
- Steve Backshall (born 1973), wildlife TV presenter
- Matt Baker (born 1977), TV presenter
- Richard Baker (1925–2018), broadcaster and newsreader
- Clare Balding (born 1971), sports TV presenter
- Zoe Ball (born 1970), TV and radio presenter
- Matt Barbet (born 1976), TV presenter
- Angellica Bell (born 1976), children's TV presenter
- Jay Blades (born 1970), TV presenter and furniture restorer
- Jackie Brambles (born 1967), TV and radio presenter
- Jeff Brazier (born 1979), TV presenter
- Fern Britton (born 1957), TV presenter and writer
- Neil Buchanan (born 1956), children's TV presenter
- Mike Bushell (born 1965), sports presenter
- Jon Champion (born 1965), sports commentator
- Nicki Chapman (born 1967), TV presenter and talent show judge
- Adrian Chiles (born 1967), TV presenter
- George Clarke (born 1974), architect and TV presenter
- Jeremy Clarkson (born 1960), TV presenter, broadcaster and writer
- Harry Corbett (1918–1989), TV puppeteer and creator of Sooty
- Fearne Cotton (born 1981), TV presenter
- Rosemary Conley (born 1946), broadcaster on health and fitness
- Simon Cowell (born 1959), TV personality, record producer
- Sara Cox (born 1974), radio presenter and DJ
- Tina Daheley (born 1981), TV and radio presenter
- Tess Daly (born 1969), TV presenter
- Anne Davies (born 1958), TV presenter
- Simon Dee (1935–2009), radio and TV presenter
- Cat Deeley (born 1976), TV presenter
- Katie Derham (born 1970), TV and radio presenter
- David Dickinson (born 1941), day time TV presenter
- David Dimbleby (born 1938), current affairs TV presenter
- Declan Donnelly (born 1975), TV presenter
- Scarlette Douglas (born 1987), TV presenter of property programmes
- Peter Duncan (born 1954)
- Noel Edmonds (born 1948), TV presenter
- Tom Edwards (born 1945), radio broadcaster
- Vanessa Feltz (born 1962), broadcaster and TV chat show host
- Yvette Fielding (born 1968), children's TV presenter
- Judy Finnigan (born 1948), TV presenter
- Ben Fogle (born 1973), TV presenter of adventure programmes
- Philippa Forrester (born 1968), TV and radio presenter
- Bruce Forsyth (1928–2017), TV presenter
- Kate Garraway (born 1967), TV presenter
- Josie Gibson (born 1985), TV personality and presenter
- Carrie Grant (born 1965), TV presenter and vocal coach
- Alison Hammond (born 1975), TV personality and presenter
- Jasmine Harman (born 1975), TV presenter of property programmes
- Anne Hegerty (born 1958), TV quizzer
- Vick Hope (born 1989), TV and radio presenter
- Kate Humble (born 1968), wildlife TV presenter
- Jake Humphrey (born 1978), TV presenter
- Konnie Huq (born 1975), TV presenter
- Greg James (born 1985), radio presenter
- Jon Kay (born 1969), TV presenter
- Vernon Kay (born 1974), TV presenter
- Matthew Kelly (born 1950), TV presenter
- Johnny Kingdom (1939–2018), wildlife TV presenter
- Nick Knowles (born 1962), DIY TV presenter
- Ruth Langsford (born 1960), TV presenter and panellist
- Lauren Laverne (born 1978), radio presenter
- Chantelle Lindsay (born 1994), wildlife TV presenter
- Dominic Littlewood (born 1965), TV presenter of consumer protection shows
- Richard Madeley (born 1956), TV presenter
- Timmy Mallett (born 1955), children's TV presenter
- Davina McCall (born 1967), TV presenter
- Paddy McGuinness (born 1973), TV presenter
- Ant McPartlin (born 1975), TV presenter
- Ray Mears (born 1964), author, TV presenter and survival expert
- Sir Patrick Moore (1923–2012), writer, TV presenter, astronomer
- Guy Mowbray (born 1972), football commentator
- Jenni Murray (1950–2026), broadcaster and radio presenter
- John Noakes (1934–2017), children's TV presenter
- Sally Nugent (born 1971), TV presenter
- Melvin Odoom (born 1980), TV and radio presenter
- Des O'Connor (1932–2020), TV presenter
- Paul O'Grady (1955–2023), broadcaster and drag queen
- Dermot O'Leary (born 1973), TV presenter
- Miquita Oliver (born 1984), TV presenter
- Richard Osman (born 1970), TV presenter and game show host
- Michael Parkinson (1935–2023), presenter of British television chat show Parkinson
- Jeremy Paxman (born 1950)
- John Peel (1939–2004), disc jockey, radio presenter, record producer and journalist
- Suzi Perry (born 1970), racing presenter
- Fiona Phillips (born 1961), TV presenter
- Anita Rani (born 1977), TV presenter
- Esther Rantzen (born 1940), TV presenter
- Sophie Raworth (born 1968), broadcaster
- Susanna Reid (born 1970), TV presenter and news anchor
- Anna Richardson (born 1970), TV presenter
- Anne Robinson (born 1944), TV game show presenter
- Jonathan Ross (born 1960), TV chat show host
- June Sarpong (born 1977), TV presenter and executive
- Jimmy Savile (1926–2011), disc jockey, TV presenter, writer and media personality
- Ben Shephard (born 1974), TV presenter
- Ranvir Singh (born 1977), TV presenter and news anchor
- Valerie Singleton (born 1937), children's TV presenter
- Paul Sinha (born 1970), TV quizzer
- Helen Skelton (born 1983), TV presenter
- Mike Smith (1955–2014), TV and radio presenter
- Stacey Solomon (born 1989), TV personality and presenter
- John Stapleton (1946–2025), TV presenter
- Jeff Stelling (born 1955), sports TV presenter
- Ed Stewart (1941–2016), radio and TV presenter
- Michaela Strachan (born 1996), wildlife TV presenter
- Melanie Sykes (born 1970), TV presenter
- Chris Tarrant (born 1946), quiz show presenter
- Jamie Theakston (born 1970), children's TV presenter
- Anthea Turner (born 1960), children's TV presenter
- Laura Tobin (born 1981), weather presenter
- Jeremy Vine (born 1965), TV and radio presenter
- Gok Wan (born 1974), fashion TV presenter
- Tim Westwood (born 1957), radio DJ
- Charlene White (born 1980), TV presenter and panellist
- Jo Whiley (born 1965), radio presenter and DJ
- Emma Willis (born 1976), TV presenter
- Holly Willoughby (born 1981), TV presenter
- Claudia Winkleman (born 1972), TV presenter
- Dale Winton (1955–2018), TV presenter
- Dominic Wood (born 1977), TV presenter
- Helen Wood, TV personality
- Laura Woods (born 1987), sports TV presenter

== Businesspeople ==
- Sir Frederic Bolton (1851–1920), shipping
- Karren Brady (born 1969), business executive, football managing director
- Sir Richard Branson (born 1950)
- Charles Bray (1811–1884), ribbon manufacturer
- Sir John Brunner (1842–1919), chemicals
- Frank Bustard (1886–1974), shipping
- Ossie Clark (1942–1996), fashion
- Eleanor Coade (1733–1821), statue manufacturing
- Joseph Crosfield (1792–1844), soap and chemicals
- Sara Davies (born 1984), crafting entrepreneur and TV personality
- Ron Dennis (born 1947), McLaren automotive
- Mary Dicas (fl. 1800–1818), scientific instrument making
- John Foster (1798–1879), cloth
- Cindy Gallop (born 1960), advertising
- William Gossage (1799–1877), soap
- Philip Green (born 1952), retail
- James Hanson, Baron Hanson (1922–2004), industrialist
- Charles D. Harman, investment banking
- Thomas Hazlehurst (1779–1842), soap and alkali
- Peter Van Herrewege (born 1953), retirement homes
- Robert Spear Hudson (1812–1884), soap powder
- John Hutchinson (1825–1865), alkali
- Peter Jones (born 1966)
- Sir Freddie Laker (1922–2006), pioneer of cheap air travel
- William Losh (1770–1861), alkali
- Deborah Meaden (born 1959), travel entrepreneur and TV personality
- Alfred Mond (1868–1930), chemicals
- Henry Mond (1898–1949), chemicals
- Julian Mond (1925–1973), industrialist
- Stephan Morais (born 1973)
- William Morris, 1st Viscount Nuffield (1877–1963)
- Edmund Knowles Muspratt (1833–1923), industrialist
- Richard Muspratt (1822–1885), industrialist
- Hester Parnall (1868–1939), brewing
- Mary Portas (born 1960), retail consulting
- Sam Roddick (born 1971), lingerie
- Charles Roe (1715–1781), silk industry
- Joseph Rowntree (1836–1925), chocolate and confectionery
- Tony Rudd (1924–2017), stockbroking
- Titus Salt (1803–1876), industrialist
- Harriet Samuel (1836–1908), jewellery
- Sir Ivan Stedeford (1897–1975), industrialist
- Eddie Stobart (1929–2024), haulage contractor
- Sir Alan Sugar (born 1947), electronics
- Joseph Terry (1828–1898), confectionery
- Dianne Thompson (born 1950), CEO of Camelot Group
- Richard Tompkins (1918–1992), Green Shield trading stamps
- Jamie Waller (born 1979), entrepreneur
- Josiah Wedgwood (1730–1795), industrialist
- Trinny Woodall (born 1964), beauty entrepreneur
- Elma Yerburgh (1864–1946), brewing

== Chefs ==
- Lisa Allen (born 1981)
- Frances Atkins
- Mary Berry (born 1935)
- April Bloomfield (born 1974)
- Heston Blumenthal (born 1966)
- Michael Caines (born 1969)
- Avis Crocombe (c. 1839 – 1927)
- Tamasin Day-Lewis (born 1953)
- Fuchsia Dunlop
- Gizzi Erskine (born 1979)
- Hugh Fearnley-Whittingstall (born 1965)
- Keith Floyd (1943–2009)
- Ravneet Gill (born 1991)
- Rose Gray (1939–2010)
- Sophie Grigson (born 1959)
- Fiona Hamilton-Fairley (born 1963)
- Angela Hartnett (born 1968)
- Rosemary Hume (1907–1984)
- Nadiya Hussain (born 1984)
- Robert Irvine (born 1965)
- Tom Kerridge (born 1973)
- Rachel Khoo (born 1980)
- Diana Kennedy (1923–2022)
- Nigella Lawson (born 1960)
- Rosa Lewis (1867–1952)
- Agnes Marshall (1852–1905)
- Elizabeth Marshall
- James Martin (born 1972)
- Allegra McEvedy (born 1970)
- Mary-Ellen McTague
- Ella Mills (born 1991)
- Jack Monroe (born 1988)
- Jamie Oliver (born 1975)
- Poppy O'Toole (born 1994)
- Merrilees Parker (born 1971)
- Lorraine Pascale (born 1972)
- Jennifer Paterson (1928–1999)
- Marguerite Patten (1915–2015)
- Gordon Ramsay (born 1966)
- Gary Rhodes (1960–2019)
- Rosemary Shrager (born 1951)
- Delia Smith (born 1941)
- Rick Stein (born 1947)
- Ruby Tandoh (born 1992)
- Emily Watkins
- Marco Pierre White (born 1961)
- Anne Willan (born 1938)
- Sophie Wright
- Antony Worrall Thompson (born 1951)

== Comedians ==
- James Acaster (born 1985)
- Maisie Adam (born 1994)
- Jayde Adams (born 1984)
- Chris Addison (born 1972)
- Fiona Allen (born 1965)
- Chesney Allen (1893–1982)
- Stephen K. Amos (born 1967)
- Simon Amstell (born 1979)
- Avril Angers (1918–2005)
- Rowan Atkinson (born 1955)
- Richard Ayoade (born 1977)
- Pam Ayres (born 1947)
- Sadia Azmat (born 1990)
- Bill Bailey (born 1965)
- Ronnie Barker (1929–2005)
- Sacha Baron Cohen (born 1971)
- Julian Barratt (born 1968)
- Angela Barnes (born 1976)
- Lucy Beaumont (born 1983)
- Rob Beckett (born 1986)
- Matt Berry (born 1974)
- John Bird (1936–2022)
- Jo Brand (born 1957)
- Katy Brand (born 1979)
- Russell Brand (born 1975)
- Marcus Brigstocke (born 1973)
- Charlie Brooker (born 1971)
- Roy 'Chubby' Brown (born 1945)
- Adam Buxton (born 1969)
- Alan Carr (born 1976)
- Jimmy Carr (born 1972)
- Jasper Carrott (born 1945)
- Charlie Chaplin (1889–1977)
- Graham Chapman (1941–1989)
- Bridget Christie (born 1971)
- John Cleese (born 1939)
- Roisin Conaty (born 1979)
- Nina Conti (born 1975)
- Steve Coogan (born 1965)
- Peter Cook (1937–1995)
- Tommy Cooper (1921–1984)
- James Corden (born 1978)
- Barry Cryer (1935–2022)
- Jon Culshaw (born 1968)
- Jim Davidson (born 1953)
- Les Dawson (1931–1993)
- Angus Deayton (born 1956)
- Hugh Dennis (born 1962)
- Amelia Dimoldenberg (born 1994)
- Reg Dixon (1915–1984)
- Ken Dodd (1929–2018)
- Jenny Eclair (born 1960)
- Ade Edmondson (born 1957)
- Tameka Empson (born 1977)
- Jo Enright (born 1968)
- Lee Evans (born 1964)
- Noel Fielding (born 1973)
- Bud Flanagan (1896–1968)
- Micky Flanagan (born 1962)
- Paul Foot (born 1973)
- John Fortune (1939–2013)
- Dawn French (born 1957)
- Stephen Fry (born 1958)
- Ed Gamble (born 1986)
- Ricky Gervais (born 1961)
- Dave Gorman (born 1971)
- Tony Hancock (1924–1968)
- Jeremy Hardy (1961–2019)
- Miranda Hart (born 1972)
- Lenny Henry (born 1958)
- Richard Herring (born 1967)
- Benny Hill (1924–1992)
- Matthew Holness (born 1975)
- Alex Horne (born 1978)
- Russell Howard (born 1980)
- Lee Hurst (born 1963)
- Eric Idle (born 1943)
- Krissie Illing (born 1956)
- Robin Ince (born 1969)
- Eddie Izzard (born 1962)
- Jethro (1948–2021)
- Josh Jones (born 1992)
- Milton Jones (born 1964)
- Rosie Jones (born 1990)
- Miles Jupp (born 1979)
- Russell Kane (born 1980)
- Fred Karno (1866–1941)
- Peter Kay (born 1973)
- Harriet Kemsley (born 1987)
- Sarah Keyworth (born 1993)
- Hetty King (1883–1972)
- Hugh Laurie (born 1959)
- Stewart Lee (born 1968)
- Cariad Lloyd (born 1982)
- Josie Long (born 1982)
- Judi Love (born 1980)
- Alice Lowe (born 1977)
- Matt Lucas (born 1974)
- Joe Lycett (born 1988)
- Lee Mack (born 1968)
- Ania Magliano (born 1998)
- Stephen Mangan (born 1968)
- Bernard Manning (1930–2007)
- Stevie Martin (born 1988)
- Rik Mayall (1958–2014)
- Chris McCausland (born 1977)
- Alistair McGowan (born 1964)
- Rory McGrath (born 1956)
- Paddy McGuinness (born 1973)
- Michael McIntyre (born 1976)
- Stephen Merchant (born 1974)
- Paul Merton (born 1957)
- Sarah Millican (born 1975)
- Shazia Mirza (born 1972)
- David Mitchell (born 1974)
- Bob Monkhouse (1928–2003)
- Eric Morecambe (1926–1984)
- Diane Morgan (born 1975)
- Chris Morris (born 1962)
- Bob Mortimer (born 1959)
- Frank Muir (1920–1998)
- Al Murray (born 1968)
- Denis Norden (1922–2018)
- Paul O'Grady (1955–2023)
- Sukh Ojla (born 1984)
- Michael Palin (born 1943)
- Karl Pilkington (born 1972)
- Andy Parsons (born 1967)
- Sara Pascoe (born 1981)
- Sue Perkins (born 1969)
- Lucy Porter (born 1973)
- Romesh Ranganathan (born 1978)
- Jan Ravens (born 1958)
- Vic Reeves (born 1959)
- Mike Reid (1940–2007)
- Suzi Ruffell (born 1986)
- Lou Sanders (born 1978)
- Jennifer Saunders (born 1958)
- Peter Sellers (1925–1980)
- Frank Skinner (born 1957)
- Arthur Smith (born 1954)
- Laura Smyth (born 1981)
- Freddie Starr (1943–2019)
- Isy Suttie (born 1978)
- Ellie Taylor
- Vesta Tilley (1864–1952)
- Tracey Ullman (born 1959)
- Johnny Vegas (born 1970)
- Ava Vidal (born 1976)
- Tim Vine (born 1967)
- David Walliams (born 1971)
- Holly Walsh (born 1980)
- Robert Webb (born 1972)
- Jack Whitehall (born 1988)
- Josh Widdicombe (born 1983)
- Norman Wisdom (1915–2010)
- Ernie Wise (1925–1999)
- Victoria Wood (1953–2016)
- Gina Yashere (born 1974)

== Criminals ==
- Imran Ahmad Khan (born 1973), MP convicted of sexually assaulting a 15-year-old
- Ronnie Biggs (1929–2013), Great Train Robbery of 1963
- Linda Calvey (born 1948), gangster
- Mary Frith (1584–1659), pickpocket and fence
- Myra Hindley (1942–2002), Moors murderer
- Ian Huntley (1974-2026), Soham murderer
- The Kray twins (Ronald 1933–1995, Reginald 1933–2000), east London gangsters
- Michael McCrea (born 1958), former financial adviser and convicted killer who was jailed 24 years for the culpable homicide of a couple in Singapore.
- Jimmy Moody (1941–1993), armed robber, reputed contract killer and prison escapee
- Raymond Morris (1929–2014), murderer
- John Martin Scripps (1959–1996), spree killer who was executed for murdering a South African tourist in Singapore.
- Harold Shipman (1946–2004), possibly the most prolific serial killer worldwide; convicted of 15 murders; probably killed over 250
- Peter Sutcliffe (1946–2020), the "Yorkshire Ripper"
- Fred West (1941–1995) and Rosemary West (born 1953), serial killers
- Steve Wright (born 1958), serial killer
- Graham Young (1947–1990), the "Teacup Poisoner"

== Dancers ==
- Elizabeth Anderton (born 1938), ballet dancer
- Shirley Ballas (born 1960), ballroom dancer
- Ashley Banjo (born 1988), street dancer
- Jordan Banjo (born 1992), street dancer
- Liberty Barros (born 2007), yoga dancer
- Warren Bullock (born 1965), ballroom dancer
- Darcey Bussell (born 1969), ballet dancer
- Vernon Castle (1887–1918), ballroom dancer
- Joanne Clifton (born 1983), ballroom dancer
- Kevin Clifton (born 1982), ballroom dancer
- Lewis Cope (born 1995), dancer and actor
- Luke Cresswell (born 1963), dancer
- Matthew Cutler (born 1973), ballroom dancer
- Anton Du Beke (born 1966), ballroom dancer
- Margot Fonteyn (1919–1991), ballet dancer
- Celia Franca (1921–2007), ballet dancer
- John Gilpin (1930–1983), ballet dancer
- Len Goodman (1944–2023), ballroom dancer
- Diana Gould (1912–2003), ballet dancer
- Karen Hardy (born 1970), ballroom dancer
- Winifred Hart-Dyke (1881–1976), dancer and actress
- James Jordan (born 1978), ballroom dancer
- Akram Khan (born 1974), dancer and choreographer
- Perri Kiely (born 1995), street dancer
- Alice Lethbridge (1866–1948), music hall dancer
- Alex Moore (1901–1991), ballroom dancer
- Margaret Morris (dancer) (1891–1980), Celtic ballet dancer
- Lauren Oakley (born 1991), ballroom dancer
- Arlene Phillips (born 1943), dancer and choreographer
- Jeanette Rutherston (1902–1988), dancer and critic
- Hester Santlow (1690–1773), ballet dancer
- Ciara Sexton (born 1988), Irish dancer and choreographer
- Emma Slater (born 1988), ballroom dancer
- Wayne Sleep (born 1948), ballet dancer
- Antony Tudor (1908–1987), ballet dancer and choreographer
- Kate Vaughan (1855–1903), music hall dancer
- Ian Waite (born 1971), ballroom dancer
- Kai Widdrington (born 1995), ballroom dancer
- Robin Windsor (1979–2024), ballroom dancer

== Economists ==
- R. G. D. Allen (1906–1983), economist, mathematician, and statistician
- Norman Angell (1872–1967), internationalist and economist
- Vera Anstey (1889–1976), economist and expert of the economy of India
- William Beveridge (1879–1963), economist and social reformer
- Edwin Cannan (1861–1935), economist and historian
- Colin Clark (1905–1989), British and Australian economist
- Ronald Coase (1910–2013), Nobel Prize–winning economist
- Martin Ellison, consultant to the Bank of England
- Friedrich Hayek (1899–1992), Nobel Prize–winning economist
- John Hicks (1904–1989), Nobel Prize–winning economist
- John Holland (1658–1722), founder of the Bank of Scotland in 1695
- William Stanley Jevons (1835–1882), economist and logician
- John Maynard Keynes (1883–1946), economist
- John Neville Keynes (1852–1949), economist, father of John Maynard Keynes
- Arthur Lewis (1915–1991), economist
- Thomas Malthus (1766–1834), demographer
- Alfred Marshall (1842–1924), economist
- Mary Paley Marshall (1850–1944), economist, wife of Alfred Marshall
- James Meade (1907–1995), Nobel Prize–winning economist
- John Stuart Mill (1806–1873), philosopher and economist
- Arthur Cecil Pigou (1877–1959), economist
- Lionel Robbins (1898–1984), economist
- Joan Robinson (1903–1983), economist
- Faiza Shaheen (born 1982), economist in the field of income inequality
- Richard Stone (1913–1991), Nobel Prize–winning economist
- Robert Torrens (1780–1864), army officer and economist
- Philip Wicksteed (1844–1927), economist

== Engineers ==
- Sir Benjamin Baker (1840–1907), civil engineer, co-designer of the Forth Railway Bridge
- William Baker (1817–1878), railway engineer
- Karen Banks (fl. 2028), internet pioneer
- Joseph Bazalgette (1819–1891), civil engineer, best known for creating the London Sewer System, hence making the city a healthier place to live
- James Beatty (1820–1856), railway engineer
- Sir Henry Bessemer (1813–1898), metallurgy engineer
- Edward Betts (1815–1872), civil engineering contractor
- William Binnie (1867–1949), civil engineer
- Ronald Eric Bishop (1903–1989), chief designer of the de Havilland Mosquito
- James Brindley (1716–1772), canal engineer
- Isambard Kingdom Brunel (1806–1859), transport engineer
- Sir Sydney Camm (1894–1966), aeronautical engineer
- Donald Campbell, railway engineer
- William Tierney Clark (1783–1852), civil engineer
- Sir Geoffrey de Havilland (1882–1965), aeronautical engineer
- Edmund Dummer (1651–1713), naval engineer
- Sir John Ambrose Fleming (1848–1945), electrical engineer
- Tommy Flowers (1908–1998), designer and builder of the first electronic computer
- Sir John Fowler, 1st Baronet, civil engineer most famous as co-designer, alongside Benjamin Baker, of the Forth Railway Bridge
- Isabel Hardwich (1919–1987), electrical engineer
- Jesse Hartley (1780–1860), civil engineer
- J. B. Hartley (1814–1869), civil engineer
- Benjamin Hick (1790–1842), civil and mechanical engineer
- John Hick (1815–1894), civil and mechanical engineer
- Eric Laithwaite (1908–1998), engineer
- Sir William Lyons (1901–1985), engineer, co-founder of the automobile manufacturer Jaguar
- William Mackenzie (1794–1851), civil engineer and contractor
- R.J. Mitchell (1895–1937), aeronautical engineer
- Robert Rawlinson (1810–1898), engineer
- Sir Samuel Morton Peto (1809–1889), civil engineering contractor
- Margaret Dorothea Rowbotham (1883–1978), engineer
- Sir Henry Royce (1863–1933), engineer
- Beatrice Shilling (1909–1990), aeronautical engineer
- Nevil Shute (1899–1960), aeronautical engineer and author
- George Stephenson (1781–1848), railway engineer
- Charles Todd (1826–1910), meteorologist, in charge of constructing the Overland Telegraph across Australia
- Henrietta Vansittart (1833–1883), engineer and inventor
- Sir Barnes Wallis (1887–1978), engineer
- John Webster (1845–1914), engineer
- Sir Joseph Whitworth (1803–1887), engineer

== Explorers ==
- Gertrude Bell (1868–1926), traveller in Iraq
- Thomas Cavendish (1560–1592), one of the Elizabethan Sea Dogs, privateer, navigator
- Capt. James Cook (1728–1779), sailor, explorer
- William Dampier (1651–1715)
- Ann Daniels (born 1964), polar explorer
- John Davis (1550–1605), Sea Dog, explorer and navigator
- Charles Montagu Doughty (1843–1926), explorer in the Middle East
- Sir Francis Drake (c. 1540 – 1596)
- Sir Ranulph Fiennes (born 1944), listed as the "greatest living explorer" by the Guinness Book of Records
- Martin Frobisher (1535–1594), navigator, one of the Elizabethan Sea Dogs
- Rob Gauntlett (1987–2009), youngest Briton to summit Everest
- Sir Robin Knox-Johnston (born 1939), first person to perform single handed non-stop circumnavigation of the globe
- Michael Palin (born 1943)
- Sir Walter Raleigh (c. 1552 – 1618)
- Robert Falcon Scott (1868–1912), Antarctic explorer
- Ed Stafford (born 1975), first person to walk the complete length of the Amazon River
- Freya Stark (1893–1993), Middle East explorer
- Wilfred Thesiger (1910–2003), explorer in East Africa and the Middle East
- Henry Timberlake (1570–1625), merchant and traveller
- Helen Sharman (born 1963), first British person in space and first woman to visit the Mir Space Station
- Major Tim Peake (born 1972), first British person in space under the European Space Agency and first British Person to visit the International Space Station

== Filmmakers ==
- Richard Attenborough (1923–2014)
- John Boorman (born 1933)
- John and Roy Boulting (1913–1985 and 1913–2001)
- Danny Boyle (born 1956)
- Alan Clarke (1935–1990)
- Charlie Chaplin (1889–1977)
- Emerald Fennell (born 1975)
- Mike Figgis (born 1948)
- Lewis Gilbert (1920–2018)
- David Hare (born 1947)
- Alfred Hitchcock (1899–1980)
- Peter Howitt (born 1957)
- Humphrey Jennings (1907–1950)
- Stan Laurel (1890–1965)
- David Lean (1908–1991)
- Mike Leigh (born 1943)
- Ken Loach (born 1936)
- Nick Love (born 1969)
- Sharon Maguire (born 1960)
- Anthony Minghella (1954–2008)
- Carol Morley (born 1966)
- Mike Newell (born 1942)
- Christopher Nolan (born 1970)
- Nick Park (born 1958)
- Michael Powell (1905–1990)
- Guy Ritchie (born 1968)
- Ken Russell (1927–2011)
- Ridley Scott (born 1937)
- Tony Scott (1944–2012)
- Sam Taylor-Johnson (born 1967)

== Historians ==
- Peter Ackroyd (born 1949), biographer and historian of London
- Jill Allibone (1932–1998), architectural historian
- John Ashdown-Hill (1949–2018), medievalist
- John Baker (born 1944), legal historian
- Frank Barlow (1911–2009), biographer and historian
- Robert Bartlett (born 1950), historian and medievalist
- Mary Beard (born 1955), historian and classicist
- Mary Matilda Betham (1776–1852), biographer
- Jim Bradbury (1937–2023), military historian of the medieval period
- Anthony Randolph Bridbury (1924–2015), economic historian and medievalist
- Asa Briggs (1921–2016), historian of the Victorian period
- Mark Bryant (born 1953), cartoon historian
- Bernard Burke (1814–1892), genealogist
- William Camden (1551–1623), antiquarian
- Helen H. Carr (born 1988), historian and broadcaster
- Helen Castor (born 1968), historian of the medieval and Tudor period
- Marjorie Chibnall (1915–2012), historian, medievalist and Latin translator
- George Edward Cokayne (1825–1911), genealogist
- Elizabeth Crawford, historian of the women's suffrage movement
- Ilse Crawford (born 1974), historian
- William Dugdale (1605–1686), antiquary
- William Arthur Evelyn (1860–1935), historian of York
- Nicholas Foulkes (born 1964), social historian
- Antonia Fraser (born 1932), historian and novelist
- Helen Fry (born 1967), historian of World War II
- Delia Gaze (born 1951), art historian
- Edward Gibbon (1737–1794), historian and classicist
- Ruth Goodman (born 1963), historian of the early modern period
- Natalie Haynes (born 1974), historian and classicist
- Richard Holmes (1946–2011), military historian and author
- Bettany Hughes (born 1967), historian and classicist
- Eric Ives (1931–2012), historian of the Tudor period
- Lisa Jardine, (1944–2015), historian of the early modern period
- Greg Jenner (born 1982), public historian and radio broadcaster
- Alex J. Kay (born 1979), historian of Nazi Germany
- Alison Kelly (1913–2016), art historian
- Robert Lacey (born 1944), historian and biographer
- Sir Peter Leycester (1614–1678), historian and antiquarian
- Suzannah Lipscomb (born 1978), historian of the sixteenth-century
- Frederic William Maitland (1850–1906), legal historian
- Doris Langley Moore (1902–1989), fashion historian and museum founder
- Ian Mortimer (born 1968), medievalist and historical fiction writer
- Elizabeth Norton (born 1986), historian of the Tudor period
- George Ormerod (1785–1873), historian and antiquary
- Peter Quennell (1905–1993), literary historian
- Andrew Roberts (born 1963), popular historian and journalist
- Nicholas Rodger (born 1949), naval historian
- Emma Rothschild (born 1948), economic historian
- Sheila Rowbotham (born 1943), women's historian
- Simon Schama, historian
- John Speed (1542–1629), historian and cartographer
- David Starkey (born 1945), historian, radio and television presenter
- Frank Stenton (1880–1967), historian of Anglo-Saxon England
- Agnes Strickland (1796–1874), historian and poet
- Philip Sugden (1947–2014), historian
- A.J.P. Taylor (1906–1990), historian
- Arnold J. Toynbee (1889–1975), historian and philosopher of history
- G. M. Trevelyan (1876–1962), historian and academic
- Jenny Uglow (born 1947), historian
- Alison Weir, public historian and historian of royal women
- A. N. Wilson (born 1950), historian and newspaper columnist
- Lucy Worsley (born 1973), historian, curator and television presenter
- Frances Yates (1899–1981), historian of the Renaissance and the history of esotericism

== Inventors ==
See also List of English inventions and discoveries.

- Ruth Amos (born 1989), entrepreneur and inventor of StairSteady
- Richard Arkwright (1733–1792), revolutionised the cotton industry in England during the Industrial Revolution; once called the "father of the Industrial Revolution"
- Sir Tim Berners-Lee (born 1955), inventor of the World Wide Web
- Henry Bessemer (1813–1898), inventor of the Bessemer Process which was the first way of mass-producing steel
- Hubert Cecil Booth (1871–1955), inventor of the vacuum cleaner
- Joseph Bramah (1748–1814), inventor of the hydraulic press (beer pump)
- Sir Henry Cavendish (1731–1810), discoverer of hydrogen
- Christopher Cockerell (1910–1999), inventor of the hovercraft
- William Congreve (1772–1828), rocketry pioneer
- Abraham Darby (c. 1678 – 1717), ironmaster
- James Dyson (born 1947), inventor
- Alfred Robert Grindlay (1876–1965), inventor, industrialist and politician
- James Hargreaves (1720–1778), weaver and inventor
- Sir John Harington (1561–1612), poet and inventor of the first water closet
- John Harrison (1693–1776), clockmaker
- Rowland Hill (1795–1879), inventor of the modern postal service
- Benjamin Huntsman (1704–1776), inventor of crucible steel
- Archibald Low (1888–1956), radio guidance
- Thomas Newcomen (1664–1729), inventor
- Sir Isaac Newton (1642–1727), founder of modern physics, inventor of the reflector telescope
- Sir Clive Sinclair (1940–2021), most commonly known for his work in the consumer electronics sector
- James Starley (1831–1881), bicycle pioneer
- George Stephenson (1781–1848), engineer
- Joseph Wilson Swan (1823–1914), inventor of the light bulb
- Charles Wheatstone (1802–1875), inventor
- Sir Frank Whittle (1907–1996), inventor of the jet engine
- Joseph Whitworth (1803–1887), inventor, known for standardising the screw thread

== Journalists ==
- Kate Adie (born 1945), war correspondent
- Dolly Alderton (born 1988), columnist
- Mark Austin (born 1958), journalist and presenter
- Clive Barnes (1927–2008), theatre critic
- Martin Bashir (born 1963), journalist
- Isabella Blow (1958–2007), magazine editor
- Reginald Bosanquet (1932–1984), news anchor
- Jennie Bond (born 1950)
- Christopher Booker (1937–2019)
- Kate Bottley (born 1975), journalist and vicar
- Hamish Bowles (born 1963)
- Michael Buerk (born 1946)
- Sir Alastair Burnet (1928–2012)
- Clemency Burton-Hill (born 1981)
- Edward Chattaway (1873–1956), editor of The Star
- Maureen Cleave (1934–2021), music journalist
- Jill Dando (1961–1999)
- Sir Robin Day (1923–2000)
- Victoria Derbyshire (born 1968), news anchor
- Katie Derham (born 1970)
- Peter Donaldson (1945–2015), radio presenter
- Stacey Dooley (born 1987), investigative documentary maker
- Gillian Duffy, food writer
- Lorna Dunkley, news anchor and journalist
- Julie Etchingham (born 1969), news anchor
- Dele Fadele (1962–2018), music journalist
- Anna Ford (born 1943), news anchor
- David Foot (1929–2021), cricket journalist
- Paul Foot (1937–2004)
- Andrew Gardner (1932–1999)
- Madge Garland (1898–1990), fashion journalist
- Gary Gibbon (born 1965), political editor
- Krishnan Guru-Murthy (born 1970), news anchor
- Nina Hibbin (1922–2004), film critic
- Nina Hossain (born 1975), news anchor
- Jemima Hunt (born 1969), journalist and novelist
- Richard Ingrams (born 1937)
- Deborah James (1981–2022), journalist and charity campaigner
- Simon Jenkins (born 1943), newspaper columnist and editor
- Rachel Johnson (born 1965), journalist and TV presenter
- Liz Jones (born 1958), fashion journalist
- Owen Jones (born 1984), political journalist
- Natasha Kaplinsky (born 1972), news anchor
- Suzy Klein (born 1975), music writer
- Trevor Kavanagh (born 1943), political commentator
- Eardley Knollys (1902–1991), art critic
- Laura Kuenssberg (born 1976), political editor
- Neil Kulkarni (1972–2024), music critic
- Christina Lamb (born 1965)
- Paris Lees
- Alastair Leithead (born 1972)
- Chris Mason (born 1980), political journalist
- Robin Merrill (born 20th century)
- Lottie Moggach
- Caitlin Moran (born 1975), music journalist and author
- Naga Munchetty (born 1975), news anchor
- Cathy Newman (born 1974), journalist and news anchor
- Victoria Newton (born 1970), showbiz columnist
- Mary Nightingale (born 1963), news anchor
- Nick Owen (born 1947), news anchor
- Tony Parsons (born 1953), music journalist
- Jeremy Paxman (born 1950)
- Constance Peel (1868–1934), journalist
- Laurie Penny (born 1986), political journalist
- Sophie Raworth (born 1968), news anchor
- Angela Rippon (born 1944)
- Justine Roberts (born 1967), website founder
- Willie Rushton (1937–1996)
- Polly Russell, food writer
- Alexandra Shulman (born 1957), magazine editor
- Peter Sissons (1942–2019), news anchor
- Nigel Slater (born 1956), food writer
- Jon Snow (born 1947), news anchor
- Alastair Stewart (born 1952)
- Janet Street-Porter (born 1946), journalist and TV personality
- Moira Stuart (born 1949), news anchor
- Polly Toynbee (born 1946), columnist
- Graham Usher (1958–2013), correspondent
- Katharine Viner (born 1971), editor
- Irving Wardle (1929–2023), theatre critic
- Anna Wintour (born 1949), fashion magazine editor
- Audrey Withers (1905–2001), magazine editor
- Bob Woffinden (1948–2018), investigative journalist
- Camilla Wright (born 1970)

== Military personnel ==
- John Adams (1767–1829), last survivor of the Bounty Mutineers
- Harold Alexander, 1st Earl Alexander of Tunis (1891–1969), field marshal, Second World War commander
- Jeffrey Amherst, 1st Baron Amherst of Montreal (1717–1797), general
- George Anson, 1st Baron Anson (1697–1762), Admiral of the Fleet, noted naval reformer
- Sir Claude Auchinleck (1884–1981), Second World War commander
- Reginald Bacon (1863–1947), admiral, pioneer of submarines and torpedoes for the Royal Navy
- Robert Baden-Powell (1857–1941), soldier
- Sir Douglas Bader (1910–1982), fighter pilot
- Ralph Bagnold (1896–1990), founder of the Long Range Desert Group; explorer
- Sir Alexander John Ball (1759–1809), admiral, governor of Malta
- Samuel Barrington (1729–1800), rear admiral
- Lord Aubrey Beauclerk (1710–1741), Officer of the Royal Navy
- John Benbow (1653–1702), admiral
- George Charles Bingham, 3rd Earl of Lucan (1800–1888), Commander of cavalry at the Battle of Balaclava
- William Riddell Birdwood, 1st Baron Birdwood (1865–1951), general, First World War
- Robert Blake (1599–1657), reforming Royal Navy Admiral
- William Bligh (1754–1817), best known for the mutiny of the Bounty
- James Henry Robinson Bond (1871–1943), corporal in the Royal Army Medical Corps
- Sir John Borlase Warren, 1st Baronet (1753–1822), admiral
- Philip Broke (1776–1841), rear admiral, known for his capture of USS Chesapeake
- Thomas Bruce (1738–1797), lieutenant general and politician
- James Thomas Brudenell, 7th Earl of Cardigan (1797–1888), Commander of the Light Brigade
- Richard Francis Burton (1821–1890), soldier, spy, linguist and explorer
- Freddie Spencer Chapman (1907–1971), known for his exploits in the jungle during the Second World War
- Leonard Cheshire VC (1917–1992), Royal Air Force pilot during Second World War and founder of the Cheshire Homes
- John Churchill, 1st Duke of Marlborough (1650–1722), soldier
- Sir Winston Churchill (1874–1965), British prime minister
- Charles Clerke (1741–1779), sailed with James Cook on all three of his expeditions, was the Captain of Discovery at the time of Cook's death he then took command until his own death at sea shortly after
- Sir George Cockburn, 10th Baronet (1772–1853), Admiral of the Fleet, admiral in charge at the capture and burning of Washington in 1814
- Edwin Cole (1895–1984), Squadron Leader
- Cuthbert Collingwood (1748–1810), vice admiral, Commander-in-chief of the Mediterranean Fleet
- Henry Seymour Conway (1721–1795), general
- John Cooke (1762–1805), captain of HMS Bellerophon at the Battle of Trafalgar, where he was subsequently killed
- Charles Cornwallis, 1st Marquess Cornwallis (1738–1805), general
- Christopher Augustus Cox (1889–1959), private
- Christopher Augustus Cox (1889–1959), private
- Miles Dempsey (1896–1969), commander of the British Second Army During the D-Day landing
- Sir Francis Drake (1540–1596), sailor
- Sir John Duckworth (1748–1817), admiral, known for the Battle of San Domingo
- Thomas Farrington (1664–1712), lieutenant general
- Alexander Fraser (1824–1898), general
- Bruce Fraser (1888–1981), Admiral of the Fleet, commander of the British Pacific Fleet during the Second World War
- Prince Frederick, Duke of York (1763–1827), son of King George III, Commander-in-Chief of the Forces during French Revolutionary and Napoleonic Wars
- John French, 1st Earl of Ypres (1852–1925), general, World War I and Lord Lieutenant of Ireland
- Prince George, Duke of Cambridge (1819–1904), Commander-in-Chief of the Forces
- Charles George Gordon ("Chinese Gordon") (1833–1885), killed at Khartoum
- Hubert Gough (1870–1963), general
- Sir Thomas Hardy, 1st Baronet (1769–1859), vice-admiral, captained HMS Victory at the Battle of Trafalgar
- Sir Arthur Travers Harris (1892–1984), Marshal of the Royal Air Force, airman
- Eliab Harvey (1758–1830), admiral, captain of HMS Temeraire, which played a crucial role at the Battle of Trafalgar
- Edward Hawke (1705–1781), Admiral of the Fleet, best known as the admiral at the Battle of Quiberon Bay
- John Hawkwood (1320–1394), famous medieval mercenary
- Samuel Hood, 1st Viscount Hood (1724–1816), mentor of Nelson
- Brian Horrocks (1895–1985), highly regarded general during World War II
- William Hoste (1780–1828), well-known frigate captain during the Napoleonic War
- William Hotham, 1st Baron Hotham (1736–1813), admiral
- John Howard (1912–1999), British Army major who led the coup de main party that captured the Caen canal and Orne river bridges.
- Richard Howe, 1st Earl Howe (1726–1799), admiral
- William Howe, 5th Viscount Howe (1729–1814), general in the American Revolutionary War
- John Jellicoe, 1st Earl Jellicoe (1859–1935), admiral during the First World War
- Louis Fleeming Jenkin (1895–1917), captain
- Roger Keyes, 1st Baron Keyes (1872–1945), admiral
- Horatio Kitchener, 1st Earl Kitchener of Khartoum (1850–1916), field marshal
- Lofty Large, SAS soldier, author
- FitzRoy Henry Lee (1699–1750), Vice Admiral, Commodore Governor of the Colony of Newfoundland
- John Ligonier, 1st Earl Ligonier (1680–1770), general
- Trafford Leigh-Mallory (1892–1944), air commander of the Allied invasion of Normandy
- John Manners, Marquess of Granby (1721–1770), general
- William McMurdo (1819–1894), general
- Andy McNab (born 1959), former Special Air Service soldier and commander of the infamous Bravo Two Zero mission during the first Iraq Gulf War
- Samuel Mitchell (VC) (1841–1894), killed in action during the New Zealand Wars
- George Monck, 1st Duke of Albemarle (1608–1670), English Civil War era general in Chief Command
- Simon de Montfort, 6th Earl of Leicester (c. 1208 – 1265), statesman and soldier
- Bernard Law Montgomery, 1st Viscount Montgomery of Alamein ("The Desert Rat") (1887–1976), field marshal and hero of World War II
- Louis Mountbatten, 1st Earl Mountbatten of Burma (1900–1979), statesman, sailor
- Horatio Nelson, 1st Viscount Nelson of the Nile (1758–1805), sailor, admiral
- Augustus Charles Newman (1904–1972) VC, The Essex Regiment, No.2 Commando, SAS, led the raid on St. Nazaire
- John Norreys (1547–1597), Tudor soldier
- Henry William Paget, 1st Marquess of Anglesey (1768–1854), general, hero of the Napoleonic Wars
- Sir William Parker (1781–1866), Admiral of the Fleet, was the admiral during the First Opium War
- Arthur Phillip (1738–1814), admiral, commanded the First Fleetinto what is now known as Port Jackson, First Governor of New South Wales
- Basil Charles Godfrey Place VC (1921–1994), along with Donald Cameron VC and crew crippled the pocket battleship Tirpitz during operation Source
- Dudley Pound (1877–1943), Admiral of the Fleet, First Sea Lord during the Second World War
- Henry Pulleine (1838–1879), lieutenant colonel
- Bertram Ramsay (1883–1945), admiral, commander of operation Neptune during Second World War
- Bernard Rawlings (1889–1962), admiral, second in command of the British Pacific Fleet during Second World War
- Frederick Roberts, 1st Earl Roberts of Kandahar (1832–1914), field marshal, last Commander-in-Chief of the Forces
- Sir William Robertson, 1st Baronet (1860–1933), "Wully" Robertson, distinguished soldier; the only man ever in the British Army to rise from the rank of private soldier to field marshal; the head of the Army for much of World War I; a highly influential figure as to strategy
- Frederick John Robinson, 1st Viscount Goderich (1782–1859)
- George Rooke (1650–1709), Admiral of the Fleet
- William Victor Trevor Rooper (1897–1917), captain
- Chris Ryan (born 1961), former Special Air Service soldier and member of the infamous Bravo Two Zero mission during the first Iraq Gulf War
- Siegfried Sassoon (1886–1967), war poet
- Charles Saunders (1715–1775), admiral, commanded the Fleet at the Battle of the Plains of Abraham
- Derek Anthony Seagrim (1903–1943), lieutenant colonel
- Sir James Simpson (1792–1868), general
- William Slim, 1st Viscount Slim (1897–1970), Commander in Burma during Second World War, Governor-General of Australia
- Sir Sidney Smith (1764–1840), Napoleon famously said of him "that man made me miss my destiny"
- Sir Horace Smith-Dorrien (1858–1930), general, World War I
- Fitzroy Somerset, 1st Baron Raglan (1788–1855), British commander in the Crimean War
- James Somerville (1882–1949), Admiral of the Fleet, Commander at Mers-El-Kabir
- Bill Speakman VC (1927–2018), Black Watch, SAS Regiment
- Richard Strachan (1760–1828), known for his action after the Battle of Trafalgar
- James Brian Tait VC (1916–2007), nicknamed" Tirpitz", commander of 617 squadron
- Henry Tandey VC (1891–1977), most highly decorated private of the First World War
- Hugh Trenchard, 1st Viscount Trenchard (1873–1956), "father of the RAF" and first Chief of the Air Staff
- Frederic Thesiger, 2nd Baron Chelmsford (1827–1905), general
- Sir Thomas Troubridge, 1st Baronet (1758–1807), rear admiral
- Reginald Tyrwhitt (1870–1951), Admiral of the Fleet, commander of the Harwich Force during World War I
- George Vancouver (1757–1798), distinguished Royal Navy captain and explorer
- Edward Vernon (1684–1757), admiral
- Philip Vian (1894–1968), Admiral of the Fleet, distinguished destroyer captain also Commander in Charge of Air Operations, British Pacific Fleet during Second World War
- Archibald Percival Wavell, 1st Earl Wavell (1883–1950), World War II general, second to last Viceroy of India
- Sir William Welsh (1891–1962), air marshal
- Jane Whorwood (1612–1684), Royalist agent during the English Civil War
- Prince William Augustus, Duke of Cumberland (1721–1765), captain-general, victor of Culloden
- James Wolfe (1727–1759), general, hero of Quebec during the Seven Years' War
- John Woodhouse (1922–2008), reformed SAS selection and training techniques after World War Two

== Models ==
- Adwoa Aboah (born 1992)
- Saffron Aldridge (born 1968)
- Munroe Bergdorf (born 1987)
- Yasmin Benoit (born 1996)
- Angie Best (born 1952)
- Pattie Boyd (born 1944)
- Bobby Brazier (born 2003)
- Kelly Brook (born 1979)
- Naomi Campbell (born 1970)
- Will Chalker (born 1980)
- Oliver Cheshire (born 1988)
- Alexa Chung (born 1983)
- Abby Clancy (born 1986)
- Lily Cole (born 1987)
- Sam Cooke (born 1985)
- Cara Delevingne (born 1992)
- Dolores (1893–1975)
- Agyness Deyn (born 1983)
- Jourdan Dunn (born 1990)
- Paloma Elsesser (born 1992)
- David Gandy (born 1980)
- Neelam Gill (born 1995)
- Ellie Goldstein (born 2001)
- Alexina Graham (born 1990)
- Jack Guinness (born 1982)
- Calum Harper (born 2002)
- Victoria Hervey (born 1976)
- Rosie Huntington-Whiteley (born 1987)
- Damian Hurley (born 2002)
- Stephen James (born 1990)
- Jodie Kidd (born 1978)
- Penny Lancaster (born 1971)
- Daisy Lowe (born 1989)
- Jane Lumb (1942–2008)
- Heather Mills (born 1968)
- Yasmin Le Bon (born 1964)
- Kate Moss (born 1974)
- June Palmer (1940–2004)
- Lucy Pinder (born 1983)
- Katie Price (born 1978)
- Pamela Rooke (1955–2022)
- Jean Shrimpton (born 1942)
- Paul Sculfor (born 1971)
- Penelope Tree (born 1949)
- Twiggy (born 1949)
- Sam Webb (born 1986)

== Monarchs ==
- Alfred the Great (c. 849–899) (reigned 880s–899), King of the Anglo-Saxons
- Queen Anne (reigned 1702–1714), also Queen of Scotland, then Queen of Great Britain after 1707
- Charles I (reigned 1625–1649), also King of Scotland, and Ireland
- Charles II (reigned 1660–1685), also King of Scotland
- Charles III (reigned 2022–present)
- Cnut (reigned 1016–1035)
- Saint Edward the Confessor (reigned 1042–1066)
- Edward I (reigned 1272–1307), English monarch
- Edward II (reigned 1307–1327), English monarch
- Edward III (reigned 1327–1377), English monarch
- Edward IV (reigned 1461–1470 and 1471–1483), English monarch
- Edward V (reigned 1483–1483), English monarch
- Edward VI (reigned 1547–1553), first English Protestant monarch
- Elizabeth I (reigned 1558–1603), Protestant queen and first Supreme Governor of the Church of England
- Elizabeth II, (reigned 1952–2022) the longest reigning monarch in the UK history
- Empress Matilda, claimant to the English throne and Holy Roman Empress
- Harold Godwinson (reigned 6 January 1066 – 14 October 1066), died in Battle of Hastings
- Harold Harefoot (reigned 1035–1040)
- Harthacnut (reigned 1040–1042)
- Henry I (reigned 1100–1135)
- Henry III (reigned 1216–1272), English monarch
- Henry IV (reigned 1399–1413), English monarch
- Henry V (reigned 1413–1422)
- Henry VI (reigned 1422–1461), English monarch
- Henry VII (reigned 1485–1509) (Henry Tudor, the first Tudor monarch)
- Henry VIII (reigned 1509–1547), separated English Catholicism from link with the Roman Catholic Church
- James II (reigned 1685–1689)
- Lady Jane Grey (de facto 10 July 1553 – 19 July 1553) ("the nine days queen"), beheaded 1554, aged 16
- King John (reigned 1199–1216)
- Mary I (reigned 1553–1558), Roman Catholic queen
- Mary II (reigned 1689–1694), reigned jointly with her husband William III
- Richard of Cornwall (reigned 1257–1272), King of the Romans
- Richard the Lionheart (reigned 1189–1199), Richard I, English monarch, leader and hero of the Third Crusade
- Richard II (reigned 1377–1399)
- Richard III (reigned 1483–1485), last Plantagenet King, and last British monarch to die in Battle
- William I (reigned 1066–1087), "William the Conqueror", William of Normandy
- William II (reigned 1087–1100)
- William III (reigned 1689–1702), "William of Orange", born 1650 at The Hague in Holland, married an English princess, reigned jointly with his wife Mary II, until her death

== Musicians ==
- Jacqui Abbott (born 1973), singer and member of The Beautiful South
- Adele (born 1988), singer
- Thomas Adès (born 1971), composer
- Damon Albarn (born 1968), singer-songwriter
- John Alldis (1929–2010), chorus master and conductor
- Lily Allen (born 1985)
- Marc Almond (born 1956), singer of the synth-pop duo Soft Cell
- Marsha Ambrosius (born 1977), singer-songwriter
- Jon Anderson (born 1944), singer-songwriter, co-founder of Yes
- Anne-Marie (born 1990), pop singer-songwriter
- Adam Ant (born 1954), singer
- Gabrielle Aplin (born 1992), singer-songwriter
- Rod Argent (born 1945), keyboardist and founder of The Zombies
- David Arnold (born 1962), composer, musician and film scorer (notably four James Bond films)
- Malcolm Arnold (1921–2006), composer
- James Arthur (born 1988), singer-songwriter
- Quenton Ashlyn, society entertainer
- Rick Astley (born 1966), singer
- Martin Atkins (born 1959), drummer
- Paul Atkinson, (1946—2004) guitarist and member of The Zombies
- Katy B (born 1989), singer
- Mel B (born 1975), singer, member of Spice Girls
- Alexander Baillie (born 1956), cellist
- Cheryl Baker (born 1954), singer and member of Bucks Fizz
- Bryan Balkwill (1922–2007), conductor
- John Barbirolli (1899–1970), conductor
- Gary Barlow (born 1971), singer-songwriter and member of Take That
- Syd Barrett (1946–2006), singer-songwriter, member of the early Pink Floyd
- Fred Barnes (performer) (1885–1938), music hall singer
- Blaze Bayley (born 1963), rock musician and singer
- Norman Beaker (born 1950), blues guitarist, singer-songwriter, producer
- Jazmin Bean (born 2003), singer-songwriter
- Victoria Beckham (born 1974), singer, member of Spice Girls and fashion designer
- David Bedford (1937–2011), composer and musician
- Mark Bedford (born 1961), musician, songwriter and composer, bass guitarist for Madness
- Natasha Bedingfield (born 1981), singer
- Thomas Beecham (1879–1961), conductor
- Matt Bellamy (born 1978), composer for Muse
- Bev Bevan (born 1944), drummer for The Move and Electric Light Orchestra
- Lisa Beznosiuk (born 1956), flautist
- Acker Bilk (1929–2014), clarinettist and vocalist
- Birdy (born 1996), singer-songwriter and pianist
- Roger Birnstingl, bassoonist
- Harrison Birtwistle (1934–2022), composer
- Black (1962–2016), best known for the song Wonderful Life
- Cilla Black (1943–2015), singer and television presenter
- Pauline Black (born 1953), ska singer
- Ritchie Blackmore (born 1945), guitarist, former member of Deep Purple and Rainbow
- Melanie Blatt (born 1975), singer and member of All Saints
- Colin Blunstone (born 1945), singer-songwriter of The Zombies
- James Blunt (born 1977), singer
- John Bonham (1948–1980), drummer for Led Zeppelin
- Dave Gahan (born 1962), singer of Depeche Mode
- Alison Goldfrapp (born 1966), synth-pop singer
- Martin Gore (born 1961), songwriter and founder of Depeche Mode
- Tim Booth (born 1960), singer-songwriter and actor, member of James
- Adrian Boult (1889–1983), conductor
- James Bourne, member of the former rock group Busted, singer-songwriter
- David Bowie (1947–2016), Starman
- William Boyce (1711–1779), composer
- Billy Bragg (born 1957), guitarist and folk singer
- Rosina Brandram (1845–1907), opera singer and actress
- Patricia Bredin (1935–2023), singer
- Havergal Brian (1876–1972), composer
- Frankie Bridge (born 1989), pop singer and member of the bands S Club Juniors and The Saturdays
- Sarah Brightman (born 1960), singer-songwriter, actress, and dancer
- Benjamin Britten (1913–1976), composer and pianist
- Olivia Broadfield (born 1981), singer-songwriter for TV and film
- Justin Broadrick (born 1969), vocalist and guitarist, member of Godflesh and Jesu
- Ian Broudie (born 1958), singer-songwriter member of The Lightning Seeds
- V V Brown (born 1983), indie pop singer
- Mutya Buena (born 1985), singer and member of the band Sugababes
- Jake Bugg (born 1994), singer-songwriter and guitarist
- Emma Bunton (born 1976), singer, member of Spice Girls
- Alexandra Burke (born 1988), singer and actress
- Cat Burns (born 2000), singer-songwriter
- Pete Burns (1959–2016), singer-songwriter and lead vocalist with Dead or Alive
- Tony Burrows (born 1942), pop singer
- Kate Bush (born 1958), singer-songwriter, musician and record producer
- Bilinda Butcher (born 1961), singer-songwriter, vocalist and guitarist of My Bloody Valentine
- Geezer Butler (born 1949), bassist with Black Sabbath
- William Byrd (1543–1623), composer
- Martyn Campbell (born 1970), bassist of The Lightning Seeds
- Joanne Catherall (born 1962), synth-pop singer and member of The Human League
- Les Chadwick (1943–2019), bassist of Gerry and the Pacemakers
- Justin Chancellor (born 1971), bassist, member of Tool
- Melanie C (born 1974), singer, member of Spice Girls
- Lil' Chris (1990–2015), singer
- Eric Clapton (born 1945), singer, guitarist, member of The Yardbirds, John Mayall & the Bluesbreakers, Cream, Blind Faith and Derek and the Dominoes
- Helen Clare (1916–2018), singer
- Allan Clarke (born 1942), lead singer of The Hollies
- Adam Clayton (born 1960), bassist, member of U2
- Cheryl Cole (born 1983), singer, member of Girls Aloud
- Phil Collins (born 1951), musician, member of Genesis
- Imogen Cooper (born 1949), pianist
- David Coverdale (born 1951), singer for Deep Purple and Whitesnake
- Graham Coxon (born 1969), guitarist, singer-songwriter, former member of Blur and solo artist
- Lol Creme (born 1947), guitarist and member of 10cc
- Jamie Cullum (born 1979), jazz singer and musician
- Ian Curtis (1956–1980), lead singer and composer for Joy Division
- Roger Daltrey (born 1944), lead singer of The Who
- Dave Davies (born 1947), lead guitarist with The Kinks
- Peter Maxwell Davies (1934–2016), composer
- Ray Davies (born 1944), singer-songwriter and lead vocalist with The Kinks
- Andrew Davis (born 1944), conductor
- Colin Davis (1927–2013), conductor
- Chris de Burgh (born 1948), singer-songwriter and multi-instrumentalist
- Gervase de Peyer (1926–2017), clarinettist and conductor
- Norman Del Mar (1919–1994), conductor
- Frederick Delius (1862–1934), composer
- Delia Derbyshire (1937–2001), composer of electronic music
- Des'ree (born 1968), soul and pop singer
- Dido (born Florian Cloud de Bounevialle Armstrong, 1971), singer-songwriter
- Pete Doherty, former co-lead singer of The Libertines; current lead singer of Babyshambles; solo artist
- Peter Donohoe (born 1953), pianist
- Eliza Doolittle (born 1988), pop singer
- Lee Dorrian (born 1968), heavy metal musician
- John Dowland (1563-1626), composer of songs
- Nick Drake (1948–1974), singer-songwriter
- Jacqueline du Pré (1945–1987), cellist
- John Dunstaple (1383–1453), composer
- Ian Dury (1942–2000), lyricist and vocalist for The Blockheads
- Ms. Dynamite (born 1981), rapper and singer
- Fleur East (born 1987), singer, rapper and TV presenter
- Perrie Edwards (born 1993), singer and member of Little Mix
- Edward Elgar (1857–1934), composer
- Bobby Elliot (born 1941), drummer and member of The Hollies
- Sophie Ellis-Bextor (born 1979), pop singer-songwriter
- Keith Emerson (1944–2016), keyboardist for The Nice and Emerson, Lake & Palmer
- John Entwistle (1944–2002), bassist for The Who
- Estelle (born 1980), R&B singer
- Example (born 1982), rapper
- Ella Eyre (born 1994), R&B singer
- George Ezra (born 1993), singer-songwriter
- Digby Fairweather (born 1946), jazz musician
- Paloma Faith (born 1981), singer-songwriter
- Marianne Faithfull (1946-2025), singer, actress and chanteuse
- Rebecca Ferguson (born 1986), soul singer and songwriter
- Steve Ferrone (born 1950), session drummer
- Gerald Finzi (1901–1956), composer
- Mick Fleetwood (born 1947), drummer of Fleetwood Mac
- Florrie (born 1988), singer-songwriter and drummer
- Chris Foreman (born 1956), musician, singer-songwriter and composer, guitarist for Madness
- George Formby (1906–1961), wartime entertainer, famous for his playing of the Banjolele and contribution to film
- Foxes (born 1989), pop singer
- Robert Fripp (born 1946), songwriter, guitarist, record producer and founder of King Crimson
- Billy Fury (1940–1983), rock and roll singer
- Peter Gabriel (born 1950), singer-songwriter and former lead vocalist of Genesis
- Gabrielle (born 1969), singer
- Liam Gallagher (born 1972), singer and former lead vocalist of Oasis
- Noel Gallagher (born 1967), singer-songwriter and former member of Oasis
- Lesley Garrett (born 1955), soprano
- Gareth Gates (born 1984), singer
- Boy George (born 1961), singer and lead vocalist of Culture Club
- Andy Gibb (1958–1988), pop singer, brother of the Bee Gees
- Sir Barry Gibb (born 1946), musician, member of the Bee Gees
- Maurice Gibb (1949–2003), musician, member of the Bee Gees
- Robin Gibb (1949–2012), singer-songwriter, member of Bee Gees
- Orlando Gibbons (1583–1625), composer
- Ian Gillan (born 1945), singer for Deep Purple
- David Gilmour (born 1946), guitarist, singer and composer of Pink Floyd
- Girli (born 1997), alternative singer-songwriter
- Jess Glynne (born 1989), pop singer
- Kevin Godley (born 1945), singer-songwriter, drummer and member of 10cc
- Ron Goodwin (1925–2003), composer and conductor
- Debbie Googe (born 1962), bassist of My Bloody Valentine
- Ellie Goulding (born 1986), singer-songwriter, musician
- Graham Gouldman (born 1946), singer-songwriter, bassist and member of 10cc
- Melissa Graham (born 1975), singer-songwriter
- Peter Green (1946-2020), singer-songwriter, original lead guitarist and founder of Fleetwood Mac
- Griff (born 2001), singer
- Hugh Grundy (born 1945), drummer of The Zombies
- Terry Hall (1959–2022), lead singer of the 2-tone band The Specials
- Geri Halliwell (born 1972), singer, member of the Spice Girls
- Natasha Hamilton (born 1982), pop singer and member of Atomic Kitten
- Sarah Harding (1981–2021), singer and member of Girls Aloud
- Bella Hardy (born 1984), folk musician, singer-songwriter
- Dhani Harrison (born 1978), guitarist, son of George Harrison
- George Harrison (1943–2001), musician, composer, member of The Beatles
- PJ Harvey (born 1969), singer-songwriter, guitarist
- Eric Haydock (1943—2019), bass guitarist and member of The Hollies
- Imogen Heap (born 1977), singer and musician
- Matty Healy (born 1989), lead singer of indie-rock band The 1975
- Ella Henderson (born 1996), pop singer
- Anthony Hewitt (born 1971), pianist
- Tony Hicks (born 1945), lead guitarist of The Hollies
- Becky Hill (born 1994), dance-pop singer-songwriter
- Steve Hogarth (born 1959), songwriter, musician and lead singer of the band Marillion
- Gustav Holst (1874–1934), composer
- Dominic Howard (born 1977), member of Muse
- Glenn Hughes (born 1951), briefly of bands Deep Purple and Black Sabbath
- Rochelle Humes (born 1989), pop singer and member of the bands S Club Juniors and The Saturdays
- Paul Humphreys (born 1960), keyboardist and co-founder of Orchestral Manoeuvres in the Dark
- Tony Iommi (born 1948), guitarist and co-founder of Black Sabbath
- John Ireland (1879–1962), composer
- Robert Irving (1913–1991), conductor
- JAY1 (born 1998), rapper and songwriter
- Jessie J (born 1988), singer-songwriter
- Sir Mick Jagger (born 1943), rock singer and frontman of The Rolling Stones
- Sir Elton John (born 1947), singer-songwriter and pianist
- Brian Johnson (born 1947), singer, lead vocalist with AC/DC, former member of Geordie
- Brian Jones (1942–1969), musician and founder of The Rolling Stones
- Davy Jones (1945–2012), singer/percussionist, member of The Monkees
- Howard Jones (born 1955), singer and songwriter
- John Paul Jones (born 1946), bassist, mandolinist and keyboardist for Led Zeppelin
- Samantha Jones (born 1943), singer
- Kerry Katona (born 1980), pop singer and member of Atomic Kitten
- Nigel Kennedy (born 1956), violinist
- Mollie King (born 1987), singer and member of The Saturdays
- Thea King (1925–2007), clarinettist
- Danny Kirwan (1950-2018), original singer-songwriter and guitarist of Fleetwood Mac
- Beverley Knight (born 1973), singer and actress
- David Knopfler (born 1952), musician and former rhythm guitarist with Dire Straits
- Mark Knopfler (born 1949), musician, songwriter and co-founder of Dire Straits
- Sonja Kristina (born 1949), rock singer
- La Roux (born 1988), synth-pop musician and singer
- Lady Sovereign (born 1985), rapper and singer
- Greg Lake (1947–2016), musician, songwriter, bassist of King Crimson and Emerson, Lake & Palmer
- Adrian Lambert (born 1976), bassist
- Jen Ledger (born 1989), drummer and backing vocalist for Skillet
- Albert Lee (born 1943), guitarist
- John Lennon (1940–1980), singer-songwriter, co-founder of The Beatles
- Leona Lewis (born 1985), singer-songwriter
- Shaznay Lewis (born 1975), singer and member of All Saints
- Cher Lloyd (born 1993), singer
- Andrew Lloyd Webber (born 1948), composer of musicals
- Julian Lloyd Webber (born 1951), cellist
- Pixie Lott (born 1991), singer
- Chris Lowe (born 1959), keyboardist and composer, member of Pet Shop Boys
- Pearl Lowe (born 1970), singer-songwriter and textiles designer
- Dua Lipa (born 1995), singer-songwriter
- Vera Lynn (1917–2020), singer and entertainer
- Les Maguire (born 1941), pianist for Gerry and the Pacemakers
- Ella Mai (born 1994), singer-songwriter
- Zayn Malik (born 1993), member of One Direction
- Jane Manning (1938–2021), opera soprano
- Clint Mansell (born 1963), lead singer of rock band Pop Will Eat Itself
- Gerry Marsden (1942–2021), leader of Gerry and the Pacemakers
- Chris Martin (born 1977), singer-songwriter, co-founder of Coldplay
- Hank Marvin (born 1941), guitarist, member of The Shadows
- Glen Matlock (born 1956), original bass guitarist of the Sex Pistols
- Sir Brian May (born 1947), musician, astrophysicist and lead guitarist with Queen
- Sir Paul McCartney (born 1942), singer-songwriter, guitarist, co-founder of The Beatles
- Liz McClarnon (born 1981), pop singer and member of Atomic Kitten
- Andy McCluskey (born 1959), singer and co-founder of Orchestral Manoeuvres in the Dark
- Jane McDonald (born 1963), singer and TV personality
- Declan McKenna (born 1998), singer
- Graham McPherson (born 1961), aka Suggs, lead vocalist of Madness
- Christine McVie (1943–2022), singer, pianist and member of Fleetwood Mac
- John McVie (born 1945), bass guitarist and member of Fleetwood Mac
- M.I.A. (born 1975), rapper and singer
- George Michael (1963–2016), singer-songwriter, former member of Wham!
- Tony Mills (1962–2019), singer and guitarist, member of Shy
- Keith Moon (1946–1978), drummer for The Who
- Gary Moore (1952–2011), blues guitarist, briefly in Thin Lizzy
- Thomas Morley (1557–1602), consort composer
- Gareth Morris (1920–2007), flautist
- Morrissey (born 1959), composer, member of The Smiths
- Alison Moyet (born 1961), singer-songwriter
- May Mukle (1880–1963), cellist
- Olly Murs (born 1984), pop singer
- Billie Myers (born 1971), pop singer
- Graham Nash (born 1942), singer-songwriter, guitarist and original member of The Hollies
- Kate Nash (born 1987), singer and actress
- Jesy Nelson (born 1991), singer and member of Little Mix
- Olivia Newton-John (1948–2022), pop star
- Nadia Oh (born 1990), rapper
- Hazel O'Connor (born 1954), singer-songwriter
- John Ogdon (1937–1989), pianist
- Mike Oldfield (born 1953), composer and instrumentalist
- Daphne Oram (1925–2003), electronic composer
- Beth Orton (born 1970), singer-songwriter
- Ozzy Osbourne (1948–2025), singer and former lead vocalist for Black Sabbath
- Jacquie O'Sullivan (born 1960), singer and member of Bananarama
- Jimmy Page (born 1944), guitarist and co-founder of Led Zeppelin
- Carl Palmer (born 1950), drummer for Atomic Rooster, Emerson, Lake & Palmer, and Asia
- Leigh-Anne Pinnock (born 1991), singer and member of Little Mix
- Panjabi MC (born 1970), recording artist, rapper and DJ
- Hubert Parry (1848–1918), composer
- Alan Parsons (born 1948), composer and musician
- Liam Payne (1993–2024), member of One Direction
- Peter Pears (1910–1986), tenor
- Alf Pearson (1910-2012), singer
- Bob Pearson (1907–1985), singer and pianist
- Robert Plant (born 1948), singer, former lead vocalist for Led Zeppelin
- Anthony Pleeth (born 1948), cellist
- Cozy Powell (1947–1998), drummer for Rainbow, Emerson, Lake & Powell and Black Sabbath
- Stephen Preston, flautist
- Henry Purcell (1659–1695), composer
- Corinne Bailey Rae (born 1970), singer-songwriter
- Simon Rattle (born 1955), conductor
- Raye (born 1997), soul singer-songwriter
- Keith Richards (born 1943), guitarist and member of the Rolling Stones
- Nicola Roberts (born 1985), singer and member of Girls Aloud
- Paul Rodgers (born 1949), singer, member of Free and Bad Company
- Samantha Ronson (born 1977), DJ and singer
- Martin Roscoe (born 1952), pianist
- Emeli Sandé (born 1987), R&B singer
- Malcolm Sargent (1895–1967), conductor
- 21 Savage (born 1992), rapper, record producer
- Chris Sharrock (born 1964), drummer for Noel Gallagher's High Flying Birds
- Ed Sheeran (born 1991), singer-songwriter
- Tony Sheridan (1940–2013), rock musician
- Siouxsie Sioux (born 1957), new-wave and alternative rock singer, member of Siouxsie and the Banshees
- Skin (born 1967), rock singer
- Sam Smith (born 1992), singer-songwriter
- Elsie Southgate (1880–1946), violinist
- Jeremy Spencer (born 1948), original slide guitarist of Fleetwood Mac
- Lucy Spraggan (born 1991), acoustic singer
- Zak Starkey (born 1965), drummer, son of Ringo Starr
- Sir Ringo Starr (born 1940), drummer, member of The Beatles
- Crispin Steele-Perkins (born 1944), trumpeter
- Eric Stewart (born 1945), singer-songwriter, keyboardist, multi-instrumentalist, record producer of 10cc
- Rod Stewart (born 1945), singer
- Sting (born 1951), singer-songwriter, guitarist
- Joss Stone (born 1987), singer
- Stormzy (born 1993), rapper and grime artist
- Joe Strummer (1952–2002), singer, member of The Clash
- Amy Studt (born 1986), singer-songwriter and pianist
- Harry Styles (born 1994), singer, member of One Direction
- Bernard Sumner, lead singer of New Order
- Oli Sykes (born 1986), rock singer and member of Bring Me the Horizon
- Connie Talbot (born 2000), child singer and reality star
- Thomas Tallis (1505–1585), composer
- Benson Taylor (born 1983), composer
- Tinie Tempah (born 1988), rapper
- Neil Tennant (born 1954), vocalist, member of Pet Shop Boys
- Lionel Tertis (1876–1975), violist
- Jade Thirlwall (born 1992), singer and member of Little Mix
- Frederick Thurston (1901–1953), clarinettist
- Lee Thompson (born 1957), multi-instrumentalist, songwriter and composer, founder and saxophonist of Madness
- Michael Tippett (1905–1998), composer
- Louis Tomlinson (born 1991), member of One Direction
- Pete Townshend (born 1945), guitarist and songwriter with The Who
- Faye Tozer (born 1975), pop singer, member of Steps
- Viola Tunnard (1916–1974), pianist
- Alex Turner, leader singer of the band Arctic Monkeys
- Joseph Vernon (1738–1782), boy soprano
- Diana Vickers (born 1991), pop singer
- Sid Vicious (1957–1979), bassist for Sex Pistols
- Rick Wakeman (born 1949), piano, keyboardist, musician
- Ricky Walters (born 1965), aka rapper Slick Rick
- William Walton (1902–1983), composer
- Kimberley Walsh (born 1981), singer and member of Girls Aloud
- Bill Ward (born 1948), drummer for Black Sabbath
- Jessie Ware (born 1984), singer
- Roger Waters (born 1943), founder of Pink Floyd
- Charlie Watts (1941–2021), drummer for The Rolling Stones
- Russell Watson (born 1966), tenor
- Thomas Weelkes (1575–1623), composer
- Florence Welch (born 1986), lead singer of Florence and The Machine
- John Wilbye (1574–1638), composer
- Kim Wilde (born 1960), new-wave singer
- Toyah Willcox (born 1958), singer-songwriter and actress
- Cliff Williams (born 1949), bassist for AC/DC
- Ralph Vaughan Williams (1872–1958), composer
- Robbie Williams (born 1974), singer, former member of Take That
- Steven Wilson (born 1967), musician, producer, composer and founder of Porcupine Tree
- Ronnie Wood (born 1947), guitarist with the Rolling Stones, former member of Small Faces
- Roy Wood (born 1946), lead singer, guitarist, multi-instrumentalist and co-founder of The Move, Electric Light Orchestra and Wizzard
- Keren Woodward (born 1961), singer and member of Bananarama
- Amy Winehouse (1983–2011), singer-songwriter
- Chris Wolstenholme (born 1978), member of Muse
- Henry Wood (1869–1944), conductor
- Dan Woodgate (born 1960), musician, songwriter, composer and record producer, drummer for Madness
- Charli XCX (born 1992), singer-songwriter
- Thom Yorke (born 1968), singer-songwriter, musician, member of Radiohead
- Lola Young (born 2001), singer
- Marvin Young (born 1967), aka rapper Young MC

== Philosophers ==
- Donald Adamson (born 1939)
- G. E. M. Anscombe (1919–2001), philosopher
- Anselm of Canterbury (1033–1109), philosopher, famous for creation of the Ontological Argument
- A. J. Ayer (1910–1989), philosopher
- Francis Bacon (1561–1626), philosopher and essayist
- Roger Bacon (1214–1294), medieval philosopher, alchemist, and theologian
- Jeremy Bentham (1748–1832), philosopher, founder of Utilitarianism
- R. M. Hare (1907–2002), philosopher
- H. L. A. Hart (1907–1992), legal philosopher
- Thomas Hobbes (1588–1679), philosopher
- William Godwin (1756–1836), political philosopher
- John Locke, (1632–1704) author
- Harriet Taylor Mill (1807–1858), philosopher and women's rights advocate
- John Stuart Mill (1806–1873), economist, political philosopher
- G. E. Moore (1873–1958), philosopher
- William of Ockham (c. 1285 – 1349), philosopher, theologian, created Ockham's Razor
- Thomas Paine, (1737–1809) theorist
- Derek Parfit (1942–2017), philosopher
- Nina Power (born 1978), philosopher
- Bertrand Russell (1872–1970), philosopher
- Gilbert Ryle (1900–1976), philosopher
- Henry Sidgwick (1838–1900), philosopher
- Herbert Spencer (1820–1903)
- Peter Strawson (1919–2006), philosopher
- William Whewell (1794–1866), philosopher
- Alfred North Whitehead (1861–1947), mathematician
- Bernard Williams (1929–2003), philosopher
- Mary Wollstonecraft (1759–1797), philosopher and women's rights advocate

== Photographers ==
- David Bailey (born 1938)
- Emma Barton (1872–1938)
- Cecil Beaton (1904–1980)
- George Beldam (1868–1937), first-class cricketer and a pioneer of action photography in sport
- John Blakemore (born 1936)
- Samuel Bourne (1834–1912)
- Larry Burrows (1926–1971), photojournalist
- George Davison (1854–1930)
- Terence Donovan (1936–1996)
- Brian Duffy (1933–2010)
- Frederick H. Evans (1853–1943)
- Roger Fenton (1819–1869)
- John French (1907–1966)
- Francis Frith (1822–1898)
- Peter Wickens Fry (1798–1860), early amateur photographer
- Bert Hardy (1913–1995)
- Alfred Horsley Hinton (1863–1908)
- Don McCullin (born 1935), photojournalist
- Eadweard Muybridge (1830–1904)
- Horace Nicholls (1867–1941)
- Tony Ray-Jones (1941–1972)
- Henry Peach Robinson (1830–1901)
- George Rodger (1908–1995), photojournalist
- Francis Meadow Sutcliffe (1853–1941)
- William Henry Fox Talbot (1800–1877), photographer, inventor of the calotype process

== Politicians ==
- Diane Abbott (born 1953), Labour politician
- Bob Ainsworth (born 1952), Labour politician
- John FitzAlan, 1st Baron Arundel (1348–1379)
- Edmund FitzAlan, 9th Earl of Arundel (1285–1326)
- Richard FitzAlan, 10th Earl of Arundel (1306–1376)
- H. H. Asquith (1852–1928), British prime minister
- Clement Attlee (1883–1967), British prime minister
- Kemi Badenoch (born 1980), Leader of the Conservative Party
- Stanley Baldwin (1867–1947), British prime minister
- Ed Balls (born 1967), Labour politician
- John Barrington, 1st Viscount Barrington (1678–1734)
- Charles George Beauclerk (1774–1845)
- Lord Sidney Beauclerk (1703–1744)
- Margaret Beckett (born 1943), Labour politician
- Tony Benn (1925–2014), Labour politician
- Ernest Bevin (1881–1951), Labour politician
- Margaret Bondfield (1873–1953), Labour politician and first female Cabinet Minister
- Betty Boothroyd (1929–2023), Speaker of the House of Commons
- Harold Briggs (1870–1945)
- John Bright (1811–1889), liberal politician
- Sir Paul Bryan (1913–2004)
- Dorothy Boyle, Countess of Burlington (1699–1758)
- James Callaghan (1912–2005), British prime minister
- David Cameron (born 1966), British prime minister
- Alastair Campbell (born 1957), political aide
- George Canning (1770–1827), politician
- William Cartwright (1634–1676), politician
- Barbara Castle (1910–2002), politician
- Lord Henry Cavendish (1673–1700), nobleman and politician
- Sir Austen Chamberlain (1863–1937)
- Joseph Chamberlain (1836–1914)
- Neville Chamberlain (1869–1940), British prime minister
- James Chase (1650–1721)
- Lord Randolph Churchill (1849–1895)
- Winston Churchill (1874–1965), British prime minister
- Lionel of Antwerp, 1st Duke of Clarence (1338–1368)
- Kenneth Clarke (born 1940), Conservative politician
- Nick Clegg (born 1967), Liberal Democrat politician
- William Cobbett (1763–1835), MP and reformer
- Daisy Cooper (born 1981), Liberal Democrat politician
- Jeremy Corbyn (born 1949), Labour politician
- Sir Stafford Cripps (1889–1952), Labour politician
- George Nathaniel Curzon, 1st Marquess Curzon of Kedleston (1859–1925), Viceroy of India
- Archibald Dalzel (1740–1811), Governor of the Gold Coast
- Ed Davey (born 1965), Liberal Democrat politician
- Edward Henry Stanley, 15th Earl of Derby (1826–1893)
- Edward Smith-Stanley, 14th Earl of Derby (1799–1869)
- William Cavendish, 1st Duke of Devonshire (1640–1707), soldier, nobleman, and Whig politician
- Spencer Compton Cavendish, 8th Duke of Devonshire (1833–1908)
- William Cavendish, 4th Duke of Devonshire (c. 1720 – 1764)
- Benjamin Disraeli (1804–1881), British prime minister
- Anneliese Dodds (born 1978), Labour politician
- Alec Douglas-Home (1903–1995), British prime minister
- Anthony Eden (1897–1977), British prime minister
- Ferdinando Fairfax, 2nd Lord Fairfax of Cameron (1584–1648), nobleman and politician, also a commander in the Parliamentary army in the English Civil War
- Michael Foot (1913–2010), Labour leader
- Vicky Ford (born 1967), Conservative politician
- William Bower Forwood (1840–1928), politician
- Sir Henry Bartle Frere (1815–1884), Colonial administrator
- Hugh Gaitskell (1906–1963), Labour politician
- William Ewart Gladstone (1809–1898), British prime minister
- Augustus Henry Fitzroy, 3rd Duke of Grafton (1735–1811)
- George Grenville (1712–1770), British prime minister
- William Wyndham Grenville, 1st Lord Grenville (1759–1834)
- Charles Grey, 2nd Earl Grey (1764–1845)
- William Hague (born 1961), Conservative politician
- William Savile, 2nd Marquess of Halifax (1665–1700)
- James Hamilton, Viscount Hamilton (1786–1814), nobleman and politician
- Harriet Harman (born 1950), Labour politician
- Judith Hart (1924–1991), Labour politician
- Denis Healey (1917–2015), Labour politician
- Edward Heath (1916–2005), British prime minister
- Henry Vassall-Fox, 3rd Baron Holland (1773–1840)
- Boris Johnson (born 1964), British prime minister
- William Kenrick (1831–1919)
- Sadiq Khan (born 1970), Mayor of London
- Edmund Holland, 4th Earl of Kent (1384–1408)
- John Wodehouse, 1st Earl of Kimberley (1826–1902)
- Brownlow William Knox (1806–1873)
- George Lansbury (1859–1940)
- Nigel Lawson (1932–2023), Conservative politician
- Sir Francis Lee, 4th Baronet (1639–1667)
- John Leland (?–1808), English Member of Parliament for Stamford, 1796–1808
- Granville George Leveson-Gower, 2nd Earl Granville (1815–1891)
- John de Lacy, 2nd Earl of Lincoln (c. 1192 – 1240)
- Henry de Lacy, 3rd Earl of Lincoln (c. 1251 – 1311)
- Robert Banks Jenkinson, 2nd Earl of Liverpool (1770–1828)
- Ken Livingstone (born 1945), Mayor of London
- Rebecca Long-Bailey (born 1979), Labour politician
- John Lubbock (1834–1913), banker, politician, naturalist and archaeologist
- Caroline Lucas (born 1960), leader of the Green Party
- Harold Macmillan (1894–1986), British prime minister
- John Major (born 1943), British prime minister
- Reginald Maudling (1917–1979), Conservative politician
- Ed Miliband (born 1969), Labour politician
- William Lamb, 2nd Viscount Melbourne (1779–1848)
- Herbert Morrison (1888–1965), Labour politician
- Mo Mowlam (1949–2005), Labour politician
- Reginald Maudling (1917–1979), Conservative politician
- Theresa May (born 1956), British Prime Minister
- Herbert Morrison (1888–1965), Labour politician
- Thomas Pelham-Holles, 1st Duke of Newcastle (1693–1768)
- Frederick North, Lord North (1732–1792)
- Philip Oliver (1884–1954)
- George Osborne (born 1971), Conservative politician
- Henry John Temple, 3rd Viscount Palmerston (1784–1865), British prime minister
- Henry Parkes (1815–1896), statesman and founder of modern Australia
- Sir Robert Peel (1788–1850), British prime minister
- Henry Pelham (1694–1754), British prime minister
- Gilbert de Clare, 1st Earl of Pembroke (c. 1100 – 1148)
- William Marshal, 1st Earl of Pembroke (1146/1147–1219)
- Richard de Clare, 2nd Earl of Pembroke (1130–1176)
- Spencer Perceval (1762–1812), British prime minister
- William Pitt (the Elder), 1st Earl of Chatham (1708–1778)
- William Pitt the Younger (1759–1806), British prime minister
- William Cavendish-Bentinck, 3rd Duke of Portland (1738–1809)
- Enoch Powell (1912–1998)
- John Prescott (1938–2024), Labour politician
- Dominic Raab (born 1974), Conservative politician
- Angela Rayner (born 1980), Labour politician
- Rachel Reeves (born 1979), Labour politician
- Cecil Rhodes, (1853–1902)
- Frederick John Robinson, 1st Earl of Ripon (1782–1859), politician
- William Robson, Baron Robson (1852–1918)
- Charles Watson-Wentworth, 2nd Marquess of Rockingham (1730–1782)
- Sir Thomas Royden, 1st Baronet (1831–1917), ship-owner and Conservative Party politician
- Thomas Royden, 1st Baron Royden (1871–1950), businessman and Conservative Party politician
- Amber Rudd (born 1963), Conservative politician
- John Russell, 1st Earl Russell (1792–1878)
- Samuel Sandys, 1st Baron Sandys (1695–1770), British prime minister
- Michael Hicks-Beach, 1st Earl St Aldwyn (1837–1916)
- Robert Arthur Talbot Gascoyne-Cecil, 3rd Marquess of Salisbury (1830–1903), British prime minister
- Henry Addington, 1st Viscount Sidmouth (1757–1844)
- John Simon, 1st Viscount Simon (1873–1954)
- John Smith (1938–1994), Labour politician
- Philip Snowden, 1st Viscount Snowden of Ickornshaw (1864–1937)
- Charles Beauclerk, 1st Duke of St Albans (1670–1726)
- Keir Starmer (born 1962), British prime minister
- Zarah Sultana (born 1993)
- Rishi Sunak (born 1980), British prime minister
- John de Warenne, 6th Earl of Surrey (1231–1304)
- Margaret Thatcher, (1925–2013), British prime minister
- Thomas Townshend, 1st Viscount Sydney (1733–1800), Home Secretary in the Pitt government; suggested using what is now Australia as a penal colony for Britain
- Liz Truss (born 1975), British prime minister
- Sir Robert Walpole (1676–1745), British prime minister
- Sir Godfrey Webster, 4th Baronet (1747–1800)
- Sir Godfrey Webster, 5th Baronet (1789–1836)
- William Wilberforce, (1759–1833) abolitionist and politician
- Ellen Wilkinson (1891–1947), Labour politician
- William Willoughby, 5th Baron Willoughby de Eresby (c. 1370 – 1409)
- Robert Willoughby, 6th Baron Willoughby de Eresby (c. 1385 – 1452)
- Shirley Williams (1930–2021), SDP founder
- Henry Willink (1894–1973), politician
- Spencer Compton, 1st Earl of Wilmington (c. 1674 – 1743)
- Harold Wilson (1916–1995), British prime minister
- Edward Maria Wingfield (1550–1631), also soldier and English colonist in America

== Religious figures ==
- Pope Adrian IV (c. 1100 – 1159), only English Pope
- Æthelwold of Winchester (909–984), Bishop of Winchester
- Thomas Arundel (1353–1414), Archbishop of Canterbury
- Richard Bancroft (1544–1610), Archbishop of Canterbury
- Richard Barnes (1532–1587), bishop
- Archbishop Lawrence Booth, of York (1420–1480)
- Thomas Cobham (died 1327), Archbishop-elect of Canterbury, Bishop of Worcester
- William Charles Cotton (1813–1879), missionary and beekeeper
- Thomas Cranmer (1489–1556), Archbishop of Canterbury
- William Edington (died 1366), Bishop of Winchester
- William Howley (1766–1848), Archbishop of Canterbury
- Trevor Huddleston (1913–1998), anti-Apartheid activist
- Simon Islip (died 1366), Archbishop of Canterbury
- Simon Langham (1310–1376), Archbishop of Canterbury
- John Leland (1691–1766), Presbyterian minister
- Henry Mackenzie (1808–1878), Anglican Bishop of Nottingham
- Walter Maidstone (died 1317), Bishop of Worcester
- Simon Mepeham (died 1333), Archbishop of Canterbury
- John Henry Newman (1801–1890), Catholic cardinal
- Adam Orleton (died 1345), Bishop of Winchester
- Plegmund (died 923), Archbishop of Canterbury
- Walter Reynolds (died 1327), Bishop of Worcester, Archbishop of Canterbury
- William Smyth (c. 1460 – 1514), bishop
- Charles Spurgeon (1834–1892), Particular Baptist minister
- John de Stratford (c. 1275 – 1348), Archbishop of Canterbury, Bishop of Winchester
- Simon Sudbury (died 1381), Archbishop of Canterbury
- Joshua Toulmin (1740–1815), radical dissenting minister
- John Wesley (1703–1791), Methodist minister and evangelist
- Wilfrid (633-709/710), Bishop of York
- William Whittlesey (died 1374), Bishop of Rochester, Bishop of Worcester, Archbishop of Canterbury
- William Williams (1800–1878), Bishop of Waiapu
- Ñāṇamoli Bhikkhu (1905–1960), Theravada Buddhist monk and translator of Pali literature
- Ñāṇavīra Thera (1920–1965), Theravada Buddhist monk and known as the author of Notes on Dhamma
- Ajahn Amaro (born 1956), Abbot of Amaravati Buddhist Monastery
- Ajahn Khemadhammo (born 1944), founder and director of "Angulimala, the Buddhist Prison Chaplaincy"
- Ajahn Sucitto (born 1949), former abbot of Chithurst Buddhist Monastery

== Revolutionaries ==
- Robert Aske (c. 1500 – 1537), revolutionary leader of the Pilgrimage of Grace
- Thomas Baker (d. 1381), leader of the Peasants' Revolt
- John Ball (c. 1338 –1381), English priest and revolutionary leader of the Peasants' Revolt
- Boudica (died 60/61), Queen of the Icini, led a revolt against the Roman Empire
- Robert Catesby (1572–1605), lead planner of the Gunpowder Plot
- Oliver Cromwell (1599–1658), Parliamentarian leader and Lord Protector of England
- Guy Fawkes (1570–1606), central participant in the Gunpowder Plot
- Arthur Thistlewood (1774–1820), radical activist and conspirator
- Thomas Wyatt the Younger (1521–1554), leader of Wyatt's rebellion

== Scientists ==
- Arthur Aikin (1773–1854), chemist and mineralogist
- Nathan Alcock (1707–1779), doctor
- Jim Al-Khalili (born 1962), theoretical physicist and broadcaster
- Sir Edward Appleton (1892–1965), physicist
- Charles Babbage (1791–1871), mathematician
- Joseph Banks (1743–1820), naturalist
- Isaac Barrow (1630–1677), mathematician
- Derek Barton (1918–1998), organic chemist
- Thomas Bayes (c. 1702 – 1761), mathematician
- Diana Beck (1902–1956), neurosurgeon
- Jocelyn Bell (born 1943), radio astronomer and discoverer of pulsars
- Tim Berners-Lee (born 1955), computer scientist; inventor of the World Wide Web
- Patrick Maynard Stuart Blackett (1897–1974), physicist
- George Boole (1815–1864), mathematician
- Robert Boyle (1627–1691), natural philosopher
- William Henry Bragg (1862–1942), crystallographer
- Richard Bright (1630–1677), doctor, founder of Bright's Disease (a form of kidney disease)
- Henry Brunner (1838–1916), chemist
- Henry Cavendish (1731–1810), scientist
- Sir George Cayley (1773–1857), polymath and aviator
- Joan Clarke (1917–1996), cryptanalyst
- Frank Close (born 1945), physicist
- Brian Cox (born 1968), physicist
- Francis Crick (1916–2004), molecular biologist
- John Dalton (1766–1844), chemist and physicist
- Charles Darwin (1809–1882), initiator of the theory of evolution
- Richard Dawkins (born 1941), evolutionary theorist
- Henry Deacon (1822–1876), chemist
- Andrew Digby (born 1975), astronomer and ecologist
- Paul Dirac (1902–1984), physicist
- Horace Donisthorpe (1870–1951), entomologist, myrmecologist and coleopterist
- Arthur Eddington (1882–1944), physicist
- Michael Faraday (1791–1867), scientist
- Ronald Fisher (1890–1962), geneticist and statistician
- Jeff Forshaw (born 1968), particle physicist
- Rosalind Franklin (1920–1958), chemist and x-ray crystallographer
- J. B. S. Haldane (1892–1964), geneticist
- James Hargreaves (1834–1915), chemist
- Alfred Harker (1859–1939), petrologist
- Stephen Hawking (1942–2018), cosmologist
- Oliver Heaviside (1850–1925), physicist
- John Herschel (1792–1871), mathematician and astronomer
- Antony Hewish (1924–2021), radio astronomer
- Peter Higgs (1929–2024), physicist
- C. A. R. Hoare (born 1934), computer scientist
- Robert Hooke (1635–1703), scientist
- Daphne Jackson (1936–1991), nuclear physicist
- Edward Jenner (1749–1823), doctor
- R. V. Jones (1911–1997), physicist
- James Prescott Joule (1818–1889), physicist
- Hilda Judd (1882–1951), biochemist
- John Kendrew (1917–1997), biochemist
- Ernest Kennaway (1881–1958), pathologist
- Harry Kroto (1939–2016), chemist
- Joseph Lister (1827–1912), surgeon
- Bernard Lovell (1913–2012), astronomer
- Ada Lovelace (1815–1852), mathematician and computing pioneer
- James Lovelock (1919–2022), scientist
- Martin Lowry (1874–1936), chemist
- John William Lubbock (1803–1865), banker, mathematician and astronomer
- Sir Charles Lyell (1797–1875), geologist
- John Maynard Smith (1920–2004), geneticist
- John McClellan (1810–1881), chemist
- Anne McLaren (1927–2007), developmental biologist
- Robert Mond (1867–1938), chemist
- Desmond Morris (born 1928), zoologist
- Nevill Mott (1905–1996), theoretical physicist
- Roger Needham (1935–2003), computer scientist
- David Nelson (born 1938), mathematician
- Sir Isaac Newton (1642–1727), founder of modern physics, last of the alchemists
- William Penney (1909–1991), mathematician, physicist, director of British nuclear weapon research
- Roger Penrose (born 1931), mathematical physicist
- Joseph Prestwich (1812–1896), geologist
- Joseph Priestley (1733–1804), chemist
- Emma Amy Rea (1865–1927), mycologist
- Martin Rees (born 1942), cosmologist and astrophysicist
- Frederick Sanger (1918–2013), double Nobel prize-winning molecular biologist
- Adam Sedgwick (1785–1873), geologist
- John Snow (1813–1858), epidemiologist
- Audrey Stuckes (1923–2006), material scientist
- Joseph Wilson Swan (1828–1914), physicist and chemist
- George Paget Thomson (1892–1975), physicist
- J. J. Thomson (1856–1940), physicist
- Henry Tizard (1885–1959), chemist and inventor
- Alan Turing (1912–1954), mathematician
- John Venn (1834–1923), mathematician
- Alfred Russel Wallace (1823–1913), naturalist
- Kevin Warwick (born 1954), cybernetics scientist
- Alfred North Whitehead (1861–1947), mathematician
- Elsie Widdowson (1906–2000), dietitian and nutritionist
- Maurice Vincent Wilkes (1913–2010), computer scientist
- Geoffrey Wilkinson (1921–1996), inorganic chemist
- James H. Wilkinson (1919–1986), mathematician
- Christine Williams (BSc 1973), nutritionist
- Elizabeth Williamson (fl. 1978), pharmacist
- William Hyde Wollaston (1766–1828), chemist
- Thomas Young (1773–1829), scientist

== Other notables ==
- Hannah Aldworth (died 1778), philanthropist
- Margery Arnold (fl. mid 14th century), landowner
- Rachel Ashwell (born 1959), author, designer and entrepreneur
- John Brasbrigg or Bracebrigge (fl. 1428), English book collector
- Thomas Brassey (1805–1870), civil engineering contractor
- Capability Brown (1715–1783), landscape gardener
- Donald Campbell (1921–1967), world land and water speed record holder
- Sir Malcolm Campbell (1885–1949), automobile and speedboat racer
- William Caxton (c. 1422 – c. 1491), printer
- Sir John Chesshyre (1662–1738), lawyer
- Grace Darling (1815–1842), heroine
- Emily Wilding Davison (1872–1913), suffragette
- William Emes (c. 1729 – 1803), landscape gardener
- Millicent Fawcett (1847–1929), suffragist
- Elizabeth Fry (1780–1845), prison reformer
- Thomas Grissell (1801–1874), public works contractor
- Lady Elizabeth Hastings (1682–1739), philanthropist
- Alice la Haubergere (fl. 1271–1310), earliest known female blacksmith in England
- Natasha Hausdorff (born 1989), barrister, international news commentator, and Israel advocate
- Hilda Hewlett (1864–1943), pioneer aviator and aviation entrepreneur
- Ebenezer Howard (1850–1928), urban planner
- Daniel Howell (born 1991), YouTube personality and radio host
- Edward Kemp (1817–1891), garden designer
- Gideon Lester (born 1972), dramaturg, adaptator, theatre artistic director
- Philip Lester (born 1987), YouTube personality and radio host
- Peter Molyneux (born 1959), video game designer
- Joshua A. Norton (1811–1880), Emperor of the United States and Protector of Mexico
- Emmeline Pankhurst (1858–1928), suffragette
- Mary Robinson (Maid of Buttermere) (1778–1837), shepherdess and deceived wife
- Nadine Senior (1939–2016), dance educator
- Wat Tyler (died 1381), leader of the Peasants' Revolt (1381)
- William Wakefield (1801–1848), founder of Wellington, New Zealand
- Richard Walker (1918–1985), writer and pioneer of modern-day angling in Britain
- Jeremy Wade (born 23 March 1956), television presenter, angler and a biologist.
- Sarah Elizabeth Wardroper (1814–1892), Matron of St Thomas's Hospital from 1854 to 1887
- Harriet Shaw Weaver (1876–1961), political activist and suffragist
- Henrietta Stanley, 1807–1895, campaigner for women's education
- Joseph Williamson (1769–1840), philanthropist, merchant and tunneler
- Mary Jane Wilson (1840–1916), religious sister and venerable
- Philip Yates (1913–1998), coal miner awarded the Edward Medal
- Annie Henrietta Yorke (1844–1926), philanthropist and reformer

=== English expatriates ===
The following were born English, but changed or acquired an additional citizenship later in their life. Note that UK citizens are not required by the UK government to relinquish their citizenship if they acquire another, although this has not always been universal, and some countries do require (or have required) new citizens to relinquish any old citizenships.

- John Alden (c. 1599 – 1687), one of the leaders of the Pilgrims to North America
- George Alsop, (c. 1630s-c. 1670s), author
- Anthony Aston (died 1731), actor and dramatist
- Alistair Cooke (1908–2004)
- Cary Grant (1904–1986), film actor
- Avraham Harman (1915–1992), Israeli diplomat and president of the Hebrew University of Jerusalem
- Bob Hope (1903–2003)
- Stephen Hough (born 1961), concert pianist, became an Australian citizen
- Mary Stanley Low (1912–2007), political activist, writer, and educator became a Cuban citizen
- Thomas Paine (1737–1809) became a citizen of Pennsylvania

== See also ==
- List of people by nationality
- List of Cornish people
- List of Northern Irish people
- List of Scots
- List of Welsh people
- List of bishops in the Church of England
