= Rutherston =

Rutherston is a surname. Notable people with the surname include:

- Albert Rutherston (1881–1953), British artist
- Jeanette Rutherston (1902–1988), British dancer and television critic
