= Trudl Dubsky =

Austrian-American innovative dancer, choreographer and teacher

- Born: Gertruda Rosa Josefine Dubsky; 31 January 1913; Vienna
- Died: July 3, 1976 (aged 63); Los Angeles
- Occupation(s): Dancer, dance educator, visual artist
- Spouse: Herbert Zipper (married 1939)

Trudl Dubsky Zipper (31 January 1913 – 3 July 1976), born Gertruda Dubsky, was an Austrian-American innovative dancer, choreographer and teacher.

== Early life and education ==
Gertruda Rosa Josefine Dubsky was born in Vienna, the daughter of Wilhelm Josef Dubsky and Maria Theresia Dubsky. She trained and performed with the Bodenwieser School and was renowned for her dynamic modern dancing and high leaps.

== Career ==
In 1932, with fellow Bodenwieser student Jeanette Rutherston, Dubsky co-founded the Rutherston-Dubsky School in London. She moved to the Philippines in 1937, to dance and teach. She founded the Manila Ballet Moderne during her time there.

Dubsky was also an accomplished visual artist and her paintings of Manila during the Japanese occupation were published in Life magazine. Her husband later published a book of her watercolor paintings, Manila 1944-1945 As Trudl Saw It (1994), about those wartime experiences. They left the Philippines in 1946, but her husband returned several summers to conduct the Manila Symphony Orchestra; in 1967 both Zippers were honored for their contributions to the arts in Manila.

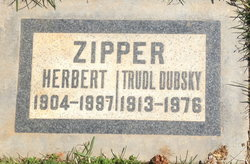
Trudl Dubsky and Herbert Zipper memorial plaque, Woodlawn Memorial Cemetery, Santa Monica, Los Angeles

Dubsky continued as a teacher and choreographer throughout her life, including at her studio in Brooklyn, at Erwin Piscator's theatre workshop in New York, at the Chicago Conservatory of Music, with the North Shore Dance Group, and later at the University of California, Los Angeles.

== Personal life and legacy ==
Dubsky married the Viennese pianist and composer Herbert Zipper, in the Philippines in 1939. She died from lung cancer in Los Angeles in 1976, aged 63 years. The Dance Institute at the Colburn School was renamed the Trudl Zipper Dance Institute in 2008, after a large anonymous donation in her memory. The Herbert Zipper Archives at Crossroads School in Santa Monica, California contain the couple's papers.
