= Hilda Judd =

British biochemist (1882 – 1951)

Hilda Mary Judd
- Born: 1882
- Died: 1951 (aged 68–69)
- Education: Royal College of Science
- Known for: Research into cold storage of fruits
- Awards: Frank Hatton Prize
- Scientific career
- Fields: Biochemistry
- Workplaces: Imperial College London; Goldsmith's College; Department of Scientific and Industrial Research

Hilda Mary Judd (1882–1951) was an English biochemist who contributed to research into painkillers and food storage during World War I.

== Family and education ==
Hilda was one of two children of geologist John Wesley Judd, Dean of the Royal College of Science, and his wife Jeannie, daughter of manufacturing chemist John Jeyes. Educated at a private school in Hastings, she studied at the Royal College of Science from 1901 to 1904, winning the Frank Hatton Prize there in her final year.

== Early career ==
Judd carried out research work at Imperial College London, representing the college at the British Association for the Advancement of Science meeting in South Africa in 1905. She lectured in science at Goldsmith's College from 1906 to 1915. Back at Imperial College from 1916, Judd researched silk, working and co-publishing with chemists Martin Onslow Forster and John B. Farmer.

== Wartime research ==
During World War I, Judd was one of a team of women selected by Martha Whiteley to prepare 'certain substances for the Naval hospitals,' that is, painkillers. The team consisted of Dorothy Haynes, Winifred Hurst, Hilda Judd, Frances Micklethwait, and Sibyl Widdows working as voluntary researchers, with Ethel Thomas and Louise Woll employed by them. Judd and her colleague Dorothy Haynes went on to investigate the chemical changes involved in the cold storage of fruits for the Department of Scientific and Industrial Research.

== Later life ==
The Royal Institute of Chemistry provided her with an allowance as she cared for her mother and brother later in life.

She died in 1951.
