= John Wesley Judd =

British geologist (1840–1916)

John Wesley Judd CB, FRS
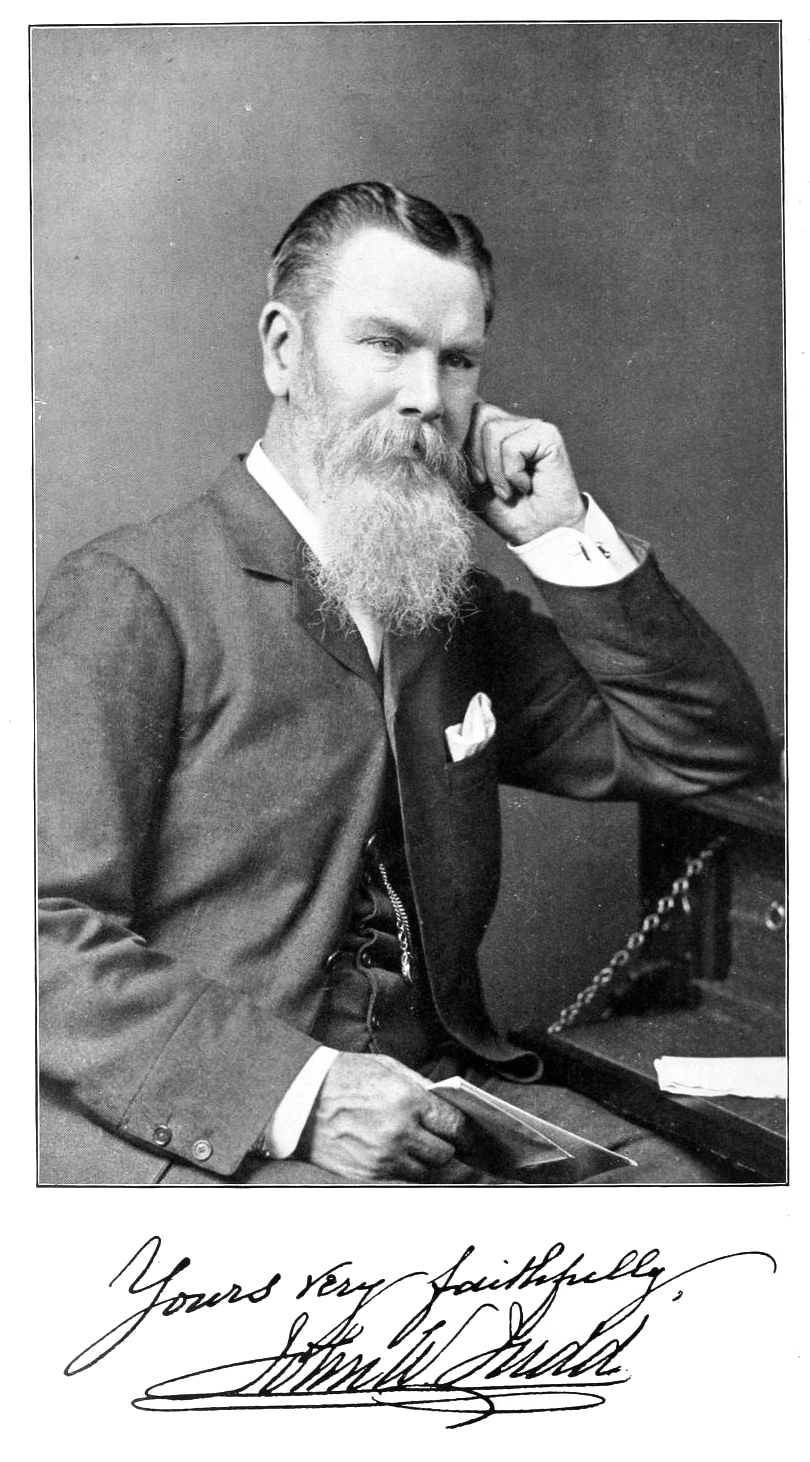
- Born: 18 February 1840; Portsmouth, England
- Died: 3 March 1916 (aged 76)
- Education: Royal School of Mines
- Spouse: Jeannie Frances Jeyes (m. 1878)
- Children: 2, including Hilda Judd (daughter)
- Awards: Wollaston Medal (1891); Companion of the Order of the Bath (1895)
- Scientific career
- Workplaces: British Geological Survey; Imperial College; Royal College of Science

John Wesley Judd CB FRS FGS (18 February 1840 – 3 March 1916) was a British geologist.

== Biography ==
He was born in Portsmouth, Hampshire, England, the son of George and Jannette Judd. At the age of 8, he moved to London, and went to school in Camberwell. After leaving school, Judd became a school-teacher in Horncastle, Lincolnshire until 1863, when he became a student at the Royal School of Mines. From 1867 - 1870, Judd worked for the Geological Survey of England and Wales, mapping Rutland, before joining the Education Department, under Matthew Arnold, as an Inspector of Schools in 1871. In his spare time, Judd continued his geological studies in Scotland, and later in the volcanic districts of Italy. He returned to Imperial College in 1876, succeeding Sir Andrew Ramsey as Professor of Geology.

He was elected a Fellow of the Royal Society in 1877, having been nominated by Charles Darwin, George Julius Poulett Scrope, Nevil Maskelyne and Edward Hull, among others. He was President of the Geological Society between 1886 and 1888 and awarded their Wollaston Medal in 1891. He was later Dean of the Royal College of Science, and Vice-President of the Royal Society from 1902 to 1904. He retired from Imperial College in 1905.

Notable pupils of his include Edgeworth David, William Fraser Hume and Frederick Chapman.

He married in 1878 Jeannie Frances, daughter of John Jeyes. They had a son and a daughter, Hilda, who became a biochemist.

== Works ==
- Judd, John Wesley (1881). Volcanoes: what they are and what they teach. New York: Appleton.
- Judd, John Wesley (1873). The Secondary Rocks of Scotland. First Paper. London: Geological Society.
- Judd, John Wesley (1874). The Secondary Rocks of Scotland. Second Paper. On the Ancient Volcanoes of the Highlands and the Relations of their Products to the Mesozoic Strata (PDF). London: Geological Society.
- Judd, John Wesley (1878). The Secondary Rocks of Scotland. Third Paper. The Strata of the Western Coast and Islands. London: Geological Society.
