= Mark Bryant (cartoon historian) =

British historian of cartoons

Mark Bryant (born 1953) is a British historian of cartoons. He has been honorary secretary and vice president of the British Cartoonists' Association and honorary secretary of the London Press Club.

== Early life and education ==
Christopher Mark Bryant was born in Woodyates, Dorset, on 18 October 1953, and graduated in philosophy from the University of London. He later acquired a PhD in history from the University of Kent.

== Career ==
Bryant has written a number of books on the history of cartoons and has edited more than thirty short story and cartoon collections.

He has been honorary secretary and vice president of the British Cartoonists' Association and honorary secretary of the London Press Club.

He was a trustee of the Cartoon Museum.

He was awarded a special commendation in the Specialist Reference Book of the Year Award, 1990, for Dictionary of Riddles.

== Selected publications ==
- Bryant, Mark (1984). Riddles, ancient and modern (1st American ed.). New York: P. Bedrick Books. ISBN 0911745491.
- Bryant, Mark (12 December 2023). Dictionary of British Cartoonists and Caricaturists : 1730-1980. Routledge. ISBN 978-1032195063.
- Bryant, Mark (2000). Dictionary of twentieth century British cartoonists and caricaturists. Aldershot, Hants: Ashgate. ISBN 1840142863.
- Bryant, Mark (2001). A true compendium of curious facts, bizarre habits, and fascinating anecdotes about the private lives of the famous and infamous throughout history. London: Cassell. ISBN 0304357588.
- Bryant, Mark (2009). The Napoleonic Wars in cartoons. London: Grub Street. ISBN 978-1906502270.
- Bryant, Mark (2011). The world's greatest war cartoonists and caricaturists, 1792-1945. London: Grub Street. ISBN 978-1908117083.
- Bryant, Mark (2014). World War I in cartoons. London. ISBN 978-1909808096.
- Bryant, Mark (2014). World War II in cartoons. London. ISBN 978-1909808119.
