= Peter Van Herrewege =

- Born: December 1953 (age 72)
- Occupation: Businessman
- Known for: Chairman of Prime Life Limited

Peter Alexander Van Herrewege (born December 1953) is a businessman.

He is chairman of Prime Life Limited which was established more than 30 years ago. The company runs Peaker Park Care Village, built in 2011, an £11 million residential complex for the elderly and disabled, on the edge of Market Harborough. It also runs a residential home in Skegness and 63 other properties. It has 1,700 clients and 1,500 staff. He is planning to build a 35-bedroom care home and social centre in Scunthorpe. In 2022, Van Herrewege received a lifetime achievement award.
