= Winifred Grace Wright =

British chemist

Winifred Grace Wright, née Winifred Grace Hurst (6 June 1891 London – 8 September 1978 Durban) was an English chemist best known for her work on devising protection against gas in warfare during World War I. After relocating to South Africa in 1949 she produced an illustrated pocket guide to the flowers of Natal. Hurst initially produced pharmaceuticals in a team working under Martha Whiteley (1866–1956), who was a prominent chemist at the Imperial College, London, and partly responsible for the development of mustard gas used during World War I.

== Education ==
She was educated at the King Edward VI High School for Girls in Birmingham, and was awarded a B.Sc. (London) from Bedford College. Between 1914 and 1918 she worked at the Imperial College on synthetic drugs for the Navy and received a Diploma of Imperial College or the equivalent of an M.Sc.

== First World War ==
In 1918 she joined the Anti-Gas Department of the Ministry of Munitions under Edward Harrison, who died as a result of his experiments.

== Battersea Polytechnic and marriage ==
For the next 30 years from 1919 to 1949 she worked in the Chemistry Department of Battersea Polytechnic. During that period she married John Wright, a consultant on high-tension power lines, and raised a family of 3 daughters.

== Migration to South Africa and interest in plants ==
In 1949 she emigrated to South Africa where her husband was working for Eskom, the State electricity supplier, on power lines between Colenso and Durban. The erection of pylons resulted in the destruction of numerous plants, and John Wright suggested that Winifred document those, but she soon found that there was very little in the way of reference literature. Consequently, she embarked on a project to describe and illustrate the wild flowers, leading to the publication of a small field guide, 'The Wild Flowers of Southern Africa - Natal - A Rambler's Pocket Guide'. Her frequent visits to the Durban Herbarium to identify plants sparked such an interest that she started research at the University of Natal into the chemistry of local flora, resulting in a Ph.D. in 1954.
