= John Brasbrigg =

English book collector

John Brasbrigg or Bracebrigge (fl. 1428) was an English book collector, who appears as a priest of Syon Abbey in 1428.

He is said to have given a large number of books to the convent, and to have written a treatise entitled Catholicon continens quatuor partes grammaticæ, which, with other manuscripts belonging to Syon monastery, passed to Corpus Christi College, Cambridge. (Note: Old catalogue listing 0. 16, and in Nasmith CXLII.) The name of Brasbrigg is not to be found in James Nasmith's catalogue.

== Notes ==
- "Brasbrigg, John" . Dictionary of National Biography. London: Smith, Elder & Co. 1885–1900.
