= Steven Harris (cartoonist) =

British cartoonist and writer

Steven Harris is a British cartoonist and writer, based in London. His first novel, Eustace, was published in March 2013 by Jonathan Cape and launched at Waterstones Gower Street.

== Career ==
Harris contributed the illustrations for a range of books in the Nightingale Press's Modern Anthropology range of humorous Modern Guides, including Hats (which he also authored), Drink, and Spectacles.

Harris also authored the long-running web comics Paper Cuts and Eustace, both published on H2G2 under the pseudonym spimcoot. During time spent with an artists' collective in Angoulême, France, he also contributed satirical French cartoons to a daily Charente newspaper, again under the name spimcoot.

His novel length version of the Eustace comics, 'Eustace', was published in hardback by Jonathan Cape in March 2013. It concerns the adventures of a bed-bound boy, joined by a "swelling cast of hoodlums, models, drunkards and politicians". He is currently writing the second book in the Eustace quartet.
