= Jeanette Rutherston =

British dancer and television critic

- Born: 1902 (age 123–124); Bradford, Yorkshire
- Other names: Jeanette Powell (after marriage)
- Occupations: Dancer, writer, editor television critic
- Relatives: William Rothenstein (uncle) Albert Rutherston (uncle); Michael Rothenstein (cousin) John Rothenstein (cousin)

Jeanette Rutherston (1902–1988), later Jeanette Powell, was a British dancer and television critic. She was a writer and assistant editor on the Dancing Times magazine in the 1930s.

== Early life ==
Jeanette Bertha Rothenstein was born on 10 March 1902 in Bradford, Yorkshire, the daughter of textile manufacturer, art collector and philanthropist Charles Lambert Rothenstein, who changed his German surname in 1916 to make clear his allegiance to the British during World War I. The Rothensteins were Jewish. Her uncles were artist William Rothenstein and stage designer Albert Rutherston. Artist Michael Rothenstein and art historian John Rothenstein were her first cousins.

Jeanette Rothenstein studied ballet as a girl, and after completing studies at Bedford Physical Training College, she pursued further dance training in Vienna, with Gertrud Bodenwieser.

== Career ==
Rutherston toured with the Margaret Morris Dancers as a young woman, and danced on the London stage with fellow Bodenwieser student Trudl Dubsky. Dubsky and Rutherston opened a dance school together in London's Great Ormond Street in 1932; Bodenwieser taught at the school as a guest instructor in 1934. The school closed when Dubsky had health issues, married, and moved away from England.

Rutherston was writer and assistant to editor Philip J. S. Richardson, at the Dancing Times magazine, by 1934. She was a very early television critic, assigned to review ballet broadcasts for the magazine's "Television Notes" column in the 1930s. Because she did not initially have a television set at home, she went to use a set at the Alexandra Palace, and was later allowed to watch at Broadcasting House. She suggested that ballets be made especially for the television format, so different from a theatre setting; but she also noted when well-planned camera work, costumes, and set design improved the viewer's experience of the performance.

== Personal life ==
Jeanette Rutherston married Christopher Cecil Powell. She died on 1 August 1988.
