= Liberty Barros =

British contortionist

- Born: 1 December 2007 (age 18); Leicester, England
- Occupations: TV personality; YouTuber; Flexible dancer/yoga dancer
- Known for: Being the "One Of The Most Flexible Girl"
- Father: Raam Barros
- Relatives: Alyssa Barros (sister)
- YouTube information
- Channel Liberty Barros
- Subscribers 6.69 million
- Views 5.5 billion
- Website: https://libertybarros.com

Liberty Barros (born 1 December 2007) is an English flexible dancer, yoga dancer and media personality. She is considered as one of the most flexible girl in the world. She has Seven Guinness World Records to her name, including one for the highest number of backbends. A flexible move called "Liberty Low Down" has been named after her. She was featured on the front cover of the Guinness World Records 2024 book and in Ripley's Believe It or Not 2025 book.

== Early life ==
Liberty Barros, born 2007 to parents Raam and Elisette, is originally from Leicester and later lived in Slough and Peterborough. Her younger brother Mathis Leo Barros is a member of Peterborough's Spiral Gymnastics Club and achieved his own World Record for male splits in 2024.

== Career ==
At the age of 10, Liberty Barros discovered her extreme flexibility whilst attempting to replicate a dance move from Rihanna in her music video Umbrella. Later, she has become worldwide famous for her extreme flexibility, and has appeared on Britain's Got Talent, Got Talent España, America's Got Talent and Supertalent, earning her a Golden Buzzer, as well as featuring in Welcome to Successful Living is Diesel’s SS24 campaign, and running a popular YouTube channel, which has earned her more than 6.69 million subscribers as of October 2026. In 2025, Liberty Barros modeled for David Wej Lagos at Africa Fashion Week London (AFWL), walking the runway in the designer’s latest collection.
