= A. R. Bridbury =

British historian (1924–2015)

Anthony Randolph Bridbury
- Born: 3 October 1924; London, England
- Died: 17 March 2015 (aged 90); Buckinghamshire, England

Academic background
- Education: London School of Economics; Christ Church, Oxford

Academic work
- Discipline: History
- Sub-discipline: Medieval economies

Anthony Randolph Bridbury (3 October 1924 – 17 March 2015) was a British historian specialising in medieval economics. He wrote Economic Growth: England in the Later Middle Ages (1962), and a collection of his other writings was published in 1992.

== Life and career ==
Bridbury was born in London in October 1924, and educated at Westminster School. He was later a student at the London School of Economics (LSE) and Christ Church, Oxford. He completed his PhD thesis on late medieval English salt imports at the LSE in 1952. He joined the staff in 1954 and was associated with the school and its economic history department until his retirement in 1989.

Bridbury published Economic Growth: England in the Later Middle Ages in 1962. He was also the author of a series of articles on English economic history, ranging in focus from the Anglo-Saxon period to the 16th century, focusing on the history and evolution of the English manor. Most of these articles appeared in the Economic History Review between 1969 and 1986 and became well known. His collected studies were republished in book form by Boydell and Brewer in 1992. In addition to his work on medieval history, Bridbury published Historians and the Open Society in 1972. This book talks about historians’ political views conflicting with the judgements they make about events.

Bridbury died in Buckinghamshire on 17 March 2015, at the age of 90.

== Reputation ==
Bridbury was a prominent English medievalist in the post-war period, writing on the pre-Norman period, Domesday Book, and 14th and 15th century England. He is best known for his interpretation of the English economy in the late 14th and 15th centuries in terms of fundamental buoyancy and resilience, although later in his career he moderated some of these claims.

Bridbury was described by the historian Mark Bailey as an "original, questioning, and provocative mind", typically hostile to systematic or ideological theories of the medieval period, whose strength was "to tweak the nose of anything resembling an orthodoxy". Another medievalist, Richard Britnell, has remarked that Bridbury has the ability to "hit core problems, and in doing so helped to define them". Criticism of Bridbury's work have focused around his use of primary research material and the suggestion that he has been excessively optimistic in his interpretation of the quality of daily life during the medieval period.

== Selected works ==
- A.R. Bridbury, (1955) England and the Salt Trade in the Later Middle Ages, Oxford: Clarendon Press.
- A.R. Bridbury, (1962) Economic Growth: England in the Later Middle Ages, London: George Allen and Unwin.
- A.R. Bridbury, (1969) "The Dark Ages", Economic History Review, 2nd series, 22(3), pp. 526–537.
- A.R. Bridbury, (1972) Historians and the Open Society. London: Routledge & Kegan Paul
- A.R. Bridbury, (1973) "The Agrarian History of England and Wales, A.D 43-1042, Vol. II Cambridge, 1972. Postan, M.M. The Medieval Economy and Society. London 1972 (Review article)", Economic History Review, 2nd series, 26(3), pp. 518–524.
- A.R. Bridbury, (1973) "The Black Death", Economic History Review, 2nd series, 26(4), pp. 577–592
- A.R. Bridbury, (1974) "Sixteenth Century Farming", The Economic History Review, 2nd series, 27(4), pp. 538–556,
- A.R. Bridbury, (1976) "The Hundred Years' War: Costs and Profits", in D. C. Coleman, and A. H. John (eds.) Trade, Government and Economy in Pre-industrial England: Essays Presented to F. J. Fisher, London: Weidenfeld and Nicolson, pp. 80–95.
- A.R. Bridbury, (1977) "Before the Black Death", Economic History Review, 2nd series, 30(3), pp. 393–410.
- A.R. Bridbury, (1978) "The Farming Out of Manors", Economic History Review, 2nd series, 31(4), pp. 503–520.
- A.R. Bridbury, (1981) "English Provincial Towns in the Later Middle Ages", Economic History Review, 2nd series, 34(1), pp. 1–24.
- A.R. Bridbury (1982) Medieval English Clothmaking: An Economic Survey, London: Ashgate.
- A.R. Bridbury (1984) "Late Medieval Urban Prosperity: A Rejoinder", Economic History Review, 2nd series, 37(4), pp. 555–556.
- A.R. Bridbury, (1985) "Thirteenth-Century Prices and the Money Supply", Agricultural History Review, 33(1), pp. 1–21.
- A.R. Bridbury (1986) "Dr. Rigby's Comment: A Reply", Economic History Review, 2nd series, 39(3), pp. 417–422
- A.R. Bridbury (1986) "Markets and Freedom in the Middle Ages", in B. L. Anderson and A. J. H. Latham (eds), The Market In History: Papers Presented at a Symposium Held 9–13 September 1984 at St George's House, Windsor Castle, London, Croom Helm, pp. 79–121.
- A.R. Bridbury, (1990) "Domesday Book: A Re-interpretation", English Historical Review, 105(415), pp. 284–309.
- A.R. Bridbury, (1992) The English Economy from Bede to the Reformation, Woodbridge, Suffolk: Boydell & Brewer.
- A.R. Bridbury, (1998) "Black Death", in Paul E. Szarmach (ed),Medieval England. An Encyclopedia, New York: Garland, pp. 130–132.
- A.R. Bridbury, (2008) Medieval England: A Survey of Social and Economic Origins and Development, Leicester: Matador.
