= Albert Rutherston =

English painter

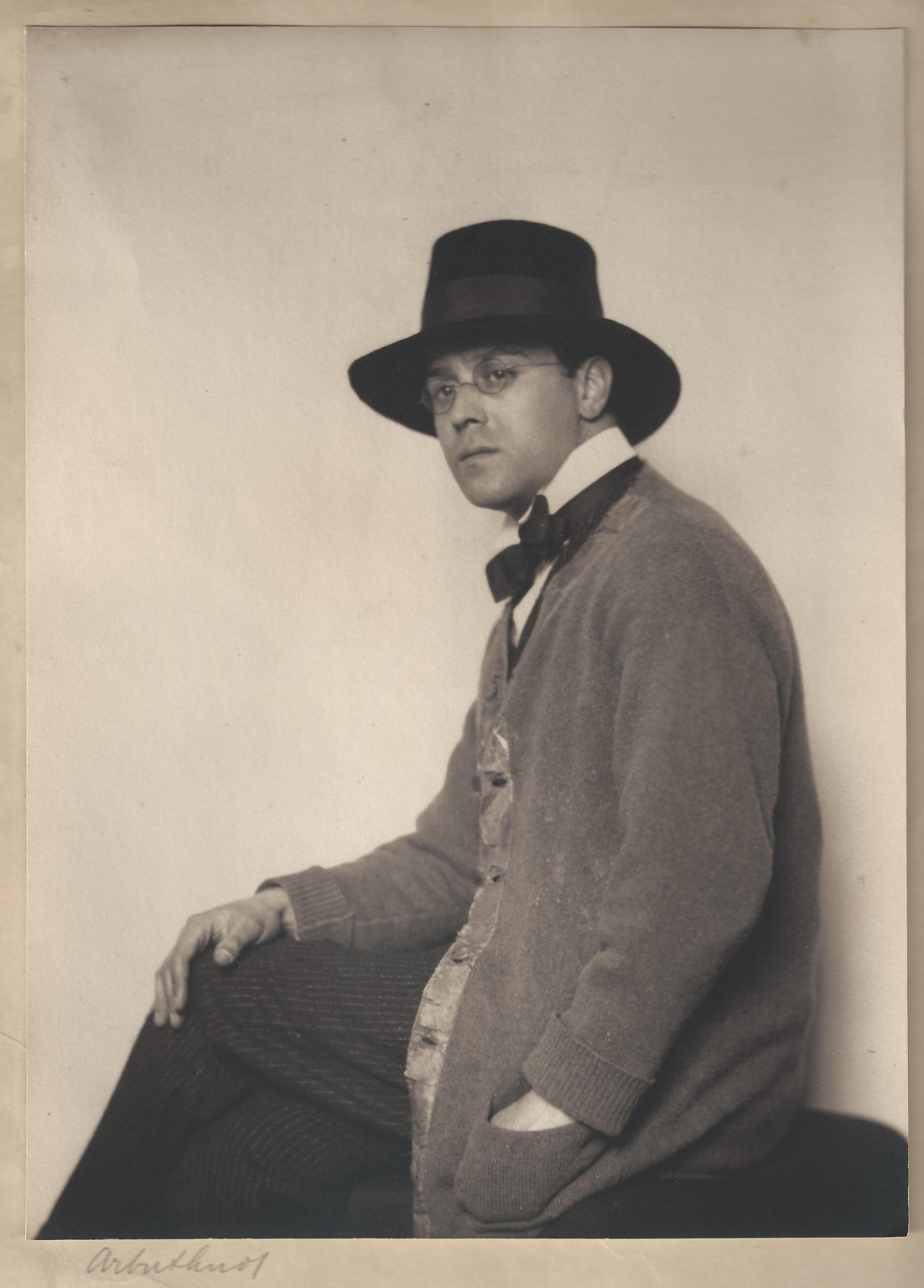
Albert Rutherston, c.1911

Albert Daniel Rutherston (5 December 1881 – 14 July 1953) was a British artist. He painted figures and landscape, illustrated books and designed posters and stage sets.

== Personal life and education ==
Albert Daniel Rothenstein born 5 December 1881 in Bradford, Yorkshire of German Jewish descent. His mother Bertha and father Moritz Rothenstein, who worked in the wool cloth business, immigrated in the 1860s to England and settled in Bradford, Yorkshire. He was the youngest of six children. Two of his brothers were the painter Sir William Rothenstein and Charles Rutherston, who collected art. His sister Emily Hesslein was also an art collector.

He anglicised his surname to Rutherston in 1916 during the First World War as a sign of patriotism for England.

Rutherston was a pupil at Bradford Grammar School and from 1898 to 1902 he attended Slade School of Art.

He died at Ouchy-Lausanne, Switzerland on 14 July 1953.

== Career ==
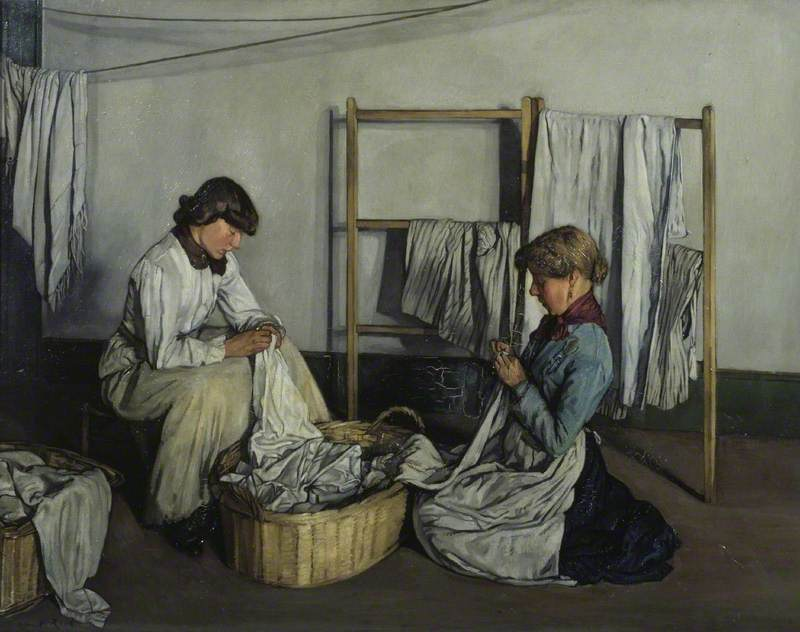
Albert Rutherston: Laundry Girls 1906. Tate

Rutherston started as a realist painter but changed to a more decorative style around 1910, the year of his first one-man exhibition at the Carfax Gallery.

He served in the Army in Palestine between 1916 and 1919. Rutherston then wrote the book "Decoration in the Art of the Theatre" published in 1919 and edited the Contemporary British Artists series between 1923 and 1927. In 1927 Rutherston illustrated the Thomas Hardy book Yuletide In A Younger World, designed posters and tickets for the London Underground and a range of decorative cover papers for Curwen Press. He held the post of Ruskin Master of Drawing in Oxford from 1929 to 1948. He also designed stage sets for Harley Granville-Barker's productions.

== Select Bibliography ==
- Colvile, Kathleen, Mr. Marionette - with drawings by Albert Rutherston (London: Chatto and Windus, 1925)
- Rogerson, Ian, Pen, paper and a box of paints. Albert Rutherston, illustrator and designer for the stage(Upper Denby: The Fleece Press, 2015)
